= Family tree of Byzantine emperors =

This is a family tree of all the Eastern Roman Emperors who ruled in Constantinople. Most of the Eastern emperors were related in some form to their predecessors, sometimes by direct descent or by marriage. From the Doukid dynasty (1059) onwards all emperors are related to the same family.

Dynasty names are given in capitals so that they can be picked out from the interweaving trees. Junior co-emperors who never exercised real power are shown in a smaller font to distinguish them from the reigning emperor.

== 286–518 ==
This is a simplified family tree centered solely around the Eastern Empire, for a fuller list that includes both Eastern and Western emperors, see Family tree of Roman emperors

Diocletian eastern r. 286–305
Afrianius; Hannibalianus (?)	Maximian western r. 286–305	Eutropia	Galeria Valeria	Galerius eastern r. 305–311
Maximiana; Theodora	Constantius I western r. 305–306	St. Helena	Maxentius western 306–312	Valeria Maximilla
CONSTANTINIAN
Julius; Constantius d. 337	Constantia m. Licinius rival r. 308–324	Constantine I 272–337 r. 306–337	Fausta; 289–326
VALENTINIANIC
Julian; 331–363 r. 361–363	Helena d. 360	Constantine II; 316–340 r. 337–340, West	Constantius II; 317–361 r. 337–361	Constans I 320–350 r. 337–350, West	Valentinian I 321–375 r. 364–375, West	Valens; 328–378 r. 364–378
THEODOSIAN
Jovian; 331–364 r. 363–364	Procopius (cousin) rival r. 365–366	Constantia; 361–383	Gratian; 359–383 r. 378–379	Valentinian II; 371–392 r. 375–392, West	Galla d. 394	Theodosius I 347–395 r. 379–395	Aelia Flaccilla; 356–386
Arcadius; 377–408 r. 395–408
Theodosius II; 401–450 r. 408–450	Pulcheria; 399–453	Marcian; 392–457 r. 450–457
LEONID
Basiliscus r. 475–476	Verina d. 484	Leo I 401–474 r. 457–474	Marcia; Euphemia
Marcus r. 475–476	Anastasius I 430–518 r. 491–518	Ariadne; 450–515	Zeno; 425–491 r. 474–475, 476–491	Leontia	Marcianus usurper in 479
Leo II; 467–474 r. 474

== 518–602 ==
JUSTINIAN
Sabbatius	Vigilantia	Justin I 450–527 r. 518–527	Lupicinia; Euphemia
Vigilantia	(adopted); Justinian I 482–565 r. 527–565	Theodora I adviser 527–548
Justin II; 520–578 r. 565–578
(adopted); Tiberius II; 535–582 r. 574–582	Paul
Constantina; 560–605	Maurice; 539–602 r. 582–602
Theodosius; 583–602 r. 590–602

== 610–711 ==
HERACLIAN
Heraclius the Elder d. 610
Eudokia	Heraclius; 575–641 r. 610–641	Martina regent 641
Constantine III; 612–641 r. 641	Heraclonas; 626–641 r. 641	David Tiberius b. 630 r. 641
Constans II; 630–668 r. 641–668
Heraclius r. 659–681	Tiberius r. 659–681	Constantine IV; 652–685 r. 668–685
Leontius r. 695–698	Twenty Years'; Anarchy (695–717)	Tiberius III r. 698–705	Justinian II; 669–711 r. 685–695, 705–711
Philippicus r. 711–713	Anastasius II r. 713–715	Theodosius III r. 715–717	Tiberius; 705–711 r. 706–711

== 717–1453 ==
ISAURIAN
Leo III; 685–741 r. 717–741
NIKEPHORIAN
Constantine V 718–775 r. 741–775	Anna	Artabasdos r. 741–743	Nikephoros I r. 802–811
Nicephorus r. 741–743	Prokopia; 770–813	Michael I c. 770–844 r. 811–813
Leo IV; 750–780 r. 775–780	Irene; 752–803 r. 797–802	Theophano (relative)	Staurakios c. 790–812 r. 811	Theophylact c. 793–849 r. 811–813	Staurakios II c. 795–813 r. 811–813
Constantine VI; 771–797 r. 780–797	Bardanes Tourkos	Leo V 775–820 r. 813–820
AMORIAN
Euphrosyne; 790–839	Michael II; 770–829 r. 820–829	Thekla d. 823	Constantine r. 813–820
Theodora II; 815–867 regent 842–856	Theophilos; 813–842 r. 829–842	Inger; Martinakios
MACEDONIAN
Thekla co-regent 842–856	Constantine c.834–835 r. 835	Michael III; 840–867 r. 842–867	Eudokia Ingerina; 840–882	Basil I 811–886 r. 867–886
LEKAPENOS
Leo VI; 866–912 r. 886–912	Alexander; 870–913 r. 912–913	Constantine r. 868–879	Romanos I 870–948 r. 920–944
PHOKAS
Bardas; 878–968	Stephen d. 963 r. 924–945	Constantine r. 924–945	Christopher r. 921–931
ARGYROS
Constantine VII; 905–959 r. 913–959	Helena; 910–961	Agatha	Romanos Argyros
Nikephoros II; 912–969 r. 963–969	Theophano; 941–976	Romanos II; 938–963 r. 959–963	Theodora b. 946	John I 925–976 r. 969–976	son name unknown
Basil II; 958–1025 r. 976–1025	Constantine VIII; 960–1028 r. 1025–1028	Eustathios / Pothos Argyros
Theodora III; 984–1056 r. 1055–1056	Stephen	Maria	Michael IV; 1010–1041 r. 1034–1041	Zoe; 978–1050 r. 1042	Romanos III; 968–1034 r. 1028–1034	Basil Argyros b. 970
Michael V 1015–1042 r. 1041–1042	Michael VI r. 1056–1057	Constantine IX; MONOMACHOS; 1000–1055 r. 1042–1055	Constantine; DIOGENES	wife name unknown
DOUKAS
Andronikos Doukas
KOMNENOS
Manuel Erotikos; Komnenos	John Doukas caesar	Constantine X 1009–1067 r. 1059–1067	Eudokia; Makrembolitissa; 1021–1096, regent 1067	Romanos IV d. 1072 r. 1068–1071
Isaac I 1005–1061 r. 1057–1059	John Komnenos	Andronikos Doukas d. 1077	Konstantios r. 1060–1071	Andronikos r. 1068–1071	Nikephoros r. 1071–1071	Leo r. 1070–1071
BOTANEIATES
Alexios I 1048–1118 r. 1081–1118	Irene Doukaina	Michael VII; 1050–1090 r. 1071–1078	Maria of Alania; 1050–1103	Nikephoros III ?–1081 r. 1078–1081
ANGELOS
Constantine Angelos; 1085–1166	Theodora Komnene; 1096–?	John II; 1087–1143 r. 1118–1143	Anna Komnene; 1083–1153	Isaac; Komnenos; 1093–1152
John Doukas; RULERS OF EPIRUS	Andronikos Angelos Doukas; 1122–1185	Isaac Angelos Doukas; 1137–?	Manuel I 1118–1180 r. 1143–1180	Alexios; 1106–1142 r. 1122–1142	Andronikos I 1118–1185 r. 1183–1185
Isaac II; 1156–1204 r. 1185–95, r. 1203–4	Alexios III; 1153–1211 r. 1195–1203	Alexios II; 1169–1183 r. 1180–1183	John; 1159–1185 r. 1183–1185	Manuel Komnenos; RULERS OF TREBIZOND
LASKARIS
Alexios IV; 1182–1204 r. 1203–1204	Alexios V d. 1204 r. 1204	Eudokia Angelina	... Angelina Doukaina	Basil; VATATZES	Anna Komnene Angelina; 1176–1212	Theodore I 1175–1222 r. 1204–1222
Alexios Palaiologos despot	Irene; Angelina	Isaac Doukas Vatatzes d. 1261	John III; 1192–1254 r. 1222–1254	Irene Laskarina	Nicholas r. 1208–1210
PALAIOLOGOS
Andronikos; Komnenos Palaiologos	Theodora Angelina Palaiologina	John Doukas Vatatzes b. 1215	Theodore II; 1222–1258 r. 1254–1258
Michael VIII; 1223–1282 r. 1261–1282	Theodora; Vatatzena; 1240–1303	John IV; 1250–1305 r. 1258–1261
Ivan Asen III of Bulgaria; 1259–1303	Irene; Palaiologina	Andronikos II; 1259–1332 r. 1272–1328
Andronikos Asen d. 1322	Michael IX; 1277–1320 r. 1294–1320
KANTAKOUZENOS
John VI; 1292–1383 r. 1347–1354	Irene Asanina	Andronikos III; 1297–1341 r. 1316–1341
Matthew; 1325–1383 r. 1353–1357	Helena; 1333–1396	John V 1332–1391 r. 1341–1391*
Andronikos IV; 1348–1385 r. 1376–1379	Manuel II; 1350–1425 r. 1391–1425
John VII; 1370–1408 r. 1390
Andronikos V 1400–1407 r. 1403–1407	John VIII; 1392–1448 r. 1416–1448	Constantine XI; 1405–1453 r. 1449–1453	Thomas despot of Morea
Helena m. Lazar Branković	Andreas titular	Sophia m. Ivan III of Russia

== See also ==
- Family tree of Roman emperors
- List of Roman emperors
- List of Byzantine emperors
- History of the Byzantine Empire
- Byzantine Empire under the Constantinian and Valentinianic dynasties
- Byzantine Empire under the Theodosian dynasty
- Byzantine Empire under the Leonid dynasty
- Byzantine Empire under the Justinian dynasty
- Byzantine Empire under the Heraclian dynasty
- Twenty Years' Anarchy
- Byzantine Empire under the Isaurian dynasty
- Byzantine Empire under the Amorian dynasty
- Byzantine Empire under the Macedonian dynasty
- Byzantine Empire under the Doukas dynasty
- Byzantine Empire under the Komnenos dynasty
- Byzantine Empire under the Angelos dynasty
- Laskarid dynasty (Empire of Nicaea)
- Grand Komnenos (Empire of Trebizond)
- Komnenos Doukas (Empire of Thessalonica)
- Byzantine Empire under the Palaiologos dynasty
- List of Byzantine families
