= List of Roman dynasties =

This is a list of the dynasties that ruled the Roman Empire and its two succeeding counterparts, the Western Roman Empire and the Eastern Roman Empire. Dynasties of states that had claimed legal succession from the Roman Empire are not included in this list.

== List of Roman dynasties ==
Dynasty	Period of rule			Rulers (Note: As adoption was widely practiced by the upper classes, some Roman monarchs were not directly biologically related to their predecessors despite belonging to the same dynasty. For example, the second emperor of the Julio–Claudian dynasty, Tiberius, was in fact an adopted son of the dynastic founder, Augustus.)		
Dynasty	Start	End	Term	First to rule	Last to rule	List / Family tree
Dynasties of the Principate
Julio–Claudian dynasty	27 BCE	68 CE	95 years	Augustus	Nero	(list) (tree)
Flavian dynasty	69 CE	96 CE	27 years	Vespasian	Domitian	(list) (tree)
Nerva–Antonine dynasty (Note: The Nerva–Antonine dynasty is sometimes subdivided into the Nerva–Trajan dynasty and the Antonine dynasty.)	96 CE	192 CE	96 years	Nerva	Commodus	(list) (tree)
Severan dynasty	193 CE	235 CE	41 years (Note: The rule of the Severan dynasty was interrupted between 217 CE and 218 CE. Caracalla was the last ruler before the interregnum. Elagabalus was the first ruler after the interregnum.)	Septimius Severus	Severus Alexander	(list) (tree)
Gordian dynasty	238 CE	244 CE	6 years	Gordian I	Gordian III	(list) (tree)
Dynasties of the Dominate
Constantinian dynasty (Note: The Constantinian dynasty is also known as the "Neo-Flavian dynasty".)	305 CE	363 CE	58 years	Constantius Chlorus (Western) Constantine I (Eastern)	Julian (Western & Eastern)	(list) (tree)
Valentinianic dynasty	364 CE	392 CE (Note: Constantius III (through marriage) and Valentinian III (through matrilineal descent) are sometimes considered part of both the Valentinianic and Theodosian dynasties. If included in the Valentinianic dynasty, that dynasty also ruled in 421, and in 425–455. This would bring the dynasty's end date to 455 and its total "term" to 59 years.)	28 years	Valentinian I (Western & Eastern)	Valens (Eastern) Valentinian II (Western)	(list) (tree)
Theodosian dynasty	379 CE	457 CE	78 years	Theodosius I (Western & Eastern)	Valentinian III (Western) Marcian (Eastern)	(list W) / (list E) (tree)
Eastern (Byzantine) dynasties
Leonid dynasty	457 CE	518 CE	61 years	Leo I	Anastasius I	(list) (tree)
Justinian dynasty	518 CE	602 CE	84 years	Justin I	Maurice and Theodosius (Note: Maurice and Theodosius reigned as co-rulers.)	(list) (tree)
Heraclian dynasty	610 CE	711 CE	91 years (Note: The rule of the Heraclian dynasty was interrupted between 695 CE and 705 CE. Justinian II was both the last ruler before the interregnum and the first ruler after the interregnum.)	Heraclius	Justinian II and Tiberius (Note: Justinian II and Tiberius reigned as co-rulers.)	(list) (tree)
Isaurian dynasty (Note: The Isaurian dynasty is also known as the "Syrian dynasty".)	717 CE	802 CE	85 years	Leo III	Irene of Athens	(list) (tree)
Nikephorian dynasty	802 CE	813 CE	11 years	Nikephoros I	Michael I Rangabe and Theophylact (Note: Michael I Rangabe and Theophylact reigned as co-rulers.)	(list) (tree)
Amorian dynasty (Note: The Amorian dynasty is also known as the "Phrygian dynasty".)	820 CE	867 CE	47 years	Michael II	Michael III	(list) (tree)
Macedonian dynasty	867 CE	1056 CE	189 years	Basil I	Theodora Porphyrogenita	(list) (tree)
Komnenid dynasty (Note: The Komnenid dynasty also ruled the Empire of Trebizond between 1204 and 1461.)	1057 CE	1185 CE	106 years (Note: The rule of the Komnenid dynasty was interrupted between 1059 CE and 1081 CE. Isaac I Komnenos was the last ruler before the interregnum. Alexios I Komnenos was the first ruler after the interregnum.)	Isaac I Komnenos	Andronikos I Komnenos and John Komnenos (Note: Andronikos I Komnenos and John Komnenos reigned as co-rulers.)	(list) (tree)
Doukid dynasty	1059 CE	1078 CE	19 years	Constantine X Doukas	Michael VII Doukas	(list) (tree)
Angelid dynasty	1185 CE	1204 CE	19 years	Isaac II Angelos	Alexios IV Angelos	(list) (tree)
Laskarid dynasty (Note: In the aftermath of the Fourth Crusade, the Laskarid dynasty of the Empire of Nicaea is traditionally accepted by historians as the legitimate continuation of the Roman Empire, mostly because in 1261 it recovered Constantinople, New Rome. During the period between 1204–1261, however, there were four competing dynasties—aside from the Laskarids in Nicaea, these were the Latin emperors of the "Flanders dynasty" in Constantinople, the Komnenodoukai of Epirus and the Megalokomnenoi of Trebizond—equally claiming the Byzantine emperorship.)	1204 CE	1261 CE	57 years	Theodore I Laskaris	John IV Laskaris	(list) (tree)
Palaiologan dynasty	1259 CE	1453 CE	194 years	Michael VIII Palaiologos	Constantine XI Palaiologos	(list) (tree)

== See also ==
- Dynasty
- History of the Byzantine Empire
- History of the Roman Empire
- List of Byzantine emperors
- List of Byzantine usurpers
- List of condemned Roman emperors
- List of Roman emperors
- List of Roman usurpers
- Pax Romana
- Succession of the Roman Empire
- List of largest empires
