= Sack of Pliskia =

- Part of the Byzantine–Bulgarian wars
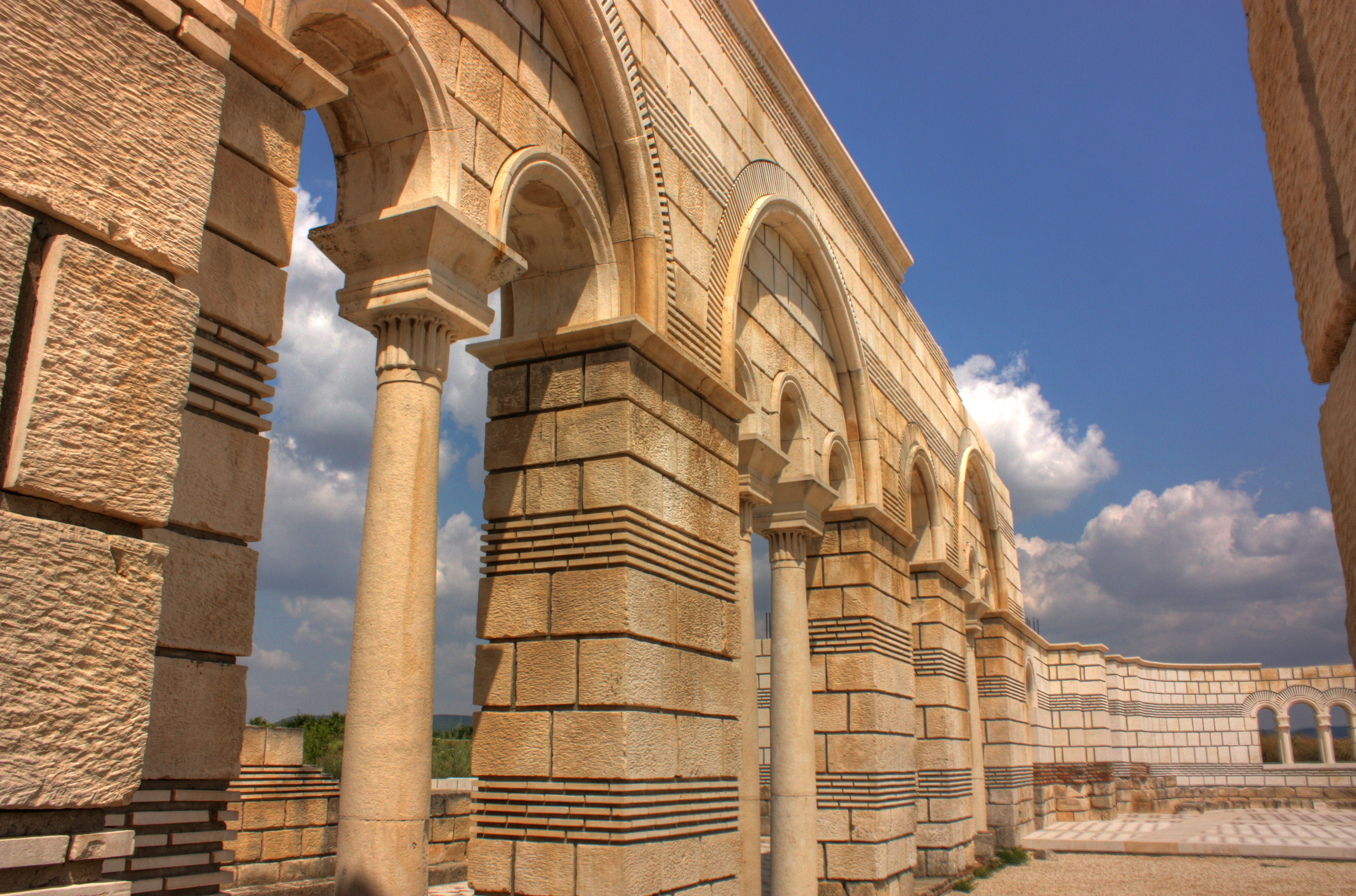
- The Great Basilica Klearchos
Date	July 811
Location	Balkans
Result	Byzantine victory

Belligerents
Byzantine Empire	First Bulgarian Empire

Commanders and leaders
Nikephoros I Staurakios; Theoktistos	Kanasubigi Krum

Strength
60,000 – 80,000 (Note: Most current medieval military historians (such as John Haldon) state that moving 80,000 men through the Haemus Mountains would have caused a logistical collapse from starvation before ever reaching Pliska. Consequently, the modern consensus scales the active field army down to 20,000 to 30,000 combatants.); 20,000 – 30,000 (modern estimates)	15,000 – 50,000

Casualties and losses
Unknown	Very Heavy (Note: The garrison and most of the relief forces were allegedly annihilated)

The Sack of Pliska occurred in July 811, when the Byzantine Emperor Nikephoros I invaded Bulgaria and captured their capital of Pliska, massacring the population and burning the city to the ground, ending the campaign in an initial resounding success for the Byzantine Empire.

== Background ==
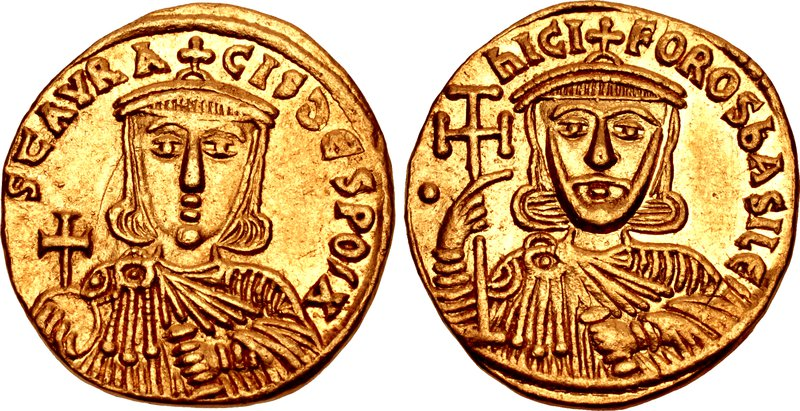
Solidus depicting the busts of Emperor Nikephoros I and his son Staurakios

in 807, Khan Krum defeated a Byzantine army at the Struma valley and captured a large amount of gold, intended as wages for the Byzantine army. In 809, Krum then besieged Serdica and forced its surrender, slaughtering the Byzantine garrison in spite of his promise of safe conduct. The massacre provoked Nikephoros to mobilize a large army in an retaliatory attempt to eliminate the Bulgar threat. The army included forces from the Anatolian and European themes, along with the imperial tagmata. The army was joined by a number of irregular troops, who expected a swift victory and the chance to plunder. Nikephoros was accompanied by his son Staurakios and his brother-in-law Michael.

== Campaign ==
Nikephoros divided the army into three columns, with each marching by a different route towards the Bulgarian capital of Pliska, meeting barely any resistance, After three days of marching, the Byzantine army reached the city, which was defended by a 12,000 elite Bulgar garrison. The Byzantines defeated the defenders, along with an additional Bulgar relief army of 15,000, which had been hastily assembled. According to the chronicle of 811, this Bulgarian relief column was larger, comprising of 50,000 horsemen, however these figures are exaggerated. On 23 July, the Byzantines entered the capital ans sacked the city and its surrounding areas, committing atrocities against its civilian population. A chronicle from the Syriac Patriarch Michael the Syrian states that:

"Nicephorus, emperor of the Romans, walked in the Bulgarians' land: he was victorious and killed a great number of them. He reached their capital, took it over, and devastated it. His savagery went to such a point that he had their small children brought out, tied to the ground, and crushed with millstones. The Byzantine soldiers looted and plundered; burnt down the unharvested fields, cut the tendons of the oxen, slaughtered sheep and pigs."

— Anonymus Vaticanus, p. 150

Krum attempted another peace negotiation sending an emissary proposing:

"Here you are, you have won. So take what you please and go with peace."

Nikephoros, believing the Bulgars were thoroughly defeated, neglected his tactical command duties. He allowed his vast army to scatter across the countryside, leaving them unsupervised. The common soldiers traveled in fragmented, uncoordinated groups to burn fields and slaughter livestock, leaving them completely vulnerable to ambushes. Nikephoros initially intended to march west across Moesia and towards Serdica, in order to completely subjugate the region, but the march was aborted when word reached Nikephoros that Krum was raising a massive new army, which included Avar mercenaries and armed peasant women to hunt him down triggering Nikephoros to lose his composure and judgment after leaving the ruins of Pliska. He began violently lashing out, punishing his own top officers and soldiers for minor or imagined slights after leaving pliskia.

== Aftermath ==
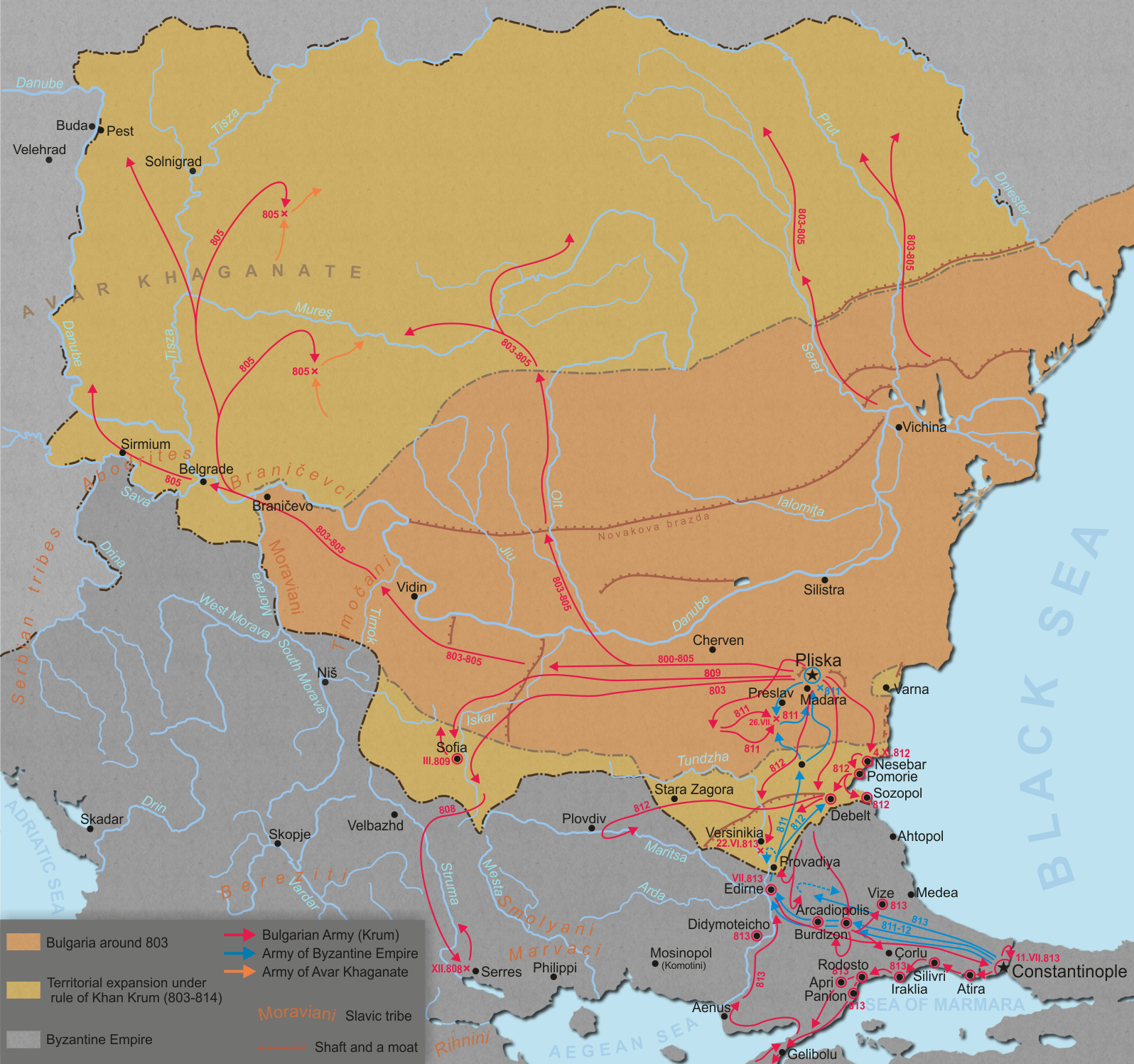
Routes of both armies of Krum and Nikephoros I (803-814)

On 25 July the Byzantine army arrived at the Vărbitsa Pass. The Byzantine cavalry informed the emperor that the road was barred with wooden walls and that Krum's forces watched from the surrounding heights. Nikephoros lost nerve and reportedly stated to his companions repeatedly

"Even if we grew wings, no-one could hope to escape ruin."

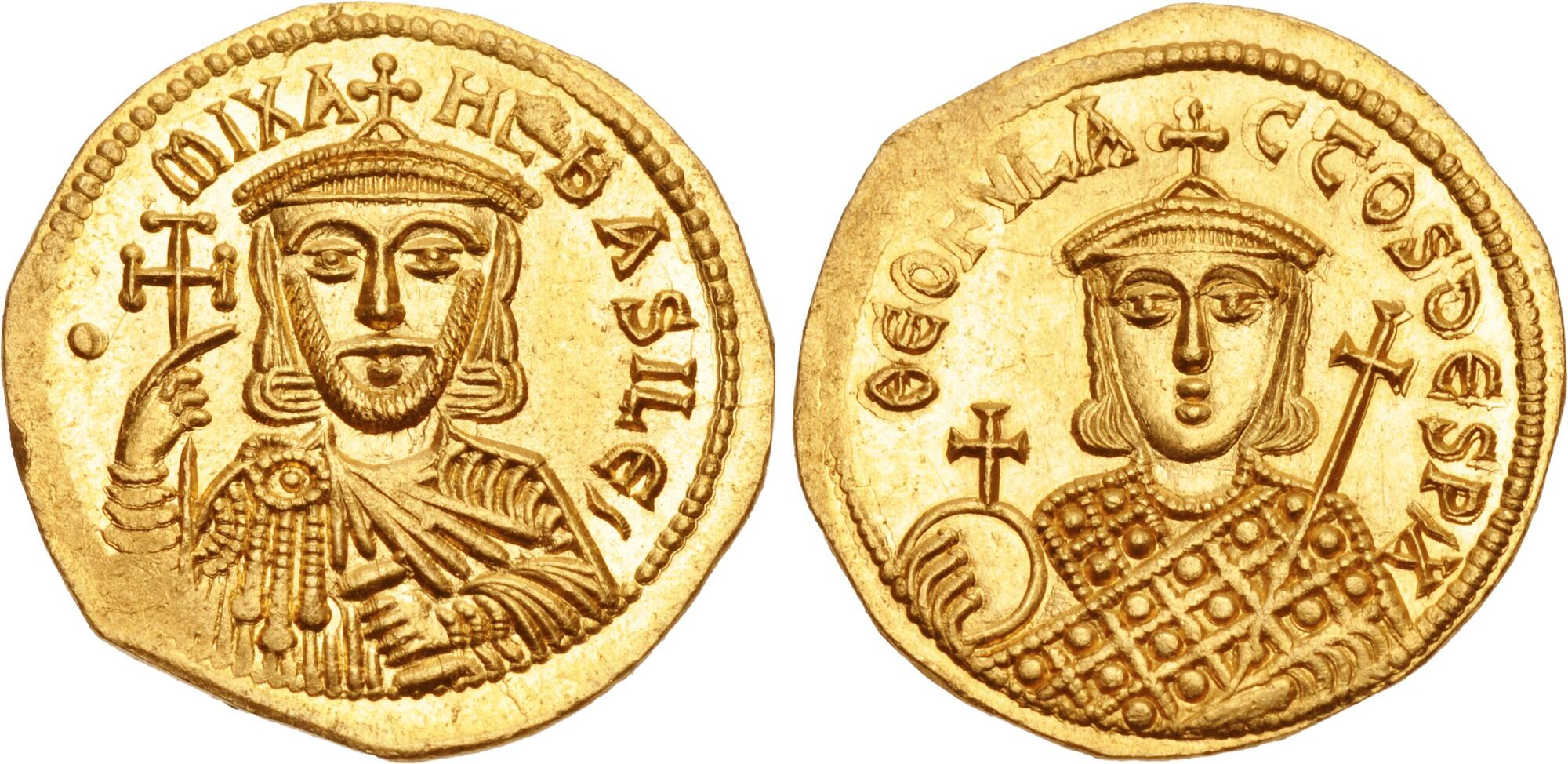
Solidus of Michael I Rhangabe, with his son Theophylactus 811-813.

unwilling to consider an assault on the palisades, simply set up camp for three days shattering the army’s morale despite his generals' misgivings, giving the Bulgarians time to properly surround them and prepare the final assault at dawn, the Bulgarians rushed down the hills and The Byzantine Imperial Bodyguard was the first to be attacked, with fruitless resistance the Byzantine army was ambushed and utterly slaughtered. seeing their comrades' fate, the other units broke and fled towards a muddy river that was so difficult to cross that they were unable to quickly ford the river, resulting in many of the remaining troops and the mounted forces to fall into the water and became stuck in the mud. As additional waves of panicked and fleeing soldiers arrived at the river, they were trampled and killed with many of their compatriots. The river became filled with so many dead that the pursuing Bulgarians easily passed over the dead and continued to hunt down and attack the Byzantines. Those who made it across the river were later confronted by high moated wooden walls constructed by the Bulgarians to impede the pathways to the south. The Byzantines attempted to climb over the wall and many were partially successful only to suffer injuries and death in the process. The Byzantines attempted to burn the walls but this tactic also proved ineffective and resulted in additional casualties. Almost all the fleeing Byzantines perished, some were killed by the sword; others drowned in the river; and many were mortally injured at the walls, Nikephoros was among the slain on a dunghill on the day of the battle, although his son Staurakios survived he was wounded near his neck by a sword which paralyzed his spine, he was safely carried by the Imperial bodyguard to Adrianople, the wound was never properly cleaned or treated and he eventually forced to abdicate after He attempted to secure his legacy by naming his wife, Theophano, as his successor which caused panic in the court. He was forced to abdicate in October 811 and was sent to a monastery. He finally succumbed to the infected, gangrenous wound on January 11, 812 just five months after the battle, he was succeeded by his brother-in-law Michael I Rangabe.

== Bibliography ==
- Sophoulis, Panos (2011). Byzantium and Bulgaria, 775–831. Winner of the 2013 John Bell Book Prize. Oxford University Press. ISBN 978 90 04 20695 3.
- Treadgold, Warren (1988). The Byzantine Revival, 780–842. Stanford, California: Stanford University Press. ISBN 978-0-8047-1462-4.
- Fine, John V. A. Jr. (1991) [1983]. The Early Medieval Balkans: A Critical Survey from the Sixth to the Late Twelfth Century. Ann Arbor: University of Michigan Press. ISBN 0-472-08149-7.
