= Theophylact (son of Michael I) =

Byzantine co-emperor from 811 to 813

- Emperor of the Romans
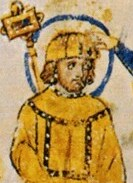
- A young prince, most likely Theophylact, being crowned junior emperor by his father, miniature from the 12th century Madrid Skylitzes.

Byzantine emperor
- Co-reign: 25 December 811 – 11 July 813
- Predecessor: Michael I Rangabe
- Successor: Leo V the Armenian
- Senior emperor: Michael I Rangabe
- Born: c. 793
- Died: 15 January 849 (aged 55–56); Plate Island
- Dynasty: Nikephorian dynasty
- Father: Michael I Rangabe
- Mother: Prokopia

Theophylact or Theophylaktos (Greek: Θεοφύλακτος, romanized: Theophylaktos; c. 793 – 15 January 849) was the eldest son of the Byzantine emperor Michael I Rangabe (r. 811–813) and grandson, on his mother's side, of Nikephoros I (r. 802–811). He was junior co-emperor alongside his father for the duration of the latter's reign, and was tonsured, castrated, and exiled to Plate Island after his overthrow, under the monastic name Eustratius (Εὐστράτιος; Evstrátios).

== Biography ==
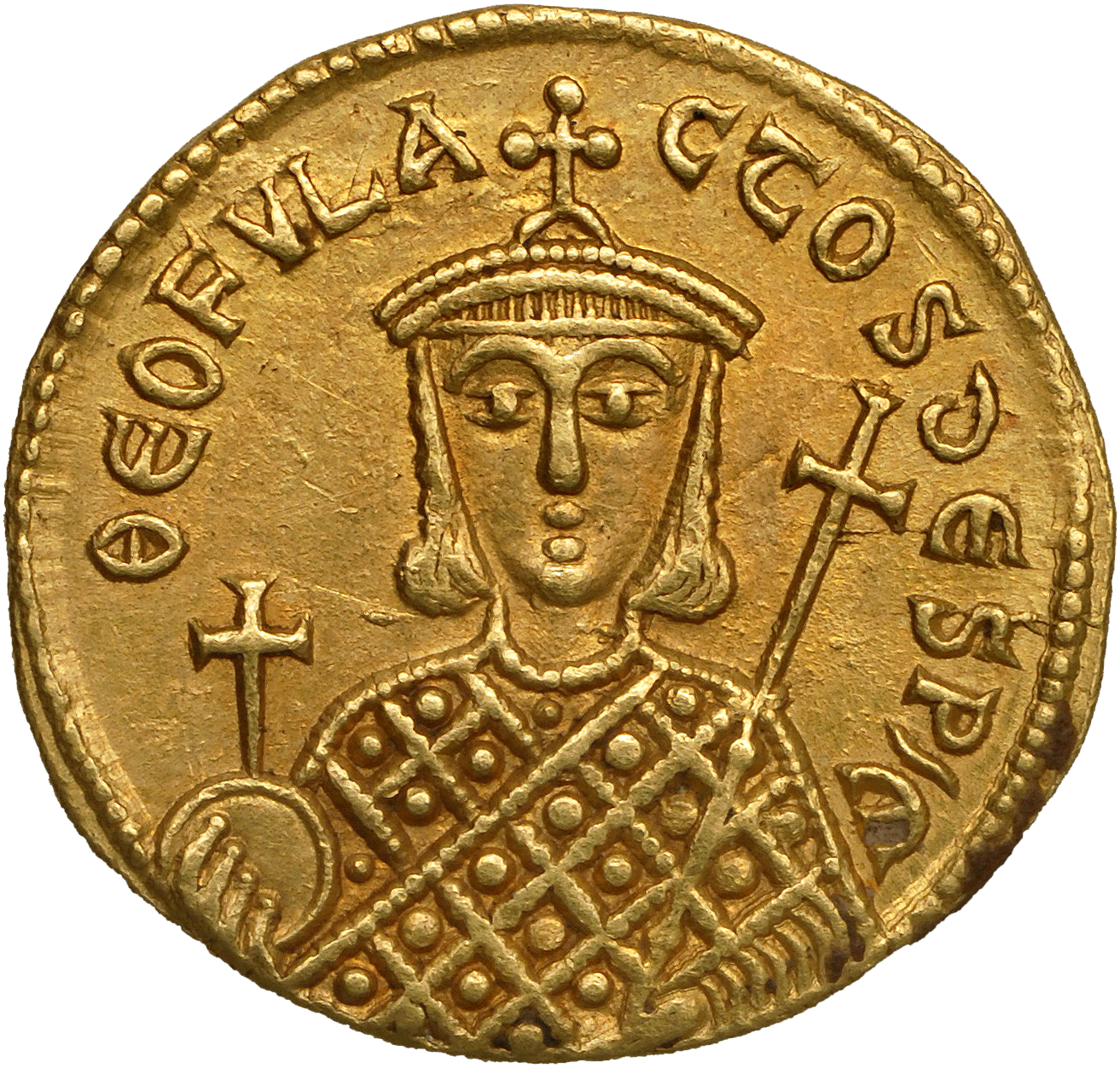
Theophylact, depiction on the reverse of a gold solidus

Theophylact was born to Michael Rhangabe and Prokopia c. 793. He was the couple's oldest child, but the list of his siblings given in the hagiography of Patriarch Ignatius I of Constantinople, who was Theophylact's youngest brother, is unclear on whether he was the eldest child or was born after his oldest sister Gorgo. The same source also states that he was crowned alongside his brother Staurakios. He was named after his paternal grandfather, the droungarios of the Dodekanesos Theophylact Rhangabe, who had participated in a failed conspiracy to wrest the throne from Empress-regent Irene of Athens in 780. Nevertheless his maternal grandfather, the emperor Nikephoros I (r. 802–811), rose to become General Logothete (finance minister) under Empress Irene before eventually deposing her in October 802.

Following the death of Nikephoros in the Battle of Pliska on 26 July 811 and the crippling of his only son and heir Staurakios in the same battle, on 2 October the Byzantine Senate and the tagmata guard units acclaimed Nikephoros's son-in-law Michael Rhangabe as emperor and forced Staurakios to abdicate. Michael immediately set about to consolidate his rule, distributing lavish gifts, crowning his wife as augusta on 12 October, and finally, crowning Theophylact – then aged eighteen – as co-emperor in the Hagia Sophia on Christmas Day, 25 December 811. At about the same time, Michael sent an embassy under Bishop Michael of Synnada to the Frankish court, which among other issues raised the prospect of an imperial marriage between Theophylact and one of Charlemagne's daughters. Despite a warm reception at Aachen and the ratification of a peace treaty between the two realms, Charlemagne, perhaps wary after the repeated failures of successive efforts to that effect over the previous decades, hesitated to agree to such a match.

Nothing further is known of Theophylact until 11 July 813, when Michael, faced with a military revolt under Leo the Armenian, abdicated the throne. Michael and his family sought refuge in the Church of the Virgin of the Pharos, where they were tonsured as monks and nuns. Michael and his sons were castrated to make them incapable of claiming the throne in the future, and exiled to Plate, one of the Princes' Islands in the Sea of Marmara (though the later historians John Skylitzes and Zonaras mention the island of Prote instead). Leo accorded them an annual stipend. According to Theophanes Continuatus, Theophylact, who adopted the monastic name Eustratius (Εὐστράτιος), died five years after his father, on 15 January 849, and was buried alongside him in a church on Plate Island. Theophanes Continuatus also reports that his body (or perhaps that of his father) was later transferred by his brother, Patriarch Ignatios, to the monastery known as "tou Satyrou".

== Sources ==
- Treadgold, Warren (1988). The Byzantine Revival, 780–842. Stanford, California: Stanford University Press. ISBN 978-0-8047-1462-4.
- Lilie, Ralph-Johannes; Ludwig, Claudia; Pratsch, Thomas; Zielke, Beate (2001). "Theophylaktos (#8336)". Prosopographie der mittelbyzantinischen Zeit: 1. Abteilung (641–867), Band 4: Platon (# 6266) – Theophylaktos (# 8345) (in German). Berlin and Boston: De Gruyter. pp. 684–685. ISBN 978-3-11-016674-3.
- Martindale, John Robert, ed. (2001). Michael 7. ISBN 978-1-897747-32-2.
