= Byzantine Empire under the Amorian dynasty =

Period of Byzantine history from 820 to 867

Byzantine Empire: Βασιλεία Ῥωμαίων (Ancient Greek); Imperium Romanum (Latin)
- 820–867
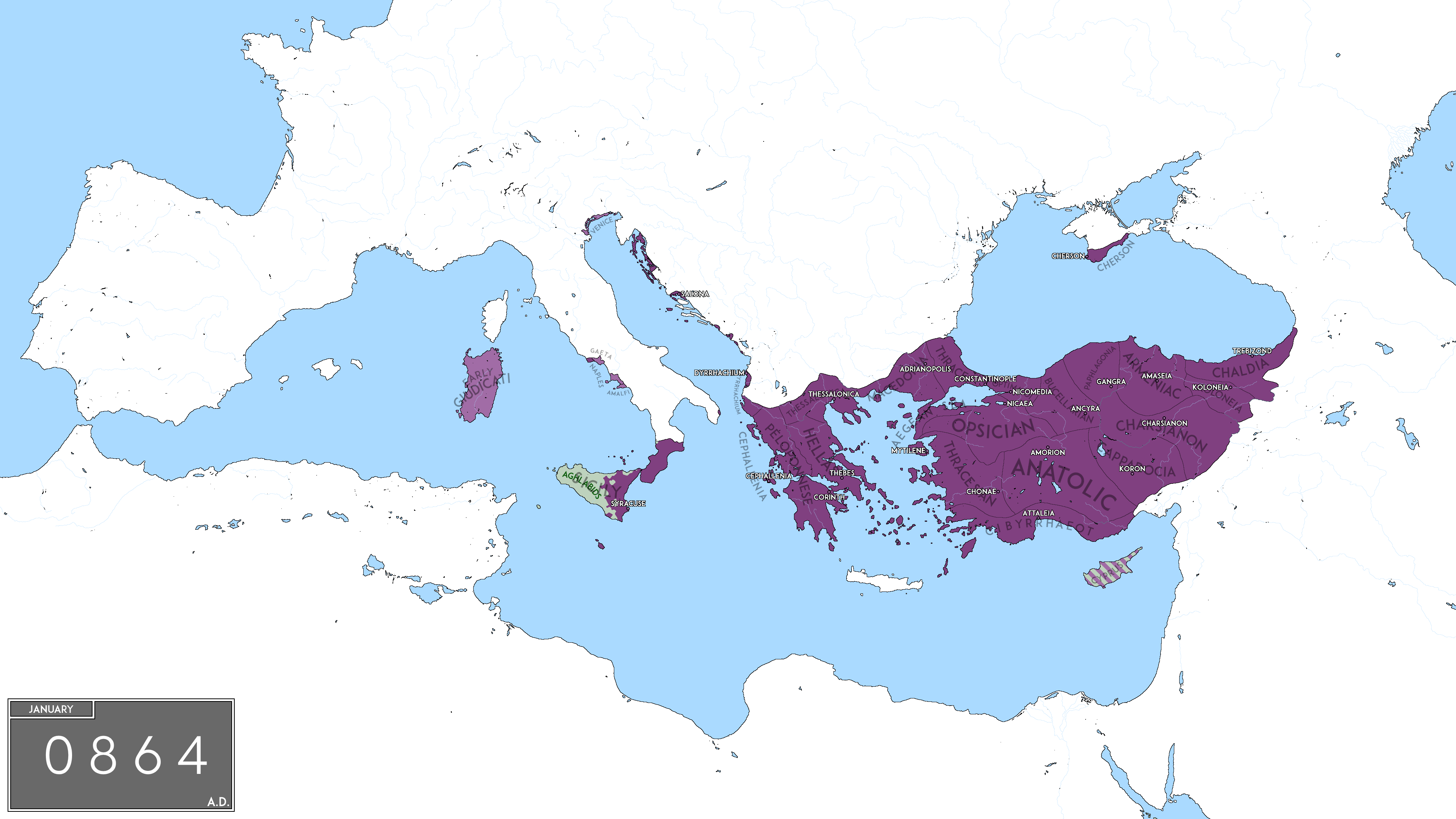
- The Byzantine Empire in 864 AD after the Christianization of Bulgaria.
- Capital: Constantinople
- Common languages: Greek
- Government: Bureaucratic semi-elective monarchy
- Emperor
  - 820–829: Michael II
  - 829–842: Theophilos
  - 842–867: Michael III
- History
  - accession of Michael II: 820
  - assassination of Michael III: 867
Preceded by
Byzantine Empire under the Nikephorian dynasty
Succeeded by
Byzantine Empire under the Macedonian dynasty
First Bulgarian Empire
Emirate of Crete
Emirate of Sicily

The Amorian dynasty (or Phrygian dynasty) ruled the Byzantine Empire from 820 to 867. The Amorian dynasty continued the policy of restored iconoclasm (the "Second Iconoclasm") started by the previous non-dynastic emperor Leo V in 813, until its abolition by Empress Theodora with the help of Patriarch Methodios in 842. The continued iconoclasm further worsened relations between the East and the West, which were already bad following the papal coronations of a rival line of "Roman Emperors" beginning with Charlemagne in 800. Relations worsened even further during the so-called Photian Schism, when Pope Nicholas I challenged Photios' elevation to the patriarchate. However, the era also saw a revival in intellectual activity which was marked by the end of iconoclasm under Michael III, which contributed to the upcoming Macedonian Renaissance.

During the Second Iconoclasm, the Empire began to see systems resembling feudalism being put in place, with large and local landholders becoming increasingly prominent, receiving lands in return for military service to the central government. Similar systems had been in place in the Roman Empire ever since the reign of Severus Alexander during the third century, when Roman soldiers and their heirs were granted lands on the condition of service to the Emperor.

== Michael II ==
Michael was originally a high-ranking soldier serving under Emperor Michael I Rangabe of the Nikephorian dynasty. He aided Leo V in his overthrow of Michael I, but, as relations worsened between Leo and Michael, Leo eventually sentenced Michael to death. In response, Michael led a conspiracy that resulted in the assassination of Leo on Christmas 820. Taking the throne for himself, Michael II was immediately faced with a revolt by Thomas the Slav, which became a civil war that lasted four years and almost cost Michael the throne. Michael continued the practice of iconoclasm, which had been reinvigorated by Leo V.

The reign of Michael II saw two major military disasters that would have permanent effects on the Empire: the beginning of the Muslim conquest of Sicily, and the loss of Crete to the Saracens.

Michael was not popular among the Orthodox clergy, but he would prove himself a competent statesman and administrator, eventually bringing much-needed stability to the Empire following decades of strife and warfare and even restorations of the military. He was succeeded by his only son, Theophilos, upon his death in 829.

== Theophilos ==
Theophilos succeeded Michael II in 829 and was the last Byzantine Emperor to support iconoclasm. Theophilos waged war against the Arabs throughout the entirety of his reign, being forced to war on two fronts as Sicily had been taken and Arab armies continued to march from the East as well. The defence after the invasion of Anatolia by the Abbasid Caliph Al-Ma'mun in 830 was led by the Emperor himself, but the Byzantines were defeated and lost several fortresses. In 831 Theophilos retaliated by leading a large army into Cilicia and capturing Tarsus. The Emperor returned to Constantinople in triumph, but in the autumn he was defeated in Cappadocia. Another defeat in the same province in 833 forced Theophilos to sue for peace, which he obtained the next year, after the death of Al-Ma'mun.

War continued, and Theophilos personally led armies into Mesopotamia in 837, capturing Melitene and Arsamosata with a massive army numbering 70,000. Further battles and attacks would take place until Theophilos died of disease in 842. He was succeeded by his son Michael III.

== Michael III ==
Michael III would play a vital role in the Byzantine resurgence of the 9th century. As Michael was merely two years old when his father died, the Empire was governed by a regency headed by his mother Theodora, her uncle Sergios, and the minister Theoktistos. The empress had iconodule sympathies and deposed the patriarch, John VII, replacing him with the iconodule Methodios I in 843. This put an end to the second spell of iconoclasm. Michael and his supporters overthrew this regency in 857, becoming Emperor proper.

His reign would see continued war against the Arabs and due to his pleasure-loving nature he was nicknamed "the Drunkard" by later chroniclers sympathetic to his murderer and successor Basil I.

== Family tree ==
Nikephoros I emperor of the Romans; 802-811; NIKEPHORIAN DYNASTY
Irene of Athens empress of the Romans; 797-802	Theophano of Athens	Staurakios emperor of the Romans; 811	Prokopia	Michael I Rangabe emperor of the Romans; 811-813
Bardanes Tourkos	Maria of Amnia	Constantine VI emperor of the Romans; 780-797
Leo V the Armenian emperor of the Romans; 813-820	Barka	1.Thekla	Michael II emperor of the Romans; 820-829; AMORIAN/PHRYGIAN; DYNASTY	2.Euphrosyne	Anastasios Martinakios
(1) Theophilos emperor of the Romans; 829-842	saint Theodora from Paphlagonia	Inger Martinakios
Anna nun	Constantine prince	Michael III emperor of the Romans; 842-867	Eudokia Ingerina	Basil I emperor of the Romans; 867-886; MACEDONIAN DYNASTY

== Timeline ==
- Red denotes Senior Emperors
- Pink denotes Junior Emperors

== See also ==
- Family tree of Byzantine emperors
