= Staurakios (son of Michael I) =

Byzantine co-emperor from 811 to 811/812/813

- Emperor of the Romans

Byzantine emperor
- Co-reign: 25 December 811 – bef. 11 July 813
- Predecessor: Michael I Rangabe
- Successor: Leo V the Armenian
- Senior emperor: Michael I Rangabe
- Born: ca. 800 bef. 11 July 813
- Dynasty: Nikephorian dynasty
- Father: Michael I Rangabe
- Mother: Prokopia

Staurakios or Stauracius (Greek: Σταυράκιος, romanized: Staurákios; ca. 800 – bef. 11 July 813) was the third son of the Byzantine emperor Michael I Rangabe (r. 811–813) and grandson, on his mother's side, of Nikephoros I (r. 802–811). He was junior co-emperor alongside his father during the latter's reign.

== Biography ==
Staurakios was born to Michael Rhangabe and Prokopia. He was the couple's third child, according to the list of his siblings given in the hagiography of Patriarch Ignatius I of Constantinople. The same source also states that he was crowned alongside his brother Theophylakt. He was named after his maternal uncle, emperor Staurakios.

Following the death of Nikephoros in the Battle of Pliska on 26 July 811 and the crippling of his only son and heir Staurakios in the same battle, on 2 October the Byzantine Senate and the tagmata guard units acclaimed Nikephoros's son-in-law Michael Rhangabe as emperor and forced Staurakios to abdicate. Michael immediately set about to consolidate his rule, distributing lavish gifts, crowning his wife as augusta on 12 October, and finally, crowning Staurakios as co-emperor in the Hagia Sophia on Christmas Day, 25 December 811.

Nothing further is known of Staurakios rather than he died in unknown circumstances before 11 July 813, when Michael, faced with a military revolt under Leo the Armenian, abdicated the throne. He pre-deceased his father.

== Sources ==
- Treadgold, Warren (1988). The Byzantine Revival, 780–842. Stanford, California: Stanford University Press. ISBN 978-0-8047-1462-4.
- Lilie, Ralph-Johannes; Ludwig, Claudia; Pratsch, Thomas; Zielke, Beate (2001). "Theophylaktos (#8336)". Prosopographie der mittelbyzantinischen Zeit: 1. Abteilung (641–867), Band 4: Platon (# 6266) – Theophylaktos (# 8345) (in German). Berlin and Boston: De Gruyter. pp. 684–685. ISBN 978-3-11-016674-3.
- Martindale, John Robert, ed. (2001). Michael 7. ISBN 978-1-897747-32-2.
