= Theoktistos (magistros) =

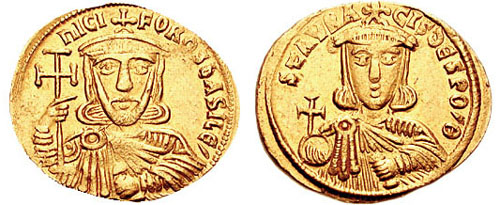

Theoktistos (Greek: Θεόκτιστος; fl. 802–821) was a senior Byzantine official who played an important role under the Nikephorian dynasty (802–813).

Theoktistos is first mentioned in 802, when he held the rank of patrikios and the post of quaestor. From this post he supported the deposition of Empress Irene of Athens (ruled 797–802) and her replacement by Nikephoros I (r. 802–811). He remained active in Nikephoros' administration, and by the time of the Emperor's death in the Battle of Pliska in 811 he had advanced to the rank of magistros. He was among those who agreed to the accession of Nikephoros' son Staurakios to the imperial throne. Staurakios, however, had himself been grievously wounded in the battle, and Theoktistos, along with the Domestic of the Schools Stephen and the Patriarch Nikephoros, pushed through his replacement by his brother-in–law, the kouropalates Michael I Rangabe (r. 811–813)—although, if the narrative of Theophanes the Confessor, an admittedly hostile source, is to be believed, the decision was also influenced by the insulting manner in which Staurakios treated the senior officials, Theoktistos included. Throughout his brief reign, Michael Rangabe was completely dependent on the senior officials who had raised him to the throne. In 813, Theoktistos was a member of the group of officials which successfully advocated a war with Bulgaria. Theoktistos accompanied the army, but the campaign ended in a heavy defeat at the Battle of Versinikia. With a few other officials, Theoktistos was able to escape the disaster.

Some time after that he withdrew to a monastery under the famed Theodore Stoudites, with whom he had corresponded. His retirement was possibly related to the abdication of Michael I and the accession of Leo V the Armenian (r. 813–820). Theoktistos is still recorded as being alive and in the monastery in 821.

== Sources ==
- Winkelmann, Friedhelm; Lilie, Ralph-Johannes; et al. (2001). "Theoktistos (# 8046)". Prosopographie der mittelbyzantinischen Zeit: I. Abteilung (641–867), 4. Band: Platon (#6266) – Theophylaktos (#8345) (in German). Walter de Gruyter. p. 576. ISBN 3-11-016674-7.
