= Pax Nicephori =

802–815 negotiations between the Frankish and Byzantine Empires

Pax Nicephori, Latin for the "Peace of Nicephorus", is a term used to refer to both a peace treaty of 803, tentatively concluded between emperors Charlemagne, of the Frankish empire, and Nikephoros I, of the Byzantine Empire, and the outcome of negotiations that took place between the same parties, but were concluded by successor emperors, between 811 and 814. The whole set of negotiations of the years 802–815 has also been referred to by this name. By its terms, after several years of diplomatic exchanges, the Byzantine emperor's representatives recognized the authority in the West of Charlemagne, and East and West negotiated their boundaries in the Adriatic Sea.

== Failed negotiations of 803 ==
On Christmas Day in 800 AD, Pope Leo III crowned Charlemagne as Imperator Romanorum (Latin for "Emperor of the Romans") in Saint Peter's Basilica. Nikephoros I of the Byzantine Empire and Charlemagne tried to settle their imperial boundaries in 803. A first treaty was indeed prepared and sent to the East in 803 by Charlemagne, who had started talks with Empress Irene. The text, however, was never ratified by Nikephoros, as the Royal Frankish Annals, and Charlemagne in a surviving document, explicitly state. The Franks had already subdued the March of Istria in 788, and after overturning the Avar khaganate, they claimed the rich Pannonian plain and the Dalmatian coast; during these events, Slavic prince Vojnomir of Pannonia allied with the Franks. Duchy of Croatia which was in the territory of former Dalmatia (Roman province) did not include Byzantine Dalmatia (theme) of Dalmatian city-states.

== Further talks between 803 and 806 ==
Though Nikephoros always refused to recognize Charlemagne's imperial title, envoys of the East and West made agreements over the possession of disputed Italian territory, namely, the provinces of Venetia and Dalmatian Croatia (i.e. Duchy of Croatia and Byzantine theme of Dalmatia), during the first decade of the ninth century. These seem to have been advantageous to the Venetians and to have guaranteed Byzantine sovereignty over them.

== War and peace, 806–814 ==
Temporary shift of Venetian loyalties toward the Franks resulted in somewhat permanent naval conflict in the Adriatic, only interrupted by a truce in 807–808. After Charlemagne's son and king of Italy Pippin's invasion of Dalmatia tension rose between the two Empires. Political and military instability, however, lasted only until the king's death, in July 810. Then a new treaty came under discussion between Charlemagne, temporarily ruling over Italy, and Nikephoros. Aigone, Count of Forlì, was a member of the delegation sent by Charlemagne to Nikephoros. The agreement was signed.

Thus the name pax Nicephori may be justifiably applied to this second episode of diplomatic activity. However, only Michael I Rhangabes recognized Charlemagne's imperial title, reserving for the East the title "Emperor of the Romans", and the treaty was not definitely ratified until four years later, after both Michael's and Charlemagne's death, by Louis the Pious and Leo V. Some amendments, more advantageous to Venice, are thought to have been added then.

The peace of Aachen in 812 confirmed Dalmatian Croatia, except for the Byzantine cities and islands, as under Frankish domain. The boundaries in Dalmatia imposed by this treaty were unclear, so in 817 Leo V sent en embassy to Aachen to clarify them. The result was a joint Frankish and Byzantine expedition to Dalmatia to get the input of the local Romans and Slavs and firmly delimit the borders.

== Buffer states ==
The common belief that the negotiations between Byzantium and the Franks that were held in the early ninth century made Venice an 'independent polity' is only based on the late, allusive and biased witness of Venetian chroniclers such as John the Deacon and Andrea Dandolo and remains therefore highly questionable.

== Sources and documents ==
No text of either the treaty, its draft or the preceding negotiations is preserved, apart from a handful of alleged quotations in a mid-century deliberation of Emperor Lothar I in favour of one of the earliest certainly attested Doges of Venice.

== Sources ==
- Dzino, Danijel (2010). Becoming Slav, Becoming Croat: Identity Transformations in Post-Roman and Early Medieval Dalmatia. Brill. ISBN 9789004186460.
- Roberto CESSI. Pacta Veneta, 1–2. Archivio Veneto 4–5 (1928–1929).
- John Julius Norwich. A History of Venice. New York 1982.
- Translation of letter from Charlemagne to Nikephoros I in 811.
