= Prokopia =

Byzantine empress from 811 to 813

- Augusta

Empress of the Byzantine Empire
- Tenure: 811–813
- Born: c. 770
- Died: after 813
- Spouse: Michael I Rhangabe
- Issue Detail: Georgo; Theophylaktos; Niketas; Staurakios; Theophano
- Father: Nikephoros I

Prokopia (Greek: Προκοπία, romanized: Prokopía; c. 770 – after 813) was the empress consort of Michael I Rhangabe of the Byzantine Empire. She was a daughter of Nikephoros I. The name of her mother is not known. Her only known sibling is Staurakios.

== Marriage ==
Prokopia married Michael Rhangabe during the late 8th century. He was a son of Theophylaktos Rhangabe, admiral of the Aegean fleet.

In 802, the reigning empress Irene was deposed by an alliance of patricians and eunuchs. Their leader was Prokopia's father Nikephoros, the finance minister (logothetēs tou genikou). On 31 October 802, Nikephoros was declared to be the next emperor, making Prokopia a member of the imperial family. Her husband received the high court dignity of kouropalatēs.

On 26 July 811, Nikephoros was killed while fighting against Krum of Bulgaria at the Battle of Pliska. Much of the Byzantine army was annihilated with him in what is considered one of the worst defeats in Roman history. Among the few survivors was Staurakios, who succeeded him as emperor.

Staurakios had not escaped the battlefield unharmed. A sword wound near his neck had left him paralyzed. Members of the imperial guard had managed to transfer him to Adrianople but he never fully recovered. The matter of Staurakios' succession was deemed urgent and two factions emerged at court. One centered on Theophano, wife of the emperor, who reportedly sought to succeed her husband. The other centered on Prokopia, who intended to place her husband on the throne.

Prokopia failed to persuade her brother to go along with her wishes at first. He apparently favored Theophano. However Michael and Prokopia had gathered enough support at court to threaten Staurakios himself. Unable to face this opposition in his condition, Staurakios declared his brother-in-law as his designated heir and abdicated at the same time. He then retired to a monastery. Prokopia had become the new empress consort.

== Empress ==
On 2 October 811, Michael I Rhangabe succeeded to the throne and Prokopia became the empress consort. Historical and contemporary sources describe Michael himself as “amiable to a fault, lacking in judgment and easily led”. During Michael's brief reign, Prokopia effectively held dominance over the court, advising him on what he should do and what he should avoid, and taking whatever she wished from the imperial treasury. She insisted on following her husband in campaigns but her presence reportedly was not welcomed by the troops.

Michael generously distributed money to the army, the bureaucracy, and the Church in an effort to establish himself. He also reopened negotiations with Charlemagne and recognized the rival emperor as basileus (emperor) (but not as Emperor of the Romans). However the war with Krum continued and would bring the downfall of the imperial couple.

On 22 June 813, Michael's forces lost the Battle of Versinikia. The imperial army was significantly larger than the Bulgarian but failed to use its size to its advantage. Michael was among the first to retreat from the battlefield and other units followed his lead. Krum advanced to East Thrace and Constantinople itself had become a viable target. Whatever support Michael and Prokopia had managed to gain did not long survive the military defeat.

On 11 July 813, Michael abdicated the throne in favor of Leo V the Armenian. Theophanes Continuatus, the continuation to the chronicle of Theophanes the Confessor, records that Prokopia opposed the abdication to no avail.

While Michael and his sons were exiled to the Princes' Islands, Prokopia moved to a private monastery which appears to have been constructed earlier in Constantinople according to her orders. Her year of death is not known.

== Children ==
Prokopia and Michael I had at least five children:

- Theophylaktos (c. 792 – 15 January 849), co-emperor from 812 to 813. He was castrated and exiled to a monastery. His date of death was recorded by Theophanes Continuatus.
- Staurakios (c. 793 – 813). Died prior to the abdication of his father. Circumstances unknown.
- Niketas (c. 797 – 23 October 877). He was castrated and exiled to a monastery. Later emerged as Patriarch Ignatios of Constantinople.
- Gorgo. Became a nun.
- Theophano. Became a nun.

Ignatios was later declared a saint. His hagiography records one of his sisters having helped iconodules during the persecutions of Theophilos (r. 829–842). However which one is unclear.

A hagiography cites that Paul of Xeropotamou (born Procopius), who also became a saint of the Orthodox Church, was another son.

Royal titles
Preceded by Theophano	Byzantine Empress consort 811–813	Succeeded by Theodosia
Preceded by Irene of Athens	Empress-Mother of the Byzantine Empire; 812–813	Succeeded by Theodosia
