= Theophylact Rhangabe =

Byzantine Greek admiral

Theophylact Rhangabe or Theophylaktos Rhangabe (Greek: Θεοφύλακτος, ὁ τοῦ Ῥαγγαβέ, romanized: Theophylaktos Rhangabé, fl. 780), was a Byzantine Greek admiral, and the father of the emperor Michael I Rhangabe (ruled 811–813).

== Life ==
He is known only from his participation, along with several other high-ranking officials, in a failed conspiracy in 780 to wrest the throne from Empress-regent Irene and to raise in her stead Nikephoros, the eldest surviving son of Constantine V (r. 741–775). At the time, he held the post of droungarios (admiral) of the Dodekanesos (roughly the southern Aegean Sea). After the plot was discovered, Irene had the conspirators publicly whipped, tonsured and banished.

== Sources ==
- Venning, T., ed. (2006). A Chronology of the Byzantine Empire. Palgrave Macmillan.
- Treadgold, Warren T. (1988), The Byzantine Revival, 780–842, Stanford, CA: Stanford University Press, pp. 60–61, 128, 405 (n. 163), ISBN 0-8047-1462-2
- Winkelmann, Friedhelm; Lilie, Ralph-Johannes; et al. (2001). "Theophylaktos (#8294)". Prosopographie der mittelbyzantinischen Zeit: I. Abteilung (641–867), 4. Band: Platon (#6266) – Theophylaktos #8345) (in German). Walter de Gruyter. pp. 672–673. ISBN 3-11-016674-7.
