= Byzantine Empire under the Nikephorian dynasty =

Period of Byzantine history from 802 to 813

Byzantine Empire: Βασιλεία Ῥωμαίων (Ancient Greek); Imperium Romanum (Latin)
- 802–813
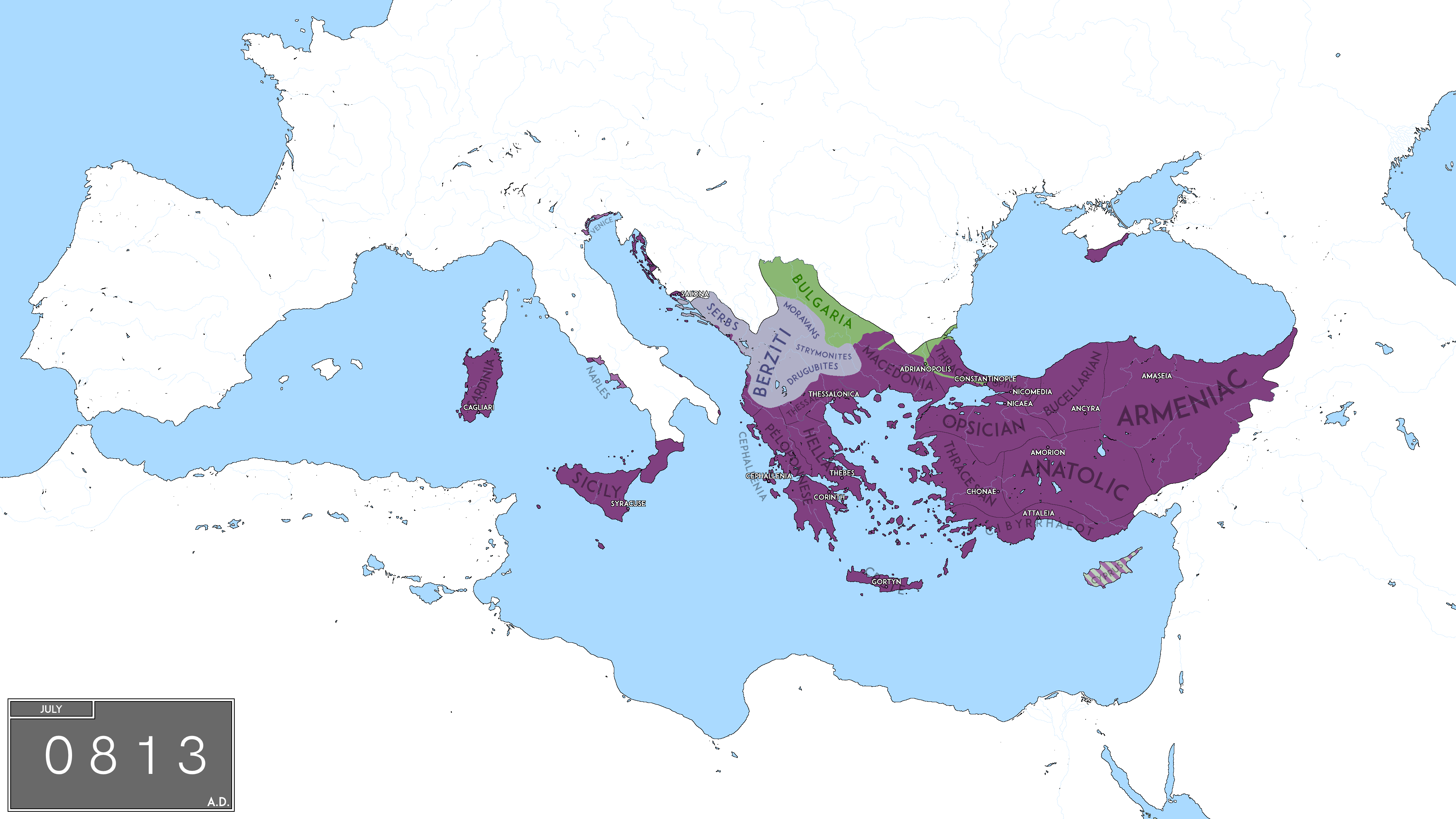
- The Byzantine Empire in 813, after the abdication of Michael I
- Capital: Constantinople
- Common languages: Greek
- Government: Bureaucratic semi-elective monarchy
- Emperor
  - 802–811: Nikephoros I
  - 811: Staurakios
  - 811–813: Michael I Rangabe
- History
  - Accession of Nikephoros I: 802
  - Abdication of Michael I: 813
Preceded by	Succeeded by
Byzantine Empire under the Isaurian dynasty	Byzantine Empire under the Amorian dynasty

The Nikephorian dynasty of the Byzantine Empire began following the deposition of the Empress Irene of Athens. The throne of the Byzantine Empire passed to a relatively short-lived dynasty, the Nikephorian dynasty, named after its founder, Nikephoros I. The empire was in a weaker and more precarious position than it had been for a long time and its finances were problematic.

During this era Byzantium was almost continually at war on two frontiers which drained its resources, and like many of his predecessors, Nikephoros (802–811) himself died while campaigning against the Bulgars to the north. Furthermore, Byzantium's influence continued to wane in the west with the crowning of Charlemagne (800–814) as Holy Roman emperor by Pope Leo III at Old St. Peter's Basilica in Rome in the year 800 and the establishment of a new empire in Western Europe laying claim to the universal Roman monarchy.

== Nikephoros I, 802–811 ==
Nikephoros I had been the empire's finance minister and on Irene's deposition immediately embarked on a series of fiscal reforms. His administrative reforms included re-organisation of the themata. He survived a civil war in 803 and, like most of the Byzantine emperors, found himself at war on three fronts. He suffered a major defeat at the Battle of Krasos in Phrygia in 805 and died on a campaign against the Bulgars.

== Nikephoros' successors, 811–813 ==
Nikephoros was succeeded by his son and co-emperor, Staurakios (811). However, he was severely wounded in the same battle in which his father died and, after much controversy regarding the succession, was persuaded to abdicate later that year by the husband of his sister Prokopia, Michael I (811–813), who succeeded him.

Michael I pursued more diplomatic than military solutions. However, he engaged the Bulgar Khan Krum, the same who claimed the lives of his two predecessors, and was also defeated, severely weakening his position. Aware of a likely revolt he chose to abdicate given the grisly fate of so many prior overthrown emperors, ending the brief dynasty of Nikephoros.

== Family tree of the Nikephorian dynasty ==
Constantine V Byzantine Emperor; 741–775; ISAURIAN/SYRIAN dynasty	Tzitzak (Irene) of the Khazars	Nikephoros I Byzantine Emperor; 802–811
related
Leo IV the Khazar; Byzantine Emperor; 751–775	Irene of Athens	Theophano of Athens	Staurakios; Byzantine Emperor; 803–811	Prokopia	Michael I Rangabe; Byzantine Emperor; 811–813
Constantine VI; Byzantine Emperor; 780–797 ∞ Maria of Amnia	Bardanes rebel
Euphrosyne	Michael II; Byzantine Emperor; 820–829; AMORIAN/PHRYGIAN; DYNASTY	Thekla	1. Barka	Leo V the Armenian; Byzantine Emperor; 813–820	2. Theodosia

== See also ==
- Family tree of Byzantine emperors
- History of the Byzantine Empire
