= Michael I Rangabe =

Byzantine emperor from 811 to 813

- Emperor of the Romans
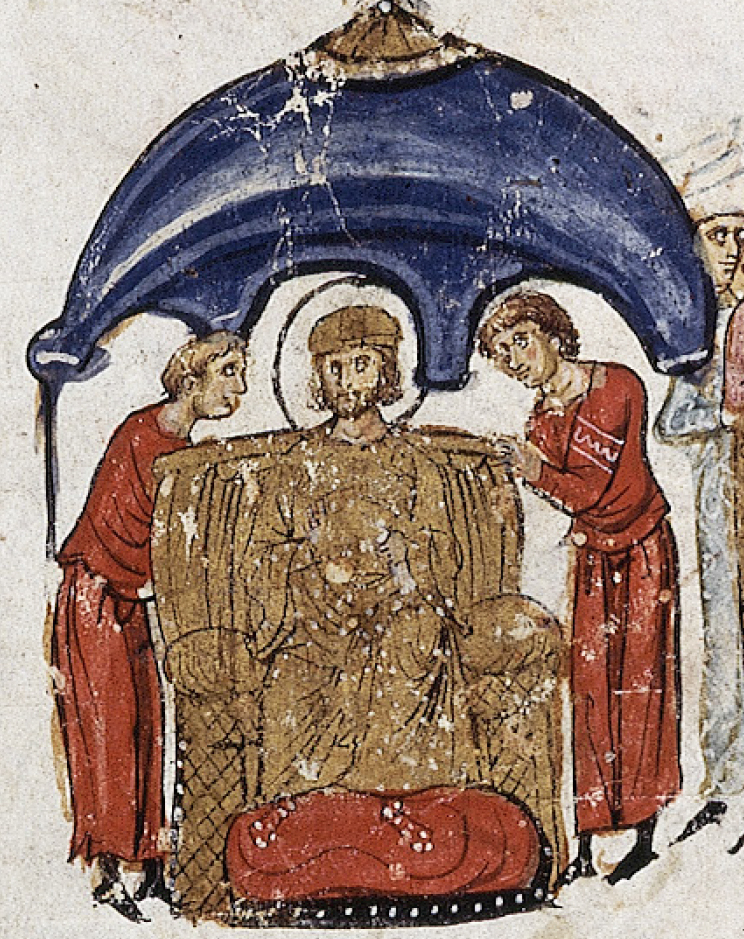
- Michael I, as depicted in the 12th-century Madrid Skylitzes.

Byzantine emperor
- Reign: 2 October 811 – 11 July 813
- Coronation: 2 October 811; Hagia Sophia
- Predecessor: Staurakios
- Successor: Leo V
- Co-emperors: Theophylact (811–813); Staurakios (811–811/2/3)
- Born: c. 770
- Died: 11 January 844 (aged 73); Prote Island (now Kınalıada, Turkey)
- Burial: Church on Prote Island, transferred to the Monastery of Satyros
- Spouse: Prokopia
- Issue: Georgo; Theophylaktos; Niketas; Staurakios; Theophano
Names
- Michael Rangabe
- Dynasty: Nikephorian
- Father: Theophylact Rhangabe

Michael I Rangabe (also spelled Rhangabe; Greek: Μιχαὴλ Αʹ Ῥαγκαβές, romanized: Mikhaḗl 1 Rhangkabés; c. 770 – 11 January 844) was Byzantine emperor from 811 to 813. A courtier of Emperor Nikephoros I (r. 802–811), he survived the disastrous campaign against the Bulgars and was preferred as imperial successor over Staurakios (r. 811–811), who was severely injured. He was proclaimed emperor by Patriarch Nicephorus I of Constantinople on 2 October 811.

Michael's policies were generally conciliatory, and he was overwhelmingly influenced by the iconodule clerics Nikephoros and Theodore the Stoudite. He improved relations with the Franks, even to the point of recognising Charlemagne as an emperor – although not "of the Romans" – and requesting papal arbitration in the Moechian controversy. His half-hearted leadership of the campaign against the Bulgars resulted in defeat in the Battle of Versinikia. The stratēgos of the Anatolic Theme, Leo the Armenian, a popular and successful general, abandoned Michael on the battlefield but was proclaimed emperor by the military, in what was the last military overthrow of an emperor in Byzantine history. Michael was pressured to abdicate, and he retired to a monastery. His sons were castrated to prevent the continuation of his dynasty.

== Biography ==
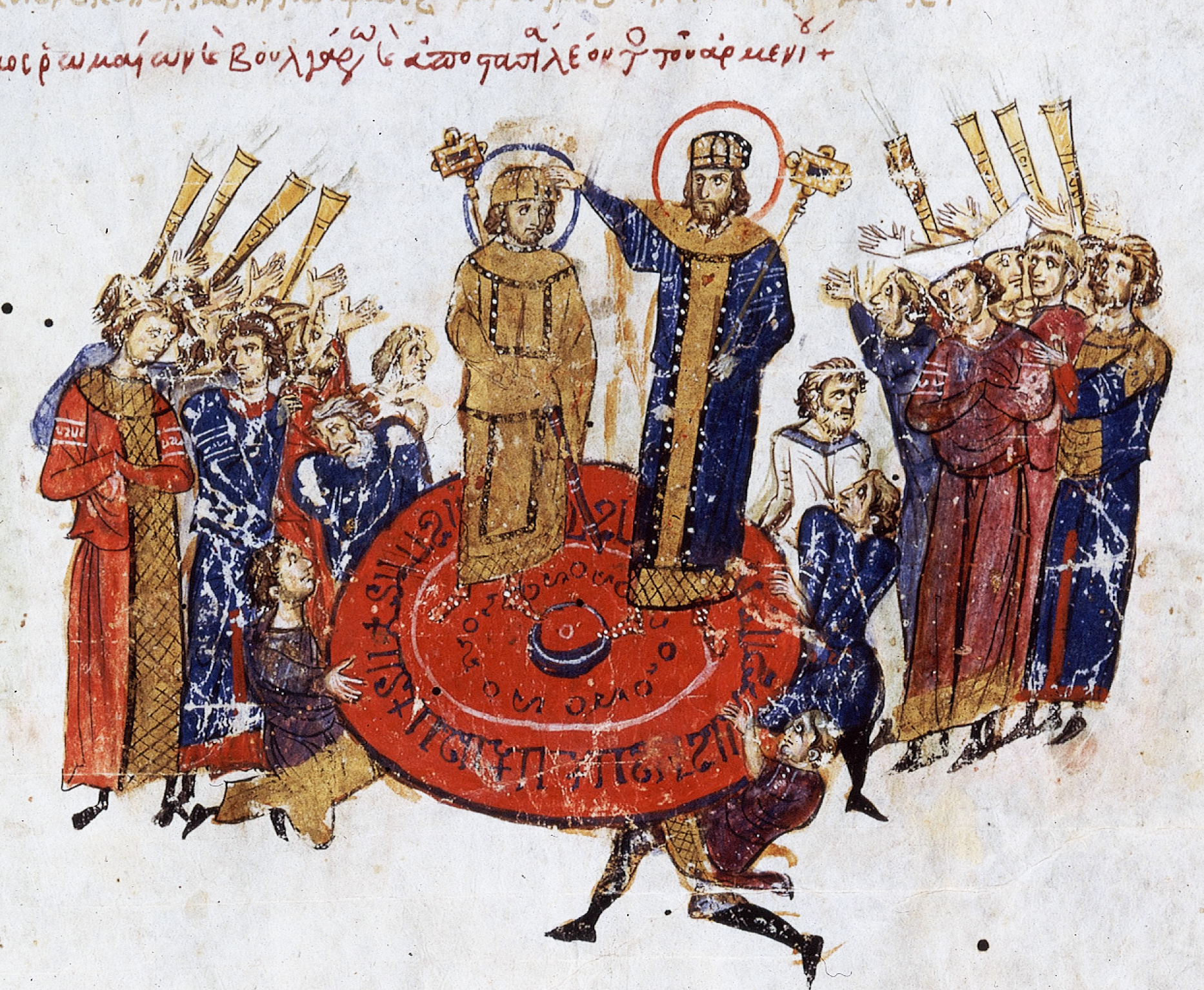
Coronation of Michael I and his son Theophylact (left) upon a shield, from the 12th-century Madrid Skylitzes, probably drawn from an earlier unrelated source.

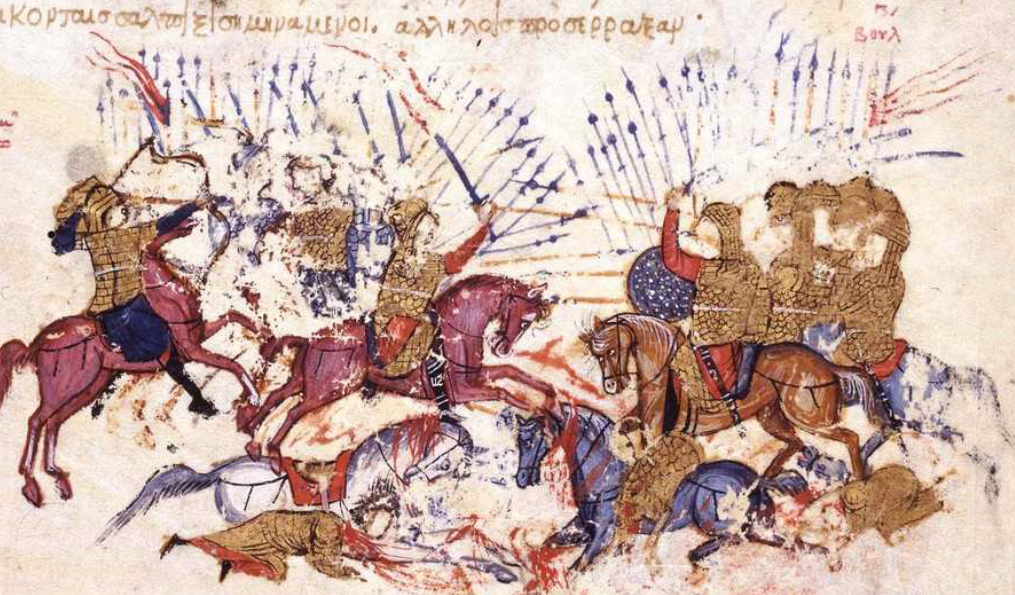
Byzantines and Bulgars clash at Versinikia in 813.

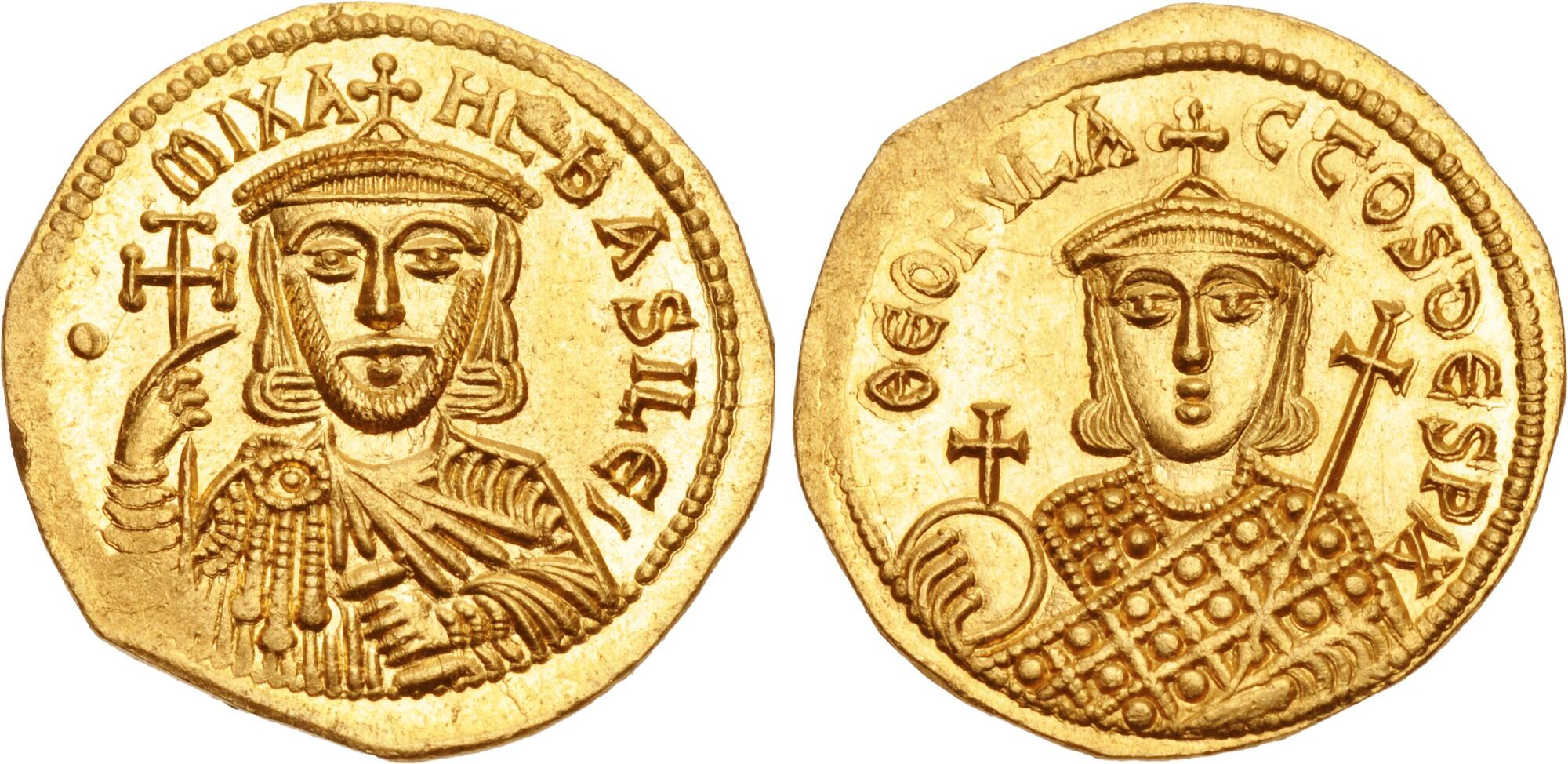
Solidus of Michael I Rangabe and his son Theophylact

Michael was the son of the patrician Theophylact Rhangabe, the admiral of the Aegean fleet. The Rangabe family was of Greek origin. He married Prokopia, the daughter of the future Emperor Nikephoros I, and received the high court dignity of Kouropalates after his father-in-law's accession in 802.

Michael survived Nikephoros I's disastrous campaign against Khan Krum of Bulgaria, and was considered a more appropriate candidate for the throne than his severely injured brother-in-law Staurakios, who was proclaimed emperor by the military in the hope that he would recover. When Michael's wife Prokopia failed to persuade her brother Staurakios, who wanted to have him blinded, to name Michael as his successor, a group of senior officials (the magistros Theoktistos, Domestic of the Schools Stephen, and Patriarch Nicephorus I of Constantinople) forced Staurakios to abdicate in his favour on 2 October 811. Michael was proclaimed emperor before the senate and the tagmata.

Michael I attempted to carry out a policy of reconciliation, abandoning the exacting taxation instituted by Nikephoros I. While reducing imperial income, Michael generously distributed money to the army, the bureaucracy, and the church. Ruling with the support of the iconodule party in the Church, Michael I diligently persecuted the iconoclasts and forced Patriarch Nicephorus I to back down in his dispute with Theodore the Stoudite, the influential abbot of the monastery of Stoudios. He revoked the exile of Theodore the Stoudites effected by Emperor Nikephoros I, and Theodore became his close confidant. Michael I's piety won him a very positive estimation in the work of the chronicler Theophanes the Confessor. Theophanes also mentions the existence of a group of heretics known as Athinganoi in Phrygia, who were most likely the successors of the Montanists, who Emperor Leo III the Isaurian (r. 717–741) attempted to convert by force, as well as of the Paulicians. Patriarch Nicephorus I pressed Michael I to organise the persecution and execution of the Athinganoi, Paulicians and iconoclast abbots. But when Nicephorus I insisted the heretics be given time to repent, Michael I halted the killings.

In 812, Michael reopened negotiations with the Franks, and recognized Charlemagne as imperator and basileus ("emperor"), but not "Emperor of the Romans". (Note: eum imperatorem et basileum appellantes, cf. Royal Frankish Annals, a, 812.) In exchange for that recognition, Venice and Istria were returned to the Empire. Michael I sent ambassadors to negotiate a marriage alliance between Michael's son Theophylact and a Frankish princess. They also brought a letter from Patriarch Nicephorus I requesting papal arbitration on the issue of the Moechian controversy. Pope Leo III resolved the issue in favour of Theodore the Stoudites, who claimed that, as emperors were bound by canon law, Constantine VI's second marriage was illicit, which was the view of Empress Irene against Emperor Nikephoros. The Pope's judgment was treated as the formal closing of the affair.

There were also minor successes against the Arabs in the Anatolic Theme under its stratēgos Leo the Armenian, another figure exiled by Nikephoros and recalled by Michael. However, Michael dealt with the Bulgars poorly during his reign. In 812, Khan Krum besieged the frontier town of Develtos in Thrace, and Michael was too late to prevent its surrender. His soldiers mutinied, and people in western Thrace began to flee their homes. Some soldiers of the tagmata tried to proclaim the blinded sons of Constantine V as emperors, but Michael dismissed them in disgrace. The Bulgars nevertheless managed to capture almost all of the fortified towns on the Byzantine-Bulgarian border that were built and consolidated by Empress Irene and Emperors Constantine VI and Nikephoros in the previous decades. Michael was convinced by Nikephoros and Theodore to reject the peace terms offered by Krum, which involved the return of Christians who fled from Bulgarian territory, provoking the capture of Mesembria (Nesebar) by the Bulgars, the last border stronghold, executing all captives who refused to renounce Christianity. Michael I's army prepared for a major engagement at Versinikia near Adrianople, but delayed his attack, leading to further discontent in the military. In June, he began the attack but appeared hesitant; Leo the Armenian fled halfway through the battle, causing a rout. This prompted suspicion of treachery, however, Leo was acclaimed emperor with the support of his soldiers. Once he arrived in Constantinople, Michael I was pressured to retire to a monastery. Leo was crowned by Patriarch Nicephorus I on 12 July 813.

With conspiracy in the air, Michael I preempted events by abdicating on 11 July 813 in favour of Leo the Armenian and becoming a monk (under the name Athanasios). His sons were castrated to end the dynasty and were relegated to monasteries, with one of them, Niketas (renamed Ignatios), eventually becoming Ecumenical Patriarch of Constantinople. Michael I died on 11 January 844.

=== Numismatics ===
The numismatic record of Michael's reign begins after his son's coronation as co-emperor in 811, with new nomismata struck, bearing Michael I on the obverse and Theophylact (son of Michael I) on the reverse. The miliarēsion, which had not been struck since the reign of Constantine VI (r. 780–797), was revived by Michael I with a notable alteration. The imperial title basileis was expanded to basileis romaion ("emperors of the Romans"), seemingly in response to Pope Leo III's coronation of Charlemagne as emperor in 800.

== Assessment and legacy ==
The reigns of the iconoclast emperors Leo III the Isaurian (r. 717–741) and Constantine V (r. 741–775) were militarily successful and saw the abatement of the Arab and Bulgar threat. According to the iconodule Patriarch Nicephorus I of Constantinople, Leo III the Isaurian propaganda ascribed both their military successes and longevity to their iconoclasm. The validity of iconoclasm was only confirmed by the military disasters under the iconodule emperors Michael I and his predecessor Nikephoros I (r. 802–811) as well as the success of the iconoclast Leo V the Armenian (r. 813–820) against the Bulgars. Michael I was in general a weak emperor whose policies were formed in mere reaction to outside pressures. Warren Treadgold describes him as "amiable to a fault, lacking in judgment and easily led", "dithering", seeming "to have done whatever he had been told most recently". He was also the last Byzantine emperor to be overthrown by the military, which is ironic given its increased strength in succeeding centuries.

In 813, Carolingian Emperor Charlemagne crowned his son Louis the Pious co-emperor in a manner resembling Michael I's crowning of his own son, Theophylact, in 811. This was likely because of the Byzantine practice of inviting foreign ambassadors to witness state rituals. Accepting one such invitation, Hugh of Tours, Count of Tours, and Haito, Bishop of Basel, were present for Michael I's crowning of his son, and so probably returned to the Frankish court with knowledge of Byzantine ceremonies.

== Family ==
By his wife Prokopia, Michael I had at least five children:

- Georgo, a daughter, became a nun after 813;
- Theophylact, crowned co-emperor on Christmas 811, became a monk after 813;
- Niketas, became a monk after 813, later Patriarch Ignatios of Constantinople (c. 798–877);
- Staurakios, crowned co-emperor on Christmas 811, pre-deceased his father's abdication, circumstances unknown;
- Theophano, a daughter, became a nun after 813.

== Gallery ==
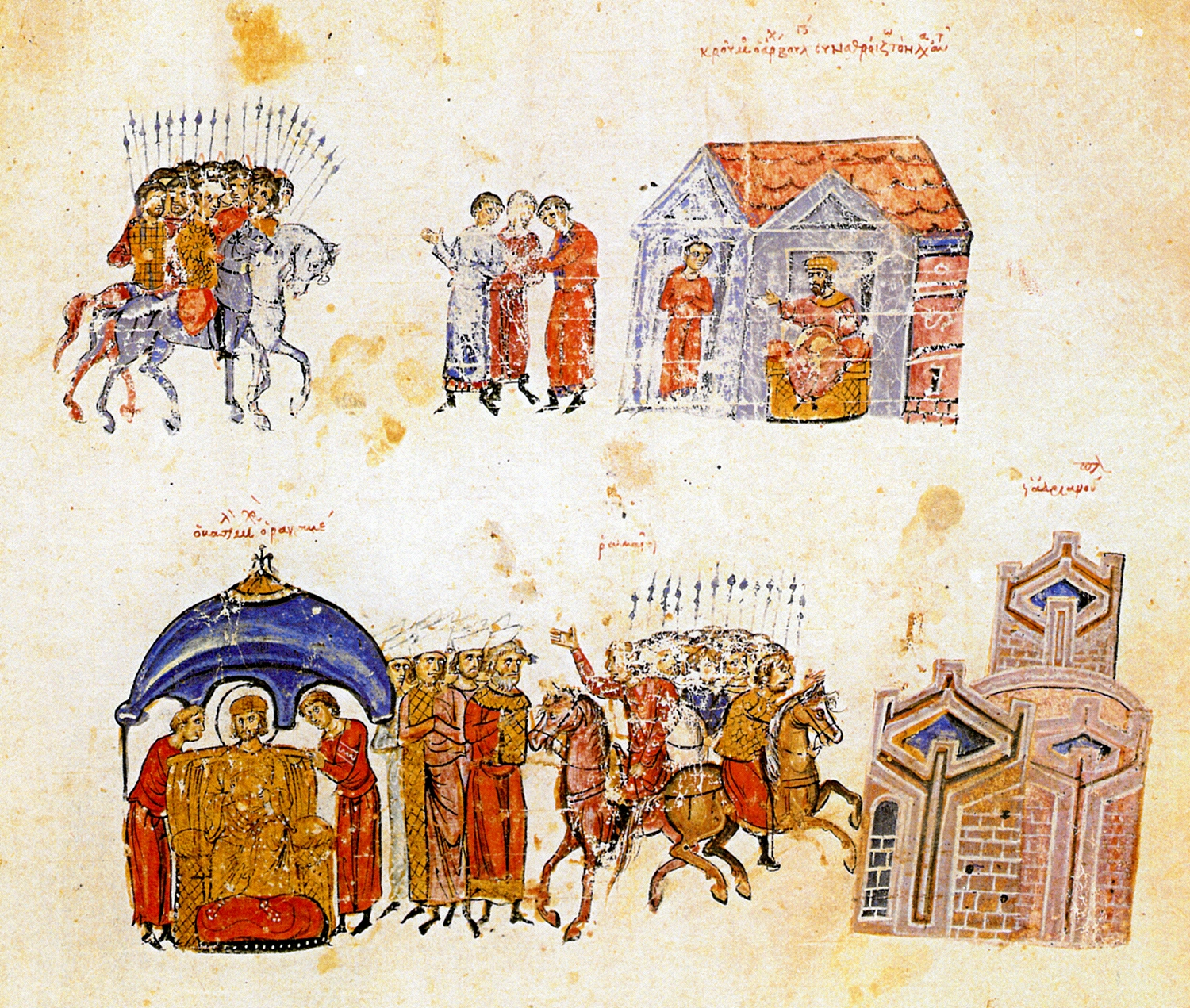
The armies of Michael I (below) and Krum (above) prepare for battle after negotiations failed.

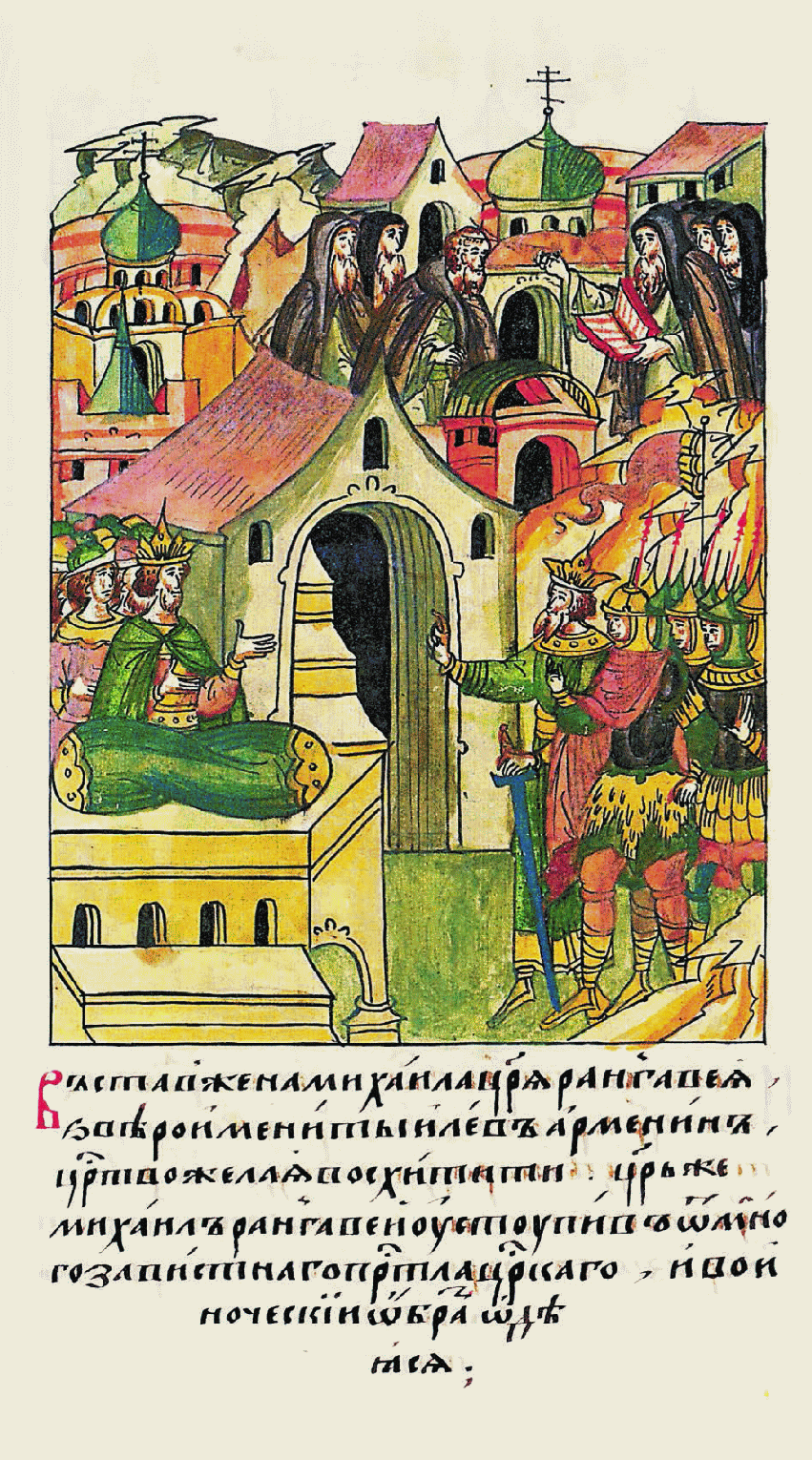
Michael I abdicates the throne to Leo V the Armenian. From the 16th century Facial Chronicle.

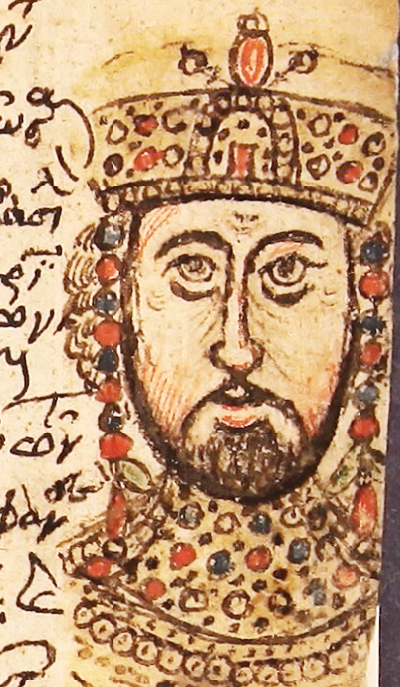
Depiction of Michael I in the 15th century Mutinensis gr. 122.

== Sources ==
=== Primary ===
- Joseph Genesius (1998) [10th century]. Genesios on the Reigns of the Emperors - Translation and Commentary. Translated by Kaldellis, Anthony. Brill.

=== Secondary ===
- Auzépy, Marie-France (2008). "State of emergency (700–850)". In Shepard, Jonathan (ed.). The Cambridge history of the Byzantine Empire (c. 500–1492). Cambridge University Press. ISBN 978-0-521-83231-1.
- Bradbury, Jim (2004). The Routledge Companion to Medieval Warfare. Routledge.
- Brubaker, Leslie; Haldon, John (2011). Byzantium in the iconoclast era, c. 680–850. Cambridge University Press. ISBN 978-0-521-43093-7.
- Bury, John Bagnell (1912). A History of the Eastern Roman Empire from the Fall of Irene to the Accession of Basil I, (802–867). Macmillan Publishers.
- Canning, Joseph (1996). A History of Medieval Political Thought: 300–1450. Routledge.
- Eichmann, Eduard (1942). Die Kaiserkrönung im Abendland - ein Beitrag zur Geistesgeschichte des Mittelalters, mit besonderer Berücksichtigung des kirchlichen Rechte, der Liturgie und der Kirchenpolitik. Echter-Verlag. p. 33.
- Luttwak, Edward N. (2009). The Grand Strategy of the Byzantine Empire. Harvard University Press.
- McCormick, Michael (2008). "Western Approaches (700–900)". In Shepard, Jonathan (ed.). The Cambridge history of the Byzantine Empire (c. 500–1492). Cambridge University Press. ISBN 978-0-521-83231-1.
- Martindale, John Robert (2001). Prosopography of the Byzantine Empire. ISBN 978-1897747322.
- Ostrogorsky, George (1986). History of the Byzantine State. Rutgers University Press.
- Treadgold, Warren (1997). A History of the Byzantine State and Society. Stanford, California: Stanford University Press. ISBN 0-8047-2630-2.
- Tsamakda, Vasiliki (2002). The Illustrated Chronicle of Ioannes Skylitzes in Madrid. Leiden: Alexandros. ISBN 978-9080647626.
- Vasiliev, Aleksandr Aleksandrovich (1958). History of the Byzantine Empire, 324–1453. University of Wisconsin Press.
- Venning, T., ed. (2006). A Chronology of the Byzantine Empire. Palgrave Macmillan.

== See also ==
- List of Byzantine emperors

Michael I Rangabe Nikephorian dynasty Born: c. 770 Died: 11 January 844
Regnal titles
Preceded by Staurakios	Byzantine emperor 2 October 811 – 11 July 813 with Theophylact and Staurakios (son of Michael I)	Succeeded by Leo V
Political offices
Preceded by Nikephoros I in 803, then lapsed	Roman consul 803	Succeeded by Lapsed, Leo V in 814
