= Staurakios =

Byzantine emperor in 811 (790s–812)

- Emperor of the Romans
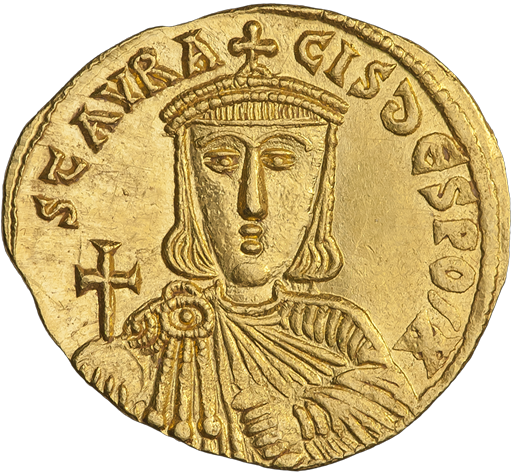
- Staurakios as co-emperor on a gold solidus

Byzantine emperor
- Reign: 26 July – 2 October 811
- Coronation: 25 December 803
- Predecessor: Nikephoros I
- Successor: Michael I
- Alongside: Nikephoros I (803 – 811)
- Born: Early 790s
- Died: 11 January 812
- Burial: Monastery of Braka
- Consort: Theophano of Athens
- Dynasty: Nikephorian
- Father: Nikephoros I

Staurakios or Stauracius (Greek: Σταυράκιος, romanized: Staurákios; early 790s – 11 January 812) was the shortest-reigning Byzantine emperor, ruling for 68 days between 26 July and 2 October 811.

He was born in the early 790s, probably between 791 and 793, to Nikephoros I and an unknown woman. Nikephoros seized the throne of the Byzantine Empire from Empress Irene in 802, and elevated Staurakios to co-emperor on 25 December 803. On 20 December 807, a bride show was held by Nikephoros to select a wife for Staurakios, which resulted in his marriage to Theophano of Athens, a kinswoman of Irene. Little else is known of him until he came to take the throne upon the death of Nikephoros.

Staurakios took part in an invasion of the Bulgarian Khanate in 811, alongside his father and brother-in-law. Although initially successful, with the Byzantines laying siege to the Bulgarian capital of Pliska and defeating a relief force, they were soon ambushed by Khan Krum, and trapped in a small valley. The Bulgarians then attacked, starting the Battle of Pliska on 26 July 811, wherein much of the Byzantine army was destroyed, and Nikephoros was slain. Carried back to Constantinople by litter, Staurakios was declared emperor despite his severe injuries from the battle, which included the severing of his spine. While this was done to maintain legitimacy in the succession, the question of his successor was hotly debated. His reign was short due to the political uncertainties surrounding his wounds; he was usurped by his brother-in-law, who acceded to the imperial throne as Michael I Rhangabe, on 2 October 811. After being removed from power, he was sent to live in a monastery, where he stayed until he died, either of gangrene or poisoned by his sister, Prokopia, on 11 January 812.

== Biography ==
=== Early life and background ===
Staurakios was born in the early 790s, probably between 791 and 793, to Nikephoros I and an unknown woman. (Note: Staurakios' mother is often referred to as Prokopia due to confusion with her daughter, Prokopia.) The historian J. B. Bury stated that he was likely younger than his sister Prokopia. Staurakios was named after his paternal grandfather. His father was likely the same Nikephoros as the one who had been strategos of the Armeniac Theme before being deposed for supporting Empress Irene (r. 797–802). He was also possibly logothetēs tou genikou (finance minister) at the time of Staurakios' birth, as he achieved this rank by 797. Nikephoros revolted against Irene on 31 October 802 AD, and seized the throne for himself, exiling Irene to a convent on the island of Principo. Treadgold comments that this was "a bloodless and relatively harmonious transfer of power", and that while Nikephoros seized the throne from Irene, he did not displace her regime, but rather usurped it for himself. Staurakios was around 10–12 years old at the time Nikephoros became emperor. At the beginning of his rule, Nikephoros had strong support from the bureaucracy, and superficially positive relations with the army and clergy.

Treadgold suggests that Nikephoros had witnessed "a good deal of financial mismanagement" before he seized power, but was unable to prevent it at that time. Indeed, one of his first acts as emperor was to seize control of a secret treasury reserve from Irene. Soon after, he took measures to increase the treasury, such as canceling tribute payments to the Abbasid Caliphate, an "exorbitant and humiliating payment", accepting the risk of war. Later, he ended the suspension of urban tariffs and estate taxes that Irene had implemented. Treadgold comments that the suspension of Irene's popular fiscal policies was bold, and risked reducing his own popularity, but that Nikephoros must have considered them too expensive to continue, and was aware that the capital was relatively undertaxed compared to the rest of the empire. He took similar efforts to tackle the issue of corruption, founding a new court where he heard complaints levied by the poor against the elites. While his supporters praised him for championing the poor, opponents declaimed him for his measures against the wealthy. Some of these opponents also alleged greed, but Treadgold comments that this likely referred to the effort Nikephoros put into collecting revenues, as the man himself was famously austere.

=== Reign as co-emperor ===
Staurakios was not given an official government position upon his father's accession to the throne, but, in the summer of 803, a general named Bardanes Tourkos revolted against Nikephoros, prompting a change of course. Originally stratēgos of the Thracesian Theme, Nikephoros had consolidated the five major themes of Asia Minor—Anatolic, Armeniac, Bucellarian, Opsikion, and Thracesian—under Bardanes' control as monostrategos of the combined area. When the Abbasid Caliphate began preparations for an attack that summer, Nikephoros was unable to take command due to an injury sustained in May, the role fell to Bardanes, who advanced his troops and began preparations. There, his troops grumbled over Nikephoros' financial policies, which included the reinstatement of the estate tax on soldiers; by comparison, Bardanes was considered to be very charitable in dividing war spoils, and thus they declared him emperor on July 19. Treadgold comments that although the rebellion theoretically commanded nearly half of the army, Bardanes seemed to lack the commitment to become emperor, and soon discussed terms with Nikephoros, who swore not to harm Bardanes or his soldiers if Bardanes would surrender and enter the monastery, which Bardanes did in early September. Although Nikephoros abided by his pledge not to harm the surrendered men, he did seize a significant amount of money and property from the leaders of the rebellion, fined four of the themes a year's worth of salary, and exiled some bishops to the remote island of Pantelleria, near Sicily. Nikephoros soon negotiated a moderate deal with the Abbasid Caliph Harun al-Rashid, including a small tribute payment.

Although his revolt was put down by early September, it convinced Nikephoros to consolidate his hold on the throne and secure the succession, by declaring Staurakios co-emperor and heir, which he did on Christmas Day of 803. Staurakios was crowned by the Ecumenical Patriarch of Constantinople Tarasios in the Hagia Sophia. By making Staurakios emperor, Nikephoros removed any question of the imperial succession and increased his own legitimacy—although Staurakios, now somewhere between the ages of 11 and 13, was not yet old enough to actually exercise power. The contemporary chronicler Theophanes the Confessor stated that Staurakios was "completely unfit in appearance, strength, and judgment for such an honor", but this is likely a reflection of Theophanes' own animosity toward Nikephoros and Staurakios. While opponents of Nikephoros decried Staurakios as sickly, Treadgold comments that any health issues he may have had did not prevent later participation in military campaigns; opponents also presented his obedience to his father as a failing.

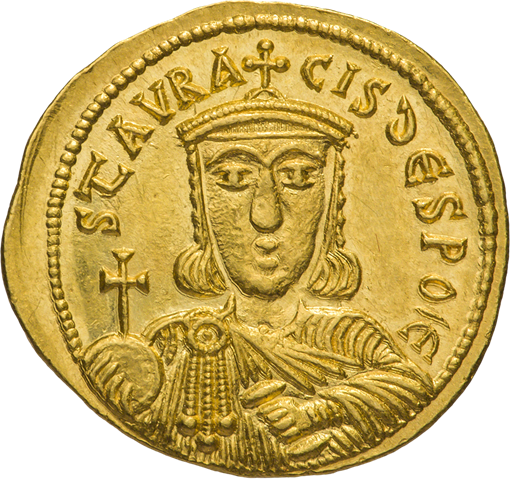
Another solidus of Staurakios as co-emperor

When Tarasios died in 806, Nikephoros selected a man named Nikephoros, who was residing in a monastery, to succeed him. For the installation ceremony of Nikephoros as patriarch, where the new patriarch was tonsured, Staurakios was sent to represent his father. That same year, the Byzantine Empire faced a massive invasion from the Abbasid Caliphate, which forced Nikephoros to accept humiliating peace terms, paying an annual tribute of 30,000 nomismata and six great gold medals, three for Nikephoros and three for Staurakios.

Except for the installation ceremony of Patriarch Nikephoros, Staurakios is not mentioned in the sources until 807, when his father arranged Staurakios' marriage, holding an imperial bride-show to select a wife on 20 December 807. This was the second recorded Byzantine bride-show, after the one held by Constantine VI (r. 780–797) by his mother, Empress Irene. During the bride show, Theophano of Athens was selected, likely due to the fact that she was a kinswoman of Irene, and therefore would help add legitimacy to both Nikephoros' and Staurakios' rule. According to Theophanes, she was chosen despite the fact that she was already engaged to a man, whom she had slept with premaritally, and was not the most beautiful of the women presented at the bride show. (Note: The Oxford Dictionary of Byzantium states that Staurakios "raped two beautiful girls", but this is a misreading of Theophanes, who asserts that Nikephoros selected the two most beautiful girls from the bride show, and engaged in open debauchery with them.) Staurakios and Theophano married that same month.

After his marriage, Staurakios is not mentioned again until 811, when Nikephoros prepared his invasion of the Bulgarian Khanate in May of that year. The Bulgarians had been a serious threat to the empire since the reign of Constantine IV (r. 668–685), who launched a calamitous attack against them. Tensions rose between 808 and 811, resulting in outright warfare. Nikephoros led the campaign over the Balkan Mountains and into the Bulgarian Khanate alongside Staurakios, who by now was in his late teens, and many senior imperial officials. The campaign saw great success at first, with the Byzantine forces attacking the Bulgarian capital of Pliska, defeating first the 12,000-strong garrison of the city, and then a relief force of 15,000 sent by Khan Krum (r. 803–814). In correspondence sent to Constantinople, Nikephoros credited his success to the strategic advice of Staurakios. The victorious Byzantine forces began to march back to the Byzantine Empire, but a desperate Krum managed to trap the Byzantine army in a small valley with palisades, before launching a massive assault two days later, on 26 July 811. The Battle of Pliska resulted in a Bulgarian massacre of the Byzantine forces. Much of the Byzantine army was destroyed, and Nikephoros himself was slain.

=== Rule as sole emperor ===
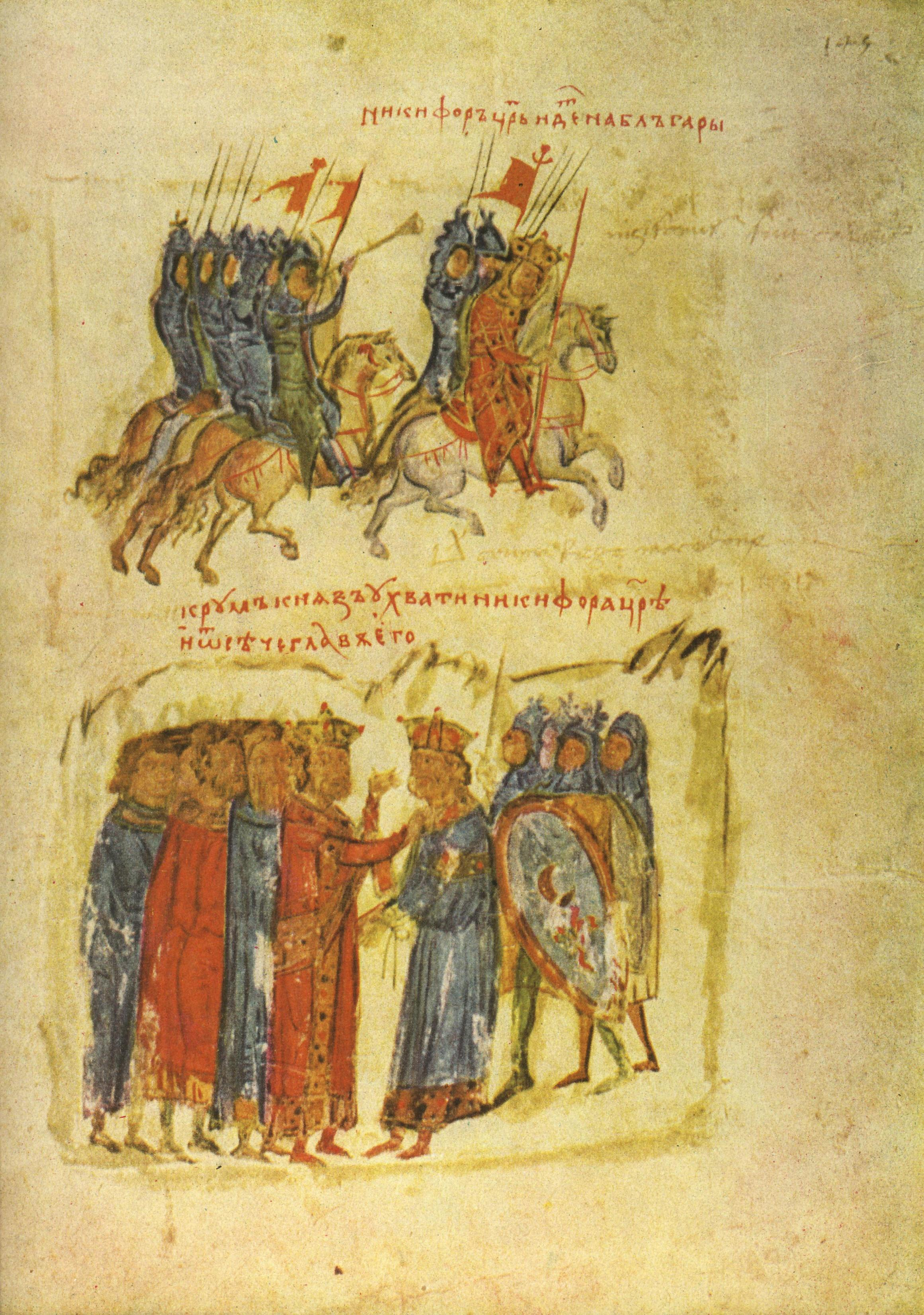
Staurakios (above) retreats with his remaining forces, while Nikephoros I (below) is captured by the Bulgarians. Miniature from the 14th century Manasses Chronicle.

The remaining Byzantine forces, including a severely wounded Staurakios, retreated to Adrianople over three days. Staurakios' spine had been severed during the battle, which along with his demonstrated lack of ability, led three influential figures in the Empire, who travelled with Nikephoros and Staurakios but were uninjured, to consider the issue of Nikephoros' successor. These were the magistros (lit. Master of Offices, by this time honorific) Theoktistos, the Domestic of the Schools, Stephanos, and Nikephoros' son-in-law, the kouropalates (high-ranking court official) Michael Rhangabe. The severity of Staurakios' wounds led to speculation as to whether he would live, although eventually those assembled judged he would make the best candidate, as the legitimate successor, and declared him emperor. The historian George Ostrogorsky comments that this was done "in strict conformity with the principle of legitimacy", and that the final settlement of the succession was to take place in Constantinople, where Staurakios would crown his successor. This was the first time a Byzantine emperor was installed outside of Constantinople, due to the urgency of the situation.

Staurakios gave a speech to the surviving troops, where he insulted Nikephoros' military judgment, before being acclaimed by the army. (Note: Bury conjectures the date was 28 July 811. Theophanes writes that Staurakios reigned for 2 months and 6 days, from Saturday July 26th to Thursday October 2nd, which fits accurately. However, Bury follows the later Theophanes Continuatus in writing that Staurakios ruled 2 months and 8 days.) The historian Christian Laes comments that it is difficult to assess the condition that Staurakios was in, and how he was able to deliver his virulent speech.

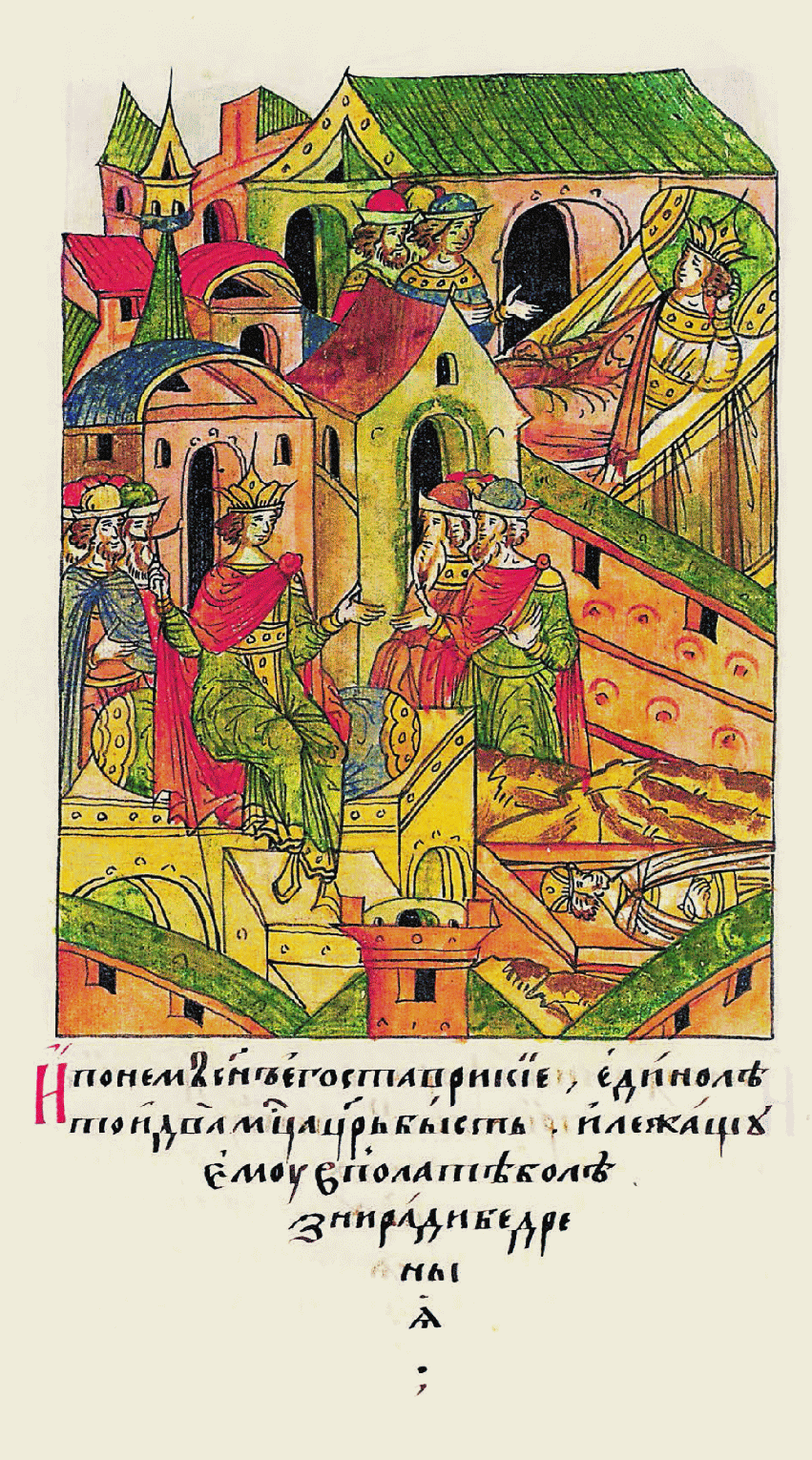
Staurakios on the throne, illustration from the 16th century Facial Chronicle.

Almost immediately after Staurakios acceded to the throne, Michael was pressured to usurp it, due to the legitimacy granted to him by his marriage to Staurakios' sister Prokopia and his military abilities. Theoktistos and others attempted to convince Michael to take the throne, although he repeatedly refused at this time, citing an oath of loyalty he had made to both Nikephoros and Staurakios, as well as his family ties to Staurakios via his marriage to Prokopia. The historians Edward Foord and George Finlay comment that the army seemed willing to stand by Staurakios, but for his mortal wounds posing a threat to the succession of the empire, and the enemies that had been made by the severe fiscal policies of Nikephoros. As Finlay argues, a change in administration implied a change of emperor, causing many who would profit from a change of ruler to support Michael.

Staurakios was brought by litter to Constantinople. By this time, it had been discovered that he had blood in his urine, and was paralyzed from the waist down. In spite of his ill health, Staurakios endeavored to assert his authority, including rebuffing the attempts of the Ecumenical Patriarch of Constantinople, Nikephoros I, to have funds that Nikephoros had collected returned to the church. Laes comments that "Possibly, a link between Staurakios’ bad condition and his father's sins was thus established" by Patriarch Nikephoros' insistence that Staurakios placate God and compensate those who his father had harmed.

The severity of his injury, and the lack of any children to nominate as heirs led to a debate about who would succeed him, as his impending death was considered a certainty. Ostrogorsky comments that an interregnum was seen as particularly undesirable due to the imminent danger from the Abbasid Caliphate and the Bulgarian Khanate, and that a return to normality was therefore essential. The delay of Staurakios in selecting a successor caused passionate dispute within the capital. Staurakios' sister Prokopia backed her husband Michael, while Empress Theophano was put forth as a candidate for the succession; she may have hoped to take the throne the same way her kinswoman Irene had. The only proof of such intrigues given by contemporary historians comes from records that Staurakios became hostile to Theoktistos and Michael, which would suggest he was aware of their plottings, and that he suspected Prokopia of conspiring to kill him. Staurakios reportedly wavered between two possible options for his succession. The first, to make Theophano empress-regnant, and the second, attested in a ninth-century chronicle, to institute a form of imperial democracy. Bury dismisses the second option as the machinations of Staurakios' addled brain, and furthermore questions the authenticity of the report. The historian Aikaterina Christophilopoulou argued that Bury's narrative of an imperial democracy stems from a misunderstanding of a passage from Theophanes. Instead, the proper reading seems to be that Staurakios feared that crowning his wife might lead to a civil war, or the empowering of the Blues and Greens. After hearing of the options Staurakios was considering, Patriarch Nikephoros began to align himself with Stephanos, Theoktistos, and Michael. Afraid of the possibility of a public uprising due to the lack of an heir, Staurakios declared Theophano his successor. This decision united the chief leaders and officials of the Byzantine Empire behind Michael, as they did not desire to return to the uncertainty which had pervaded Irene's rule, due to her ruling despite being a woman.

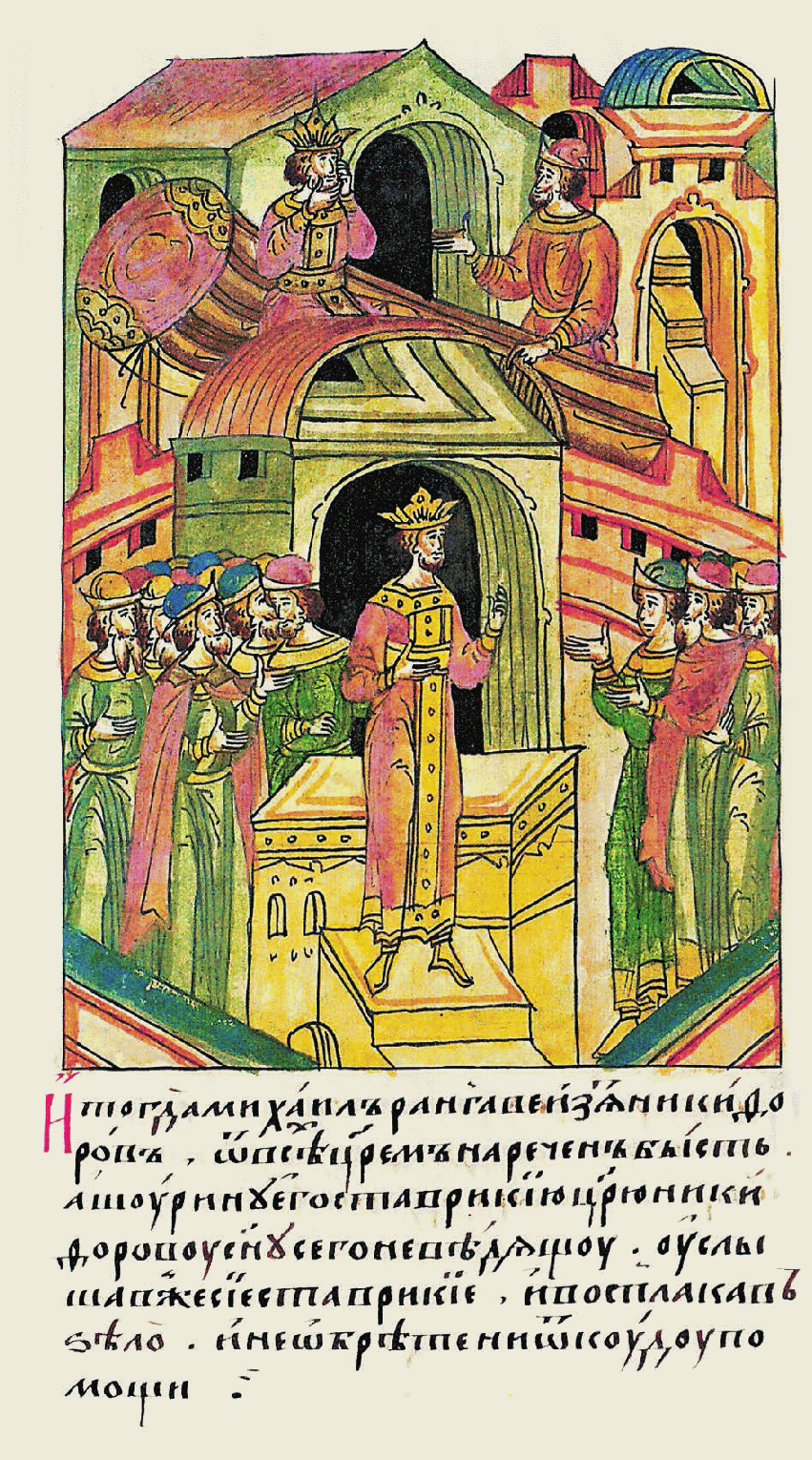
Staurakios is forced to give up the purple to Michael Rhangabe.

On 1 October 811, Staurakios summoned Stephanos, whom he trusted likely because Stephanos was the first to proclaim Staurakios emperor. He proposed blinding Michael, unaware that Stephanos supported him. Stephanos assured Staurakios of the strength of his position, and dissuaded him from having Michael blinded, claiming he was too well-protected for an attempted blinding to succeed. Stephanos, after swearing he would not reveal the discussion to anyone else, organized a coup to bring Michael to power. Stephanos gathered the remaining tagmatic forces and senate at the Great Palace of Constantinople, and declared Michael emperor. Michael first proposed that the stratēgos Leo, future emperor (r. 813–820), take the throne, but agreed to accept the crown himself when Leo promised to support him. Michael gained the full support of Patriarch Nikephoros by forging an agreement wherein he promised to uphold Orthodoxy, to not persecute Christians, or use violence against clergy or monks. At dawn on the morning of 2 October, Michael was publicly proclaimed emperor in the Hippodrome of Constantinople, and crowned a few hours later by Patriarch Nikephoros, at the pulpit of the Hagia Sophia. Upon hearing of this, Staurakios hastened to abdicate, fearing his execution otherwise; his reign was one of the shortest in Byzantine history. Staurakios summoned his relative, the monk Simeon, and was tonsured and dressed in monastic garb. Staurakios also sent a letter of protest to Patriarch Nikephoros for his role in the coup d'état; Nikephoros answered in person, writing alongside Michael and Prokopia, and assured Staurakios that he had not betrayed him, but rather protected him. Staurakios was unimpressed and informed the Patriarch that "you will not find him [Michael] a better friend", meaning that Michael would not be more useful to Nikephoros than Staurakios himself had been.

The Byzantine Empire (green) shortly after the end of the reign of Staurakios, in 814

Staurakios lived another three months before dying of gangrene on 11 January 812. He was buried in the Monastery of Braka, which was given to Theophano by Prokopia. There were allegations that he was poisoned by his sister Prokopia, rather than dying of gangrene, reported by the Syriac sources—the Chronicle of 813 and Michael the Syrian—and the chronicle of the Petros of Alexandria. Theophanes considered these rumors possible and mentions that Theophano herself considered these rumors to be true. According to the De Ceremoniis, a 10th-century book describing Byzantine courtly protocol and history written by Constantine VII, Staurakios was buried in a white marble sarcophagus that would later be shared with Theophano.

== Historiography ==
Because of the brevity of Staurakios' reign, and the shortcomings and bias of the sources, much of his life is unknown. The main source for the reigns of both Nikephoros I and Staurakios is Theophanes' Chronographia, which was tainted by Theophanes' dislike of the former, although it does hint that Staurakios possessed a talent for military strategy. Although many historians believe that both Nikephoros and Staurakios have been falsely portrayed as malevolent, few other sources exist for their reign. Most other sources take the form of short references, which provide little insight, and include many errors, especially the Syriac Chronicle of 813. While Michael the Syrian, Bar Hebraeus, Michael Psellos, and the Chronicle of 813 all record the events immediately before the death of Staurakios, the death itself, and ascribe a cause, they are generally inaccurate. Indeed, the Chronicle of 813 even mistakes the time of death of Staurakios, giving it as two months into his reign, rather than nearly six months after the battle. Petros of Alexandria, in his Brief Survey of Years, which in most areas merely gives the length of reigns for the Byzantine emperors, mentions the alleged poisoning of Staurakios by Prokopia.

== Numismatics ==
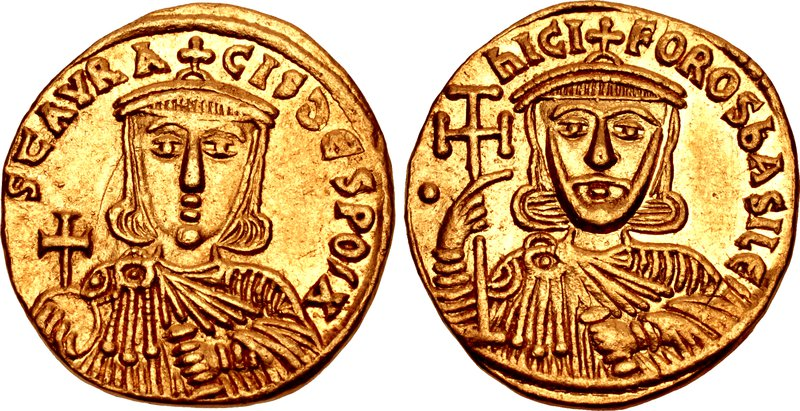
A solidus bearing the image of Staurakios (left) and Nikephoros I (right)

The solidus coins of the joint reign of Nikephoros and Staurakios are similar to those of the Isaurian dynasty, in that they show the junior emperor (Staurakios) on the reverse, and senior emperor (Nikephoros) on the obverse. On them, Staurakios is given the title of despotēs, and Nikephoros labeled as basileus. Both wear a chlamys and carry an akakia, however, Nikephoros holds in his right hand the cross potent, whereas Staurakios holds a globus cruciger. There are, oddly, no silver coins minted for the joint reign of the two. The numismatist Philip Grierson comments that one would expect miliarēsia to be struck for the coronation of Staurakios, but speculates that "the explanation is to be found in Nikephoros' penurious habits". No known coins were minted for the sole reign of Staurakios, perhaps because it was not considered worthwhile to make new coin dies for the mortally wounded emperor. Grierson makes the comment that the discovery of nomismata for Empresses Zoë Porphyrogenita (r. 1042) and Theodora Porphyrogenita (r. 1042) reveals that a reign of roughly two months might justify a mint in creating coins for the ruler, and therefore coins of Staurakios might exist, yet undiscovered; however, Grierson considers it equally likely that the dying emperor simply continued to mint the old coins, under his father's name. The numismatist Maria Vrij comments that "producing new coins in the emperor's name can hardly have been a pressing concern, since his very survival was not certain". She also stated the possibility that the absence of coins for the sole reign of Staurakios might be a result of a "dearth of archaeological material", but stated that as time passes without the discovery of such coins, the possibility becomes more remote, but is "technically possible and therefore worth acknowledging."

== Legacy ==
Staurakios largely existed in the shadow of Nikephoros; little is known about him. Staurakios only reigned for just over two months, and was therefore unable to leave a mark on the empire as his father had done. Hints from the Chronographia suggest that Staurakios wielded strategic understanding, and perhaps that Staurakios was as strong-willed as his father, but his character is otherwise unknown. For these reasons, historian Matthew Marsh comments that "he remains a brief and shadowy figure in the history of the Empire". Both Nikephoros and Staurakios were generally successful in maintaining the borders of the Byzantine Empire, although they did not achieve much military success, occasionally being forced to make humiliating concessions to powerful enemies, such as the Abbasid Caliph Harun al-Rashid.

Staurakios Nikephorian dynasty Born: After 778 Died: 11 January 812
Regnal titles
| Preceded by Nikephoros I | Byzantine Emperor; 26 July – 2 October 811 with Nikephoros I (803 – 811) | Succeeded by Michael I |
