= Nikephoros I =

Byzantine emperor from 802 to 811

- Emperor of the Romans
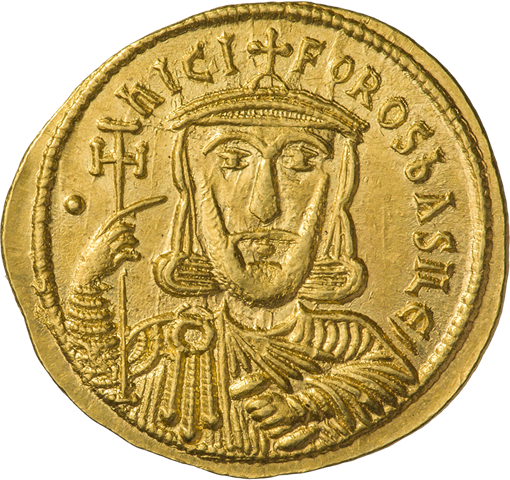
- Gold solidus of Nikephoros I, marked: niciforos basile(us)

Byzantine emperor
- Reign: 31 October 802 – 26 July 811
- Predecessor: Irene
- Successor: Staurakios
- Born: 750
- Died: 26 July 811 (aged 60–61); Battle of Pliska, Varbitsa Pass
- Spouse: Unknown
- Issue: Staurakios; Prokopia
- Dynasty: Nikephorian
- Religion: Chalcedonian Christianity

Nikephoros I (Greek: Νικηφόρος, romanized: Nikēphóros; 750 – 26 July 811), also known as Nicephorus I, was Byzantine emperor from 802 to 811. He was General Logothete (finance minister) under Empress Irene, but later overthrew her to seize the throne for himself. Prior to becoming emperor, he was sometimes referred to as "the Logothete" (Greek: ὁ Λογοθέτης, romanized: ō Logothētés) and "Genikos" or "Genicus" (Greek: ὁ Γενικός, romanized: ō Gēnikós), in recognition of his previous role as General Logothete.

During his reign, Nikephoros engaged in military campaigns against both the Arabs and the Bulgarians, although the outcomes were varied. While leading an invasion into Bulgaria, he suffered a defeat and was killed at the Battle of Pliska.

== Background ==
According to contemporary sources like Theophanes the Confessor and Patriarch Nikephoros, he was a Greek from Seleucia in Isauria and that’s what modern scholars also agree on. Other several sources outside the Byzantine context, such as Michael the Syrian, al-Tabari, and Mas'udi, claim that there is a tradition that suggests Nikephoros had Ghassanid Arab origins and that he descended from the final Ghassanid ruler Jabala ibn al-Ayham, which is unlikely as there’s no reliable contemporary source that claims so.

== Accession ==
Nikephoros was appointed finance minister (logothetēs tou genikou) by Empress Irene. He played a significant role in a power struggle among courtiers. During Irene's years as sole ruler (797–802), discontent grew due to her financial laxity. In 802, Charlemagne initiated marriage negotiations to "unite" the new Western and Eastern empires, thus resolving the problem of two emperors. Irene was happy to do so, but the proposal was frightening to some Byzantine civil and military officials, including Domestic of the Schools Niketas Triphyllios and relative of Irene Leon Sarantapechos, who began a conspiracy led by Nikephoros to overthrow Irene. While the Frankish ambassadors were still in Constantinople to negotiate the marriage, the conspiracy was set in motion. Irene was at her palace near the Harbour of Eleutherios. Nikephoros's co-conspirators falsely informed the guards that the courtier Aetios was forcing Irene to cede the throne to his brother Leo, and that opponents of the coup wished to make Nikephoros emperor instead. The guards sided with Nikephoros, and the palace was surrounded. The next day, Irene was removed and confined to the Great Palace of Constantinople. With the support of his co-conspirators, Nikephoros was then crowned emperor by Patriarch Tarasios of Constantinople in the Hagia Sophia on 31 October 802. At first Irene was banished to the nearby island of Prinkipo, but she was suspected of plotting with Aetios, and so banished to Lesbos.

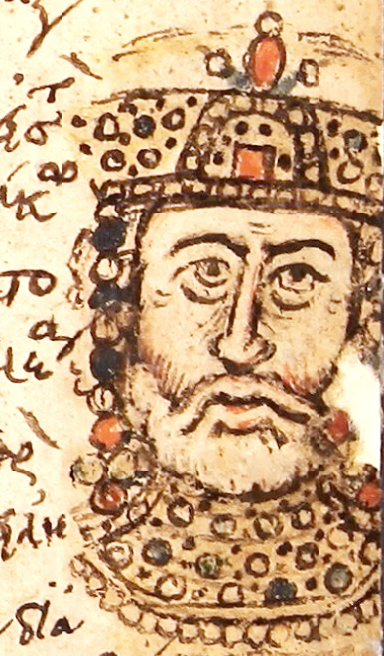
The 104th imperial portrait in Mutinensis gr. 122, depicting Nikephoros I

== Reign ==
Nikephoros undertook a comprehensive reorganisation of the Byzantine Empire and made efforts to strengthen its borders. Similarly to the Isaurian emperors, Nikephoros enacted a vigorous policy of resettlement of impoverished soldiers and peasants from the themes of Asia Minor to Thrace, Macedonia, Epirus, Thessaly and southern Greece. He expanded and consolidated the imperial military forces in various themes, managing the empire's finances with strict discipline, which led to the displeasure and hostility of his subjects. To secure political stability and succession, he crowned his son Staurakios co-emperor on Christmas Day 803.

According to later accounts by Theophanes Continuatus in the 10th century and Synopsis Chronike in the 13th century, the rebellion of General Bardanes Tourkos in 803 may have been triggered by dissatisfaction with Nikephoros's handling of army salaries. Two influential supporters of Bardanes, Generals Leo (later Emperor Leo V) and Michael (later Emperor Michael II), defected to Nikephoros, receiving major promotions as a reward. Bardanes surrendered on the condition of a pledge of safety for him and his followers but he was soon blinded and sent to a monastery. A conspiracy led by the patrician Arsaber in 808 had a similar outcome.

In 805, the Sclaveni of Patras in the Peloponnese rebelled against Nikephoros, who in response appropriated them and their property to the Archbishopric of Patras.

Upon the death of Patriarch Tarasios of Constantinople in February 806, Nikephoros appointed an iconodule layman, Nikephoros, causing the monks at the Monastery of Stoudios including Theodore the Stoudite and Plato of Sakkoudion to grow hostile towards him. Nikephoros also revived the Moechian controversy by convoking a synod in which Constantine VI's second marriage was declared lawful. Theodore persuaded his brother, Joseph, the Archbishop of Thessalonica, to refuse to celebrate the Christmas liturgy with the Patriarch and Emperor, leading to a confrontation. Nikephoros confirmed in a 809 synod that the emperor was not bound by canon law, and demoted Joseph, Theodore and Plato, banishing them to the Princes' Islands. Although the Stoudites were unsuccessful, Theodore's subsequent reputation benefited from his position and behaviour.

Nikephoros's imposition of taxes and his attempts to exert control over the church created a rift between him and the clergy. Although he appointed the iconodule Nikephoros as the patriarch, Emperor Nikephoros was portrayed unfavorably by ecclesiastical historians such as Theophanes the Confessor.

=== Italy ===
In 802, Charlemagne recognised the Republic of Venice as a Frankish fief under his third son, Pepin of Italy. Nikephoros responded by sending a fleet, but a compromise was reached in which the pro-Frankish Doge, Obelerio degli Antenori, would accept the additional title of spatharios to confirm his imperial loyalty. Nikephoros concluded a treaty known as the "Pax Nicephori" with Charlemagne, but refused to acknowledge his imperial status. Relations between the two deteriorated, leading to a war over Venice between 807 and 810 when Obelerio began to show signs of disloyalty, and a second Byzantine fleet arrived. While Nikephoros managed to suppress a rebellion in Venice in 807, he suffered significant losses to the Franks. The conflict was ultimately resolved after Nikephoros's death. Local opinion was overwhelmingly in favour of Byzantium, resulting in the assignment of Venice, Istria, the Dalmatian coast, and Southern Italy to the Eastern realm, while Rome, Ravenna, and the Pentapolis were included in the Western realm.

=== Campaigns against the Arabs and Bulgars ===
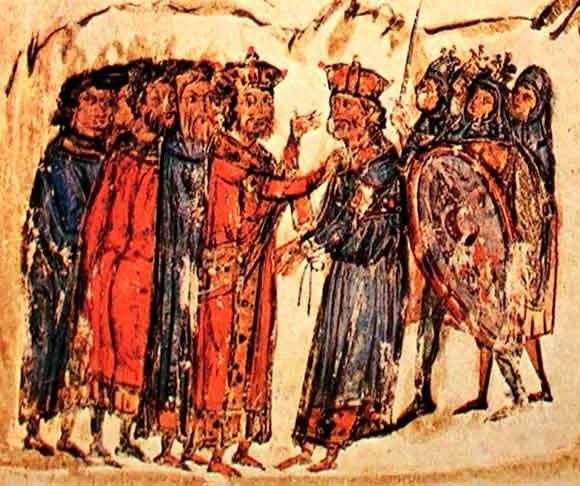
Khan Krum captures Nikephoros I, from the 14th-century Manasses Chronicle.

Shortly after Nikephoros's accession, he sent an insulting letter to Abbasid Caliph Harun al-Rashid, demanding the return of tribute which Empress Irene had paid. He withheld further tribute, and there may have been raids against Arab settlements. Nikephoros thus committed himself to a war against Harun. Due to Bardanes's disloyalty, Nikephoros was forced to lead the military campaign himself, resulting in a severe defeat at the Battle of Krasos in Phrygia in 805. Although there was an exchange of prisoners, Harun imposed a tribute of 30,000 dinars on Byzantium. In 806, a Muslim army comprising 135,000 soldiers invaded the Empire, once again led by Harun, and captured Heraclea Cybistra and Tyana. Unable to match the Muslim forces, Nikephoros agreed to peace on the condition of an immediate payment of 50,000 nomismata and an annual tribute of 30,000 nomismata. Harun had taken measures to secure the Arab-Byzantine frontier including the construction of new fortified districts (al-Awasim) in order to more effectively gain control of Asia Minor. However, with the Caliphate embroiled in a succession struggle following Harun al-Rashid's death in 809, Nikephoros was able to focus on dealing with Krum, the Khan of Bulgaria, who was posing a threat to the empire's northern frontiers and had recently conquered Serdica (now Sofia).

Irene abolished several economic policies enacted by the Isaurians to sustain the Byzantine military, including the taxing of soldiers' widows to compensate for the loss of a fully-equipped soldier, if their household were to continue receiving a pension and tax exemptions. Thus, there was a manpower shortage by 809/810 which forced Nikephoros to decree that rural peasants be enlisted and equipped at the expense of their fellow villagers—a policy which drew harsh criticism from Theophanes the Confessor who numbered it among Nikephoros's "vexations". In 809, near the river Struma, the Bulgars captured the wagon of the rogai (cash remuneration for the Byzantine military), which contained 79,200 nomismata. In 811, the Arabs captured the rogai of the Armeniac Theme which totalled to 93,600 nomismata. The payment of rogai was vital for the military and so the wagon was a key target for enemy capture.

In 811, Nikephoros launched an invasion of Bulgaria and was initially successful against Khan Krum and his armies, and sacked the Bulgarian capital, Pliska. The Chronicle of Michael the Syrian, a 12th-century patriarch of the Syrian Jacobites, describes the brutality and atrocities committed by Nikephoros: "Now Nicephorus went with a large force against the Bulghars. He reached the capital city of their kingdom and caused great destruction, to the point that he threw their little children on the ground and mercilessly drove over them with his threshing wagons." As Nikephoros's forces were returning to Byzantium, the imperial army was ambushed and annihilated in the Varbitsa Pass at the Battle of Pliska by Krum. Nikephoros perished in the battle, and Krum is said to have had his head severed and used his skull as a drinking cup. The defeat was disastrous for Byzantine morale and for the political stability of the Empire.

== Assessment and legacy ==
The reigns of the iconoclast emperors Leo III the Isaurian (r. 717–741) and Constantine V (r. 741–775) were militarily successful and saw the abatement of the Arab and Bulgar threat. According to the iconodule Patriarch Nikephoros I of Constantinople, Isaurian propaganda ascribed both their military successes and longevity to their iconoclasm. The validity of iconoclasm was only confirmed by the military disasters under the iconodule emperors Nikephoros I and Michael I Rhangabe (r. 811–813) as well as the success of the iconoclast Leo V the Armenian (r. 813–820) against the Bulgars.

== Family ==
By an unknown wife Nikephoros I had at least two children:

- Staurakios, who succeeded as emperor.
- Prokopia, who married Michael I Rhangabe, emperor 811–813.

== See also ==
- List of Byzantine emperors

== Sources ==
- Alexander, Paul Julius (1985). The Byzantine Apocalyptic Tradition. University of California Press. ISBN 978-0520049987.
- Auzépy, Marie-France (2008). "State of emergency (700–850)". In Shepard, Jonathan (ed.). The Cambridge history of the Byzantine Empire (c. 500–1492). Cambridge University Press. ISBN 978-0-521-83231-1.
- Sources of the Armenian Tradition (2013). "The Chronicle of Michael the Great, Patriarch of the Syrians". Internet Archive. Translated by Bedrosian, Robert. pp. 148–149.
- Bekkum, Wout Jac van; Drijvers, Jan Willem; Klugkist, Alexander Cornelis (2007). Syriac Polemics: Studies in Honour of Gerrit Jan Reinink. Peeters Publishers. ISBN 978-9042919730.
- Biliarsky, Ivan (2013). The Tale of the Prophet Isaiah: The Destiny and Meanings of an Apocryphal Text. Brill. ISBN 978-9004254381.
- Brown, Thomas S. (2008). "Byzantine Italy (680–876)". In Shepard, Jonathan (ed.). The Cambridge history of the Byzantine Empire (c. 500–1492). Cambridge University Press. ISBN 978-0-521-83231-1.
- Brubaker, Leslie; Haldon, John (2011). Byzantium in the iconoclast era, c. 680–850. Cambridge University Press. ISBN 978-0-521-43093-7.
- Cooper, Eric; Decker, Michael J. (2012). Life and Society in Byzantine Cappadocia. Springer. p. 42. ISBN 978-1137029645.
- El-Cheikh, Nadia Maria (2004). Byzantium Viewed by the Arabs. Harvard CMES. pp. 95, 132 n. 40. ISBN 978-0-932885-30-2.
- Garland, Lynda (1999), "Irene (769–802)", Byzantine Empresses: Women and Power in Byzantium, AD 527–1204, Routledge, pp. 73–94, ISBN 978-0-415-14688-3
- Kaegi, Walter E. (1981). Byzantine Military Unrest, 471–843: An Interpretation. Amsterdam: Adolf M. Hakkert. ISBN 90-256-0902-3.
- Kaegi, Walter E. (2008). "Confronting Islam (641–c. 850)". In Shepard, Jonathan (ed.). The Cambridge history of the Byzantine Empire (c. 500–1492). Cambridge University Press. ISBN 978-0-521-83231-1.
- Mikaberidze, Alexander, ed. (2011). Conflict and Conquest in the Islamic World: A Historical Encyclopedia. Vol. 1. ABC-CLIO.
- The Oxford Dictionary of Byzantium, ed. by Alexander Kazhdan, Oxford University Press, 1991.
- Chisholm, Hugh, ed. (1911). "Nicephorus s.v. Nicephorus I." . Encyclopædia Britannica. Vol. 19 (11th ed.). Cambridge University Press. pp. 647–648.
- Norwich, John J. (1991). Byzantium: The Apogee. Alfred A. Knopf, Inc. ISBN 0-394-53779-3.
- Vasiliev, A. A. (1964). History of the Byzantine Empire, 324-1453, Volume 1. University of Wisconsin Press. pp. 255–256.

Nikephoros I Nikephorian dynasty Born: 8th century Died: 26 July 811
Regnal titles
Preceded by Irene	Byzantine emperor 802–811	Succeeded by Staurakios
Political offices
Vacant Title last held by Constantine VI	Roman consul 803	Vacant Title next held by Leo V
