= Joseph the Confessor =

Archbishop of Thessalonica (d. 832)

Saint Joseph the Confessor

Confessor, Archbishop of Thessalonica
- Died: 832; Constantinople, Byzantine Empire (modern-day Istanbul, Turkey)
- Venerated in: Eastern Orthodox Church
- Feast: 14 July

Joseph the Confessor (d. Constantinople, 832) was a 9th-century Archbishop of Thessalonica and brother of Theodore Stoudites. He is commemorated as a saint on 14 July by the Eastern Orthodox Church.

== Life ==
Joseph was a son of Photios or Photeinos, an important financial official in the palace bureaucracy, and Theoktiste, herself the offspring of a distinguished Constantinopolitan family. The brother of Theoktiste, Joseph's uncle Plato, was an important official in the imperial financial administration. The family therefore controlled a significant portion, if not all, of the imperial financial administration during the reign of Constantine V (r. 741–775). Joseph had one older brother and one younger brother (Theodore the Studite and Euthymios) and one sister, whose name we do not know. Together with his brother Theodore Stoudites, Joseph pursued a life of asceticism under the guidance of Plato of Sakkoudion in the latter's monastery at Sakkoudion, Bithynia. Later Joseph was unanimously elected archbishop of the city of Thessalonica. Together with his brother he spoke out against the illegal marriage of Emperor Constantine VI (the "Moechian Controversy"), for which, after the torment, his brother was imprisoned in a dungeon on a deserted island.

Emperor Michael I Rangabe liberated Joseph from prison. Under Emperor Leo V the Armenian, when the second period of the Byzantine Iconoclasm began, the bishop and his brother were again punished for venerating the holy icons. In prison he was tortured, but the prelate was unshakable in his faith. The emperor demanded that he subscribe to the iconoclastic confession of faith. For his refusal the saint was thrown into another, foul dungeon.

Under Emperor Michael II, Joseph, along with other monks who had been persecuted for the veneration of icons, were liberated.

He spent his last years in the Stoudion monastery, where he retired in 830.

Joseph is known as a spiritual songwriter. He composed the triodia and stichera of the Lenten Triodion, a canon for the Sunday of the Prodigal Son's Week and other hymns. He wrote several sermons for feastdays, of which the best known is the Sermon on the Exaltation of the Precious and Life-Giving Cross of the Lord ("Λόγος είς τόν τίμιον καί ζωοποιόν Σταυρόν").

== Literature ==
- Joseph the Confessor // Encyclopedic Dictionary of Brockhaus and Efron : 86 t. (82 t. And 4 ext.). - St. Petersburg, 1890-1907.
- Orthodox Church of America - St. Joseph the Bishop of Thessalonica, and brother of St. Theodore of Studion
- Pratsch, Thomas (1998). Theodoros Studites (759-826) — zwischen Dogma und Pragma: der Abt des Studiosklosters in Konstantinopel im Spannungsfeld von Patriarch, Kaiser und eigenem Anspruch (in German). Bern: Peter Lang. ISBN 9783631338773.
