= Constantine (son of Leo V) =

Byzantine emperor from 813 to 820

- Emperor of the Romans
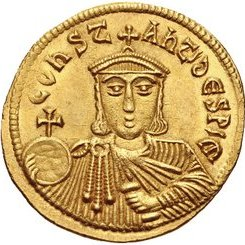
- Gold solidus with of Symbatios Constantine, marked: constant(inos) desp(ot)e(s) (Note: The honorific despotes, which appears on several coins of 9th-century co-emperors, was still not a formal title. Co-emperors have also been addressed as basileus, the main title of the emperor, and senior emperors have also been addressed as despotes.)

Byzantine co-emperor
- Reign: 25 December 813 – 25 December 820
Names
- Symbatios Konstantinos
- Father: Leo V the Armenian
- Mother: Theodosia

Symbatios (Greek: Συμβάτιος, romanized: Symbátios, from the Armenian Սմբատ), variously also Sabbatios (Σαββάτιος; Sabbátios) or Sambates (Σαμβάτης; Sambatēs) in some sources, was the eldest son of the Byzantine emperor Leo V the Armenian (r. 813–820). Soon after the coronation of his father, he was crowned co-emperor and renamed Constantine (Κωνσταντῖνος, Kōnstantînos). He reigned nominally along with his father until the latter's assassination in 820, after which he was exiled to Prote, one of the Princes' Islands, as a monk.

== Biography ==
Symbatios was the eldest son of the emperor Leo V the Armenian (r. 813–820) and his wife, Theodosia. His father was an Armenian commander in Byzantine service, possibly descended from the Gnuni family. He had risen to high command as a protégé of Bardanes Tourkos, but deserted him when the latter rebelled against Nikephoros I (r. 802–811). His mother was also of Armenian origin, the daughter of the patrikios Arsaber who attempted an unsuccessful usurpation against Nikephoros I in 808. As he was a child at the time of his father's accession to the throne, Symbatios was born sometime between 800 and 810. Michael I Rhangabes (r. 811–813), the son-in-law and successor of Nikephoros I, was likely the boy's godfather.

At the head of a military revolt following the disastrous Battle of Versinikia against the Bulgars, Leo deposed Michael I on 11 July 813 and was crowned emperor on the next day. Some time after (Note: The sources do not provide an exact date on the coronation of Symbatios. The Scriptor Incertus simply mentions that "when the feast days arrived he crowned his son, still young, and named Symbates he lied calling him Constantine" (φθασάντων τῶν ἑορτῶν ἔστεψεν τὸν υἱὸν αὐτοῦ μικρὸν ὄντα, καὶ ἐπονομαζόμενον Συμβάτην ἐψεύσατο λέγων ὅτι Κωνσταντῖνος καλεῖται). This event is mentioned along with the Bulgar raids into Thrace during the winter of 813/814. As a result, scholars like J. B. Bury, Robert Browning, and Warren Treadgold placed the coronation during Christmas 813, but the Prosopography of the Byzantine Empire places it on 16 April 814, during Easter.) he had Symbatios crowned co-emperor and renamed Constantine. The latter name was not chosen randomly: aside from it being a traditional Byzantine imperial name dating back to Constantine the Great, the assembled troops now publicly acclaimed the emperors "Leo and Constantine", evoking openly the iconoclast emperor Leo III the Isaurian (r. 717–741) and his son Constantine V (r. 741–775).

Although prior to his accession Leo had given written guarantees to the iconophile patriarch Nikephoros I that he would not attempt to overthrow iconophile church doctrine, the naming of the new co-emperor was a clear statement of intent to the contrary. Leo's motivations can only be guessed at, but at a time when the environs of Constantinople itself were being raided by the Bulgar ruler Krum, the military successes achieved by the iconoclast emperors contrasted starkly with the defeats suffered by the recent iconophile regimes. Leo was also a military man, and the memory of the iconoclast emperors was particularly cherished by the army, where many still adhered to iconoclasm.

On 14 March 814, Leo forced the resignation of Patriarch Nikephoros I, and appointed the pro-iconoclast Theodotos Melissenos, the son of one of Constantine V's brothers-in-law, in his place. The new patriarch convened a Church council in Constantinople, which overturned the Second Council of Nicaea and reinstated the ban on the veneration of icons. The council was presided over by Theodotos, while Constantine attended it as his father's representative. In 819/820, he issued, jointly with his father, a novel on marriage law.

Leo the Armenian was assassinated on 25 December 820 by the supporters of Michael the Amorian, who had been imprisoned for conspiring against Leo. Michael was released from prison and proclaimed emperor on the same night. The new emperor banished Constantine, along with his mother and three brothers, Basil, Gregory, and Theodosios, to the island of Prote, one of the Princes' Islands in the Sea of Marmara. There, the four brothers were castrated to make them incapable of future claims for the throne, and tonsured. As monks there they would live out their lives that that of their servants on the allowance from their confiscated estates granted by Michael the Amorian. Basil and Gregory continued as iconophiles as late as 847, but nothing further is known of Constantine.

== Sources ==
- Browning, Robert (1965). "Notes on the "Scriptor Incertus de Leone Armenio"". Byzantion (in French). 35: 389–411.
- Bury, John Bagnell (1912), A History of the Eastern Roman Empire from the Fall of Irene to the Accession of Basil I (A.D. 802–867), London: Macmillan and Co.
- Grierson, Philip (1973). Catalogue of the Byzantine coins in the Dumbarton Oaks Collection and in the Whittemore Collection. Dumbarton Oaks. ISBN 978-0-88402-045-5.
- Martindale, John; et al. (2015) [2001]. Prosopography of the Byzantine Empire (641-867).
- Treadgold, Warren (1988). The Byzantine Revival, 780–842. Stanford, California: Stanford University Press. ISBN 978-0-8047-1462-4.
- Lilie, Ralph-Johannes; Ludwig, Claudia; Pratsch, Thomas; Zielke, Beate (2013). Prosopographie der mittelbyzantinischen Zeit Online. Berlin-Brandenburgische Akademie der Wissenschaften. Nach Vorarbeiten F. Winkelmanns erstellt (in German). Berlin and Boston: De Gruyter.
