= Theodosia (wife of Leo V) =

Byzantine empress, wife of Leo V (c. 755-820)

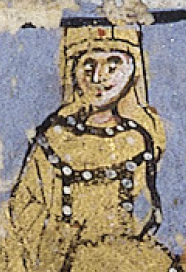
- Theodosia in the Madrid Skylitzes

Byzantine empress
- Tenure: 813–820
- Born: c. 775
- Died: after 826
- Spouse: Leo V the Armenian
- Issue Detail: Symbatios-Constantine; Basil; Gregory; Theodosios; Anna
- Father: Arsaber

Theodosia (Greek: Θεοδοσία, romanized: Theodosia; c. 775 – after 826) was the empress consort of Leo V the Armenian. Theodosia was the daughter of Arsaber, a Byzantine patrician. The name and rank of her father were recorded by both Genesius and Theophanes Continuatus, the continuer to the chronicle of Theophanes the Confessor. The name of her mother is unknown.

== Family ==
Arsaber led a failed revolt against Nikephoros I in 808. According to George Finlay: "In the year 808, however, a conspiracy was really formed to place Arsaber a patrician, who held the office of questor, or minister of legislation, on the throne. Though Arsaber was of an Armenian family, many persons of rank were leagued with him; yet Nicephorus only confiscated his estates, and compelled him to embrace the monastic life."

The name of her father indicates Armenian origins. However the names of his ancestors are not known. Genealogical theories suggest Kamsarakan ancestry.

== Marriage ==
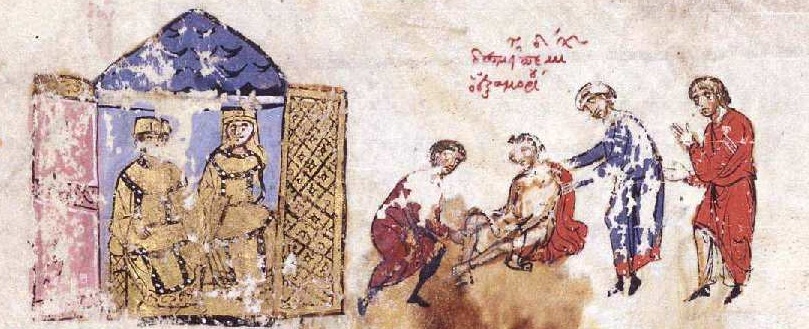
"Michael the Stammerer is chained before Leo V and Empress Theodosia" (Madrid Skylitzes, 12th century)

Theodosia married Leo V the Armenian, a strategos who had played a decisive role in Emperor Nikephoros I's defeat of the rebel Bardanes Tourkos. Leo managed to rise to the throne upon the abdication of Michael I Rangabe in 813.

Theodosia is the only wife of Leo mentioned by primary sources. However an interpretation of the text of Theophanes Continuatus has Leo marrying a daughter of Bardanes Tourkos. An interpretation which would make Leo a brother-in-law of Thekla, first wife of Michael II. Warren Treadgold for example uses this theory in The Byzantine Revival 780–842 (1988).

Genesius records that Prokopia, wife of Michael I, referred to her successor Empress as "Barca". Treatgold has suggested this was the actual name of a first wife of Leo, which would mean Theodosia married Leo once he was already emperor. However the word is also the Greek word for "boat", suggesting it was only a derisive nickname for Theodosia.

Whatever her status as wife was, Theodosia was the Empress when Leo V was assassinated on Christmas, 820. Michael II rose to the throne and exiled Theodosia and the sons of Leo V to the island of Proti. Joannes Zonaras records that they were not forced to take monastic vows. Instead they were allowed to inherit part of the personal property of Leo V and the associated revenue. They were also able to have their own attendants. Theodore the Studite sent a letter to the deposed Empress sometime between 821 and his own death in 826.

== Children ==
All known children of Leo V are traditionally attributed to Theodosia as well. Genesius records four sons:

- Symbatios (Συμβάτιος), renamed Constantine, co-emperor from 814 to 820. Castrated and exiled following the assassination of his father.
- Basil. Castrated and exiled following the assassination of his father. Still alive in 847, recorded to have supported the election of Patriarch Ignatius of Constantinople.
- Gregory. Castrated and exiled following the assassination of his father. Still alive in 847 alongside Basil.
- Theodosios (died in 820). Castrated and exiled following the assassination of his father. Died soon after his castration.

The existence of a daughter has been debated by historians and genealogists. The tentative name "Anna" has been suggested (see above). She married Hmayeak, a Mamikonian prince (died c. 797), by whom she had Konstantinos, an officer at the court of Emperor Michael III.

== Possible descendants ==
Nicholas Adontz in his book The age and origins of the emperor Basil I (1933) expressed a theory that Leo V and Theodosia were ancestors of Basil I. The theory was partly based on the account of his ancestry given by Constantine VII, a grandson of Basil I. Also the accounts given by Theophanes Continuatus.

Basil I, according to this accounts, was a son of peasants. His mother is named by Constantine VII as "Pankalo". The name of his father was not recorded. The names Symbatios and Constantine have been suggested. Both were names used by the eldest sons of Basil. With eldest sons of Byzantines typically named after their grandfathers.

The paternal grandfather of Basil is named as Maiactes. The paternal grandmother was not named but was identified as a daughter of "Leo", a citizen of Constantinople. Adontz identified this Leo as Leo V. Which would make Leo V and Theodosia great-grandparents of Basil I.

Adontz also suggested Constantine VII had made a mistake in the generations separating Maiactes and Basil. Suggesting Basil was a great-grandson of Maiactes and not old enough to have seen the wars with Krum of Bulgaria. Making Leo V and Theodosia actually fourth-generation ancestors of Basil.

The theory has been accepted by several genealogists, including Christian Settipani in his search for descent from antiquity. The name "Anna" has been suggested for the daughter of Leo V and Theodosia, because it was given to daughters of Basil I, Leo VI the Wise, Constantine VII and Romanos II. Almost every emperor that would claim descent from this woman.

== Sources ==
- Nicholas Adontz, The age and origins of the emperor Basil I (1933) .
- Warren Treadgold, The Byzantine Revival 780–842 (1988).

Royal titles
Preceded by Prokopia	Byzantine Empress consort 813–820	Succeeded by Thekla
Preceded by Prokopia	Empress-Mother of the Byzantine Empire; 813–820	Succeeded by Maria of Amnia; Titled Dowager Empress-Mother.
