= Bardanes Tourkos =

Byzantine general of Turkish origin

Bardanes
- Military career
- Allegiance: Byzantine Empire
- Rank: Domestic of the Schools, strategos of the Thracesians and the Anatolics, monostrategos of the Anatolian themes

Bardanes, nicknamed Tourkos, "the Turk" (Greek: Βαρδάνης ὁ Τοῦρκος, romanized: Varthanis o Tourkos, fl. 795–803), was a Byzantine general who launched an unsuccessful rebellion against Emperor Nikephoros I (r. 802–811) in 803. Although a major supporter of Byzantine empress Irene of Athens (r. 797–802), soon after her overthrow he was appointed by Nikephoros as commander-in-chief of the Anatolian armies. From this position, he launched a revolt in July 803, probably in opposition to Nikephoros's economic and religious policies. His troops marched towards Constantinople, but failed to win popular support. At this point, some of his major supporters deserted him and, reluctant to engage the loyalist forces in battle, Bardanes gave up and chose to surrender himself. He retired as a monk to a monastery he had founded. There he was blinded, possibly on Nikephoros's orders. He was of Turkic origin.

== Origin and early career ==
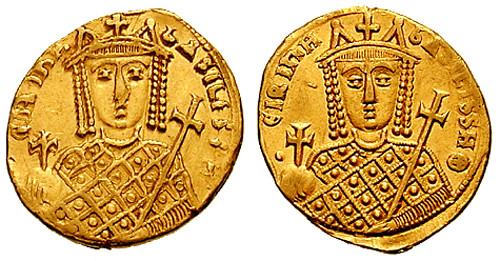
Gold solidus of Empress Irene, during the period of her sole rule (797–802).

Nothing is known of the early life of Bardanes, and his origin is disputed. On account of his first name—a Hellenized form of the common Armenian name Vardan—some scholars consider him to have been of Armenian origin, whilst his sobriquet Tourkos, could suggest a Khazar origin. The Byzantinist Warren Treadgold, judging from both his name and epithet, speculates that he may have been of mixed Armenian and Khazar blood, an opinion shared by the historian Jean-Claude Cheynet. Cheynet suggests that the Khazar parentage belonged to a member of the entourage of Empress Irene of Khazaria, the wife of Emperor Constantine V (r. 741–775), and hence a certain proximity of Bardanes to the imperial court.

Bardanes is probably identical with the patrikios Bardanios who appears in the Chronicle of Theophanes the Confessor in the mid-790s. In 795, he was Domestic of the Schools (commander of the Scholai guard regiment), and was dispatched to arrest the monk Plato of Sakkoudion for his public opposition to the second marriage of Emperor Constantine VI (r. 780–797) to Plato's niece Theodote. In 797, as strategos (military governor) of the Thracesian Theme, this same Bardanios supported the Empress-mother Irene of Athens when she usurped the throne from her son. On Easter Monday, 1 April 799, he is recorded as one of the four patrikioi (along with Niketas Triphyllios, Sisinnios Triphyllios and Constantine Boilas) who led the horses of the Empress's carriage on a unique triumphal procession from the palace to the Church of the Holy Apostles.

Irene herself was overthrown and exiled by the logothetes tou genikou (finance minister) Nikephoros on 31 October 802. At the time, Bardanes was still patrikios and strategos of the Thracesians, but was soon transferred to command the powerful Anatolic Theme. In the next year, probably in preparation for a campaign against the Arabs following Nikephoros' refusal to continue the annual payment of tribute to the Abbasid Caliphate, the emperor apparently appointed Bardanes to the post of monostrategos (lit. 'single-general', in effect commander-in-chief) of the Empire's five Anatolian land themes, a position only conferred in exceptional cases. However, this appointment is by no means certain; he is mentioned as monostrategos only by later sources, while near-contemporary ones mention him only as strategos of the Anatolics. It is possible that later sources misinterpreted his title to mean "general of all the East" (Anatole in Greek).

== Revolt ==
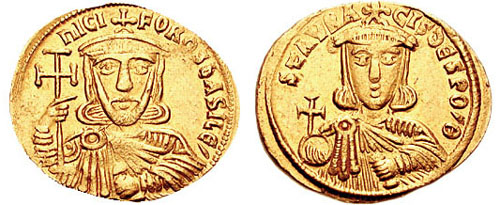
Gold solidus of Nikephoros I and his son and co-emperor, Staurakios.

In July 803, an Abbasid army under al-Qasim, a son of Caliph Harun al-Rashid (r. 786–809), began advancing towards the Byzantine frontier. As Nikephoros had broken his foot in early May, it fell to Bardanes to lead the Byzantine army against the Arabs. He therefore ordered the thematic armies of Anatolia assembled in the Anatolic Theme. On 19 July, (Note: The Oxford Dictionary of Byzantium indicates that Bardanes was proclaimed on 18 July. However, Theophanes states that the proclamation took place on a Wednesday, which would be 19 July.) Bardanes was proclaimed emperor by the assembled troops of the Anatolic, Opsician, Thracesian and Bucellarian themes. Crucially, the Armeniac Theme, either because of its traditional rivalry with the Anatolics, or because it had not yet joined up with the rest of the army, did not join the uprising. It has also been hypothesized that Bardanes may have participated in the suppression of the Armeniacs' revolt in 793, leaving lingering hostility towards him amongst its troops. Among the Byzantine chronicles that report on Bardanes's revolt, the 10th-century Theophanes Continuatus and the 13th-century Synopsis Chronike indicate that the troops were motivated chiefly by economic concerns. Nikephoros had initiated a strict budgetary policy to shore up the Empire's finances. The Emperor had revoked the exemption on inheritance tax for the soldiers, and had apparently left them unpaid for some time as well. Bardanes, on the other hand, had a good reputation in this regard, fairly dividing the booty won from the campaigns against the Arabs amongst the soldiers.

For the motives of Bardanes himself, the situation is less clear. According to the Byzantine chroniclers, he accepted the acclamation only reluctantly, after vainly entreating the soldiers to allow him to leave. According to another story however, before his revolt, Bardanes, accompanied by his three principal associates, Thomas the Slav, Leo the Armenian and Michael the Amorian visited a holy man at Philomelion to learn of the prospects for the uprising. The monk correctly prophesied that his rebellion would fail, that Thomas too would begin a revolt, and that Leo and Michael would reign as emperors. Although possibly a later invention, this story may suggest that Bardanes planned his revolt beforehand. Aside from any personal ambition, Bardanes was also a member of the landed aristocracy and a devoted iconophile who supported Empress Irene's regime. He has therefore also been seen as the representative of the opposition by the traditional elites to Nikephoros's policies, both in the confessional area, where the Emperor maintained a carefully neutral stance towards both iconoclasts and iconophiles, and in the socio-financial sphere, where new taxes on landed property and the expropriation of ecclesiastical estates hurt their interests. Treadgold further suggested that the revolt was a reaction against Nikephoros' usurpation and aimed, at least ostensibly, at the restoration of Irene. However, her death at Lesbos on 8 August deprived the rebels of any claim to legitimacy.

Byzantine Asia Minor and the Byzantine-Arab frontier region at the time of Thomas's revolt

The revolt probably took place at Amorion, the capital of the Anatolic Theme. From there, the rebel army, comprising almost half of the Empire's available military forces, marched north and west, following the military road to Nicomedia and then to Chrysopolis, the town that lay across the Bosporus from the imperial capital, Constantinople. There, Bardanes encamped for eight days, awaiting a possible uprising against Nikephoros inside the capital in response to his own rebellion. Since this did not materialize, and the populace proved not overtly enthusiastic, he withdrew to the great army base at Malagina. There, two of his associates, Michael the Amorian and Leo the Armenian, abandoned him, and were richly rewarded by Nikephoros for their defection: Michael became Count of the Tent to the Emperor, and Leo was appointed commander of the Foederati regiment.

This desertion further discouraged Bardanes, and, reluctant to face the loyalist army in battle, he opted for a negotiated surrender through the mediation of Joseph, the hegumenos (abbot) of the Kathara monastery who had officiated at Constantine VI's second marriage. Bardanes received a letter signed by the Patriarch Tarasios and several leading senators which guaranteed that neither he nor his subordinates would be punished if they surrendered. As a further guarantee of good faith, Nikephoros sent his own gold cross along with the letter. Satisfied by these assurances, on 8 September Bardanes left his army and, through Nicaea, sought refuge in the monastery of Herakleios at Cius. From there, he embarked on a ship that took him to the island of Prote. Taking the monastic name Sabbas, Bardanes then entered a monastery that he had founded there in the past.

== Aftermath of the revolt ==
After Bardanes' retirement, Nikephoros formally dismissed him and confiscated much of his property. The other thematic generals who took part in the revolt were also dismissed from their posts, the metropolitan bishops of Sardis, Amorion and Nicomedia were punished for their support of the uprising by exile to the small island of Pantelleria off Sicily, while the soldiers of the Anatolian armies were left unpaid for a year.

In December 803 (Treadgold puts it in 804), however, a group of "Lycaonian" soldiers disembarked at Prote and blinded Bardanes. This was a highly symbolic act: blinding was the usual punishment usually meted out to heretics and rebels, or to deposed emperors and other political rivals to prevent them from becoming a threat. It is very likely that this was done at the behest of the Emperor himself, although in a later public statement before the Senate, Nikephoros swore that he had nothing to do with it. Most scholars believe in Nikephoros' direct involvement, but Treadgold holds it likelier that the soldiers acted on their own, since Bardanes was no longer a credible threat to the Emperor. In the event, despite pressure from the Patriarch and the Senate to punish the perpetrators, and his own pledge to do so, Nikephoros let them go.

Bardanes' revolt temporarily weakened Byzantium, especially in its capability to deal with the Arab threat to the East, but al-Qasim's invasion was of limited scope, and his father's far larger invasion in 806 also resulted in no major military confrontations: Harun withdrew after a truce was concluded in exchange for a modest sum. Thus the revolt did not seriously affect the army or most of Anatolia. Nevertheless, it is indicative of the soldiers' dissatisfaction with Nikephoros, which would surface again in subsequent years and prove a constant source of trouble throughout his reign.

== Family ==
Bardanes was married to a woman named Domnika, with whom he had several children. Thekla, the wife of Michael the Amorian, is usually identified with one of them, as Theophanes Continuatus and Genesius record that Bardanes married two of his daughters to Michael the Amorian and another of his aides. Treadgold identifies the second daughter with a woman named or nicknamed Barka, whom he regards as the first wife of Leo the Armenian and whom Leo divorced shortly after his accession in 813 in order to marry Theodosia. She would then be the real mother of Leo's firstborn son, Symbatios/Constantine. Theodosia, however, is the only clearly attested wife of Leo, and there is no evidence for a divorce and remarriage. Leo is also named the "cousin" of Bardanes, but it is unclear whether this is literal or in the meaning of "brother in law". If the former is the case, the familial relationship alone would bar any such marriage. In addition, the tale is very likely simply a later invention, inspired by the marriage of Thekla to Michael the Amorian. A son by the name of Bryennios or Bryenes (a possible ancestor of the Bryennios family) is known, who held a high official post in 813. An unnamed, unmarried daughter is recorded, as well as several other unnamed younger children, in 803; along with Domnika, they were left a part of Bardanes' fortune, part of which was donated to the poor, and the rest used to found a small monastery in Constantinople, where they retired.

== Sources ==
- Cheynet, Jean-Claude (2006). The Byzantine Aristocracy and Its Military Function. Aldershot, Hampshire: Ashgate Publishing. ISBN 978-0-7546-5902-0.
- Garland, Linda (2006). Byzantine Women: Varieties of Experience 800–1200. Aldershot, Hampshire: Ashgate Publishing. ISBN 978-0-7546-5737-8.
- Kaegi, Walter Emil (1981). Byzantine Military Unrest, 471–843: An Interpretation. Amsterdam: Adolf M. Hakkert. ISBN 90-256-0902-3.
- Kazhdan, Alexander, ed. (1991). The Oxford Dictionary of Byzantium. Oxford and New York: Oxford University Press. ISBN 0-19-504652-8.
- Kiapidou, Irini-Sofia (17 January 2003). "Rebellion of Bardanes Tourkos, 803". Encyclopaedia of the Hellenic World, Asia Minor. Athens: Foundation of the Hellenic World. Archived from the original on 11 August 2011.
- Kountoura-Galaki, Eleonora (1983). "Ἡ ἐπανάσταση τοῦ Βαρδάνη Τούρκου" [The revolt of Bardanes Tourkos]. Byzantine Symmeikta (in Greek). 5 (5): 203–215. doi:10.12681/byzsym.685. hdl:10442/14959. ISSN 1105-1639.
- Lilie, Ralph Johannes (1996). Byzanz unter Eirene und Konstantin VI. (780–802) (in German). Frankfurt am Main: Peter Lang. ISBN 3-631-30582-6.
- Lilie, Ralph-Johannes; Ludwig, Claudia; Pratsch, Thomas; Zielke, Beate (1999). Prosopographie der mittelbyzantinischen Zeit: 1. Abteilung (641–867), Band 1: Aaron (# 1) – Georgios (# 2182) (in German). Berlin and Boston: De Gruyter. ISBN 978-3-11-015179-4.
- Lilie, Ralph-Johannes; Ludwig, Claudia; Pratsch, Thomas; Zielke, Beate (2000). Prosopographie der mittelbyzantinischen Zeit: 1. Abteilung (641–867), Band 2: Georgios (# 2183) – Leon (# 4270) (in German). Berlin and Boston: De Gruyter. ISBN 978-3-11-016672-9.
- Mango, Cyril; Scott, Roger (1997). The Chronicle of Theophanes Confessor. Byzantine and Near Eastern History, AD 284–813. Oxford: Oxford University Press. ISBN 0-19-822568-7.
- Treadgold, Warren (1988). The Byzantine Revival, 780–842. Stanford, California: Stanford University Press. ISBN 978-0-8047-1462-4.
