= Thekla (wife of Michael II) =

Byzantine empress (820–c. 823)

Empress of the Byzantine Empire
- Tenure: 820 – c. 823
- Died: c. 823
- Spouse: Michael II
- Issue: Theophilos; Helena (disputed)
- Father: Bardanes Tourkos

Thekla (Θέκλα; died c. 823) was the first empress consort of Michael II of the Byzantine Empire.

== Family ==
According to Theophanes the Confessor, Thekla was the daughter of an unnamed strategos of the Anatolic Theme, where Michael served. On this account, her father has been identified with the general and later rebel Bardanes Tourkos. Michael, along with Leo the Armenian and Thomas the Slav, were close associates of Bardanes, although during his revolt in summer 803, both Michael and Leo deserted him.

Thekla and Michael had only one known son, the Emperor Theophilos (813 – 20 January 842). The existence of a daughter called Helena is possible but there is a contradiction between different sources. Helena is known as the wife of Theophobos, a patrician executed in 842 for conspiring to gain the throne for himself. George Hamartolus and Theophanes report him marrying the sister of the Empress Theodora. Joseph Genesius records Theophobos marrying the sister of the Emperor Theophilos. Whether Helena was sister or sister-in-law to Theophilos is thus unclear.

== Empress ==
In 820, Leo V accused his former comrade-in-arms Michael of conspiring against him. Michael was imprisoned but his co-conspirators organized the assassination of Leo in the cathedral Hagia Sophia on Christmas in 820. Leo had entered the cathedral unarmed and was thus unable to successfully defend himself. Michael succeeded him as Emperor with Thekla becoming the new Empress.

Her term as Augusta was brief and unremarkable. She died around 823. Michael proceeded to marry Euphrosyne, a daughter of Constantine VI.

== Sources ==
- Lynda Garland, Byzantine Women:Varieties of Experience 800-1200 (2006)

Royal titles
Preceded by Theodosia	Byzantine Empress consort 820 – c. 823	Succeeded by Euphrosyne
