= Theodore the Studite =

Byzantine monk, abbot, and scholar

Saint Theodore the Studite
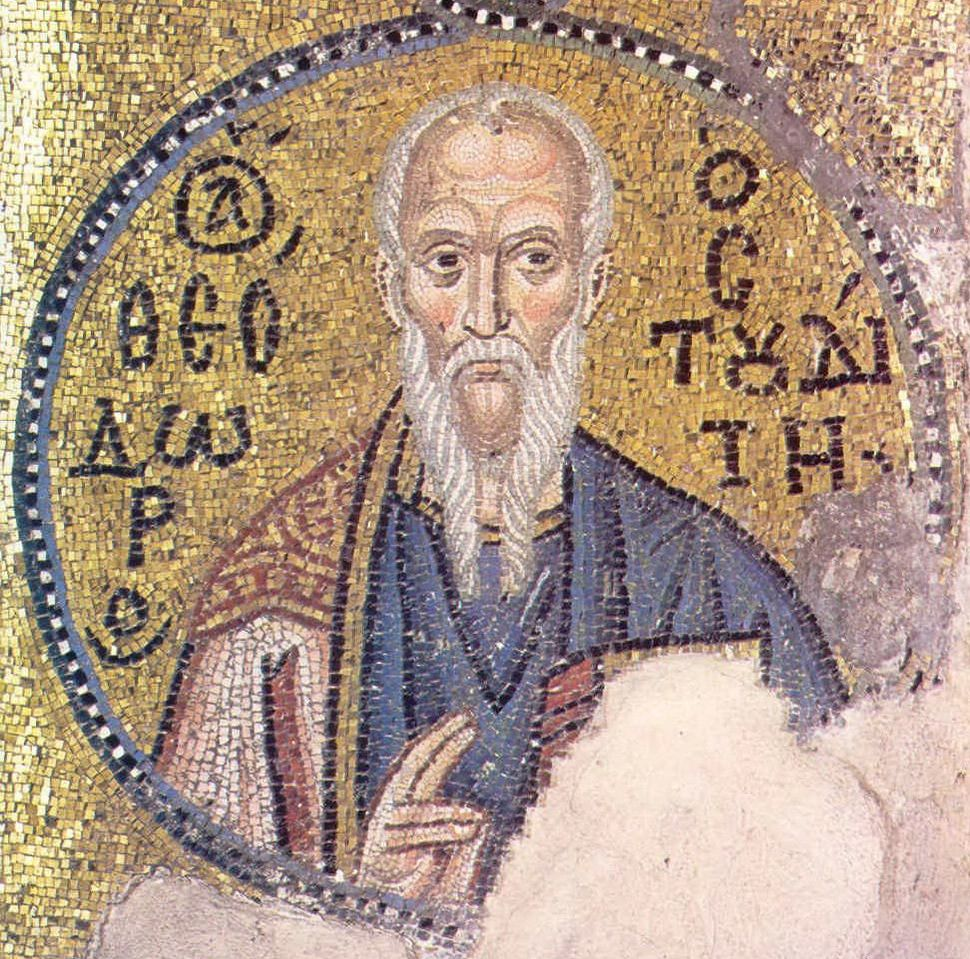
- Saint Theodore of Studion: 11th-century mosaic from Nea Moni Monastery, Chios

Monk
- Born: 759; Constantinople (modern-day Istanbul, Turkey)
- Died: 11 November 826 (aged 66/67); Cape Akritas (modern-day Tuzla, Istanbul, Turkey)
- Venerated in: Catholic Church; Eastern Orthodox Church
- Feast: 11 November (East), 12 November (West)

Theodore the Studite (Greek: Θεόδωρος ὁ Στουδίτης, romanized: Theodōros ho Stoudítes; 759–826), also known as Theodorus Studita and Saint Theodore of Stoudios/Studium, was a Byzantine Greek monk and abbot of the Stoudios Monastery in Constantinople. He played a major role in the revivals both of Byzantine monasticism and of classical literary genres in Byzantium. He is known as a zealous opponent of iconoclasm, one of several conflicts that set him at odds with both emperor and patriarch. Throughout his life he maintained letter correspondences with many important political and cultural figures of the Byzantine empire; this included many women, such as the composer and nun Kassia, who was much influenced by his teachings.

== Biography ==
=== Family and childhood ===
Theodore was born in Constantinople in 759. He was the oldest son of Photios or Photeinos, an important financial official in the palace bureaucracy, and Theoktiste, herself the offspring of a distinguished Constantinopolitan family. The brother of Theoktiste, Theodore's uncle Plato, was an important official in the imperial financial administration. The family therefore controlled a significant portion, if not all, of the imperial financial administration during the reign of Constantine V (r. 741–775). Theodore had two younger brothers (Joseph, later Archbishop of Thessalonica, and Euthymios) and one sister, whose name we do not know.

It has often been assumed that Theodore's family belonged to the iconodule party during the first period of Byzantine Iconoclasm. There is however no evidence to support this, and their high position in the imperial bureaucracy of the time renders any openly iconodule position highly unlikely. Furthermore, when Platon left his office and entered the priesthood in 759, he was ordained by an abbot who, if he was not actively iconoclastic himself, at the very least offered no resistance to the iconoclastic policies of Constantine V. The family as a whole was most likely indifferent to the question of icons during this period.

According to the later hagiographical literature, Theodore received an education befitting his family's station and from the age of seven was instructed by a private tutor, eventually concentrating in particular on theology. It is however not clear that these opportunities were available to even the most well-placed Byzantine families of the eighth century, and it is possible that Theodore was at least partially an autodidact.

=== Early monastic career ===
Following the death of Emperor Leo IV (r. 775–780) in 780, Theodore's uncle Platon, who had lived as a monk in the Symbola Monastery in Bithynia since 759, visited Constantinople, and persuaded the entire family of his sister, Theoktiste, to likewise take monastic vows. Theodore, together with his father and brothers, sailed back to Bithynia with Platon in 781, where they set about transforming the family estate into a religious establishment, which became known as the Sakkudion Monastery. Platon became abbot of the new foundation, and Theodore was his "right hand." The two sought to order the monastery according to the writings of Basil of Caesarea.

During the period of the regency of Eirene, Abbot Platon emerged as a supporter of the Patriarch Tarasios, and was a member of Tarasios's iconodule party at the Second Council of Nicaea, where the veneration of icons was declared orthodox. Shortly thereafter Tarasios himself ordained Theodore as a priest. In 794, Theodore became abbot of the Sakkudion Monastery, while Platon withdrew from the daily operation of the monastery and dedicated himself to silence.

=== Conflict with Constantine VI ===
Also in 794, Emperor Constantine VI (r. 776–797) decided to separate from his first wife, Maria of Amnia, and to marry Maria's kubikularia (Lady-in-waiting), Theodote, a cousin of Theodore the Studite. Although the Patriarch may initially have resisted this development, as a divorce without proof of adultery on the part of the wife could be construed as illegal, he ultimately gave way. The marriage of Constantine and Theodote was celebrated in 795, although not by the patriarch, as was normal, but by a certain Joseph, a priest of Hagia Sophia.

A somewhat obscure chain of events followed (the so-called "Moechian controversy," from the Greek moichos, "adulterer"), in which Theodore initiated a protest against the marriage from the Sakkudion Monastery, and appears to have demanded the excommunication, not only of the priest Joseph, but also of all who had received communion from him, which, as Joseph was a priest of the imperial church, included implicitly the emperor and his court. This demand had no official weight, however, and Constantine appears to have attempted to make peace with Theodore and Platon (who, on account of his marriage, were now his relatives), inviting them to visit him during a sojourn at the imperial baths of Prusa in Bithynia. In the event neither appeared.

As a result, imperial troops were sent to the Sakkudion Monastery, and the community was dispersed. Theodore was flogged, and, together with ten other monks, banished to Thessaloniki, while Platon was imprisoned in Constantinople. The monks arrived in Thessaloniki in March 797, but did not remain for long; in August of the same year Constantine VI was blinded and overthrown, and his mother Irene, the new empress, lifted the exile.

=== Abbot of the Studites ===
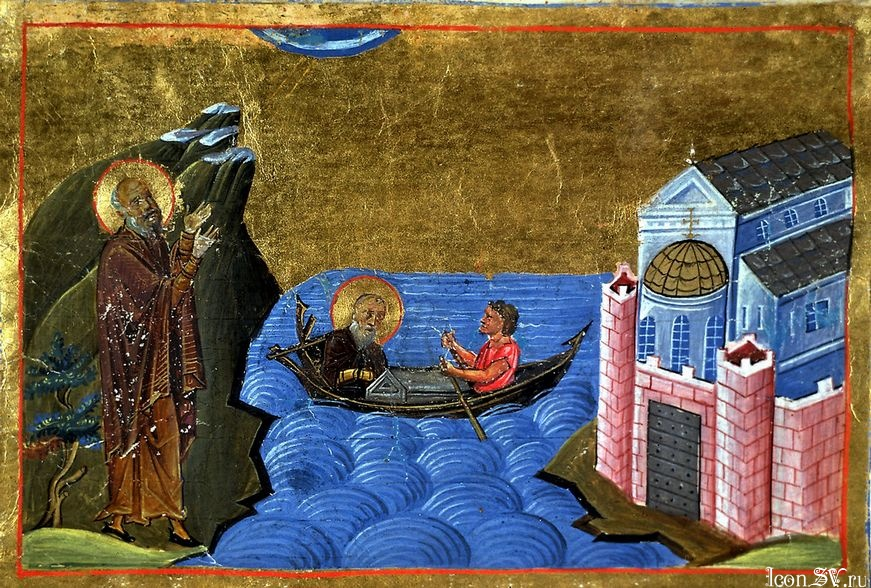
The Stoudios Monastery as depicted in an 11th-century manuscript.

Following the accession of Irene, the priest Joseph was stripped of his office, and Theodoros was received in the imperial palace. The monks then returned to the Sakkudion Monastery, but were forced back to the capital in either 797 or 798 on account of an Arab raid on Bithynia. At this time, Irene offered Theodore the leadership of the ancient Stoudios Monastery in Constantinople, which he accepted. Theodore then set about building various workshops within the monastery to guarantee autarky, constructing a library and a scriptorium, and restoring and decorating the church. He also composed a series of poems on the duties of the various members of the community, which were likely inscribed and displayed within the monastery. He furthermore composed a rule for the governance of the monastery, and made the Studios community the center of an extensive congregation of dependent monasteries, including the Sakkudion. He maintained contact with these other monasteries above all through his prodigious literary output (letters as well as catechisms), which reached a quantitative peak at this time, and developed a system of messengers that was so elaborate as to resemble a private postal service.

To this period may also date the so-called iconodule epigrams, iambic acrostics composed by Theodore that replaced the "iconoclastic epigrams" which were previously exhibited on the Chalke gate of the Great Palace. It has been suggested that these were commissioned by Irene, as another sign of her good favor toward Theodore, although a commission under Michael I Rangabe (r. 811–813) is also possible; in any case, they were removed in 815 by Leo V the Armenian (r. 813–820) and replaced by new "iconoclastic" verses.

In 806, the Patriarch Tarasios died, and Emperor Nikephoros I (r. 802–811) set about seeking his replacement. It appears likely that Platon at this time put forth Theodore's name, but Nikephoros, a layman who held the rank of asekretis in the imperial bureaucracy, was chosen instead. The selection of Nikephoros gave rise to an immediate protest on the part of the Studites, and in particular Theodore and Platon, who objected to the elevation of a layman to the patriarchal throne. Theodore and Platon were jailed for 24 days before the Emperor Nikephoros allowed them to return to their congregations.

=== Conflict with Nikephoros ===
Emperor Nikephoros soon requested that his new patriarch rehabilitate the priest Joseph, who had officiated at the wedding of Constantine and Theodote, possibly because Joseph had aided in the peaceful resolution of the revolt of Bardanes Tourkos. In 806, the Patriarch Nikephoros convened a synod to address the case, at which Theodore was present. The Synod decided to readmit Joseph to the priesthood, a decision to which Theodore did not at the time object.

Therefore, relations between the Studite Abbot and the Patriarch appear to have been initially untroubled, an impression which is reinforced by the choice (806/807) of Theodore's brother, Joseph, as Archbishop of Thessaloniki. However, soon after this ordination, perhaps in 808, Theodore began to express his unwillingness to associate with the rehabilitated priest Joseph, or for that matter with anyone else who knowingly associated with him, as he held the rehabilitation to be uncanonical. As in the first dispute over the priest Joseph, the extension of this refusal beyond Joseph to those who associated with him included implicitly the patriarch and the emperor himself.

Early in 808, Theodoros offered in a series of letters to explain his position to the emperor, and furthermore to perform the customary proskynesis at his feet, which offer Nikephoros declined, instead setting off for the summer military campaign. In the winter of the same year, Theodore's brother Joseph visited him in Constantinople, but refused to attend the Christmas mass in Hagia Sophia, at which the emperor, the patriarch, and the priest Joseph would have been present. As a result, he was stripped of his archbishopric. At around the same time a small military division was dispatched to the Stoudios Monastery to arrest Theodore, Joseph, and Platon. A synod was then held in January of 809, at which Theodore and his followers were anathematized as schismatic. Theodore, Joseph, and Platon were thereafter banished to the Princes' Islands: Theodore to Chalke, Joseph to Prote, and Platon to Oxeia.

Theodore maintained an extensive literary activity in exile, writing numerous letters to correspondents including his brother, various Studite monks, influential family members, and even Pope Leo III. He also continued to compose catechisms for the Studite congregation, as well as a number of poems.

=== Rehabilitation under Michael I ===
In 811, the new emperor Michael I Rangabe called the Studites back from exile. The priest Joseph was once more defrocked, and Theodore was, at least superficially, reconciled with the Patriarch Nikephoros.

There are, however, indications that a certain rivalry between the Studite Abbot and the Patriarch persisted. In 812, Michael I resolved to persecute certain heretics in Phrygia and Lycaonia, namely the Paulicians and the "Athinganoi" (sometimes identified with the Roma). Theodore and Nikephoros were called before the emperor to debate the legality of punishing heresy by death, Theodore arguing against and Nikephoros for. Theodore is said to have won the day.

The second affair concerned a peace treaty proposed by Krum of Bulgaria (r. 803–814), also in 812, according to which the Byzantine and Bulgarian states should exchange refugees. It is likely that Krum sought the return of certain Bulgarians who had betrayed him to the Byzantines. In this instance Theodore argued against the exchange, as it would require that Christians be cast to barbarians, while Nikephoros urged the emperor to accept the treaty. Once more Theodore's opinion prevailed, although this time with serious consequences; Krum attacked and took Mesembria in November the same year. Michael led a military campaign against the Bulgarians in 813, which ended in defeat, and as a result he abdicated in July and Leo V was crowned emperor.

On 4 April 814 Theodore's uncle Platon died in the Stoudios Monastery after a long illness. Theodore composed a long funeral oration, the Laudatio Platonis, which remains one of the most important sources for the history of the family.

=== Second Iconoclasm ===
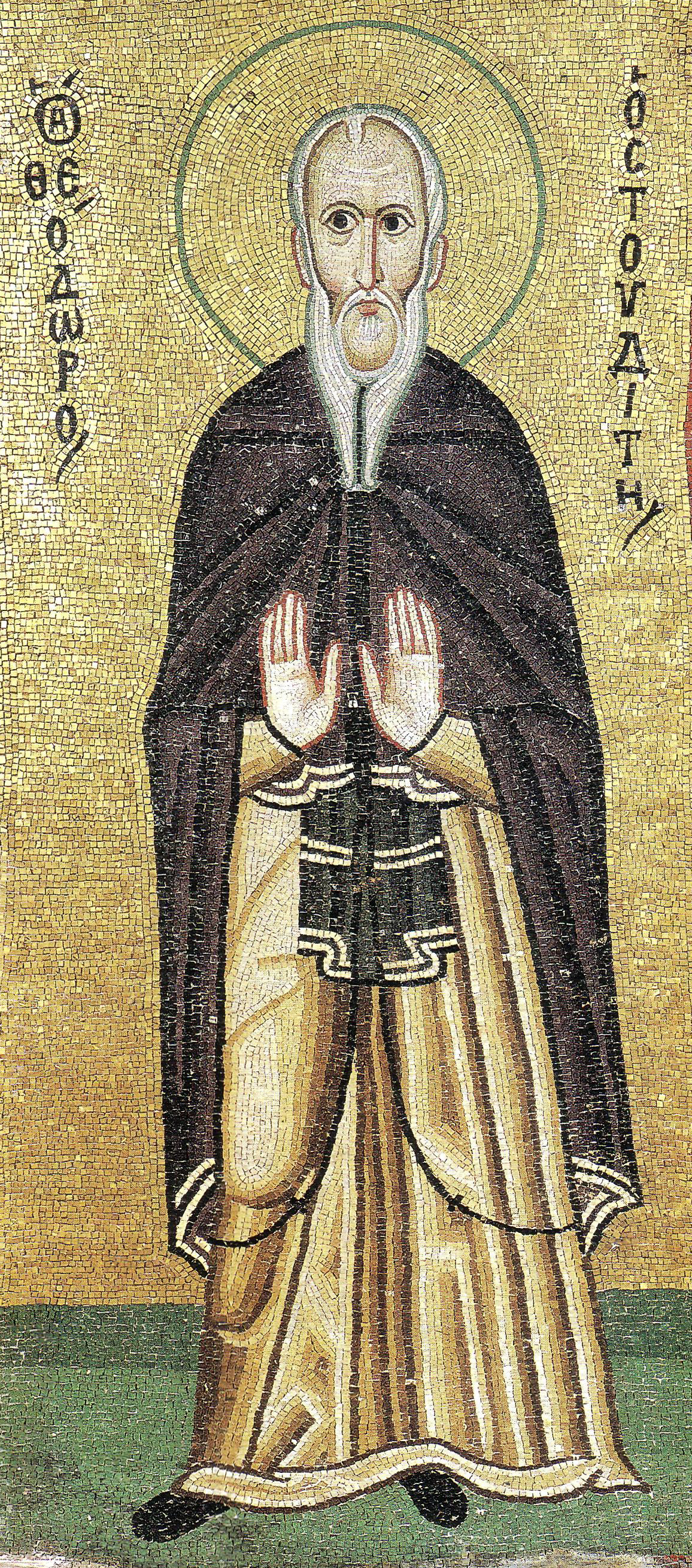
Mosaic of Theodore the Studite located in Hosios Loukas.

At the very beginning of his reign, the emperor Leo V faced a new Bulgarian offensive that reached the walls of Constantinople and ravaged large sections of Thrace. This came to an end with the death of Krum on April 13, 814, and the internal power struggles that followed. However, as the previous 30 years since the approval of icon-veneration at the Synod of 787 had represented for the Byzantines a string of military catastrophes, Leo resolved to reach back to the policies of the more successful Isaurian dynasty. He renamed his son Constantine, thus drawing a parallel to Leo III (r. 717–741) and Constantine V, and beginning in 814 began to discuss with various clerics and senators the possibility of reviving the iconoclastic policy of the Isaurians. This movement met with strong opposition from the Patriarch Nikephoros, who himself gathered a group of bishops and abbots about him and swore them to uphold the veneration of images. The dispute came to a head in a debate between the two parties before the emperor in the Great Palace in early 815, at which Theodore and his brother Joseph were present and took the side of the iconodules. Theodore told the emperor: "Know that though an angel came from heaven itself to pervert us we would not obey him. Far less would we obey you."

Leo held fast by his plan to revive iconoclasm, and in March 815 the Patrarch Nikephoros was stripped of his office and exiled to Bithynia. At this point Theodore remained in Constantinople, and assumed a leading role in the iconodule opposition. On March 25, Palm Sunday, he commanded his monks to process through the monastery's vineyard, holding up icons so that they could be seen over the walls by the neighbors. This provocation elicited only a rebuke from the emperor.

A new patriarch, Theodotos, was selected, and in April a synod was convened in Hagia Sophia, at which iconoclasm was re-introduced as dogma. Theodore composed a series of letters in which he called on "all, near and far," to revolt against the decision of the synod. Not long thereafter he was exiled by imperial command to a Metopa, a fortress on the eastern shore of Lake Apollonia in Bithynia. Shortly thereafter Leo had Theodore's poems removed from the Chalke Gate and replaced by a new set of "iconoclastic" epigrams.

While Theodore was in exile, the leadership of the Studite congregation was assumed by the Abbot Leontios, who for a time adopted the iconoclast position and won over many individual monks to his party. He was, however, eventually won back to the iconodule party. The Studite situation mirrored a general trend, with a number of bishops and abbots at first willing to reach a compromise with the iconoclasts, but then in the years between 816 and 819 renouncing the iconoclast position, a movement that was perhaps motivated by the martyrdom of the Studite monk Thaddaios. It was during this upswell in icondule sentiment that Theodore began to compose his own polemic against the iconoclasts, the Refutatio, concentrating in particular on refuting the arguments and criticizing the literary merits of the new iconoclastic epigrams on the Chalke.

Theodore exercised a wide influence during the first year of his exile, primarily through a massive letter-writing campaign. Accordingly, he was transferred in 816 to Boneta, a fortress in the more remote Anatolic theme, whence he nevertheless remained abreast of developments in the capital and maintained a regular correspondence. This continued activity led to an imperial order that Theodore be whipped, which his captors however refused to carry out. In 817, Theodore wrote two letters to Pope Paschal I, which were co-signed by several fellow iconodule abbots, in the first requesting that he summon an anti-iconoclastic Synod; letters to the Patriarchs of Alexandria and Jerusalem, among other "foreign" clerics, followed. As a result, the emperor ordered at least once more that Theodore be flogged, and the command was this time carried out, with the result that Theodore became quite ill. After his recovery Theodore was moved to Smyrna. Early in 821, however, Leo V fell victim to a grisly murder at the altar of the Church of St. Stephen in the imperial palace; Theodore was released from exile shortly thereafter.

=== Final years ===
Following his release, Theodore made his way back to Constantinople, travelling through north-western Anatolia and meeting with numerous monks and abbots on the way. At the time he appears to have believed that the new emperor, Michael II (r. 820–829), would adopt a pro-icons policy, and he expressed this hope in two letters to Michael. An imperial audience was arranged for a group of iconodule clerics, including Theodore, at which however Michael expressed his intention to "leave the church as he had found it." The abbots were to be allowed to venerate images if they so wished, as long as they remained outside of Constantinople. Theodore returned to Anatolia, in what seems to have been a sort of self-imposed exile.

Theodore's activities in his final years are somewhat difficult to trace. He continued to write numerous letters supporting the use of icons, and appears to have remained an important leader of the opposition to imperial iconoclasm. He was present at a meeting of "more than a hundred" iconodule clerics in 823 or 824, which ended in an argument between the Studites and the host, one Ioannikos, which may have represented a power struggle within the movement. Theodore also spoke against the second marriage of Michael II to the nun Euphrosyne, a daughter of Constantine VI, although in a very moderate fashion, and with none of the passion or effect of the Moechian controversy.

Theodore's years of exile, regular fasting, and exceptional exertions had taken their toll, and in 826 he became quite ill. In this year, he dictated his Testament, a form of spiritual guidance for the future abbots of the Stoudios monastery, to his disciple Naukratios. He died on 11 November that year, while celebrating mass, apparently in the monastery of Hagios Tryphon on Cape Akritas in Bithynia. Eighteen years later, his remains, along with those of his brother Joseph, were brought back to the Stoudios Monastery, where they were interred beside the grave of their uncle Platon.

== Legacy ==
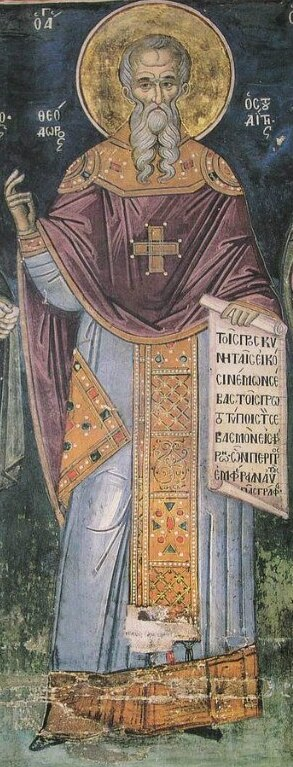
Fresco from Dionysiou Monastery

Theodore's revival of the Stoudios monastery had a major effect on the later history of Byzantine monasticism. His disciple, Naukratios, recovered control of the monastery after the end of iconoclasm in 842, and throughout the remainder of the ninth century the Studite abbots continued Theodore's tradition of opposition to patriarchal and imperial authority. Elements of Theodore's Testament were incorporated verbatim in the typika of certain early Athonite monasteries. The most important elements of his reform were its emphases on cenobitic (communal) life, manual labor, and a carefully defined administrative hierarchy.

Theodore also built the Stoudios monastery into a major scholarly center, in particular through its library and scriptorium, which certainly surpassed all other contemporary Byzantine ecclesiastical institutions in this regard. Theodore himself was a pivotal figure in the revival of classical literary forms, in particular iambic verse, in Byzantium, and his criticisms of the iconoclastic epigrams drew a connection between literary skill and orthodox faith. After his death the Stoudios monastery continued to be a vital center for Byzantine hymnography and hagiography, as well as for the copying of manuscripts.

Following the "triumph of Orthodoxy" (i.e. the reintroduction of icons) in 843, Theodore became one of the great heroes of the iconodule opposition. There was no formal process of canonization in Byzantium, but Theodore was soon recognized as a saint. In the Latin West, Theodore’s recognition of papal primacy on the basis of his letters to Pope Paschal I was part of what caused him to be formally canonized by the Catholic Church. His feast day is 11 November in the East and 12 November in the West.

== Works ==
Theodore was an immensely prolific author; among his most important works are:

- His letters, which convey many personal details, as well as illuminating a number of his historical engagements. Ed. with summaries in German by Georgios Fatouros, Theodori Studitae Epistulae (=CFHB 31) (Berlin, 1992) [two volumes]. ISBN 3-11-008808-8.
- His poems, which represent an important stage in the revival of classical verse in Byzantium. Ed. with German translation by Paul Speck, Theodoros Studites: Jamben auf verschiedene Gegenstände (=Supplementa Byzantina 1) (Berlin, 1968).
- Catecheses, two collections of addresses to his monks on various subjects connected with the spiritual life. The first collection (the "magna") ed. A. Papadopulos-Kerameus, Theodori Studitae Magna Catachesis (St. Petersburg, 1904); the second (the "parva") ed. E. Auvray, S.P.N. et Confessoris Theodori Studitis Praepositi Parva Catachesis (Paris, 1891), French translation by Anne-Marie Mohr, Petites catéchèses (=Les Pères dans la foi 52) (Paris, 1993).
- The funeral oration on his mother. Ed. and tr. St. Efthymiadis and J. M. Featherstone, "Establishing a holy lineage: Theodore the Stoudite's funerary catechism for his mother (Bibliotheca hagiographica graeca 2422)," in M. Grünbart, ed., Theatron: rhetorische Kultur in Spätantike und Mittelalter (=Millennium-Studien 13) (Berlin, 2007), pp. 13–51. ISBN 3-11-019476-7.
- The funeral oration on his uncle Plato (Theodori Studitae Oratio funebris in Platonem ejus patrem spiritualem, PG 99, pp. 803–850).
- Various polemical discourses connected with the question of image-worship, in particular Theodori praepositi Studitarum Antirrhetici adversus Iconomachos, PG 99, 327B-436A and Theodori Studitae Refutatio et subversio impiorum poematum Ioannis, Ignatii, Sergii, et Stephani, recentium christomachorum Cf. the selection translated by Catharine Roth, On the holy icons (Crestwood, 1981). ISBN 0-913836-76-1
- His Testament, dictated to his disciple Naukratios at the end of his life: PG 99, 1813–24. English translation by Timothy Miller, in J. Thomas and A. C. Hero, eds., Byzantine Monastic Foundation Documents (=Dumbarton Oaks Studies 35) (Washington, 2000), I.67–83. ISBN 0-88402-232-3; Available online.
- A sermon on the Apostle Bartholomew, ed. with Italian translation by Giorgio di Maria in V. Giustolisi, ed., Tre laudationes bizantine in onore di San Bartolomeo apostolo (Palermo, 2004).

== Commentary on Theodore ==
As also mentioned by Kirby Page in Jesus or Christianity, Charles Loring Brace tells us in Gesta Christi that it was not until the 9th century that the first recorded stand against slavery itself was taken by Theodore:

No direct word against slavery, however, came forth from the great Teacher [Jesus Christ]. It was not until the ninth century after, that one of his humble followers, Saint Theodore of Studium (Constantinople), ventured to put forth the command "Thou shalt possess no slave, neither for domestic service nor for the labor of the fields, for man is made in the image of God."
