= Empress Euphrosyne =

Empress Euphrosyne can refer to several people:

- Euphrosyne (9th century) (c.790 – after 836), Byzantine empress
- Euphrosyne Doukaina Kamatera (c. 1155 – 1211), Byzantine empress
