= Tarasios of Constantinople =

Ecumenical Patriarch of Constantinople from 784 to 806

Saint Tarasios of Constantinople
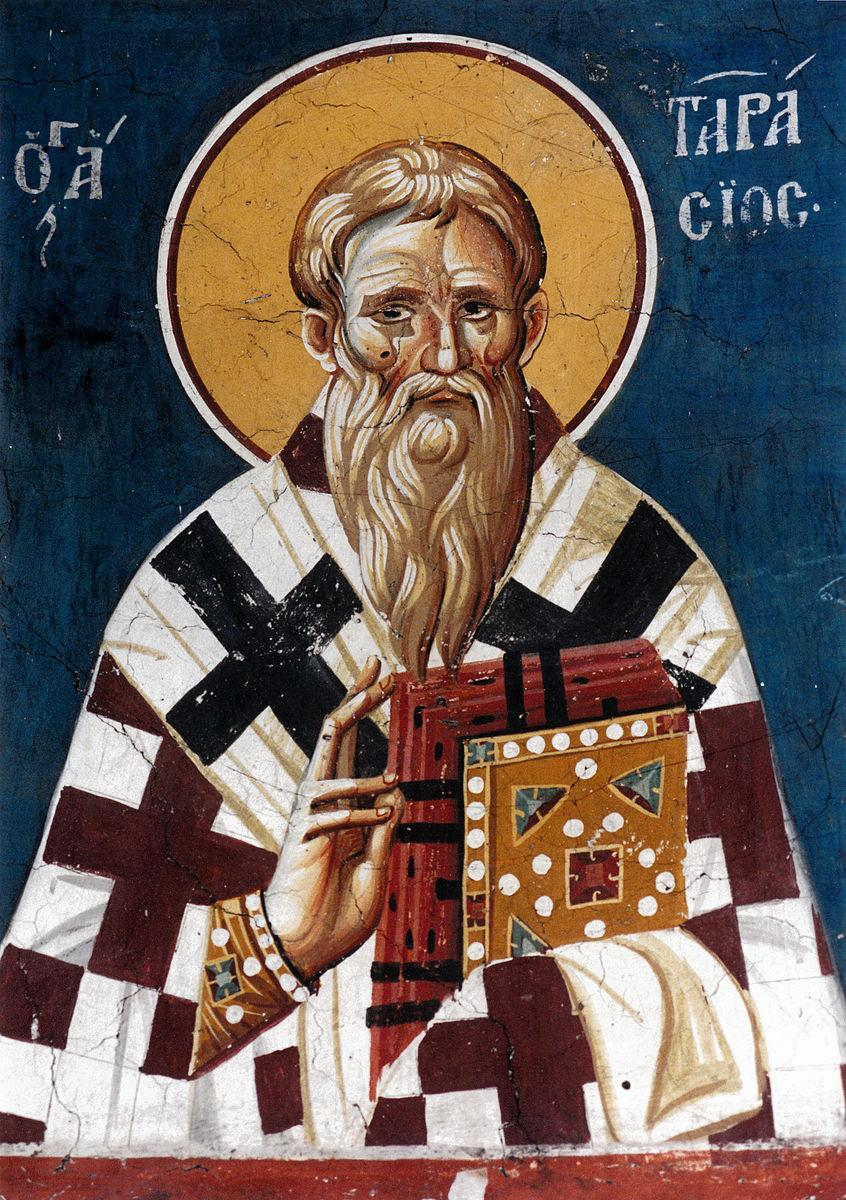
- Fresco from the Church of St. Mary Peribleptos, Ohrid

Ecumenical Patriarch of Constantinople
- Born: c. 730; Constantinople
- Died: 25 February 806; Constantinople
- Venerated in: Eastern Orthodox Church, Catholic Church
- Canonized: Pre-congregation
- Feast: 18 February (Catholic Church) (General Roman Calendar); 25 February (Eastern Orthodox Church)
- Attributes: Vested as a bishop with omophorion often holding a Gospel book with his right hand raised in blessing

Saint Tarasios of Constantinople
- Ecumenical Patriarch of Constantinople
- Installed: 25 December 784
- Term ended: 25 February 806
- Predecessor: Paul IV of Constantinople
- Successor: Nicephorus I of Constantinople

Personal details
- Born: c. 730 Constantinople
- Died: 25 February 806
- Denomination: Chalcedonian Christianity

Tarasios of Constantinople (also Saint Tarasius and Saint Tarasios; Greek: Ταράσιος; c. 730 – 25 February 806) was the Ecumenical Patriarch of Constantinople from 25 December 784 until his death on 25 February 806.

== Background ==
Tarasios was born and raised in the city of Constantinople. A son of a high-ranking judge, Tarasios was related to important families, including that of the later Patriarch Photios I of Constantinople. He had an elder brother, Sisinnios, who was captured during the invasion of Calabria in 788–789.

Tarasios had embarked on a career in the secular administration and had attained the rank of senator, eventually becoming imperial secretary (asekretis) to the Emperor Constantine VI and his mother, the Empress Irene of Athens. When Patriarch Paul IV of Constantinople retired to a monastery, he recommended the lay administrator Tarasios as his successor.

Since Tarasios exhibited both Iconodule sympathies and the willingness to follow imperial commands when they were not contrary to the faith, he was selected as Ecumenical Patriarch of Constantinople by Empress Irene in 784, even though he was a layman at the time. Nevertheless, like all educated Byzantines, he was well versed in theology, and the election of qualified laymen as bishops was not unheard of in the history of the Church.

He reluctantly accepted, on condition that church unity would be restored with Rome and the Oriental Patriarchs, and a council be called to address the iconoclast controversy. To make him eligible for the office of patriarch, Tarasios was duly ordained to the deaconate and then the priesthood, prior to his consecration as bishop.

== Second Council of Nicaea ==
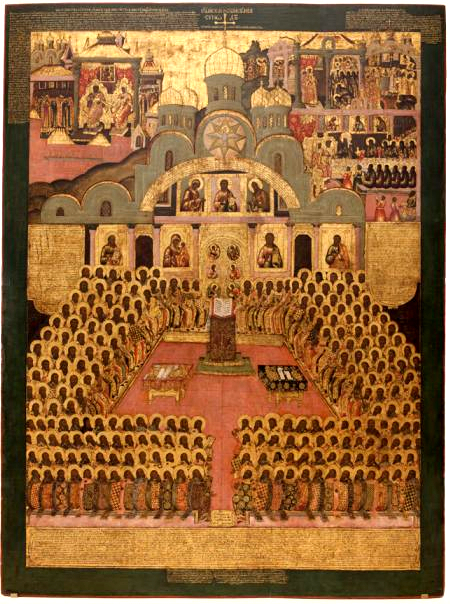
Icon of the Second Council of Nicaea (17th century, Novodevichy Convent, Moscow)

Before accepting the dignity of Patriarch, Tarasios had demanded and obtained the promise that the veneration of icons would be restored in the church. As a part of his policy of improving relations with Rome, he persuaded Empress Irene to write to Pope Adrian I, inviting him to send delegates to Constantinople for a new council, to repudiate heresy. The Pope agreed to send delegates, although he disapproved of the appointment of a layman to the patriarchate. The council convened in the Church of the Holy Apostles on 17 August 786. Mutinous troops burst into the church and dispersed the delegates. The shaken papal legates at once took ship for Rome. The mutinous troops were removed from the city, and the legates reassembled at Nicaea in September 787. The Patriarch served as acting chairman (Christ was considered the true chairman). The council, known as the Second Council of Nicaea, condemned Iconoclasm and formally approved the veneration of icons. The patriarch assumed a moderate policy towards former Iconoclasts, which incurred the opposition of Theodore the Studite and his partisans.

== Divorce of Constantine VI ==
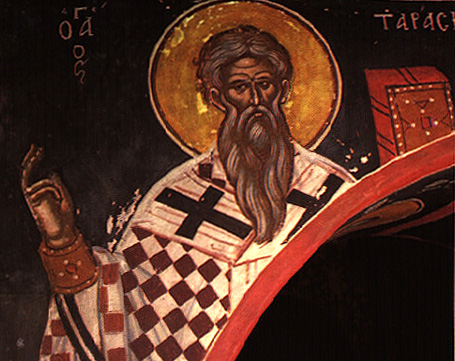
Depiction of Tarasios by Theophanes the Cretan

About a decade later, Tarasios became involved in a new controversy. In January 795, Emperor Constantine VI divorced his wife, Maria of Amnia, and Tarasios reluctantly condoned the divorce. The monks were scandalised by the patriarch's consent. The leaders of the protest, Abbot Plato of Sakkoudion and his nephew Theodore the Studite, were exiled, but the uproar continued. Much of the anger was directed at Tarasios for allowing the subsequent marriage of the emperor to Theodote to take place, although he had refused to officiate. Under severe pressure from Theodore the Studite, Tarasios excommunicated the priest who had conducted Constantine's second marriage.

== End of Patriarchate ==
Tarasios continued to loyally serve the subsequent imperial regimes of Irene and Nikephoros I. The patriarch's reputation suffered from criticism of his alleged tolerance of simony. On the other hand, his pliability proved most welcome to three very different monarchs and accounts for Tarasios's continuation in office until his death. The later selections of the laymen Nikephoros I of Constantinople and Photios I of Constantinople as patriarchs may have been in part inspired by the example set by Tarasios.

== Sainthood ==
Though some later scholars have been critical of what they perceive as Tarasios's weakness before imperial power, he continues to be revered in the Eastern Orthodox Church for his defence of the use of icons, and his struggle for the peace and unity of the Church. His feast day is celebrated on 25 February by the Eastern Orthodox and Byzantine Rite Eastern Catholic Churches (This date on the Julian Calendar at present corresponds to 10 March in common years and 9 March in leap years on the Gregorian Calendar) and on 18 February by Latin Church Catholics.

== Bibliography ==
- The Oxford Dictionary of Byzantium, Oxford University Press, 1991.
- The Oxford Dictionary of the Christian Church, third edition.
- Byzantium - the Early Centuries by John Julius Norwich, 1988.

Titles of Chalcedonian Christianity
Preceded by Paul IV	Ecumenical Patriarch of Constantinople; 784 – 806	Succeeded by Nicephorus I
