= Battle of Mesembria =

Battle between Byzantine and Bulgarian forces during the war of Khan Khrum

- Part of the Byzantine–Bulgarian wars
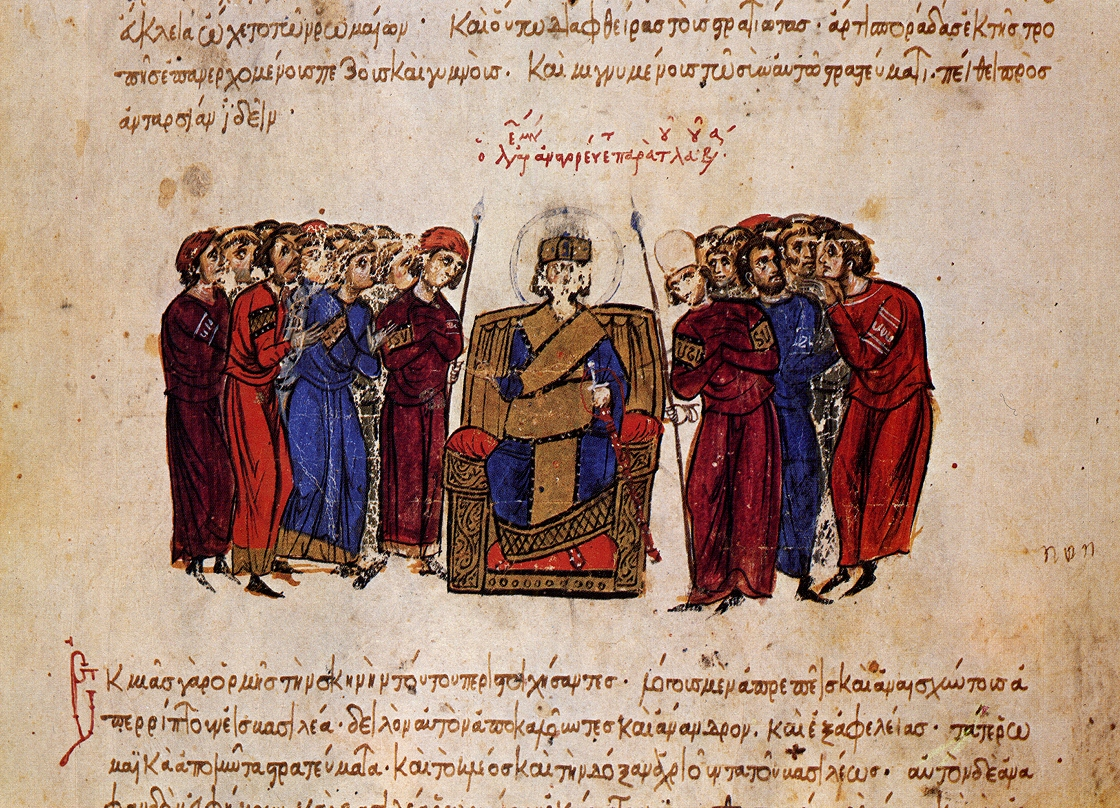
- The proclamation of Emperor Leo V the Armenian.
Date	813/814
Location	Nesebar
Result	Byzantine victory

Belligerents
First Bulgarian Empire	Byzantine Empire

Commanders and leaders
Unknown	Leo V

Strength
Unknown	Unknown

Casualties and losses
Very heavy	Light

The Battle of Mesambria was a battle between the Byzantines and the Bulgarians during the war of Khan Krum. In this battle, during the night attack, the Byzantines under the command of their Emperor Leo V almost completely defeated the Bulgarians.

== Sources ==
- Norwich, John (2023). The History of the Byzantine Empire: From the foundation of Constantinople to the collapse of the state. Moscow: КоЛибри. p. 249. ISBN 978-5-389-19591-2.
- Wasilewski T. Historia Bułgarii. — Wrocław: Ossolineum, 1983, p. 49. — ISBN 83-0402466-7
- Грего-Болгарские войны Sytin Military encyclopedia
