= Euphrosyne (9th century) =

Empress of the Byzantine Empire
- Tenure: c. 823–829
- Born: Euphoriana c. 790
- Died: after 836
- Spouse: Michael II
- House: Isaurian dynasty
- Father: Constantine VI
- Mother: Maria of Amnia

Euphrosyne (Greek: Εὐφροσύνη, romanized: Euphrosúnē; c. 790 – after 836), was a Byzantine empress by marriage to Michael II. She was a daughter of Byzantine emperor Constantine VI, the last representative of the Isaurian dynasty, and his empress Maria of Amnia.

== Life ==
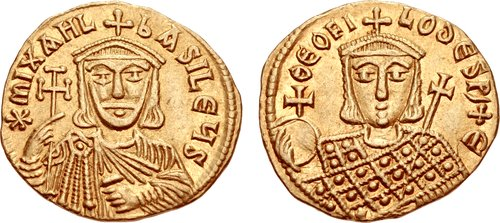
Coin depicting Euphrosyne's husband Michael II and stepson Theophilos.

In January 795, Constantine VI divorced Maria and sent her along with Euphrosyne and her sister Irene to a convent on the island of Prinkipo. The Emperor then proceeded to marry his mistress Theodote.

Euphrosyne spent her life in the monastery until c. 823. Michael II had risen to the throne three years before but his dynastic claims were at best shaky. His first wife Thekla died early in the reign and he decided to strengthen his claim by marrying Euphrosyne.

She was thus taken from her convent and entered the court as the new empress, but the highly controversial marriage proved barren. Michael II died on 2 October 829 and was succeeded by Theophilos, his son with Thekla.

As his stepmother, Euphrosyne was still able to take some decisions for the sixteen-year-old emperor. She proclaimed a bride-show for him in 830 and seem to have handpicked her stepdaughter-in-law Theodora. Soon after she retired to a monastery again. Theophanes Continuatus, in the continuation of the chronicle started by Theophanes the Confessor, indicates that Theophilos obligated her to hold on to her monastic vows, ending the religious controversy concerning her presence in court.

Theodora would go on to restore the veneration of icons in the Empire, forbidden since 815, when Leo V the Armenian restarted the Byzantine Iconoclasm. Whether Euphrosyne shared her Iconodule tendencies and picked her for it remains vague.

Euphrosyne appears twice more in the historical record. After rumours reached Constantinople that Theophilos had been killed in his campaign against Al-Afshin in Anatolia, those senators and senior officials opposed to the Emperor did not trouble themselves to discover if the news were true or not and looked for alternative candidates for the throne. Euphrosyne, aware of these political maneuvers, sent a messenger to her stepson advising him to return at once. According to later Arabic and Syriac sources the message read "The Romans who have come have reported that you are killed and they wish to appoint another emperor; come quickly." Theophilos returned.

St. Michael Synkellos records Euphrosyne offering him food, drink and clothing during his imprisonment in 836. Her offer of help to an imprisoned Iconodule again raises the question of her own religious tendencies. Her time of death is not recorded.

Royal titles
Preceded by Thekla	Byzantine Empress consort c. 823–829	Succeeded by Theodora
