= Theoktiste (740–802) =

Byzantine nun

Theoktiste or Theoctista (Greek: Θεοκτίστη, 740–802), was a politically influential Byzantine ascetic. She played an influential public role in the Byzantine Iconoclasm, as well as the controversial second marriage of emperor Constantine VI. Her biography was written by her son, Theodore the Studite.

== Life ==
Theoctista was the daughter of a Byzantine official and married her father's colleague, another wealthy official in Constantinople, Photius. She was described as very religious, strong-willed and strict, generous to the poor and ambitious for her sons. She supported the iconophile policy of Irene of Athens, and her house became a meeting place of the pro-icon party in Constantinople.

She sold most of the property of the family and moved to Bithynia, where she founded a monastery on her estate Sakkoudion, were her husband and her brother and sons became monks, while she and her daughter were the only women allowed.

She was related to Empress Theodote but protested on religious grounds to Emperor Constantine VI's divorce and remarriage to Theodote in 795, and her monastery became a center of the opposition toward it. The emperor, therefore, had her monastery dissolved and arrested her brother Plato and her son, Theodore. Theoktiste became the leader of the opposition in Constantinople, which resulted in her arrest. Her arrest gave her martyr status and was one of the factors which eased the way for the succession of Irene to the throne in 797.

After Irene's accession, Theoktiste and her family were able to open their monastery again, where Theoktiste lived another five years under extreme asceticism.
