= Theodote (empress) =

- Augusta

Empress of the Byzantine Empire
- Tenure: 795–797
- Born: c. 780
- Died: after 797
- Spouse: Constantine VI
- Issue Detail: Leo (died in infancy); Unnamed son
- Mother: Anna

Theodote (Greek: Θεοδότη, romanized: Theodoti; c. 780 – after 797) was the second empress consort of Constantine VI of the Byzantine Empire. She was a member of a distinguished family of Constantinople and her brother Sergios was mentioned as an hypatos. Their mother Anna was a sister of Theoktiste and her brother Plato. Theodote was thus a maternal first cousin of Theodore the Studite, son of Theoktiste.

== Marriage ==
By 794, Theodote served as a lady-in-waiting (koubikoularia) of Irene. Irene was the widow of Leo IV the Khazar and mother of his heir Constantine VI. Irene had served as regent from 780 to 790 and still held the title of Empress.

Constantine was married to Maria of Amnia and the imperial couple had two daughters, Euphrosyne and a younger Irene. However, according to the chronicle of Theophanes the Confessor, Constantine had turned against his first wife at some point. Theophanes attributed the deterioration of the marriage to the machinations of Irene, but the lack of a male heir following six years of marriage could also be one of the reasons. Whatever the case, Constantine took Theodote as his royal mistress.

In January 795, Constantine divorced Maria. Maria and both of their daughters were sent to a convent in the island of Prinkipo. In August 795, Theodote (then aged about fifteen) was officially betrothed to the Emperor and proclaimed an Augusta, a title Maria had never been granted. In September 795, Theodote and Constantine were married at the palace named after St. Mamas. Theodote had become the Empress consort within eight months of the removal of her predecessor.

== Empress ==
The legality of the marriage sparked a religious controversy at least since the betrothal was announced. The initial divorce had met with disapproval in circles of the Church. The remarriage while Maria was still alive was seen as an attempt for legalization of adultery.

Even supporters of the Emperor were keeping their distances. Imperial marriage ceremonies were typically performed by the Ecumenical Patriarch of Constantinople. The current Patriarch Tarasios had reluctantly consented to both the divorce and the second marriage, but refused to officiate himself. The marriage was performed by a certain Joseph, a priest of Hagia Sophia.

In the so-called "Moechian controversy" (from Greek: μοιχός, romanized: moichos, "adulterer"), her uncle Plato and her cousin Theodore, respectively the recently retired abbot of the Sakkoudion Monastery and his successor, initiated protests against the marriage and called for the excommunication of Joseph and everyone who had received communion from him. Implicitly including the emperor and his court. They seem to have voiced the sentiment of much of the monastic environment of their time.

Constantine and Theodote seem to have attempted peaceful reconciliation with their detractors for the first two years of their marriage. However all such offers were rejected and at last Constantine lost patience. Early in 797, imperial troops were sent to the Sakkoudion Monastery, and the community was dispersed. Theodore was flogged, and, together with ten other monks, banished to Thessalonica, while Plato was imprisoned in Constantinople. By that point, Constantine seems to have lost all meaningful support from the iconodule faction. The displaced Iconoclasts were already against Irene and her son since the restoration of the icons decided in the Second Council of Nicaea (787).

Irene was meanwhile organizing a powerful conspiracy against her son. The loss of support for Constantine arguably helped her efforts in finding supporters in both the court and the Church. Constantine was deposed and blinded in August, 797. His mother succeeded him.

== Retirement ==
Theodote was allowed to retire to a private palace along with her blinded husband. There are contradictory accounts on how long he survived his deposition, ranging from ten days to a decade. The residence was converted to a monastery while Theodote was still alive.

Symeon Metaphrastes identified this new monastic institution with the "monastery of Isidore", named after the patrician who had reportedly built the palace. This Isidore supposedly had left Rome with Olybrius following the Sack of Rome by Geiseric in 455. George Hamartolus reports that a few decades later Theophilos (reigned 829 – 842) converted the original building to a hostel and transferred the nuns to a new residence. Whether Theodote was still among them was not mentioned.

== Children ==
Theodote and Constantine VI had two known children:

- Leo (7 October 796 – 1 May 797). Theophanes records his dates of birth and death.
- An unnamed son, born after the deposition of his father. Mentioned in the correspondence of Theodore the Studite. Died between 802 and 808.

== Sources ==
- T. Pratsch, Theodoros Studites (759–826): zwischen Dogma und Pragma
- Lynda Garland, Byzantine Women: Varieties of Experience

Royal titles
Preceded by Maria of Amnia	Byzantine Empress consort 795–797	Succeeded by Theophano of Athens
