= Arsaber =

Arsaber (Greek: Ἀρσαβήρ, romanized: Arsabér, from Armenian Arshavir) was a Byzantine noble who attempted an unsuccessful usurpation of the Byzantine imperial throne in 808.

== Biography ==
Arsaber was a noble of Armenian origin, holding the rank of patrikios, and served as quaestor of Emperor Nikephoros I Logothetes (r. 802–811). In February 808, a group of secular and ecclesiastic officials, who were dissatisfied with Nikephoros's rule, formed a conspiracy and acclaimed Arsaber as emperor. Nikephoros, however, discovered the plot and arrested the participants, who were beaten, had their properties confiscated, and were ultimately exiled. Arsaber himself was tonsured and exiled to a monastery in Bithynia. Arsaber's daughter, Theodosia, had been married to the future Emperor Leo V the Armenian (r. 813–820). Leo, then a general and hitherto enjoying Nikephoros's favour, was exiled for a time, likely on account of this connection to Arsaber.
