= Asekretis =

Class of secretaries in the Byzantine imperial court

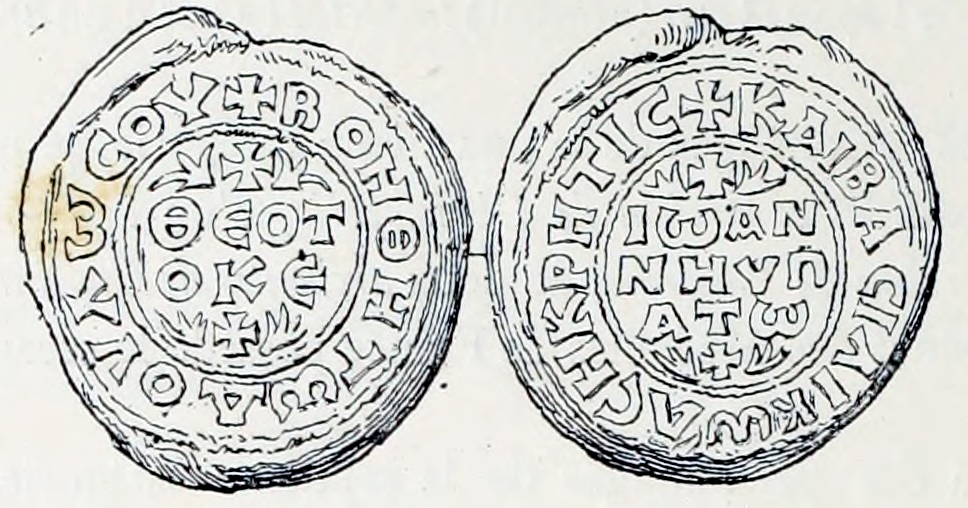
Seal of the hypatos and basilikos asekretis John (Komnenian period. Legend: + ΘΕΟΤΟΚΕ ΒΟΗΘΕΙ + ΤΩ ΔΟΥΛΩ CΟΥ + / + ΙΩΑΝΝΗ ΥΠΑΤΩ + ΚΑΙ ΒΑCΙΛΙΚΩ ΑΣΗΚΡΗΤΗ.

The term asekretis (Greek: ἀσηκρῆτις, romanized: asēkrētis, invariable form) designated a senior class of secretaries in the Byzantine imperial court in the 6th–12th centuries.

The term is derived from the Latin a secretis, and in its full form was "asekretis of the court" (ἀσηκρῆτις τῆς αὐλῆς, asēkrētis tēs aulēs). It seems to be an innovation of the 6th century, as the contemporary historian Procopius of Caesarea found it necessary to explain it to his readers. Modern scholars have sometimes assumed that it dates to the 4th century, but the only reference to it, in the acts of the Council of Chalcedon, actually dates from a 6th-century translation of the document.

The asekretis succeeded the referendarii as the senior-most members of the imperial secretariat, above the notarii. Some of them were attached to the praetorian prefectures. Seals of the office's holders survive from the 6th and 7th centuries, while a reference from the Third Council of Constantinople (680) indicates the existence of a senior asekretis who functioned as head of the class, probably the predecessor of the later protasekretis. The asekretis are attested as holding mid-level dignities, from the rank of protospatharios to spatharios and sometimes even lower. Eminent members of the class included the emperor Anastasios II (r. 715–717), and the Patriarchs of Constantinople Tarasios (784–806) and Nikephoros I (806–815).

The office continues to be mentioned until the 12th century, after which it disappears, with the generic term grammatikos taking its place.

== Sources ==
- Bury, John Bagnell (1911). The Imperial Administrative System of the Ninth Century - With a Revised Text of the Kletorologion of Philotheos. London: Oxford University Press.
- Kazhdan, Alexander (1991). "Asekretis". In Kazhdan, Alexander (ed.). The Oxford Dictionary of Byzantium. Oxford and New York: Oxford University Press. p. 204. ISBN 0-19-504652-8.
