= Count of the Tent =

Byzantine military official

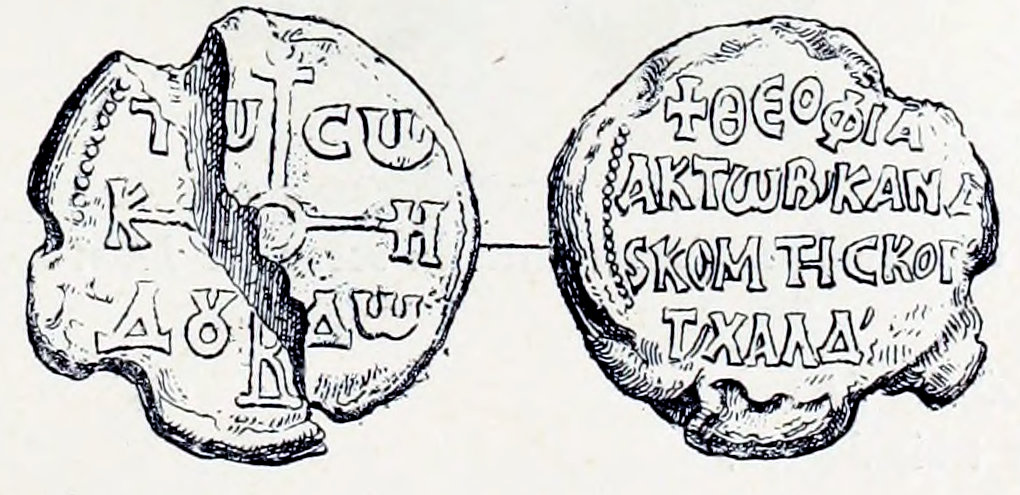
Seal of Theophylact, basilikos kandidatos and komes tes kortes of Chaldia

The Count of the Tent (Greek: κόμης της κόρτης, komēs tēs kortēs) was a Byzantine military-administrative office attested from the 8th to the early 12th centuries.

== History and functions ==
The title derives from korte, "tent". The emperor often had a Count of the Tent in his own, personal service, the most famous of whom was Michael the Amorian under Nikephoros I (r. 802–811). According to the 10th-century Emperor Constantine VII Porphyrogennetos, during Imperial campaigns through the provinces (themes), the Imperial Count of the Tent and his subordinates, the kortinarioi, were responsible for pitching the Imperial tent and assisting the Drungary of the Watch in keeping watch over the camp at night.

The Count is also attested as an official attached to the staff of a strategos, the military governor of a theme, in seals and documents from the 8th to the early 12th centuries; on seals, the province where he served is often denoted. The office's functions are not clear, but based on his role in narrative sources the Count seems to have been mostly involved with police and judicial matters; Nicolas Oikonomides views him as "a sort of chief of staff". They seem to have borne mid-level court ranks such as spatharios and kandidatos.

== Sources ==
- Bury, J. B. (1911). The Imperial Administrative System of the Ninth Century – With a Revised Text of the Kletorologion of Philotheos. London: Oxford University Press. OCLC 1046639111.
- Kazhdan, Alexander (1991). "Komes tes kortes". In Kazhdan, Alexander (ed.). The Oxford Dictionary of Byzantium. Oxford and New York: Oxford University Press. p. 1139. ISBN 0-19-504652-8.
- Oikonomides, Nicolas (1972). Les Listes de Préséance Byzantines des IXe et Xe Siècles (in French). Paris: Editions du Centre National de la Recherche Scientifique.
