= Maria of Amnia =

Empress of the Byzantine Empire
- Tenure: 788–795
- Born: c. 770; Amnia, Paphlagonia (now Central Anatolia, Anatolia, Turkey)
- Died: after 823
- Spouse: Constantine VI
- Issue Detail: Euphrosyne, Byzantine Empress
- Mother: Hypatia

Maria of Amnia (Greek: Μαρία, 770 – after 823) was a Byzantine empress, the first wife of Constantine VI. Through her mother Hypatia, Maria was a granddaughter of Saint Philaretos, a magnate from the Armeniakon Theme known for his charitable activities, a relation mentioned in his hagiography. Maria was born in Amnia, Paphlagonia.

== Empress ==
In 788, Maria was one of thirteen candidates in the earliest recorded bride-show. The bride-show had been ordered by the Empress-regent Irene in search of a suitable bride for her son Constantine VI. Constantine was previously betrothed to Rotrude, daughter of Charlemagne and Hildegard, but Irene had called off the engagement.

Maria was chosen primarily by Irene. Constantine and Staurakios, a eunuch who served as the logothetes tou dromou, were also reportedly involved in the presentation of the candidates. However whether they influenced the choice is unstated.

The marriage took place in November, 788, and was recorded in the chronicle of Theophanes the Confessor. The marriage lasted for about six years and resulted in two daughters. Theophanes records that Constantine had turned against his first wife at some point. Theophanes attributed the deterioration of the marriage to the machinations of Irene. The lack of a male heir following six years of marriage could also be one of the reasons.

In 794, Constantine had found a mistress in the person of Theodote, a cubicularius (lady-in-waiting) of his mother. In January, 795, Constantine divorced Maria. Maria and both of their daughters were sent to a convent in the island of Prinkipo. In September, 795, Constantine and Theodote were wed.

The initial divorce had met with disapproval in circles of the Eastern Orthodox Church. The remarriage while Maria was still alive was seen as an attempt for legalization of adultery. The legality of the second marriage sparked a religious controversy, the so-called "Moechian Controversy" (from the Greek moichos, "adulterer"). However Maria is not recorded as involved with any of the conflicts of the time.

She remained a nun for the rest of her life. She is last mentioned c. 823. Her daughter Euphrosyne was taken from their convent to marry Michael II (reigned 820 – 829). She protested the decision to no effect. Her protestation is mentioned in the correspondence of Theodore the Studite. The year of her death is not known.

== Children ==
Maria and Constantine VI had two daughters:

- Euphrosyne (c. 790 – after 836). Married Michael II.
- Irene. Became a nun in 795. Last mentioned alive in 796.

Royal titles
Preceded by Irene of Athens	Byzantine Empress consort 788–795	Succeeded by Theodote
