= Michael II =

Byzantine emperor from 820 to 829

- Emperor and Autocrat of the Romans
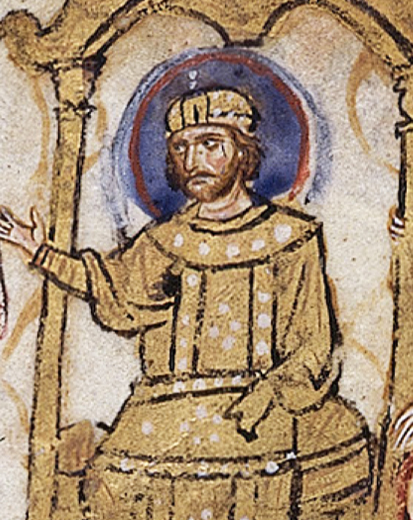
- Michael II, from the Madrid Skylitzes

Byzantine emperor
- Reign: 25 December 820 – 2 October 829
- Coronation: 25 December 820
- Predecessor: Leo V
- Successor: Theophilos
- Co-emperor: Theophilos
- Rival: Thomas the Slav (821–823)
- Born: 770; Amorium, Phrygia, Anatolic Theme
- Died: 2 October 829 (aged 59)
- Consort: Thekla; Euphrosyne
- Issue: Theophilos
- Dynasty: Amorian dynasty

Michael II (Greek: Μιχαήλ, Mikhaḗl; 770 – 2 October 829), called the Amorian (ὁ ἐξ Ἀμορίου, ho ex Amoríou) and the Stammerer (ὁ Τραυλός, o Travlós or ὁ Ψελλός, o Psellós), reigned as Byzantine emperor from 25 December 820 to his death on 2 October 829, the first ruler of the Amorian dynasty.

Born in Amorium, Michael was a soldier, rising to high rank along with his colleague Leo V the Armenian (r. 813–820). He helped Leo overthrow and take the place of Emperor Michael I Rhangabe. However, after they fell out Leo sentenced Michael to death. Michael then masterminded a conspiracy which resulted in Leo's assassination at Christmas in 820. Immediately he faced the long revolt of Thomas the Slav, which almost cost him his throne and was not completely quelled until spring 824. The later years of his reign were marked by two major military disasters that had long-term effects: the beginning of the Muslim conquest of Sicily, and the loss of Crete to Andalusian Arab pirates. Domestically, he supported and strengthened the resumption of official iconoclasm, which had begun again under Leo V.

== Early life ==
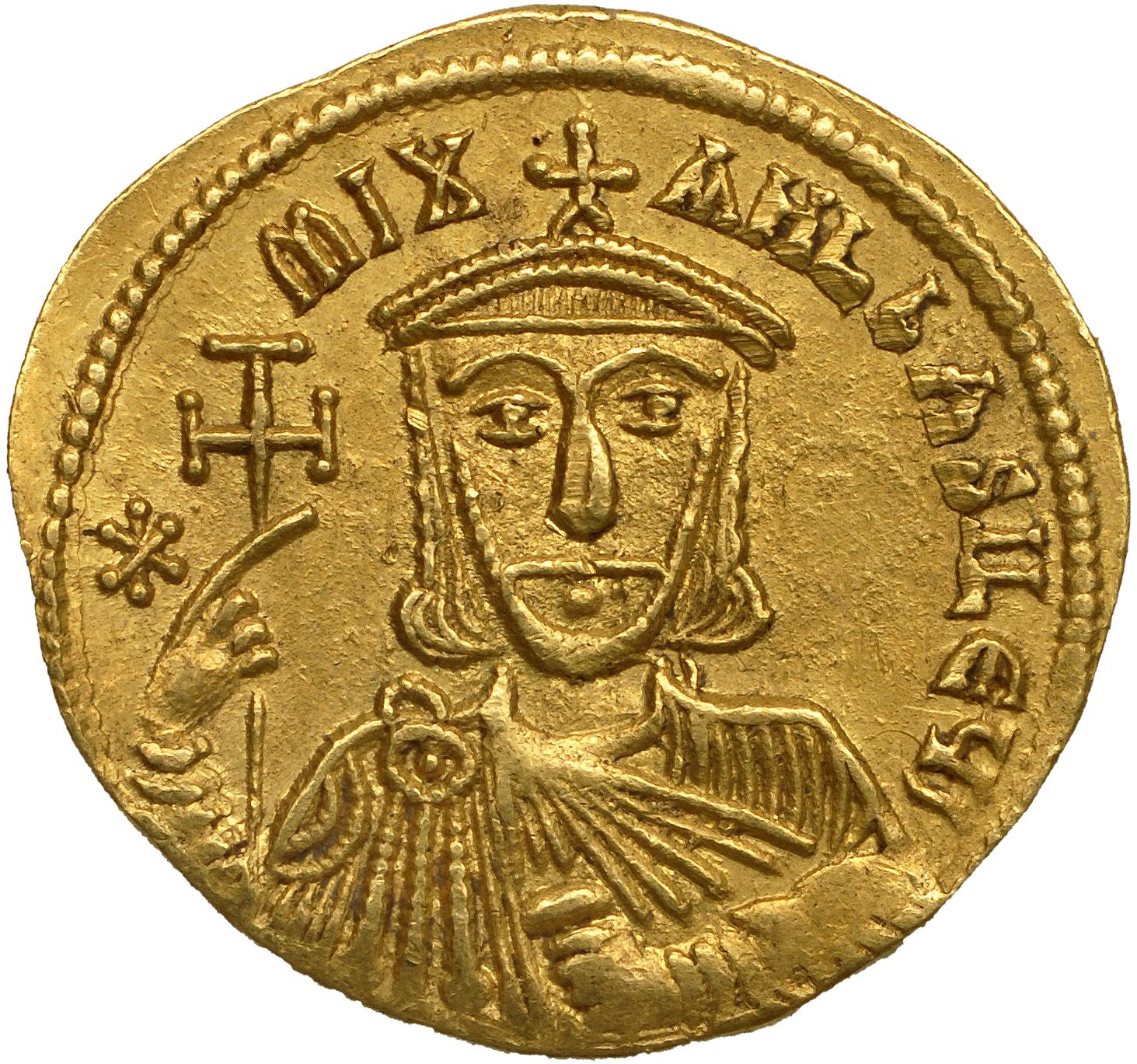
Gold solidus of Michael II

Michael was born c. 770 in Amorium, in Phrygia, into a Cappadocian family of professional peasant-soldiers who received land from the government for their military service. They may have been members of the sect of the Athinganoi.

Michael first rose to prominence as a close aide (spatharios) of the general Bardanes Tourkos, alongside his future antagonists Leo the Armenian and Thomas the Slav. He married Bardanes' daughter Thekla, while Leo married another daughter. Michael and Leo abandoned Bardanes shortly after he rebelled against Emperor Nikephoros I in 803, and they were rewarded with higher military commands: Michael was named the Emperor's Count of the Tent. Michael was instrumental in Leo's overthrow of Michael I Rhangabe in 813, after Rangabe's repeated military defeats against the Bulgarians. Under Leo V, Michael was appointed to command the elite tagma of the Excubitors.

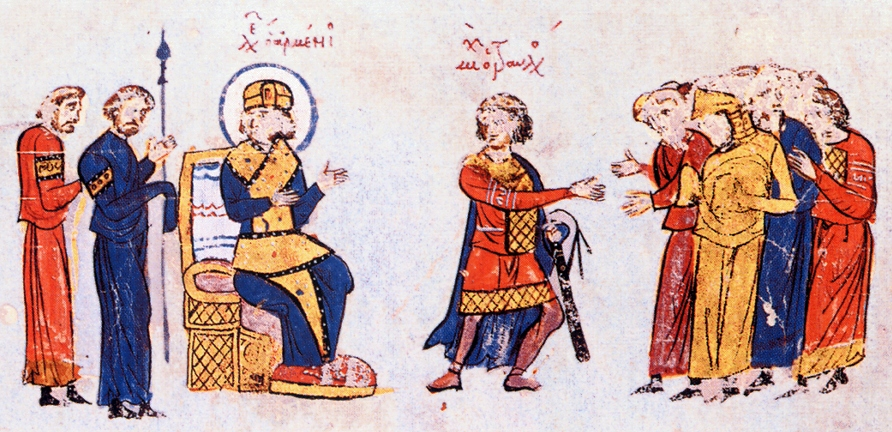
Michael the Amorian having an argument with Leo V

Thekla and Michael had only one known son, Theophilos (813 – 20 January 842). The existence of a daughter called Helena is possible but there is a contradiction between different sources. Helena is known as the wife of Theophobos, a patrician executed in 842 for conspiring to gain the throne for himself. George Hamartolos and Theophanes report him marrying the sister of the Empress Theodora. Joseph Genesius records Theophobos marrying the sister of the Emperor Theophilos. Whether Helena was sister or sister-in-law to Theophilos is thus unclear.

Michael became disgruntled with Leo V when he divorced Michael's sister-in-law. In late 820, agents of the Postal Logothete uncovered a plot led by Michael to overthrow Leo, who then imprisoned Michael and sentenced him to death by burning. Empress consort Theodosia secured a postponement of the execution until after Christmas. This allowed Michael to rally undetected plotters to assassinate Leo on Christmas morning in the palace chapel and castrate his sons to prevent the continuation of his dynasty. Michael was immediately proclaimed emperor, while still wearing prison chains on his legs. Later the same day, he was crowned by Patriarch Theodotus I of Constantinople.

== Reign ==
In his internal policy, Michael II supported iconoclasm, but he tacitly encouraged reconciliation with the iconodules, whom he generally stopped persecuting, allowing those exiled by Emperor Leo V the Armenian to return. These included the former patriarch Nikephoros, Anthony the Confessor, and Theodore the Stoudite, who failed, however, to persuade the emperor to abandon iconoclasm. Michael also did not restore the exiled iconodules to their previous positions. Theodore also requested permission to restore icons, resume relations with the bishop of Rome and recognise him as the head of all churches and therefore arbiter of disputes. Michael allowed iconodules to follow their conscience outside of Constantinople but did not make any further concessions, refusing to change imperial policy and banning discussion of the Council of Hieria (754), Second Council of Nicaea (787) and Council of Constantinople (815). When Patriarch Theodotos died in 821, Michael appointed the iconoclast Antony, bishop of Syllaion, against the aspirations of the iconodules.

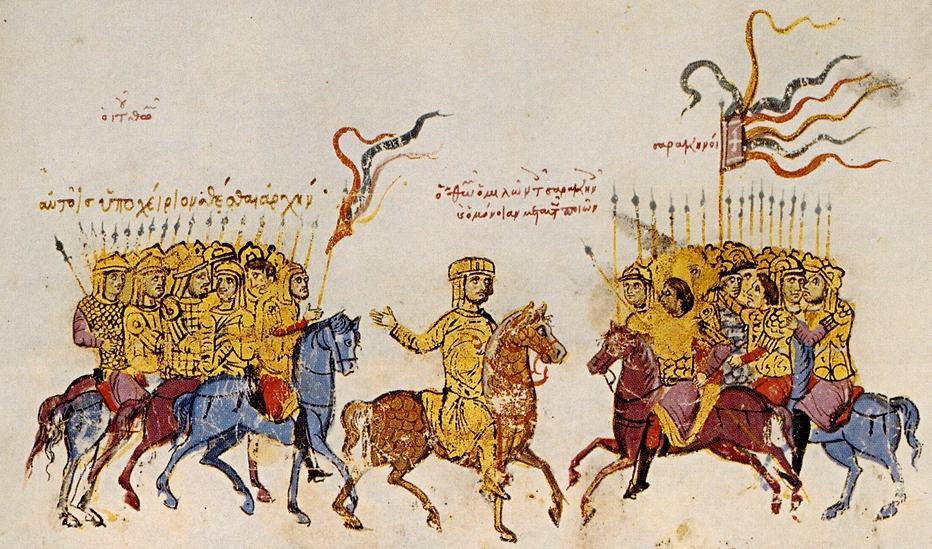
Thomas the Slav forming an alliance with the Abbasids

=== Revolt of Thomas the Slav: 821–823 ===
Michael's accession prompted his former comrade-in-arms Thomas the Slav to set himself up as rival emperor in Anatolia to avenge Leo V. He had been made the tourmarchēs of the Foederati (a command in the Anatolic Theme) by Leo, and so bore at least nominal allegiance to him. The stratēgos of Sicily, Gregory, also proclaimed allegiance to Leo against Michael but was killed by soldiers under the tourmarchēs Euphemios which secured the loyalty of the Sicilian fleet to Michael. Thomas was supported by the Bucellarian, Paphlagonian and Cibyrrhaeot themes, while Michael held the European part of the Empire including the Opsikion (commanded by his relative Katakylas), Thracesian, Armeniac and Chaldian themes. To strengthen his position, he won the support of iconodules by stopping persecution, recalling exiled bishops and offering to reinstate Patriarch Nikephoros I of Constantinople if he ignored the iconoclast controversy, which he refused to do.

In his quest for support, Thomas presented himself as a champion of the poor, reduced taxation, and concluded an alliance with al-Ma'mun of the Abbasid Caliphate, having himself crowned as emperor by the iconodule Greek Patriarch of Antioch, Job, in the Church of Cassian, then in Abbasid territory, taking the imperial name Constantine. Having amassed a large army, perhaps of 80,000 men as some sources report, Thomas marched into Thrace, winning the support of the theme as well as the Armeniacs and Chaldians. He besieged the capital in December 821. Although Thomas did not win over all the Anatolian themes, he secured the support of the naval theme and their ships, allowing him to intensify his siege of Constantinople. At this point, Michael's usurpation was prevented only by the Walls of Constantinople.

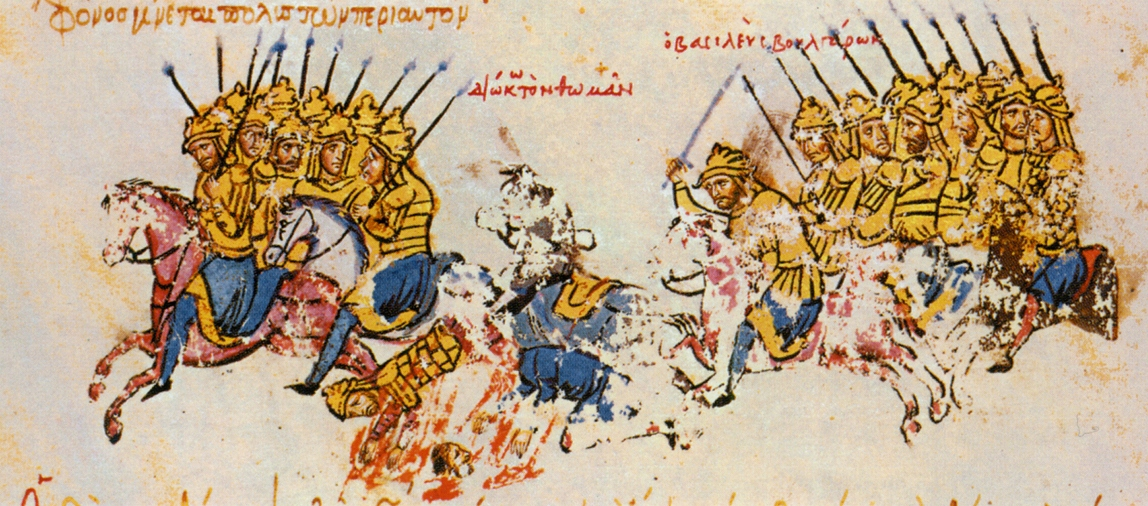
Thomas the Slav is defeated by the army of Omurtag of Bulgaria.

In summer 822, the imperial fleet was able to destroy the rebel fleet with Greek fire. The primary sources disagree over whether a large Bulgar force under Khan Omurtag of Bulgaria was acting on Michael's request or of its own accord, nevertheless in spring 823 it marched against Thomas, forcing him to lift his siege of Constantinople. The Bulgars defeated Thomas and many of his men began to desert, leading him to retreat to Arcadiopolis. Michael besieged Thomas in Arcadiopolis and starved him out, leading his supporters to hand him over to the Emperor, who put him to death. The last outbreak of resistance was put down in Anatolia in spring 824. By the end of 823, Michael's power was firmly established and he had negotiated peace with the Bulgars despite their raiding and pillaging in Thrace during Thomas' revolt.

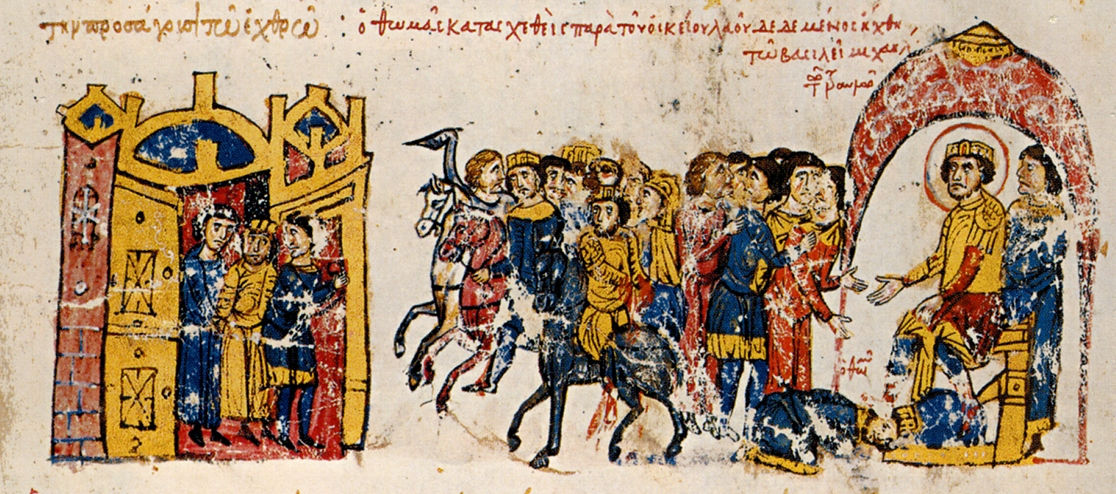
Michael II successfully captures Arcadiopolis, leading to the surrender of Thomas the Slav.

==== Aftermath ====
The warfare damaged the rural economy, in particular the region around Constantinople, and many Dalmatian coastal towns cast off imperial authority, which was not reinstated until the reign of Basil I (r. 867–886). Michael tried to reunite the Empire by pardoning many of Thomas' supporters and marrying the daughter of Constantine VI and Maria of Amnia, Euphrosyne, of the illustrious iconoclast Isaurian dynasty, although she herself was an iconodule. The marriage thus gave Michael's rule a degree of legitimacy, but it caused some outrage since his first wife, Thekla had only recently died, and Euphrosyne was a nun. Nevertheless, the marriage helped to stabilise his authority and position.

Michael attempted a reconciliation of the iconoclast controversy with Theodore and Nikephoros but they remained determined in their rejection of any compromise between iconoclasm and iconodulia. Theodore insisted that the matter should be resolved by a council presided over by Nikephoros or by the pope as a final arbiter. Nikephoros wrote his Refutation of the Acts of the 815 Council of Constantinople. Michael denied that the pope had any authority to intervene in the Eastern Church, so when the abbot Methodios, later Patriarch of Constantinople, arrived in Constantinople with a definition of orthodoxy from Pope Paschal I, he was considered a traitor and imprisoned. This was the only case of oppression of iconodules by Michael recorded in primary sources, and he generally pursued a benevolent policy, hoping he would be able to convert iconodules through dialogue. He wrote to the Carolingian Emperor, Louis the Pious (r. 814–840), defending the iconoclast position as represented in the synod of 815, and affirming belief in the veneration of relics. He gave an account of Thomas the Slav's revolt and appealed to Louis to suppress eastern monks who were spreading anti-Byzantine propaganda in Rome. He also expressed his disapproval of certain practices associated with iconodules including the mixing of fragments of icons with the Eucharist, the use of icons as altar tables and as sponsors in baptism or tonsuring. This is corroborated by other reports of the extensive cult of images which had developed by the ninth century. Another case of Byzantine diplomacy with the Franks was the gift of the manuscript of Pseudo-Dionysius the Areopagite to Louis' court in 827, which was purposefully chosen because Louis' adviser Hilduin, abbot of Saint-Denis, chose Dionysius as his abbey's patron saint.

=== Campaigns against the Arabs ===
In 824, Michael sent a fleet to raid the Syrian coast, while personally leading an army to sack Sozopetra. Caliph al-Ma'mun mounted a combined land and naval raid in 825 in response to this affront. While the Abbasid fleet scored some success in extorting a ransom from the garrison of attaleia after blockading it, the armies invading by land suffered defeats at the hands of Byzantine forces (possibly led by Michael II in person). Ultimately neither side secured a decisive victory leaving the eastern frontier in a hostile stalemate.

Michael inherited a seriously weakened military and was unable to prevent the conquest of Crete in 826 by 10,000 Arab pirates from al-Andalus (who had 40 ships), or to recover the island with an expedition. The pirates had been exiled by the Umayyad emir of al-Andalus and captured Alexandria in 825 but were driven out. Crete was only recovered in 961, and until then remained a base for raiding parties into the Aegean and eastern Mediterranean. In 828, the Cibyrrhaeot navy and army achieved some successes, but was destroyed in a surprise attack and the stratēgos of the theme was killed. However in 829, the imperial fleet succeeded in driving the pirates out of the Cyclades.

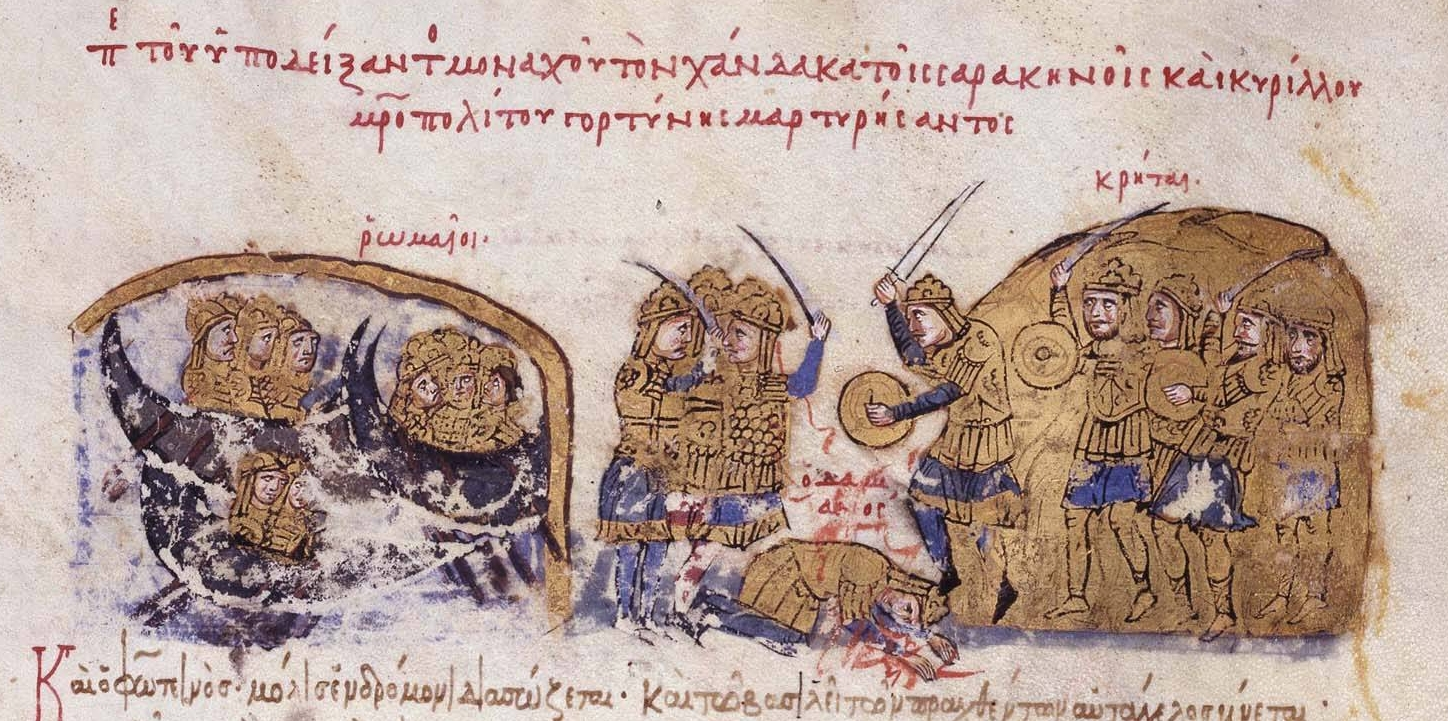
Andalusian pirates land on the island of Crete and swiftly conquer it.

Sicily lacked both a dominant political and culture centre, like Ravenna, Rome or Naples, and an autonomous local military elite, so its population were either divided or reacted passively during the crises of the 820s. Discontent began with the revolt of Thomas the Slav, and developed with Michael's attempt to raise taxation in 826. An anti-imperial faction arose, led by the tourmarchēs of Sicily, Euphemios, who had led successful raids in North Africa. In 827, the stratēgos Constantine tried to arrest him, although his motive was unclear. It was likely in response to Euphemios' disloyalty, but later legends report that he wanted to punish Euphemios for abducting his niece from a nunnery and forcing her into marriage. In any event, word of Constantine's intention reached Euphemios when he was raiding on the North African shore, and caused him to initiate a rebellion, seizing Syracuse, proclaiming himself emperor and then killing the stratēgos Constantine after defeating him at Catania. Some of Euphemios' supporters deserted him for the imperial government, and he was defeated by another garrison commander, which forced him to flee to the Aghlabid emir, Ziyadat Allah I of Ifriqiya, who recognised his title and gave him a fleet. In June 827, a predominantly Arab force landed on the west of the island at Mazara, beginning an invasion. The Byzantines fared poorly at first, retaining control only of a few strongholds and Syracuse. With the death of Euphemios and the arrival of a new stratēgos in 829 came a series of successes which secured imperial authority by the end of Michael's reign.

=== Later years ===
Michael maintained his policy of compromise and neutrality between iconoclasm and iconodulia until his death, and was supported throughout by Patriarch Antony. In October 829, Michael ordered the release of prisoners, reflecting his moderate policy. On 2 October, he died from kidney failure. He was succeeded peacefully by his son Theophilos and Theophilos's stepmother Euphrosyne, since Theophilos was only seventeen years old.

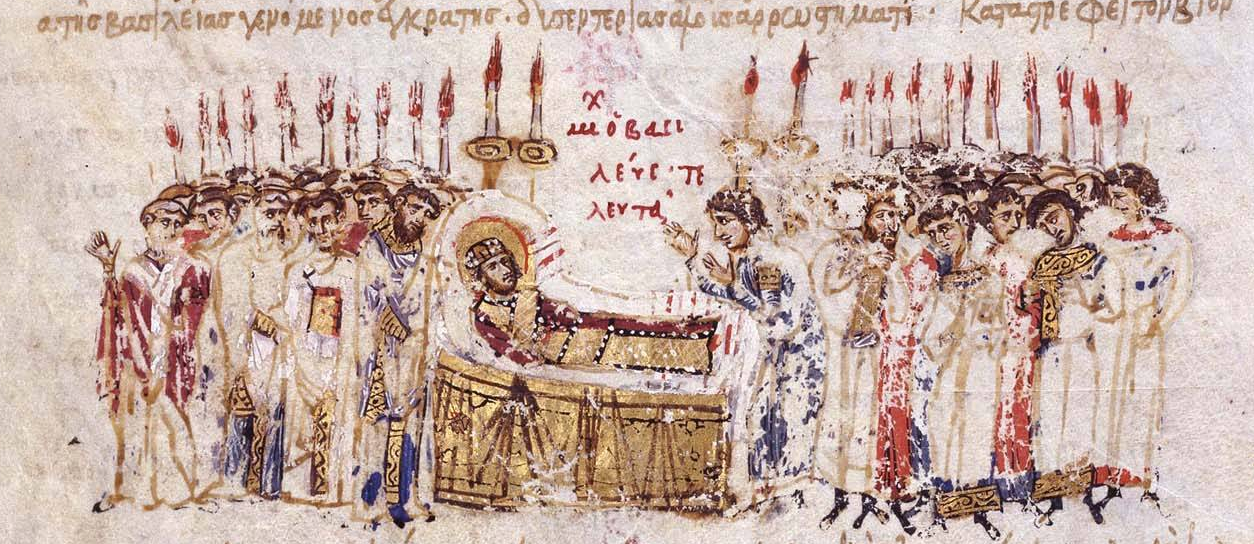
The death of Michael II as depicted in the Madrid Skylitzes

== Assessment and legacy ==
Because of his iconoclasm, Michael was not popular among the clergy, who depicted him as an ignorant and poorly educated peasant, but he was a competent statesman and administrator. Empress Theodora (r. 842–856) defended her husband Theophilos, which mitigated the damnatio memoriae against him and his father Michael, nevertheless the later iconodule sources were highly critical of them. The civil war, which was the most ferocious since the Heraclian revolt (608–610), gravely weakened the imperial government, which saw the beginning of the century-long struggle over Sicily with the Aghlabids and the loss of Crete to Arab pirates from al-Andalus. Both islands became bases for future raids of the coasts of southern Italy and in the Aegean, as well as the conquest of Bari in 842. However, by the end of Michael's reign he had begun a restoration of the Byzantine military. The system of government and military built by Michael enabled the Empire under his grandson Michael III to gain ascendancy in their struggles with the Abbasids and to withstand all the vicissitudes of Byzantine palace life. Michael II's direct descendants, the Amorian dynasty followed by the so-called Macedonian dynasty, ruled the Empire for more than two centuries, inaugurating the Byzantine Renaissance of the 9th and 10th centuries.

Although he arranged the assassination of Leo V, Michael continued with his form of iconoclasm in what came to be known as the "second" Byzantine iconoclasm. This iconoclasm was less intransigent than the first; iconodules were not accused of idolatry and images that were suspended high up (and thus unable to be venerated) were permitted to remain in churches. Nevertheless, many iconodule clergymen remained staunchly opposed, especially Patriarch Nikephoros I of Constantinople who was deposed by Leo V but remained active in polemics against imperial authority during Michael's reign.

== See also ==
- List of Byzantine emperors

== Footnotes ==
Michael II Phrygian Dynasty Born: 770 Died: 2 October 829
Regnal titles
Preceded by Leo V	Byzantine emperor 25 December 820 – 2 October 829	Succeeded by Theophilos
Political offices
Vacant Title last held by Leo V	Roman consul 820	Vacant Title next held by Theophilos
