= Leo V the Armenian =

Byzantine emperor from 813 to 820

- Emperor of the Romans
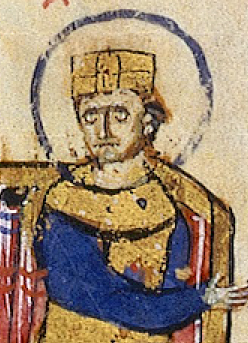
- Depiction of Leo from the 12th century Madrid Skylitzes.

Byzantine emperor
- Reign: 12 July 813 – 25 December 820
- Coronation: 12 July 813
- Predecessor: Michael I
- Successor: Michael II
- Co-emperor: Constantine
- Born: c. 775
- Died: 25 December 820 (aged c. 45)
- Consort: Theodosia
- Issue: Constantine; Basil; Gregory; Theodosios; Anna
- Father: Bardas

Leo V the Armenian (Greek: Λέων ὁ Ἀρμένιος, Léōn ho Arménios; c. 775 – 25 December 820) was the Byzantine emperor from 813 to 820. He is chiefly remembered for ending the decade-long war with the Bulgars, as well as initiating the second period of Byzantine iconoclasm.

A senior general of Armenian origin, Leo distinguished himself under Nikephoros I and Michael I Rhangabe, eventually becoming the stratēgos of the Anatolic Theme. Taking advantage of Michael's defeat at the Battle of Versinikia, he forced the emperor to abdicate in his favour. He was able to withhold the blockade of Constantinople by Krum of Bulgaria and, after Krum's death, concluded a 30-year peace with his successor Omurtag.

In 815, Leo deposed Patriarch Nikephoros and reinstituted iconoclasm. He was assassinated by supporters of Michael the Amorian, one of his most trusted generals, who succeeded him on the throne in 820.

== Background ==
Leo was born c. 775 in Umayyad Arminiya, the son of the patrician Bardas, who was of Armenian descent. According to Theophanes Continuatus, Leo was also of Assyrian/Syrian descent. In his youth he fled with his family to the Byzantine Empire and enrolled in the army of the Anatolic Theme. In 802, the general Bardanes Tourkos took over the theme and married one of his daughters to Leo. When Bardanes rebelled, Leo deserted to Emperor Nikephoros I who promoted him to the position of stratēgos of the Armeniac Theme. In 811, when Nikephoros was planning his major campaign against the Bulgars (which was to end disastrously), Arab raiders captured and destroyed the city of Euchaita in the Armeniac Theme—a humiliating defeat in which the salaries of the thematic units were also lost. Nikephoros blamed this on Leo and exiled him. Punishment also included deprivation of his military rank, beating and hair cutting. However, a modern scholar suggests this "Leo" mentioned in the contemporary sources as being punished by Nikephoros was not the same as the later Emperor Leo.

== Reign ==
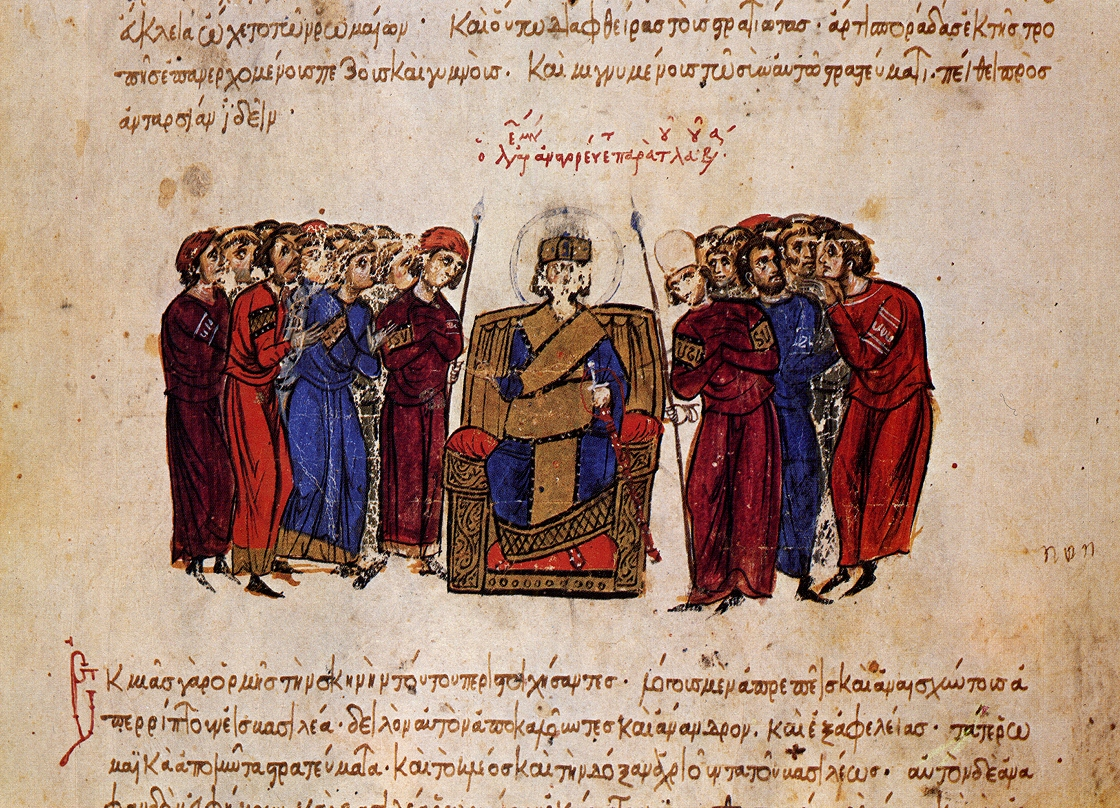
Proclamation of Leo as emperor.

Recalled by Michael I Rhangabe in 811, Leo became governor of the Anatolic Theme and conducted himself well in a war against the Arabs in 812, defeating the forces of the Cilician thughur under Thabit ibn Nasr. Leo survived the Battle of Versinikia in 813 by abandoning the battlefield, but nevertheless took advantage of this defeat to force the abdication of Michael I in his favor on 11 July 813. It was at this time that people assembled at the tomb of Constantine V, an emperor who was victorious against the Bulgars, and cried out to it: "Arise and help the state which is perishing!"

In a diplomatic move, Leo wrote a letter to Patriarch Nikephoros in order to reassure him of his orthodoxy (Nikephoros being obviously afraid of a possible iconoclast revival). A further step in preventing future usurpations was the castration of Michael I's sons. One month later, during his entrance to the Palace quarter, he kneeled before the icon of Christ at the Chalke Gate, which was erected by Empress Irene.

Leo inherited a precarious situation. Within a week of his coronation, Khan Krum of Bulgaria blockaded both Adrianople and Constantinople by land. He agreed to negotiate in person with Krum but used the opportunity to attempt to have him assassinated. The stratagem failed, enraging Krum who sacked the suburbs of Constantinople and towns in southern Thrace. However, he abandoned his siege of the capital, and withdrew to capture and depopulate Adrianople. With this moment of respite, Leo divorced his allegedly adulterous wife and married the daughter of the patrikios Arsaber, the well-regarded Armenian noblewoman Theodosia, crowning her first son, the ten-year-old Symbatios, co-emperor, and renaming him Constantine, recalling the militarily successful iconoclast emperors of the eighth century, Leo III the Isaurian and Constantine V. In 814, Krum sacked Arcadiopolis and other Thracian towns, and planned a full-scale siege of Constantinople, but died of a stroke before he could begin, causing the Bulgar threat to finally recede.

=== The beginning of the second iconoclasm ===
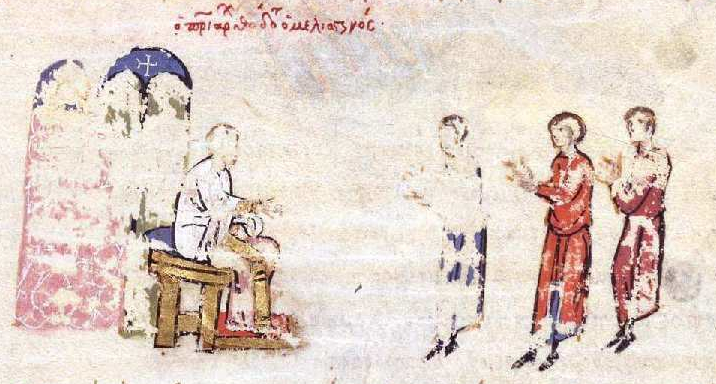
Patriarch Theodotus I reinstates iconoclasm at the Council of Constantinople.

The motives for the second iconoclasm appear to be more straightforward than in the first, and are much less contested among scholars. Like Emperor Philippikos' (r. 711–713) re-introduction of monothelitism in 711, Leo's adoption of iconoclasm was a strategy for imperial survival and a means of bolstering imperial authority (although it is noted that pragmatism and genuine conviction are not mutually exclusive, i.e., Leo may have had genuinely iconoclastic convictions). And just as Patriarch Nikephoros I and Theodore the Stoudite opposed imperial intervention in dogmatic matters, so too did Maximos the Confessor oppose the monothelite policies of Constans II (r. 641–688). In turn, Constans and Leo appealed to the legacy of Constantine the Great in convoking the First Council of Nicaea, and believed their actions were only a re-assertion of this legitimate imperial authority in spiritual matters.

Leo informed his advisers of his opinion that recent emperors had suffered defeat because of their veneration of icons (or iconodulia), unlike the iconoclast emperors Leo III and Constantine V who were victorious against the Arabs and Bulgars. He appointed a theological commission led by the monk John the Grammarian (later Patriarch of Constantinople John VII). When called to comment, the iconodule Patriarch Nikephoros I of Constantinople rejected the report and argued that the biblical passages quoted as condemning iconodulia were not dealing with "holy images" but with idols. Leo asked the commission to produce a more carefully researched document, and enlisted the help of a major bishop, Antony, later Patriarch of Constantinople from 821. In the second document, the commission stated that, since the military blamed their defeats by the Bulgars on iconodulia, a compromise must be sought in which only images hanging low in churches (which are therefore able to be venerated) would be removed, but Nikephoros resisted again. Leo asked Nikephoros to provide biblical proof-texts for iconodulia but he appealed instead to the notion of the long-standing tradition of iconodulia. Leo then proposed a debate with the commission, but Nikephoros refused to participate. While Leo was attempting to present himself as a just arbitrator of a debate, rather than as a tyrant imposing iconoclasm for secular reasons (as was the characterisation of many iconodule accounts), debate among clergy only resulted in a stalemate. Some soldiers of the imperial guard threw stones and mud at the icon of Christ over the Chalke Gate, shouting iconoclastic slogans, prompting Leo to have it replaced with a cross.

This caused alarm among the clergy who met in the patriarchal palace on Christmas Eve 814. Patriarch Nikephoros refuted the document produced by the commission and had the clergy sign a pledge to oppose iconoclasm with their lives. The next day, Leo requested the iconodule clergy to engage in a debate with the commission, and kissed a small icon to demonstrate his desire for compromise. The influential iconodule abbot, Theodore the Stoudite, asked the Emperor not to involve himself in theological matters. After several weeks of correspondence and attempts by Leo to persuade clergy of the compromise proposal, Nikephoros remained unwavering in his views. At the beginning of Lent, he once again refused to discuss the issue and was deposed and exiled. Leo appointed the layman iconoclast Theodotos I, who held a synod to overturn the Second Council of Nicaea (787) and reaffirm the Council of Hieria (754) as the seventh ecumenical council. The Acts of the Council of Constantinople (815) differ from those of Hieria in that they do not charge the iconodules with idolatry, but rather "folly" and "recklessness": "we determine that the making of images is neither venerable nor useful, but we refrain from calling them idols, because even in evil exist different degrees". The central argument was that holy images were unsuitable if placed in areas that would implicitly or explicitly earn them the devotion and adoration which is due to God alone. Empress Irene was criticised for introducing the veneration of images, which are said to circumscribe the uncircumscribable and separate Christ's humanity from his divinity. In this sense, images are also called "falsely-named" in that they do not truly represent what they are said to, since they do not share in the essence of the person depicted. Images are also not said to be endowed with divine grace.

Leo's compromise policy resulted in great success, and Theodore of Stoudion reports in a letter that virtually the whole clergy of Constantinople adopted the imperial position, along with many bishops and laymen throughout the Empire. Those who refused to take communion with Patriarch Theodotos were forced into exile, and opponents of iconoclasm were often sentenced to flogging. However, Theodore also refers to "orthodox" churches which commemorated the name of the iconoclast Patriarch but still practiced the veneration of icons. The Emperor seized the properties of iconodules and monasteries, such as the rich Monastery of Stoudios, exiling Theodore the Stoudite. He also exiled other bishops that opposed him such as Anthony the Confessor and Theophanes the Confessor.

Leo likely realised that it was impossible to force everyone to agree with him, and so, similar to Constans II, was less concerned with convincing his opponents of iconoclasm than with convincing them to compromise and not pursue the matter further. In other words, he was more interested in ecclesiastical unity rather than strict iconoclasm. For example, in the Life of Nicetas of Medikion, it is reported that Patriarch Theodotos gave communion to iconodule monks while they were proclaiming "Anathema to those who do not venerate the icon of Christ". Icons were not tolerated in prominent public spaces but were allowed in private, so long as people recognised the iconoclast Patriarch.

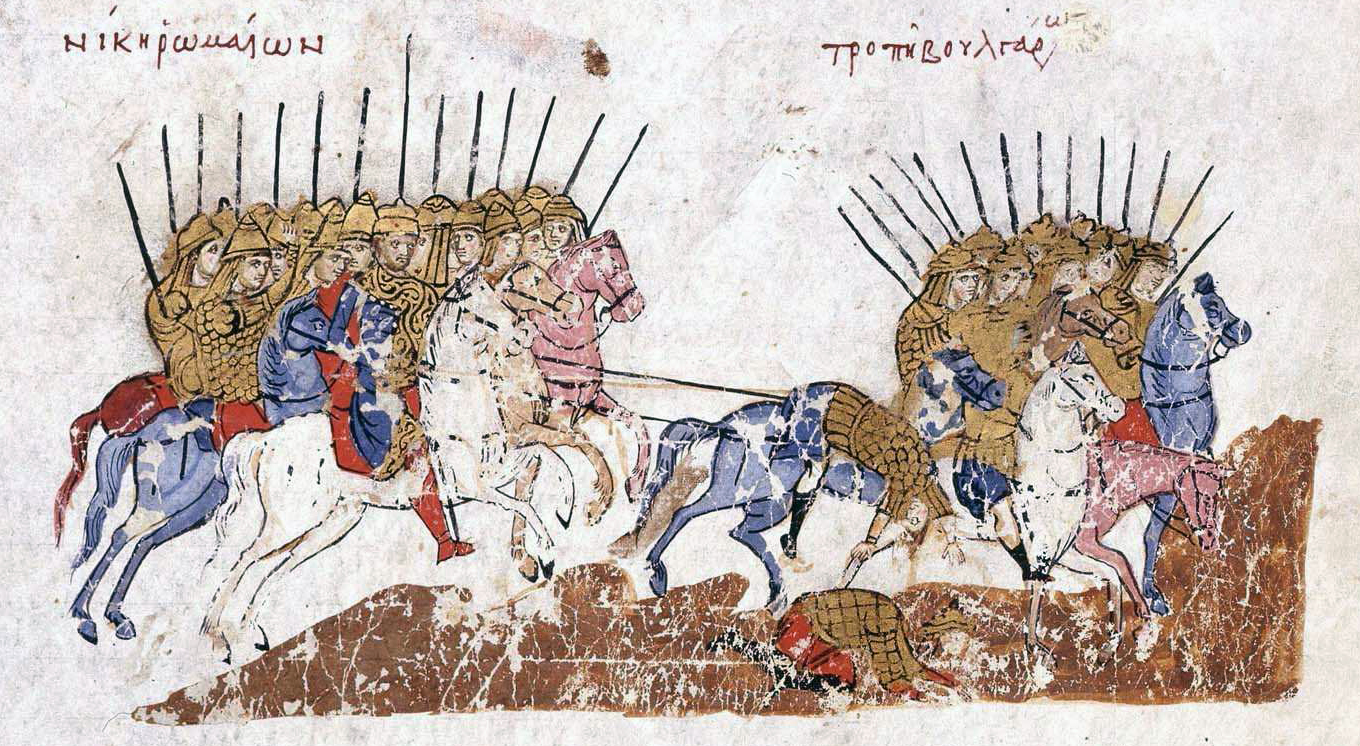
The Byzantines crush the Bulgars near Mesembria.

=== Later years ===
Shortly after the reinstitution of iconoclasm, the new Khan of Bulgaria, Omurtag, executed his Byzantine captives who refused to renounce Christianity, raided Thrace and ignored an imperial embassy, forcing Leo to fight. In the Battle of Mesembria of spring 816, Leo marched to the environs of Mesembria (Nesebar), camping near the Bulgars, pretending to flee and then ambushing them as they pursued him. He decisively defeated the Bulgar army and raided Bulgar territory, then concluding a 30-year peace treaty with Omurtag which restored the frontier of 780. According to some sources, Krum participated in the battle and abandoned the battlefield heavily injured.

While Leo was successful on the Bulgar front, relations with the Franks and the Papacy were difficult. Theodotos attempted to establish friendly relations with Pope Paschal I (817–824) but was rebuffed. Theodore the Stoudite pre-empted these efforts through his correspondence with Paschal beforehand, in which he criticised the iconoclast patriarch and directly appealed to the papacy to restore orthodoxy in the Byzantine Empire. Leo then worked to consolidate the Empire by rebuilding the Thracesian and Macedonian Themes. In 817, he sent fleets to raid the weakened Abbasid Caliphate and led an army to retake the frontier fortress of Kamachon which was lost under Constantine VI. In 818, the Rus' raided the Empire for the first time, specifically the northern coast of Anatolia, which Leo responded to by reinforcing the Armeniac Theme with naval squadrons. There was also mounting underground opposition to Leo's reign and iconoclasm especially among monastic communities, one of the leaders of which was Theodore the Stoudite. In 820, Leo uncovered and punished a conspiracy against him. Nevertheless, it appeared to Leo, his iconoclast supporters and even some iconodules that the Empire was now in God's favour with the reinstitution of iconoclasm, which had coincided with victory over the Bulgars as it had with Constantine V. Even sources vehemently hostile to Leo (e.g., Theophanes Continuatus and Patriarch Nikephoros) acknowledge his competence in managing state affairs. Although, as with all iconoclast emperors, his actions and intentions cannot be easily reconstructed due to the extreme bias of the iconodule sources (there are no surviving contemporary iconoclast sources of any kind).

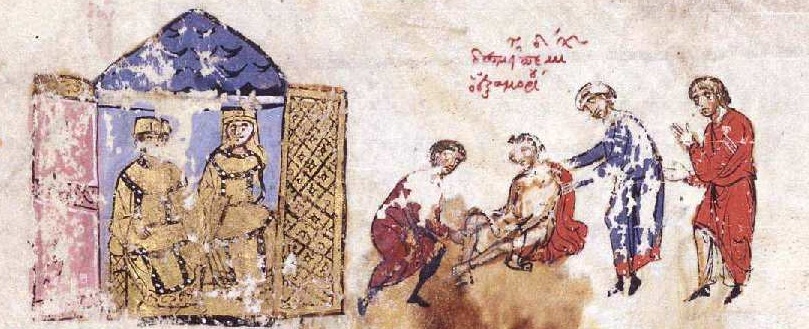
The arrest of Michael the Amorian before Leo V and Theodosia.

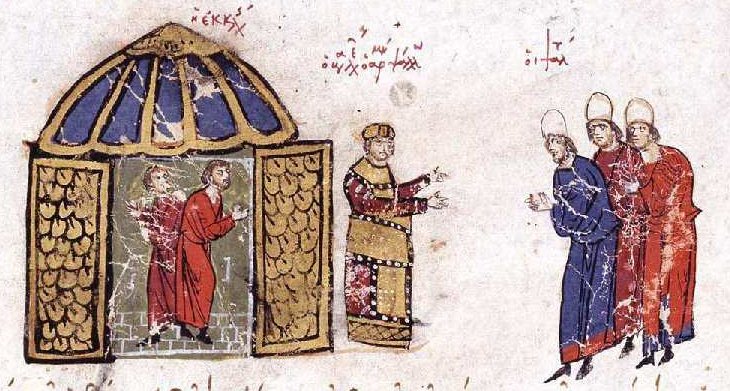
Emperor Leo attending the Christmas celebrations in the St. Stephen chapel.

=== Assassination ===
The conspiracy which was to overthrow Leo was led by the Domestic of the Excubitors, Michael the Amorian, who disapproved of Leo's divorce and remarriage (he was married to the sister of the divorcée). In late 820, agents of the Postal Logothete uncovered the plot. Leo imprisoned him and sentenced him to death by burning, but Empress consort Theodosia arranged a postponement of the execution until after Christmas. This allowed Michael to organise plotters to carry out the assassination of the Emperor in the palace chapel of St. Stephen on Christmas Eve. Leo was attending the matins service when a group of assassins disguised as members of the choir due to sing in the service suddenly threw off their robes and drew their weapons.

In the dim light they mistook the officiating priest for the Emperor and the confusion allowed Leo to snatch a heavy cross from the altar and defend himself. He called for his guards, but the conspirators had barred the doors and within a few moments a sword stroke had severed his arm, and he fell before the communion-table, where his body was hewed in pieces. His remains were dumped unceremoniously in the snow and the assassins hurried to the dungeons to free Michael.

Unfortunately for them Leo had hidden the key on his person, and since it was too early in the morning to find a blacksmith, Michael was hastily crowned as emperor with the iron clasps still around his legs. Leo's family (including his mother and his wife, Theodosia) was exiled to monasteries on the Princes' Islands. His four sons (including ex co-emperor Symbatios) were castrated, a procedure so brutally carried out that one of them died during the "operation".

== Assessment and legacy ==
While the Byzantine bureaucracy preferred the new emperor Michael II (r. 820–829) to Leo, who reinitiated the iconoclast controversy, Leo was popular with the army due to his military victories. Upon news of his assassination, the Anatolic Theme proclaimed Thomas the Slav, who had served with Leo and Michael under Bardanes Tourkos, rightful emperor and avenger of Leo. The Bucellarian, Paphlagonian and Cibyrrhaeot Themes immediately sided with the Anatolics, leading to the outbreak of civil war in 821. Despite overthrowing Leo, Michael continued his iconoclast policies.

The second Byzantine iconoclasm was more moderate than the first. Images that were not actively venerated were permitted and iconodules were not accused of idolatry. There is no substantial evidence that Leo was a fierce persecutor of iconodules as some accounts claim. And further, it is most likely that the second iconoclasm was a genuine reflection of anxiety in the military and the Constantinopolitan population. The military especially was clearly inspired by the heroic image of the iconoclast Constantine V. Leo found more allies in the clergy, especially the learned figure of John VII of Constantinople, his appointee. By the reign of Theophilos (r. 829–842), Theodore the Stoudite and most iconodule bishops had died. However, iconoclasm never had a strong base in the Church, and was easily abolished after Theophilos' death by Empress regent Theodora. John VII was replaced by the iconodule Methodios I. After the institution of the liturgical Feast of Orthodoxy on 11 March 843, now a symbol of the Eastern Orthodox faith, iconoclasm was very rarely defended by any Byzantine clergy. The efforts of the church to affirm its autonomy against imperial authority permanently excluded the Byzantine emperors from ruling on matters of dogma and established the Patriarch of Constantinople as the uncontested head of the church.

Leo resembled the emperors of Isaurian dynasty in ways besides his iconoclasm. By later chroniclers, he was given the reputation of being populist and eager to both pursue justice and undo injustices carried out by the Byzantine bureaucracy. He was a particularly active military leader, going on campaign almost every year.

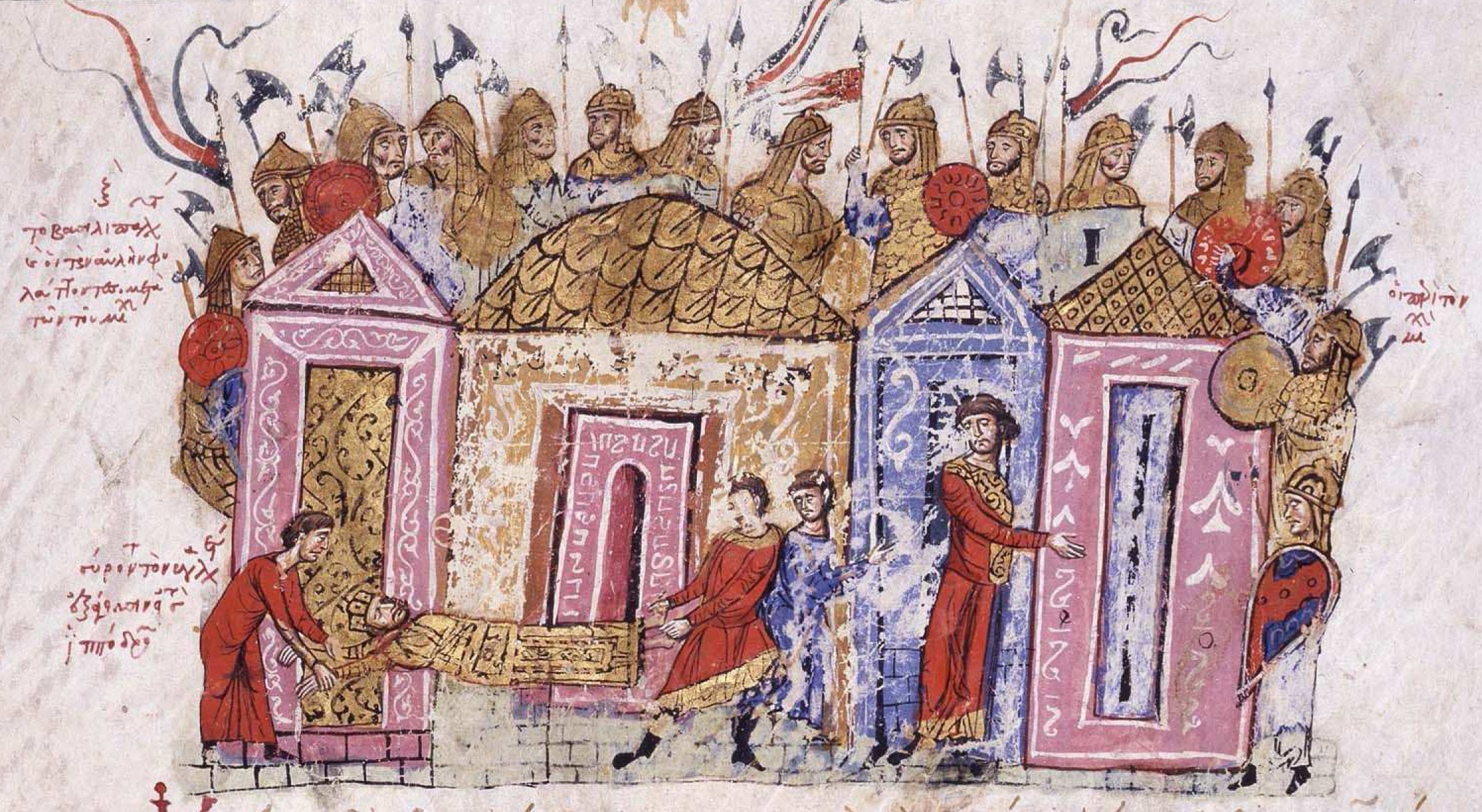
The corpse of Leo V is dragged through the Hippodrome.

=== Possible descendants ===
Nicholas Adontz, in his book The age and origins of the emperor Basil I (1933), expressed a theory that Leo V and Theodosia were ancestors of Basil I. The theory was partly based on the account of his ancestry given by Constantine VII, a grandson of Basil I, as well as the accounts given by Theophanes Continuatus. Basil I, according to these accounts, was a son of peasants. His mother is named by Constantine VII as "Pankalo". The name of his father was not recorded, but the names Symbatios (Smbat) and Constantine have been suggested; both were names used by the eldest sons of Basil, with eldest sons of Byzantines typically named after their grandfathers. The paternal grandfather of Basil is named as Maiactes (or Hmayeak in Armenian). Basil's paternal grandmother was not named but was identified as a daughter of "Leo", a citizen of Constantinople. Adontz identified this Leo as Leo V, which would make Leo V and Theodosia great-grandparents of Basil I.

The scholar Chris Bennett has hypothesised that, for this theory to be true, Leo's daughter would have to have been of marriageable age between the years 780 to 797, which given the ages of her brothers (all born after 800) is unlikely. However, as a counter-argument Bennett has also suggested that Constantine VII may have made a mistake when determining the years separating Maiactes and Basil, and that the latter may have been born at least 20 years after his reported birth date of c. 811. This would indicate that it was Basil's father, rather than Basil himself, who was born at this time and had witnessed the wars with Krum of Bulgaria, and that Leo's daughter could therefore have been born (rather than married) in the 790s, which would make Adontz' theory possible. (Note: Bennett refers to a further possibility, namely that Maiactes and his wife were Basil's great-grandparents and not his grandparents, but does not elaborate further. See Chris Bennett, "The Relationship of Basil I to Leo V" (1995).)

Adontz' theory has been accepted by several genealogists, including Christian Settipani in his search for descent from antiquity. The name "Anna" has been suggested for the daughter of Leo V and Theodosia, because it was given to daughters of Basil I, Leo VI the Wise, Constantine VII and Romanos II – almost every emperor that would claim descent from this woman.

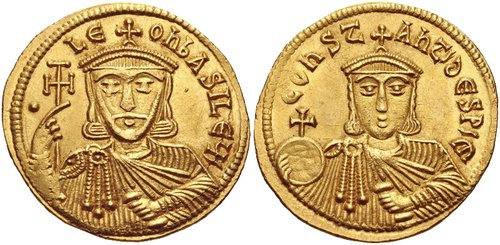
Solidus of Leo V with his son and co-emperor, Constantine

== Family ==
All known children of Leo V are traditionally attributed to his wife Theodosia, a daughter of the patrician Arsaber. Genesius records four sons:

- Symbatios (Συμβάτιος), renamed Constantine, co-emperor from 814 to 820. Castrated and exiled following the assassination of his father.
- Basil. Castrated and exiled following the assassination of his father. Still alive in 847, recorded to have supported the election of Patriarch Ignatius of Constantinople.
- Gregory. Castrated and exiled following the assassination of his father. Still alive in 847, recorded to have supported the election of Patriarch Ignatius of Constantinople.
- Theodosios (died in 820). Castrated and exiled following the assassination of his father. Died soon after his castration.

The existence of a daughter has been debated by historians and genealogists. The tentative name "Anna" has been suggested (see above). She married Hmayeak, a Mamikonian prince (died c. 797), by whom she had Konstantinos, an officer at the court of Emperor Michael III.

== See also ==
- List of Byzantine emperors

== Notes ==
Regnal titles
Preceded by Michael I	Byzantine emperor 12 July 813 – 25 December 820 with Symbatios Constantine	Succeeded by Michael II
Political offices
Vacant Title last held by Nikephoros I	Roman consul 814	Vacant Title next held by Michael II
