= Sarantapechos =

Byzantine noble family

Sarantapechos Σαραντάπηχος
- Noble family
- Country: Byzantine Empire
- Origin: Athens, Hellas
- Founded: 8th century
- Titles: Patrician, Spatharios, Empress
- Members: Irene of Athens, Constantine Sarantapechos, Theophylact Sarantapechos, Leon Sarantapechos
- Connected members: Theophano of Athens
- Connected families: Isaurian dynasty

Sarantapechos (Greek: Σαραντάπηχος, Sarantápēchos), (Note: [saraˈndapixos]; also found as 'Sarantapechys' (Σαραντάπηχυς) or 'Tessarakontapechys' (Τεσσαρακοντάπηχυς), lit. '[tall as] forty cubits'.) feminine form Sarantapechaena (Greek: Σαρανταπήχαινα, Sarantapḗchaina), was a Byzantine Greek noble family originating from Athens. The family is attested in the second half of the eighth century, as well as in the early ninth century and is thought to have been of political influence in central Greece at the time. Very few members are known of the family, the first and most prominent being Irene of Athens, who, after her marriage to emperor Leo IV, became empress consort, later regent, and finally the first empress regnant of the Byzantine Empire in 797.

== History ==
=== Name and early accounts ===
The name Sarantapēchos, from Greek σαράντα saránta ('forty') and πήχυς pḗchys ('cubit'), was probably a reference to one particularly tall member who gave the exaggerated epithet to his family (forty cubits is approximately sixty feet or eighteen meters) and reflected a common Byzantine tradition of name-giving based on physical attributes, geographical origins or a particular trade. Variations of the name include "Tessarakontapechys", from Ancient Greek tessarakonta ('forty'), and the latinized form Serantapicus.

The Kitāb al-‘Uyūn mentions a Byzantine patrician of the early 8th century as "son of forty cubits" which is generally understood as the Arabic translation of the Greek Sarantapechos. During the 717 siege of Constantinople, he delivers a message from emperor Leo III to the Arab general Maslama negotiating a peace treaty. This patrician is occasionally identified with Beser (Βησήρ; from his Arabic given name Bashir), a Byzantine from Pergamon, who abandoned Christianity when he was captured by the Arabs as a child, but later gained his freedom and returned to the empire. Both Greek and Syriac sources mention an apostate named Beser as a company of emperor Leo, but it remains uncertain whether Beser is in fact the messenger who is mentioned in the Kitab al-Uyun. The nickname Tessarakontapechys is also given by John of Jerusalem to an iconoclast Jewish magician who is said to have tricked Yazīd II with a prophecy into having all icons in his realm destroyed. Scholars have questioned whether the patrician "son of forty cubits" and the iconoclast magician could be associated, but a connection between them is generally unlikely. While the patrician could have been an early ancestor of the Sarantapechos family, the historicity of the magician is generally doubted and he is sometimes considered a legendary figure.

=== Background ===
The earliest known member of the Sarantapechos family, Irene Sarantapechaina, appears in the Byzantine sources during the second half of the 8th century, starting with her marriage to the future emperor Leo IV in 769. Based on information supplied from the Chronicle of Theophanes the Confessor, it is clear that the family was well established in the region and known by their family name. Scholars conclude that the family was wealthy and likely of political significance in the Helladic theme, based on the fact that Irene travelled to Constantinople in order to become the bride of the emperor's son. The alliance with the Sarantapechos family is thought to have been a result of serious calculation, as the emperor Constantine V sought to strengthen his control over remote and critical areas of his empire. By binding an established local Orthodox family, the emperor expected to expand his influence in mainland Greece, gain local support, and secure the conversion and assimilation of the invading Slavic tribes. Upon arriving in Constantinople in 769, Irene was not named as a member of the Sarantapechos family, which might suggest that the name was not well known throughout the empire, or most likely that her father was dead. Irene would, indeed, later claim to be an orphan.

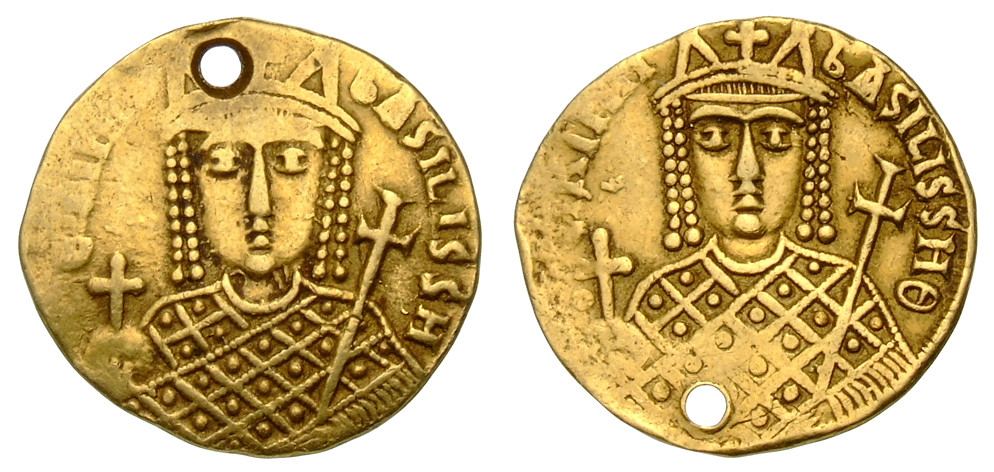
Draped bust of Irene with crown and stole (loros) holding a globe with a cross (sphaira) in her right hand and a cross scepter in her left hand.

=== Known members ===
Constantine Sarantapechos, Irene's relative –usually suggested brother-in-law or uncle– was a patrician and maybe a strategos (military commander) of the Byzantine theme of Hellas. Constantine's son and therefore Irene's nephew or cousin, Theophylact (Θεοφύλακτος), was a spatharios and is mentioned as having been involved in suppressing an uprising against Constantine V's sons in 799. Another patrician named Leon Sarantapechos is mentioned in 802; based on his surname he was likely a member of the family, but the exact relation is unknown. Irene herself would place some of her relatives in positions of prominence, with a cousin –or sister– marrying the Bulgar khan Telerig, and another relative, Theophano of Athens, marrying the future Byzantine emperor Staurakios. The monk Nicetas the Patrician, who was probably a member of the Monomachos family, is likely to have been a distant relative of Irene.

The construction of several Byzantine churches during Irene's reign has been attributed to Irene or her relatives, including the Little Metropolis in central Athens. During the ninth century, family members are said to have moved to Corinthia, Peloponnese, where they settled in the village Sarantapecho, which is believed to have been named after them. Due to its strategic location, the village was strongly fortified against invaders, with traces of its fortification still visible today.

== See also ==
- Constantine VI
- Byzantine Empire under the Isaurian dynasty
