= Staurakios (eunuch) =

Byzantine court official (died 800)

- Died: 3 June 800
- Years active: 781–800
- Known for: Court eunuch; de facto prime minister for Irene of Athens

Staurakios (Greek: Σταυράκιος, sometimes Latinized Stauracius; died 3 June 800) was a Byzantine Greek official and court eunuch. He rose to be one of the most important and influential associates of Byzantine empress Irene of Athens (r. 797–802). He effectively acted as chief minister during her regency for her young son, Emperor Constantine VI (r. 780–797) in 780–790, until he was overthrown and exiled by a military revolt in favour of the young emperor in 790. Restored to power by Constantine along with Irene in 792, Staurakios aided her in the eventual removal, blinding, and possible murder of her son in 797. His own position thereafter was threatened by the rise of another powerful eunuch, Aetios. Their increasing rivalry, and Staurakios's own imperial ambitions, were only resolved by Staurakios's death.

== Biography ==
=== First minister under Irene's regency ===
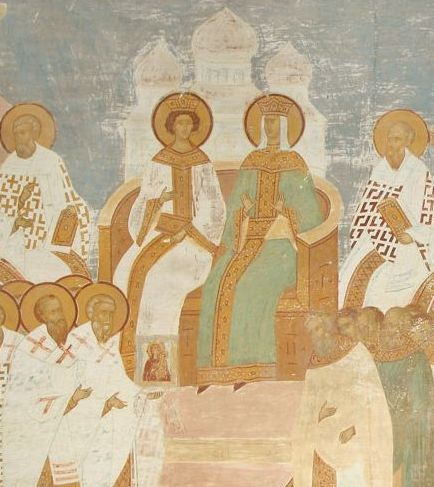
15th-century fresco showing Empress Irene and Emperor Constantine VI presiding over the final session of the Seventh Ecumenical Council (Second Council of Nicaea), which first overturned Iconoclasm.

Staurakios emerged into prominence in 781, when Irene, as regent for her infant son Constantine VI, appointed him to the post of logothetes tou dromou, the Byzantine Empire's foreign minister. Already holding the high court rank of patrikios, through this appointment Staurakios became, in the words of the chronicler Theophanes the Confessor, "the foremost man of his day and in charge of everything" for most of Irene's subsequent reign. This appointment was part of Irene's consistent policy to rely on eunuch officials as ministers and generals, in large part the result of her distrust towards the established generals of her late husband, Leo IV (r. 775–780) and his father Constantine V (r. 741–775). The generals, intensely loyal to the Isaurian dynasty and its vehemently iconoclastic policies, could threaten her own position: already a few weeks after Leo IV's death, Irene had foiled a palace plot to put his surviving brother, the Caesar Nikephoros, on the throne.

Resentment at Staurakios's appointment to this powerful post is given by the Byzantine chroniclers as the reason for the (initially secret) defection of the prominent Armenian strategos of the Bucellarian Theme, Tatzates, to the Arabs in 782. This was a critical blow to the Byzantines, who at that time had almost succeeded in encircling the invading army of the future Caliph Harun al-Rashid (r. 786–809). On Tatzates's suggestion, Harun asked for negotiations, but when the imperial envoys, including Staurakios, arrived, they were seized and held as hostages. At this point, Tatzates and his men publicly went over to the Caliph. Staurakios and the other envoys were released only when Empress Irene accepted the Caliph's harsh terms for a three-year truce, including the annual payment of an enormous tribute of 70,000 or 90,000 gold dinars and the handing over of 10,000 silk garments.

In the next year, Staurakios led an imperial expedition against the Slavic communities (Sclaviniae) of Greece. Setting out from Constantinople, the imperial army followed the Thracian coast into Macedonia, and then south into Thessaly, Central Greece and the Peloponnese. This expedition restored a measure of Byzantine imperial authority over these areas, and collected booty and tribute from the locals. Empress Irene rewarded her loyal minister by allowing him to celebrate a triumph in the Hippodrome of Constantinople in January 784.

Buoyed by this success, which was followed by a restoration of imperial control in much of Thrace as far as Philippopolis, Irene moved towards the restoration of the veneration of icons, which had been prohibited by Emperor Constantine V. A new ecumenical council was convened. Initially, in 786, it was held in the Church of the Holy Apostles in Constantinople, but the soldiers of the tagmata, founded by Constantine V and loyal to his iconoclastic policies, gathered outside in protest and forced the assembly to be broken up. In order to neutralise their reaction, Irene sent the tagmata to the army base of Malagina in Bithynia, allegedly in preparation for a campaign against the Arabs. There, some 1,500 of the soldiers were dismissed while Staurakios brought loyal thematic troops from Thrace to guard the capital. Irene then reconvened the council at Nicaea, after dismissing the most recalcitrant iconoclast bishops. Predictably, iconoclasm was overturned as a heresy, and the veneration of images was restored.

=== Clash with Constantine VI ===
In 788, Staurakios is recorded as attending as a judge in the bride show for the 17-year-old Constantine VI, along with Irene and the young Byzantine emperor himself. Maria of Amnia was chosen, although Constantine was unhappy about the breaking up of his earlier betrothal with Rotrude, Charlemagne's daughter. From this point on, he began to resent his mother's control over state affairs and the power of her eunuch officials. Along with a few trusted conspirators, Constantine planned to arrest Staurakios and exile him to Sicily, while he would assume his position as effective co-ruler of the Byzantine Empire. Their plans were pre-empted by Staurakios, however: he persuaded Irene to arrest, torture, exile or imprison Constantine's associates, while Constantine himself was placed under house arrest. Next, Irene demanded of the army an oath of loyalty, whose wording placed her before her son in precedence. This demand provoked a mutiny by the soldiers of the Armeniac Theme, which then spread throughout the Anatolian armies, which assembled in Bithynia and demanded Emperor Constantine's release. Bowing to their pressure, Irene capitulated and Constantine was installed as sole ruler in December 790. Among Constantine's first acts was to have Staurakios flogged, tonsured, and exiled to the Armeniac Theme, while all other eunuch officials were likewise exiled.

Irene remained confined in a palace at the Harbour of Eleutherios in the capital and retained her formal title as empress. Then, on 15 January 792, for reasons not clear, she was recalled to the imperial palace with her title as empress and co-ruler confirmed and her name restored in the imperial acclamations. Staurakios, too, seems to have been recalled and, along with Irene, again took an active role in the governance of the state. On his mother's re-entry, Constantine was either more occupied with his personal amusements or overseeing the army for campaigns, thus leaving the household, government, and finances to her and her eunuchs. Moreover, he consulted her or the men around him about all his plans and made important decisions with their consent. This turn of events drove the Armeniacs once again to mutiny, but their commander, Alexios Mosele, was in Constantinople. Despite guarantees of safety, Mosele was imprisoned and later blinded at the instigation of Irene and Staurakios, both eager to take revenge for his role in their overthrow in 790.

This alienated the army, especially the Armeniacs, who had provided a firm support base for Constantine VI against his mother. With his strong power base lost or diminished, he became more dependent on his mother and her group. In 795, Constantine also strained relations with the Church in the so-called "Moechian Controversy", when he divorced Maria and married his mistress Theodote. As a result, Empress Irene's position within the capital's bureaucracy was strengthened, her influence over the states of the empire increased, and she began plotting against her son. Constantine, who did not think of conspiracies, often enjoyed himself, hunting and resting, and left his mother to manage everything, especially when he had taken the whole court to Porsa for pleasure, but when he learned that his wife Theodote gave birth to a son, he returned to the capital and left his mother alone with all the court and soldiers, and this gave her more and easier time to advance her goals. While Irene bribed the tagmata and drew groups of important nobles, senior courtiers, church clergy and officers of other armies near the capital and provinces and even Constantine's close friends, Staurakios and other agents of Irene foiled an expedition headed by Constantine against the Arabs, afraid that a victory would boost the emperor's standing with the people and the army. As he returned to the capital, Constantine was seized and blinded. Although it was officially stated that he survived and remained imprisoned, he likely died of his wounds sometime after.

=== Irene's sole rule and Staurakios's rivalry with Aetios ===
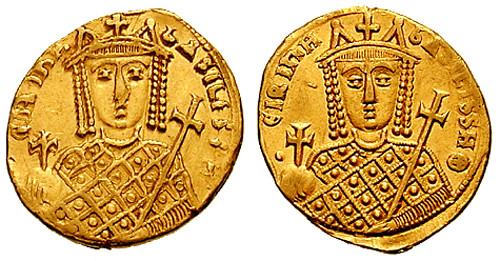
Gold solidus of Empress Irene during her sole rule (r. 797–802).

With the removal of Constantine VI, Irene henceforth reigned alone, the first Byzantine empress to do so. Staurakios, however, found his own position increasingly challenged by another powerful eunuch and trusted servant of the empress, Aetios. Both were engaged in an intense rivalry to place their relatives in positions of power so as to secure control of the Empire after Irene's death.

This rivalry intensified when Irene fell seriously ill in May 799. With the backing of the Domestic of the Schools, Niketas Triphyllios, Aetios accused Staurakios to Irene of planning to usurp the throne. Irene held a council at the Palace of Hieria, where her powerful minister was rebuked but got off with an apology. Staurakios now began preparing his own counter stroke, bribing members of the tagmata, although he seems to have lacked supporters among the higher command echelons. Although a eunuch was legally barred from the imperial throne, Staurakios nevertheless seems to have aspired to seize it for himself. Warned by Aetios, Empress Irene issued orders in February 800 that no one from the military should have any contact with Staurakios. This measure curbed the latter's designs, and introduced a precarious balance between Staurakios and Aetios, the latter still supported by Niketas Triphyllios. Soon after, Staurakios fell fatally ill, reportedly coughing up blood. Nevertheless, persuaded by doctors, monks and soothsayers that he would live and become Byzantine emperor, he instigated a revolt in Cappadocia against his adversary Aetios, who had by then secured the post of strategos of the Anatolic Theme (the highest-ranked military position in the Byzantine Empire). However, even before news of the revolt, which was swiftly suppressed, reached the capital, Staurakios died on 3 June 800.

== Sources ==
- Garland, Lynda (1999). Byzantine Empresses: Women and Power in Byzantium, AD 527–1204. New York and London: Routledge. ISBN 978-0-415-14688-3.
- Kaegi, Walter Emil (1981). Byzantine Military Unrest, 471–843: An Interpretation. Amsterdam: Adolf M. Hakkert. ISBN 90-256-0902-3.
- Kazhdan, Alexander, ed. (1991). The Oxford Dictionary of Byzantium. Oxford and New York: Oxford University Press. ISBN 0-19-504652-8.
- Treadgold, Warren (1997). A History of the Byzantine State and Society. Stanford, California: Stanford University Press. ISBN 0-8047-2630-2.
