= Alexios Mosele (general) =

Byzantine general

Alexios Mosele (Greek: Ἀλέξιος Μωσηλέ) or Mousoulem/Mousele (Μουσουλέμ/Μουσελέ) was a late 8th-century Byzantine general of Armenian origin.

== Biography ==
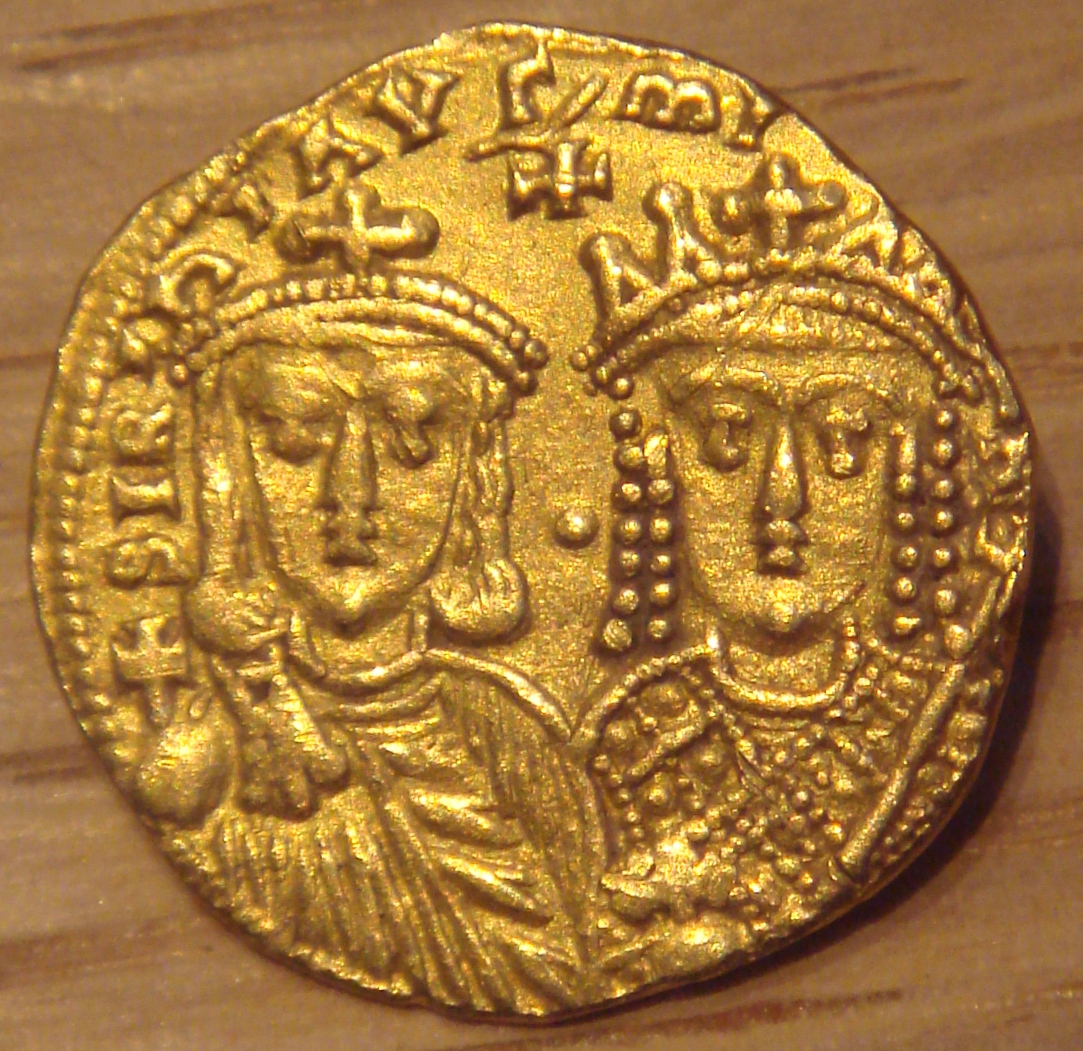
Gold coin of Byzantine emperor Constantine VI (r. 780–797), depicting him and his mother and co-regent, Irene. Mosele supported Constantine against Irene in 790, but was imprisoned and blinded when she returned to power in 792.

Alexios is the first known member of the Mosele/Mousele family of Armenian origin. In 790, he was the commander of the Vigla guard regiment, being the first known occupant of the office. In 790, after Constantine plotted against his mother to seize power, caused a controversy in the court, and after the conspiracy was discovered by Staurakios and told to Irene, she caused Constantine to be placed under house arrest and then ordered all the heads of the army and state, to swear an oath of loyalty to her, this action led to a revolt of Armeniac soldiers. In September of that year, Alexios Mosele was sent by the Empress-regent Irene of Athens (r. 797–802) to deal with the soldiers of the Armeniac Theme, who had refused to swear an oath of loyalty which placed her before her son, Emperor Constantine VI (r. 780–797). The Armeniacs, however, imprisoned their own general Nikephoros, declared Mosele their new commander, and acclaimed Constantine as the sole emperor. At the news of this, the other themes of Asia Minor followed suit in deposing their commanders and affirming Constantine as sole emperor.

The thematic troops then assembled in Bithynia, where they demanded that Irene release Constantine from his de facto house arrest. Bowing to the pressure from the troops, Irene released her son. Emperor Constantine shortly after assumed the reins of government, dismissing Irene's counselors and confining her to a palace in Constantinople. Constantine took action on two counts: he had his tutor recalled and sent him, with the iconoclast general Michael Lachanodrakon, to ensure that the Armeniacs – his hard-core supporters – took an oath that they would not accept Irene as emperor. Mosele was confirmed as the Armeniacs' commander by Constantine, and later summoned to Constantinople and raised to the rank of patrikios. Constantine, however, soon proved incapable to rule the empire effectively, and the military successes, which the soldiers who supported him had hoped for, did not materialize. In January 792, moreover, he recalled his mother from her banishment, restored her to her titles and position of co-emperor, and her name restored in the imperial acclamations, and he demanded that the army acclaim her along with him. Thus he made her co-equal in the work of ruling with himself, for the next five years Irene appears on the obverse of the gold coinage with the title 'Irene Augusta (Empress)', and Constantine is shown on the reverse with the title of basileus (emperor). The Armeniacs once again refused to comply, and they did not accept the co-reign between mother and son, and demanded the return of Mosele from Constantinople. Despite having guaranteed his personal safety, Constantine, who suspected him of designs on the throne, with the advice and encouragement of his mother Empress Irene, had him flogged, tonsured, and imprisoned.

This was followed soon after by the disastrous defeat of the Byzantine army, led by the emperor himself, at the Battle of Marcellae against the Bulgars. As the imperial army grumbled and even the usually loyal tagmata plotted to replace him, Constantine, on the advice of his mother and her eunuch adviser Staurakios, had Mosele blinded. Constantine's uncle, Nikephoros, whom the tagmatic soldiers planned to make emperor, was also blinded, while four other uncles had their tongues cut. At the news of this, the Armeniacs rose in open rebellion. They defeated a loyalist army in November, and were defeated only in May 793 by an expedition under Constantine himself.

== Sources ==
- Garland, Lynda (1999). Byzantine Empresses: Women and Power in Byzantium, AD 527–1204. New York and London: Routledge. ISBN 978-0-415-14688-3.
- Kaegi, Walter Emil (1981). Byzantine Military Unrest, 471–843: An Interpretation. Amsterdam: Adolf M. Hakkert. ISBN 90-256-0902-3.
- Kazhdan, Alexander, ed. (1991). The Oxford Dictionary of Byzantium. New York and Oxford: Oxford University Press. ISBN 978-0-19-504652-6.
- Treadgold, Warren (1997). A History of the Byzantine State and Society. Stanford, California: Stanford University Press. ISBN 0-8047-2630-2.
- Winkelmann, Friedhelm; Lilie, Ralph-Johannes; Ludwig, Claudia; Pratsch, Thomas; Rochow, Ilse (1999). "Alexios Musele(m) (#193)". Prosopographie der mittelbyzantinischen Zeit: I. Abteilung (641–867), 1. Band: Aaron (#1) – Georgios (#2182) (in German). Berlin and New York: Walter de Gruyter. pp. 58–59. ISBN 978-3-11-015179-4.
