= Sisinnios Triphyllios =

Senior Byzantine dignitary (died 811)

Sisinnios Triphyllios (Greek: Σισίννιος Τριφύλλιος; died 26 July 811) was one of the senior dignitaries of the Roman Empire during the reign of Empress Irene of Athens (797–802) and her successor Emperor Nikephoros I (802–811).

Sisinnios first appears in Irene's unique triumphal procession on Easter Monday, 1 April 799, through the imperial capital, Constantinople. At the time, he held the post of strategos (military governor) of Thrace, the theme closest to Constantinople, and holder of the supreme dignity of patrikios. He was one of the four patrikioi (along with Bardanes Tourkos, Constantine Boilas, and Sisinnios' brother Niketas) leading the four white horses which drew the imperial carriage, a role which marked these men out as the most prominent of Irene's supporters among the high dignitaries of the state.

Despite their earlier support of Irene, the Triphyllioi brothers opposed the rising influence of the eunuch Aetios (who replaced Sisinnios as strategos of Thrace with his own brother Leo sometime in 801/802) and the fiscal policies adopted by Irene over the next years. They were thus among the leaders of her overthrow by the General Logothete, Nikephoros I, on 31 October 802. As a patrikios, Sisinnios remained influential under Nikephoros, but is not recorded as having held any specific post. The death of his brother on 30 April 803 is rumoured by some Eastern Roman chroniclers to have been ordered by Nikephoros, but given Sisinnios' close relations with the emperor throughout the latter's reign, this is unlikely. Sisinnios was among the magnates who accompanied Nikephoros on his campaign against the Bulgars in spring-summer 811, and was among those slain in the disastrous Battle of Pliska on 26 July.

== Sources ==
- Treadgold, Warren (1988). The Byzantine Revival, 780–842. Stanford, California: Stanford University Press. ISBN 978-0-8047-1462-4.
- Winkelmann, Friedhelm; Lilie, Ralph-Johannes; et al. (2001). Prosopographie der mittelbyzantinischen Zeit: I. Abteilung (641–867), 4. Band (in German). Walter de Gruyter. ISBN 978-3-11-016674-3.
