= Elpidius (rebel) =

Elpidius or Elpidios (Ancient Greek: Ἐλπίδιος) was a Byzantine aristocrat and governor of Sicily, who was accused of conspiring against Empress Irene of Athens (r. 780–802). This forced him to rebel, and after being defeated he defected to the Abbasid Caliphate and was recognized there as Byzantine emperor.

== Biography ==
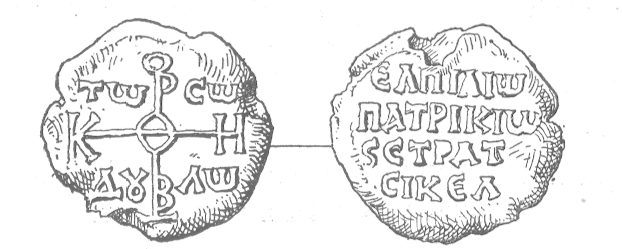
Seal of Elpidius as patrikios and strategos of Sicily

Nothing is known of Elpidius before February 781, when Empress Irene (r. 780–802) appointed him as governor (strategos) of the theme of Sicily. At the time, he already held the highest Byzantine dignity, that of patrikios, and the chronicler Theophanes the Confessor simply mentions that he had held the governorship of Sicily in the past, either under Leo IV the Khazar (r. 775–780) or possibly Constantine V (r. 741–775). Soon after, however, on 15 April, Irene was informed that he had supported a plot, discovered in October of the previous year to depose her and elevate the Caesar Nikephoros, the eldest surviving son of Constantine V, to power. Irene immediately dispatched the spatharios Theophilos to Sicily to bring Elpidius back to Constantinople. Although his wife and children were left behind in Constantinople, Elpidius refused the summons and was supported by the people and the local army. It does not seem that Elpidius declared himself explicitly in revolt against Irene, but the Empress nevertheless had his wife and children publicly whipped and imprisoned in the capital's praetorium.

In autumn of 781 or early 782, Irene dispatched against him a large fleet under a trusted court eunuch, the patrikios Theodore. Elpidius's own military forces were meager, and after several battles he was defeated. Along with his lieutenant, the doux Nikephoros (probably the commander of Calabria), he gathered what remained of the theme's treasury and fled to North Africa, where the Arab authorities welcomed him. There, he had himself proclaimed emperor, a claim that was formally—but apparently not very seriously—acknowledged by the Abbasid government. His life thereafter is obscure, except for his participation in a large-scale campaign (reportedly 40,000 men) against Byzantium in 792 or 794. The Abbasids probably hoped that they could set him up as a rival emperor in at least part of Asia Minor, but the invading army was met with the onset of an early and heavy winter, losing many men to cold, and was forced to retreat. According to Syriac sources, he was still alive in 802, when Irene was deposed by Nikephoros I (r. 802–811). When learning of this event, he is said to have advised Abd al-Malik ibn Salih, Emir of Mesopotamia, to "throw away his silk and put on his armour", as Nikephoros would pursue a more aggressive policy against the Abbasids than Irene.

== Sources ==
- Lilie, Ralph-Johannes; Ludwig, Claudia; Pratsch, Thomas; Zielke, Beate (1999). Prosopographie der mittelbyzantinischen Zeit: 1. Abteilung (641–867), Band 1: Aaron (# 1) – Georgios (# 2182) (in German). Berlin and Boston: De Gruyter. pp. 486–487. ISBN 978-3-11-015179-4.
- Prigent, Vivien; Nichanian, Mikaël (2003). "Les stratèges de Sicile. De la naissance du thème au règne de Léon V". Revue des études byzantines (in French). 61: 97–141. doi:10.3406/rebyz.2003.2273.
- Treadgold, Warren (1988). The Byzantine Revival, 780–842. Stanford, California: Stanford University Press. ISBN 978-0-8047-1462-4.
