= Aetios (eunuch) =

Byzantine court official

Aetios or Aetius (Ancient Greek: Ἀέτιος) was a Byzantine eunuch official and one of the most trusted advisers of Byzantine empress Irene of Athens (r. 797–802). After Irene's rise to sole rule, Aetios developed an intense rivalry with her eunuch chief minister Staurakios. After Staurakios's death, Aetios became the leading man in the state. He plotted to usurp the throne for his brother, Leo, but lost power when Irene was deposed in 802.

== Biography ==
=== Early years and rivalry with Staurakios ===
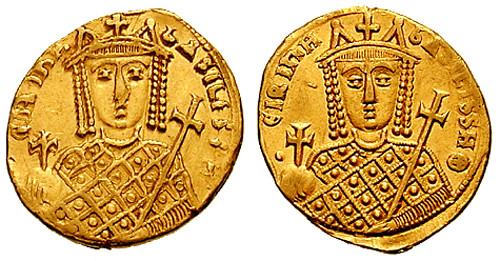
Gold solidus of Empress Irene during her sole rule (r. 797–802).

Aetios first appears in 790, when he was a protospatharios and a confidant of Irene, then the Byzantine empress-mother and regent for her young son, Emperor Constantine VI (r. 780–797). In the autumn of that year, Irene tried to sideline her son and assume full rule over the Byzantine Empire. Because Constantine agreed on a plot to seize her powerful eunuch minister Staurakios and exile him to Sicily, though not to depose Irene, and he could rule undisturbed, though with the benefit of his mother's advice. But, Irene reacted with the firmness she always showed when her authority was challenged, and she ordered the arrest, flogged and tonsured and exiled of Constantine's collaborators. She rebuked Constantine harshly and at length, even slapped him, and then kept him confined to his quarters. After this incident, Irene sent officials to administer an oath to the entire army that as long as she lived they would not allow Constantine to take power. They were further to acclaim the emperors not as "Constantine and Irene," but as "Irene and Constantine." The army began to take the oath without opposition.

This was Irene's boldest move to date. That she succeeded in it even for the moment shows how firmly in control she was. Constantine was emperor, not she. He obviously wanted to rule; neither his age nor any other impediment now disqualified him. Treason was rebellion against the emperor, and only by the most strained interpretation of Irene's regency or co-cmperorship could Constantine have been guilty of that. Practically everyone in the empire knew these facts. But the leading government of-ficials and high-ranking army officers owed their appointments to Irene and had found her faithful to her allies and unforgiving of her opponents. About Con-stantine they could not be sure, especially because his plan to rule with his mother showed an indecisiveness that offered little security to anyone who supported him against her. Junior officers and officials, however, not to speak of the rank and file of the army, had no such reasons for prefer-ring the empress. However, her actions provoked a mutiny by the Armeniac theme in favour of the young emperor. Constantine was installed as sole ruler, Irene confined to a palace in Constantinople, and her eunuch protégés, including Aetios, were exiled.

Apparently bewildered by his responsibilities, Constantine came under pressure from his mother and his principal officials to restore her to a role in the government. No adult emperor had ever ruled with his mother before, and Irene's previous behavior hardly justified special treatment. Aetios was restored to his position, along with the other eunuchs, when Irene was recalled to power as a co-ruler in January 15, 792. Though he was now senior emperor, Constantine felt unable to break with his mother and needed her advice, whereas Irene needed her son's consent to rule at all and her position depended on him. From the very beginning of her return, Irene carried out skillful intrigues and arrangements in all directions to discredit her son, to alienate or disperse his supporters, and to increase her own prestige and expand her support network. In August 797, Irene and her powerful eunuch minister Staurakios succeeded in overthrowing and blinding (and possibly also killing) Constantine, thus she assumed governance of the state. However, the uncles of the deposed emperor, the surviving younger sons of Emperor Constantine V (r. 741–775), who had in the past been involved in plots against Irene, were still a potential threat. They were persuaded by sympathizers to seek refuge in the cathedral of Hagia Sophia, where the capital's populace would supposedly rally to them and declare one of them as emperor. No such support materialized; instead, Aetios managed to achieve their surrender, and they were exiled to Irene's home town of Athens.

Irene now divided her favour between Staurakios, her old-established chief minister, and Aetios, her new minister. The issue had now become critically important, because Irene was the sole emperor and had no heir. During her regency and co-rule over her son, she had relied on eunuchs to govern, and she continued to do so during her sole reign. This began a period of intense rivalry between the two and their respective supporters, as they raced to place their relatives in positions of power, so as to secure control of the Byzantine Empire after Irene's eventual death. This competition came to the fore in 797/798, and intensified in May 799, when Irene fell seriously ill. The reason Irene did not curb their rivalry or take sides between them was for three reasons; first, she was tormented by her guilt in her son's downfall after eliminating him, second, she, drunk with her absolute power, did not see either of them as a threat, and third, she needed both to run the empire. Of course, their rivalry was beyond her expectations and soon forced her to judge in favor of one over the other, based on more supporters and evidence in favor of one of them. Aetios, who had won the backing of Niketas Triphyllios, the commander of the Scholai guards, accused Staurakios before the Empress of plotting to usurp the throne. Irene duly convened a council at the Palace of Hieria where she severely rebuked her favourite minister, but Staurakios escaped with an apology.

Staurakios in turn began to distribute bribes amongst the men and lower officers of the Scholai and Exkoubitores regiments, trying to win their support for an eventual coup. Aetios again went to Irene, who in February 800 forbade anyone from the military to contact Staurakios. Coupled with Aetios's own appointment to the powerful post of strategos of the Anatolic Theme, this restored a precarious balance between the two camps. Soon after, Staurakios became very ill, but he continued plotting against Aetios, instigating a revolt against him in Cappadocia before dying in June 800.

=== Supremacy and downfall of Aetios ===
The revolt was quickly and brutally subdued, and with his rival's death, Aetios stood supreme amongst Empress Irene's court. He likely succeeded Staurakios as logothetes tou dromou, while retaining control of the Anatolics and adding to his command the Opsician Theme. He gained a victory in 800 against the Arabs, which was followed, however, by a defeat in 801. In 801/802, Aetios appointed his brother Leo as monostrategos of the themes of Thrace and Macedonia. Controlling thus the armies closest to Constantinople, which comprised about a third of the Byzantine Empire's entire military forces, he was well placed to make Leo emperor. In the words of the chronicler Theophanes the Confessor, he "ruled by [Irene's] side and was usurping power on behalf of his brother". Consequently, in 802, Aetios was instrumental in the rejection of a marriage offer from Charlemagne, which Irene had apparently seriously considered.

Aetios's plans for his brother's elevation faltered with the opposition of the other courtiers, who resented his influence and the insulting manner with which he treated them. Chief among them were Nikephoros, Irene's finance minister (logothetes tou genikou), but also Niketas Triphyllios, Aetios's former ally, and Leo Sarantapechos, a relative of the Byzantine empress. Fearing an imminent coup by Aetios, the conspirators, in the morning of October 31, 802, entered the Great Palace and acclaimed Nikephoros emperor. Irene was deposed and allowed to retire to a convent.

It is not known what became of Aetios after that. He most likely lost power upon Nikephoros's accession, but he may be the patrikios Aetios who was killed, along with Nikephoros himself, in the Battle of Pliska against the Bulgars on July 26, 811.

== Sources ==
- Garland, Lynda (1999). Byzantine Empresses: Women and Power in Byzantium, AD 527–1204. New York and London: Routledge. ISBN 978-0-415-14688-3.
- Kazhdan, Alexander, ed. (1991). The Oxford Dictionary of Byzantium. Oxford and New York: Oxford University Press. ISBN 0-19-504652-8.
- Treadgold, Warren (1997). A History of the Byzantine State and Society. Stanford, California: Stanford University Press. ISBN 0-8047-2630-2.
