= The Wanderer's Necklace =

1914 novel by H. Rider Haggard

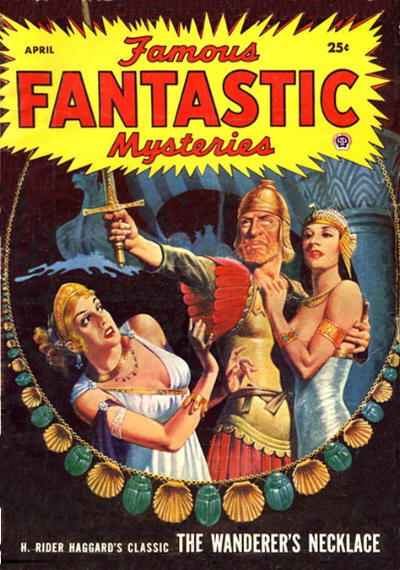
- The Wanderer's Necklace was reprinted in the April 1953 issue of Famous Fantastic Mysteries
- Author: H. Rider Haggard
- Language: English
- Publication date: 1914
- Publication place: United Kingdom

The Wanderer's Necklace is a novel by English writer H. Rider Haggard.

== Plot ==
Olaf, a Norseman in the eighth century AD, flees his homeland after challenging the Norse god Odin's right to a human sacrifice, travels to Constantinople to protect the Empress Irene, Augusta, from her son Constantine VI, and other enemies of the Eastern Roman Empire. From Byzantium, to the pyramid tombs of Upper Egypt, Olaf becomes a traveling Christian who must reject the adulterous advances of Irene. Blinded as punishment for rejecting the Empress, Olaf's adventures are woven within the intrigues of the Eastern Roman Empire.

Olaf begins his recollections with a polar bear hunt, leading on to his fame as a great hunter, and excavating his previous life's gravesite to recover a necklace. Half of the necklace lies on a mummy reposing within a pharaoh's tomb in ancient Egypt. The adventure novel shows how these two events tie together past and present lives.
