= Niketas Triphyllios =

Byzantine official (died 803)

Niketas Triphyllios (Greek: Νικήτας Τριφύλλιος; died 30 April 803) was one of the highest officials of the Roman Empire during the reign of empress Irene of Athens (797–802), holding the position of Domestic of the Schools.

Niketas first appears in Irene's unique triumphal procession on Easter Monday, 1 April 799. At the time, he was already Domestic of the Schools (commander of the elite Scholai regiment) and holder of the supreme dignity of patrikios. Niketas was one of the four patrikioi (along with Bardanes Tourkos, Constantine Boilas, and Niketas' brother Sisinnios) leading the four white horses which drew the imperial carriage, a role that marks him out as one of the most prominent of Irene's supporters among the high dignitaries of the state.

A few weeks later, in May, Irene's health worsened considerably and the issue of her succession became opened. At this point Niketas (and possibly his brother too) allied himself with the eunuch Aetios to curb the influence of Irene's powerful eunuch chief minister, Staurakios. The two went before the empress and accused him of conspiring to seize the throne. Staurakios managed to escape with a rebuke from the empress, but took steps to gather armed support to counter Aetios' and Niketas' control of the army's senior officers. The two camps remained at a stalemate thereafter until February 800, when Staurakios was forbidden to have contacts with the military and Aetios was promoted to the powerful post of strategos of the Anatolic Theme. Despite the fact that Staurakios fell ill soon after, his supporters launched a rebellion on his behalf in Cappadocia. Staurakios however died on 3 June 800, before news of this reached the capital; the revolt was swiftly suppressed.

Despite his earlier support of Irene, Triphyllios opposed the fiscal policies adopted by the empress over the next year, as well as the rising influence of Aetios, who replaced Niketas' brother Sisinnios as strategos of Thrace with his own brother Leo. He was thus among the leaders of her overthrow by the General Logothete, Nikephoros I, on 31 October 802. He remained in his post as Domestic of the Schools until his sudden death on 30 April 803. The imperial chroniclers reporting the rumour that he was poisoned on the orders of Nikephoros, but given Nikephoros' continued close relation with Sisinnios, this is unlikely.

== Sources ==
- Guilland, Rodolphe (1967). Recherches sur les institutions byzantines, Tome I (in French). Berlin: Akademie-Verlag.
- Treadgold, Warren T. (1988). The Byzantine Revival, 780–842. Stanford, California: Stanford University Press. ISBN 0-8047-1462-2.
- Winkelmann, Friedhelm; Lilie, Ralph-Johannes; et al. (1998). Prosopographie der mittelbyzantinischen Zeit: I. Abteilung (641–867), 3. Band (in German). Walter de Gruyter. ISBN 3-11-016673-9.
