= Nikephoros (Caesar) =

Caeser of the Byzantine empire

Nikephoros (Greek: Νικηφόρος, romanized: Nikēphóros), also Latinized as Nicephorus, was the third son of Byzantine emperor Constantine V (reigned 741–775) and Caesar of the Byzantine Empire. He was engaged in a plot against his half-brother, Leo IV (r. 775–780), which cost Nikephoros his title, and was the focal point of numerous usurpation plots during the subsequent reigns of his nephew, Constantine VI (r. 780–797), and of Constantine's mother, Irene of Athens (r. 797–802). He was therefore blinded and exiled to a monastery for most of his life, probably dying in the island of Aphousia sometime after 812.

== Biography ==
=== Early life and first conspiracies ===
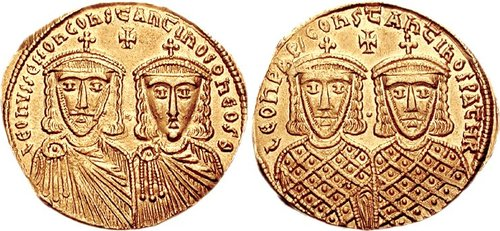
Gold solidus of Leo IV (r. 775–780), depicting Constantine VI (r. 780–797), as well as their ancestors Leo III the Isaurian (r. 717–741) and Constantine V (r. 741–775).

Nikephoros was born in the late 750s (c. 756/758) to Emperor Constantine V and his third wife Eudokia. Nikephoros was Constantine's third son overall, following the future Leo IV, who was born 750 to Constantine's first wife Irene of Khazaria, and Christopher, who was born in circa 755 to Eudokia. Either Christopher or Nikephoros were possibly twin brothers to Eudokia's and Constantine's only daughter, Anthousa. On April 1, 769, Eudokia was crowned as Augusta, and on the same occasion Christopher and Nikephoros were crowned and raised to the rank of Caesar, while their younger brother Niketas was made Nobilissimus. Nikephoros had two other younger brothers, Anthimos and Eudokimos, who were also named Nobilissimi at later dates.

When Constantine V died in 775, his eldest son Leo IV ascended the Byzantine throne. Soon, Leo caused a rift with his half-brothers, when he confiscated a large amount of gold reserved for their use and distributed it to the army and the citizens of Constantinople as a donative. Then, in spring 776, a conspiracy headed by Nikephoros and involving a number of middle-ranking courtiers was discovered. Nikephoros himself was stripped of his rank, but otherwise not harmed, while the other plotters were tonsured as monks and exiled to Cherson in the Crimea.

When Leo IV died in October 780, his sole heir was the young Constantine VI, his son by the Empress Irene of Athens. Due to Constantine's being underage, a regency was instituted under Irene, but this was not well received among leading officials. Not only was rule by a woman alien to the military-dominated establishment of the time, but Irene was also a confirmed iconophile, an adherent of the veneration of holy images. This was regarded as heresy by the state-sponsored doctrine of Iconoclasm, which was especially popular with the army and the officials loyal to Constantine V's memory. A number of them, including the Postal Logothete (foreign minister) Gregory, the former strategos (governor) of the Anatolic Theme Bardas and Constantine, the commander of the Excubitors guard regiment, consequently favoured the rise of Nikephoros to the imperial throne. Barely a month and a half after Leo's death, the plot was discovered. Irene had the conspirators exiled, and Nikephoros and his younger brothers were ordained as priests, removing them from the line of succession. To confirm this before the people, on Christmas Day 780, Nikephoros and his brothers were forced to perform the communion service in the Hagia Sophia.

Nikephoros and his brothers disappear from the sources until 792, when the return of Irene to power (after having been ousted in a military revolt in 790), coupled with the disastrous defeat of Constantine VI at Marcellae against the Bulgars, caused widespread discontent among the troops. Some of the imperial guard regiments, the tagmata, proclaimed Nikephoros as emperor, but Constantine reacted swiftly: at the urging of Irene, he arrested his uncles, and while Nikephoros was blinded, the others had their tongues slit. They were then imprisoned at a monastery in Therapia.

=== After 792 ===
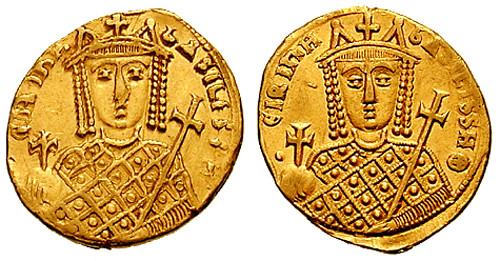
Gold solidus of Irene during her sole reign (797–802).

Nikephoros is no longer mentioned by name after 792; instead, the brothers are mentioned collectively. It is therefore questionable whether he is to be included in subsequent events, although traditionally (including in reference works like the Oxford Dictionary of Byzantium) it is held that he did share in his brothers' fate and died after 812.

After Empress Irene deposed her son in 797, the brothers were visited at the monastery by some of their supporters and persuaded to seek refuge in the Hagia Sophia. If it had been hoped that Constantinople's populace would be moved to proclaim one of them emperor, their hopes were dashed. No uprising in their support materialized, and Irene's trusted eunuch advisor Aetios managed to extricate the brothers and send them to exile in Athens. There, they were again the subject of a conspiracy: in March 799, a certain Akameros, "archon of the Slavs in Belzetia" in southern Thessaly, together with local troops from the theme of Hellas (to which Athens belonged), planned to proclaim one of them emperor. The plot was foiled, but the brothers were again moved to Panormos in the Marmara Sea, and Nikephoros's brothers were blinded as well.

The brothers are mentioned for the last time in 812, when a group of disgruntled soldiers tried to proclaim the brothers emperors in the aftermath of the fall of Debeltum to the Bulgars. Emperor Michael I Rangabe (r. 811–813), however, promptly dismissed the soldiers involved and moved the brothers to the island of Aphousia, where they died sometime later.

== Sources ==
- Garland, Lynda (1999). Byzantine Empresses: Women and Power in Byzantium, AD 527–1204. New York, New York and London, United Kingdom: Routledge. ISBN 978-0-415-14688-3.
- Kaegi, Walter Emil (1981). Byzantine Military Unrest, 471–843: An Interpretation. Amsterdam, the Netherlands: Adolf M. Hakkert. ISBN 90-256-0902-3.
- Kazhdan, Alexander Petrovich, ed. (1991). The Oxford Dictionary of Byzantium. New York, New York and Oxford, United Kingdom: Oxford University Press. ISBN 978-0-19-504652-6.
- Rochow, Ilse (1994). Kaiser Konstantin V. (741–775). Materialien zu seinem Leben und Nachleben (in German). Frankfurt am Main, Deutschland: Peter Lang. ISBN 3-631-47138-6.
- Treadgold, Warren (1997). A History of the Byzantine State and Society. Stanford, California: Stanford University Press. ISBN 0-8047-2630-2.
