= Irene of Athens =

Byzantine empress regnant from 797 to 802

- Augusta; Empress of the Romans
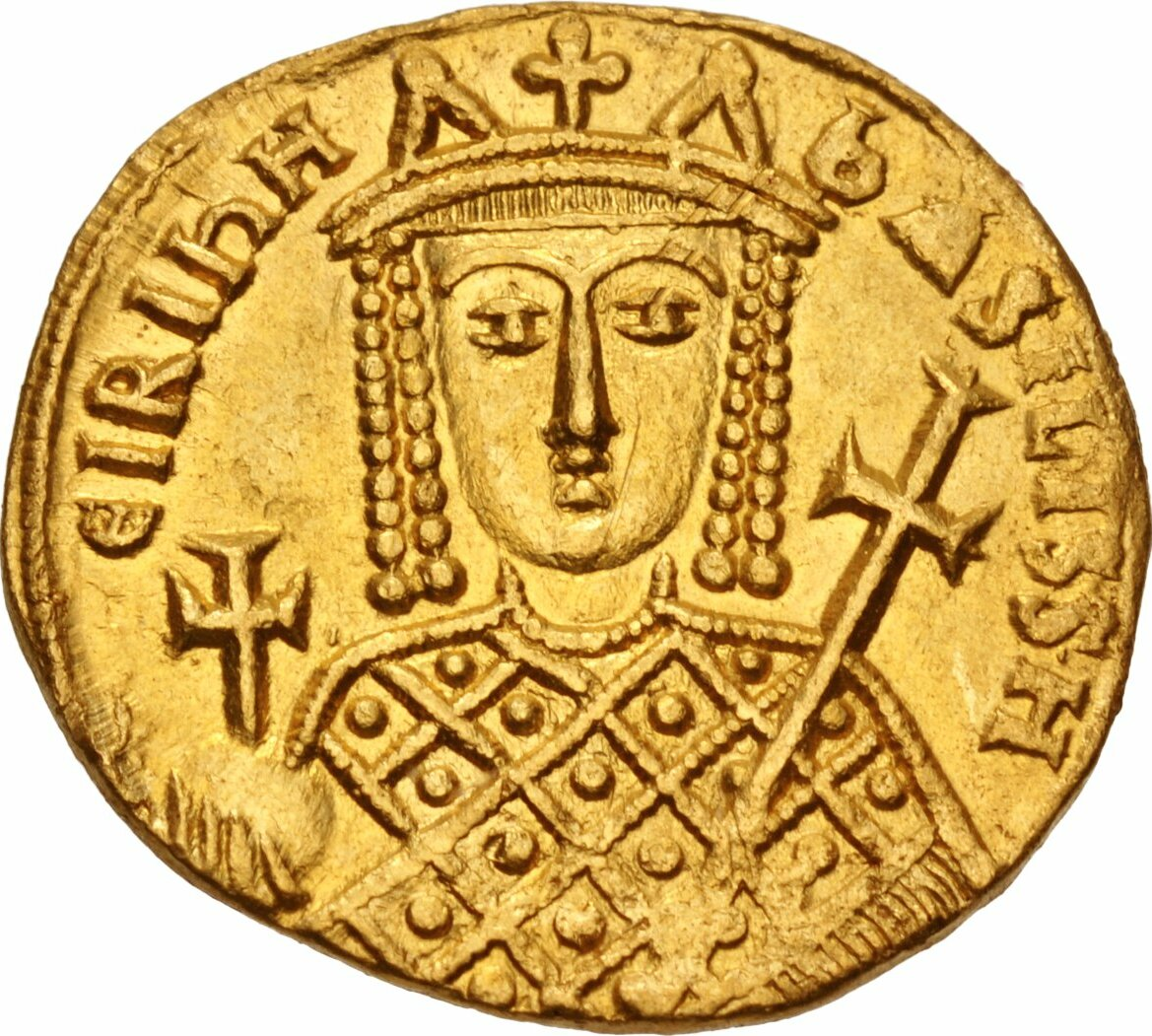
- Solidus of Irene issued during her sole reign

Byzantine empress regnant
- Reign: 19 August 797 – 31 October 802
- Predecessor: Constantine VI
- Successor: Nikephoros I

Byzantine co-empress
- Reign: 792–797
- Acclamation: 15 January 792

Byzantine regent
- Regency: 780–790
- Monarch: Constantine VI

Byzantine empress consort
- Tenure: 775–780
- Coronation: 17 December 769 (as the consort of co-emperor)
- Born: Irene Sarantapechaena; 750–756; Athens, Byzantine Empire
- Died: 9 August 803 (aged 47–53); Lesbos, Byzantine Empire
- Spouse: Leo IV
- Issue: Constantine VI
- Family: Sarantapechos
- Dynasty: Isaurian
- Religion: Chalcedonian Christianity

Irene of Athens (Greek: Εἰρήνη, Eirḗnē; 750/756 – 9 August 803), surname Sarantapechaena (Greek: Σαρανταπήχαινα, Sarantapḗchaina), (Note: Greek pronunciation: [sarandaˈpixena]) was Byzantine empress consort to Emperor Leo IV from 775 to 780, regent during the childhood of their son Constantine VI from 780 until 790, co-ruler from 792 until 797, and finally empress regnant and sole ruler of the Byzantine Empire from 797 to 802. A member of the politically prominent Sarantapechos family, she was selected as Leo IV's bride for unknown reasons in 768. Even though her husband was an iconoclast, she harbored iconophile sympathies. During her regency, in 787, she called the Second Council of Nicaea which condemned iconoclasm as heretical and brought an end to the first iconoclast period (730–787). Irene's concluding five years of sole rule were unprecedented in Roman and Byzantine history. Her public figure in this period was polarizing, due to the setbacks faced by the Empire and her iconophilic stances, often attributed to her gender and the influence of her retinue.

After the death of her husband, Irene secured the throne for her family, setting herself in charge. During her regency with Constantine VI, she became very influential in government policies, largely overshadowing her son. As Constantine VI reached maturity, he began to move out from under the influence of his mother. In the early 790s, several revolts attempted to proclaim him as sole ruler. One of these revolts succeeded, but in 792 Irene was re-established in all imperial powers as "co-emperor" with Constantine VI. In 797, Irene organized a conspiracy in which her supporters gouged out her son's eyes. Constantine was imprisoned and probably died shortly afterwards. With him out of the way, Irene proclaimed herself sole ruler. Pope Leo III—already seeking to break links with the Byzantine East—used Irene's alleged unprecedented status as a female ruler of the Roman Empire to proclaim Charlemagne as Emperor of the Romans on Christmas Day of 800 under the pretext that a woman could not hold the position solely and thus the Roman throne was actually vacant. A revolt in 802 overthrew Irene and exiled her to the island of Lesbos, supplanting her on the throne with Nikephoros I. Irene died in exile less than a year later.

== Early life ==
Irene was born in Athens sometime between 750 and 756. (Note: The Oxford Dictionary of Byzantium gives her birth date as c. 752, but this is not corroborated by contemporary sources. The Ekloge ton nomon issued by Leo III established the minimum age of marriage at 15 for men and 13 for women. Her marriage took place in 769, so she was born in 756 at the latest. On the other hand, Leo IV was 19 years old at the time.) She was a member of the noble Greek Sarantapechos family, which had significant political influence in central mainland Greece. Although she was an orphan, her uncle or cousin Constantine Sarantapechos was a patrician and possibly also a strategos ("military general") of the theme of Hellas at the end of the eighth century. Constantine Sarantapechos's son, Theophylact, was a spatharios and is mentioned as having been involved in suppressing a revolt in 799. According to Theophanes the Confessor, Irene was related to Theophano of Athens who married the Byzantine emperor Staurakios. Another unnamed female relative of Irene was later married to the Bulgar ruler Telerig in 776.

== Empress consort ==
=== Selection and marriage ===
It is unclear why and how Irene was selected as the bride for the young Leo IV. The influence of the prominent Sarantepechos family in the theme of Hellas likely played a part in the selection of Irene as the wife of the emperor's son, indicating the emperor's interest in restoring order in the Greek mainland. Especially unusual is that, while Constantine V was a militant iconoclast who was known for persecuting venerators of icons, Irene herself displayed iconophile predilections. This fact, combined with the limited information available about her family, has led some scholars to speculate that Irene may have been selected in a bride-show, in which eligible young women were paraded before the bridegroom until one was finally selected. If this was the case, then she would have been the first imperial bride to be selected in this manner. However, there is no solid evidence to support this hypothesis other than the apparent oddity of Irene's selection as Leo IV's bride.

Irene arrived in Constantinople on 1 November 769, escorted, per Theophanes, by decorated dromones and chelandia (warships and galleys). She was betrothed to 19-year-old Leo IV, the son of emperor Constantine V, on 3 November at the Church of the Virgin of Pharos. The coronation took place on 17 December in the Augoustaion, and was followed by the couple's marriage at the Palace of Daphne within the Great Palace of Constantinople. On 14 January 771, Irene gave birth to a son, the future Constantine VI, who was named after his grandfather, Irene's father-in-law, Constantine V. When Constantine V died in September 775, Leo IV ascended to the throne at the age of twenty-five, and Irene became empress consort.

=== Iconoclasm ===
Leo IV, though an iconoclast like his father, initially pursued a policy of moderation towards iconophiles. He removed Constantine V's penalties on monasteries and began appointing monks as bishops. When Patriarch Nicetas I of Constantinople died in 780, Leo IV appointed Paul of Cyprus, who had iconophile sympathies, as his successor, although he did force him to swear oaths that he would uphold the official iconoclasm. During Lent of 780, however, Leo IV's policies on iconophiles became much harsher. He ordered for a number of prominent courtiers to be arrested, scourged, tonsured, and tortured after they were caught venerating icons.

Prior to the death of her husband, Irene appears to have accepted the prevailing iconoclasm, regardless of her private beliefs. During this period, her activities are unknown, recorded only in later obscure accounts. According to the 11th-century historian George Kedrenos, who wrote many centuries after Irene's death, this crackdown on iconophiles began after Leo IV discovered two icons hidden underneath Irene's pillow. Leo IV launched an investigation and discovered the courtiers who had brought the icons. He had them tortured and scolded Irene for violating the law and breaking with her faith. Irene insisted that she had not known the icons were there. After the incident, Leo refused to have marital relations with Irene ever again. Lynda Garland, a historian of the Byzantine Empire, states that this story too closely resembles a different story told about the later empress Theodora, wife of Theophilos, to be historically true. Nonetheless, she maintains that it is possible that Irene may have been trying to fill the palace with supporters of iconophilism, which may have triggered Leo IV's crackdown.

== Regent and empress ==
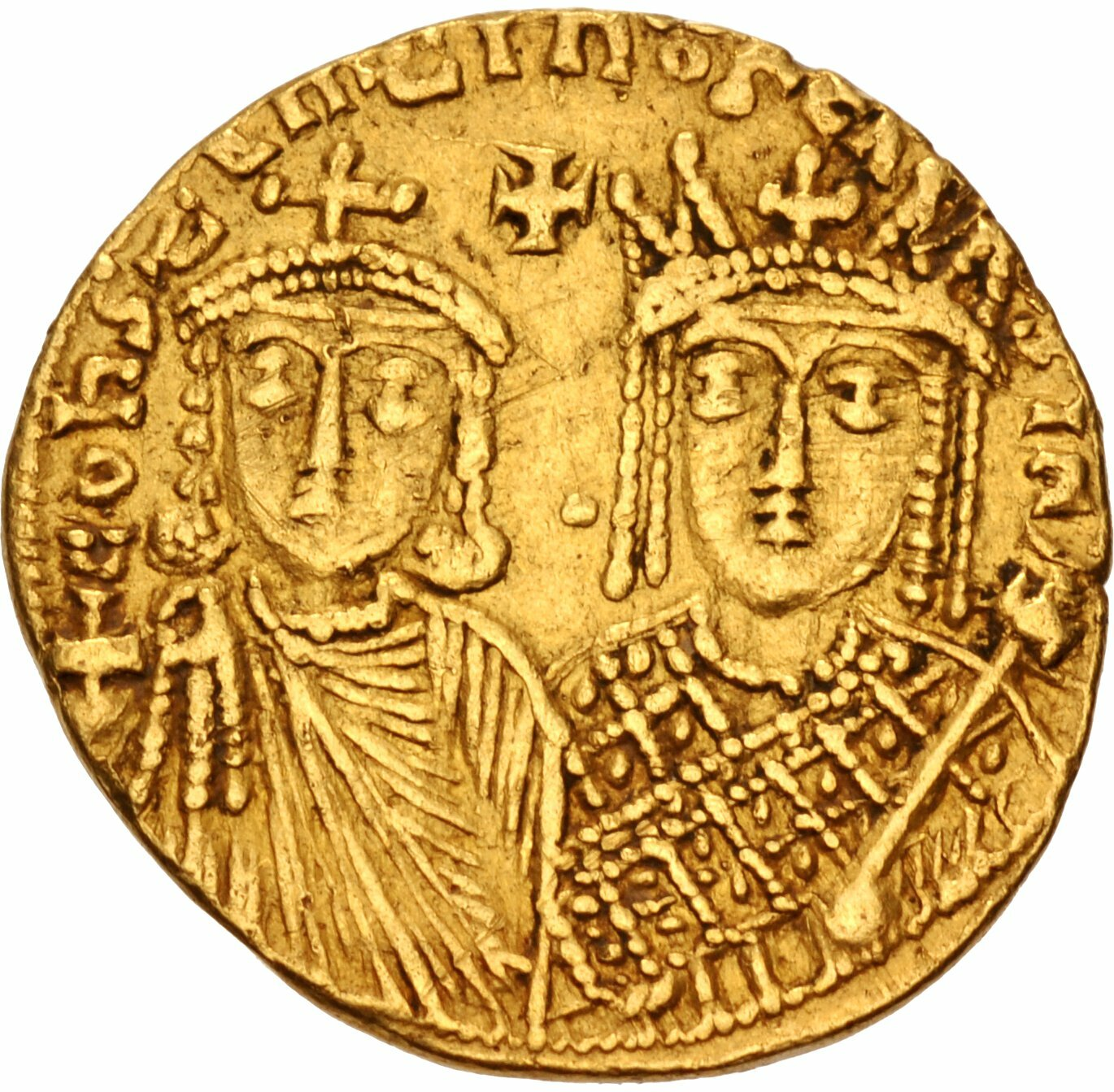
Gold solidus showing Irene as regent along her son Constantine VI; Irene took control of the throne and ruled the empire solo until 790.

When Leo IV died on 8 September 780, rumors were circulated claiming that he had died of a fever after putting on the jeweled crown from the Great Church that had been dedicated by either Maurice (r. 582–602) or Heraclius (r. 610–641). It is uncertain whether Irene herself had promoted this rumor, perhaps in an attempt to smear her iconoclast husband's memory. Quickly after Leo IV's death, Irene became regent for their nine-year-old son Constantine VI and secured the throne for him by crushing the usurpation plots in favour of Leo's brothers in the following month.

In October, only six weeks after Leo IV's death, Irene was confronted with the conspiracy led by a group of prominent dignitaries that sought to raise Caesar Nikephoros, a half-brother of Leo IV, to the throne. Irene had Bardas (the former strategos of the Armeniac Theme), Gregory (the logothete of the dromos), and Konstantinos (the count of the excubitors) scourged, tonsured, and banished. She replaced all of them with dignitaries who were loyal to her. She had Nikephoros and his four brothers ordained as priests, a status which disqualified them from ruling, and forced them to serve communion at the Hagia Sophia on Christmas Day 780. On the same day, Irene returned the crown her husband had removed as part of a full imperial procession. Possibly hoping to placate supporters of her husband's family, Irene is reported to have proposed that Leo IV's sister Anthousa should join her as co-regent, but Anthousa is said to have rejected the offer.

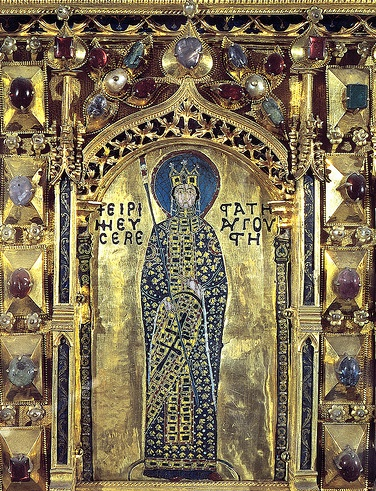
Irene of Athens (or Irene Doukaina) in the Pala d'Oro, Venice.

From the beginning, Irene seems to have taken more power for herself than was traditionally expected of female regents. Her earliest coins depict both herself and her son Constantine VI on the obverse, listing them as co-rulers rather than as ruler and regent. Furthermore, Irene is shown holding the orb, not Constantine, and only Irene's name is listed on the obverse of the coin, with Constantine VI's name only listed on the reverse, the less important side. Also, in all orders, both oral and written, Irene's name took precedence over her son's name, and she signed her orders in the name of the emperor in her own right and her name took precedence in the oath of allegiance. Apart from that, she did not allow Constantine any voice in public affairs. At the same time, Irene appears to have been well aware that her position as regent was insecure. The last female regent of the Byzantine Empire had been Empress Martina, who had only managed to survive as regent for less than a year before her tongue was cut out and she was exiled to the island of Rhodes. Most people were probably expecting that Irene's reign would come to a similarly swift and bloody end.

In 781 Irene accused the stratēgos of Sicily, Elpidius, of participating in the conspiracy involving her brother-in-law Nikephoros. The military in Sicily prevented his arrest, so Irene sent a fleet which succeeded in defeating the rebels. Elpidius fled to Africa, where he defected to the Abbasid Caliphate. The fact that this revolt appears to reflect personal ambition or political conflicts centring in the capital, rather than local separatism, demonstrates the loyalty of the island to the Empire.

After the success of Constantine V's general, Michael Lachanodrakon, who foiled an Abbasid attack on the eastern frontiers, a huge Abbasid army under Harun al-Rashid invaded Anatolia in summer 782, reaching Chrysopolis on the Asiatic side of the Bosphorus The stratēgos of the Bucellarian Theme, Tatzates, defected to the Abbasids, and Irene had to agree to pay an embarrassing annual tribute of 100,000 dinars to the Abbasids.

In 783, Staurakios, eunuch and logothete of the dromos under Irene, led a successful campaign against the Sclaveni of Thessaly, Greece and the Peloponnese, returning with booty and captives. In 784, Irene capitalized on Constantine V's successes in Thrace and ordered Veria and Anchialos to be "rebuilt".

By 786, Harun, then the Abbasid Caliph, had made Raqqa his residence in order to secure control over the frontier. In 797/798, the Abbasids were said to have reached the Bosphorus again, but agreed to negotiate with the Byzantines due to the threat of the Khazars in the north. Nonetheless, he engaged in a campaign of assiduously strengthening the frontier with new districts and strongholds (al-Awasim), specifically from Cilicia through Germanikeia to Melitene. There was significant settlement and economic activity in the frontier region by the Abbasids, which was not typical in the time of the Umayyad Caliphate. Harun proved to be a capable commander and Irene and her successor Nikephoros I struggled to effectively resist his campaigns.

=== Ending iconoclasm ===
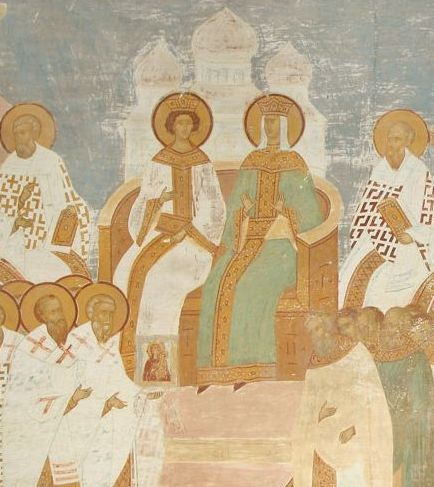
15th century mural depicting Irene and Constantine VI at the Seventh ecumenical council of 787.

Irene's most notable act was the restoration of the veneration of icons (images of Christ or the saints). Upon the death of the iconoclast Patriarch Paul IV of Constantinople, Irene elevated Tarasios, one of her partisans and former secretary, to the position of Patriarch of Constantinople in 784. As he was a layman, Pope Adrian I disapproved of his election. Irene and Tarasios summoned two church councils to solemnize the reversal of imperial policy to iconodulia. The first of these, assembled on 1 August 786 in the Church of the Holy Apostles at Constantinople, was dispersed by iconoclast tagmata (battalions stationed in the city) who were backed by iconoclast bishops. In autumn, Irene ordered them to respond to an alleged Arab attack in Asia Minor, then reconstituted the tagmata with soldiers from the thematic corps. Tarasios dealt with the episcopal opposition by allowing notoriously iconoclast bishops to retain their positions so long as they made a public admission of error, and also by disguising two eastern monks as envoys of the patriarchs of Antioch and Jerusalem, to justify the council's claim to ecumenical status. On 1 October 787, the monks and bishops assembled at Nicaea, a symbolic location as the site of the First Council of Nicaea in 325, to convene the seventh ecumenical council, which formally declared the veneration of icons as an article of faith, reuniting the Eastern church with that of Rome, which was signified by Adrian I's sending of two papal legates.

The council determined that the honorary veneration (timētikē proskynēsis) of the holy icons was permitted, and that the true adoration (alēthinē latreia) was reserved for God alone. It further stated that the honor paid to the icon eventually passes over to the individual that it represents, thus, veneration of an icon could not be idolatrous as the iconoclasts believed. The iconodule position was not justified by Christological arguments (as in the Council of Hieria of 754), rather, the antiquity of iconodulia and the Incarnation of Christ, which was said to make acceptable the depiction of Christ, were emphasized.

The Libri Carolini states that the ruling of the council against iconoclasm led to "civil war" within the Empire, and other ninth-century iconodule sources condemn clergymen and laymen who remained iconoclasts. While the council greatly improved relations with the papacy, it did not prevent the outbreak of a war with the Franks, who took over Istria and Benevento in 788. In spite of these reverses, Irene's military efforts met with some success: in 782 her favoured courtier Staurakios subdued the Slavs of the Balkans and laid the foundations of Byzantine expansion and re-Hellenization in the area. Nevertheless, Irene was constantly harried by the Abbasids, and in 782 and 798 had to accept the terms of the respective Caliphs al-Mahdi and Harun al-Rashid.

== Fall and return to throne ==
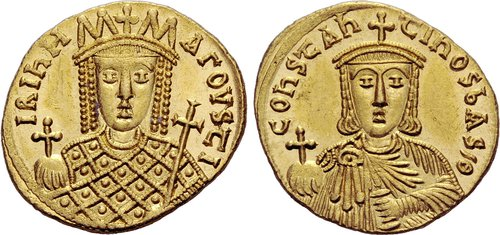
Gold solidus showing Irene with the title Augusta (empress) and the adult Constantine VI with the title Basileus (emperor) as co-rulers in c. 793–797 after Irene's return to the throne.

As Constantine VI approached maturity he began to grow restless under the autocratic sway of his mother. In 787, the plans for the marriage of Constantine and Rotrude, daughter of Charlemagne, were aborted, and in 788, Irene chose Maria of Amnia as a wife for him, beginning their unhappy marriage. In November 788, Irene suffered losses to the Bulgars and the failure of the expedition to Calabria, weakening her position. Although Constantine had reached the age of majority, Irene continued to administer the affairs of state in his place and was autocratess of the Romans.

Constantine no longer accepted his secondary status and attempted to free himself by force. He plotted with his supporters, including Peter, a magistros and confidant of Constantine V, against Irene's advisers, especially Staurakios, who he planned to exile to Sicily. In early 790, Staurakios discovered the plot and informed Irene, who arrested the plotters, confined Constantine to his quarters and demanded that the army across the Empire take an oath of fidelity in her name alone. Irene also tried to convince the army to legitimize her absolute power over the state. The discontent which this caused swelled into open resistance and at first the Armeniacs refused to swear an oath to Irene alone but rather to Constantine and Irene. She sent the Armenian commander Alexios Mosele to persuade the Armeniacs, but they instead deposed their stratēgos (who was appointed by Irene) and proclaimed Alexios the new stratēgos. When word of this spread throughout Asia Minor, other soldiers followed suit and deposed their commanders, marching into the Opsician Theme outside Constantinople. Irene was pressured to release Constantine, who was then proclaimed sole ruler in November 790 with the support of the military.

Constantine restored his supporters including Michael Lachanodrakon, the famed general of Constantine V, and banished Staurakios and another eunuch and adviser to Irene, Aetios, to the Armeniac Theme. He confined Irene to her palace but did not formally depose her. He began a distinct foreign policy from his mother, beginning campaigns against the Bulgars in April 791 and the Arabs in September. In a hollow semblance of friendship, Constantine restored Irene's titles and confirmed her position as ruler in 792, even recalling Staurakios from exile. As a result, the official Irene-Constantine duumvirate began. The title of "basileus" was bestowed on Irene as "co-emperor" with her son Constantine VI when he readmitted her to imperial power in 792. Constantine proved incapable of sound governance, and suffered a humiliating defeat at the hands of Kardam of Bulgaria in the Battle of Marcellae of 792. A plot developed in favor of his uncle, the Caesar Nikephoros (son of Constantine V). Following the advice of Irene and Staurakios, Constantine had his uncle's eyes put out and the tongues of his father's four other half-brothers cut off. His former Armeniac supporters revolted after he had blinded their stratēgos Alexios due to alleged involvement in the plot. They also disapproved of Irene's return as co-ruler. Constantine crushed this revolt with extreme cruelty in 793.

In summer 793, Arab raiders captured the important fortresses of Kamachon and Thebasa in Asia Minor; however, a larger force, accompanied by the rebellious former stratēgos of Sicily, Elpidius retreated due to an early winter in 794, and Constantine defeated an Arab army in 795. Nevertheless, Arab raiders reached Amorion in 796, Ankara and Malagina in 798 and Ephesos in 799. Constantine personally led a force to meet Abbasid Caliph Harun al-Rashid (r. 786–809), but was sabotaged by agents of Irene who falsely reported an Arab retreat, prompting Constantine himself to retire. In 796, Constantine partially compensated for his previous losses against the Bulgars by ceasing to pay the tribute extracted after Marcellae and avoiding military defeat thereafter. The Balkan frontier was in general successfully stabilized by the Byzantines in this period.

=== Moechian controversy and conspiracy to depose Constantine VI ===
Despite their collaboration, rivalry remained between the two co-rulers. Irene's faction also returned, with her powerful eunuch minister Staurakios once again at the helm, they began to take revenge on anyone who had opposed them in the past or present. The moechian controversy (from moicheia, "adultery") was begun in 795, when Constantine forced his wife Maria to enter a convent because she allegedly attempted to poison him. He then married his mistress Theodote, which was technically an act of adultery. Patriarch Tarasios of Constantinople only offered a light penance for Constantine and Theodote, which caused monks of the monastery of Sakkoudion including Theodore the Stoudite to condemn the union and excommunicate Tarasios. Constantine closed the monastery and banished Theodore to Thessaloniki. Theodore was a prestigious and influential figure, so his opposition to Constantine was significant.

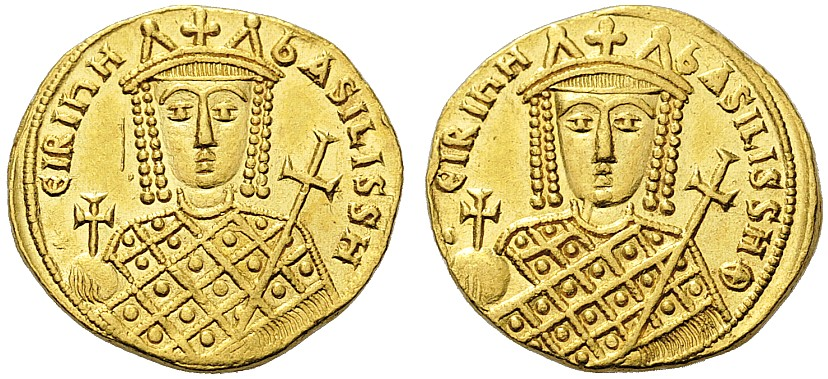
Irene was the only sovereign in the history of the Empire to place her image on both sides of imperial coinage, whereas her predecessors featured their ancestors to symbolize dynastic rule.

In 797, Irene exploited the controversy to prepare the overthrow of her son. She bribed palace officers to remain neutral and encouraged monastic opposition to the marriage. On 17 July, her agents attempted to capture Constantine as he was travelling by boat from Constantinople to his summer residence. He fled to Pylae, but Irene persuaded her supporters there to capture him. On 19 August, Constantine was blinded and confined to a monastery. It is unknown whether he managed to survive this event. (Note: The Oxford Dictionary of Byzantium gives 19 April, but this is a mistake. Theophanes the Confessor writes: "[They] reached the City on Saturday morning, 15 August." The 15th was Tuesday, so the correct date would be August 19.) Tarasios was reconciled with Theodore, who was made the abbot of the Monastery of Stoudios and became one of Irene's most loyal supporters.

Although it is often asserted that, as monarch, Irene called herself "basileus" (Greek: βασιλεύς), "emperor", rather than "basilissa" (Greek: βασίλισσα), "empress", in fact there are only three instances where it can be proven that she used the title "basileus": two legal documents in which she signed herself as "Emperor of the Romans" and a gold coin of hers found in Sicily bearing the title of "basileus". In relation to the coin, the lettering is of poor quality and the attribution to Irene may be problematic. She used the title "basilissa" in all other documents, coins, and seals.

== Relations with the Carolingian Empire ==
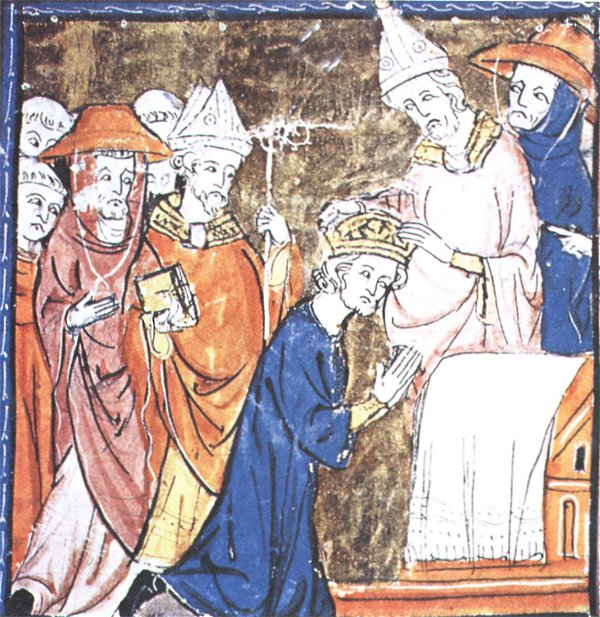
Refusing to recognize Irene's claim to be Roman Emperor, Pope Leo III crowned Charlemagne as Emperor of the Romans.

Irene's unprecedented position as an empress ruling in her own right was emphasized by the coincidental rise of the Carolingian Empire in Western Europe, which rivaled Irene's Byzantium in size and power. In 773, Charlemagne invaded Italy, annexing the Kingdom of the Lombards, in order to neutralize a threat to his succession in the form of his late brother Carloman I's wife and sons, who fled to the Lombard court in Pavia when Charlemagne seized his kingdom. He also campaigned against the Saxon tribes in northern Germany for more than thirty years, annexing their territory and compelling them to convert to Christianity, and defeated the Avars in Central Europe. In what is known as the Carolingian Renaissance, Charlemagne increasingly modelled his rule after that of the Roman emperors, sponsoring construction programs in conscious imitation of Roman and Byzantine architecture, as well as intellectual and artistic revival in general. His father Pepin the Short had reformed the currency and standardized weights, tightening royal control over mints.

As early as 781, Irene began to seek a closer relationship with the Carolingian dynasty and the Papacy in Rome, and Charlemagne's conquest of Pavia had allowed for renewed relations with the Byzantines. Through the eunuch Elissaeus, Irene negotiated a marriage between her son Constantine and Rotrude, a daughter of Charlemagne by his third wife Hildegard. During this time Charlemagne was at war with the Saxons, and would later become the new king of the Franks. Irene went as far as to send an official to instruct the Frankish princess in the "language and literature of the Greeks and [...] in Roman imperial ways", according to Theophanes. According to Charlemagne's biographer Einhard, he could not bear to lose his daughter and broke off the engagement. However, it is also possible that the new Frankish-Byzantine border, along with the oscillating allegiance of the powerful Duchy of Benevento, soured relations.

In 787, Pope Adrian I informed Charlemagne of reports of Byzantine invasion to restore Adalgis, the deposed Lombard king, with the support of Benevento, and drive the Franks from Italy. The invasion began in 788, but the Duke of Benevento sided with the Franks and defeated the Byzantines in Calabria. Alcuin of York claimed that 4,000 Byzantines were killed and 1,000 captured, including Patriarch Tarasios' brother, Sisinnius. The defeat led to a breakdown of Frankish-Byzantine relations. In 798, Irene diplomatically secured the return of Sisinnius.

From 797, Irene once again attempted to normalize relations with the Franks, and a Byzantine legation arrived in the Frankish court in 798. However, on Christmas Day, 800, Charlemagne was crowned emperor by Pope Leo III. The clergy and nobles attending the ceremony proclaimed Charlemagne Augustus. In support of Charlemagne's coronation, some argued that the imperial position was actually vacant, deeming a woman unfit to be emperor; however, Charlemagne made no claim to the Byzantine Empire. Whether he actually desired a coronation at all remains controversial—Einhard related that Charlemagne had been surprised by the Pope—but the Byzantine Empire felt its role as the sole Roman Empire threatened and began to emphasize its superiority and its Roman identity. In 802, there were reports of a possible Frankish invasion of Sicily, to which Irene responded by sending a legation under the spatharios Leo. However, the campaign was abandoned and the Franks resumed marriage negotiations with the Byzantines.

Relations between the two empires remained difficult. The coronation was viewed by the Byzantines as merely another Italian usurpation against imperial authority. Rather than opting for a military response, Irene maintained her contacts and endeavored to bring about a marriage between herself and Charlemagne, which was reciprocated to some degree by his court. However, as reported by Theophanes the Confessor, the scheme was frustrated by Aetios, eunuch and favorite of Irene, who was attempting to usurp her on behalf of his brother Leo. The discussions proved fruitless by the time Irene was overthrown, and Charlemagne remained resolute in his imperial ambitions.

== Final years ==
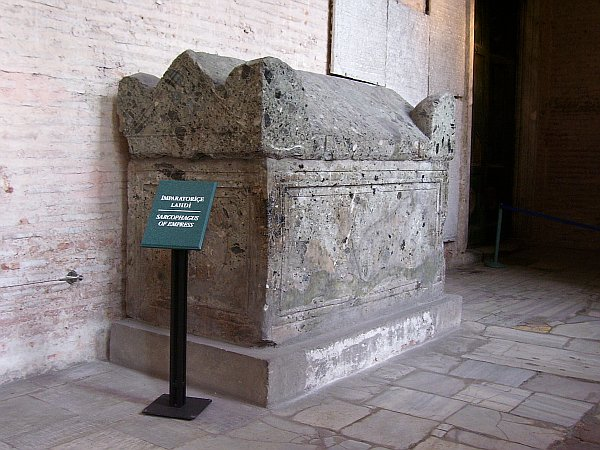
Presumed sarcophagus of Empress Irene, currently in Hagia Sophia.

In her more than five years of sole rule (797–802) Irene renewed diplomatic contact with the Franks and negotiated a tribute to Harun al-Rashid to cease hostilities, but also brutally crushed rebellions against her rule, blinding four of Constantine V's five sons. Irene's rule was popular due to her financial concessions, but weakened by factionalism, notably between two of her eunuch advisers, Staurakios and Aetios. In 800, Aetios accused Staurakios of plotting against Irene, but he died before the matter was resolved.

In October 802, officers led by the minister of finance (logothetēs tou genikou) Nikephoros deposed Irene. They were motivated both by Irene's financial laxity and benevolent tax policy as well as by the implications of a marriage alliance with the Franks. On 31 October, Nikephoros was crowned "Nikephoros I" by Patriarch Tarasios of Constantinople in the Hagia Sophia. Irene was initially exiled to the nearby island of Prinkipo, but was suspected of plotting with Aetios, and was soon banished to Lesbos, where she supported herself by spinning wool. She died in Lesbos the following year, on 9 August 803; her remains were later moved to the Church of the Holy Apostles in Constantinople.

== Assessment and legacy ==
Irene's reign represents the decline of the Isaurian dynasty. The legacy of the first and greatest Isaurian emperors, Leo III and Constantine V, was the rescue of the Empire from destruction at the hands of the Arabs and the Bulgars, while Irene's reign saw increasing losses and threat of war. Her character also departs significantly from her Isaurian predecessors, who were typically warlike and populist. She contradicted them in the blinding of her son, abolishing of iconoclasm and military weakness. The tagmata, old guard units stationed in Constantinople who surrounded the emperor on the battlefield, were supported by Constantine V but demoted and reconstituted by Irene for frustrating the meeting of the iconodule council in 786. She elevated eunuchs to power against the imperial administration, one of the most significant of whom was Staurakios. In contrast, Constantine V supported the imperial office, which proved resilient to the political and military crises of the eighth century. It was Irene's financial laxity and benevolent tax policy that led to the palace coup by the minister of the treasury, Nikephoros, in 802, which was witnessed by Charlemagne's ambassadors.

A female relative of Irene, Theophano, was chosen by Nikephoros (r. 802–811) as the bride of his son and heir Staurakios.

Although Irene was an iconodule, Theophanes the Confessor, one of the few major primary sources of the eighth century, depicts her very unsympathetically due to his dislike of the involvement of women in imperial matters. However, Irene's zeal in restoring the icons and monasteries made Theodore the Studite praise her as a saint. He also commended her for ending the Isaurian policy of demanding payments from soldiers' widows as compensation for the loss of military personnel, in order for their households to continue receiving tax exemptions and a pension. She is listed in some Byzantine Catholic and Eastern Orthodox sources as a saint commemorated on 7 August, but her name is not found in the Menaion.

=== Media ===
H. Rider Haggard incorporated Irene as a villain in his novel The Wanderer's Necklace.

A Byzantine Empress called Irene who may be based on her appears in The Road to Miklagard by Henry Treece.

== Notes ==
Irene of Athens Isaurian dynasty Born: c. 752 Died: 9 August 803
Regnal titles
Preceded by Constantine VI	Byzantine empress-regnant 19 August 797 – 31 October 802	Succeeded by Nikephoros I
Royal titles
Preceded by Eudokia	Byzantine empress-consort 775–780	Vacant Title next held by Maria of Amnia
