= Theophano of Athens =

Wife of Staurakios, Byzantine emperor in 811

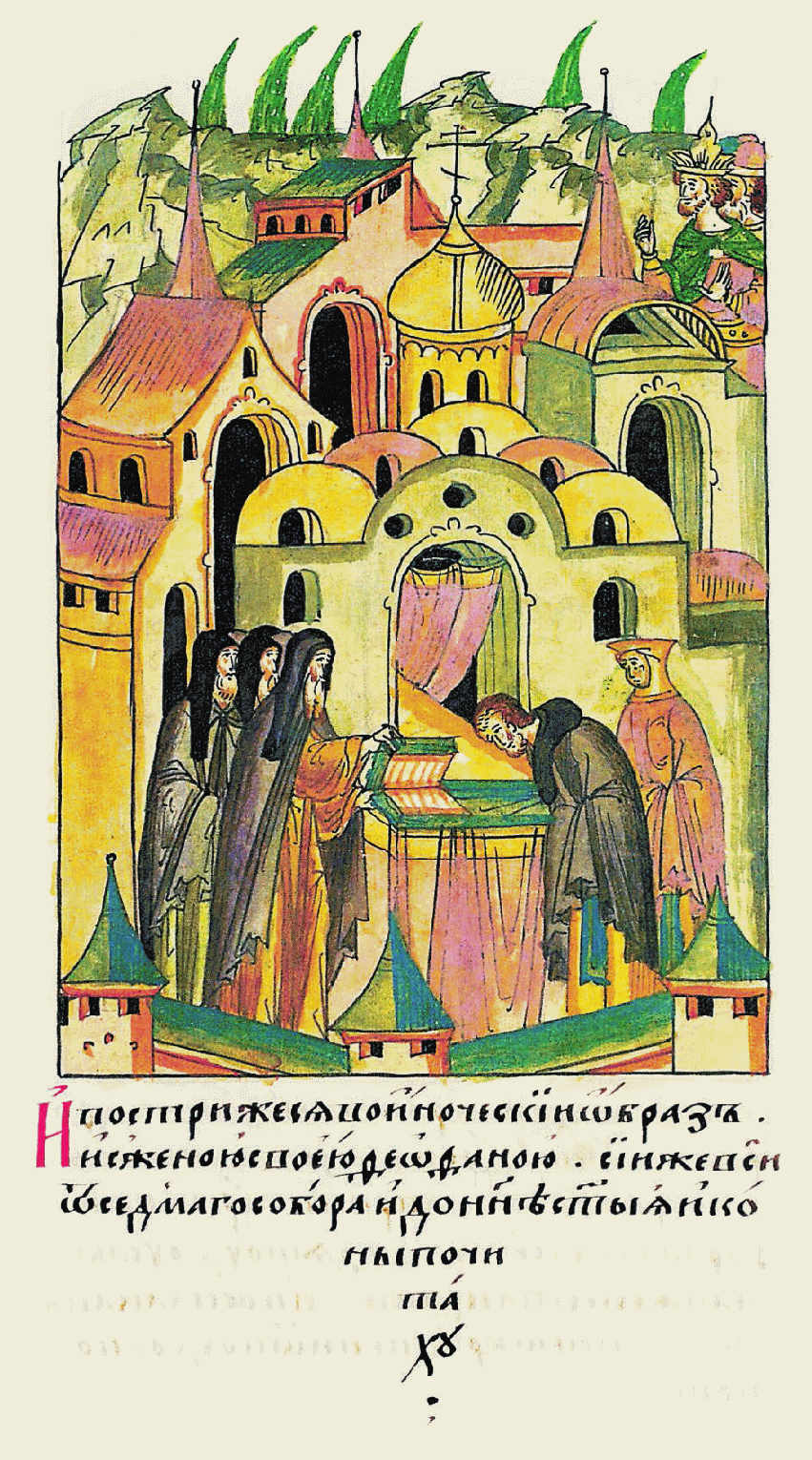
- The tonsure of Staurakios and Theophano, illustrated in the 16th century Facial Chronicle.

Empress of the Byzantine Empire
- Tenure: July–October 811
- Born: late 8th century Athens
- Died: after 811
- Spouse: Staurakios

Theophano (Greek: Θεοφανώ; died after 811) was the empress consort of Staurakios of the Byzantine Empire.

== Life ==
According to the chronicle of Theophanes the Confessor, Theophano was a relative of Irene (reigned 797–802). Both women were from Athens but the nature of their relation to each other is not known.

On 20 December 807, Theophano married Staurakios. The date of their marriage was recorded by Theophanes. Staurakios was the only known son of Nikephoros I. He was co-emperor with his father since 803. Theophano had been betrothed to another man but took place in the imperial bride-show. She was possibly chosen to legitimise the connection of the new dynasty to their predecessor.

Her father-in-law is presumed to have been a widower by the time he was elevated to the throne. In the absence of a senior empress, Theophano was the only Empress during his reign.

On 26 July 811, Nikephoros was killed while fighting against Krum of Bulgaria at the Battle of Pliska. Much of the Byzantine army was annihilated with him and the battle is considered one of the worst defeats in Byzantine history. Among the few survivors was Staurakios who succeeded as emperor.

Staurakios had not escaped the battlefield unharmed. A sword wound near his neck had left him paralyzed. Members of the imperial guard had managed to transfer him to Adrianople but he never fully recovered from his wounds. The matter of Staurakios' succession was deemed urgent and two factions emerged at court. One centered on Theophano, wife of the Emperor, who reportedly sought to succeed her husband. The other centered on his sister Prokopia who intended to place her husband Michael I Rangabe on the throne.

Staurakios was apparently about to choose Theophano as his successor. The possibility of a second Empress regnant so soon after Irene seems to have turned the nobility in support of Michael and Prokopia. Other factors were ongoing war with Krum and negotiations with Charlemagne over the legality of his imperial title. Staurakios was threatened to name Michael as his successor and abdicate at the same time. The abdication took place on 2 October 811.

Staurakios and Theophano retired to monastic life. Theophanes records that Theophano founded her own monastery. The chronicler names it with the somewhat curious name "Ta Hebraïka", which is Greek for something belonging to either the Hebrews or the Jews.

The year of her death is not known. Constantine VII recorded in the 10th century that Staurakios and Theophano shared a common grave in the monastery of the Holy Trinity in Constantinople.

Royal titles
Preceded by Theodote	Byzantine Empress consort 811	Succeeded by Prokopia
