= Bride-show =

Custom of choosing a wife

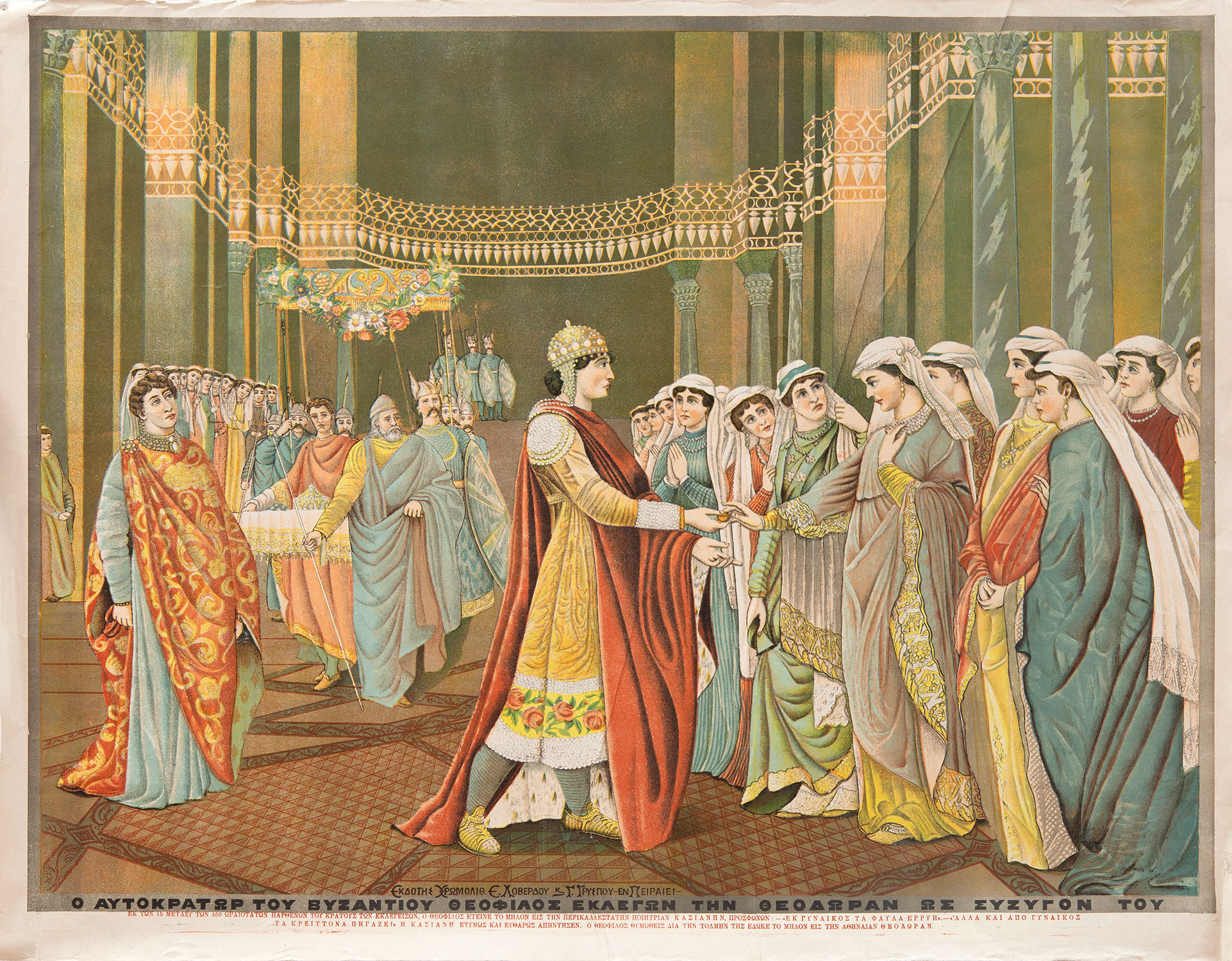
Modern representation of a Byzantine bride-show, with Theophilos choosing Theodora to be his empress

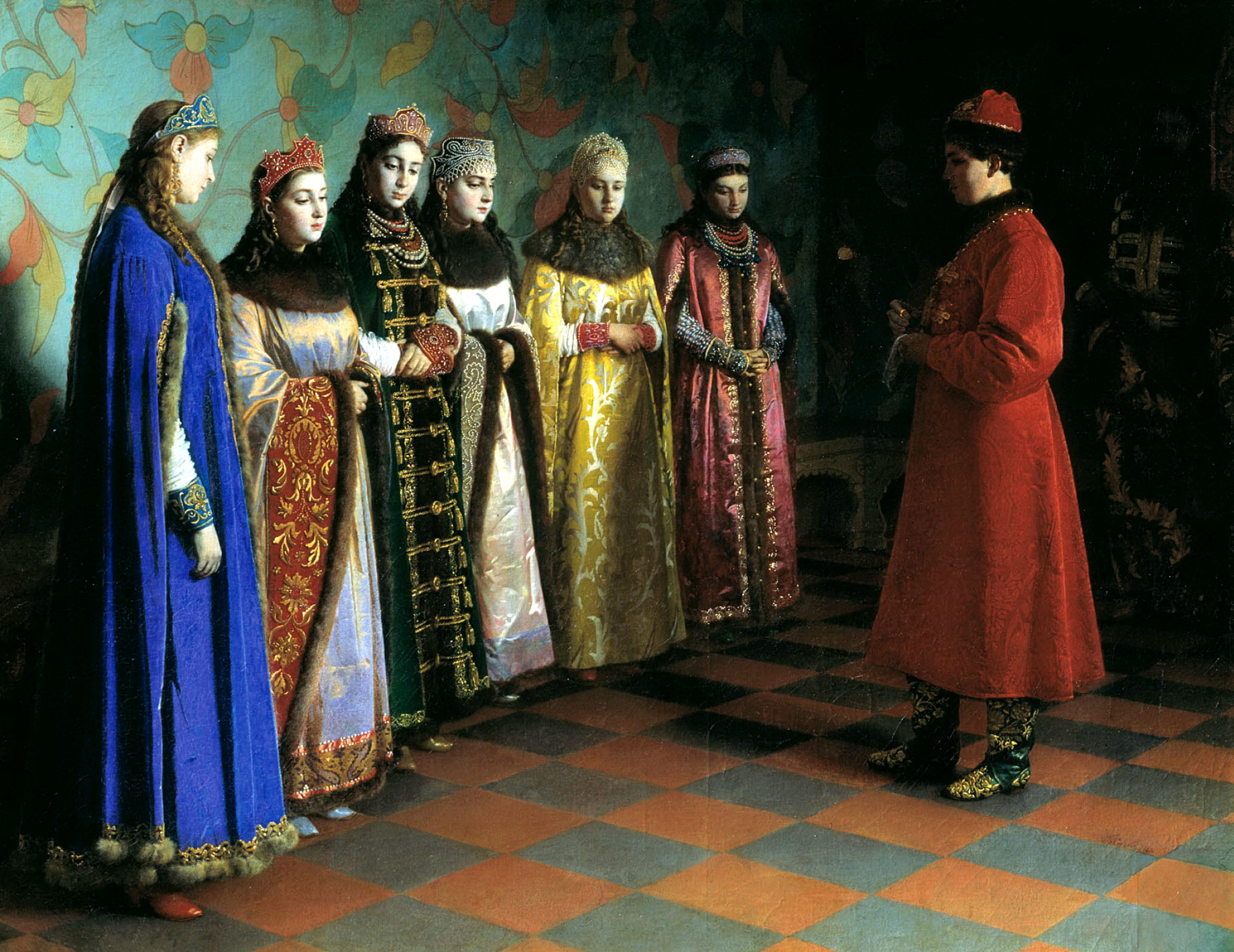
1882 painting of Tsar Alexis of Russia choosing his bride in 1648. Painting by Grigory Sedov.

The bride-show (Greek: δείχνουν οι νύφες, romanized: deichnoun hoi nyphes; Russian: смотр невест, romanized: smotr nevest; Chinese: 后妃選納) was a custom of Byzantine emperors and Russian tsars to choose a wife from among the most beautiful maidens of the country. A similar practice also existed in Imperial China.

== Byzantine Empire ==
The method to select a bride for the emperor through the method of bride-show is known to have been used at least from the 8th century onward. Irene of Athens was likely chosen for Leo IV the Khazar by this method, though it has not been confirmed.

The first recorded bridal show in Byzantium was, however, in 788, in which Maria of Amnia was selected for emperor Constantine. The method was regularly used in the 8th and 9th centuries.

Among notable bride-shows was the one in which Theodora was selected by Theophilos and Kassia rejected.

None of the empresses of the 10th century onward, however, are confirmed to have been selected this way, and the custom was surely dead by the 13th century.

== Imperial China ==
Imperial China practiced a similar method in which to choose wives for the emperor at least from the Song dynasty (960–1279) onward; in this case not just one empress, but also the various consorts and concubines of lower ranks for the emperor. During the Qing dynasty (1644–1912), daughters of the elite families were summoned to the imperial palace prior to marriage for inspection, and selected by the emperor to become his empress, secondary imperial consorts or concubines before the rest of them were released and allowed to marry.

== Muscovite Russia ==
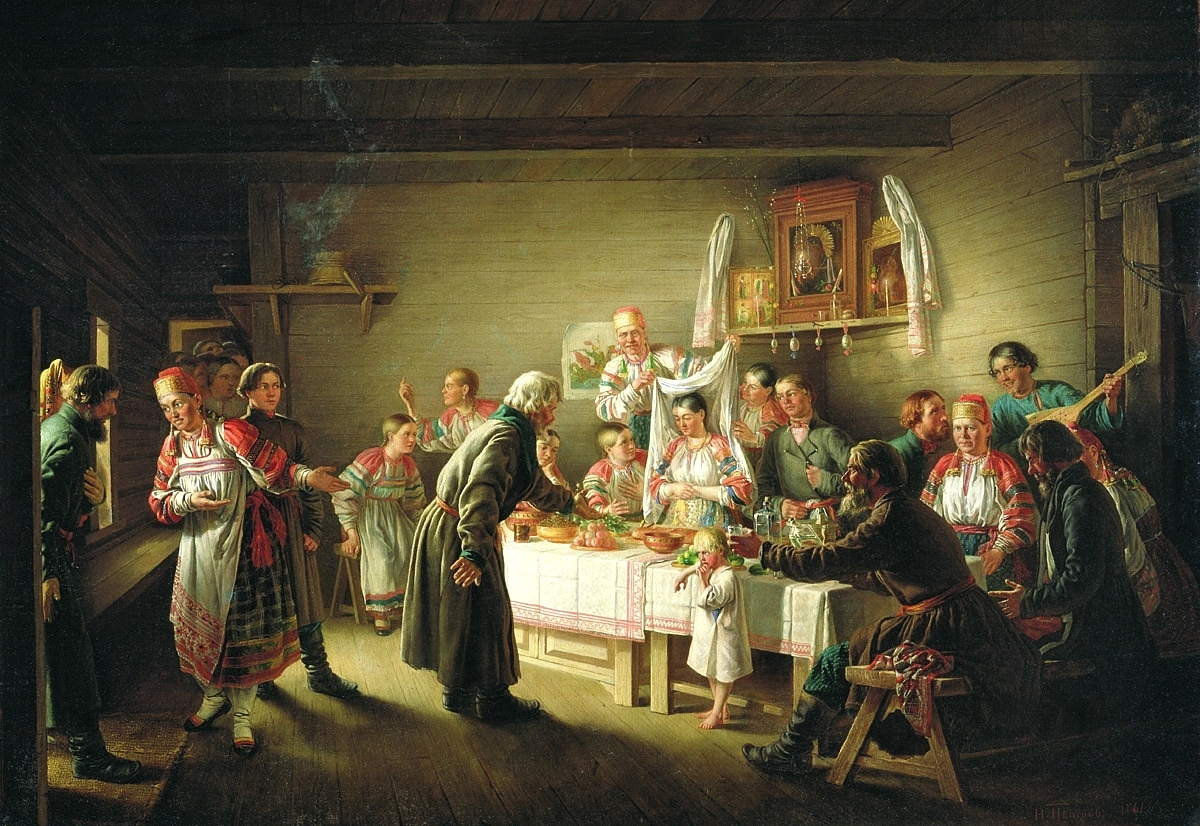
Painting from Nikolai Petrovich Petrov in 1861, the scene portrays the old tradition of the bride-show which became common in Muscovite Russia through close cultural exchange with the Byzantine Empire. Other elements of Russian culture are also recognizable in the picture such as Russian icons, Balalaika, Rushnik and Russian folk clothes.

The Byzantine method was imported to Muscovite Russia, where it became the traditional method to select a bride from the boyar nobility for the tsar in a culture where the terem otherwise secluded women of the aristocracy from men.

The method was regularly used in the 16th and 17th centuries. This was the case with the three wives of Ivan IV. The first time this method was securely recorded was in 1505, when Solomoniya Saburova was selected for Vasily III this way. The method was introduced by Vasily's Byzantine mother, Sophia Paleologue.

The last bride-show for a Russian tsar was that of Ivan V in which he chose Praskovia Saltykova in 1684. After this, the practice was abandoned, pursuant to the Westernizing reforms of Peter the Great.

== See also ==
- Beauty pageant
- Book of Esther
