= Hellas (theme) =

Province of the Byzantine Empire

Theme of Hellas Ἑλλάς, Ἑλλάδα, θέμα Ἑλλάδος
- Theme of the Byzantine Empire
- 687/695 – 1205
- Map of Byzantine Greece c. 900, with the themes and major settlements.
- Capital: Athens or Thebes
- Historical era: Middle Ages
  - Established: 687/695
  - Dissolution into smaller districts: 12th century
  - Latin Conquest: 1205
Preceded by
Achaia (Roman province)
Macedonia (Roman province)
Succeeded by
Kingdom of Thessalonica
Marquisate of Bodonitsa
Lordship of Salona
Duchy of Athens
Triarchy of Negroponte
- Today part of: Greece

The Theme of Hellas (Greek: θέμα Ἑλλάδος, Thema Hellados) was a Byzantine military-civilian province (thema, theme) located in southern Greece. The theme encompassed parts of Central Greece, Thessaly and, until c. 800, the Peloponnese peninsula. It was established in the late 7th century, and was broken up into smaller districts in the late 11th/early 12th century. The theme fell to the Crusader army led by Boniface of Montferrat in 1205.

== History ==
=== 7th–8th centuries ===
The ancient term "Hellas" was already in use in the 6th century to designate southern Greece in an administrative context, being employed in the Synekdemos as an alternative name for the Roman province of Achaea. During the late 6th and early 7th centuries, the collapse of the Byzantine Empire's Danube frontier allowed large-scale Slavic invasions and settlements to occur all over the Balkan Peninsula. From 578, Slavic raids reached Thessaly and southern Greece. Aided by the Byzantine Empire's preoccupation with the long and bloody wars with Sassanid Persia in the east, and with the Avar Khaganate in the north, the Slavs raided and settled almost at will. The Slavic settlement that followed the raids in the late 6th and early 7th centuries affected the Peloponnese in the south and Macedonia in the north far more than Thessaly or Central Greece, with the fortified towns largely remaining in the hands of the native Greek population. Nevertheless, in the first decades of the 7th century the Slavs were free to raid Thessaly and the south relatively unhindered; according to the Miracles of Saint Demetrius, in c. 615 the Slavic tribes even built monoxyla and raided the coasts of Thessaly and many Aegean islands, depopulating many of them. Some of the native Greeks fled to the fortified cities, to off-shore islands, or to Italy.

The creation of the theme of Hellas is dated to sometime between 687 and 695, during the first reign of Emperor Justinian II (r. 685–695, 705–711), probably as a direct result of his 688/689 campaign against the Slavs. The first strategos (military governor) of Hellas is attested in 695: Leontios, formerly strategos of the Anatolic Theme, who had fallen into disgrace following his defeat at the Battle of Sebastopolis, and who thereupon rebelled against Justinian and overthrew him. Although the contemporary sources do not apply the term "theme" to Hellas until after the 8th century, using the term strategia (στρατηγία, "generalcy") instead, it is almost certain that it was established from the outset as a full administrative entity, controlling those lands of the old province of Achaea that still remained under imperial control. The original extent of the theme is unclear and debated, but based on the (assumed) extent of Byzantine control, its territory must have comprised the eastern coast of the mainland (eastern Central Greece with Euboea and parts of Thessaly), possibly including the eastern Peloponnese, as well as some Aegean islands like Skyros and Kea. It is unclear whether Athens or Thebes was the province's original capital; most likely Thebes, as it certainly filled this role in the early 10th century. In the second half of the 10th century, however, the strategos' seat was transferred to Larissa.

Given its lack of depth in the hinterland, the theme was originally probably oriented mostly towards the sea and comprised the coastal areas that the Byzantine navy was able to control. It was not until the reign of Leo III the Isaurian (r. 717–741) that major land operations are recorded, and not until the early 9th century that the re-establishment of imperial control in the hinterland was completed. Thus Justinian II settled several thousand Mardaites in Hellas, who provided garrisons and crews for local naval squadrons. The number of land troops on the other hand remained rather low throughout the theme's existence, numbering perhaps 2,000, according to the estimates of Warren Treadgold. The fleet of Hellas played a prominent role during the anti-iconoclast revolt of 726/7. During the course of the 8th century, however, imperial authority was gradually extended to the interior. The local Slavic inhabitants were Christianized and subjected to Byzantine authority, often in autonomous districts under their own archontes. This process was interrupted, but not halted, by another wave of Slavic settlement in c. 746/7 from Bulgaria; imperial possessions appear not to have been greatly affected, and the fact that in 766, Emperor Constantine V (r. 741–775) was able to call upon 500 artisans from "Hellas and the islands" to Constantinople suggests a secured and regular contact between the province and the imperial centre. The anti-Slavic expedition of the minister Staurakios in 783 restored and extended imperial control once again, especially in the Peloponnese and northern Greece. In Central Greece and Thessaly, the campaign seems to have been mostly a show of force to strengthen imperial rule and subdue the new settlers, while in the Peloponnese it probably involved actual fighting against the Slavs. Although the local Slavs of the Peloponnese were not fully subdued at this time, the gradual strengthening of imperial authority eventually led to the splitting off of the Peloponnese to form a separate theme around or soon after the year 800.

=== 9th–12th centuries ===
During the 9th and early 10th centuries, Hellas suffered from Saracen raids, especially after the conquest of Crete by the Arabs in the 820s and the establishment of the Emirate of Crete. Among the major such events, in the 880s the Arab emir of Tarsus attacked Euripos (Chalcis) but was defeated, and in 902 the Saracens under the renegade Damian of Tarsus sacked the port city of Demetrias. Ten ships from Hellas also participated in the failed attempt to recover Crete under Himerios in 911/2. In 918 and again in 923, the area was subjected to Bulgarian raids under Tsar Simeon that reached even into the Peloponnese and may have destroyed Thebes. Nevertheless, from the late 9th century on Hellas, along with the rest of Greece, shows evidence of increased prosperity, such as the increase in coinage, foundation of new towns and the establishment of new industries (most notably the silk industry in Thebes). The Saracen threat receded during the 10th century and was practically ended as the result of the Byzantine reconquest of Crete in 960–961, but the Bulgarian threat was renewed under Tsar Samuel, who occupied Thessaly in 986 and launched several devastating raids into Central Greece and the Peloponnese until his defeat at the Battle of Spercheios in 997.

During the 10th and 11th centuries, Hellas was often governed jointly with the Peloponnese under a single strategos, and as the civilian administration rose in importance, the same practice appears there as well, with protonotarioi, praetores and kritai being appointed for both themes. Thessaly appears to have been detached from Hellas and joined to the theme of Thessalonica from the early 11th century—though the Spercheios valley remained part of Hellas—until sometime in the 12th century. The strategos of Hellas is still attested for much of the 11th century, and a doux of Thebes and Euripus after the middle of the 12th century. By the end of the 11th century, the joint administration of Hellas and the Peloponnese came under the control of the megas doux, the commander-in-chief of the Byzantine navy. Due to the latter's absence from the province, however, the local administration remained under the local praetor, a position often held during this period by senior and distinguished officials like the legal scholars Alexios Aristenos and Nicholas Hagiotheodorites. Increasingly, however, smaller jurisdictions appeared within the boundaries of both themes. These eventually evolved into the smaller fiscal districts variously termed horia (sing. horion), chartoularata (sing. chartoularaton), and episkepseis (sing. episkepsis) in the 12th century, while the old themes of Hellas and the Peloponnese gradually withered away as administrative entities. The horia in particular are only attested for Greece, and appear to have been based at Larissa, Thebes and Euripus, Athens, Corinth, and Patras.

The 11th century was largely a period of peace for southern Greece, interrupted only by raids during the uprising of Petar Delyan (1040–1041), a raid by the Turkic Uzes tribe in 1064, and the unsuccessful Norman attacks into Thessaly in 1082–1083. The Italian maritime republics, with the Republic of Venice first and foremost, began to establish their presence in the region towards the end of the century, signalling the beginning of the Italians' ascendancy in maritime commerce and their gradual takeover of the Byzantine economy: in the aftermath of the failed Norman invasion, Alexios I granted the first trading privileges to the Venetians in exchange for their naval aids against Norman fleets, such as immunity from taxation and the right to set up trade colonies in certain towns including Constantinople itself. In Hellas itself Euripus, Thebes, and Athens were among those towns. Alexios' successors tried to curb these privileges with successes in part — and leading to the Venetian sacking of Euripus in 1171 in retaliation - but in 1198 Alexios III Angelos (r. 1195–1203) was forced to concede even more extensive ones, allowing the Venetians to create trade stations virtually in all cities situated close to the coast.

In 1148, the Normans under Roger II of Sicily plundered Thebes, carrying off its silk workers to Palermo. The local silk industry survived, however, and was revived, partly if not mostly with Jewish workers as attested by Benjamin of Tudela in his visit in 1165. Both Benjamin and the Arab geographer al-Idrisi describe central Greece during the middle of the 12th century as densely populated and prosperous, while Benjamin records the presence of Jewish communities in Thebes, Krisa, Euripus, Ravenica, and Zetouni (Lamia). The situation began to change towards the end of the reign of Manuel I Komnenos (r. 1143–1180), whose costly military ventures led to a hike in taxation. Coupled with the corruption and autocratic behaviour of officials, this led to a decline in industry and the impoverishment of the peasantry, eloquently lamented by the Metropolitan of Athens, Michael Choniates. This decline was temporarily halted under Andronikos I Komnenos (r. 1182–1185), who sent the capable Nikephoros Prosouch as praetor, but resumed after Andronikos' fall.

At the turn of the 13th century the Byzantine Empire's decay was in full swing. In the northwestern Peloponnese, Leo Sgouros, ruler of Nauplia, had already taken over Argos and Corinth, and launched raids into Attica. Taking advantage of the preoccupation of the imperial authorities with the Fourth Crusade, in 1204 he captured Athens, before taking over Boeotia and Thessaly without a fight. Having become the master of a quasi-independent realm encompassing much of southern Greece he then tried to legitimize his position by marrying the daughter of the deposed Alexios III Angelos at Larissa. Following the sack of Constantinople by the Crusaders in April 1204, however, the situation changed: in the same autumn, Boniface of Montferrat led a crusader army into Thessaly. Leo Sgouros tried to confront the Crusaders at the Thermopylae, but his soldiers ran away, and he retreated to his fortress bases in the Peloponnese, from where he resisted for a few more years. Boniface divided the captured lands among his followers; the main Latin states formed in the former area of Hellas were the Duchy of Athens, the Marquisate of Bodonitsa, parts of the Kingdom of Thessalonica, the Lordship of Salona, and the Triarchy of Negroponte.

== Notes ==
- a: The episkepseis were large domains allocated for the support of individuals, noble houses or churches and monasteries. The horia were districts tasked with the maintenance of warships and crews for the navy. The chartoularata were districts placed under a chartoularios, and tasked with provisioning the imperial army with horses and pack animals, and seem to have functioned as military assembly points, similar to the old metata and aplekta. They also apparently correspond with areas of Slavic settlement.

== Sources ==
- Kazhdan, Alexander, ed. (1991). The Oxford Dictionary of Byzantium. Oxford and New York: Oxford University Press. ISBN 0-19-504652-8.
- Koder, Johannes; Hild, Friedrich (1976). Tabula Imperii Byzantini, Band 1: Hellas und Thessalia (in German). Vienna: Verlag der Österreichischen Akademie der Wissenschaften. ISBN 978-3-7001-0182-6.
- Magdalino, Paul (2002) [1993]. The Empire of Manuel I Komnenos, 1143–1180 (Second ed.). Cambridge: Cambridge University Press. ISBN 9780521526531.
- Nesbitt, John; Oikonomides, Nicolas, eds. (1994). Catalogue of Byzantine Seals at Dumbarton Oaks and in the Fogg Museum of Art, Volume 2: South of the Balkans, the Islands, South of Asia Minor. Vol. 2. Washington, DC: Dumbarton Oaks Research Library and Collection. ISBN 0-88402-226-9.
- Pertusi, A. (1952). Constantino Porfirogenito: De Thematibus (in Italian). Rome, Italy: Biblioteca Apostolica Vaticana.
- Treadgold, Warren T. (1995). Byzantium and Its Army, 284–1081. Stanford, California: Stanford University Press. ISBN 0-8047-3163-2.
