= Constantine VI =

Byzantine emperor from 780 to 797

- Emperor of the Romans
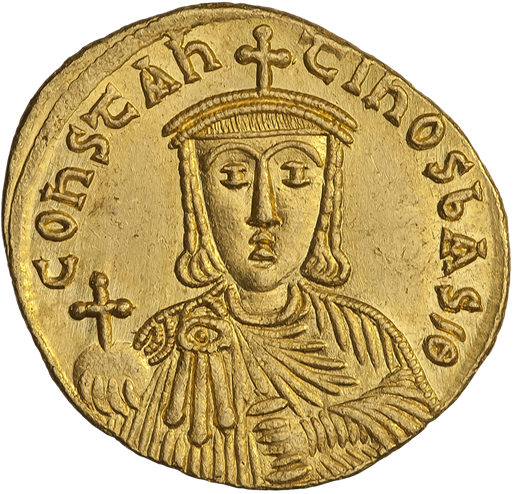
- Constantine VI – gold solidus. The inscription reads constantinos basiΘ.

Roman emperor
- Reign: 8 September 780 – 19 August 797
- Coronation: 14 April 776 (as co-emperor)
- Predecessor: Leo IV
- Successor: Irene
- Co-ruler: Irene (780–90, regent; 792–97, co-empress)
- Born: 14 January 771
- Died: c. 797, possibly before 805
- Spouse: Maria of Amnia; Theodote
- Issue Detail: Euphrosyne
- Dynasty: Isaurian
- Father: Leo IV
- Mother: Irene of Athens
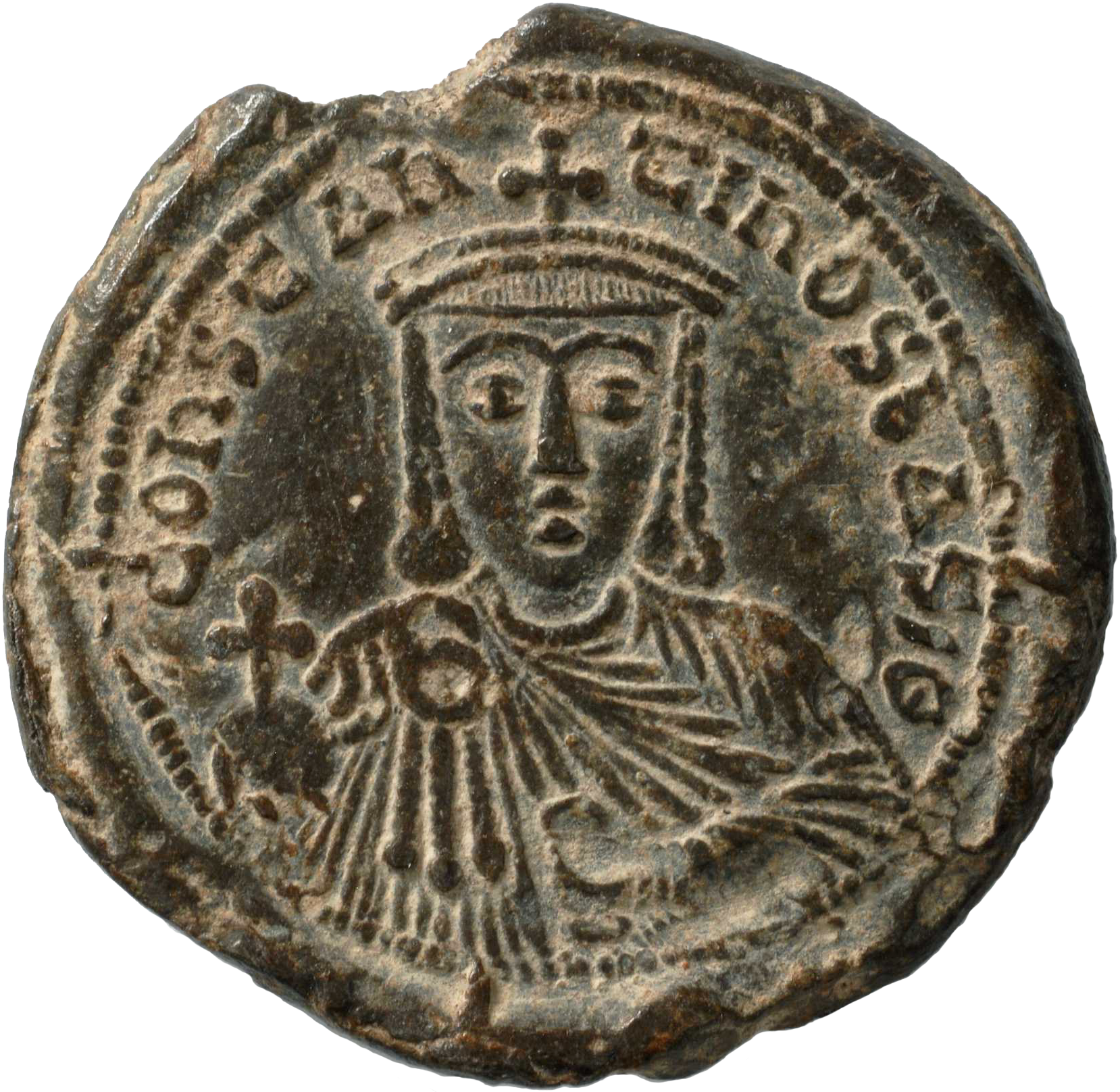
- Seal

Constantine VI (Greek: Κωνσταντῖνος, romanized: Kōnstantīnos, 14 January 771 – before 805), sometimes called the Blind, was Roman emperor from 780 to 797. The only child of Emperor Leo IV, Constantine was named co-emperor with him at the age of five in 776 and succeeded him as sole Emperor in 780, aged nine. His mother Irene exercised control over him as regent until 790, assisted by her chief minister Staurakios. The regency ended when Constantine reached maturity, but Irene sought to remain an active participant in the government. After a brief interval of sole rule Constantine named his mother empress in 792, making her his official colleague.

Constantine suffered military defeats and made controversial decisions, such as blinding his loyal general Alexios Mosele and illicitly marrying his mistress, Theodote. Taking advantage of her son's unpopularity, Irene had Constantine deposed, blinded and imprisoned in 797 and seized power for herself alone, becoming the first Empress regnant of the Empire. Constantine likely died shortly thereafter.

Constantine VI was the final ruler to be universally recognized as Roman emperor, being recognized as such by both the Empire which he ruled in the east, the papacy and the Western European powers over which the pope held suzerainty. The Romans' ability to protect the Papacy had waned following the Arab Conquests, leading the Papacy to increasingly seek protection from the Franks. This culminated in 800 when Pope Leo III, who owed his power and position to the Franks, crowned Charlemagne as 'Emperor of the Romans'. Based on the assertion that a woman could not be Empress in her own right, this laid the foundations of a new polity, independent of the East, that would evolve into the Holy Roman Empire.

According to Roman sources, the rebel Thomas the Slav (c. 760–823) claimed to be Constantine VI in an effort to gain support against Michael II. However, most modern scholars dismiss this as a later fabrication.

== Early life and the regency of Irene ==
Constantine VI was the only child of Emperor Leo IV and Irene. Constantine was crowned co-emperor by his father in 776, and succeeded as sole emperor in 780, at the age of nine. Due to his minority, Irene and her chief minister Staurakios exercised the regency for him.

In 787, Constantine, then sixteen-years-old had signed the decrees of the Second Council of Nicaea, but he appears to have had iconoclast sympathies. In 788, Irene herself broke off the engagement of Constantine with Rotrude, a daughter of Charlemagne. Turning against Charlemagne, the Romans now supported Lombard pretender Adalgis, who had been forced into exile after the Frankish invasion of Italy. Adalgis was given command of a Roman expeditionary corps, landing in Calabria towards the end of 788 but was defeated by the united armies of the Lombard dukes Hildeprand of Spoleto and Grimoald III of Benevento as well as Frankish troops under Winiges.

After a conspiracy against Irene was suppressed in the spring of 790 she attempted to get official recognition as empress. This backfired and with military support Constantine finally came to actual power in 790, after the Armeniacs rebelled against Irene. Nevertheless, after campaigning unsuccessfully in the Balkans, Constantine restored his mother in 792 after just two years out of power and made her co-ruler.

== Reign ==
Once in control of the state, Constantine proved incapable of sound governance. Constantine himself suffered a humiliating defeat at the hands of Kardam of Bulgaria in the 792 Battle of Marcellae. A plot developed in favor of his uncle, the Caesar Nikephoros. Constantine had his uncle's eyes put out and the tongues of his father's four other half-brothers cut off. His former Armeniac supporters revolted after he had blinded their stratēgos Alexios Mosele due to alleged involvement in the plot. They also disapproved of Irene as co-ruler. Constantine crushed this revolt with extreme cruelty in 793.

He then divorced his wife Maria of Amnia, who had failed to provide him with a male heir, and married his mistress Theodote, an unpopular and canonically illegal act which sparked off the so-called "Moechian controversy". Although Patriarch Tarasios of Constantinople did not publicly speak against it, he did refuse to officiate the marriage. Popular disapproval was expressed by Theodote's uncle, Plato of Sakkoudion, who even broke communion with Tarasios for his passive stance. Plato's intransigence led to his own imprisonment, while his monastic supporters were persecuted and exiled to Thessalonica. The "Moechian controversy" cost Constantine what popularity he had left, especially in the church establishment, which Irene took care to vocally support against her own son.

On 19 August 797, (Note: The Oxford Dictionary of Byzantium gives 19 April, but this is a mistake. Theophanes the Confessor writes: "[They] reached the City on Saturday morning, 15 August." The 15th was Tuesday, so the correct date would be August 19.) Constantine was captured, blinded, and imprisoned by the supporters of his mother, who had organized a conspiracy, leaving Irene to be crowned as first Empress regnant of Constantinople. It is unknown when exactly Constantine died; it was certainly before 805, though he may have died of his wounds shortly after being blinded (indeed, the act may have been "performed in a particularly brutal manner in order to ensure that he would not survive"). He was buried in the Monastery of St. Euphrosyne, which Irene had founded.

=== Economy ===
Although the eighth century was a period of depopulation and ruralisation, there is evidence of a degree of prosperity, for example, the written record of the very large payment of 7,200 nomismata (100 pounds of gold) by Constantine for the fair of St John at Ephesus in 795, which seems to suggest that the peasantry was industrious at the time.

== Family ==
By his first wife Maria, Constantine VI had two daughters:

- Euphrosyne (790 – after 836), who married Emperor Michael II
- Irene (789 – after July 796), who became a nun

By his mistress and then second wife Theodote, Constantine VI had two sons, both of whom died young:

- Leo (7 October 796 – 1 May 797)
- An unnamed son (posthumously 797/8 – between 802 and 808)

== Gallery ==
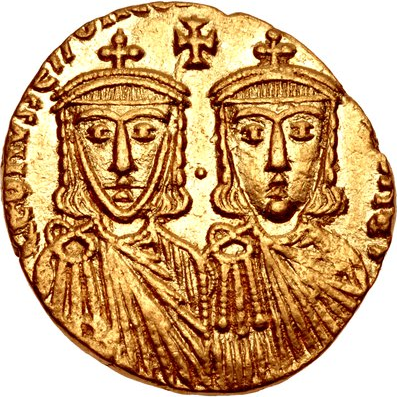
Leo IV with his son and co-emperor Constantine VI

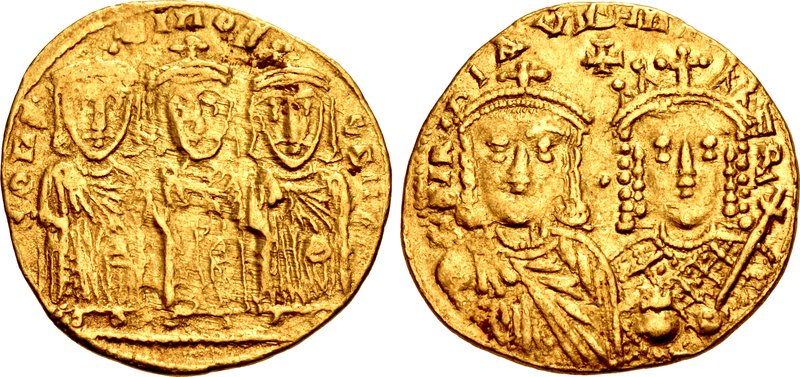
Leo III, Constantine V and Leo IV (left), with Constantine VI and Irene (right)

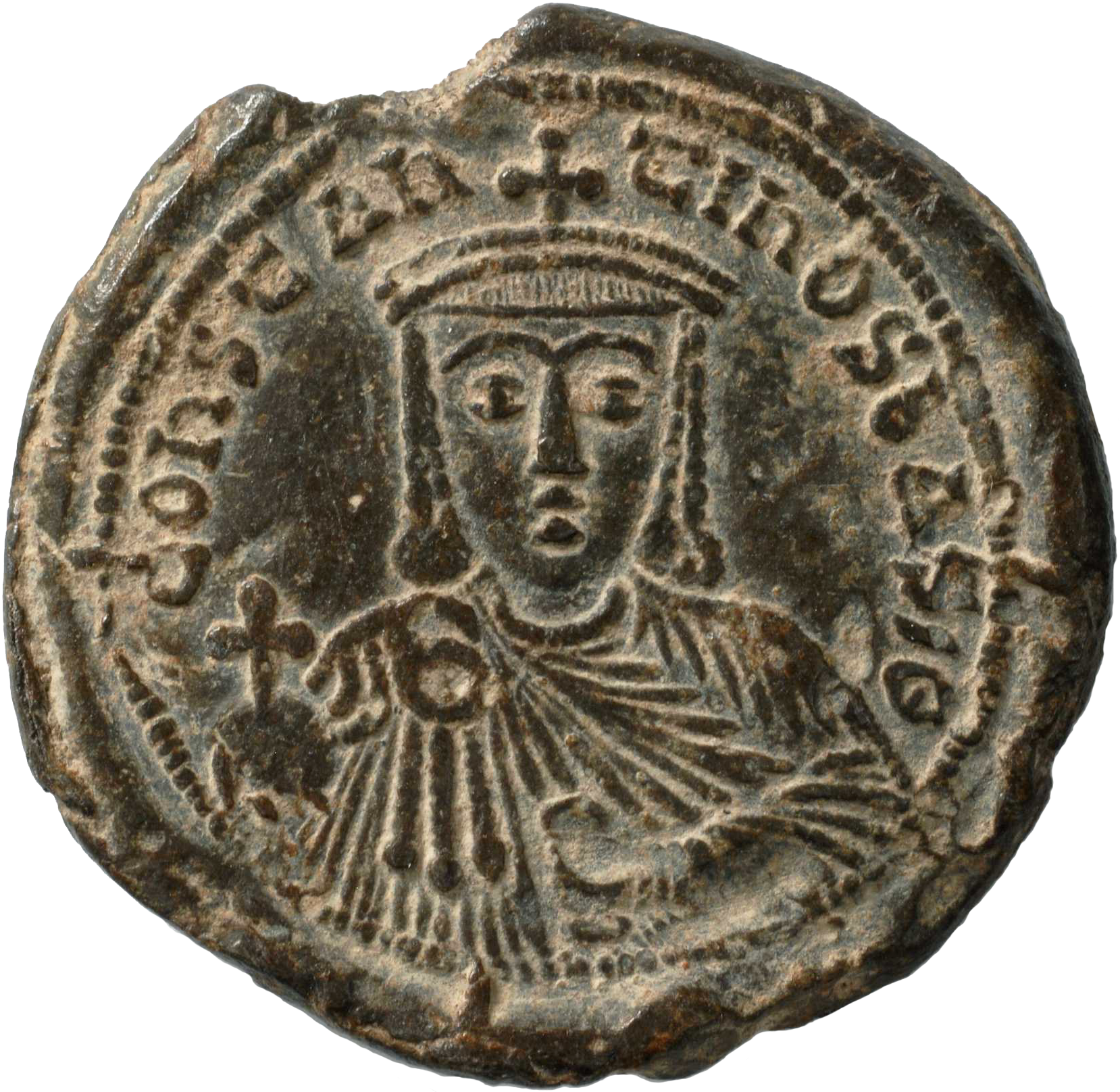
Seal of Constantine VI, c. 791

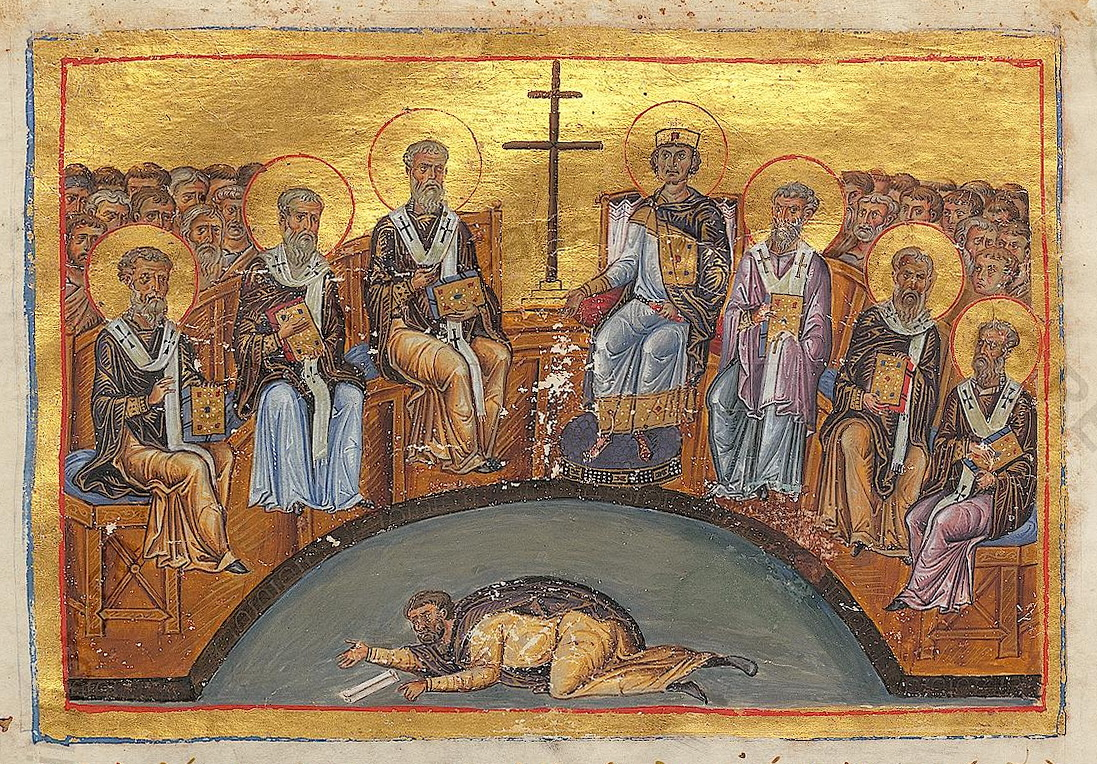
Depiction of the Second Council of Nicaea from the Menologion of Basil II, c. 1000

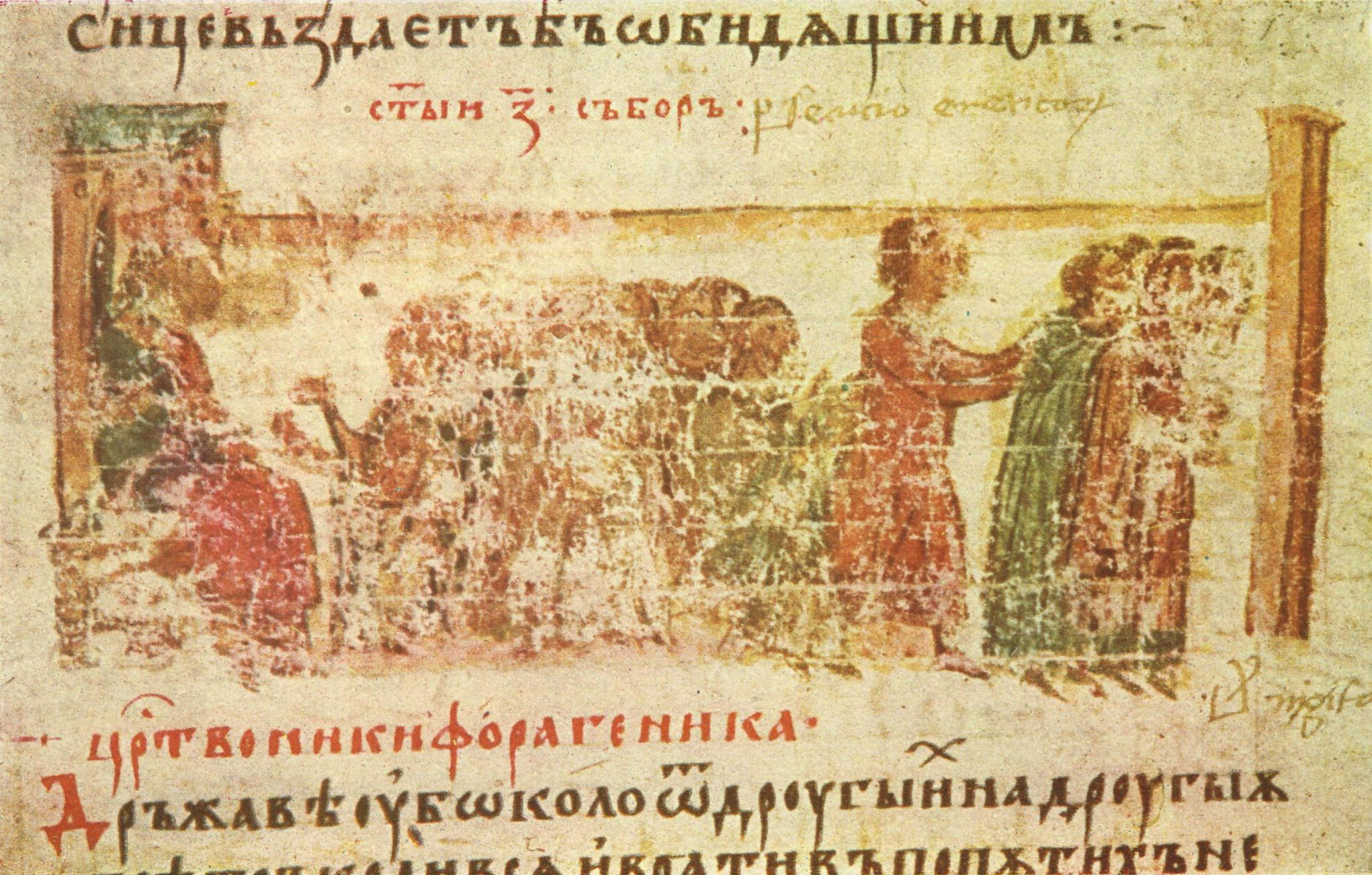
The 2nd Council of Nicaea depicted in a Bulgarian miniature of the 12th century Manasses Chronicle

== See also ==
- List of Byzantine emperors

== Notes ==
Constantine VI Isaurian dynasty Born: 14 January 771 Died: before 805
Regnal titles
Preceded by Leo IV	Byzantine emperor 8 September 780 – 19 August 797 (with Irene)	Succeeded by Irene
Political offices
Vacant Title last held by Leo IV	Roman consul 780	Vacant Title next held by Nikephoros I
