= Leo IV the Khazar =

Byzantine emperor from 775 to 780

Leo IV
- Emperor of the Romans
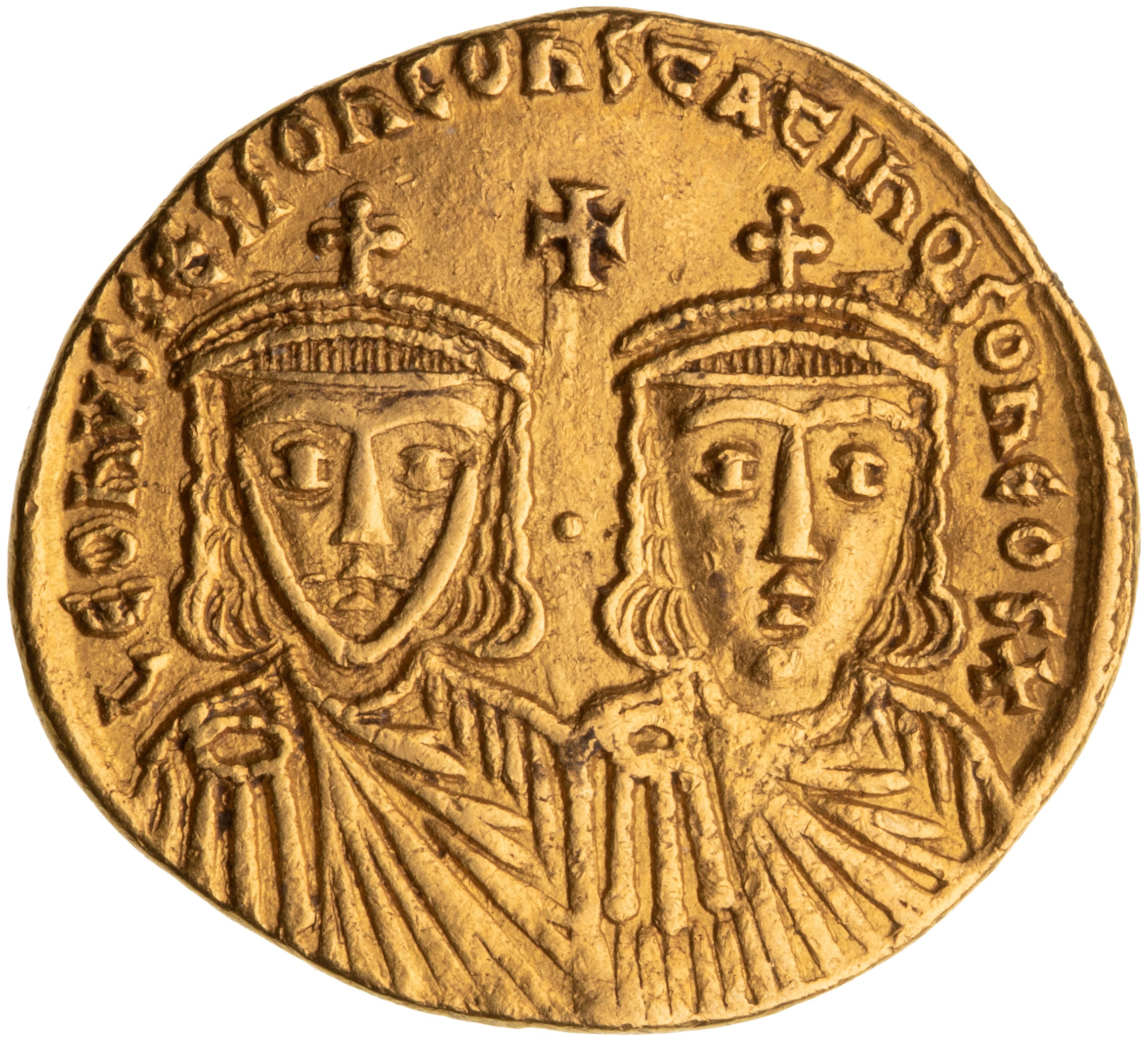
- Solidus of Leo IV and his son Constantine VI

Byzantine emperor
- Reign: 14 September 775 – 8 September 780
- Coronation: 6 June 751 (as co-emperor)
- Predecessor: Constantine V
- Successor: Constantine VI (under the regency of Irene)
- Born: 25 January 750
- Died: 8 September 780 (aged 30)
- Consort: Irene
- Issue: Constantine VI
- Dynasty: Isaurian
- Father: Constantine V
- Mother: Tzitzak

Leo IV the Khazar (Greek: Λέων ὁ Χάζαρος, romanized: Léōn ho Khazaros; 25 January 750 – 8 September 780) was Byzantine emperor from 775 to 780 AD. He was born to Emperor Constantine V and Empress Tzitzak in 750. He was elevated to co-emperor in the next year, in 751, and married to Irene of Athens in 769. When Constantine V died in September 775, while campaigning against the Bulgars, Leo IV became senior emperor. In 778 Leo raided Abbasid Syria, decisively defeating the Abbasid army outside of Germanikeia. Leo died on 8 September 780, of tuberculosis. He was succeeded by his underage son Constantine VI, with Irene serving as regent.

== Biography ==
Leo IV was born on 25 January 750 AD, to Emperor Constantine V and his first wife, Empress Tzitzak who had been given the Christian name Eirene. Because his mother was a Khazar, Leo was given the epithet 'the Khazar'. Leo was elevated to co-emperor in 751, while still an infant. He became emperor on 14 September 775, after Constantine V died while campaigning against the Bulgarian Empire.

Leo was by this point suffering from tuberculosis, which, combined with the infancy of his son, Constantine VI, gave two of Leo's half-brothers, the caesares Nikephoros and Christopher, hope of attaining the throne. These hopes were crushed when, in 776, Leo elevated Constantine to caesar, declaring him to be his successor. Shortly after this, Nikephoros and Christopher were discovered conspiring against Leo. Despite public opinion supporting the execution of the pair, Leo instead chose to pardon them, although he did exile several other plotters to Cherson.

In 776–777, Khan Telerig of Bulgaria sought refuge in Constantinople, was baptized in the presence of Leo and married a relation of the empress consort Irene of Athens. This demonstrates close relations between the Byzantine Empire and the Bulgars during Leo's reign, which were facilitated by his father Constantine V's successful campaigns against them between 760 and 775, establishing a state of peace.

Leo continued with his father's resettlement policies, relocating prisoners from cities on the Arab border (Germanikeia, Melitene and Theodosioupolis) to newly-constructed military encampments or fortresses (castra) in Thrace.

=== Campaigns against the Abbasid Caliphate ===
Caliph al-Mahdi (r. 775–785) of the Abbasids launched an invasion of the Byzantine Empire in 776 with himself present. The Byzantines retaliated in 778, invading Syria with a force made up of the armies of the multiple themes, including: the Opsikion Theme, led by Gregory; the Anatolic Theme, led by Artabasdos; the Armeniac Theme, led by Karisterotzes; the Bucellarian Theme, led by Tatzates; and the Thracesian Theme, led by the favourite commander of the Isaurian dynasty, Michael Lachanodrakon. Lachanodrakon besieged Germanikeia for a time, then lifted the siege (according to Theophanes the Confessor, he was bribed to do so) and began to raid the surrounding countryside, deporting many Jacobite Christians to Thrace. The Abbasids attacked Lachanodrakon while he was raiding, but were decisively defeated by several Byzantine armies. The Byzantine generals who led troops during this battle were given a triumphal entry when they returned to Constantinople. In 779, Leo successfully repelled an attack by the Abbasids against Asia Minor.

=== Death and succession ===
Leo died of a violent fever, due to his tuberculosis, on 8 September 780. Nine-year-old Constantine became the new emperor with Irene as his regent.

== Bibliography ==
- Auzépy, Marie-France (2008). "State of emergency (700–850)". In Shepard, Jonathan (ed.). The Cambridge history of the Byzantine Empire (c. 500–1492). Cambridge University Press. ISBN 978-0-521-83231-1.
- Bury, J. B. (2015). A History of the Later Roman Empire. Cambridge University Press. ISBN 9781108083188.
- Finlay, George (2017). The Later Byzantine Empire. Merkaba Press. OCLC 1886829.
- Kaegi, Walter E. (2008). "Confronting Islam: Emperors versus Caliphs (641–c. 850)". In Shepard, Jonathan (ed.). The Cambridge history of the Byzantine Empire (c. 500–1492). Cambridge University Press. ISBN 978-0-521-83231-1.
- Lawler, Jennifer (2011). Encyclopedia of the Byzantine Empire. McFarland. ISBN 978-0786466160.
- Melton, J. Gordon (2014). Faiths Across Time: 5,000 Years of Religious History [4 Volumes]: 5,000 Years of Religious History. ABC-CLIO. ISBN 9781610690263.
- Sophoulis, Panos (2011). Byzantium and Bulgaria, 775-831. Brill. ISBN 978-9004206953.

Leo IV the Khazar Isaurian dynasty Born: 25 January 750 Died: 8 September 780
Regnal titles
Preceded by Constantine V	Byzantine emperor 14 September 775 – 8 September 780	Succeeded by Constantine VI; Irene
Political offices
Vacant Title last held by Constantine V	Consul of the Roman Empire; 776	Vacant Title next held by Constantine VI
