= Lynda Garland =

- Born: Lynda Garland; 13 October 1955 (age 70)

Lynda Garland (born 13 October 1955) is a scholar and professor at the University of Queensland. Her research focuses on female images in the Late Antiquity period and Byzantine Society.

== Biography ==
Professor Lynda Garland is currently the Honorary Research Associate Professor in Classics at the School of Historical and Philosophical Inquiry at the University of Queensland, Australia. She was the professor of Ancient and Medieval History at the University of New England (Australia). Garland has also been teaching at the University of New England, New South Wales and working as the Head of the School of Humanities at the University of New England, Armidale.

Professor Garland studies the history from the Classical Antiquity to the Early Middle Ages. Her own research focuses on women, especially the imperial princesses and empresses, and their relationship and status within the family and society in the Byzantine period. At the same time, she has collaborated with Professor Matthew Dillion at the University of New England and collected social and historical documents of Ancient Greece and Rome. The primary documents are translated into English and compiled into sourcebooks for students and scholars in Greek and Roman History to study and use for reference.

== Books ==
- Ancient Rome: Social and Historical Documents from the Early Republic to the Death of Augustus (2015). ISBN 9780415726993
- Questions of Gender in Byzantine Society (2013). ISBN 9781409447795
- The Ancient Greeks: History and Culture from Archaic Times to the Death of Alexander (2012). ISBN 9780415471435
- Basileia: Essays on Imperium and Culture in Honour of E.M. and M.J. Jeffreys (2011). ISBN 9781876503307
- Byzantine Women AD 800–1200: Varieties of Experience (2006). ISBN 9780754657378
- Ancient Rome: From the Early Republic to the Assassination of Julius Caesar (2005). ISBN 9780415224598
- Byzantine Empresses: Women and Power in Byzantium AD 527-1204 (1999). ISBN 0415146887
- Conformity and Non-Conformity in Byzantium (1997). ISBN 9025606199
- Social and Historical Documents from Archaic Times to the Death of Socrates (c. 800–399 BC) (1994). ISBN 9780415113663
