= Rebellion of Thomas the Slav =

Rebellion of Thomas the slav
- Part of the Byzantine civil wars, Arab-Byzantine wars and Byzantine-Bulgarian wars
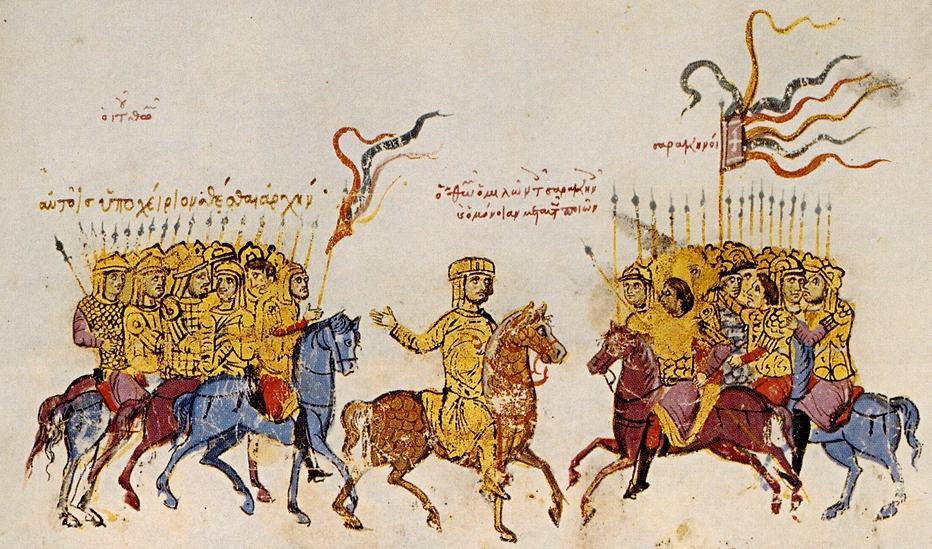
- Depiction of Thomas on horseback, dressed as a Byzantine emperor, negotiating with the Arabs, from the Madrid Skylitzes version of the chronicle of John Skylitzes
Date	December 820–October 823
Location	Asia Minor • Balkans
Result	Victory for Michael II

Belligerents
Forces of Michael II First Bulgarian Empire	Forces of Thomas Abbasid Caliphate (after 821); Principality of Iberia (Note: According to the 12th-century chronicler Michael the Syrian, the troops he assembled consisted of Arabs, Persians, Georgians, Armenians, and Abasgians.)	Abbasid Caliphate (until 821)

Commanders and leaders
Michael II; Gregory Pterotos †; Olbianos; Katakylas Khan Omurtag	Thomas the Slav (executed); Gregory Pterotos; Philip †; Anastasius Al-Ma'mun; Ashot I of Iberia (Note: Thomas the Slav received military assistance from his Caucasian allies, which historically included Iberian and Armenian contingents, sent by local leaders like Ashot I of Iberia.)	Al-Ma'mun

Strength
c. 35,000	c. 80,000 (Note: The entire standing army of the Byzantine Empire during this era was estimated to be around 118,000 to 120,000 men. At the peak of his rebellion, Thomas commanded nearly two-thirds of the Byzantine Empire’s overall territories and military assets, presenting an overwhelmingly dominant force of roughly 80,000 men.)	Depleted forces in Armenia

The Rebellion of Thomas the Slav c. 820–823 was a large-scale Byzantine civil war, between the rebel forces of Thomas the Slav and the loyalist forces of Emperor Michael II. It spanned most Asia Minor and the Balkans, as Thomas layed siege to Constantinople, before he was ultimately defeated by loyalist forces, with the backing of the Bulgars.

== Background ==
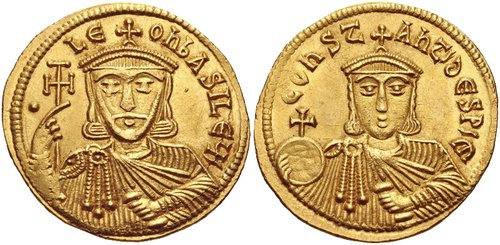
Golden solidus depicting the busts of Leo V the Armenian and his son, Constantine Symbatios

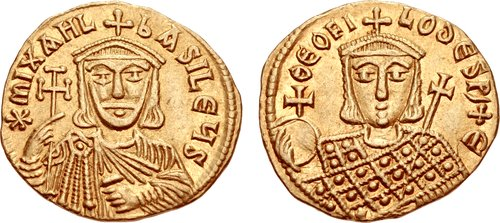
Golden solidus depicting the busts of Michael II and his son, Theophilos

Following the unsuccessful rebellion of Bardanes Tourkos against Emperor Nikephoros I in 803, Thomas fled within the Abbasid Caliphate. However, after Leo V ascended the throne, and following the abdication of Michael I Rangabe, Thomas was recalled was given command of the tourma of the foederati—a vital military division stationed within the strategically crucial Anatolikon Theme. On Christmas 820, Leo V was assassinated by the supporters of Michael II in the palace chapel. This action caused dissent across the empire, sparking revolts from the strategos of Sicily, Gregory (who was ousted and killed by Euphemius), and Thomas, who was proclaimed as emperor by the Anatolian Themes, with his base in the city of Amorium.

== Rebellion ==
Beginning of the Rebellion

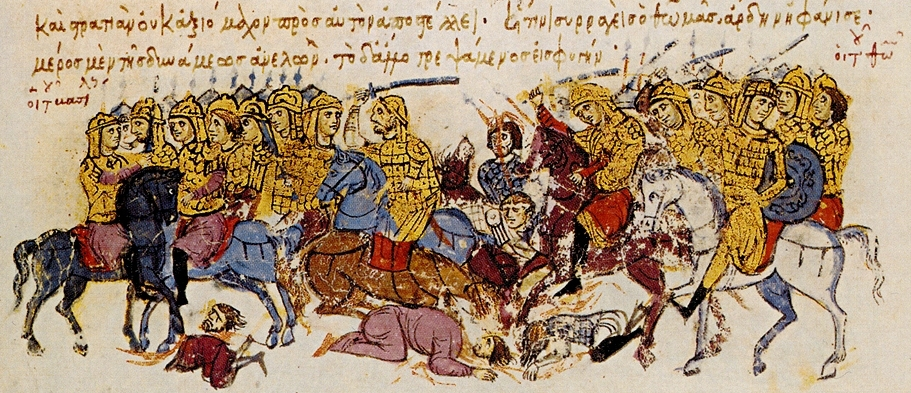
Thomas defeats a loyalist imperial force on behalf of Michael

When the soldiers of the Anatolikon Theme and their commanders were informed of Leo's deposition by Michael they refused to acknowledge the new ruler, and instead chose a popular figure among their own ranks for the throne. They chose Thomas, a possible descendant of Slavic populations settled in Anatolia over the centuries, and an old veteran who had been a strong ally and close confidant of Leo amongst his officer cadre. (Note: Vasiliev, pointing to evidence from Genesios’s narrative, believes Thomas was of Armenian background. As Armenians commonly attained positions of power in the Byzantine Empire, the sources loyal to Michael II may have fabricated the image of Thomas as being of Slavic descendant in order to portray him as having a more 'barbaric' ancestry.) As tourmarch of the foederati, Thomas portrayed himself as the champion of the common people of Anatolia, who had recently suffered from overtaxation under overbearing imperial policies, and of the army, which attracted the support he needed to quickly prepare and launch his rebellion within days to a few weeks following Leo’s assassination. Thomas' cause also took a religious dimension, as the he presented himself as an icondule restorationist against the imperial iconoclastic policies, receiving widespread support amongst both the military and civil-administrative officials in Asia Minor. Almost all of the Anatolian Themes, with the exceptions of the Opsikion and the Armeniakon, joined his rebellion. Ultimately, Thomas secured the loyalty of more than two-thirds of the empire's soldiers in Asia Minor during the opening stages of the civil war.

"The servant raised his hand against his master, the soldier against his officer, the rank-and-file soldier against his general"

— Vasiliev 1935, p.24

Byzantine themes in Anatolia c. 842

Despite the rapid progress of Thomas' rebellion, Michael maintained his powerbase in Constantinople, control over the central bureaucracy, and access to the treasury. He also took steps towards legitimising his rule by installing a new Patriarch of Constantinople, Antony I, who authenticated his sovereignty. Militarily, Michael enjoyed the support of the elite tagmatic units, in addition to all of the themes in Europe, as well as the Opsikion and Armeniakon in Asia Minor, along with the ducate of Chaldia. However, although the Armeniakon and Chaldia were accessible by sea, these territories were otherwise separated from Michael's seat of power. Michael considered possession of these northeastern territories strategically vital in countering Thomas' renegades, as he could threaten fromm there Thomas' Anatolikon heartland. He leveraged this by ordering the strategos of the Armeniakon, Olbianos, to march against Thomas with his troops. However, Thomas soundly defeated Olbianos' army in battle, a victory which he exploited with a successful counterinvasion of Michael's northeastern holdings, placing Chaldia and parts of the Armeniakon under his authority. However, before he could capture the entire theme, he was forced to divert his attention southwards to counter raids upon his lands by the Abbasids.

=== Conflict and Alliance with the Abbasids ===
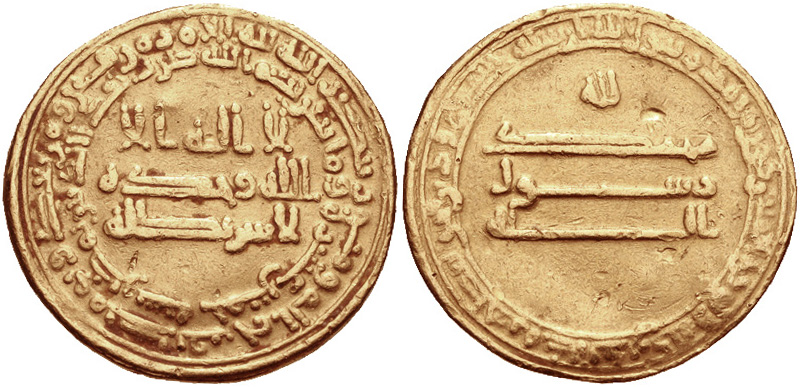
Golden dinar of caliph al-Ma'mun

In spring 821, Michael's forces were temporarily reprieved due to the preoccupation of the latter with the Abbasids, who had launched raids into the rebel powerbase of the Anatolikon. However, rather than maintain a defensive response Thomas launched a counter-invasion into Abbasid Armenia. The province was especially vulnerable at the time, as the Abbasid governor and his army had sustained a heavy defeat by the Babak Khorramdin Khurramite rebels in the South Caucasus only months earlier. Thomas consequently invaded Armenia, defeated the depleted Abbasid armies that opposed him and completed his victory with a successful siege of Theodosiopolis.

Preoccupied with the threat of the Khurramite rebels, Caliph Al-Ma'mun sought to avoid further direct conflict with the Byzantines. Instead, his approach was exploit the Byzantines' own political turmoil, in order to neutralize the potential threat posed by them. For his part, Thomas also intended to refocus his military efforts toward the struggle against Michael, and consequently dispatched an embassy to Baghdad. The consequence was an alliance between the usurper and the Abbasids. Strategically, it was vital for Thomas to reach a settlement with the caliphate, as he would need to strip his Anatolian holdings of soldiers in order to initiate a decisive campaign into Europe and seize Constantinople. Thomas may have even sought to enlist Abbasid military support from the beginning of his revolt, though the raids by the latter had necessitated the military operations he conducted in Armenia. (Note: A letter dispatched by Michael II to the court of Carolingian King Louis claimed that, during the reign of Irene of Athens, Thomas held an adulterous affair with the wife of a patrician, and when knowledge of this reached the public, he fled to the Abbasid Caliphate to escape punishment, remaining there until the reign of Leo V. He was also thought to have renounced Christianity and identified himself as the Byzantine claimant Constantine, Irene's son. This raises the possibility that Thomas had taken refuge in the Abbasid Caliphate before his later revolt and had there developed connections.) Thomas was said to have agreed to pay a small tribute to Baghdad, and in exchange al-Mam'un recognized his claim to the Byzantine throne and offered indirect support to his cause, allowing Thomas a state-sanctioned journey to Antioch, where he was crowned as emperor by the patriarch there. Thomas was also permitted to recruit volunteers, mainly Christians from the Abbasid territories along the Al-Thughur frontier, to bolster his forces. Consequently, he was unlike before able to renew his campaigns against Michael from a position of greater strength.

== Assault on Constantinople ==
- Crossing and siege of Constantinople

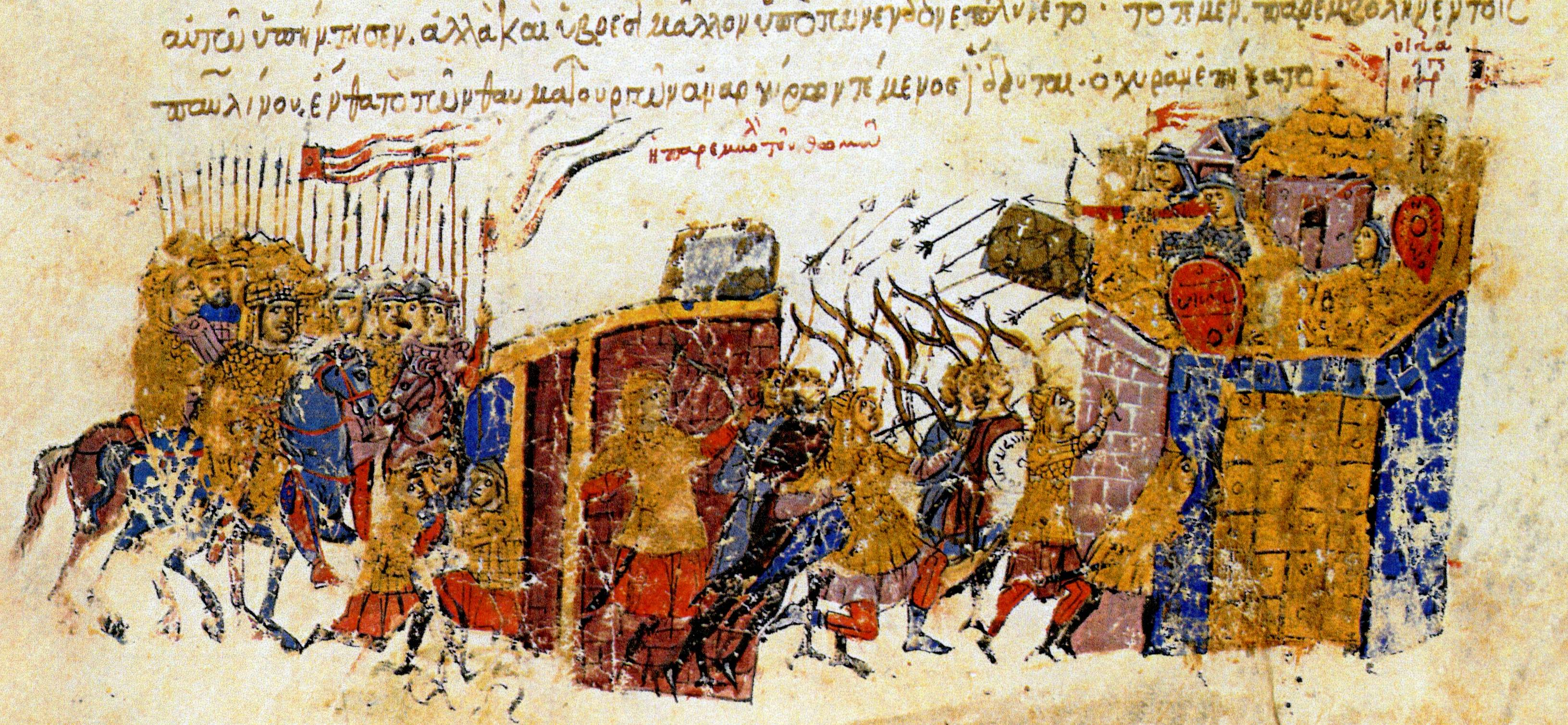
Assault on Constantinople by the rebel forces

After consolidating his position in the east, Thomas assembled his troops and built his own fleet from the Cibyrrhaeot and Aegean Sea Themes to counter the imperial fleet stationed in the capital. Around this time, Thomas also adopted a young man named Constantius, to serve as his co-emperor and thereby entrench his political position with the establishment. Thomas then recalled the nephew of Leo, Gregory Pterotos, who had been exiled by Michael to the island of Skyros, and bestowed upon him command of the rebel naval forces. Thomas himself set off with his Thracesian army towards Abydos, having previously dispatched Constantius with an army ahead to complete the capitulation of the Armeniakon Theme. However, Constantius was ambushed and killed by the imperial loyalist troops under Olbianos, who followed his victory by dispatching a messenger bearing Constantius' severed head to Thomas' encampment at Abydos, a stratagem meant to demoralize the rebel faction.

Following this setback, Thomas replaced Constantius by adopting a former monk named Anastasius, granted him the title of co-emperor, and ordered the military preparations to continue without delay. Thomas ferried his massive army across the Hellespont and in the late October or early November of 821 and made landfall in Thrace, where the local inhabitants and garrison soldiers begun defecting to his army. Michael had recently marched into Thrace ahead of time with a small loyalist contingent to reinforce the regional fortresses and secure the people's loyalty, but after the locals deserted to Thomas en masse, Michael realized he was outnumbered and withdrew his remaining troops to safety behind the walls of Constantinople. Thomas arrived outside the city capital with roughly 80,000 men and set up his primary military camp at the Monastery of Saints Cosmas and Damian, located in the suburb of Blachernae (outside the northern land walls of Constantinople), as he assumed the city to quickly surrender, but the inhabitants refused and the city was besieged. Thomas first led his main force against the Theodosian Walls using siege engines, ordering a massive artillery barrage using catapults and mechanical siege towers. However, a brutal winter storm with freezing rain and severe wind gusts paralyzed the wooden machinery, snapping the ropes of his catapults and making ladders too slick to climb. In the spring, Thomas launched a massive coordinated naval attack under Gregory Pterotos against seaward walls along the Golden Horn. Michael II deployed his imperial dromon warships, unleashing Greek fire against the rebel fleet, incinerating the rebel ships, breaking Thomas' naval blockade, while killing many of Gregory Pterotos' sailors.

=== Bulgarian intervention and Battle of Kedouktos ===
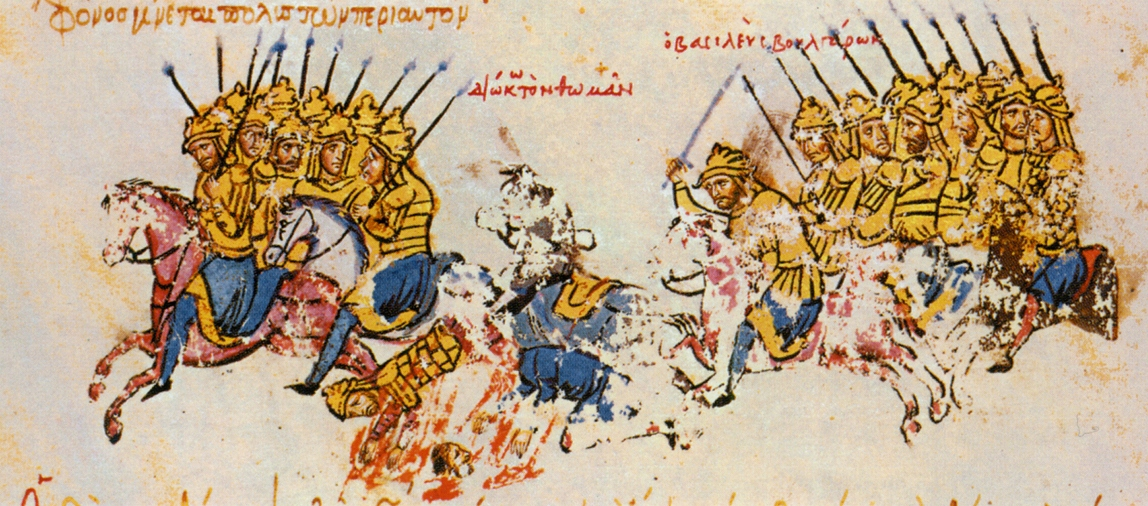
The Bulgars under Omurtag attack Thomas' army at Kedouktos

According to the historians Genesios and Theophanes Continuatus, while Thomas besieged Constantinople, Kanasubigi Omurtag had dispatched an embassy offering to intervene on behalf of Michael II against the usurper, which the emperor supposedly refused on the grounds that employing pagans to slay Christians was unthinkable. However, Omurtag invaded Thrace of his own accord, likely in November 822, (Note: John Bagnell Bury dates the Bulgarian attack to spring 823) and advanced towards Constantinople, which in turn prompted Thomas to detach his soldiers from the siege and march against the Bulgars. The two sides met at Kedouktos, near Heraclea, and according to Genesios the Bulgarians defeated Thomas, with Omurtag returning to Bulgaria with significant quantities of plunder. However, the account of the near-contemporary George Hamartolos claims the Bulgarian incursion had been brought about by the diplomatic machinations of Michael, who dispatched pleas to Omurtag for aid against Thomas, which forced Thomas to lift the siege in order to confront the Bulgars. According to George, Thomas defeated the Bulgars in battle, killing large numbers of their warriors, and forcing them out of Thrace. However, the victory may have been pyrrhic, with heavy losses on Thomas' own side, as the usurper was unable to resume the siege of Constantinople, and instead retired his army to his operating base at Arcadiopolis for the winter. Due to the propagandistic narrative of Genesios' account, most modern scholars consider George's account to be more reliable.

== End of the rebellion ==
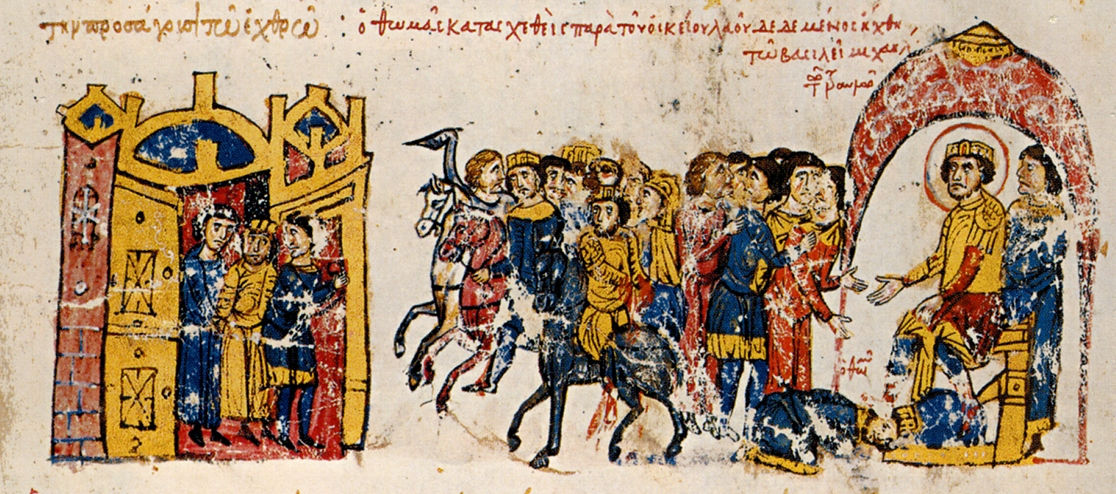
Surrender and humiliation of Thomas

Although the confrontation with the Bulgarians had likely ended in victory for Thomas, it brought little strategic benefit for the rebel cause. The Bulgarian intervention had forced him to raise his siege of Constantinople, and the failure of this endeavour deteriorated the morale of the rebel army. Over the winter, contingents of the rebel forces began to desert or defect to Michael's side, and this in turn handed the strategic initiative to the loyalists. Michael II personally took the field, around spring 823, and confronted the exhausted rebel army under Thomas. The rebel force broke and fled, while some surrendered to Michael. After which, Michael had the remaining rebels besieged inside the fortified Arcadiopolis. After a grueling, starving months-long blockade, Thomas' own troops surrendered him to the emperor in exchange for a pardon. Thomas was brought before the emperor outside of the city, fell to the ground and begged for mercy, prostrating himself and weeping at his rival's feet where he is claimed to have pleaded:

Have mercy on me, oh True Emperor

According to some accounts, Michael hesitated and showed a brief moment of pity, until the emperor's chief adviser, John Hexaboulios, urged him to be ruthless, warning that sparing a charismatic rebel would only invite future civil wars. Thomas was then dismembered and impaled on a stake alongside his adopted son, Anastasius, thus ending the three-year long rebellion.

== Aftermath ==
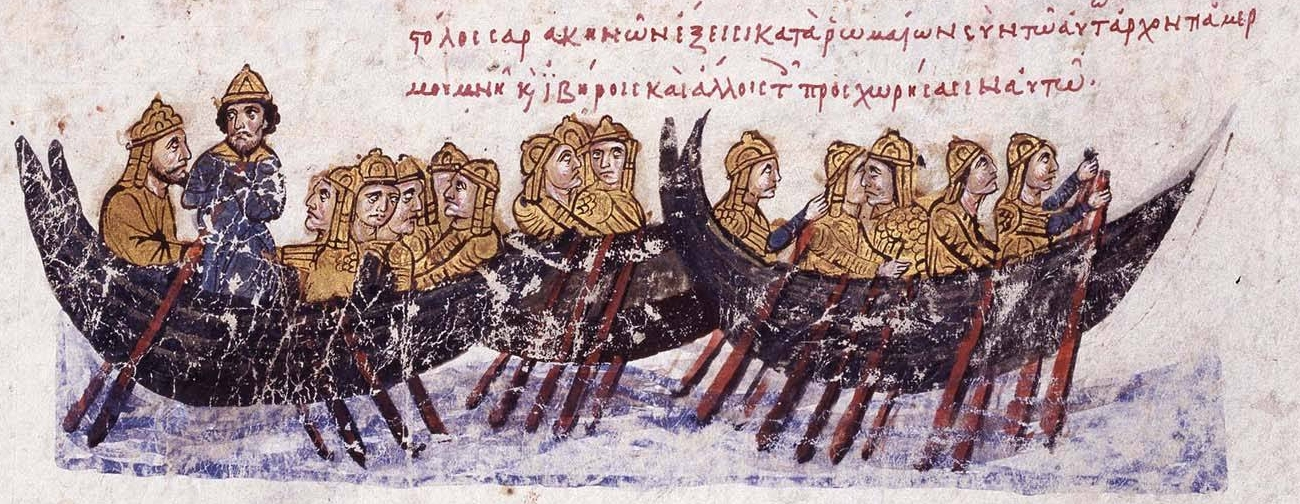
Saracens sail against Crete

After the devastating civil war ended in 823, the Byzantine army and navy had been left weakened, and the treasury had been exhausted, leaving the empire vulnerable to foreign invasion. The following year Andalusian exiles successfully captured the island of Crete, establishing the Emirate of Crete. In Anatolia, al-Ma'mun also begun conducting annual summer raids (ṣā'ifa) in 825, but his forces were defeated at the battle of Ancyra. Two years later, the Aghlabids in the west began their conquest of Sicily, following the rebellion of Euphemius.

== Bibliography ==
- Treadgold, Warren (1988). The Byzantine Revival, 780–842.
- Sophoulis, Panos (2011). Byzantium and Bulgaria, 775–831. Winner of the 2013 John Bell Book Prize. Oxford University Press. ISBN 978 90 04 20695 3.
- Bury, John Bagnell (1912). A History of the Eastern Roman Empire from the Fall of Irene to the Accession of Basil I (A.D. 802–867). London: Macmillan and Company. OCLC 458995052.
- Kaldellis, Anthony (2023). The New Roman Empire: A History of Byzantium. Oxford University Press. ISBN 978-0197549322.
- Codoñer, Juan Signes (2016). The Emperor Theophilos and the East, 829–842 Court and Frontier in Byzantium During the Last Phase of Iconoclasm. Taylor and Francis. pp. 20–21. ISBN 9781317034278.
- Brubaker, L.; Haldon, J. (2001). Byzantium in the Iconoclast Era, c. 680-850: the sources: an annotated survey. Birmingham Byzantine and Ottoman Studies. Vol. 7. Aldershot: Ashgate. ISBN 978-0-754-60418-1.
- Brubaker, L.; Haldon, J. (2011). Byzantium in the Iconoclast Era, c. 680-850: A History. Cambridge University Press. ISBN 978-0-521-43093-7.
- Wortley, John, ed. (2010). John Skylitzes: A Synopsis of Byzantine History, 811–1057. Cambridge: Cambridge University Press. ISBN 978-0-521-76705-7.
- Lilie, Ralph-Johannes; Ludwig, Claudia; Pratsch, Thomas; Zielke, Beate (2001). "Thomas "der Slawe" (#8459)". Prosopographie der mittelbyzantinischen Zeit: 1. Abteilung (641–867), Band 5 : Theophylaktos (# 8346) – az-Zubair (# 8675), Anonymi (# 10001–12149) (in German). Berlin and Boston: De Gruyter. pp. 33–38. ISBN 978-3-11-016675-0.
- Vasiliev, Alexander A. (1935). Byzance et les Arabes, Tome I: La dynastie d'Amorium (820–867). Corpus Bruxellense Historiae Byzantinae (in French). Vol. 1. French ed.: Henri Grégoire, Marius Canard. Brussels: Éditions de l'Institut de philologie et d'histoire orientales.
