= Battle of Ancyra (825) =

- Part of the Arab–Byzantine wars
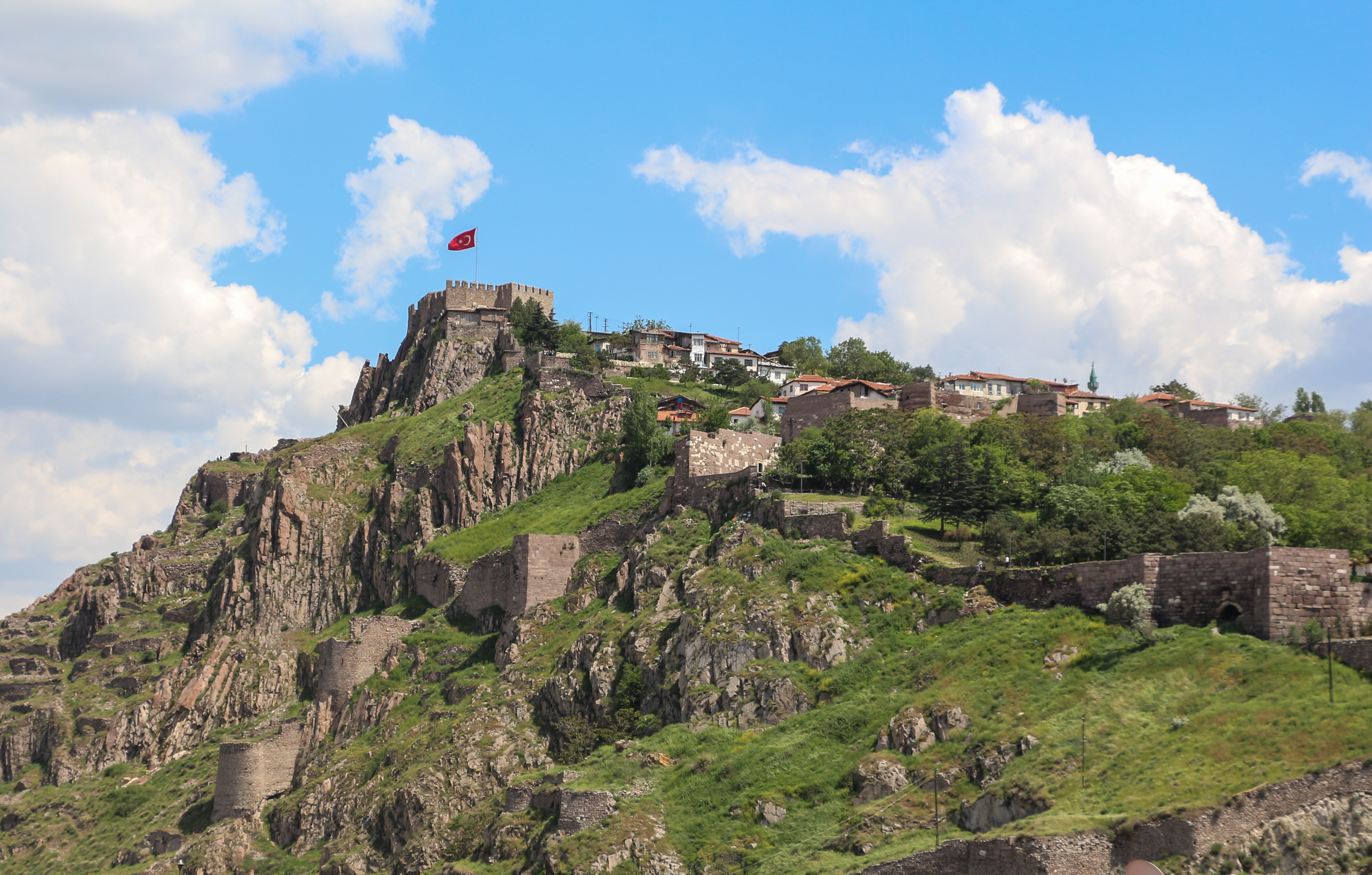
- Historical site of Ankara Castle, which was fortified extensively during the Byzantine Dark Ages
Date	Summer 825
Location	Ancyra & Corum, Asia Minor (modern Turkey)
Result	Byzantine victory

Belligerents
Byzantine Empire	Abbasid Caliphate

Commanders and leaders
Michael II	Yaqzan bin 'Abd al-Ala bin Usayd al-Salami †

Strength
Unknown	Large army

Casualties and losses
Unknown	Devastating

The Battle of Ancyra or Battles of Ancyra and Corum were part of a campaign fought between the Byzantine Empire and an Abbasid invasion force in the summer of 825. In retaliation for a Byzantine offensive the previous year, an Abbasid army entered Asia Minor and pillaged as far as Galatia. However, the Arabs were confronted by a Byzantine army, possibly commanded by Emperor Michael II in person, and were dealt a defeat in which an Abbasid general was killed.

== Background ==
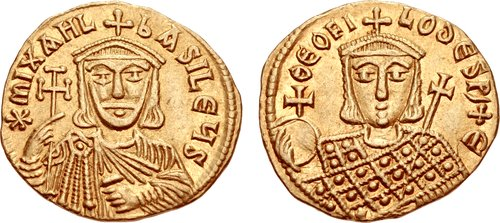
Golden solidus depicting the busts of Emperor Michael II and Co-Emperor Theophilos

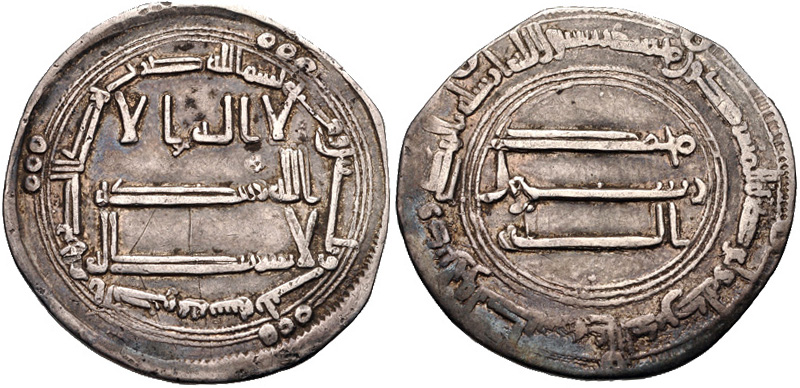
Dirhem of Abbasid Caliph al-Ma'mun

Following his final victory in the devastating civil war against Thomas the Slav, Emperor Michael II had steadily began to consolidate his position and boost his prestige. To accomplish the latter, Michael planned to lead an expedition against the main external opponent of the Byzantine Empire, the Abbasid Caliphate. Such a campaign was justified as a response to the significant amounts of aid provided by Caliph Al-Ma'mun to Thomas during his revolt. The ongoing preoccupation of the Abbasids with the uprising of Babak Khorramdin provided a strategic opportunity, while the Caliphate's frontier defences were disarrayed. Consequently, Michael prepared an army and by Summer 824 dispatched it to invade northern Syria and the vicinity of Melitene. The Byzantines targeted the strategic border stronghold of Sozopetra, which they captured in a siege and destroyed. The Byzantines also raided the region widely, capturing large quantities of loot and seizing local livestock. Simultaneously, Michael had dispatched a fleet from the Byzantine navy to conduct a raiding expedition, which devastated the coastal possessions of Abbasid Syria.

In the short term the Abbasids did not respond to the Byzantine incursion, though Al-Ma'mun authorised the restoration of Sozopetra. However, the Byzantine successes at this time were also coupled with a setback when the Island of Crete, with its garrison weakened during the civil war against Thomas, was captured by Andalusian exiles. An expedition sent to retake Crete, between 824 and early 826, ended in failure for Michael's forces. The Abbasid Caliphate also prepared a military response for the year 825 via the resumption of their ṣāwa'if invasions. Thus, the Byzantine position was still precarious as they suffered threats on multiple fronts.

== Invasion and battles ==
In spring 825, Michael dispatched an envoy to Al-Ma'mun in Baghdad, seeking a peace settlement. However, the Abbasid military had by this time pacified the Khurramite rebels operating in northern Syria, which allowed them to direct refocus their military efforts against Byzantium. Consequently, Al-Ma'mun rejected Michael's overtures and redoubled efforts to assemble a large army in along the Al-Thughur to invade Asia Minor. The commander of this army was Yaqzan bin 'Abd al-Ala bin Usayd al-Salami, who attacked Anatolia in the summer. The Abbasid strategy adopted the form of a two-pronged attack against Anatolia by land and sea, with Yaqzan's army entering either the Armeniakon Theme, the Cappadocian Theme or both, presumably from the right invasion route launched from Melitene. Simultaneously, an Abbasid fleet under an unknown admiral sailed along the Mediterranean coastline with Attaleia as its ultimate destination. Yaqzan's army enjoyed initial success, killing large numbers of Byzantine citizens and devastating the lands of Asia Minor as far as Phrygia in the Opsikion Theme. These depredations demanded a strategic response by Michael, who promptly dispatched thematic and tagmatic forces from Constantinople to confront the invaders. (Note: Greenwood reasons that Michael II led this army in person)

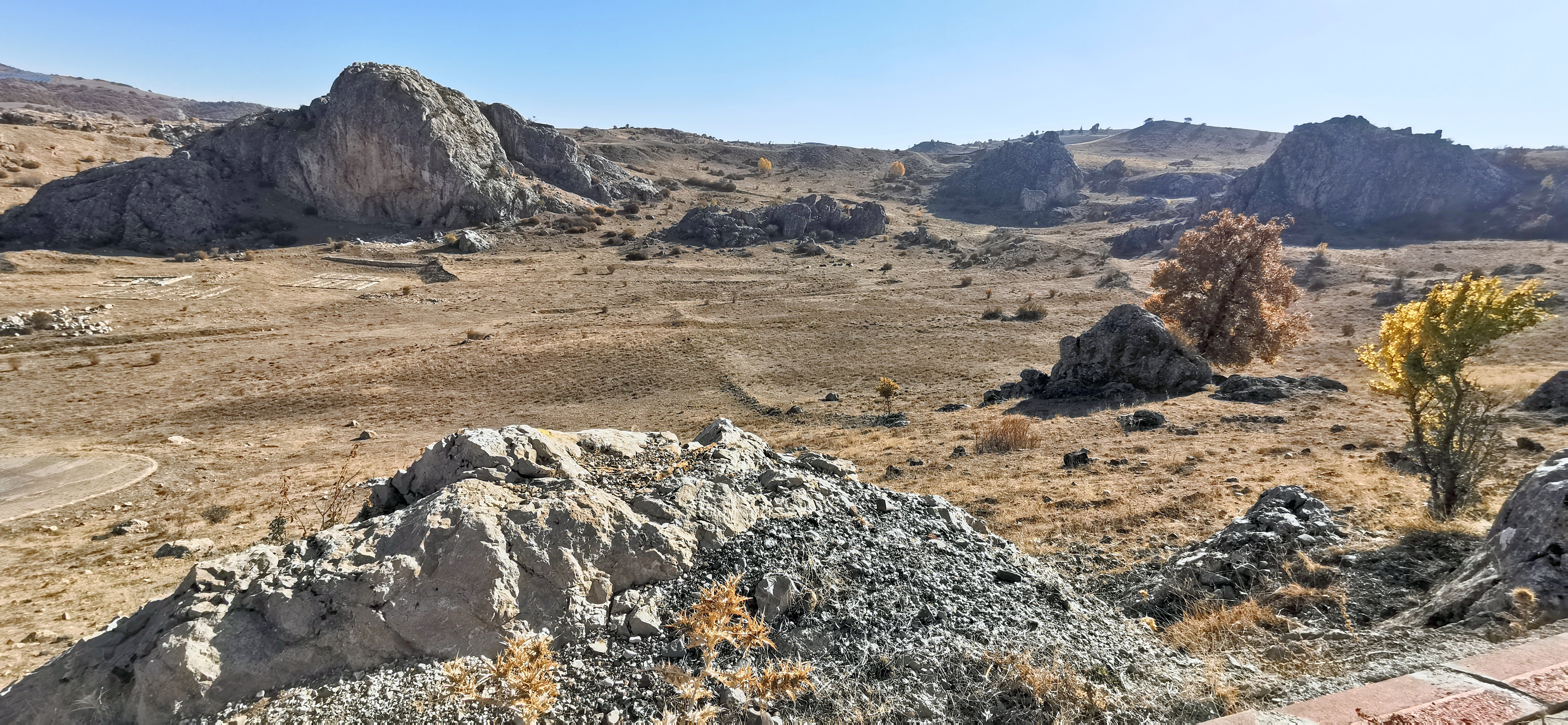
Modern view of the ancient Sarikale (Yellow Fortress) rock in Corum province

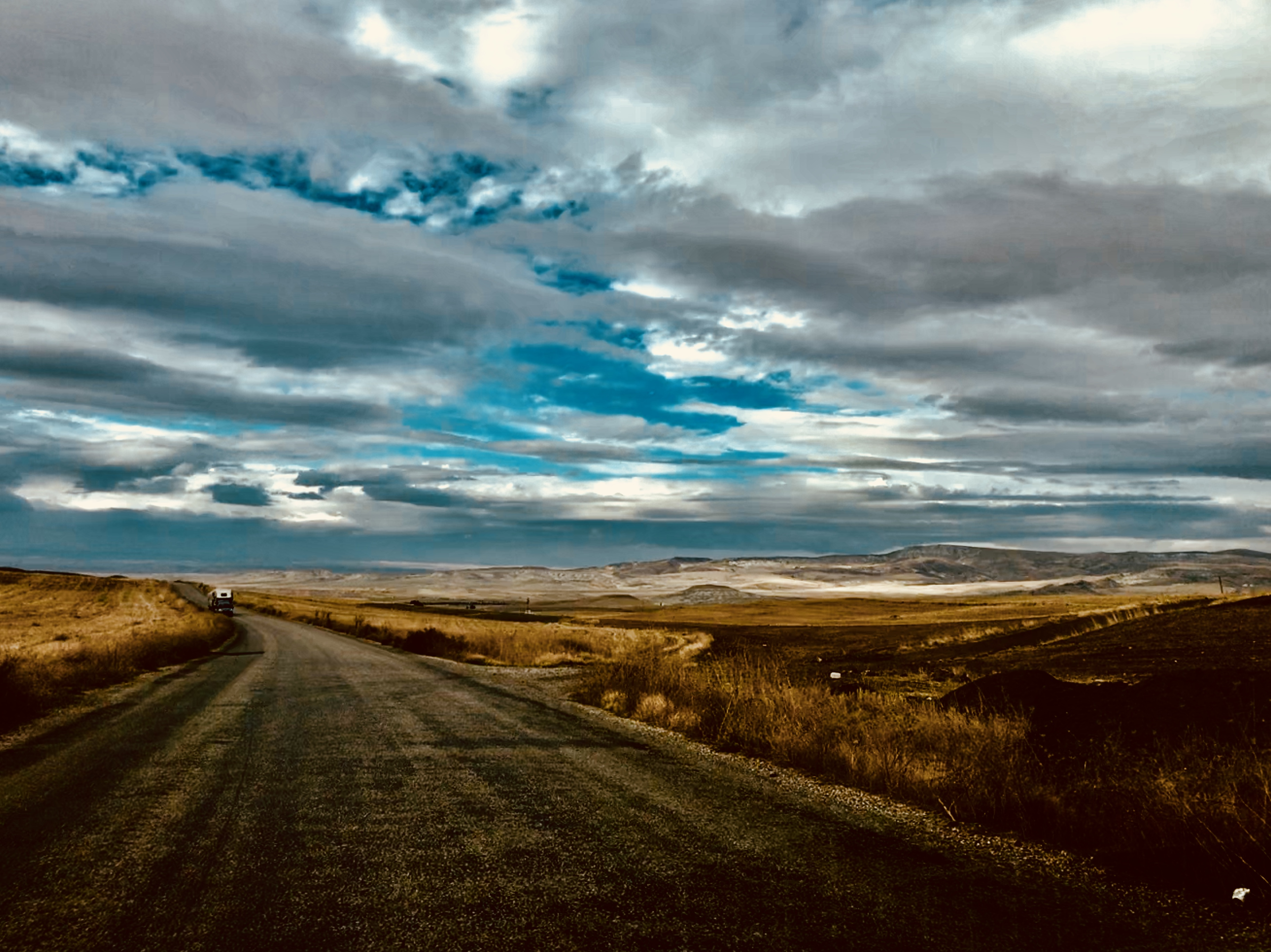
Modern view of the open terrain near Haymana in the Ankara province

The Byzantine forces promptly arrived in Galatia, where they were able to intercept the Abbasid armies. The Armenian historian Stepanos Taronetsi narrated an encounter ending in the slaughter of an Abbasid army near the awan of Kur˙n and that the Arabs were ultimately defeated near Ankiwr˙ian. Tim Greenwood proposes that both locations are to be identified with Ancyra, the headquarters of the Opsikion theme, though Warren Treadgold locates only Ankiwr˙ian at Ancyra and identifies Kur'n with Corum. In any case, the Byzantines heavily defeated the Abbasid expedition in Phrygia, with a multitude of Arab warriors being slain in the fighting along with general Yaqzan himself. It is possible that the Abbasids had divided their army into raiding columns, so that the Byzantines defeated these in detail over two battles fought at Ancyra and Corum.

== Aftermath ==
Although the Byzantines had defeated the Abbasids in Phrygia, the victory was partially counteracted by the exploits of the Abbasid naval raid. The Arabs reached their target of Attaleia, headquarters of the Cibyrrhaeot Theme, and blockaded the city. Due to recent losses of assets in the civil war against Thomas, Cibyrrhaeot naval forces were too weak to attempt to relieve Attaleia at this time. Ultimately, the strategos of the Cibyrrhaeots, John Echimus, was forced to negotiate with the Abbasids and paid them a ransom to break off their blockade. (Note: It may have been this success that allowed al-Baladhuri to describe the invasions in Summer 825 as an Abbasid victory. Baldhuri omits mention of the Abbasid defeats in Phrygia during this Campaign, but does record the death of general Yaqzan) The operation demonstrated further the relative weakness of Byzantine naval defences during the latter half of Michael II's reign, which emboldened the newly established Cretan saracens to conduct numerous raids of their own along the Aegean and Eastern Mediterranean coasts in the coming years.

== Bibliography ==
- Treadgold, Warren (1988). The Byzantine Revival, 780–842.
- Treadgold, Warren (1997). A History of the Byzantine State and Society. Stanford, California: Stanford University Press. ISBN 978-0804779371.
- Sophoulis, Panos (2011). Byzantium and Bulgaria, 775–831. Winner of the 2013 John Bell Book Prize. Oxford University Press. ISBN 978 90 04 20695 3.
- Pryor, John H.; Jeffreys, Elizabeth M. (2006). The Age of the ΔΡΟΜΩΝ: The Byzantine Navy ca. 500–1204. Leiden and Boston: Brill Academic Publishers. ISBN 978-90-04-15197-0.
- Georgios, Theotokis; Tsurtsumia, Mamuka (2025). Nikephoros II Phokas and Warfare in the 10th-Century Byzantine World. Brill. ISBN 978-9004512306.
- Greenwood, Tim (2017). The Universal History of Step anos Tarõnec'i: Introduction, Translation, and Commentary. Oxford University Press. ISBN 978 0 19 879251 2.
