= Gregory Pterotos =

Gregory Pterotos (Greek: Γρηγόριος Πτερωτός) was a Byzantine general and relative of Emperor Leo V the Armenian (r. 813–820), who took part in the rebellion of Thomas the Slav against Leo's murderer, Michael II the Amorian (r. 820–829).

== Biography ==
A relative (possibly a nephew) of Leo V the Armenian, Gregory had served as a strategos (general and military governor of a theme) under Leo, but neither of the main sources (Genesios, Theophanes Continuatus, Skylitzes) mention any details. The historian Gustave Schlumberger identified him with a strategos of Macedonia known through a contemporary seal, while Warren Treadgold theorized that Gregory may have served as Count of the Opsician Theme, which was the Asian theme closest to Constantinople and hence of particular importance for the stability of the regime.

On Christmas Day 820, Leo was murdered by the supporters of his long-time friend, Michael the Amorian, who succeeded him on the throne. When presented to the new emperor to swear his allegiance, a few days later, Gregory was overcome with emotion and began abusing Michael for his supporters' acts, implying his own involvement. Michael initially appeared conciliatory, and even said that he understood Gregory's feelings, but two days later, he had him arrested and exiled to the island of Skyros in the central Aegean Sea. He was soon released by the supporters of Thomas the Slav, who had risen up in revolt against Michael and rallied most of the themes of Asia Minor to his side. Gregory readily joined Thomas's revolt, and was entrusted with the command of over 10,000 troops.

Gregory commanded Thomas's fleet in the assaults on Constantinople, attempting without success to scale the seaward walls of the city along the Golden Horn: in the first assault, in December 821, the fleet was hindered by the weather from playing any part in the attack, but in the second assault in spring 822, his fleet was decisively defeated by the imperial fleet loyal to Michael. This setback demoralized Thomas's supporters, and was especially damaging for Gregory as the main naval commander. In addition, Michael held his wife and children hostage in Constantinople, so that Gregory took up contact with the emperor and resolved to desert Thomas along with a small group of loyal followers. He departed the rebel camp and headed west, sending a monk to inform Michael of his defection, but the monk failed to circumvent the blockade and reach the capital. Upon learning of this defection, Thomas reacted quickly: with a select detachment, he followed Gregory, defeated his troops, and killed him.

== Sources ==
- Lilie, Ralph-Johannes; Ludwig, Claudia; Pratsch, Thomas; Zielke, Beate (2000). "Gregorios Pterotos (#2477)". Prosopographie der mittelbyzantinischen Zeit: 1. Abteilung (641–867), Band 2: Georgios (# 2183) – Leon (# 4270) (in German). Berlin and Boston: De Gruyter. pp. 86–87. ISBN 978-3-11-016672-9.
- Treadgold, Warren (1988). The Byzantine Revival, 780–842. Stanford, California: Stanford University Press. ISBN 978-0-8047-1462-4.
