= Thomas the Slav =

Byzantine military commander (c. 760–823)

- Emperor of the Romans
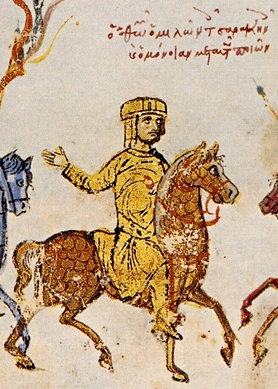
- Miniature from the Madrid Skylitzes version of the chronicle of John Skylitzes depicting Thomas, on horseback and dressed as a Byzantine emperor, negotiating with the Arabs. The rebellion of Thomas is one of the most richly illustrated episodes in the chronicle.

Usurper of the Byzantine empire
- Reign: c. December 820 – c. May 823
- Coronation: Spring 821 by Job of Antioch
- Rival: Michael II
- Born: c. 760; Gaziura (modern-day Turhal, Tokat, Turkey)
- Died: 823; Arcadiopolis (modern-day Lüleburgaz, Kırklareli, Turkey)
- Issue: Constantius (adopted)

Military service
- Allegiance: Byzantine Empire
- Years of service: c. 803 – 820
- Rank: tourmarches

Thomas the Slav (Greek: Θωμᾶς, romanized: Thōmas, c. 760 – October 823) was a 9th-century Byzantine military commander, most notable for leading a wide-scale revolt in 821–823 against Emperor Michael II the Amorian (r. 820–829).

An army officer of Slavic origin from the Pontus region (now north-eastern Turkey), Thomas rose to prominence, along with the future emperors Michael II and Leo V the Armenian (r. 813–820), under the protection of general Bardanes Tourkos. After Bardanes' failed rebellion in 803, Thomas fell into obscurity until Leo V's rise to the throne, when Thomas was raised to a senior military command in central Asia Minor. After the murder of Leo and usurpation of the throne by Michael the Amorian, Thomas revolted, claiming the throne for himself. Thomas quickly secured support from most of the themes (provinces) and troops in Asia Minor, defeated Michael's initial counter-attack and concluded an alliance with the Abbasid Caliphate. After winning over the maritime themes and their ships as well, he crossed with his army to Europe and laid siege to Constantinople. The imperial capital withstood Thomas's attacks by land and sea, while Michael II called for help from the Bulgarian Khan Omurtag. Omurtag attacked Thomas's army, but although repelled, the Bulgarians inflicted heavy casualties on Thomas's men, who broke and fled when Michael took to the field a few months later. Thomas and his supporters sought refuge in Arcadiopolis, where he was soon blockaded by Michael's troops. In the end, Thomas's supporters surrendered him in exchange for a pardon, and he was executed.

Thomas's rebellion was one of the largest in the Byzantine Empire's history, but its precise circumstances are unclear due to competing historical narratives, which have come to include claims fabricated by Michael to blacken his opponent's name. Consequently, various motives and driving forces have been attributed to Thomas and his followers. As summarized by the Oxford Dictionary of Byzantium, "Thomas's revolt has been variously attributed to a reaction against Iconoclasm, a social revolution and popular uprising, a revolt by the Empire's non-Greek ethnic groups, Thomas's personal ambitions, and his desire to avenge Leo V." Its effects on the military position of the Empire, particularly vis-à-vis the Arabs, are also disputed.

== Early life and career ==
The 11th-century historical account Theophanes Continuatus states that Thomas was descended from South Slavs resettled in Asia Minor by successive Byzantine emperors, while the 10th-century chronicler Genesios calls him "Thomas from Lake Gouzourou, of Armenian race". Most modern scholars support his Slavic descent and believe his birthplace to have been near Gaziura in the Pontus. Hence his epithet of "the Slav", which has been applied to him in modern times, and not in medieval sources. Nothing is known about his family and early life, except that his parents were poor and that Thomas himself had received no education. Given that he was between 50 and 60 years old at the time of the rebellion, he was probably born around 760.

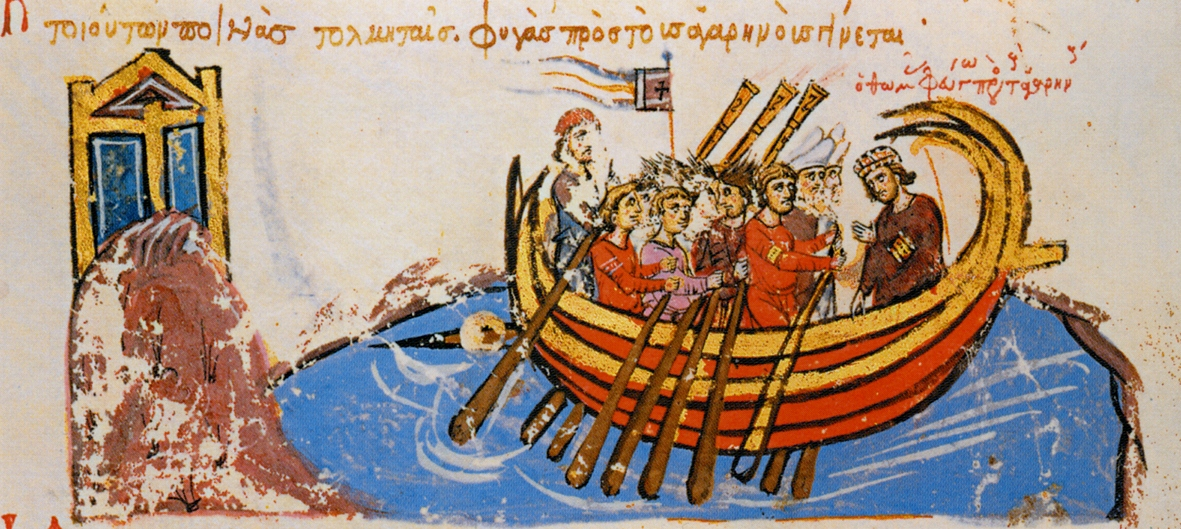
Miniature from the Madrid Skylitzes depicting Thomas's supposed flight to the Arabs

Two different accounts of Thomas's life are recounted in both Genesios and Theophanes Continuatus. According to the first account, Thomas first appeared in 803 accompanying general Bardanes Tourkos, and pursued a military career until launching his revolt in late 820. In the second version, he came to Constantinople as a poor youth and entered the service of a man with the high court rank of patrikios. Then, discovered trying to commit adultery with his master's wife, Thomas fled to the Abbasid Caliphate in Syria, where he remained for 25 years. Pretending to be the murdered emperor Constantine VI (r. 780–797), he then led an Arab-sponsored invasion of Asia Minor, but was defeated and punished. Classical and Byzantine scholar J.B. Bury tried to reconcile the two narratives, placing Thomas's flight to the Caliphate at around 788 and then having him return to Byzantine service before 803, while the Russian scholar Alexander Vasiliev interpreted the sources as implying that Thomas fled to the Caliphate at Constantine VI's deposition in 797, and that his participation in Bardanes's revolt must be discounted entirely. The second version of Thomas's story is explicitly preferred by Genesios and Theophanes Continuatus, and is the only one recorded in 9th-century sources, namely the chronicle of George the Monk and the Life of Saints David, Symeon, and George of Lesbos. Nevertheless, the French Byzantinist Paul Lemerle came to consider it an unreliable later tradition created by his rival Michael II to discredit Thomas, and rejected it altogether, preferring to rely on the first account alone. Most modern scholars follow him in this interpretation.

The first tradition relates that Thomas served as a spatharios (staff officer) to Bardanes Tourkos, the monostratēgos (lit. 'single-general', i.e. commander-in-chief) of the eastern themes, who in 803 rose in rebellion against Emperor Nikephoros I (r. 802–811). Alongside Thomas were two other young spatharioi in Bardanes's retinue, who formed a fraternal association: Leo the Armenian (the future Leo V) and Michael the Amorian (the future Michael II). According to a later hagiographical tradition, before launching his revolt, Bardanes, in the company of his three young protégés, is said to have visited a monk near Philomelion who was reputed to foresee the future. The monk predicted what would indeed happen: that Bardanes's revolt would fail, that Leo and Michael would both become emperors, and that Thomas would be acclaimed emperor and killed. When Bardanes did in fact rise up, he failed to win any widespread support. Leo and Michael soon abandoned him and defected to the imperial camp and were rewarded with senior military posts. Thomas alone remained loyal to Bardanes until his surrender. In the aftermath of Bardanes's failure, Thomas disappears from the sources for ten years. Bury suggests that he fled (for a second time according to his interpretation) to the Arabs, a view accepted by a number of other scholars, such as Romilly James Heald Jenkins. The historian Warren Treadgold, however, argues that Thomas stayed in the empire and that may have even remained in active military service, and explains his obscurity by Thomas's association with Bardanes, which hampered his career.

In July 813, Leo the Armenian became emperor and quickly rewarded his old companions, giving them command over elite military forces. Michael received the tagma of the Excubitors (one of the professional guard cavalry regiments stationed around Constantinople), and Thomas the tourma (military division) of the Foederati, stationed in the Anatolic Theme.

== Rebellion ==
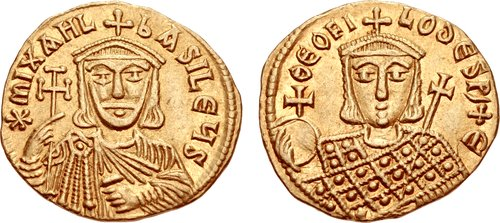
Gold solidus of Michael II with his son, Theophilos

=== Background and motives ===
On Christmas Day 820, Leo was murdered in the palace chapel by officials under the direction of Michael the Amorian, who was quickly crowned emperor. At about the same time, Thomas launched a rebellion in the Anatolic Theme. Sources are divided on the exact chronology and motives of the revolt. George the Monk, the hagiographic sources, and a letter from Michael II to the western emperor Louis the Pious claim that Thomas had risen up against Leo before Michael's usurpation. This chronology is followed by almost all later Byzantine chroniclers like Genesios, Theophanes Continuatus, and Skylitzes, as well as a number of modern scholars like J. B. Bury and Alexander Kazhdan. In his study of Thomas and the revolt, Paul Lemerle dismisses this timeline as a later attempt by Michael to justify his revolt as a response to Leo's failure to suppress the rebellion, and to exculpate himself of the early defeats suffered by the imperial forces. Some recent studies follow Lemerle and prefer the account of Symeon Logothetes—generally considered the most accurate of the 10th-century sources—according to which Thomas rebelled a few days after the murder of Leo and in reaction to it.

Two rivals fought for a crown, which one of them had seized, but could not yet be said to have firmly grasped. Michael had been regularly elected, acclaimed, and crowned in the capital, and he had the advantage of possessing the Imperial city. [Thomas] had the support of most of the Asiatic provinces; he was only a rebel because he failed.

— J. B. Bury

Consequently, the empire became divided in a struggle that was less a rebellion against the established government and more a contest for the throne between equal contenders. Michael held Constantinople and the European provinces, controlled the imperial bureaucracy, and had been properly crowned by the Patriarch of Constantinople, but he had come to the throne through murder, while Thomas gained support and legitimacy through his claim to avenge the fallen Leo, and he won the backing of themes both in Asia and later in Europe. Thomas was a well-known, popular, and respected figure in Asia Minor, where Leo V had enjoyed considerable support. Michael, on the other hand, was virtually unknown outside the capital; his military record was unremarkable, he was uneducated and coarse of manner, his stutter earned him ridicule, and he was reputed to sympathize with the heretical religious sect of the Athinganoi, to which his family had belonged.

Byzantine accounts of Thomas's rebellion state that he did not in fact claim the throne under his own name but assumed the identity of Emperor Constantine VI, who had been deposed and murdered by his mother, Irene of Athens, in 797. Most modern scholars follow Lemerle, who dismisses this as yet another later fabrication. If it contains any truth, it is possible that this story may originate from Thomas choosing to be crowned under the regnal name of "Constantine", but there is no evidence for such an act. The possible appropriation of Constantine VI's identity is linked in some Byzantine sources with the statement that Thomas was a rumoured supporter of iconolatry, as opposed to Michael's support for iconoclasm: it was under Constantine VI that veneration of the icons was restored. Nevertheless, the ambiguous phrasing of the sources, the iconoclast leanings of many themes in Asia Minor, and Thomas's alliance with the Arabs seem to speak against any open commitment to icon veneration on his part. Indeed, given Michael II's conciliatory approach during his early reign, the icon veneration controversy does not seem to have been a major issue at the time, and in the view of modern scholars most probably did not play a major role in Thomas's revolt. The image of Thomas as an iconophile champion opposed to the iconoclast Michael II in later, Macedonian-era sources was probably the result of their own anti-iconoclast bias. Warren Treadgold furthermore suggests that if true, Thomas's claim to be Constantine VI may have been little more than a tale circulated to win support, and that Thomas pursued a "studied ambiguity" towards icons, designed to attract support from iconophiles. In Treadgold's words, "Thomas could be all things to all men until he had conquered the whole empire, and then he would have time enough to disappoint some of his followers".

The account of Theophanes Continuatus on Thomas's revolt states that in this time, "the servant raised his hand against his master, the soldier against his officer, the captain against his general". This has led some scholars, chiefly Alexander Vasiliev and George Ostrogorsky, to regard Thomas's revolt as an expression of widespread discontent among the rural population, which suffered under heavy taxation. Other Byzantinists, notably Lemerle, dismiss rural discontent as a primary factor during the revolt.

Genesios and other chroniclers further state that Thomas won the support of "Hagarenes, Indians (Zutt), Egyptians, Assyrians, Medians, Abasgians, Zichs, Iberians, Kabirs, Slavs, Huns, Vandals, Getae, the sectarians of Manes, Laz, Alanians, Chaldians, Armenians and every kind of other peoples". This has led to modern claims that Thomas's rebellion represented an uprising of the empire's non-Greek ethnic groups, but according to Lemerle, this exaggerated account is yet another piece of hostile disinformation. It is almost certain, however, that Thomas could count on support among the empire's Caucasian neighbours, for the presence of Abasgians, Armenians, and Iberians in his army is mentioned in the near-contemporary letter of Michael II to Louis the Pious. The reasons for this support are unclear; Thomas may have made unspecified promises to their rulers, but Lemerle suggests that the Armenians might have in part been motivated by revenge for Leo, their murdered kinsman.

=== Outbreak and spread of the revolt in Asia Minor ===
Map of the themes of Asia Minor (modern Anatolia) and of Thrace c. 842

As commander of the Foederati, Thomas was based at Amorion, the capital of the Anatolic Theme. Although junior to the theme's stratēgos (military governor), his proclamation received widespread support throughout Asia Minor. Within a short time, all the Asian themes supported Thomas, except for the Opsikion Theme under the patrician Katakylas, a nephew of Michael II, and the Armeniac Theme, under its stratēgos, Olbianos. The Thracesian Theme wavered between the two rivals, but finally threw its support behind Thomas. More than two-thirds of the empire's Asian army eventually aligned with Thomas, while the defection of the provincial tax officials provided him with much-needed revenue.

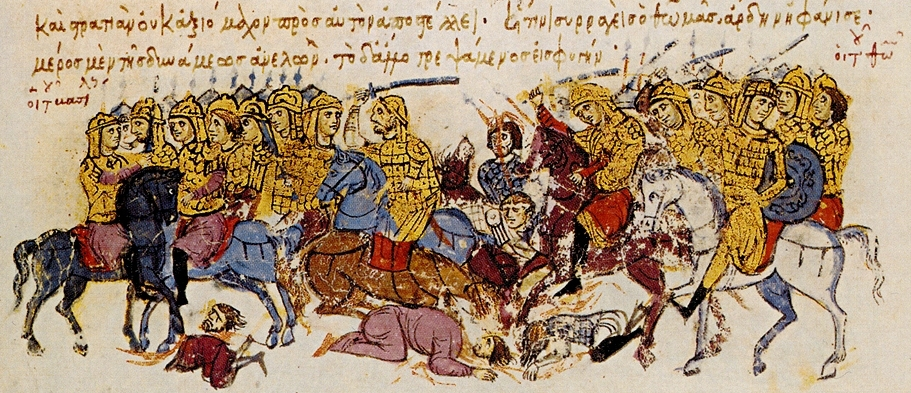
Thomas's troops defeat the forces loyal to Michael II. Miniature from the Madrid Skylitzes.

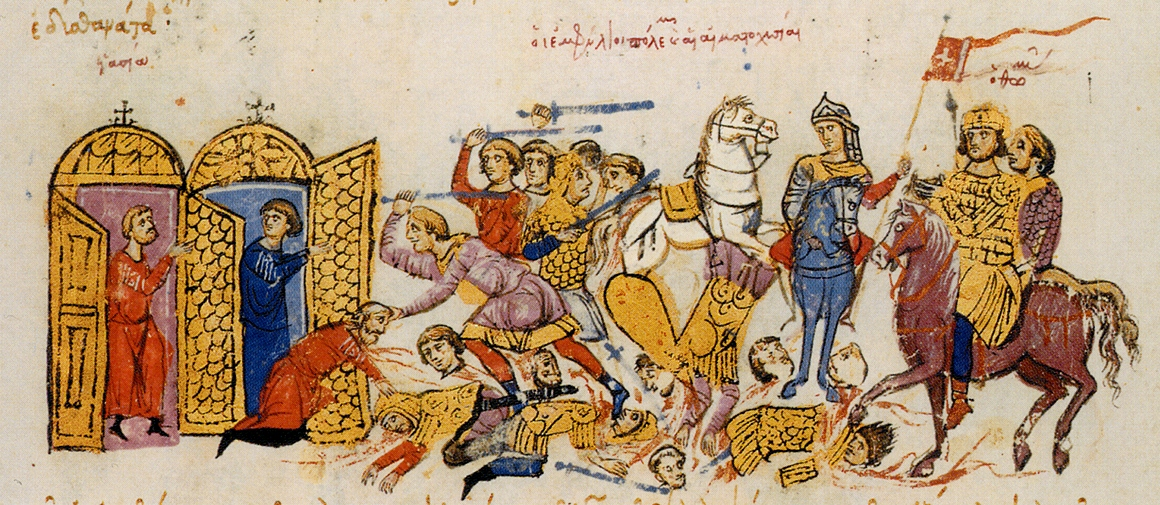
Capture of a city in Asia Minor by Thomas's troops. Miniature from the Madrid Skylitzes.

Michael's first response was to order the Armeniac army to attack Thomas. The Armeniacs were easily defeated in battle and Thomas proceeded through the eastern parts of the Armeniac Theme to occupy the frontier region of Chaldia. His conquest of the Armeniac province was left incomplete because the Abbasids, taking advantage of the Byzantine civil war, launched raids by land and sea against southern Asia Minor, where Thomas had left few troops. Instead of returning to face these raids, Thomas launched a large-scale invasion of his own against Abbasid territory in spring 821, either in Syria (according to Bury and others) or in Arab-held Armenia (according to Treadgold). Thomas then sent an emissary to Caliph al-Ma'mun, who was sufficiently impressed by Thomas's show of force to receive his proposals, especially in view of the Caliphate's own problems with the rebellion of the Khurramites under Babak Khorramdin. Thomas and Ma'mun concluded a treaty of peace and mutual alliance. The Caliph allowed Thomas to recruit men from Arab-ruled territories, and gave leave for him to cross the border and travel to Arab-held Antioch, where he was crowned emperor by the iconophile Patriarch of Antioch, Job. In exchange, Thomas is said to have promised to cede unspecified territories and become a tributary vassal of the Caliph, though the agreement's exact terms are left unclear in the primary sources. At about the same time, Thomas adopted a young man of obscure origin, whom he named Constantius and made his co-emperor.

Meanwhile, Michael II tried to win support among the iconophiles by appointing a relative of his as Archbishop of Ephesus, but his plan failed when the latter refused to be consecrated by the avowedly iconoclast Patriarch Antony I Kassimates. In an effort to consolidate his hold on the provinces, and especially the two Asian themes still loyal to him, Michael proclaimed a 25 percent reduction in taxes for 821–822.

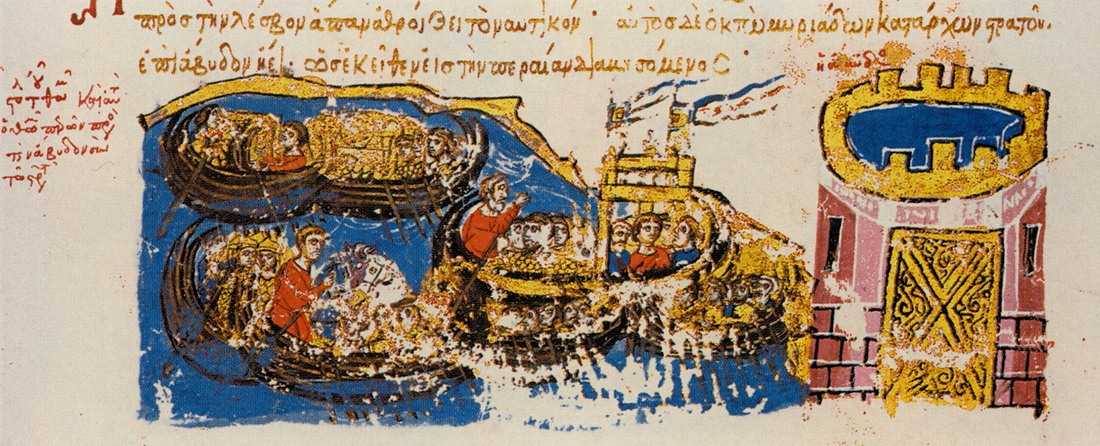
Thomas and his fleet cross from Abydos to Thrace. Miniature from the Madrid Skylitzes.

By summer 821, Thomas had consolidated his position in the East, though the Opsikion and Armeniac themes still eluded his control. He set his sights on the ultimate prize, Constantinople, the possession of which alone conferred full legitimacy to an emperor. Thomas assembled troops, gathered supplies, and built siege machines. To counter the powerful imperial fleet stationed in the capital, he built new ships to augment his existing fleet, which came from the Cibyrrhaeot and Aegean Sea naval themes, and possibly included task forces from the theme of Hellas. Thomas recalled Gregory Pterotos, a general and nephew of Leo V whom Michael had exiled to the island of Skyros, and gave him command of the fleet. By October, the thematic fleets loyal to Thomas had finished assembling at Lesbos, and Thomas's army began marching from the Thracesian Theme towards Abydos, where he intended to cross over into Europe.

At this point, Thomas suffered his first reversal of fortune: before his departure for Abydos, he had sent an army under his adoptive son Constantius against the Armeniacs. Constantius was ambushed by stratēgos Olbianos and killed, although the army was able to withdraw with relatively few casualties. Constantius's severed head was sent to Michael, who dispatched it to Thomas at Abydos. Thomas was undaunted by this relatively minor setback, and crossed over into Europe some time in late October or early November. There, Constantius was soon replaced as co-emperor by another obscure individual, a former monk whom Thomas also adopted and named Anastasius.

=== Siege of Constantinople ===
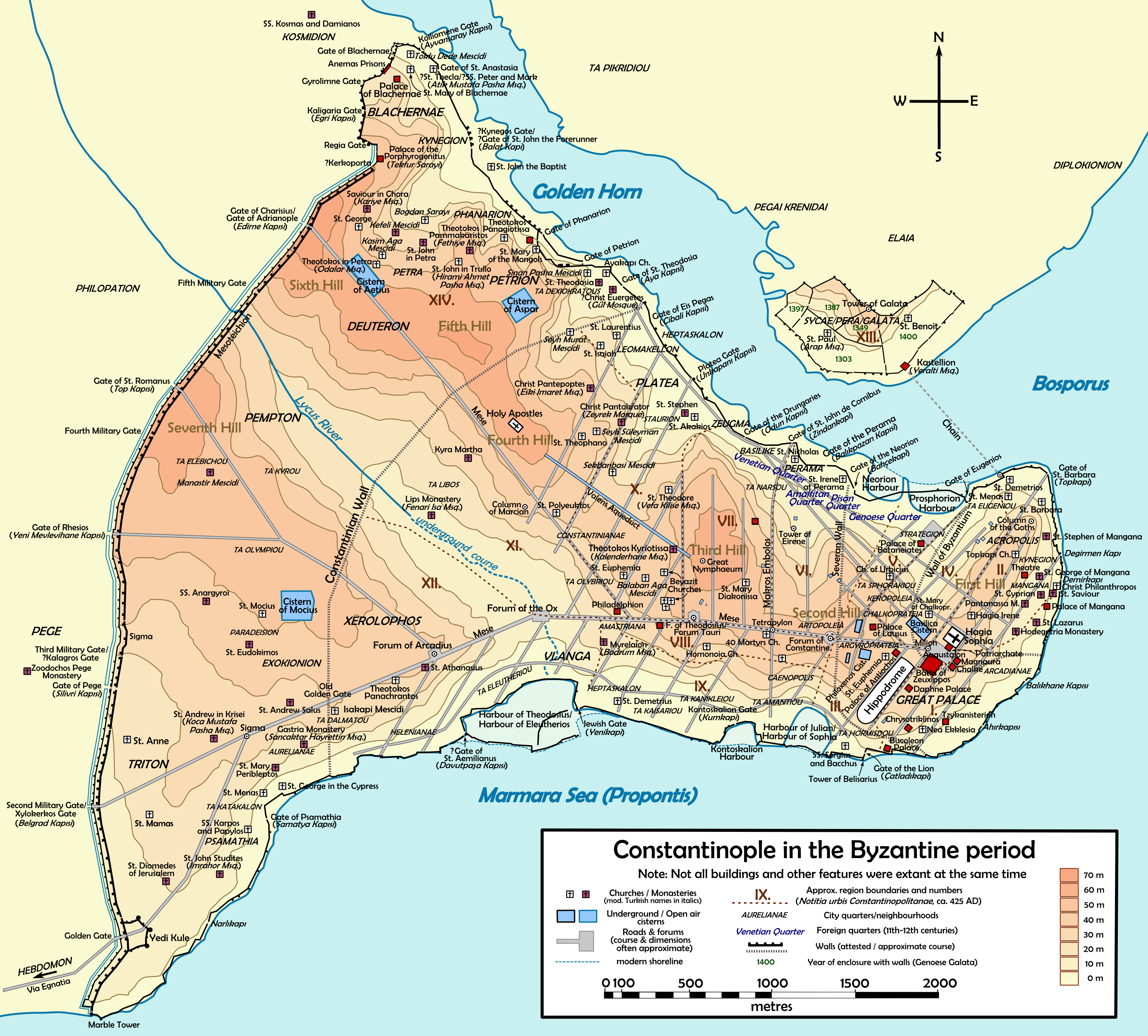
Constantinople and its walls during the Byzantine era

Anticipating Thomas's move, Michael had gone out at the head of an army to the themes of Thrace and Macedonia in Constantinople's European hinterland and strengthened the garrisons of several fortresses there to secure the loyalty of their populace. When Thomas landed, the people of the European themes welcomed him with enthusiasm, and Michael was forced to withdraw to Constantinople. Volunteers, including many Slavs, flocked to Thomas's banner. As he set out towards Constantinople, chroniclers recount that his army swelled to some 80,000 men. The capital was defended by the imperial tagmata, augmented by reinforcements from the Opsikion and Armeniac themes. Michael had ordered the city walls to be repaired, and chained off the entrance to the Golden Horn, while the imperial fleet further guarded the capital from the sea. Nevertheless, judging from Michael's passive stance, his forces were inferior to Thomas's; Warren Treadgold estimates Michael's army to have numbered approximately 35,000 men.

Thomas's fleet arrived at the capital first. Facing no opposition from the imperial fleet, the rebels broke or unfastened the chain and entered the Golden Horn, taking station near the mouths of the Barbysos river, where they awaited the arrival of Thomas and his army. Thomas arrived in early December. The sight of his huge force did not cow the capital's inhabitants: unlike the provinces, the capital's citizens and garrison stood firmly behind Michael. To further encourage his troops, Michael had his young son Theophilos lead a procession along the walls, carrying a piece of the True Cross and the mantle of the Virgin Mary, while a large standard was hoisted on top of the Church of St. Mary at Blachernae, in full view of both armies.

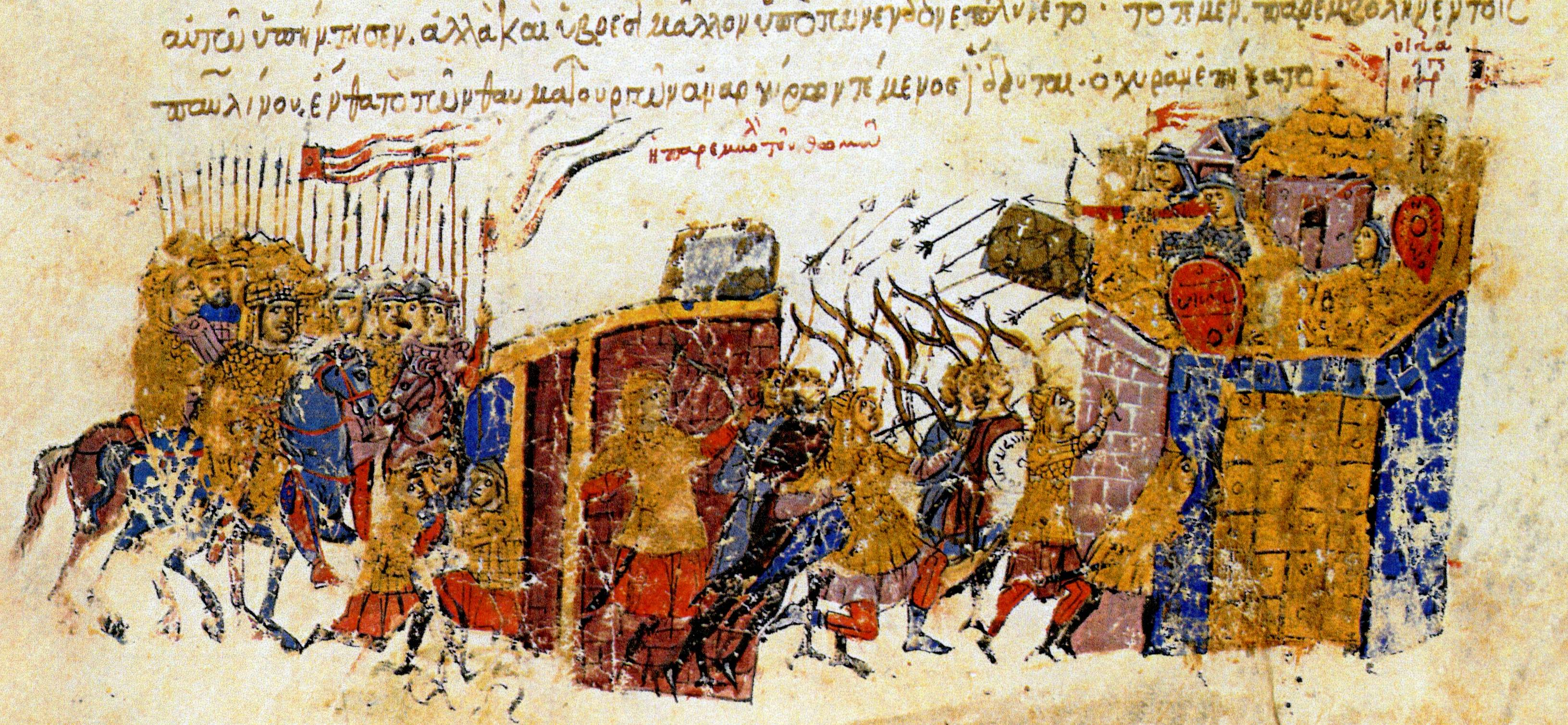
Thomas and his army assail Constantinople. Miniature from the Madrid Skylitzes.

After subduing the cities around the capital, Thomas resolved to attack Constantinople from three sides, perhaps hoping his assault would impress its inhabitants or lead to defections. His deputies Anastasius and Gregory Pterotos would attack the Theodosian land and sea walls, respectively, while he would lead the main attack against the less formidable defenses protecting Blachernae. All of Thomas's forces were amply supplied with siege engines and catapults, and his fleet fielded quantities of Greek fire in addition to large shipborne catapults. Each of Thomas's attacks failed: the defenders' artillery proved superior and kept Thomas's engines away from the land walls, while adverse winds hindered the fleet from taking any meaningful action. Deciding that operations in the midst of winter were hazardous and unlikely to succeed, Thomas suspended all further attacks until spring and withdrew his army to winter quarters.

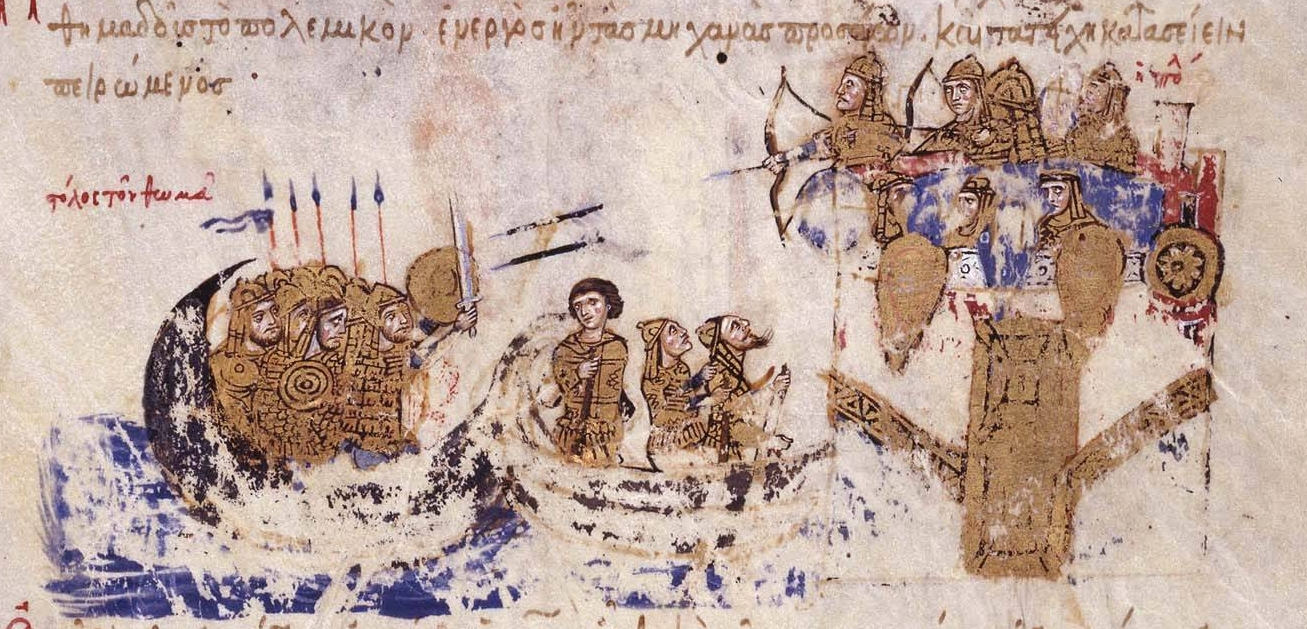
Repulse of the attack of Thomas's fleet on the seaward walls of Constantinople. Miniature from the Madrid Skylitzes.

Michael used the respite to ferry in additional reinforcements from Asia Minor and repair the walls of Blachernae. When Thomas returned in spring, he decided to focus his attack on the Blachernae sector. Before the offensive, Michael himself ascended the walls and addressed Thomas's troops, exhorting them to abandon their commander and promising amnesty if they would defect. Thomas's army viewed the plea as a sign of weakness, and advanced confidently to begin the assault, but as they neared the wall, the defenders opened the gates and attacked. The sudden onslaught drove back Thomas's army; at the same time, the imperial fleet defeated Thomas's ships, whose crews broke and fled to the shore in panic. This defeat diminished Thomas's naval strength, and although he continued blockading the capital by land, the loss demoralized his supporters, who began defecting. Gregory Pterotos, whose family was in Michael's hands, resolved to desert Thomas, followed by a small band of men loyal to him. He departed the rebel camp, headed west, and sent a monk to inform Michael of his defection, but the monk failed to circumvent the blockade and reach the capital. Upon learning of this defection, Thomas reacted quickly: with a select detachment, he followed Gregory, defeated his troops and killed the deserter.

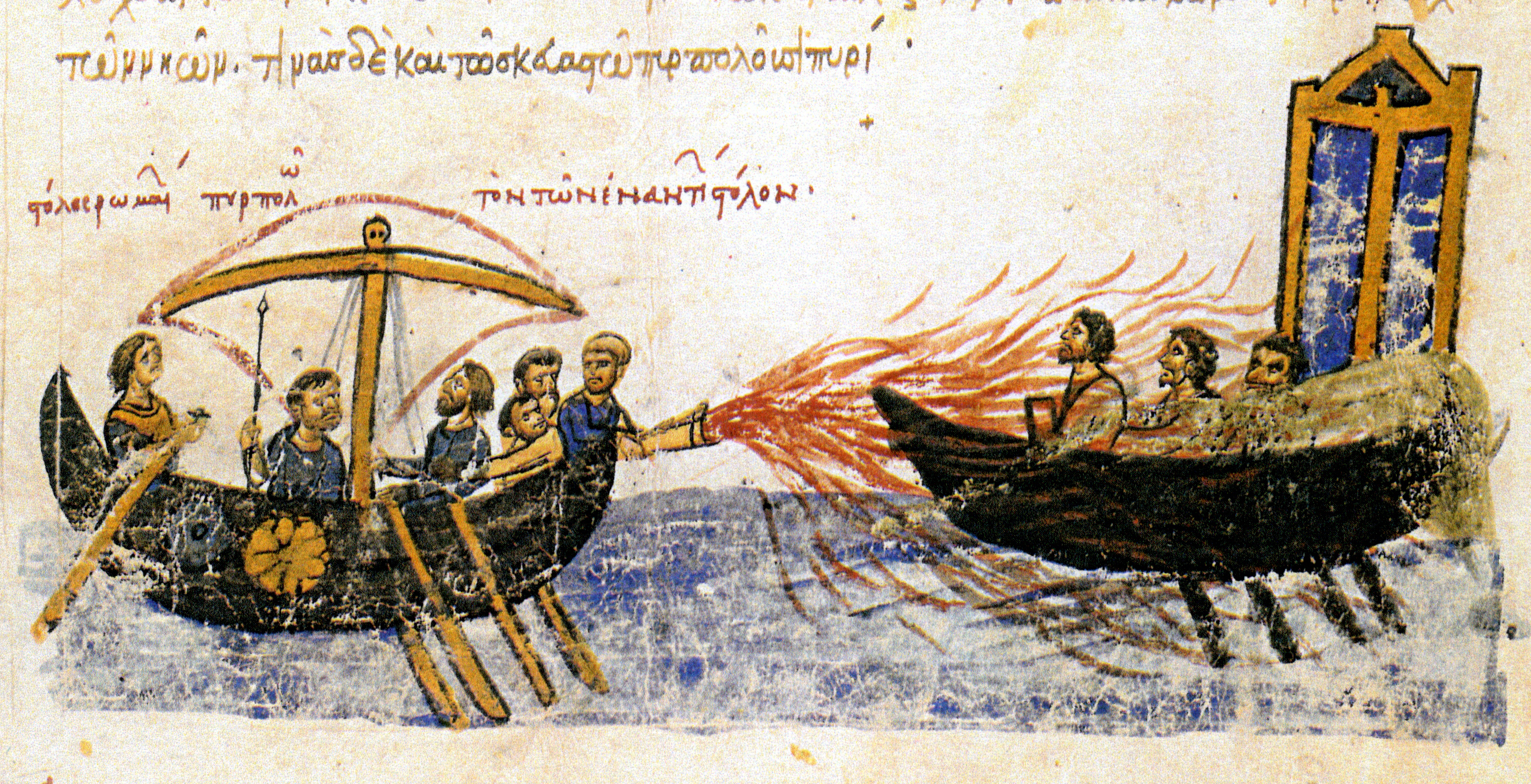
Michael's fleet destroys Thomas's ships using Greek fire. Miniature from the Madrid Skylitzes.

Thomas exploited this small victory for all it was worth, widely proclaiming that he had defeated Michael's troops "by land and sea". He sent messages to the themes of Greece, whose support had been lukewarm until that point, demanding additional ships. The themes responded forcefully, sending their squadrons, allegedly numbering 350 vessels, to join him. Thus reinforced, Thomas decided to launch a two-pronged assault against Constantinople's sea walls, with his original fleet attacking the wall of the Golden Horn, and the new fleet attacking the south coast, looking towards the Sea of Marmara. Michael, however, did not remain idle: his own fleet attacked the thematic force soon after it arrived at its anchorage in Byrida. Using Greek fire, the imperial fleet destroyed many of the rebel vessels and captured most of the remaining ships. Only a few managed to escape and rejoin Thomas's forces.

Through this victory, Michael secured control of the sea, but Thomas's army remained superior on land and continued its blockade of Constantinople. Minor skirmishes ensued for the remainder of the year, with Michael's forces sallying forth from the city to attack Thomas's forces. Although both sides claimed minor successes in these clashes, neither was able to gain a decisive advantage.

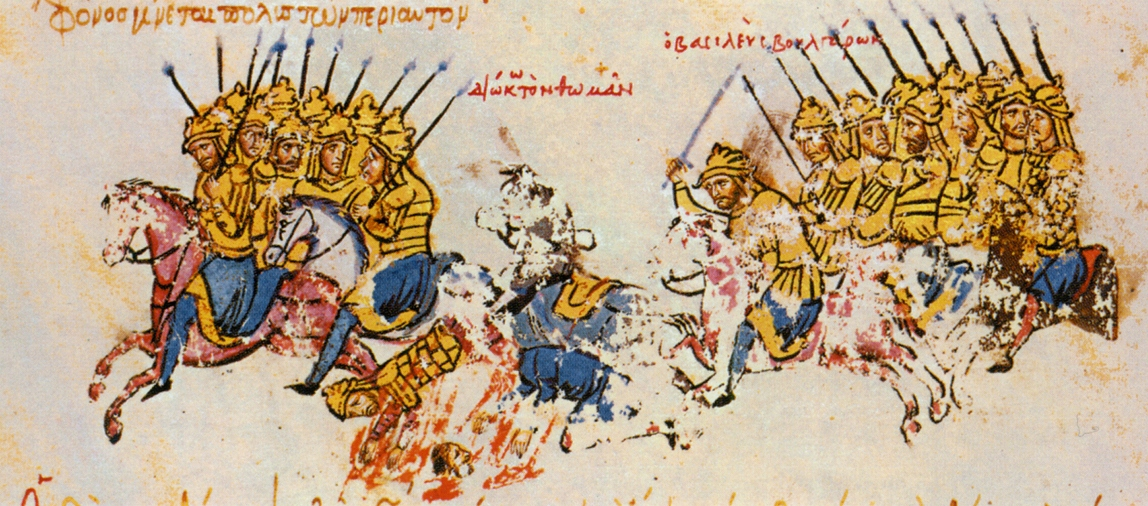
The Bulgarians under Omurtag attack Thomas's army. Miniature from the Madrid Skylitzes.

Michael turned to the empire's northern neighbour, Bulgaria, for help. The two states were bound by a 30-year treaty signed under Leo V, and the Bulgarian ruler, Khan Omurtag (r. 814–831), was happy to respond to Michael's request for assistance. A later tradition, reported by Genesios and Theophanes Continuatus, holds that Omurtag acted of his own accord and against Michael's will, but this is almost universally rejected as a version started or at least encouraged by Michael, who did not wish to be seen encouraging "barbarians" to invade the empire. The Bulgarian army invaded Thrace, probably in November 822 (Bury believes that the Bulgarian attack occurred in spring 823), and advanced towards Constantinople. Thomas raised the siege, and marched to meet them with his army. The two armies met at the plain of Kedouktos near Heraclea (hence known as the Battle of Kedouktos in the Byzantine sources) . The accounts of the subsequent battle differ: the later sources state that Thomas lost the battle, but the near-contemporary George the Monk states that Thomas "killed many Bulgarians". Given the lack of Bulgarian activity after the battle, most modern scholars (with the notable exception of Bury) believe that Thomas won the battle.

=== Defeat and death of Thomas, end of the revolt ===
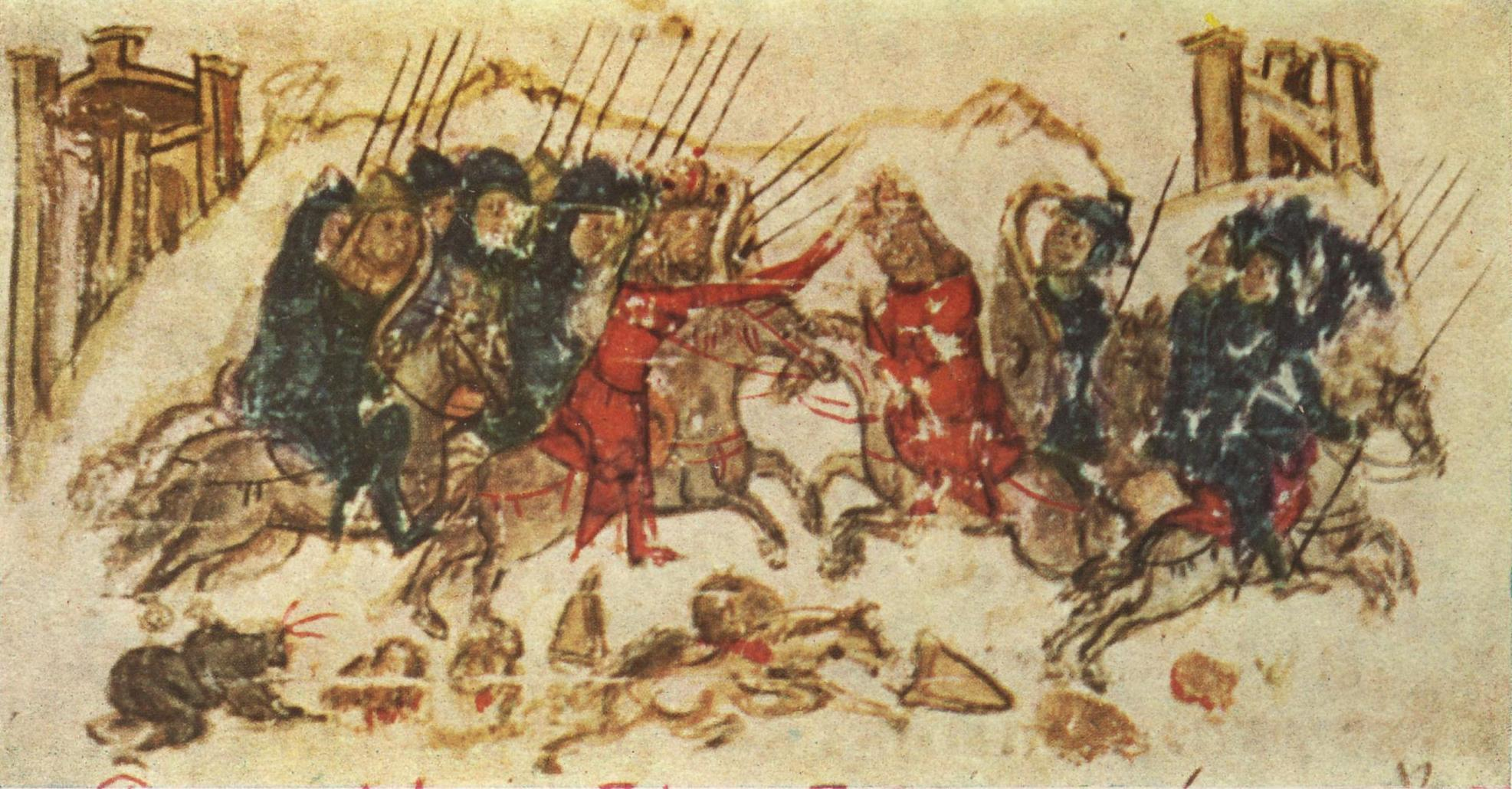
Michael II's army defeats Thomas. Miniature from the Chronicle of Constantine Manasses.

Thomas was unable to resume the siege: aside from the heavy casualties his army likely suffered, his fleet, which he had left behind in the Golden Horn, surrendered to Michael during his absence. Thomas set up camp at the plain of Diabasis some 40 kilometres (25 mi) west of Constantinople, spending winter and early spring there. While a few of his men deserted, the bulk remained loyal. Finally, in late April or early May 823, Michael marched with his troops against Thomas, accompanied by the generals Olbianos and Katakylas with new troops from Asia Minor. Thomas marched to meet them and planned to use a stratagem to outwit his opponents: his men, ostensibly demoralized, would pretend to flee, and when the imperial army broke ranks to pursue them, they would turn back and attack. However, Thomas's troops were by now weary of the prolonged conflict, and their submission was unfeigned. Many surrendered to Michael, while others fled to nearby fortified cities. Thomas sought refuge in Arcadiopolis with a large group; his adopted son Anastasius went with some of Thomas's men to Bizye, and others fled to Panion (also known as Theodosiopolis) and Heraclea.

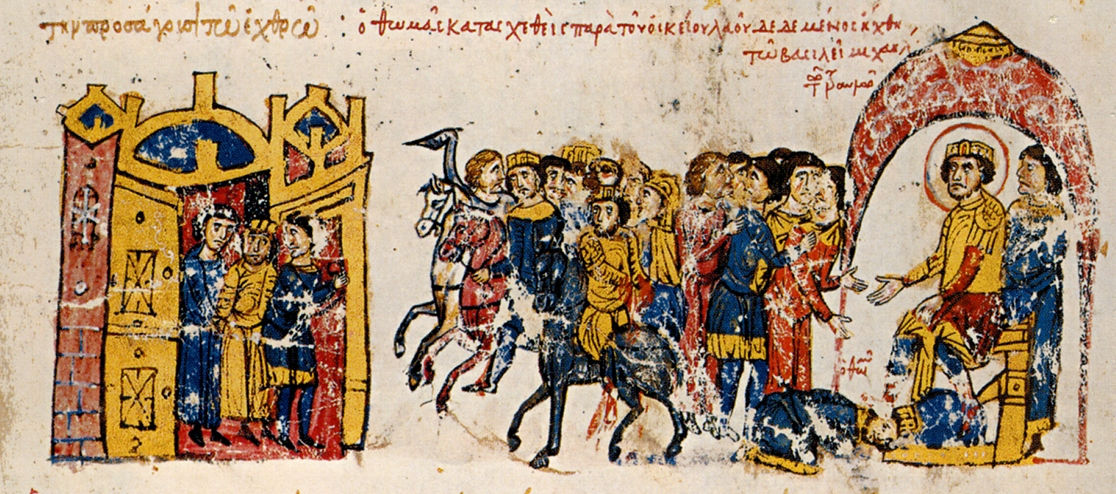
The surrender and humiliation of Thomas, as depicted in the Madrid Skylitzes

Michael blockaded Thomas's cities of refuge but organized no assaults, instead aiming to capture them peacefully by wearing out their defenders. His strategy was motivated by the political and propaganda expedient of appearing merciful—"in order to spare Christian blood", as Michael himself put it in his letter to Louis the Pious—but also, according to the chroniclers, by fear of demonstrating to the Bulgarians that the Byzantine cities' fortifications could fall to attack. In Asia Minor, Thomas's partisans hoped to lure Michael away by allowing the Arabs free passage to raid the provinces of Opsikion and Optimaton, which were loyal to the emperor. Michael was unmoved and continued the blockade. His troops barred access to Arcadiopolis with a ditch. To conserve supplies, the blockaded troops sent away women and children, followed by those too old, wounded, or otherwise incapable of bearing arms. After five months of blockade, Thomas's loyalists were eventually forced to eat starved horses and their hides. Some began deserting by lowering themselves with ropes over the city walls or jumping from them. Thomas sent messengers to Bizye, where the blockade was less close, to arrange a relief attempt by Anastasius. Before anything could be done, however, the exhausted troops at Arcadiopolis surrendered their leader in exchange for an imperial pardon. Thomas was delivered to Michael seated on a donkey and bound in chains. He was prostrated before the emperor, who placed his foot on his defeated rival's neck and ordered his hands and feet cut off and his corpse impaled. Thomas pleaded for clemency with the words "Have mercy on me, oh True Emperor!" Michael only asked his captive to reveal whether any of his own senior officials had had dealings with Thomas. Before Thomas could respond, the Logothete of the Course, John Hexaboulios, advised against hearing whatever claims a defeated rebel might make. Michael agreed, and Thomas's sentence was carried out immediately.

When the inhabitants of Bizye heard of Thomas's fate, they surrendered Anastasius, who suffered the same fate as Thomas. In Panion and Heraclea, Thomas's men held out until an earthquake struck in February 824. The tremor severely damaged the wall of Panion, and the city surrendered. The damage at Heraclea was less severe, but after Michael landed troops at its seaward side, it too was forced to surrender. In Asia Minor, Thomas's loyalists mostly submitted peacefully, but in the Cibyrrhaeot Theme, resistance lingered until suppressed by stratēgos John Echimos. In the Thracesian theme, Thomas's soldiers turned to brigandage. The most serious opposition was offered in central Asia Minor by two officers, who had possibly served Thomas as strategoi: Choireus, with his base at Kaballa northwest of Iconium, and Gazarenos Koloneiates, based at Saniana, southeast of Ancyra. From their strongholds, they spurned Michael's offer of a pardon and the high title of magistros and raided the provinces that had gone over to him. Soon, however, Michael's agents persuaded the inhabitants of the two forts to shut their gates against the officers. Choireus and Koloneiates then tried to seek refuge in Arab territory but were attacked en route by loyalist troops, captured, and crucified.

=== Aftermath and effects ===
The end of Thomas the Slav's great rebellion was marked by Michael II's triumph, held in May 824 in Constantinople. While he executed Thomas's volunteers from the Caliphate and perhaps also the Slavs, the sheer number of individuals involved, the necessity of appearing clement and sparing with Christian lives, and the need to restore internal tranquillity to his realm compelled Michael to treat Thomas's defeated partisans with leniency: most were released after being paraded in the Hippodrome during his celebration, and only the most dangerous were exiled to remote corners of the empire. In an effort to discredit his opponent, Michael authorized an "official" and heavily distorted version of Thomas's life and revolt. The document was written by the deacon Ignatios and published in 824 as Against Thomas. This report quickly became the commonly accepted version of events.

Thomas failed in spite of his qualities and the widespread support he had gained, which brought him control of most of the empire. Lemerle holds that several factors played a role in his defeat: the Asian themes he did not subdue supplied reinforcements to Michael; Thomas's fleet performed badly; and the Bulgarian offensive diverted him away from the capital and weakened his army. But the most decisive obstacles were the impregnable walls of Constantinople, which ensured that an emperor who controlled Constantinople could only be overthrown from within the city.

Thomas's rebellion was the "central domestic event" of Michael II's reign, but it was not very destructive in material terms: except for Thrace, which had suffered from the prolonged presence of the rival armies and the battles fought there, the larger part of the empire was spared the ravages of war. The Byzantine navy suffered great losses, with the thematic fleets in particular being devastated, while the land forces suffered comparatively few casualties. This is traditionally held to have resulted in a military weakness and internal disorder which was swiftly exploited by the Muslims: in the years after Thomas's rebellion, Andalusi exiles captured Crete, and the Aghlabids of Ifriqiya (modern Tunisia) began their conquest of Sicily, while in the East, the Byzantines were forced to maintain a generally defensive stance towards the Caliphate. More recent scholarship has disputed the degree to which the civil war was responsible for Byzantine military failures during these years, citing other reasons to explain them: Warren Treadgold opines that the empire's military forces recovered fairly quickly, and that incompetent military leadership coupled with "the remoteness of Sicily, the absence of regular troops on Crete, the simultaneity of the attacks on both islands, and the government's long-standing lack of interest in sea-power" were far more responsible for the loss of the islands.

== See also ==
- List of Byzantine revolts and civil wars
- List of sieges of Constantinople

== Sources ==
- Bury, John Bagnell (1912). A History of the Eastern Roman Empire from the Fall of Irene to the Accession of Basil I (A.D. 802–867). London: Macmillan and Company. OCLC 458995052.
- Hollingsworth, Paul A.; Cutler, Anthony (1991). "Thomas the Slav". In Kazhdan, Alexander (ed.). The Oxford Dictionary of Byzantium. Oxford and New York: Oxford University Press. p. 2079. ISBN 0-19-504652-8.
- Kaegi, Walter Emil (1981). Byzantine Military Unrest, 471–843: An Interpretation. Amsterdam: Adolf M. Hakkert. ISBN 90-256-0902-3.
- Kiapidou, Irini-Sofia (April 28, 2003). "Rebellion of Thomas the Slav, 821–23". Encyclopaedia of the Hellenic World, Asia Minor. Athens: Foundation of the Hellenic World.
- Codoñer, Juan Signes (2016). The Emperor Theophilos and the East, 829–842: Court and Frontier in Byzantium during the Last Phase of Iconoclasm. Routledge. ISBN 978-1-317-03427-8.
- Lemerle, Paul (1965). "Thomas le Slave". Travaux et mémoires 1 (in French). Paris: Centre de recherche d'histoire et civilisation de Byzance. pp. 255–297. OCLC 457007063.
- Lilie, Ralph-Johannes; Ludwig, Claudia; Pratsch, Thomas; Zielke, Beate (2001). "Thomas "der Slawe" (#8459)". Prosopographie der mittelbyzantinischen Zeit: 1. Abteilung (641–867), Band 5 : Theophylaktos (# 8346) – az-Zubair (# 8675), Anonymi (# 10001–12149) (in German). Berlin and Boston: De Gruyter. pp. 33–38. ISBN 978-3-11-016675-0.
- Ostrogorsky, Georg (1963). Geschichte des Byzantinischen Staates (in German) (3rd ed.). Munich: C. H. Beck'sche Verlagsbuchhandlung. OCLC 301446486.
- Treadgold, Warren (1988). The Byzantine Revival, 780–842. Stanford, California: Stanford University Press. ISBN 978-0-8047-1462-4.
- Vasiliev, Alexander A. (1935). Byzance et les Arabes, Tome I: La dynastie d'Amorium (820–867). Corpus Bruxellense Historiae Byzantinae (in French). Vol. 1. French ed.: Henri Grégoire, Marius Canard. Brussels: Éditions de l'Institut de philologie et d'histoire orientales.
