= Timeline of Eastern Orthodoxy in Greece (717–1204) =

This is a timeline of the presence of Eastern Orthodoxy in Greece from 717 to 1204. The history of Greece traditionally encompasses the study of the Greek people, the areas they ruled historically, as well as the territory now composing the modern state of Greece.

== Era of Byzantine Iconoclasm (717–842) ==
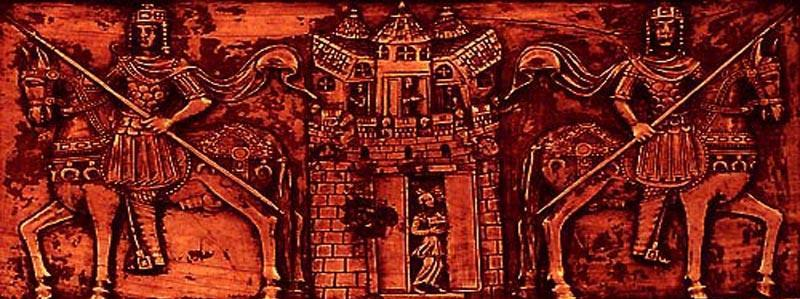
Medieval plate depicting Acrites, the frontiersmen or border guards of the Byzantine Empire, about which epic songs were written.

- 717–18 Accession of Leo III the Isaurian to the Byzantine throne; (Note: With the accession to the throne of a Syrian emperor, Leo III 'the Isaurian', in 717, the use of icons became a matter of hostile state attention.") Second Arab siege of Constantinople. (Note: The use of "Greek fire" and an unusually cold winter helped the Byzantine empire defeat the largest Muslim naval expedition against Constantinople from the Sea of Marmara during their one-year siege of the city. The Arabs were never again able to threaten the city and Christian culture was saved from being overwhelmed by the Muslim Arabs.)
- 720 Martyrdom of Nicholas the New of Vounina, of Larissa.
- 721 Caliph Yazid II banned Christian icons in his kingdom.
- c. 725 John of Damascus resigns his position as chief councilor (protosymboulos) at the court of Damascus, and becomes a monk and priest at the Great Lavra of St. Sabbas the Sanctified; foundation of the Monastery of the Dormition of the Theotokos on Mount Ithome in Messenia, by iconophile monks (Greek: Ιερά Μονή Κοιμήσεως Θεοτόκου Βουλκάνου). (Note: This monastery at the summit of Mount Ithome was abandoned by the Fathers in the year 1625, due to the unbearable cold of the winter months and the difficulty that Christians had in visiting it. They sought a new place to the south and found it where the new monastery now stands.)
- 726 Iconoclast Emperor Leo the Isaurian starts campaign against icons, the Iconoclastic controversy; (Note: The "First Iconoclasm", as it is sometimes called, lasted between about 726 and 787. The "Second Iconoclasm" was between 814 and 842. Traditional explanations for Byzantine iconoclasm have sometimes focused on the importance of Islamic prohibitions against images influencing Byzantine thought. According to Arnold J. Toynbee, for example, it was the prestige of Islamic military successes in the 7th–8th centuries that motivated Byzantine Christians to adopt the Islamic position of rejecting and destroying idolatrous images.) Emperor Leo III (717–41) publishes his Ekloge ton nomon, designed to introduce Christian principle into law. (Note: The Ekloge was a revised law code drawn from the Justinian Code. It was in Greek, it was shorter, and contained many modifications from the Code, reflecting a literal reading of the Bible, canon law, and orientalizing of criminal law.)
- 726–730 John of Damascus wrote three works defending icons, the most important of which was Fountain of Knowledge in three parts, the most important of which was On The Orthodox Faith (De Fide Orthodoxa), a collected summary of the Greek Fathers on major Christian doctrines. (Note: His work became the classic of eastern dogmatics, exercising influence on the west as east. He also presented a fully developed doctrine of the Theotokos including her freedom from stain of sin and her assumption into heaven (the Dormition). He taught that the Eucharistic elements are truly the body and blood of the Lord Jesus Christ, despite appearances. He opposed Islam as a Christian heresy. He also composed canons and is known especially for his Resurrection Canon.)
- 727 The Byzantine themes of Greece rebelled against the iconoclast emperor Leo III and attempted to set up their own emperor, although Leo defeated them. (Note: Up to this time Greece and the Aegean were still technically under the ecclesiastic authority of the Patriarch of the West, but Leo also quarreled with the Pope; the defiant attitude of Popes St. Gregory II and St. Gregory III, who summoned councils in Rome to anathematize and excommunicate the iconoclasts (730, 732) on behalf of image-veneration, led to a fierce quarrel with the emperor. Leo retaliated however by transferring the territories of southern Italy, Greece and the Aegean from the Patriarch of the West to that of the Patriarch of Constantinople, in effect throwing papal influence out of the Empire.)
- 730 Leo III deposed Patriarch Germanos I who refused to sanction the emperor's iconoclastic policy.
- 731 Pope St. Gregory III called an Italian synod that condemned Iconoclasm as heretical. (Note: Pope St. Gregory III was the last Pope to seek the approval of the Byzantine emperor for his consecration.)
- 732–1850 Era of the Patriarchate of Constantinople.
- 732–33 Byzantine Emperor Leo III the Isaurian transfers Southern Italy (Sicily and Calabria), Greece, and the Aegean from the jurisdiction of the Patriarch of the West to that of the Patriarch of Constantinople in response to Pope St. Gregory III's support of a revolt in Italy against iconoclasm, adding to the Patriarchate about 100 bishoprics; (Note: "Views differ as to precisely when this took place. See M. Anastos, 'The transfer of Illyricum, Calabria and Sicily to the Jurisdiction of the patriarchate of Constantinople in 732–733', SBN (=Silloge bizantina in onore di S. G. Mercati), 9 (1957), 14–31, (reprinted Variorum, 1979) who opts for Leo III; V. Grumel, 'L'Annexation de rillyricum oriental, de la Sicile et de la Calabre au patriarcat de Constantinople', Recherches de science religieuse (=Melanges Jules Lebreton, II), 40 (1952), 191–200, puts the case for Constantine V and the pontificate of Stephen II (752–7).) (Note: The Diocese of Moesiae (which later split into two dioceses: the Diocese of Macedonia and the Diocese of Dacia) was the area known as "Eastern Illyricum", and in view of the detailed list of provinces given by Pope St. Nicholas the Great (858–67) in a letter in which he demanded the retrocession of the churches removed from papal jurisdiction in 732-33, this area seems to have been the region affected by Emperor Leo's punitive action. Previously the lands which Leo ΙΙΙ now placed under the authority of the Patriarchate of Constantinople, although subject to the civil rule of the emperor of Constantinople ever since the end of 395, had nevertheless depended upon the Roman patriarchate ecclesiastically, except for a few brief interruptions including: In 421 (when a decree enacted by Emperor Theodosius II placed all churches within the pale of the Illyricum prefecture (then part of the Eastern Empire) subject to the Archbishop of Constantinople).; In 438, through the Theodosian Codex, Illyricum was again placed under Constantinopolitan jurisdiction.; To some extent during the Acacian schism, 484–519.) the Iconoclast emperors took away from the Patriarch of Antioch 24 episcopal sees of Byzantine Isauria, on the plea that he was a subject of the Arab caliphs; the jurisdiction of the Patriarch of Constantinople became co-extensive with the limits of the Byzantine Empire.;
- 734 Death of Peter the Athonite, commonly regarded as one of the first hermits of Mount Athos.
- 739 Byzantine forces defeat a great Umayyad invasion of Asia Minor at Battle of Akroinon, renaming the city Nicopolis (Greek for "city of victory").
- 746 Byzantine forces destroy the Muslim fleet and regain Cyprus from the Arabs.
- c. 750–950 Syrians (both Monophysites and the Nestorians) transmitted to Muslims what was known of Greek pagan thought and whatever other knowledge was available in the Syrian language, also influencing the development of Sufism through their mysticism.
- 751 Cosmas the Melodist, Bishop of Maiuma and foster brother of John of Damascus composed solemn canons in honour of the Nativity, Epiphany and Exaltation of the Holy Cross, fourteen of which are included in the liturgical books of the Byzantine Rite.
- 754 Iconoclastic Council (Council of Hieria) held in Constantinople under the authority of Emperor Constantine V Copronymus, condemning icons and declaring itself to be the Seventh Ecumenical Council; Constantine begins dissolution of the monasteries. (Note: 10 February – 8 August. Three hundred thirty-eight bishops attended the iconoclast council in Constantinople at Hieria and then at Blarchenae for the final session. (It was called by the Orthodox party the "headless synod" because no patriarchs were present, however the council nevertheless asserted the religious authority of emperors as "peers of the apostles".) The Council declared that only the Eucharist is the true image of the Lord Jesus Christ because it is "identical in essence" with what it portrays. Certain definitions were included that toned down the more radical views of the emperors; provided theological arguments attempting to demonstrate that Iconodules were heretics; and anathematized Patriarch Germanus, John of Damascus, and George of Cyprus. The new patriarch of Constantinople, Constantine II, attended the final session. This council began the violent phase of the iconoclast movement, with exiles, executions, confiscation of property and destruction of images. The summary of the council, the Horos, is the only document of this council to survive the iconodule victory because it was quoted verbatim at the council of Nicaea (787).)

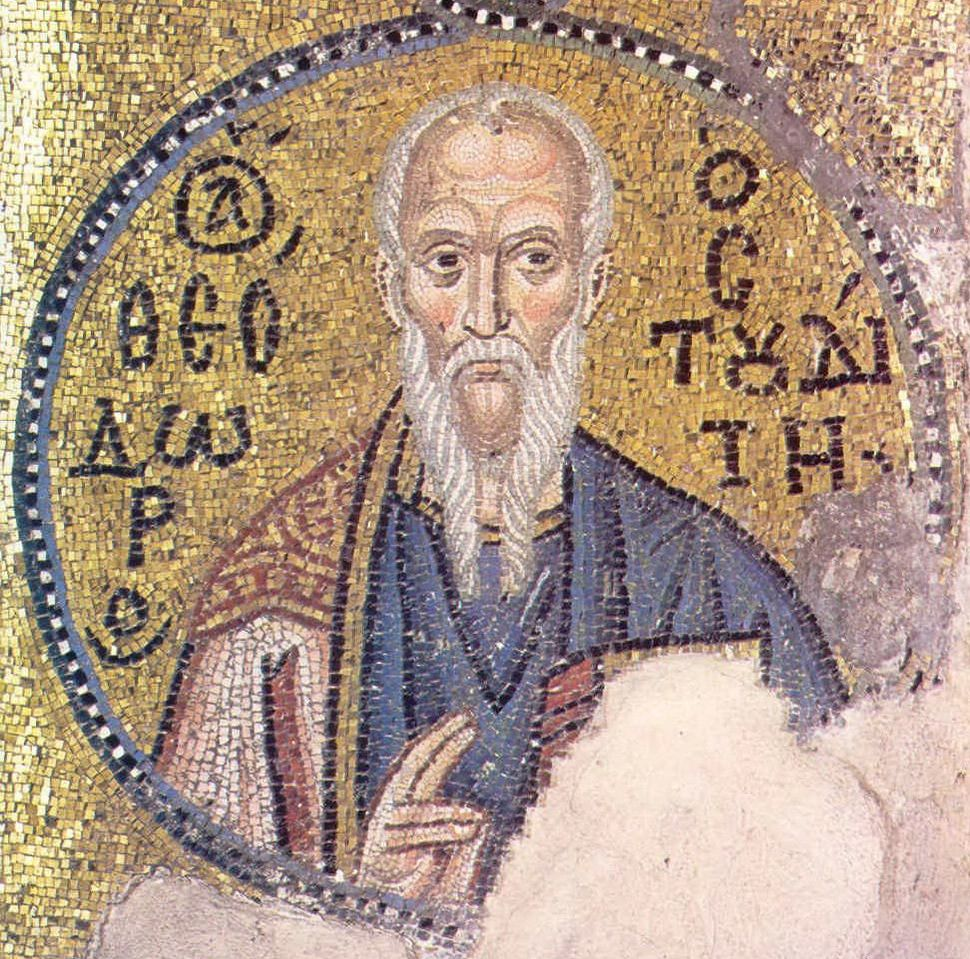
St. Theodore the Studite abbot of the Stoudios monastery in Constantinople and a zealous opponent of iconoclasm

- 766 Byzantine Emperor Constantine V also condemned relics and prayers to the Theotokos and to the Saints, extreme measures that even the Iconoclastic Council (Council of Hieria) had not adopted.
- 767 Martyrdom of Stephen the Younger, Byzantine monk from Constantinople who became one of the leading opponents of the iconoclastic policies of Emperor Constantine V.
- 769 A Roman synod approved the veneration of icons.
- c. 770–772 Byzantine general Michael Lachanodrakon, the strategos (military governor) of the Thracesian Theme and a fanatical supporter of Iconoclasm, dissolved the monasteries and eradicated monasticism within his theme.
- 778–779 Byzantines defeat the Muslim Arabs at Germanikeia and expel them from Anatolia.
- c. 787 Greek Orthodox bishops were resident in Atil, the capital of Khazaria, and in Samkarsh, subject to the authority of the Metropolitan of Doros in Crimea. (Note: "The Khazars' dominions...housed enough Christians of the Eastern Orthodox Rite for a metropolitanate to be devised for them by the Constantinopolitan authorities, probably in the second quarter of the ninth Century (Darrouzes 1981: 31–2, 241–2, 245).")

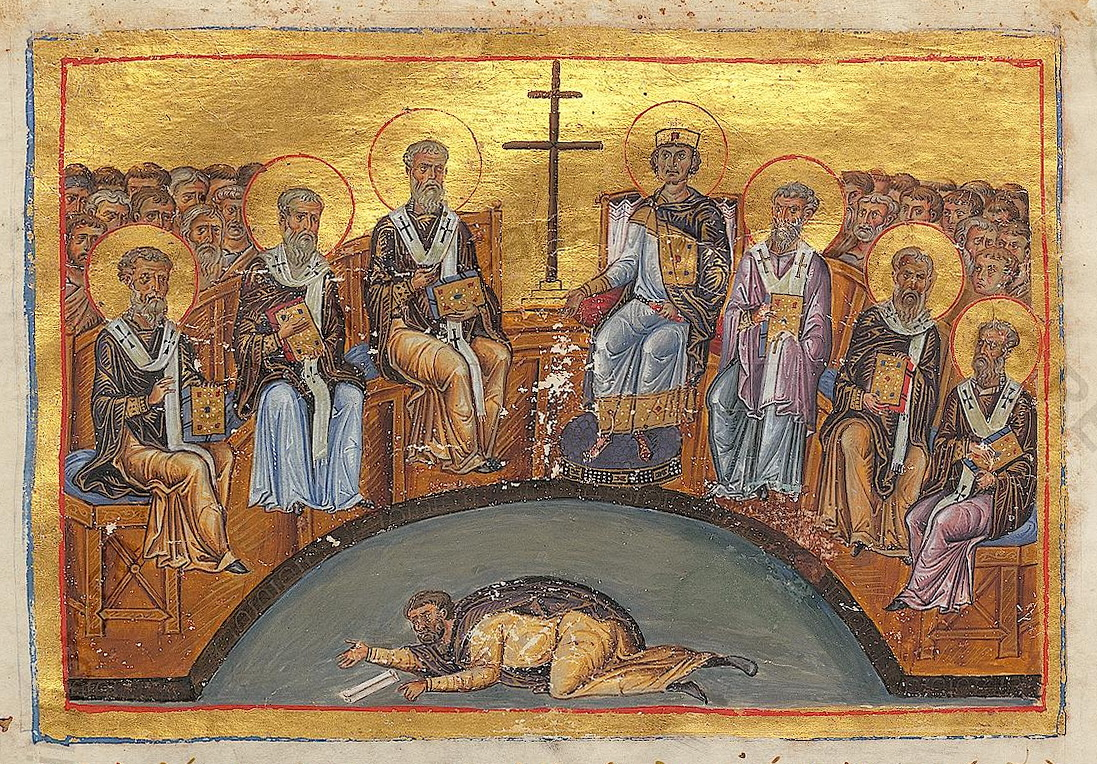
Miniature showing the Second Council of Nicaea

- 787 Seventh Ecumenical Council held in Nicaea, condemning iconoclasm and affirming veneration of icons. (Note: 24 September – 23 October. The Seventh Ecumenical Council (Second Council of Nicaea) was convened by Emperor Constantine VI, establishing the orthodoxy of the veneration of icons; condemning Iconoclasm as heretical; drawing a distinction between latreia or "adoration", reserved for God alone, and proskynesis or "veneration" to be accorded to icons and relics; and having 22 disciplinary canons. The Latin translation that was presented to the Pope was poor and therefore inaccurate, which elicited a response from the Franks who rejected it, even though Pope Hadrian I supported it. No supporters of Iconoclasm offered any open resistance.)
- 792 Death of Philaret the Merciful, of Amnia in Asia Minor.
- 799 Theodore the Studite and many followers moved from the Sakkudion Monastery in Bithynia to the old Monastery of Stoudios in Constantinople, reorganizing life there in line with the Rules of St. Basil, with the Studion becoming the model for monastic life in the Orthodox Church and influencing the development of monastic life on Mount Athos.
- 803 Death of Irene of Athens, wife of Byzantine Emperor Leo IV; St. Luke's icon brought to Agiassos on Mytilene.
- 810–814 Theophanes the Confessor compiled the Chronicle, continuing the historical work of George Syncellus, covering the years 284–814.
- 814 Bulgarians lay siege to Constantinople; conflict erupts between Emperor Leo V and Patr. Nicephorus on the subject of iconoclasm; Leo deposes Nicephorus, Nicephorus excommunicates Leo.

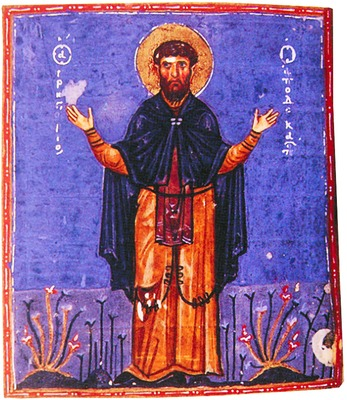
Venerable Gregory Decapolites, the New Wonderworker

- 815 A synod in the Church of Hagia Sophia affirmed the Iconoclastic Council (Council of Hieria), annulled the Seventh Ecumenical Council (Nicaea II), and recognized the Acta of the iconoclast council of 754.
- 816 Death of Gregory Decapolites.
- 818 Vikings known as Rus' plunder the north coast of Anatolia, marking the first known raid of Rus' or Russians, on territory in the Byzantine Empire.
- 824 Byzantine Crete falls to Arab insurgents fleeing from the Umayyad Emir of Cordoba Al-Hakam I, establishing an emirate on the island until the Byzantine reconquest in 960.
- 826 Death of Theodore the Studite.
- 827 Beginning of the Saracen invasion of Byzantine Sicily, which lasted from 827 to 902. (Note: The first Arab battle against Byzantine troops occurred on 15 July 827, near Mazara, resulting in an Aghlabid victory. It took over a century for Byzantine Sicily to be conquered. Syracuse held out for a long time, and Taormina fell in 902. Eventually all of Sicily was conquered by the Arabs in 965, and the Emirate of Sicily was formed, an Islamic state on the island of Sicily which existed from 965 to 1072.)
- 828 Death of Patr. Nicephorus I of Constantinople.
- c. 829–842 Icon of Panagia Proussiotissa (Mother of God of Proussa) is re-discovered near Karpenissi in Greece, after it had been lost during its transportation from Asia Minor in 829 to save it from iconoclasm; (Note: The Monastery of Proussos in Karpenisi (in the Evrytania region of Greece), was named after the Holy Icon of Panagia of Prousa (in Minor Asia). According to holy tradition, this icon was painted by Saint Luke the Evangelist. The icon was brought to the mainland of Greece to save it from iconoclasm during the period of iconoclastic Byzantine Emperor Theophilos (829–842). The Monastery of Proussos in Karpenisi was founded during this period on the site where the icon was re-discovered. Its feast day is 23 August (the Leavetaking of the Dormition of the Mother of God), and it is visited by crowds of pilgrims each year from 15 to 23 August to venerate the Icon of the All-Holy Mother of God of Prousa.) influence of Muslim culture on Byzantines is at a high point during the reign of Emperor Theophilus.
- 833 Emperor Theophilus began a persecution of iconophiles in the face of several defeats by Muslim Arabs who intended to construct a chain of permanent bases from Tyana to Constantinople, with Theophilus being confirmed in his persecution when the caliph died and the Arabs withdrew.
- 838 John VII the Grammarian, Patriarch of Constantinople, enacted a harsh persecution of iconophiles, mostly against monks; in August, Caliph al-Mu'tasim captures and destroys Amorium in Anatolia, killing half the inhabitants.
- c. 839 First Rus'–Byzantine War, where the Rus' attacked Propontis (probably aiming for Constantinople) before turning east and raiding Paphlagonia.
- c. 840 Turks began to move into the Islamic world of the Eastern Mediterranean, as mercenaries and military slaves (Mamluks) of the Muslim Arabs.

== Byzantine Imperial era (843–1204) ==
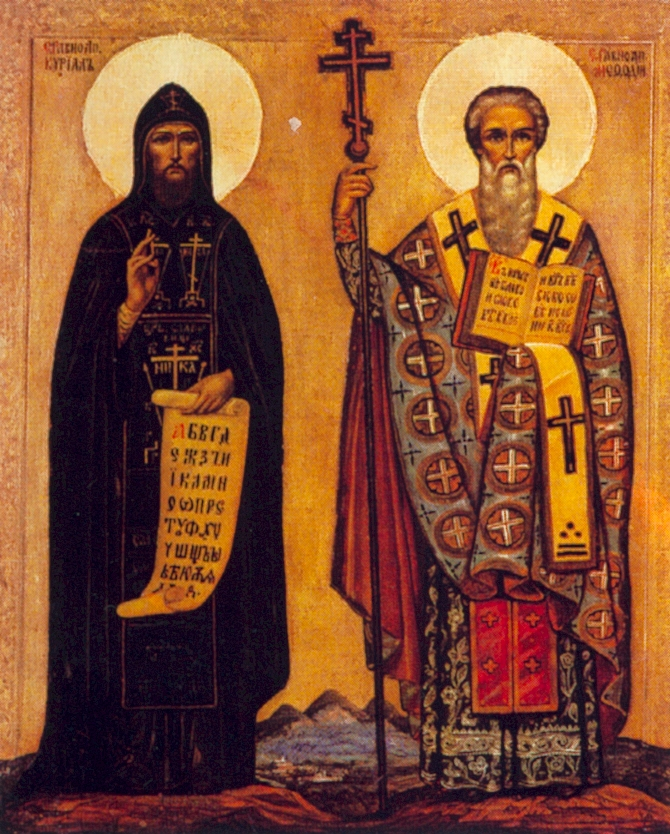
Saints Cyril and Methodius, Equals-to-the-Apostles

- 843 Empress Theodora secures return of icon-veneration with Triumph of Orthodoxy occurring on first Sunday of Great Lent, restoring icons to churches; (Note: March 843, Theodora calls council, not of bishops but of other selected officials, which accepts the council of 787 and thereby condemning iconoclasm. The council having met and restored the veneration of icons on the first Sunday of Lent, this day is celebrated as Feast of Orthodoxy. Synodicon and commemorations take shape gradually.) the monks of Mount Athos send a delegation to Constantinople to celebrate the restoration of the veneration of icons; Theodora, regent of Byzantine emperor, persecutes Paulicians, killing many and confiscating their property, but many escape to Muslim Arab lands; reconquest of Crete from Muslims by Theoctistus, Logothete under Theodora, but island is not held long.
- 845 Execution of the 42 Martyrs of Amorium, who were taken as hostages from Amorium to Samarra in 838; the work of Dionysius of Tel Mahre provides clear understanding that Islam is a different religion rather than a Christian heresy.
- 846 Death of Joannicius the Great.
- 850 Third Finding of the head of John the Forerunner; conversion of Slavs in the Peloponnese. (Note: "Nicholas Cheetham claims that the Orthodox Church made intense efforts to convert the Slavs in Greece, and that this took effect more or less in the period from A.D. 800 to 1000, only when the Greek language had ousted Slavonic.")
- 858 St. Ignatius of Constantinople is deposed; Photius becomes patriarch of Constantinople. Both appeal to Pope St. Nicholas the Great; the Pope sends two legates, Rodoald of Porto and Zachary of Anagni, with cautious letters. The legates are to hear both sides and report to him.
- 860 Second Rus-Byzantine War, a naval raid and the first siege of Constantinople by the Rus'; Photios, Patriarch of Constantinople dips the Holy Robe of the Theotokos into the sea and a storm drives away the invading Russians.
- c. 860 Christianization of the Kievan Rus'. (Note: Most Soviet historians (Boris Grekov, Vladimir Pashuto, Rybakov) agree that Christianity was adopted in the 9th century only by the Varangian elite of Rus'. That the fact of the first Christianization was obliterated so rapidly is explained by the 882 coup d'état that led to the downfall of the supposedly Christian Askold and the usurpation of power by the pagan Oleg. Tatischev went so far as to style Askold "the first Russian martyr". Constantine Zuckerman rejects Rybakov's view that Photius converted the Kievan Rus'.)
- 861 Cyril and Methodius of Thessaloniki depart from Constantinople to missionize the Slavs; First Photian synod, confirms the deposition of St. Ignatius and the succession of Photius as patriarch and passes 17 canons; taking heavy bribes, the attending papal legates agree, but their approval was annulled by the Pope.
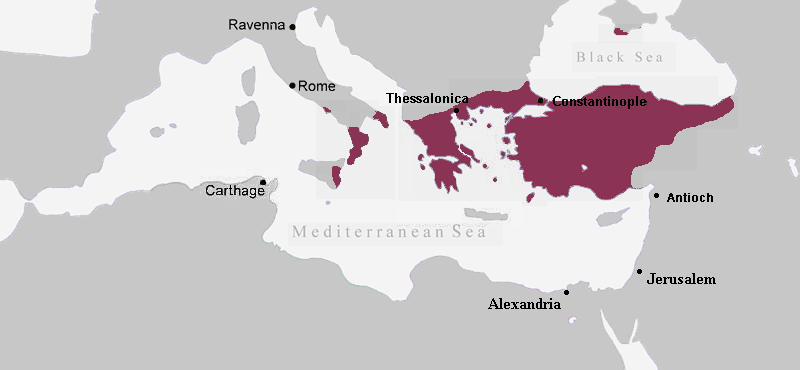
  Byzantine Empire, c. 867
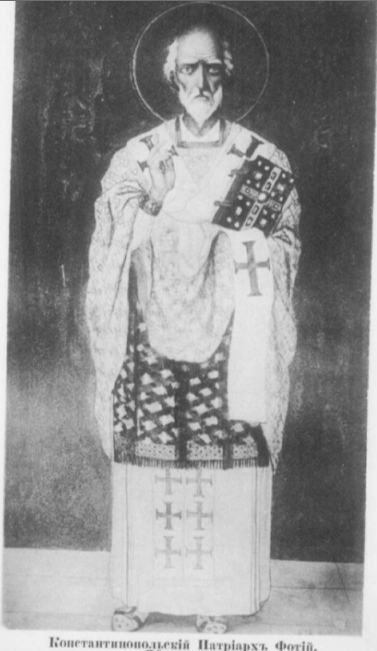
  Photius I of Constantinople
- 863 Cyril and Methodius arrive in Moravia in the autumn, replacing Latin missionaries and introducing the Slavonic Liturgy instead of the Latin mass; Cyril and Methodius develop the Glagolitic script for Slavic languages, which is later displaced by Cyrillic script developed in Bulgaria. Pope St. Nicholas the Great holds a synod at the Lateran in which the two legates who agreed to the Photian synod of 861 are tried, degraded, and excommunicated. The synod repeats Nicholas's decision, that Ignatius is lawful Patriarch of Constantinople; Photius is to be excommunicate unless he retires at once from his usurped place.
- 864 Christianization of Bulgaria: Baptism of Prince Boris of Bulgaria; (Note: Byzantine empire attacks Bulgaria, causing Khan Boris to give in and receive baptism from Greeks. Although Michael III, Byzantine Emperor, is godfather, Boris does not decide between claims of Rome and Constantinople for jurisdiction.) Synaxis of the Theotokos of Miasena in memory of the return of her icon.
- 867 Second Photian synod held, presided over by Photius, which anathematizes Pope St. Nicholas the Great for his objections to the displacement of Latin missionaries in Bulgaria by Greeks and use by papal missionaries of Filioque; Pope St. Nicholas dies before hearing news of excommunication; Basil the Macedonian has Emperor Michael III murdered and usurps Imperial throne, reinstating St. Ignatius as patriarch of Constantinople; death of Kassia, Greek-Byzantine poet and hymnographer, who composed the Hymn of Kassiani, chanted during Holy Week on Holy Wednesday.
- c. 867 Constantinople sends a bishop to Russia; Byzantine missions sent to Serbia and Croatia.
- 869–870 Eighth Ecumenical Council held in Constantinople passing twenty-seven canons, deposes Photius from the Constantinopolitan see and restores St. Ignatius on the throne, anathematizes the followers of Photius.
- 870 Conversion of Serbia, when they ask for Byzantine missionaries and come under the jurisdiction of Constantinople; (Note: The establishment of Christianity as state religion dates to the time of Prince Mutimir and Byzantine Emperor Basil I (r. 867–886).) the pilgrim Bernard the Monk, in his Itinerary, gives the first description of the Holy Fire in 870; Malta conquered from the Byzantines by the Arabs.
- 874 Translation of relics of Nicephorus the Confessor, interred in the Church of the Holy Apostles; Constantinople sends an Archbishop to Russia.
- 877 Death of St. Ignatius I of Constantinople; Photius is appointed to succeed him.
- 878 Arab Muslims conquer the historic city of Syracuse from Byzantium during the Muslim conquest of Sicily (827–902), with the population massacred or enslaved and the city thoroughly looted over two months.
- 879–880 Robber Council of 879–880 held, confirming Photius as Patriarch of Constantinople, declaring itself to be the "Eighth Ecumenical Council." The papal legates, like their predecessors in 861, agreed to everything the majority desired; as soon as they had returned to Rome, Photius sent the acts to the Pope for his confirmation. Instead, Pope John VIII again excommunicated him, resulting in the schism breaking out again.
- 881 Death of Theoktiste of Lesbos.
- 883 Mount Athos receives its first imperial privilege and gains autonomy, as Emperor Basil I lays down the boundaries of the monastic republic.
- c. 884 Saint Elias the Younger founds a monastery on Mount Aulinas at Palmi, in the province of Reggio Calabria in Calabria, later named after him, likely being the first of the Greek monasteries in South Italy that are mentioned in the Lives of the Saints. (Note: We ought tentatively to regard it as probable that the saints whose lives have come down to us were really the founders of Greek monasticism in South Italy, and that before their time there were no Greek monasteries in the district. There probably were hermits; but the rise of monasteries does not begin before the end of the ninth century; and the leaders of the monks were Elias Junior (†903), Elias Spelaeotes ("the Cave-Dweller", †c. 960), Lucas of Demena (†984), Vitalis of Castronuovo (†994), and St. Nilus of Rossano (†1004).)
- 885 Death of Methodius.
- 886 Death of Joseph the Hymnographer. Second Photian schism ends.
- 888 Byzantine Emperor Leo VI the Wise promulgates the Basilika, or Imperial Code, in sixty books, preserving Justinian's Code, and also including works of law initiated by Basil I, including the Procheiron, and the Epanagoge.
- 892 Death of Theodora the Myrrh-gusher of Thessaloniki.

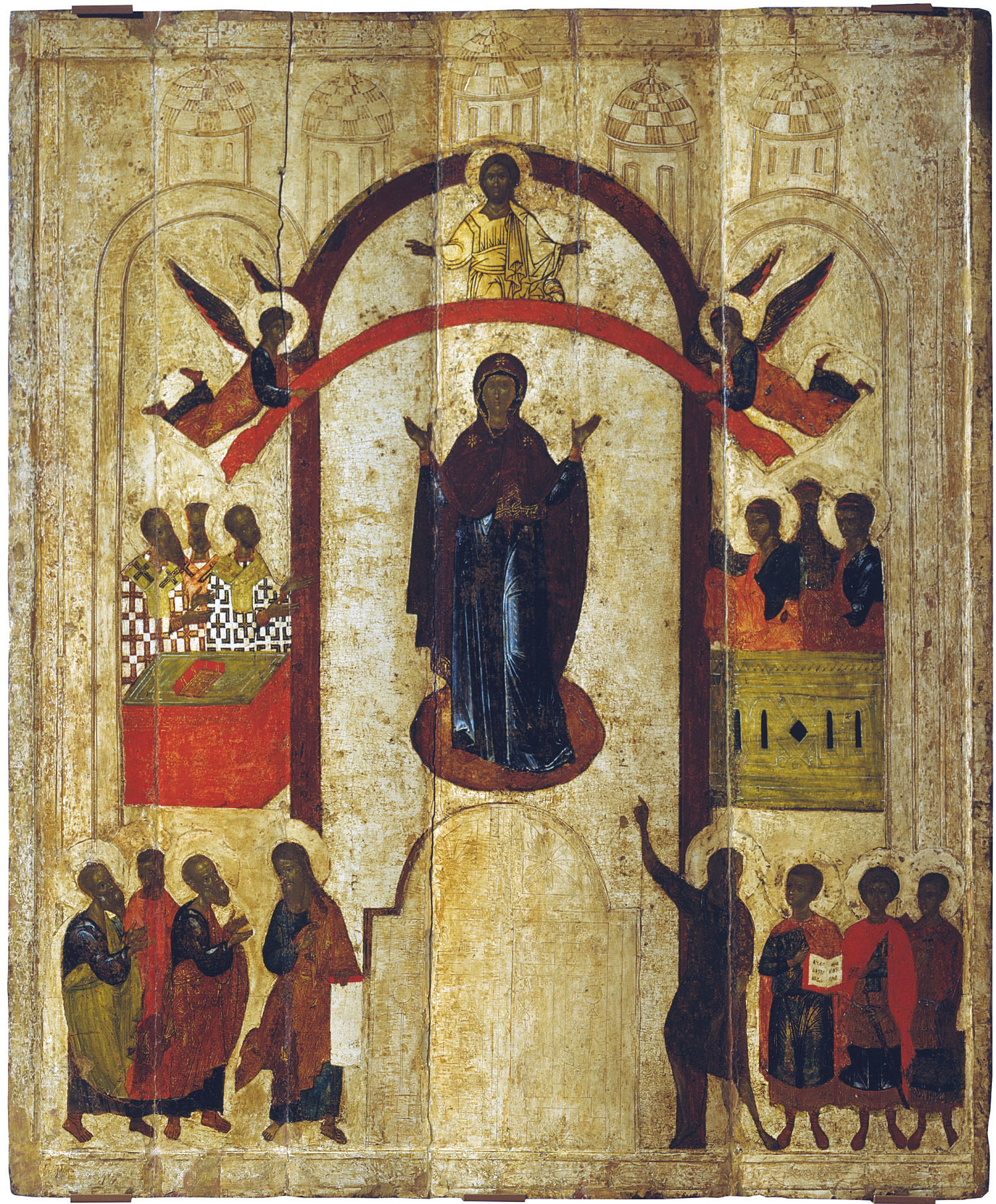
The Holy Protection of the Mother of God (Novgorod icon, 1399)

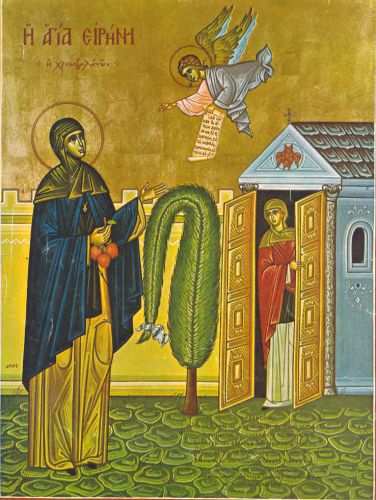
Venerable Irene Chrysovolantou of Cappadocia, Abbess of Chrysovalantou

- 902 Taormina, the last Byzantine stronghold in Sicily, is captured by the Aghlabids, after a siege of two years.
- 904 Thessaloniki sacked and pillaged by Saracen pirates under Leo of Tripoli, a Greek pirate serving Saracen interests.
- 907 Third Rus'–Byzantine War, a naval raid of Constantinople (Tsargrad in Old Slavonic) led by Varangian Prince Oleg of Novgorod, which was relieved by peace negotiations.
- 908 Mount Athos becomes independent of the coenobia outside of the Athonite peninsula, and the office of Protos, as leader and representative of all the monks, is attested to for the first time.
- 911 Holy Protection of the Virgin Mary; Russian envoys visit Constantinople to ratify a treaty, sent by Oleg, Grand Prince of Rus'.
- 912 Nicholas Mystikos restored as Patriarch of Constantinople (912–925); death of Irene Chrysovalantou, abbess of the monastery of Chrysovalantou.

c. 915 Death of Leo Luke of Corleone, the Abbot and Wonderworker of the Monastery of Mount Mula in Calabria, (Note: Mount Mula, or Monte La Mula (1935 m), is one of the highest peaks of the Orsomarso mountains, near Cassano.) and a founder of Italo-Greek monasticism in Southern Italy, having died a centenarian, after eighty years of monastic life.

- 925 Death of Peter the Wonderworker and Bp. of Argos, whose writings appear in Patrologia Graeca.
- 941 Fourth Rus'–Byzantine War;
- 941–942 Romanos I Lecapenos makes the first known imperial grant to the monks of Mount Athos, of one gold coin per monk, per annum.
  Byzantine Themes in Asia Minor, c. 950
- 943 The authorities officially define the boundary between the city of Ierissos and the monastic community of Athos.
- 944 City of Edessa recovered by Byzantine army, including Icon Not Made By Hands.

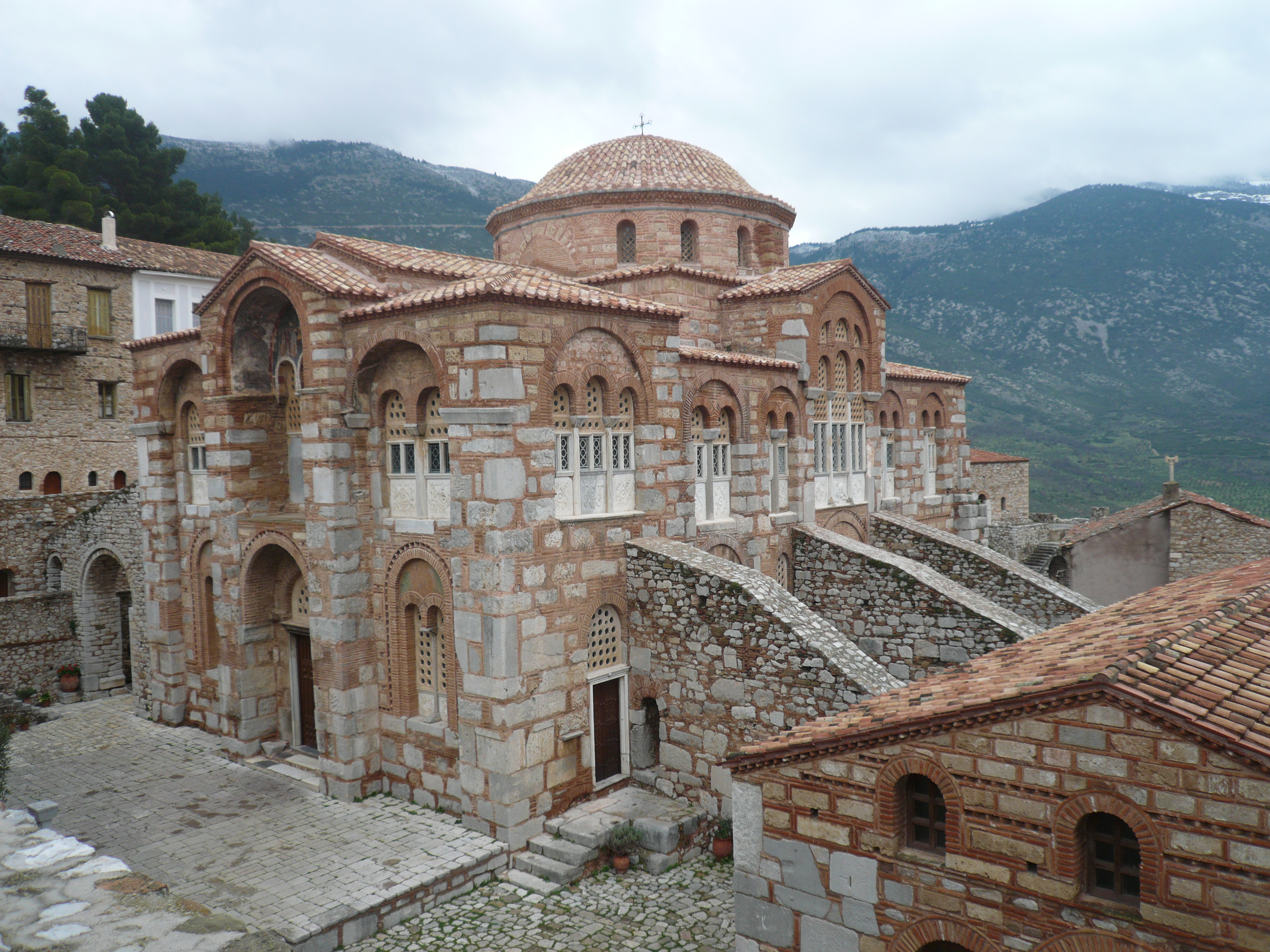
Monastery of Hosios Loukas

- 953 Monastery of Hosios Loukas founded by St. Luke the Younger near Stiris (Thebes) in Greece.
- 957 Olga of Kiev baptized in Constantinople, Equal of the Apostles. (Note: "At Constantinople, after having been instructed in the faith of the Greek Church, and living in fasting, prayer, and almsgiving, she, together with her retinue, was baptized by the Patriarch Polyeuktes, the Patriarch dismissing her with his blessing: "Blessed art thou amongst Russian women; from generation to generation the Russian people shall call thee blessed.")
- 960 Nikephoros Phokas recaptures Crete for the Byzantines.
- 961 Founding of Agia Lavra monastery in Kalavryta, Peloponesse, (the symbolic birthplace of modern Greece in 1821).
- 963 Athanasius of Athos establishes first major monastery on Mount Athos, the Great Lavra; (Note: The project was financed by spoils from the Cretan campaign (961) and donations by the Emperor Nikephoros Phocas.) founding of Philosophou Monastery in Dimitsana, Peloponnese (Metropolis of Gortyna and Megalopolis); death of Michael Maleinos, the spiritual father of Athanasius of Athos and a Byzantine monk who commanded great respect among the Christians of Asia Minor, later adopted as a patron saint of Mikhail Feodorovich, the first Romanov tsar.
- c. 963–1018 The Chronicle of Monemvasia is composed, narrating the events that depict the Avaro-Slavic conquest and colonization of mainland Greece, covering a period from 587 to 805.
- 965 Emperor Nikephoros II Phokas regains Cyprus completely for the Byzantines.
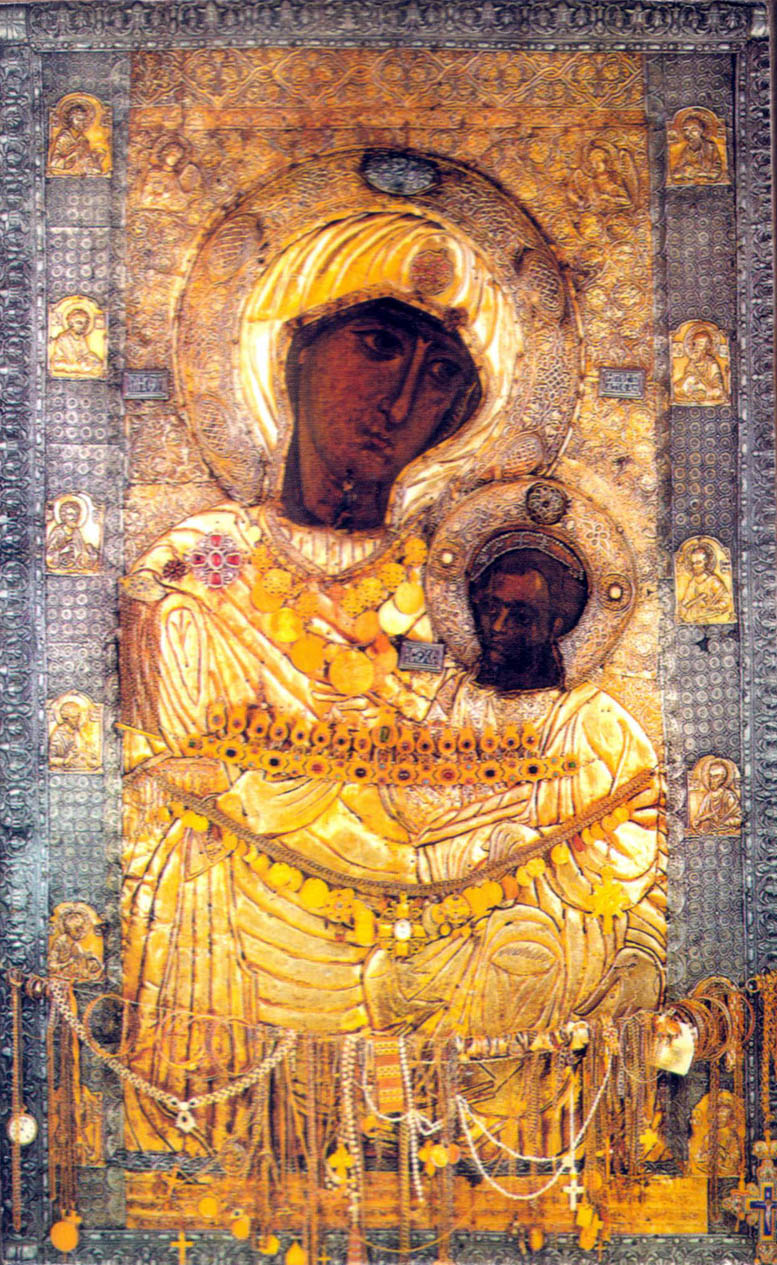
  Panagia Portaitissa, Our Lady of Iveron, Mount Athos, Greece
- 968–71 Fifth Rus'-Byzantine War, resulting in a Byzantine victory over the coalition of Rus', Pechenegs, Magyars, and Bulgarians in the Battle of Arcadiopolis, and the defeat of Sviatoslav of Kiev by John I Tzimiskes.
- 969 Emperor Nikephoros II Phokas captures Antioch and Aleppo from Arabs. (Note: "Nicephorus Phocas, established government by military aristocracy in the Byzantine Empire. With one longish interval, it was to last till the Latin conquest. This tenth-century Pattakos had only one passion, fighting on the battlefield, and his only spiritual need was prayer and conversation with holy men. He was one of the patrons of Athonite monasticism. He also established finally that the Patriarch of Constantinople should be elected by the Holy Synod. A short-list of three names was to be submitted to the Emperor, who selected from it the Aristos.")
- 972 Emperor John I Tzimiskes grants Mount Athos its first charter (Typikon). (Note: Known as the "Tragus", it officially established the coenobian system alongside the hermitages.)
- 975 Emperor John I Tzimiskes in a Syrian campaign takes Emesa, Baalbek, Damascus, Tiberias, Nazareth, Caesarea, Sidon, Beirut, Byblos, and Tripoli, but fails to take Jerusalem.
- 980 Revelation of the Axion Estin (the hymn "It Is Truly Meet"), with the appearance of the Archangel Gabriel to a monk on Mount Athos.

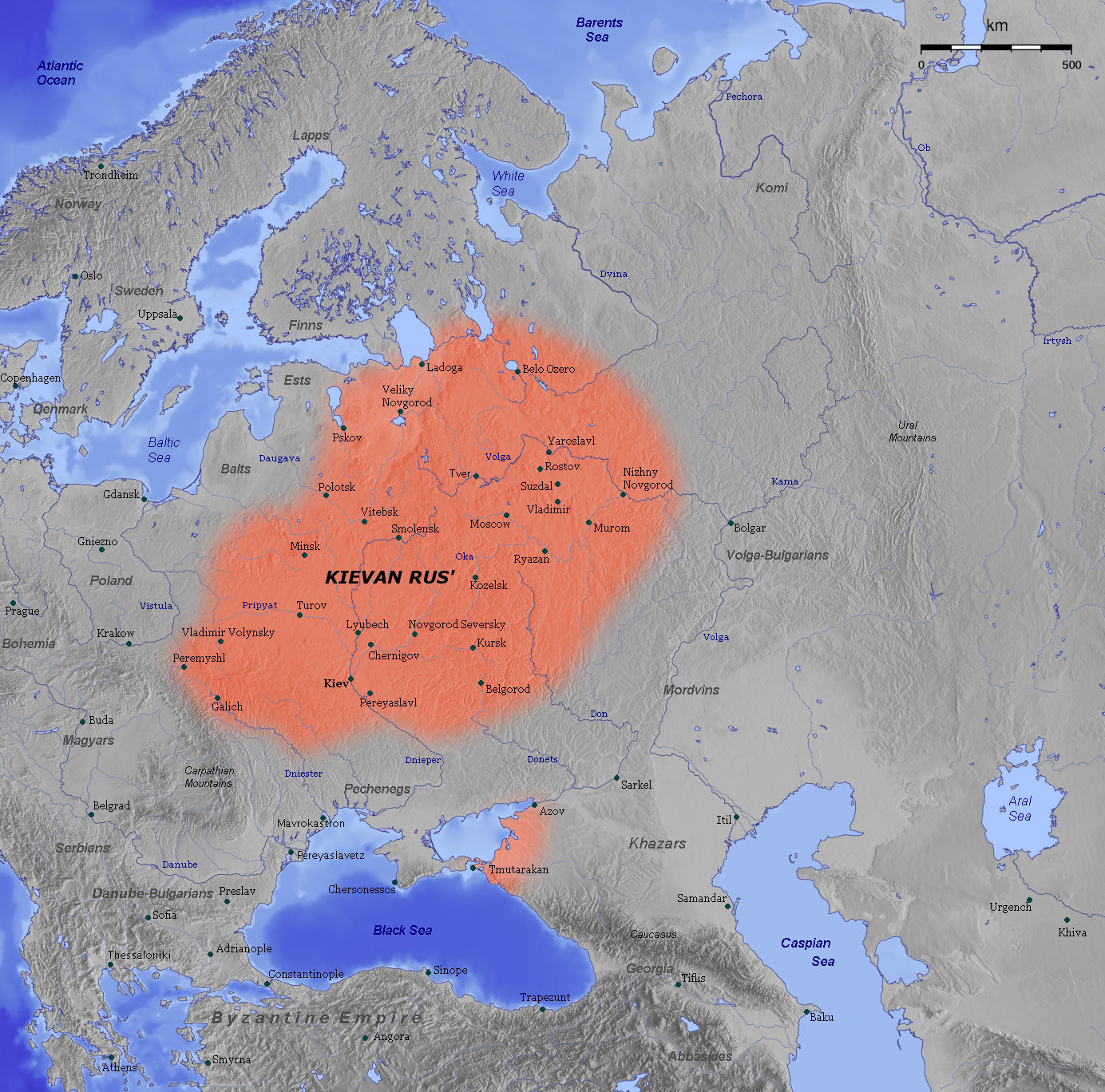
Kievan Rus' in the late 10th century

- c. 980–983 Iviron Monastery is built under the supervision of Ioannes the Iberian and Tornikios.
- c. 985–990 – Foundation of the Latin Benedictine Monastery of St. Mary on Mount Athos (St. Mary of the Amalfitans, or Amalfion), founded by Leo the Roman, brother of the Duke of Benevento, along with six disciples and the assistance of the Georgians of the Great Lavra, lasting until 1287. (Note: "Amalfi, on the south-west coast of Italy, was an independent state outside the territory of the Byzantine empire (though until 839 it has belonged to the Byzantine duchy of Naples)...The Amalfitan monastery was ranked in fifth place in the hierarchy in the eleventh century. The fact that it endured for more than 300 years, surviving not only the exchange of anathemas in 1054…but also the Latin empire of 1204-61, is a tribute to the truly ecumenical nature of Athonite monasticism at the time. The house was eventually absorbed by the Lavra in 1287, but its tall lonely tower, which still stands on a wooded eminence above the bay of Morphonou, is a forlorn reminder of this once great Latin monastery.")
- 987 Sixth Rus'–Byzantine War, where Vladimir of Kiev dispatches troops to the Byzantine Empire to assist Emperor Basil II with an internal revolt, agreeing to accept Orthodox Christianity as his religion and bring his people to the new faith.
- 988 Baptism of Rus' begins with the conversion of Vladimir of Kiev who is baptized at Chersonesos, the birthplace of the Russian and Ukrainian Orthodox churches; (Note: "From Kiev, Christianity spread into the provinces. After his conversion, Vladimir's character was completely changed. Like Oswald with the holy Aidan (a sight which the Venerable Bede describes as "beautiful"), he accompanied the Bishops in their missionary work throughout the country; schools were established and organized, with Greek teachers from Constantinople set over them, Greek and Latin taught, and the principles of the Orthodox Church inculcated. Vladimir built several Churches, for which he employed Greek architects; he built of stone the cathedral Church of Kiev, endowing it with the tenth part of all his revenues, and dedicating it, doubtless after the Church of his conversion at Cherson, to the Most Holy Virgin; and appointed Michael the Syrian Bishop of Kiev. Michael founded Churches in Rostov and Novgorod, but died before the completion of the Cathedral of Kiev. He was succeeded by Leontius, a Greek by birth, sent over by the Patriarch of Constantinople; by Leontius the Cathedral was consecrated, and the Sees of Novgorod, Rostov, Chernigov, and Belgorod established. The third Bishop was Ivan (or John). Thus the Russian Church was firmly established.") Vladimir marries Anna Porphyrogenita, sister of Byzantine emperor Basil II.
- c. 990 Bp. Œcumenius of Trikka (now Trikkala) in Thessaly writes several commentaries on books of the New Testament.
- 998 Death of Nikon the Metanoeite ("preacher of repentance").
- c. 999–1004 Icon of the Panagia Portaitissa appears on Mount Athos near Iviron monastery. (Note: According to the Orthodox Church's Sacred Tradition, the Wonderworking icon of the Panagia Portaitissa was at one time in the possession of a widow in Nicea. Not wanting the icon to be seized and destroyed by the iconoclasts, she spent all night in prayer and then cast the icon into the Mediterranean Sea; this took place during the reign of Emperor Theophilus (829–842). Much later (c. 999 or c. 1004), the icon was recovered from the sea by a Georgian monk named Gabriel (St. Gabriel of Iveron, 13 May) who was laboring at the Iveron Monastery on Mount Athos, and it was then taken to the katholikon (main church) of the monastery from which it gets its name. For about 170 years since it was cast into the sea (c. 829 – c. 999) no one knew the whereabouts of this icon.)
- 10th-century Paris Psalter produced, a Byzantine illuminated manuscript containing 449 folios and 14 full-page miniatures "in a grand, almost classical style", considered a key monument of the so-called Macedonian Renaissance in Byzantine art; Wonderworking icon of the Archangel Michael of Mantamados is created as a relief icon, moulded from clay and the blood of the martyred monks of the Monastery of the Taxiarhes (Archanagels) of Mantamado; death Theodora of Vastas (Arcadia).

The Byzantine Empire under Basil II – c. 1025

- 1004 St. Nilus the Younger, born to a Greek family in the Byzantine Theme of Calabria, founds the famous Greek Basilian monastery of Grottaferrata, becoming the first abbott.
- 1009 Patr. Sergius II of Constantinople removes name of Pope Sergius IV from the diptychs of Constantinople because the pope had written a letter to the patriarch including the Filioque. (Note: "From 1009, the Franks controlled the succession to the papal throne and Latin orthodoxy dropped its resistance to the innovations devised at the court of Charlemagne, making it official doctrine.")
- 1018 Emperor Basil II went on a pilgrimage to Athens directly after his final victory over the Bulgarians for the sole purpose of worshipping at the Parthenon.

The Byzantine Empire and its themata in 1045. At this point, the empire was the most powerful state in the Mediterranean.

- 1027 Byzantine-Fatimid treaty is concluded in 1027 between Constantine VIII and Ali az-Zahir allowing for the rebuilding of the Church of the Resurrection, permitting the emperor to select the Patriarch of Jerusalem, and to ensure that those who had unwillingly converted to Islam under al-Hakim could return to Christianity, thus the Byzantine emperors became protectors of the Christians. (Note: "It would appear that Byzantine-Fatimid relations from 1027 through the reign of Romanos IV Diogenes (1068-71) were generally cordial.")
- 1034 Patriarch Alexius I Studites writes the first complete Studite Typikon, for a monastery he established near Constantinople; this was the Typikon introduced into the Rus' lands by Theodosius of the Kiev Caves.
- 1036 The treaty of 1027 between Byzantium and the caliphs was renewed in 1036, restoring to the Christians all their property and privileges, and permitting work on the restoration of the Church of the Resurrection by Byzantine masons; the Varangian Guard of the Byzantine Emperor is sent to the Holy Land to protect pilgrims.
- 1038 Byzantine general George Maniakes partially reconquered the city of Syracuse in Sicily, sending the relics of St. Lucy of Syracuse to Constantinople.

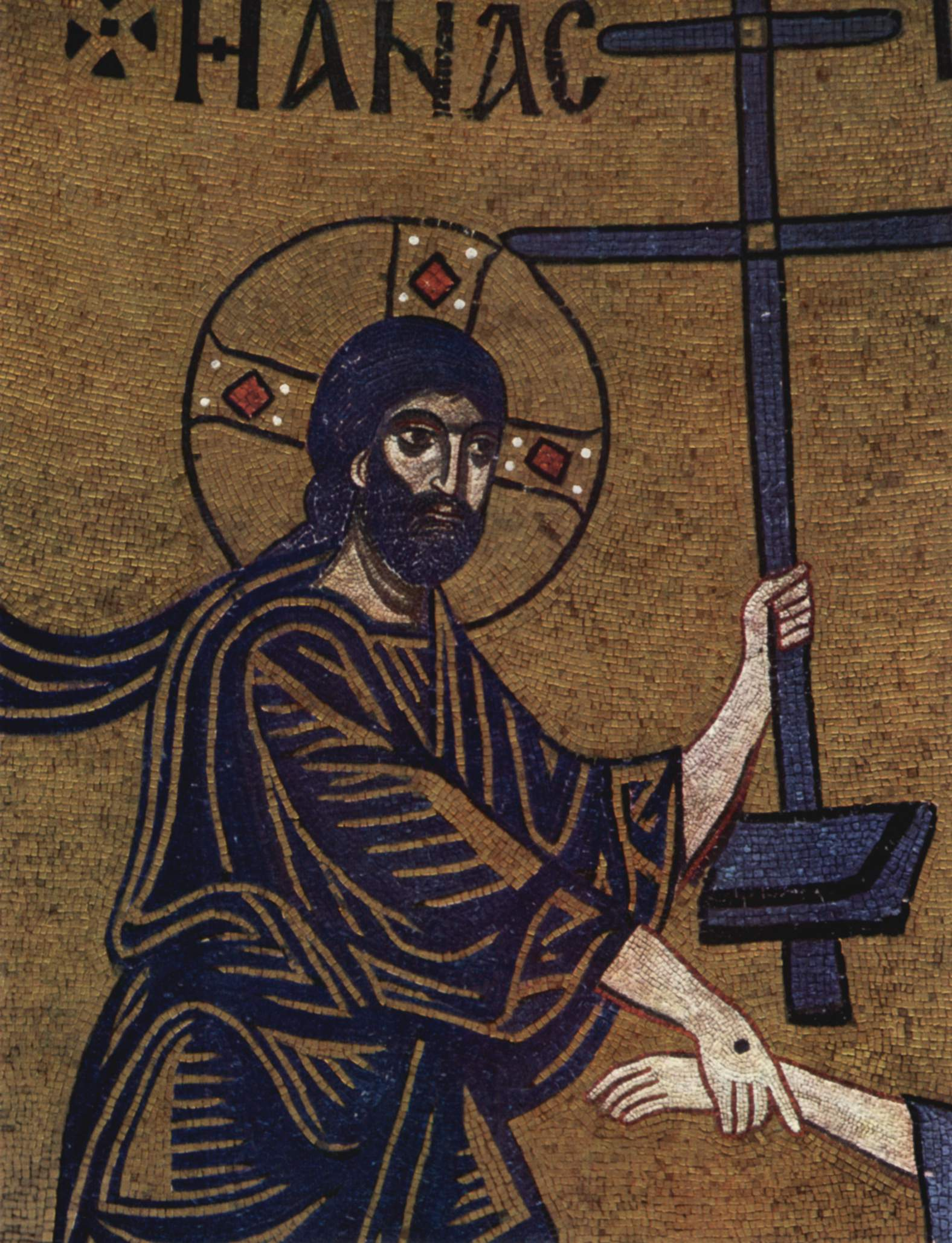
Anastasis, Nea Moni of Chios, Greece, 11th century

- 1042 Founding of Nea Moni Monastery on Chios.
- 1043 University of Constantinople is re-organized under Michael Psellos.
- 1045 Emperor Constantine IX Monomachos signs the second Typikon of Mount Athos, in which Athos is officially termed The Holy Mountain; there are three large coenobia: the Great Lavra, Iviron and Vatopedion.
- 1048 The Church of the Resurrection was rebuilt and re-consecrated in 1048, when Constantine IX Monomachos was Emperor and Nicephorus I the Patriarch of Jerusalem; a confraternity was established in Thebes which was devoted to an icon of the Holy Virgin kept in a convent in Naupaktos (Virgin of Nafpaktos / Panagia Nafpaktiotissa). (Note: "Every month, the icon was taken out in a procession to another church in the confraternity. Many participants were members of aristocratic families owning land in the environs of Thebes." Currently, the feast of the "Virgin of Nafpaktos" is observed in Nafpaktos on 7 October each year, in memory of the Battle of Lepanto which took place on 7 October 1571, where the Christian European fleet decisively defeated the fleet of the Ottoman Empire.: See: (in Greek) Παναγία Ναυπακτιώτισσα. Βικιπαίδεια. (Greek Wikipedia).)
- 1053 Death of Lazarus the Wonder-worker of Mt. Galesius near Ephesus. Patriarch Michael I Cerularius abruptly closes all Latin rite churches in Constantinople, eliciting protests from Pope St. Leo IX.
- 1054 The Great Schism between Orthodox East and Latin West: excommunication of Patriarch Michael I Cerularius by Cardinal Humbertus, papal legate, while Michael returns the favor by excommunicating Pope St. Leo IX.
- 1059 The Treaty of Melfi marked the recognition of the Norman power in South Italy, as Pope Nicholas II, a Cluniac monk, invested Robert Guiscard as duke of Apulia, Calabria, and Sicily. (Note: "The desire to reform and restructure the church in southern Italy, already apparent under Leo IX, and to recover the disciplinary rights of the papacy over churches which the Byzantines had kept subject to the patriarch of Constantinople, both required the assistance of the de facto ruling authorities.")
- 1060–1091 Norman Conquest of Sicily, instrumental in bringing Latin Christianity to an area which historically followed the Greek Byzantine rite. (Note: From the fall of Reggio Calabria (capital of the tagma of Calabria) in 1060 to Robert Guiscard, to the fall of Messina one year later in 1061 under the leadership of Roger I of Sicily, to the fall of Noto in 1091 in the southern tip of Sicily, the Normans conquered all of Sicily. They were also gradually seizing the Southern Italian mainland too, taking Otranto in October 1068, and Bari itself in April 1071, forming what was afterwards called the Kingdom of the Two Sicilies. The last Imperial city to fall was Naples in 1138. From this time on, the Roman Pope had jurisdiction in these parts, although the Byzantine rite lingered on in Magna Graecia.)
- 1068 Arrival of the first Seljuk Turks to Anatolia, by which time the religious war between Byzantium and Islam had already run a course of four centuries.
- 1071 Seljuk Turks defeat Byzantines at the Battle of Manzikert, beginning Islamization of Asia Minor; (Note: "Anna Comnena remarks that by the end of the eleventh century a large proportion of the towns along the Aegean coastline from the north to Attalia had been completely or partially destroyed. When the Second Crusaders passed through western Asia Minor, Odo of Deuil remarked that, though the Greeks had rebuilt and recolonized some of the urban centers, many of the towns were still nothing more than uninhabited ruins. Adramyttium, formerly very populous and prosperous, was so destroyed, a contemporary relates, that one could not tell whether it had ever been inhabited by man. Dorylaeum, one of the largest and most prosperous of Greek towns in Asia Minor, lay a deserted ruin for over one hundred years, no one stone standing upon another in the ruins. Caesareia remained an uninhabited shambles for over half a century, not being rebuilt until the mid-twelfth century. These are merely three cases from a long list of sacked or destroyed Byzantine towns in the first century of the Seljuk-Byzantine conflict. In this early period the sources reveal that over seventy-five towns and villages were subjected, to severe devastation, some of them being sacked on more than one occasion, and twenty-seven of these towns were destroyed and became uninhabited for varying periods.") Norman princes led by Robert Guiscard capture Bari, the last Byzantine stronghold in Italy, bringing to an end over five centuries of Byzantine rule in the south.
- c. 1071–1176 Byzantine epic poem Digenes Akritas is written, set in the 9th and 10th centuries, inspired by the almost continuous state of warfare with the Arabs in eastern Asia Minor, presenting a comprehensive picture of the intense frontier life of the Akrites, the border guards of the Byzantine Empire. (Note: "Based on a historical character who died about 788, the epic, a blend of Greek, Byzantine, and Oriental motifs, originated in the 10th century and was popularized by itinerant folksingers; it was recorded in several versions from the 12th to the 17th centuries, the oldest being a linguistic mixture of popular and literary language.")
- 1073 Seljuk Turks conquer Ankara.
- 1077 Seljuks capture Nicaea.
- 1087 Translation of the relics of Nicholas of Myra from Myra to Bari.
- 1082 Council of Blachernae condemned Neoplatonic philosopher John Italus. (Note: The council pronounced that Hellenic studies formed a valuable part of education but anathematized anyone who held Hellenic doctrines. For a man to call himself a Hellene was as if he denied to be a Christian.)
- 1083 Metropolis of Paronaxia separates from the Metropolis of Rhodes.
- 1088 Emperor Alexios I Komnenos gave the island of Patmos to Blessed Christodoulos of Patmos to develop as an independent monastic state, with Blessed Christodoulos founding the Monastery of Saint John the Theologian on Patmos (1088–1093).
- 1093 Death of Christodoulos the Wonderworker of Patmos.
- 1098 Martyrdom of great-martyr Theodore Gabras, virtual Byzantine governor of Trebizond, in Theodosiopolis by the Danishmend Turks under Amir Ali (Amiralis); (Note: "His captor tried, without success, to force the conversion of Gabras. Gabras was first layed out on the snow, face down, and beaten on the back. He remained steadfast, however, so his captors then proceeded to dismember him alive, severing his tongue, plucking out his eyes, and then removing his scalp, limbs, and other parts. His remains were burned and the Amir Ali had a golden drinking cup fashioned from his skull.") Pope Urban II called the Council of Bari, (Note: Bari, the last town in Apulia which had been left to the Greeks, was captured A.D. 1071, by Robert Guiscard, whom Pope Nicolas II., and after him Gregory VII., bound by an oath of allegiance to the Roman Church.) attended by more than 180 Roman Catholic bishops, including noted theologian Anselm of Canterbury (the founder of scholasticism) who defended the filioque clause, with the result that the Roman Catholic-dominated council affirmed the filoque and anathematized those who were opposed to it.
- 11th century Kaisariani Monastery is founded on the slopes of Mount Hymettos, one of the oldest and most important monasteries in Attica; foundation of Kykkos Monastery in Cyprus under the patronage of Byzantine Emperor Alexios I Komnenos, one of the three largest and most historic sacred monasteries of Cyprus, and one of the five stavropegial monasteries of the Church of Cyprus.
- 1108 Death of Theophylact of Ohrid, among the most prominent of Orthodox theologians of his time, a true son of Byzantium by upbringing and outlook, who became the Archbishop of Achrida (Ohrid) from c. 1090 to 1108, and a true father and archpastor of the Bulgarian Church, leaving comprehensive commentaries on the Gospels and other New Testament texts.
- 1118–1137 Imperial monastery of Christ Pantocrator founded.
- 1127–1145 Constantinople largest city in the world by population.
- 1147 Roger II of Sicily takes Corfu from the Byzantine Empire, and pillages Corinth, Athens and Thebes.
- 1149 Abbot Suger of St. Denis together with Bernard of Clairvaux laid plans for a series of councils which would summon all of France to a new crusade to the Holy Land, including voices such as Peter, Abbot of Cluny who demanded vengeance on the Byzantine Empire over the failure of the Second Crusade, and had correspondence with Roger II of Sicily, calling for an expedition against Constantinople.
- 1170 Council of Constantinople, attended by many Eastern and Western Bishops, on the reunion of the Eastern and Latin Churches, without effect.
- 1176 Sultanate of Rum defeats Byzantine Empire in the Battle of Myriokephalon, marking end of Byzantine attempts to recover Anatolian plateau.

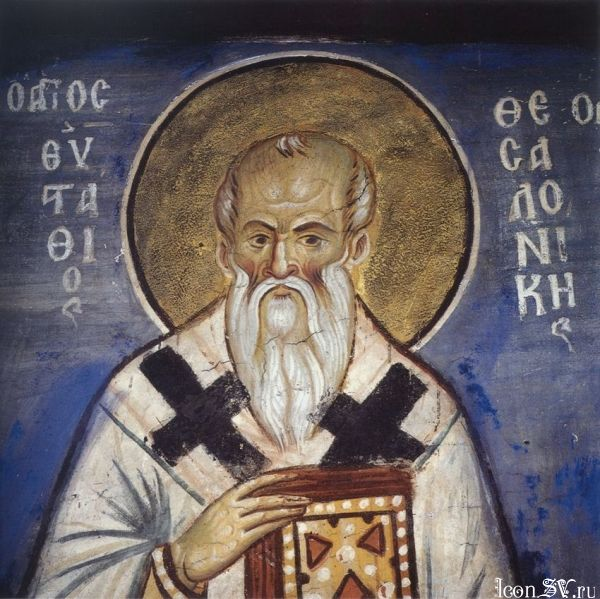
St. Eustathios of Thessaloniki, Archbishop (c. 1175 – c. 1195/6)

- 1179 Pope Alexander III convened the Third Lateran Council, which was attended by a certain Nectarios of the important Basilian Monastery of St. Nicholas of Kasoulon near Otranto, under Norman patronage, who made himself the champion of the Greek Church, and vigorously supported their customs and doctrines.
- 1182 Large-scale massacre of Latin inhabitants of Constantinople, who at that time dominated the city's maritime trade and financial sector, further worsening relations and increasing enmity between the Western and Eastern churches, and resulting in a sequence of hostilities between the two that followed; (Note: Although precise numbers are unavailable, the bulk of the Latin community, estimated at 60,000 at the time by Eustathius of Thessalonica, was wiped out or forced to flee. The Genoese and Pisan communities especially were decimated, and some 4,000 survivors were sold as slaves to the Turkish Sultanate of Rum.) Michael II Choniates is the last Metropolitan of Athens before the Latin conquest (1182–1205, in exile 1205–1222).
- 1183 Dedication of Monreale Cathedral in Sicily (1174–1189, Benedictine), containing the largest cycle of Byzantine mosaics extant in Italy. (Note: "The cathedral (1174–89) is one of the richest and most beautiful churches in Italy, combining Norman, Byzantine, Italian, and Saracen styles. Particularly notable is the interior mosaic decoration, one of the largest in existence. It was created in less than 10 years by a group of craftsmen trained in Byzantium. The subjects of the mosaics include an Old Testament cycle, the miracles of Christ, the life of Christ, and the lives of SS. Peter and Paul.")
- 1185 Norman conquest of Thessaloniki, resulting in a full-scale massacre of the city's inhabitants including some 7,000 victims. (Note: The siege was extensively chronicled by the city's archbishop, Eustathius of Thessalonica, who was present in the city during and after the siege. It came on the heels of the Byzantine massacre of the Latins in Constantinople in 1182.)
- 1188 Emperor Isaac II Angelos agreed to Sultan Saladin's request to build a new mosque (and not just use an existing one) in Constantinople. (Note: Its construction is mentioned by Pope Innocent III in a letter of 1210 to the Latin Patriarch of Constantinople, Tommaso Morosini (Patrologia Latina, CCXVI, col. 354).)
- 1189 The contingent of the Third Crusade led by German king Frederick Barbarossa occupied Philippopolis in Thrace; Frederick Barbarossa wrote to his son Henry VI to send a fleet and attack the capital, also writing to the pope for his blessing, stating that it was necessary to eliminate the Empire if they were going to have any success in their enterprise against the Moslems.

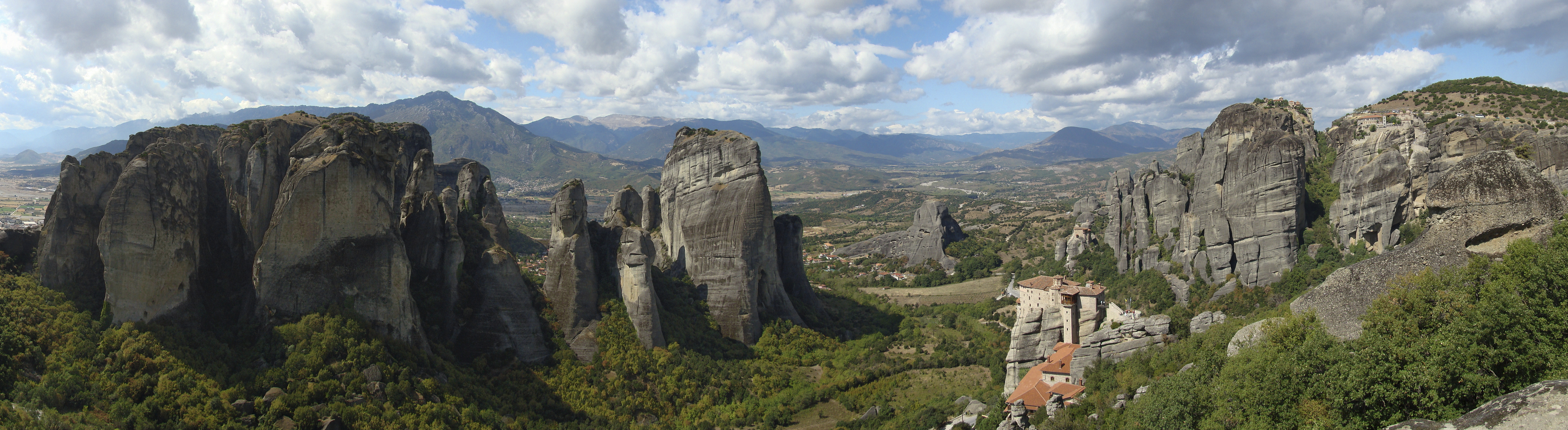
Greek Orthodox monasteries at Meteora, Greece

- 1192–1489 Church of Cyprus is subordinated to the French Lusignans, with a Latin Hierarchy established by the Crusaders.
- 1193 Theodore Balsamon argued on the basis of Canon 7 of the Second Ecumenical Council that Latin baptisms, based on one immersion, ought to be considered as invalid, alleging that their case was similar to that of the Eunomians.
- 12th-century Skete life begins in Meteora; on the eve of the Frankish conquest, the Church of Greece, ecclesiastically under the jurisdiction of the Ecumenical Patriarch, contained twelve (12) metropolitan sees, of which Corinth and Athens were the two most important, while Patras, Larissa, Naupaktos, Neopatras, Thebes, Corfu, Naxos, Lacedaemonia, Argos, and the Cretan see of Gortyna completed the dozen. (Note: "To these should be added Monemvasia, if we may trust the story of the fifteenth century historian Phrantzes, himself a Monemvasiote, accepted by Finlay, that it became a metropolitan see under the Emperor Maurice... ...Besides these, the islands of Leukas, and Aegina, and the towns of Arta were archbishoprics, and each metropolitan see had numerous bishops under it. Such was the arrangement which, with a few alterations, had been in force since the days of Leo the philosopher, three centuries earlier.")

== See also ==
- Eastern Orthodoxy in Greece
- List of archbishops of Athens
- Greek Orthodox Church
- Organization of the Eastern Orthodox Church

History

- History of the Eastern Orthodox Church
- History of Eastern Christianity
- History of the Eastern Orthodox Church under the Ottoman Empire
- History of the Eastern Orthodox Church
- Timeline of Eastern Orthodoxy in North America

Church Fathers

- Apostolic Fathers
- Church Fathers
- Ante-Nicene Fathers (book)
- Desert Fathers
- Nicene and Post-Nicene Fathers
- List of Church Fathers

== Bibliography ==
- Rev. Dr. Andrew Louth. Greek East and Latin West : The Church, AD 681–1071. The Church in History Vol. III. Crestwood, N.Y. : St. Vladimirs Seminary Press, 2007.
- Rev. Dr. Andrew Louth and Dr. Augustine Casiday (Eds.). Byzantine Orthodoxies: Papers from the Thirty-Sixth Spring Symposium of Byzantine Studies, University of Durham, 23–25 March 2002. Society for the Promotion of Byzantine Studies, Volume 12. Ashgate Publishing, Ltd., 2006.
- Anthony Kaldellis. The Byzantine Republic: People and Power in New Rome. Harvard University Press, 2015. 312 pages. ISBN 9780674967403
- Donald Nicol. Church and Society in Byzantium. Cambridge University Press, 2008. ISBN 978-0521071673
- Dimitri Obolensky. The Byzantine Commonwealth: Eastern Europe, 500–1453. New York, NY: Praeger Publishers Inc., 1971. ISBN 1597407356
- (in German) Ferdinand Gregorovius. Geschichte der Stadt Athen im Mittelalter. Von der Zeit Justinians bis zur türkischen Eroberung. Stuttgart, 1889.

- ("History of Athens in the Middle Ages. From Justinian to the Turkish Conquest." 1889.)

- Florin Curta. Southeastern Europe in the Middle Ages, 500-1250. Cambridge University Press, 2006. ISBN 978-0521894524
- John Meyendorff. The Byzantine Legacy in the Orthodox Church. Crestwood, N.Y. : St. Vladimirs Seminary Press, 1982.
- John Meyendorff. Byzantine Theology: Historical Trends and Doctrinal Themes. 2nd ed. Fordham Univ Press, 1979.
- J. M. Hussey. Church & Learning in the Byzantine Empire, 867–1185. Oxford University Press, 1937.
- Milton V. Anastos. Aspects of the Mind of Byzantium: Political Theory, Theology, and Ecclesiastical Relations with the See of Rome. Ashgate Publications, Variorum Collected Studies Series, 2001.
- Milton V. Anastos. "The transfer of Illyricum, Calabria, and Sicily to the jurisdiction of the Patriarchate of Constantinople in 732-33." In: Anastos, Studies in Byzantine Intellectual History. Variorum Collected Studies Series, London, 1979.
- Prof. Anthony Kaldellis. A Heretical (Orthodox) History of the Parthenon. Department of Greek and Latin, The Ohio State University. 01/02/2007. (.pdf)
- Fr. Robert F. Taft (S.J.), Patriarch Athenagoras Orthodox Institute. Through Their Own Eyes: Liturgy as the Byzantines Saw It. InterOrthodox Press, 2006. 172pp.
- Speros Vryonis, (Jr). "Byzantine Attitudes towards Islam during the Late Middle Ages." Greek Roman and Byzantine Studies 12 (1971).
- Steven Runciman. The Byzantine Theocracy. Cambridge University Press, 2004.
- Stephanos Efthymiadis, (Open University of Cyprus, Ed.). The Ashgate Research Companion to Byzantine Hagiography: Volume I: Periods and Places. Ashgate Publishing, Ltd., December 2011. 464 pp. ISBN 978-0-7546-5033-1
- Stephanos Efthymiadis, (Open University of Cyprus, Ed.). The Ashgate Research Companion to Byzantine Hagiography: Volume II: Genres and Contexts. Ashgate Publishing, Ltd., March 2014. 536 pp. ISBN 978-1-4094-0951-9
- Timothy S. Miller. Medieval Byzantine Christianity. Ed. by Derek Krueger. A People's History of Christianity, Vol. 3. Minneapolis, Fortress Press. 2006. pp. 252.
