= Nomos Stratiotikos =

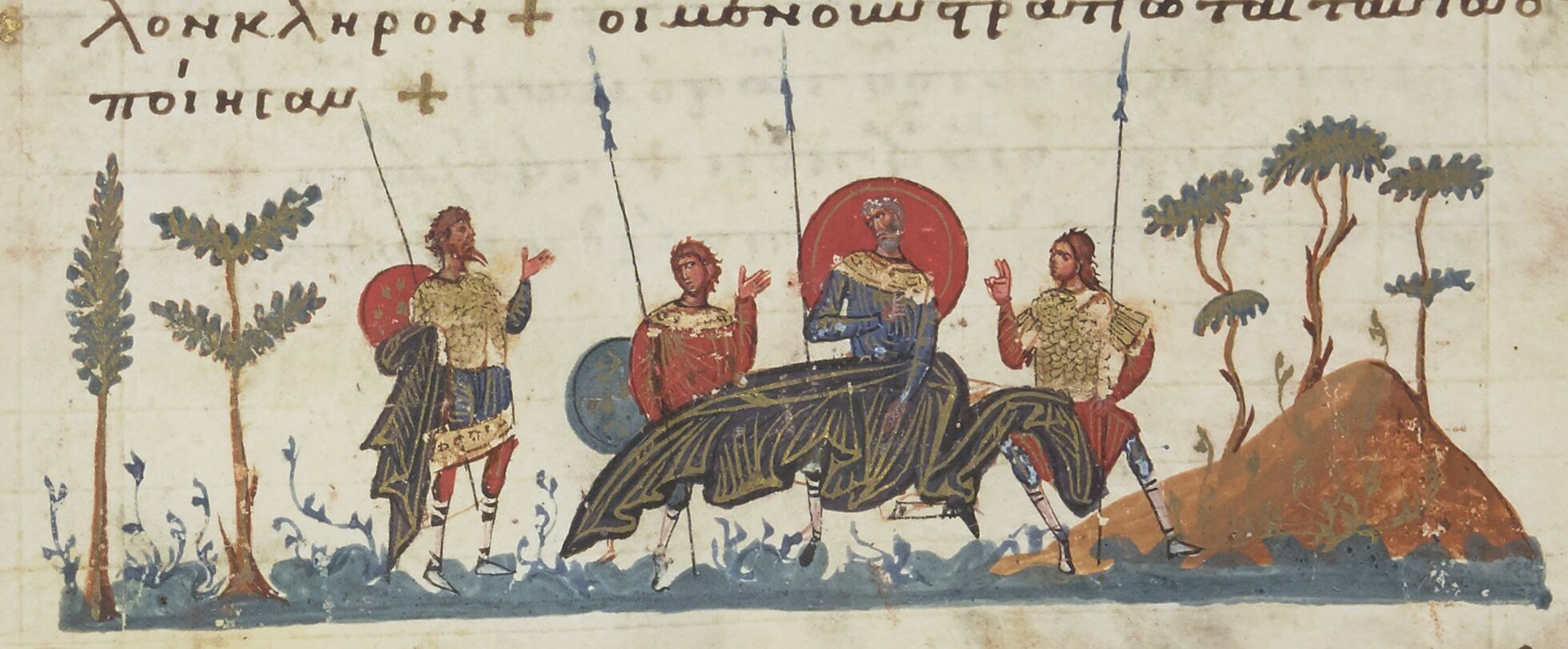
- The code of law focused on the soldiery (illustration from Minuscule 269)
- Original title: Νόμος Στρατιωτικός
- Created: 7th–8th century
- Commissioned by: Heraclian dynasty or Isaurian dynasty
- Subject: Code (Byzantine law)
- Purpose: Constitution for soldiery

The Nomos Stratiotikos (Greek: Νόμος Στρατιωτικός, "Soldier's Law", NS) was a Byzantine military law code compiled in the 7th or 8th century. It consists of about 55 mainly penal and disciplinary regulations for soldiers. Many of its provisions derive from earlier Roman and Byzantine legal and military texts, including the Corpus Juris Civilis and the Strategikon of Maurice.

At the same time as the Soldier's Law, two other code of laws were promulgated, the Nomos Georgikos ("Farmer's Law") for soldiers and the Nomos Rhodion Nautikos ("Rhodian Sea Law") for maritime law. These three are grouped together as leges speciales in scholarship, as they are often grouped together in manuscripts and are taken to stem from the same time, the 7th–8th century. Schmink attributed the legel speciales to Leo VI (r. 886–912) or a contemporary, which Burgmann refuted on the whole, and instead dated NS to no later than the mid-7th century.

Laws on crimes in agrarian setting are treated in four articles.

== Legacy ==
At the end of the 12th century Archbishop of Tarsus Nerses of Lambron translated the Ekloge ton nomon and their addenda, including the Nomos Stratiotikos, which was important for strengthening the role of military in Cilician Armenia.

== See also ==
- Byzantine law
- Ekloge ton nomon
- Epanagoge
- Procheiron
- Nomos Georgikos
- Nomos Rhodion Nautikos

== Sources ==
- Burgmann, Ludwig (2009). "Die Nomoi Stratiotikos, Georgikos und Nautikos". Зборник радова Византолошког института. 46: 53–64.
- Chitwood, Zachary (2017). Byzantine Legal Culture and the Roman Legal Tradition, 867-1056. Cambridge University Press. p. 109. ISBN 978-1-107-18256-1.
- Humphreys, M. T. G. (2015). Law, Power, and Imperial Ideology in the Iconoclast Era, c. 680-850. Oxford University Press. ISBN 978-0-19-870157-6.
- Simonović, Zoran (2012b). "Krivična dela vezana za privredni život Vizantije prema zakonima VII i VIII veka". Ekonomika. 58 (2): 110–120.
