= Byzantine law =

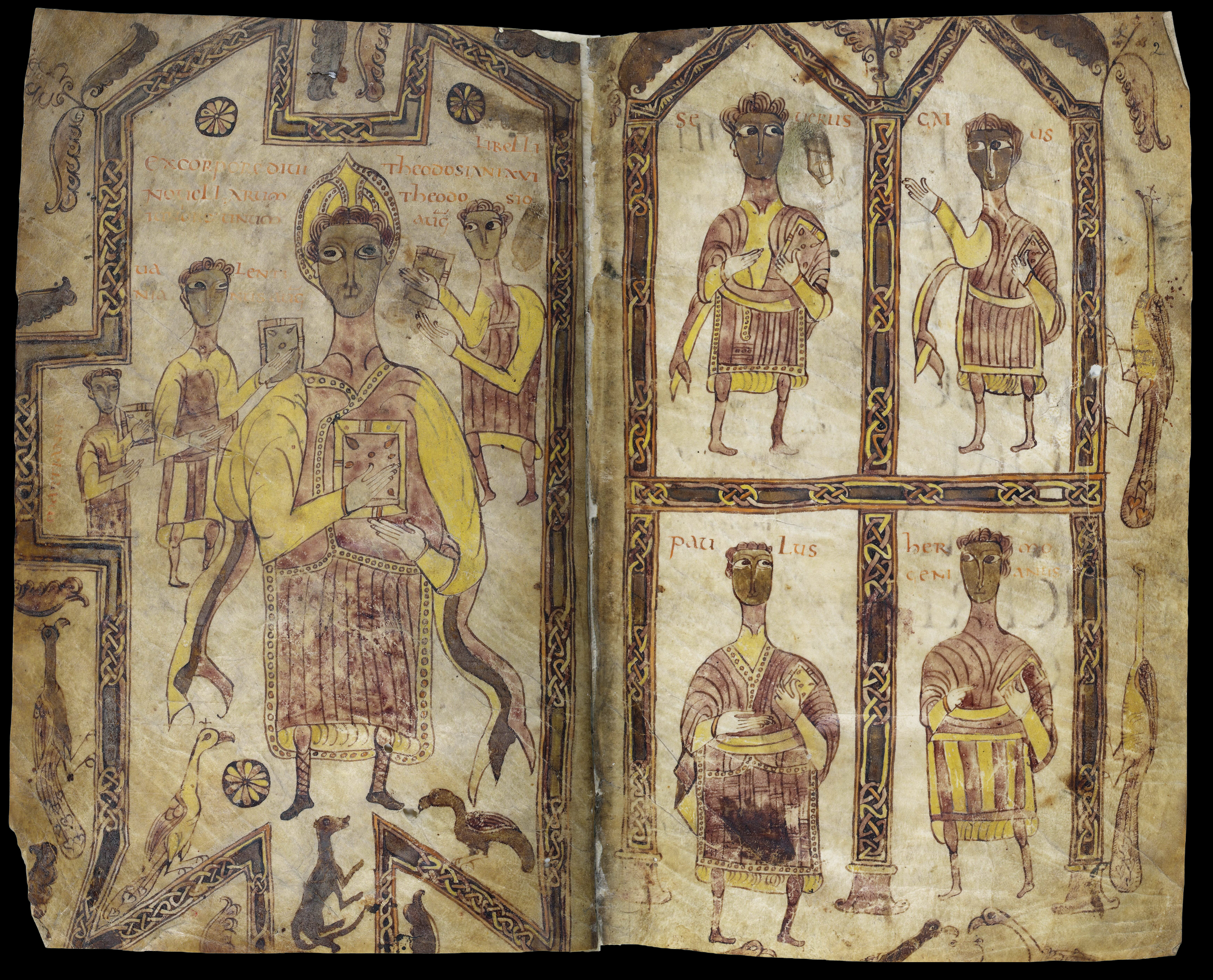
Frontispiece depicting the emperors Theodosius, Valentian, Marcian, and Majorian on the left and Libius Severus on the right. Also on the right are three earlier jurists: Gaius, Paulus, and Modestinus. From a 9th-century manuscript of the Breviary of Alaric.

Byzantine law was essentially a continuation of Roman law with increased Orthodox Christian and Hellenistic influence. Most sources define Byzantine law as the Roman legal traditions starting after the reign of Justinian I in the 6th century and ending with the Fall of Constantinople in the 15th century. Although future Byzantine codes and constitutions derived largely from Justinian's Corpus Juris Civilis, their main objectives were idealistic and ceremonial rather than practical. Following Hellenistic and Near-Eastern political systems, legislations were tools to idealize and display the sacred role and responsibility of the emperor as the holy monarch chosen by God and the incarnation of law "nómos émpsychos", thus having philosophical and religious purposes that idealized perfect Byzantine kingship.

Though during and after the European Renaissance Western legal practices were heavily influenced by Justinian's Code (the Corpus Juris Civilis) and Roman law during classical times, Byzantine law nevertheless had substantial influence on Western traditions during the Middle Ages and after.

The most important work of Byzantine law was the Ecloga, issued by Leo III, the first major Roman-Byzantine legal code issued in Greek rather than Latin. Soon after the Farmer's Law was established regulating legal standards outside the cities. While the Ecloga was influential throughout the Mediterranean (and Europe) because of the importance of Constantinople as a trading center, the Farmer's Law was a seminal influence on Slavic legal traditions including those of Russia.

== Influences and sources ==
Byzantium inherited most of its political institutions from the late Roman period. Similarly, Roman law constituted one of the basis for the Byzantine legal system. For many centuries, the two great codifications carried out by Theodosius II and Justinian respectively, were the cornerstones of Byzantine legislation. Of course, over the years these Roman codes were adjusted to the current circumstances and then replaced by new codifications, written in Greek. However, the influence of Roman law persisted, and it is obvious in codifications, such as Basilika, which was based on Corpus Juris Civilis. In the 11th century, Michael Psellos prides himself for being acquainted with the Roman legal legacy ("Ἰταλῶν σοφία").

Although Byzantine law structure had largely a Roman constitutional body, the main difference of Byzantine law from its Roman counterpart was both in its application and interpretation which were subject and applied under different Hellenistic and Orthodox principles shared between the Byzantine academic currículum, developing a legal system that encouraged different interpretations of law according to philanthropy and evergetia rather than the application of justice itself, acting for the well-being and benefit of the population rather than for the correct structuring of society.

The various philanthropics values of different classical philosophies intermixed with jurisprudence were already a fixed custom in the different code books and constitutions of the Ancient Hellenistic and Near-eastern kingdoms which practiced jurisprudence like a branch of literature and philosophy rather than a science of its own as pioneered by the Roman approach. Said customs and constitutions instituted greater influence at Christianity's arrival, being included in Justinian's novels which dictated that the law should be interpreted on the basis of philanthropy and piety as the emperors of the Macedonian dynasty had acted against the constant abuses and evasions of the dynatoi by imposing the allelengyon or through the different establishment of humanitarian and monastic institutions across the empire.

By the time the Ecloga and the Basilika were being codified, a further increase in Hellenistic and Christian values were also put into practice, all death penalties were replaced with amputations and severe economic sanctions while making further clarifications and references to the different Orthodox and Hellenistic concepts like that the judge should not only be the law incarnate, but also had to interpret it on the basis of "philanthrōpía" and "evergetikós". Thus, verdicts were applied being directly influenced by the different values, ethics and philosophies of their Orthodox social environment and not by the legal provisions of the code books, resulting in the misapplication and misinterpretation of a theoretically and strictly non-malleable Roman law.

In the absence of capable and efficient legal systems and the eclectic Byzantine approach to jurisprudence, most judges and legal processes across the empire were carried through simplified and vernacular laws such as The Farmers' Law, The Sea Laws, The Military Laws or the lesser known Mosaic Law, the different Orthodox and Hellenistic values or orally through the efficient and persuasive use of rhetoric rather than the legal provisions themselves, without Roman law seeing any proper fully systematized or continuing application whatsoever.

In accordance with the Orthodox-Hellenistic concepts of Kingship, the main source of law in Byzantium remained the enactments of the emperor since he himself was the law (nómos émpsychos). The latter initiated some major codifications of the Roman law, but they also issued their own "new laws", the Novels ("Novellae", "Νεαραὶ"). In the late Roman era the legislative interest of the emperors intensified, and laws were now regulating the main aspects of public, private, economic and social life. For example, Constantine I was the first to regulate divorce and Theodosius I intervened in faith issues, imposing a specific version of the Creed. From Diocletian to Theodosius I, namely during approximately 100 years, more than 2,000 laws were issued. Justinian alone promulgated approximately 600 laws. Gradually, the legislative enthusiasm receded, but still some of the laws of later emperors, such as Leo VI's Novels, are of particular importance. The custom continued to play a limited role as a secondary source of law, but written legislation had a precedence.

== Early Byzantine period ==
There is no definitively established date for when the Byzantine period of Roman history begins. During the 4th, 5th, and 6th centuries the Empire was split and united administratively more than once. But it was during this period that Constantinople was first established and the East gained its own identity administratively; thus, it is often considered the early Byzantine period. These developments, nevertheless, were key steps in the formation of Byzantine Law.

=== Codex Theodosianus ===
In 438, Emperor Theodosius published the Codex Theodosianus, which consisted of 16 books, containing all standing laws from the age of Constantine I until then.

=== Corpus Juris Civilis ===
Soon after his accession in 527, Justinian appointed a commission to collect and codify existing Roman law. A second commission, headed by the jurist Tribonian, was appointed in 530 to select matter of permanent value from the works of the jurists, to edit it and to arrange it into 50 books. In 533 this commission produced the Digesta.

Although Law as practiced in Rome had grown up as a type of case law, this was not the "Roman Law" known to the Medieval, or modern world. Now Roman law claims to be based on abstract principles of justice that were made into actual rules of law by legislative authority of the emperor or the Roman people. These ideas were transmitted to the Middle Ages in the great codification of Roman law carried throughout by the emperor Justinian. The Corpus Iuris Civilis was issued in Latin in three parts: the Institutes, the Digest (Pandects), and the Code (Codex). It was the last major legal document written in Latin.

The world's most widespread legal system, civil law, is based on the Corpus (in, for instance, most of Europe, Asia, South America, and Africa, as well as in the mixed jurisdictions of South Africa, Scotland, Quebec, the Philippines and Louisiana).

=== Greek works ===
Following Justinian's reign the Empire entered a period of rapid decline partially enabling the Arab conquests which would further weaken the Empire. Knowledge of Latin, which had been in decline since the fall of the West, virtually disappeared, making many of the old legal codices almost inaccessible. These developments contributed to a dramatic weakening of legal standards in the Empire and a substantial drop in the standards of legal scholarship. Legal practice would become much more pragmatic and, as knowledge of Latin in the Empire waned, direct use of Justinian's "Corpus Juris Civilis" would be abandoned in favor of summaries, commentaries, and new compilations written in Greek.

The Nomos Georgikos ("Farmer's Law") was promulgated likely during the reign of emperor Justinian II (r. 685–695 and 705–711), and it focused largely on peasantry and rural villages, and protected farmer property, concerned with property damage, theft, taxation, and included penalties on misdemeanors committed by villagers, and was designed for the growing free peasantry-class, supplemented by the influx of South Slavs. It was a compendium largely based on provisions of basic and practical knowledge inherited through oral tradition and of a casuistic nature. At the same time as the Farmer's Law, two other laws were promulgated, the Nomos Stratiotikos ("Soldier's Law") for soldiers and the Nomos Rhodion Nautikos ("Rhodian Sea Law") for maritime law.

The Ekloge ton nomon ("Selection of the Laws") was compiled under Leo III (r. 726–741) and was based on Roman law, but written in Greek, and its main purpose was to be used by the judges. It is a revision of Justinian's Institutes, Digest, Code and Novellae, with Christian principles. In civil law, women's rights and children's rights were improved at the expense of the father. In criminal law, capital punishment was restricted to treason, military desertion, certain homicidies, heresy and slander, and removed death penalty for many previous capital offenses, many punishments replaced with mutilation. Equal punishment regardless of social class was prescribed. As to remove bribery, salaries were provided for officials and judges, with the prohibition of accepting gifts.

==== The Sea Laws ====
Dating problems, similar to the ones of the "Farmer's Law", presents a code of equal character, the "Rhodian Sea Law" (Nomos Rhodion Nautikos). In the Digesta seu Pandectae (533) codification ordered by Justinian I (527–565) of the Eastern Roman Empire, an opinion written by the Roman jurist Paulus in approximately 235 AD at the beginning of the Crisis of the Third Century (235–284) was included about the Lex Rhodia ("Rhodian law") that articulates the general average principle of marine insurance established on the island of Rhodes in approximately 1000 to 800 BC, plausibly by the Phoenicians during the proposed Dorian invasion and emergence of the purported Sea Peoples during the Greek Dark Ages (c. 1100–c. 750 BC) that led to the proliferation of the Doric Greek dialect. It is a collection of maritime law regulations divided into three parts. The first part refers to the ratification of the "Naval Law" by the Roman emperors. The second specifies the participation of the crew in maritime profits and the regulations valid on the ship, while the third and largest refers to maritime law, as for example to the apportionment of responsibility in case of theft or damage to the cargo or the ship. The "Naval Law" was included in the Basilika of Leo VI the Wise as a complement to book 53.

== Ecclesiastical law ==
In accordance with the model of the secular legal associations, the canons of the ecclesiastic councils concerned ecclesiastic issues and regulated the conduct of the clergy, as well as of the secular as concerned matters of belief. The "In Trullo" or "Fifth-Sixth Council", known for its canons, was convened in the years of Justinian II (691–692) and occupied itself exclusively with matters of discipline. The aim of the synod was to cover the gaps left in canon law by the previous Fifth (553) and Sixth Ecumenical Councils.

This collection of canons was divided into four parts:

- The canons ratifying the doctrinal decisions of the first six ecumenical councils along with the teachings of the Fathers of the Church.
- The canons specifying the obligations of the ministrational clergy.
- The canons referring to the monks.
- The canons referring to the secular. The influence of these canons carried on in the future and they were extensively annotated by Balsamon, Zonaras and Aristenos, the three great ecclesiastic jurists of the 12th century.

=== Editions ===
- The Didache, from the 2nd century
- The Apostolic Church-Ordinance, from the 3rd century
- The Apostolic Constitutions, from 375 to 380 AD
- The Canons of the Apostles

There were also other Ancient Church Orders no longer extant in Greek. Later, more-scientific collections emerged, including:

- The Nomocanon of John Scholasticus, from the 6th century
- The Nomocanon in 14 titles of Heraclius, from the 7th century
- The Nomocanon of Photios, from the 9th century
- The Syntagma of Theodore Balsamon and his Scholia to the Nomocanon of Photios, from the 12th century
- The Synopsis Canonum by Alexios Aristenos, from the 12th century

All of these books were compiled later by the Athonite monk Saint Nicodemus the Hagiorite and became the basis of the modern Eastern Orthodox canon law, his Pedalion.

== Later Byzantine law ==
The following legal texts were prepared in the later Byzantine Empire:

- The Ekloge ton nomon included 18 chapters, and was a revision of Roman law, with Christian principles, organized by Leo III the Isaurian of the Isaurian dynasty in 741.
- The Epanagoge/Eisagoge was a replacement of the Ekloge, and was promulgated in 886, compiled under Basil I and Leo VI the Wise of the Macedonian dynasty. It was revised and replaced by the Procheiron in 907.
- The Procheiron included 40 titles, mainly comprising private and penal law, ordered by Leo VI the Wise in 907. Its main purpose was to be used by the judges. Although restoring Justinian's laws and invalidating the Ekloge, it used some laws directly from it.
- The Eisagoge of Photios, which includes novel law, c. 880
- The Basilicae (repurgatio veterum legum) or Basilics of Leo the Philosopher, together with his brother Alexander and Constantine VII, c. 900 or 906–11, which attempts to synthesise 6th century commentaries and glosses on Justinians laws by headings, and remove contradictions. By the 11th century, the Basilics had replaced Justinian's laws as the primary source of Roman law.
- The Synopsis (Basilicorum) maior, an abridgment of the Basilika from the late 9th century
- The Epitome Legum, later known as the Ecloga ad Prochiron mutata, a synthesis of Justinian and the Epanagoge, c. 920–1
- The Epanagoge aucta, a revision of the 9th century Epanagogue from c. 11th century.
- The Prochiron aucta, a revision of the 9th century Prochiron from c. 13th century.
- The Hexabiblos, a 14th-century compilation of the above books made by Constantine Harmenopoulos, a judge in Thessalonica
- The Hexabiblos aucta, a late 14th century revision of Harmenopoulos' work by Ioannes Holobolos

Other jurists (including at least one Emperor) prepared private collections of cases and commentaries, but these did not form the body of law used by jurists at large. It is held that the 113 Novels of Leo the Wise fall into this category.

Lokin argues that while later legal texts tended to rearrange or explain the 6th century work of Justinian, rather than create new law, they did alter the locus of authority for law (legis vigor) from the Emperor to God. In Justinian's work, Mosaïc Law and God's authority support the Emperor, and are consultative, but do not temper his absolute authority. This process has already begun in the Ecloga, which states law is God-given by way of Isaiah 8:20, and is made explicit first in the Prochiron. There was, however, 'legislative creep' over this period, where the redaction of old laws and case law created new laws in effect, although not explicitly cited as such.

== The Law School of Constantinople ==
The best known center for legal teaching in the Byzantine Empire was the Law School of Constantinople. Founded in 425, it was closed in 717 as Constantinople was besieged by the Umayyads, reopening in 866 only. It then probably remained open until the Sack of Constantinople by the Crusaders in 1204.

== Legacy ==
During the early Middle Ages Roman/Byzantine Law played a major role throughout the Mediterranean region and much of Europe because of the economic and military importance of the Empire.

The Syro-Roman Law Book, a Syriac translation of a Greek original from the 5th century, was highly influential in eastern Christian communities after the early Muslim conquests. It was based on Roman case law and imperial statutes from the east of the empire.

After the Islamic conquests of the Eastern Mediterranean, the Islamic caliphates gradually codified their legal systems using Roman/Byzantine law as an important model. It has been suggested in fact that it was the Ecloga’s publication that spurred the first major codification of Islamic imperial law.

Slavic legal traditions, including countries ranging from Bulgaria to Russia, were substantially influenced by the Farmer's Law. To a lesser extent the Ecloga and other Byzantine codices influenced these areas as well. During the 18th and 19th centuries, as Russia increased its contact with the West, Justinian's Code began to be studied thus bringing in this influence.

In Western Europe, following the fall of the Roman Empire, the influence of Roman/Byzantine law became more indirect though always significant during much of the Middle Ages. During the European Renaissance, Western scholars embraced Justinian's Code as a basis for jurisprudence, shunning many of the later legal developments of the Byzantine Empire such as the Ecloga. This was to a great extent affected by the East/West (Roman Catholic vs. Eastern Orthodox) split in the Church. The perception in the West was that Roman law that was recorded in Latin was truly Roman whereas later laws written in Greek was distinct and foreign.

== See also ==
- Roman Law
- International Roman Law Moot Court

== Sources ==
- Cameron, Averil (2009). The Byzantines (in Greek). Translated by Giorgos Tzimas. Athens: Editions Psychogios. ISBN 978-960-453-529-3.
- Chitwood, Zachary (2017). Byzantine Legal Culture and the Roman Legal Tradition, 867–1056. Cambridge: Cambridge University Press.
- Fine, John V. A. Jr. (1991) [1983]. The Early Medieval Balkans: A Critical Survey from the Sixth to the Late Twelfth Century. Ann Arbor: University of Michigan Press. ISBN 0-472-08149-7.
- Fögen, Marie Theres (1994). "Legislation in Byzantium: A Political and a Bureaucratic Technique". In Laiou, Angeliki E. (ed.). Law and Society in Byzantium. Dumbarton Oaks. ISBN 0-88402-222-6.
- Humphreys, M. T. G. (2015). Law, Power, and Imperial Ideology in the Iconoclast Era, c. 680–850. Oxford: Oxford University Press.
- Jokisch, Benjamin (2007). Islamic Imperial Law: Harun-Al-Rashid's Codification Project. Walter de Gruyter GmbH. ISBN 9783110924343.
- Morris, Rosemary (1992). "Dispute Settlement in the Byzantine Provinces in the Tenth Century". In Davies, Wendy; Fouracre, Paul (eds.). The Settlement of Disputes in Early Medieval Europe. Cambridge University Press. ISBN 0-521-42895-5.
- Mousourakis, George (2003). The Historical and Institutional Context of Roman Law. Ashgate Publishing. ISBN 0-7546-2108-1.
- Penna, Dafni; Meijering, Roos (2022). A sourcebook on byzantine law: illustrating byzantine law through the sources. Leiden Boston: Brill. ISBN 9789004514706.
- Stolte, Bernard (2018). “Byzantine Law: The Law of the New Rome”, in The Oxford Handbook of European Legal History, eds. Heikki Pihlajamäki, Markus D. Dubber, & Mark Godfrey. Oxford: Oxford University Press. pp. 229–248.
- Šarkić, Srđan (2023). "The Influence of Byzantine Law in East Central Europe". Lectures on East Central European Legal History (2 ed.). CEA: 43–71.
- Troianos, Spyros (2012). "Byzantine Canon Law to 1100". In Wilfried Hartmann; Kenneth Pennington (eds.). The History of Byzantine and Eastern Canon Law to 1500. Washington, DC: The Catholic University of America Press. pp. 115–169. ISBN 9780813216799.
- Troianos, Spyros (2012). "Byzantine Canon Law from the Twelfth to the Fifteenth Centuries". In Wilfried Hartmann; Kenneth Pennington (eds.). The History of Byzantine and Eastern Canon Law to 1500. Washington, DC: The Catholic University of America Press. pp. 170–213. ISBN 9780813216799.
- Wagschal, David (2015). Law and Legality in the Greek East: The Byzantine Canonical Tradition, 381–883. Oxford: Oxford University Press.

Translations

- The Codex of Justinian: A New Annotated Translation, with Parallel Latin and Greek Text. Annotated and translated by Fred H. Blume. Edited by Bruce W. Frier. Cambridge: Cambridge University Press, 2016.
- The Digest of Justinian, revised edn. Edited by Alan Watson. 2 vols. Philadelphia: University of Pennsylvania Press, 1998.
- The Novels of Justinian: A Complete Annotated English Translation. Translated by David Miller. Edited by Peter Sarris. Cambridge: Cambridge University Press, 2018.
- The Syro-Roman Lawbook: The Syriac text of the recently discovered manuscripts accompanied by a facsimile edition and furnished with an introduction and translation. Edited and translated by Arthur Võõbus. 2 vols. Stockholm: ETSE, 1982–3.
- Ecloga: das Gesetzbuch Leons III. und Konstantinos’ V. Edited and translated by Ludwig Burgmann. Frankfurt: Löwenklau-Gesellschaft, 1983.
- The Rhodian Sea-Law. Edited and translated by Walter Ashburner. Oxford: Clarendon Press, 1909; reprint: Aalen: Scientia Verlag, 1976.
- Eisagoge = La «Introducción al derecho (Eisagoge)» del patriarca Focio. Edited and translated by Juan Signes Codoñer & Francisco Javier Andrés Santos. Madrid: Consejo Superior de Investigaciones Científicas, 2007.
- Basilika = Basilicorum libri LX. Edited by H.J. Scheltema and N. van der Wal. 17 vols. Groningen: J.B. Wolters, 1953–88.
- Nomos Stratiotikos = Le leggi penali militari dell’impero bizantino nell’alto Medioevo. Edited and translated by Pietro Verri. Rome: Scuola ufficiali carabinieri, 1978.
