= Nomos Georgikos =

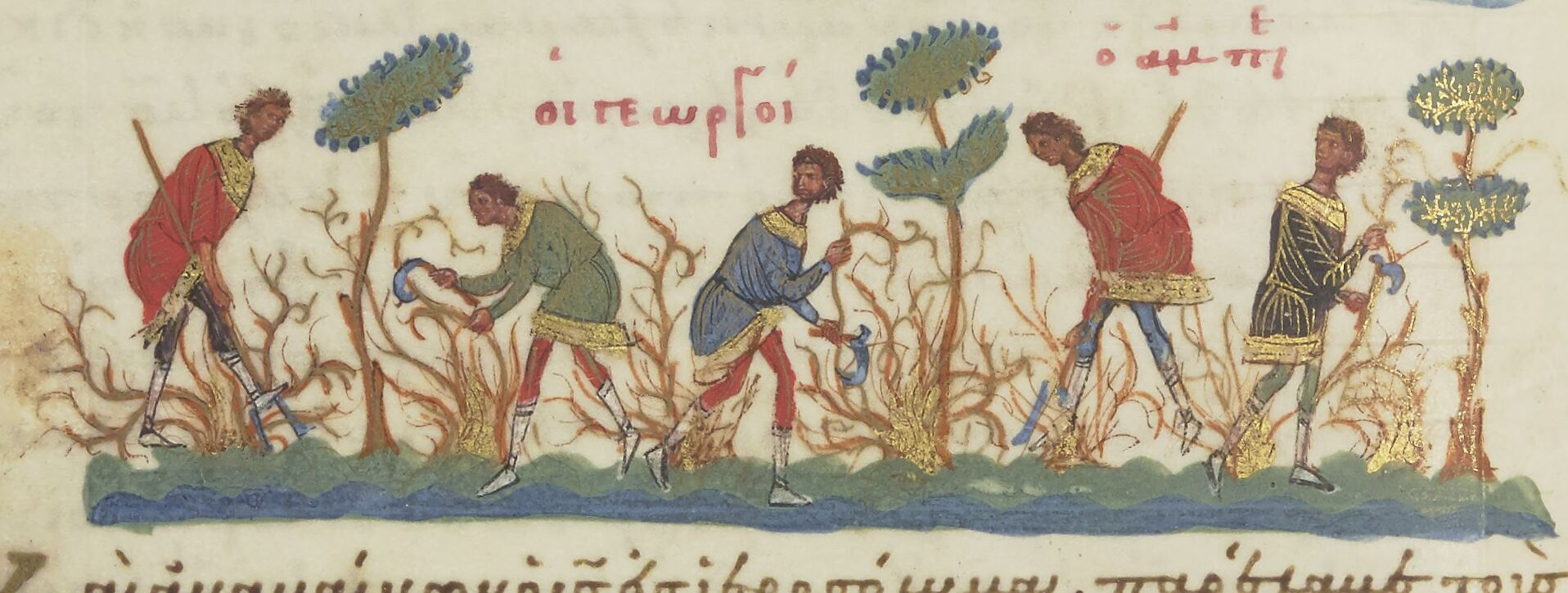
- The code of law focused on the peasantry (illustration from Minuscule 269)
- Original title: Νόμος Γεωργικός
- Created: 680s–700s
- Date effective: 700s–?
- Commissioned by: Justinian II (Heraclian dynasty)
- Subject: Code (Byzantine law)
- Purpose: Constitution

The Nomos Georgikos (Greek: Νόμος Γεωργικός, "Farmer's Law") was a Byzantine code of law promulgated likely during the reign of emperor Justinian II (r. 685–695 and 705–711), which has survived in dozens of 10th-century manuscripts. It focused largely on peasantry and rural villages, and protected farmer property, concerned with property damage, theft, taxation (the village as a fiscal unit with required communal tax), and included penalties on misdemeanors committed by villagers (also, tax-payers could appropriate criminal farmer's land). It originated in the hinterland, and was designed for the growing free peasantry-class, supplemented by the influx of South Slavs. The work had strong influence on the development of law among the South Slavs and East Slavs, particularly Serbian.

There is a group of Byzantologists that believe the code was never official, based on the exemption of naming the emperors in the introduction. There is a view that the code represented a variety of decisions and judgements carried out by the prefects of Thessaloniki, in immediate relation with the neighbouring Slavic population subject to the empire. The majority of the statutes are traditional orally inherited regulations, based on basic and practical knowledge of a case-by-case nature. The oral character of the statutes is evident in the fact that the first part of the code's chapter is found in Plato's "Laws. In general, it represents a significant break from the legislative tradition of its Roman predecessor, establishing a simplification of general rules into a codebook of basic content and form that emphasizes case-oriented rules for each particular situation in order to be applied to a simpler rural population where legislators were not jurisprudents.

Laws on crimes in agrarian setting are treated in 24 articles. The penalties were harsh (but corresponded to that time), not systemized, and are in some cases not graded in a uniform manner. Mutilation is a penalty in several of the crimes. Articles 46 and 47 regulated slaves as the lowest class, although at the time, there were not many in the rural setting. The code fails to address many important issues related to agriculture, such as the key issue of harvesting one's yield falling on someone else's land. Metayage is regulated in articles 11–15. The tenth of the yield (known as mortitis) cultivated by the farmer is given to the land owner, regulated in articles 9 and 10. Loan and interest is included in article 67, with loan grants linked to creditor's use of debtor's land, encouraging grants to farmers in case of financial instability.

At the same time as the Farmer's Law, two other code of laws were promulgated, the Nomos Stratiotikos ("Soldier's Law") for soldiers and the Nomos Rhodion Nautikos ("Rhodian Sea Law") for maritime law.

== See also ==
- Byzantine law
- Ekloge ton nomon
- Epanagoge
- Procheiron
- Nomos Stratiotikos
- Nomos Rhodion Nautikos

== Sources ==
- Šarkić, Srđan (2023). "The Influence of Byzantine Law in East Central Europe". Lectures on East Central European Legal History (2 ed.). CEA: 43–71.
- Simonović, Zoran (2012a). "Економска реализација земљишне својине према византијским законима VII и VIII века (еклога и земљораднички закон)". Teme. 1: 321–333 – via CEEOL.
- Simonović, Zoran (2012b). "Krivična dela vezana za privredni život Vizantije prema zakonima VII i VIII veka". Ekonomika. 58 (2): 110–120.
- Simonović, Zoran (2011). "Elementi kreditne politike prema vizantijskim zakonima VII i VIII veka (Ekloga, Zemljoradnički zakon i Pomorski zakon)". Ekonomika. 57 (3): 170–179.
- Toševa-Nikolovska, Daniela (2018). "Some Observations on the Nomos Georgikos". Colloquia Humanistica. 7. Instytut Slawistyki Polskiej Akademii Nauk.
- Vin, Yury Ya. (2016). "The Farmer's Law (Nomos Georgikos)–Source of law regulation and collective self-consciousness of rural community in medieval Byzantium". Vestnik Volgogradskogo Gosudarstvennogo Universiteta. Serii︠a︡ 4, Istorii︠a︡, Regionovedenie, Mezhdunarodnye Otnoshenii︠a︡ 21.5.
