= Baphius =

Byzantine Greek legal scholar

Baphius (Ancient Greek: Βάφιος) was a Greek commentator on the Byzantine code of laws called the Basilika.

His date and history are uncertain, but he probably lived in the 10th or 11th century. Seventeenth-century hagiographer and historian Joseph-Marie Suarez wrote that Baphius was not strictly a proper name, but an appellative epithet given to an annotator on the Rubrics of the Basilika. Other scholars reject this opinion. Some scholars call him "Salomon Baphius", but this naming is obscure and possibly incorrect.
