= Procheiron =

Byzantine legal code

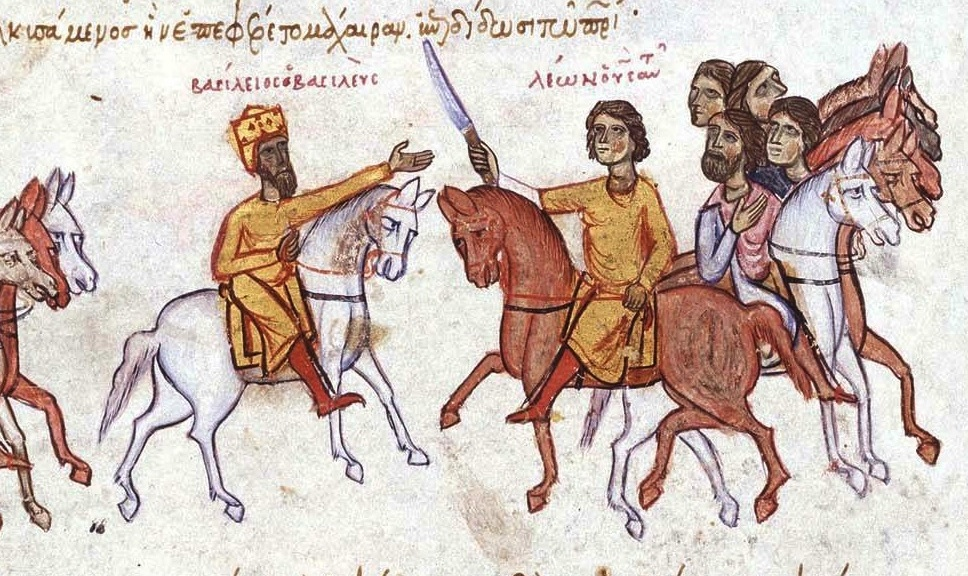
- Basil I and Leo VI
- Original title: Πρόχειρος νόμος
- Created: 907
- Date effective: 907–?
- Commissioned by: Leo VI the Wise (Macedonian dynasty)
- Subject: Code (Byzantine law)
- Purpose: Constitution

The Prócheiros nómos (Greek: Πρόχειρος νόμος, "Handbook, The Law Ready at Hand"), known as Procheiron (Cyrillic: Прохирон), is a Byzantine legal code compiled and adopted under the Macedonian dynasty. It served as the basis or complimentary to many legal codes. It replaced the Epanagoge compiled under Basil I, which itself replaced Ekloge ton nomon (c. 741) of the Isaurian dynasty. It was replaced some time in the 11th century.

== Overview ==
The legal code was adopted in 907 by Leo VI. It replaced the Epanagoge/Eisagoge of Basil I and Leo VI that was promulgated in 886, which itself replaced the Ekloge ton nomon (741) of the Isaurian dynasty. It is presented as a work connecting to the times before Iconoclasm, as to lend religious legitimacy to the Macedonian dynasty. The Procheiron was a revision of the Epanagoge, ordered by Leo VI in 907. The main compiler is unknown, although Symbatos mentioned in the Epitome Legum may have participated.

The work includes 40 titles that codified fundamental laws of Byzantine civil, criminal, and partly judicial and church law, mainly comprising private and penal law. It used mainly the Greek translations and comments of Justinian's Institutes. Although restoring Justinian's laws, and invalidating part of the Ekloge, many laws were directly adopted from it. Its main purpose was to be used by the judges, as the Ekloge.

== Legacy ==
The 14th-century Procheiron Auctum ("Expanded Handbook") had 40 titles as well as 32–33 supplementary laws based on the Procheiron, expanded with laws from Ekloge ton nomon, the Epanagoge and Basilika.

The work had strong influence on Slavic law, particularly Serbian.

== See also ==
- Byzantine law
- Nomos Georgikos
- Nomos Stratiotikos
- Nomos Rhodion Nautikos

== Sources ==
- van Bochove, Thomas. "The Procheiros Nomos and the Eisagoge." A Companion to Byzantine Law: From the Foundation of Constantinople (330) until the End of the Macedonian Dynasty (1056). Brill, 2025. 277-296.
- Oikonomides, Nicolas (1976). "Leo VI's Legislation of 907 Forbidding Fourth Marriages: An Interpolation in the "Procheiros Nomos" (IV, 25-27)". Dumbarton Oaks Papers. 30: 173–193.
- Цибранска-Костова, Марияна. Прохирон/Закон градски: юридическото наследство на православното славянство. Izdatelstvo" Valentin Trajanov", 2021.
- Ђорђевић, Александар. "ГРАДСКИ ЗАКОН КАО САСТАВНИ ДЕО САВИНОГ ЗАКОНОПРАВИЛА." CHURCH STUDIES 1.16 (2019).
- Tsibranska-Kostova, Mariyana. "Правни субекти в славянския превод на Прохирона." PALAEOBULGARICA/СТАРОБЪЛГАРИСТИКА 4 (2018): 37-72.
- Щапов, Ярослав Николаевич. "Прохирон в восточнославянской письменности." Византийский временник 38.63 (1977): 48-58.
- Smochina, N. (1968). "Le Procheiros Nomos de l'Empereur Basile (867-879) et son application chez les Roumains au XIVe siècle". Balkan Studies. 9 (1): 167–208.
- Šarkić, Srđan (2023). "The Influence of Byzantine Law in East Central Europe" (PDF). Lectures on East Central European Legal History (2 ed.). CEA: 43–71.
