= Basilika =

Collection of laws completed c. 892 CE in Byzantine Constantinople

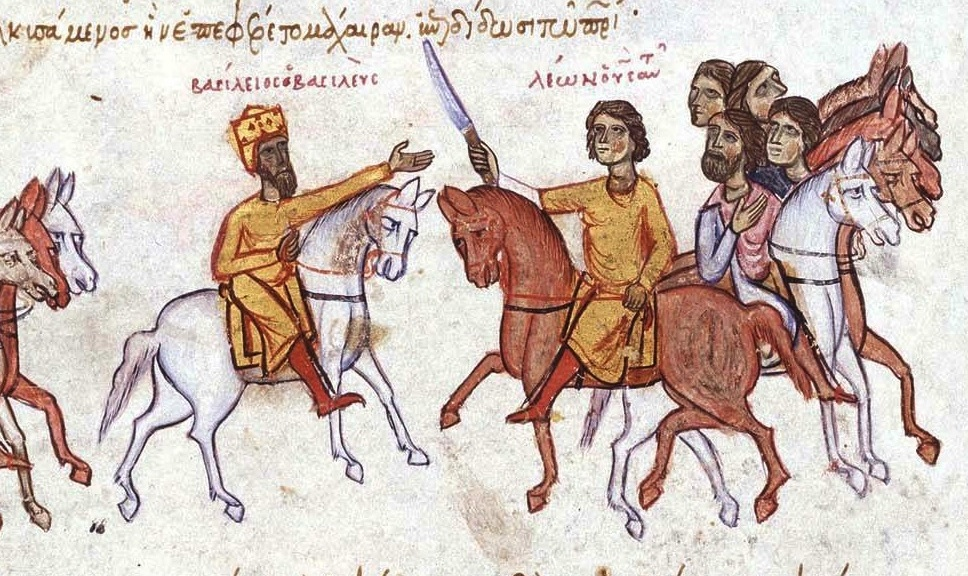
Leo VI (right) and Basil I (left), from the 12th-century Madrid Skylitzes.

The Basilika (Greek: τὰ βασιλικά, romanized: ta basiliká, "the imperial [laws]") was a collection of laws completed c. 892 AD in Constantinople by order of the Byzantine emperor Leo VI the Wise during the Macedonian dynasty. This was a continuation of the efforts of his father, Basil I, to simplify and adapt the Emperor Justinian I's Corpus Juris Civilis code of law issued between 529 and 534 which had become outdated. The term comes from the Greek adjective Basilika meaning "Imperial (laws or enactments)" and not from the Emperor Basil's name; both share a common etymology from the term Basileus.

== Background ==
Many changes had taken place within the Byzantine Empire in between Justinian and Leo VI's reign, chiefly the change in language from Latin to Greek. During Justinian's era, Latin was still in common use and Court documents were written in it. However, by the 9th century the use of Latin was obsolete, which in turn made the Corpus Juris Civilis code hard to use for Greek speakers, even in the capital of Constantinople. Furthermore, many of the laws within the Corpus Juris Civilis no longer pertained to most people, and new laws rose up to take their place. This necessitated an overhaul of the Byzantine legal system.

Justinian's Codex had effectively ended juristic developments for the next couple of centuries. Moreover, the Byzantine legal system operated as a codified system, wherein the sentence given by a judge needed to be grounded in a passage of law previously issued by a legislator. This made it impossible for a judge to set precedents. There was vast confusion amongst judges as to which legal documents they should refer to (Justinian's Codex or other books of law which had been written in the ensuing centuries). Additionally, Justinian's Codex had officially stripped the legislative branch of its authority, making it hard for judges to know which law codes they should follow. With a code of law in Greek, lawyers were able to use it in their cases, making its practicality invaluable. This was a stark contrast to the Corpus Juris, which proved to be too complex and comprehensive to be used practicably even within its own time.

In addition, the Basilika and similar legal reform projects helped retain and reinvigorate the Romanitas, or Roman-ness, of the Byzantine Empire. In the same time period, the Carolingian Empire and the Papacy in the west and the First Bulgarian Empire in the Balkans grew in power, and challenged the secular and religious leadership of the Byzantine Empire. Louis II was bemused by the error in Latin within a letter from the Byzantine emperor, and wrote a critical letter accusing the "Greeks" for turning their backs on the city of Rome, the Roman people, and the Roman language (i.e., Latin), and thus were unworthy of being Roman emperors. Although the Arab Umayyad and Abbasid caliphates were powerful geopolitical competitors, and indeed had conquered large areas of Byzantine territory, the Arabs did not challenge Byzantium's Roman identity, but instead claimed to be the heirs of Antiquity.

The Basilika also presents itself as a connection back to earlier times before the period of Iconoclasm, lending the Macedonian dynasty a sense of religious legitimacy. This began with Basil I and his desire to distance himself from the Iconoclasts, and to connect himself and his sons with their Great Predecessor, Justinian I.

== Structure ==
The sixty books of the Basilika have had a profound impact on the scholarship of the Byzantine Empire because they preserved many legal documents. Within the sixty books of law, in addition to the preservation of Justinian's Codex, new legal customs were also included which had evolved in the centuries. It also included works of law initiated by Basil I, including the Procheiron (a handbook of civil laws and customs which excluded those no longer in use) and the Epanagoge (an expanded Procheiron which included an introduction and summary) as well as numerous decrees of the Iconoclast Emperors. However, the Code still followed the tradition of the Corpus Juris, beginning with ecclesiastical law, sources of law, procedure, private law, administrative law, and criminal law.

It greatly differed however in its use of commentaries (scholia), which were pieces of juristic works from the sixth and seventh centuries, from Baphius among others in the tenth or eleventh centuries, as well as from the twelfth and thirteenth centuries. Previously, Justinian I had outlawed commentary on his set of laws, making the scholia on the Basilika unique. The actual format of the books themselves vary greatly. Some are represented in one manuscript, which may or may not contain scholia or full parts of other juristic works which have been mentioned. Likewise, some books have been lost entirely.

== Legacy ==
Unlike Justinian's Codex which continued to have an impact in the West as the continuation of Roman Law, the Basilika's influence was limited to the Eastern Empire. This included having a lasting impact on Greece's modern law code. Following the Greek War of Independence against Turkey in 1821, the Basilika was adopted until the introduction of the present Civil Code of Greece. This long continuation of Roman influenced Byzantine law presents a stark contrast to the legal system of the West.

== See also ==
- Ekloge ton nomon
- Epanagoge
- Procheiron

== Sources ==
- Šarkić, Srđan (2023). "The Influence of Byzantine Law in East Central Europe". Lectures on East Central European Legal History (2 ed.). CEA: 43–71.
