= Lex animata =

Concept in Roman law

Lex animata is a 12th century Latin translation of the Greco-Roman concept νόμος ἔμψυχος, nómos émpsychos, which equates to the "living law".

Originating in Hellenistic philosophy and repurposed by Themistius in the 4th century, the identification of the Roman sovereign as nomos empsychos was established in law by the emperor Justinian I in his Novellae Constitutiones, and introduced into European civil law through the discovery of The Authenticum by the medieval glossators in Bologna.

It would be a concept that would influence medieval ideas and shape early modern political thought about the state.

== History ==
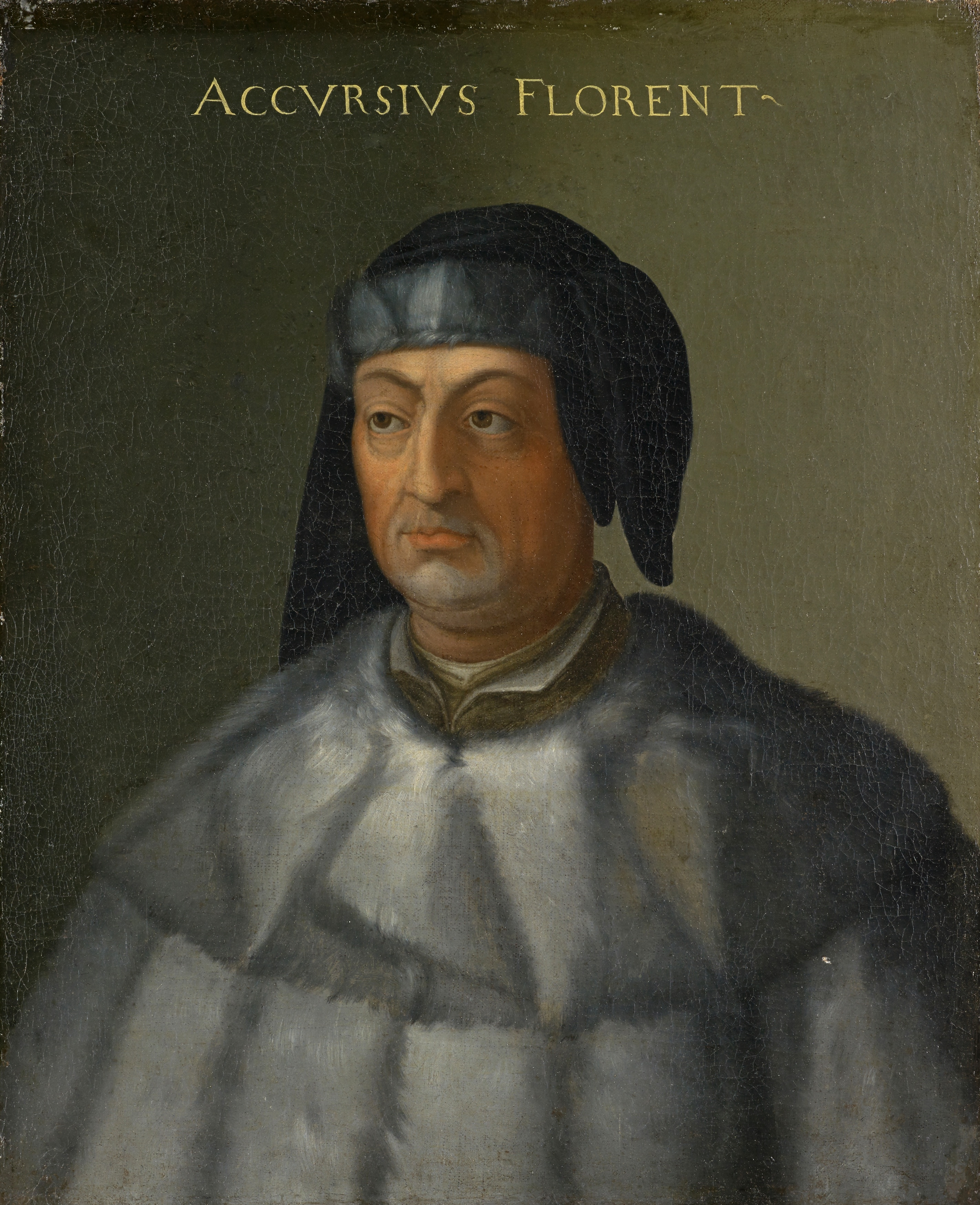
Accursius (c. 1182 – 1263) contributed to establishing the doctrine of lex animata in medieval law.

=== 4th century BCE to 1st century CE ===
Mostly known as a Platonic idea of the philosopher acting as founding lawgiver to the politeia, Nómos émpsychos is not a general idea of rulership that was universally agreed on. The genesis of the idea is identified as coming from three philosophers, found in six locations of 4 distinct works. This includes the philosophers of Archytas of Tarentum, pseudo-Diotogenes, and Philo of Alexandria, deduced from the Protagoras (dialogue), the Anonymus Iamblichi, Thucydides, Antiphon, and the Gorgias's Callicles and the Republic's Thrasymachus and Glaucon. Archytas, a contemporary of Plato, is likely the origin, due to or related to a debate Archytas had with Polyarchus about the nature of pleasure and its relationship to politics.

Archytas identifies two types of law: there is ἔμψυχος ("animate") law, which is "king," and ἄψυχος ("inanimate") law, which is written. He does not explain what animate law to be a king means, but it was commonplace then to formulate law as a king (such as unwritten law, like the norms of society); whereas contemporary philosophers like Xenophone describe a wise ruler and in Nicomachean Ethics, Aristotle describes the judge to whom disputants appeal as "justice animate, as it were", also interpreted as a "living justice" (δίκαιον ἔμψυχον, díkaion émpsychon).

The pseudo-Diotogenes version, now regarded as a pseudo-Pythagorean work, contrasts to Archytas' philosophy that kings are bound to laws and instead views kings holding unaccountable power due to their godlike status and being livings laws themselves. Philo's variant attributes the notion to people not strictly defined as kings such as the Jewish prophets.

=== 2nd to 8th century CE ===
The first surviving use of the form nomos empsychos is found in a pseudo-Pythagorean work, attributed to Archytas but probably dated after 50 BC.

Justinian is considered the first emperor to claim nomos empsychos, even though legally the idea was not that different from the past. Historian Sviatoslav Dmitriev claims there has been confusion in modern scholarship due to the intermingling of the "philosophical" and "legalistic" traditions that Justinian created. Centuries earlier, Themistius was the first to use it to describe the emperors supremacy over the law, using it with regards to the Emperors Jovian (r. 363–364), Valens (r. 364–378), and Theodosius (r. 379–395), and this could be seen to be an expression of the imperial court's ideology

The codification by Justinian would later be rediscovered in western Europe with the Authenticum, with the Latin rendering of the concept as Lex Animata. The concept had gained wide currency by late antiquity. Justinian's formulation, compiled by Tribonian, runs:

The Emperor, however, is not subject to the rules which We have just formulated, for God has made the laws themselves subject to his control by giving him to men as an incarnate law [nomos empsychos]. (Novellae 105.2)

Legal philosopher Akos Tussay argues that Themistius’ usage is when court flattery became legal principle. Later echoed in Justinian’s Novels, Tussay believes it to be an evolution from the pseudo-Diotogenes source, which he regards as largely independent of the Archytean tradition.

=== 12th century CE and onwards ===
In the Middle Ages, the glossators of the 12th and 13th centuries, notably Accursius, applied the concept of lex animata to the Holy Roman emperor. Accursius rendered the principle in the Code of Justinian as princeps est lex animata in terris ("the prince is the law animate on earth"), and argued that all holders of ordinary jurisdiction over particular geographical areas derived their right from the emperor as living law.

The term was also used of the pope by hierocratic writers, and it was ultimately extended to individual kings, as the French jurist Barthélemy de Chasseneuz did in the case of the king of France in his 1529 Catalogus gloriae mundi. The 14th century Italian jurist Baldus de Ubaldis wrote, "Rex est lex animata ... Ego dormio et cor meum, id est, Rex meus, vigilat" ("The king is the law animate ... I sleep and my heart, that is, my king, keeps watch"), and in his 1598 The True Law of Free Monarchies, James VI of Scotland also referred to the concept when he affirmed "the old definition ... which makes the King to be a speaking law and the law a dumb King".

The concept of the king as lex animata faced resistance in medieval English law, however. When Parliament ratified the deposition of Richard II in 1399, it listed as one reason the fact that Richard had believed "that the laws were in his own mouth". Despite paralleling Byzantine political ideas in other respects, Islamic philosophy also departed from the notion of nomos empsychos by conceiving the caliphs as administering the sharia established by Muhammad rather than as lawgivers in their own right. The idea of the lex animata was later deconstructed more systematically by Montesquieu and other constitutional thinkers of the Enlightenment, with Montesquieu pronouncing that iudex est lex loquens: "the judge", not the king, "is the law speaking", and the judge is not animate, but "inanimate", deriving rather than inventing the law.

== Impact ==
It would come to serve as one of the foundations of later civil law in the West.

In historiography, it's used to distinguish emperors from the principate and the dominate. It was based on constitutional law, with the idea that there was a change in the power of the emperor as embodied with the concept of nomos empsychos.

Along with the church's independence by Constantine, it would shape early modern political thought. This includes the concepts of the sovereign, the judiciary, the state, the separation of powers, and likely permeated all ideas in the medieval and early modern political and legal thinking.

According to Kenneth Dyson (2009, p. vii),

"[t]he tradition to which it alludes emphasises the autonomy, distinctiveness and normative character of public power. It attributes action in the service of this power to a fictional person and deliberative agent – the state – in ways that recall Thomas Hobbes, Samuel Pufendorf, and Christian Wolff. The classic state tradition serves to depersonalise public power in a dual sense, seeing it as distinct from both ruler and ruled."

== Modern usage ==
The idea of lex animata is sometimes used in modern political debate, usually to scorn an opponent for being too self-important or delusional about his insights into the law and constitutional affairs. In judicial circles it is sometimes used in jest, recognising a peer as an authority on the law in general.

== See also ==
- Body politic § The king's body politic

== Sources ==
- Ando, Clifford (2001), "10. Conclusion: Singulare et Unicum Imperium", Imperial Ideology and Provincial Loyalty in the Roman Empire, University of California Press, p. 409, doi:10.1525/9780520923720-013, ISBN 978-0-520-92372-0
- Bleicken, Jochen (1978). Prinzipat und Dominat: Gedanken zur Periodisierung der römischen Kaiserzeit. Frankfurter historische Vorträge (1. Aufl ed.). Wiesbaden: Steiner. ISBN 978-3-515-02876-9.
- Sviatoslav, Dmitriev (2022-02-07). "The Political Philosophy of John Lydus and Early Byzantine Imperial Identity". In Stewart, Michael Edward (ed.). The Routledge Handbook on Identity in Byzantium (1 ed.). London: Routledge. doi:10.4324/9780429031373. ISBN 978-0-429-03137-3.
- Tussay, Ákos (2022). A History of the nomos empsychos idea (Thesis). Miklós Könczöl, Szilárd Tattay. doi:10.15774/PPKE.JAK.2022.010.
- Tussay, Ákos (2024-09-20). "Nomos Empsychos: towards a Historiography of the Greek Living Law Idea". Polis: The Journal for Ancient Greek and Roman Political Thought. 41 (3): 456–478. doi:10.1163/20512996-12340447. ISSN 0142-257X.
- Tuori, Kaius (2016-11-24). The Emperor of Law. Oxford University Press. doi:10.1093/acprof:oso/9780198744450.001.0001. ISBN 978-0-19-874445-0.
- Wolfsdorf, David, ed. (2020). Early Greek Ethics (1st ed.). Oxford: Oxford University Press. ISBN 978-0-19-875867-9. OCLC 1128194028.
