= Ekloge ton nomon =

Byzantine legal code

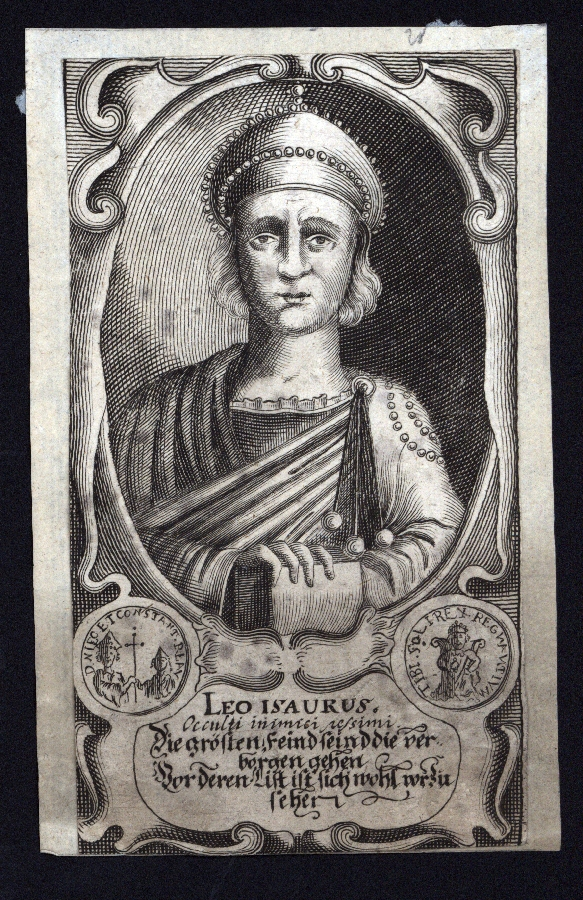
- Leo III the Isaurian
- Original title: Ἐκλογὴ τῶν νόμων
- Created: 741
- Date effective: 741–886
- Superseded: 886 (by Epanagoge/Eisagoge)
- Commissioned by: Leo III (Isaurian dynasty)
- Subject: Code (Byzantine law)
- Purpose: Constitution

The Ekloge ton nomon (Greek: Ἐκλογὴ τῶν νόμων, "Selection of the Laws") is an 8th-century Byzantine legal code compiled and adopted under the Isaurian dynasty. It served as the basis of, or was complimentary to many legal codes. It was replaced in 886 by the Epanagoge/Eisagoge of the Macedonian dynasty.

== Overview ==
Scholarship is divided on the dating of the adoption, to either 726 and the reign of Leo III (r. 726–741), or to 741 and the reign of Constantine V (r. 741–775). According to V. Minale (2012), it was most likely issued in March 741. Šarkić (2023) deems 741 as more probable. There are views that the structure of the work is original, not adopted from any other model. Leo III wished to modify Justinian's laws in the most important issues of daily life, and not conduct a complete reform. Its purpose, according to its commentary, was simplification of the dikaiodosia ("jurisdiction").

The Ekloge is a compilation of Byzantine law in 18 "books" or chapters, organized by Leo III in his name and that of his son Constantine. The code has at its base three important elements, that of Justinian's laws adapted to contemporary circumstances, canon law, and finally common law as formed during the 7th century. It was based on Roman law, but written in Greek as to be available and used by the people and judges. Its main purpose was to be used by the judges, to restore order in the judiciary. It is a revision of Roman law, with Christian principles, as Leo comments, "correction towards greater humanity", and revised Justinian's Institutes, Digest, Code and Novellae. The first 16 chapters are dedicated to civil law (marital, inheritance, status, obligations), the 17th to criminal law, and the last, 18th, to division of spoils of war. The code's chapters are mostly devoted to private law (mainly marital), the rest to criminal law (with lists of punishments). It seems to have been quickly supplemented with Appendix Eclogae, of mainly penal regulations.

In civil law, women's rights and children's rights were improved at the expense of the father. In criminal law, capital punishment was restricted to treason, military desertion, certain homicidies, heresy and slander, and removed death penalty for many previous capital offenses, many punishments replaced with mutilation. Equal punishment regardless of social class was prescribed. As to remove bribery, salaries were provided for officials and judges, with the prohibition of accepting gifts. Laws on crimes against economical life, such as theft, are mostly treated in header (or book) XVII. Loan and interest is regulated in chapter X, and the view on interest was adopted from Justinian's laws, and in case of dispute, the valuation was made by state procurators, while children of debtors were protected from slave work, also adopted from Justinian's laws, and wives were protected from having their dowry used by the husband to settle a debt. chapter XII is dedicated to emphyteusis, while chapter XIII examines farming land lease.

There were two notable revisions of the Ekloge, that of Ecloga Aucta (or Eklogadion) which returned many of Justinian's laws; and that of Ecloga Privata Acta which was a compilation of the Ekloge and Ecloga Aucta.

The Epanagoge/Eisagoge of Basil I (r. 867–886) and Leo VI (r. 886–912) of the Macedonian dynasty formally replaced (and rejected) the Ekloge.

== Legacy ==
The code is among the most important Byzantine legal works from the period of the 7th–8th centuries. Despite being the work of an Iconoclast, it had a strong influence on Byzantine law. Its popularity is evident from the many copies and compilations.

The Ekloge served as a "diffused" basis for the 9th-century Slavic Zakon sudnyj ljudem, attributed to either an ecclesiastical origin in the Christianization of Great Moravia and Cyril and Methodius, or a secular origin with the Christianization of the Bulgarian state. It was found in "derivates", collections which also included other Byzantine codes, in 12th-century Epitome Marciana, and 12th-century Norman–Italian Procheiron Legum/Procheiron Calabriae which is a simple-styled compilation based on a version closely related to the Ecloga Privata Aucta and Epitomae Legum. The 14th-century Ecloga ad Prochiron mutata is a synthesis of the Ekloge, Procheiron and Eisagoge. Articles from the Ekloge appeared in the Moravian Ustjugskaja Kormčaja, the Bulgarian-origin text of Efremovskaja Kormčaja (found in compilation of Yaroslav the Wise), the Serbian Zakonopravilo of Archbishop Sava (t. 1219–1233), the Imperial Serbian Dušan's Code (1349), etc. There were also an Arabic adaptation and Armenian translation. The work had strong influence on Slavic law, particularly Serbian.

== See also ==
- Byzantine law
- Nomos Georgikos, code of law focusing of peasantry
- Nomos Rhodion Nautikos, code of law focusing on maritime
- Nomos Stratiotikos, code of law focusing on soldiery
- Procheiron, constitution of the Macedonian dynasty

== Annotations ==
1. Ekloge ton nomon is translated as "Selection of the Laws". It is also known as the "Isaurian Ekloge", after the Isaurian dynasty, and simply Ecloga. In Slavic, it is simply known as Ekloga (Cyrillic: Еклога). The word ekloge (εκλογή) means "choice, selection, election".

== Sources ==
- Lysenko, Olga A. (2020). "Ehe-und Familienrecht in der byzantinischen Ekloge (8. Jahrhundert) mit Blick auf römisches, orientalisches und Kirchenrecht". Journal on European History of Law. 11 (2): 118–122.
- Minale, Valerio Massimo (2012). "About the reception of Isaurian Ekloge in Byzantine Italy: An effort of comparison with Slavian world and mainly Stefan Dušan's Serbian empire". Зборник радова Византолошког института. 49: 43–74.
- Šarkić, Srđan (2023). "The Influence of Byzantine Law in East Central Europe". Lectures on East Central European Legal History (2 ed.). CEA: 43–71.
- Simonović, Zoran (2012a). "Економска реализација земљишне својине према византијским законима VII и VIII века (еклога и земљораднички закон)". Teme. 1: 321–333 – via CEEOL. "Ekloge ton nomon"
- Simonović, Zoran (2012b). "Krivična dela vezana za privredni život Vizantije prema zakonima VII i VIII veka". Ekonomika. 58 (2): 110–120. "Ekloge ton nomon"
- Simonović, Zoran (2011). "Elementi kreditne politike prema vizantijskim zakonima VII i VIII veka (Ekloga, Zemljoradnički zakon i Pomorski zakon)". Ekonomika. 57 (3): 170–179.
