= Epanagoge =

Byzantine law book

The Epanagoge (Greek: Ἐπαναγωγή, "return to the point"), more properly the Eisagoge (Greek: Εἰσαγωγή [τοῦ νόμου], "Introduction [to the law]"), is a Byzantine law book promulgated in 886. Begun under Basil I the Macedonian (r. 867–886), it was only completed under his son and successor, Leo VI the Wise (r. 886–912). As its name suggests, it was meant to be an introduction to the legislation of the Basilika, published later during Leo's reign.

The work, organized in 40 volumes, covers almost all spheres of law, and was explicitly meant to replace the earlier Ekloge ton nomon, dating to the iconoclast Isaurian dynasty. Nevertheless, it draws some inspiration from the Ekloge; the main source, however, is the Corpus Juris Civilis of Justinian I (r. 527–565), albeit often heavily altered. Patriarch Photius of Constantinople worked on its compilation, and wrote the preface and the two sections dealing with the position and powers of the Byzantine emperor and the patriarch; notably, the powers of the patriarch appear broader than in Justinian's legislation, both with regard to the emperor and towards the other patriarchates of the Pentarchy.

The Epanagoge was withdrawn from official use soon after its publication, being replaced by the Prochiron (which was earlier considered an antecessor of the Epanagoge) twenty years later, but served as the basis for several private law books, such as the Epanagoge Aucta or the Syntagma Canonum. Through its translation into Slavonic, the Epanagoge found its way into Russian canon law, including the 13th-century Kormchaya Kniga. Its provisions on the patriarch's and church's position vis-a-vis the temporal ruler played a great role in the controversy around Patriarch Nikon in the 17th century.

== Sources ==
- Kazhdan, Alexander Petrovich, ed. (1991). The Oxford Dictionary of Byzantium. New York, New York and Oxford, United Kingdom: Oxford University Press. ISBN 978-0-19-504652-6.
- Vasiliev, Alexander Alexandrovich (1952). History of the Byzantine Empire, 324–1453. Madison, Wisconsin: The University of Wisconsin Press. ISBN 0-299-80925-0.
