= Theodosiopolis =

Theodosiopolis or Theodosioupolis (Ancient Greek: Θεοδοσιούπολις, "city (polis) of Theodosius") can refer to several cities of classical antiquity (re)named after emperor Theodosius:

In Europe

- Panion in Thrace, modern Barbaros in Turkey
- Aprus in Thrace, modern Kermeyan in Turkey

In Asia

- Erzurum in Turkey
- Perperene, located today near Bergama in Turkey
- Euaza in the region of Ephesus, located today in Turkey
- Resaina, the modern Ras al-Ayn in Syria

In Africa

- Theodosiopolis in Arcadia in Lower Egypt
- Tebtunis in Lower Egypt
- Hebenu in Upper Egypt
