= Memnon of Ephesus =

Bishop of Ephesus

Memnon was metropolitan bishop of Ephesus during the third ecumenical council.

== At the Council of Ephesus ==
At the Council he was a supporter of Cyril of Alexandria. Delays in the opening of the council were blamed by Nestorius on Memnon.

Memnon hosted the second session of the Council in his episcopal palace and at the fourth session Cyril and Memnon presented a formal protest against John of Antioch for convening a separate conciliabulum, which condemned both of them.

== Bassianus ==
Reportedly out of jealousy, Memnon sought to get rid of Bassianus, a priest under him, by ordaining him to the bishopric of Evaza. Bassianus refused the position and in 444 became, by an irregular process, Memnon's second successor.
