= Zakonopravilo =

13th-century Serbian Orthodox Church code

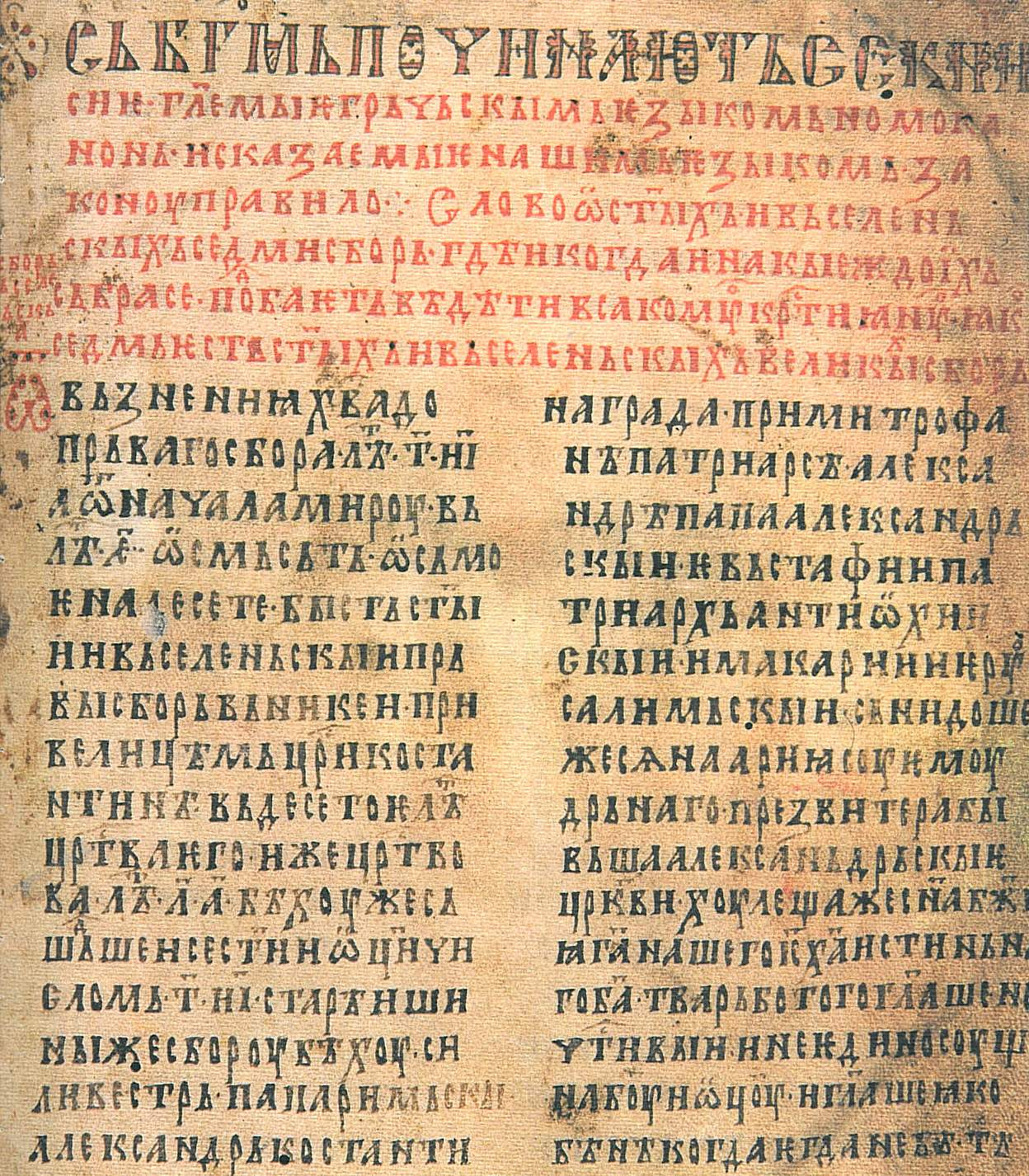
- First page of the Ilovica manuscript (1262)
- Original title: Zakonopravilo (Законоправило)
- Created: 1219
- Date effective: 1219–1349
- Superseded: 1349
- Location: Serbia
- Author: Archbishop Sava
- Subject: Code
- Purpose: Constitution

The Zakonopravilo (Serbian: Законоправило) was the ecclesiastical code of law of the Serbian Church, a nomokanon (collection of canon- and civil law) compiled between 1204–1219 by priest-monk Sava, the Serbian prince of the Nemanjić dynasty who became the first Serbian Archbishop (t. 1219–1233). It is made up of 70 chapters, a compilation of several books and works, of various content and origin, on Eastern Roman (Byzantine) basis. The work shaped legislation among the medieval Slavic peoples, and is regarded one of the most important books of Serb cultural tradition. It is the oldest known constitution of Serbia and is today designated an official legal code of the Serbian Orthodox Church.

== Background ==
=== Nomocanon ===
The nomocanon is a collection of church laws and canons, of civil law and ecclesiastical law. The word nomocanon was first used in 451 as a Church journal of the Council of Chalcedon, in which summaries of regulations are included, compiled by Stephen of Ephesus. The Canon collection which include systematic presentation of laws depending on legal problems in both church- and civil law, was first compiled by Antiochian jurist John Scholastikos.

Scholastikos compiled the Nomocanon in Fifty Titles prior to his ordination in c. 550; it was compilation of canon law divided into 50 titles which was in use until the 12th century. Scholastikos' other collection, from Justinian's Novellae in 87 Titles, was included into one collection in the second half of the 6th century.

The Canonical Syntagma, a Church journal compiled during the reign of Patriarch Sergius (t. 610–638), was coupled with the Collectio tripartita compilation of Justinian's laws by the jurist Julian in the early 7th century to become the Nomocanon in 14 Titles, later revised in 883 and declared an official legal document of the Eastern Church in 920.

With the Christianization of Slavs, the first translations of Greek nomocanons into Old Slavic were made by Methodios in 865–885. The Nomocanon of Methodius was based on the 6th-century nomocanon of Scholastikos, and the compilation also included a secular part, Zakon Sudnyi Liudem ("Court Law for the People"), which was based on the 8th-century Ekloge ton nomon. This first Slavic nomocanon was used in Bulgaria, which became increasingly politically strong in the late 9th and 10th centuries. After the Byzantine reconquest of the Balkans, the Slavic nomocanon was suppressed. In the Kievan Rus, however, manuscripts of this Slavic nomocanon survived, most importantly in the Efremovskaia Kormchaia from the 12th (or late 11th) century. The early Slavic nomocanons had the intention to regulate religious life of the baptized Slavs and also subject them to secular Byzantine law. At this time, the Balkan Slavs worked on establishing their own autonomous churches with Slavic liturgy.

=== Serbia and Archbishop Sava ===
During the Nemanjić dynasty (1166–1371), the Serbian state flourished in the spheres of politics, religion and culture. Monasteries were built, far more than in previous centuries. The country was expanding and urban life emerged. Trade, mining and manufacturing expanded. The ruling family became prosperous and was known for piety. Formal establishment of a kingdom (1217) and religious independence (1219) came after political efforts by Stefan Nemanja (founder of the dynasty) and his sons, Stefan Nemanjić (the first Nemanjić king) and Sava Nemanjić (the first Serbian archbishop). A legal system established regulations for the Serbian kingdom and Serbian church. During this period, only the Byzantine emperor could establish legal acts and laws to fill the gaps in common law.

The monk-scribe Domentijan wrote in the Life of St. Sava how Archbishop Sava returned from Nikaea, where he received autocephaly for the Serbian Church, and stayed at Philokalou in Thessaloniki where he had transcribed many legal- and canonical works for the Church organization. Sava most likely presented a nearly finished code to Patriarch Manuel. He had begun working on a code many years prior, perhaps in 1204 when becoming an archimandrite at Hilandar, and continued on it between 1206–1217 while at the hermitage near Studenica. Sava collected and translated Greek works for many years. With the Zakonopravilo, Sava authored the legal code of the Serbian Orthodox Church and organized church- and civil law in the Serbian state. The work was a symbol of Serbian autocephaly and its safeguard and judicial foundation. His nomocanon is unique in its selection of works. He gave each of his bishops' a copy for them to organize their bishoprics.

== Content ==
The Zakonopravilo is in fact a compilation of several books and works, of various content and origin, on Eastern Roman (Byzantine) basis for the usage by Orthodox Slavs. It includes content from more than hundred articles of canonical, civic, liturgical and morality content, from church councils, synods, works by Byzantine emperors, patriarchs, bishops, hegumen and priests.

The work is made up of 70 chapters, the first six are part of the introduction, and then there are 64 chapters, of which 44 are of canonical nature, and 20 are of civil law. Church law is mainly adopted from two 6th-century Greek Canon law collections, the Synopsis of Stephen of Ephesus with commentary by Alexios Aristenos, and the Canonical Syntagma of 14 Titles of unknown authorship with commentary by John Zonaras. There were 859 canons included, out of which c. 700 were taken from the Synopsis and Zonaras' commentary. Regarding Civil law, based on Roman–Byzantine law, notable excerpts were taken from Justinian's Novellae in 87 Chapters edited by John Scholastikos, the whole of the Procheiron (known in Serbian as Zakon gradski), and three Novellae of Alexios Komnenos regarding marital law.

Sava chose the sources, translated them, and also edited laws, in order for them to be used in the Serbian church and state.

=== Introduction ===
The introduction includes six introductory chapters:

- A word about the Seven Holy and Ecumenical Councils.
- Interpretation of the line that follows: "Jesus Christ, have mercy on us."
- Interpretation of the Nicene Creed: "We believe in one God, the Father Almighty, Maker of all things visible and invisible."
- Interpretation of the prayer which the Lord Jesus Christ taught the apostles, and us along with them, with which to pray, saying: "Our Father who art in heaven."
- Prologue of those who reduced the sacred rules to 14 chapters.
- Nomocanon in 14 Titles.

Then follows the introduction to the work with commentary on the content of the sacred canons, seven councils, and some local ones, the rules compiled by certain Holy Fathers, and the number of rules of each council.

=== Chapters ===
- Chapter 1: The rules of the Apostles and Church fathers with commentary of Alexios Aristenos (85 laws).
- Chapter 2: The rules of Saint Paul (17 laws).
- Chapter 3: The rules of both Saints Peter and Paul (17 laws), somewhat different from Greek original manuscripts.
- Chapter 4: The rules of All Holy Apostles (2 laws).
- Chapter 5: The rules of the First Ecumenical Council.
- Chapter 6: The rules of the holy Synod of Ancyra (25 laws, minus rule #1).
- Chapter 7: The rules of the holy Synod of Neo-Caesarea (15 laws).
- Chapter 8: The rules of the holy Synod of Gangra (20 laws).
- Chapter 9: The rules of the holy Synod of Antioch (25 laws).
- Chapter 10: The rules of the holy Synod of Laodicea (59 laws).
- Chapter 11: The rules of the Second Ecumenical Council, including a shortened text of Stephen of Ephesus on hierarchy.
- Chapter 12: The rules of the Third Ecumenical Council.
- Chapter 13: The rules of the Fourth Ecumenical Council (30 laws).
- Chapter 14: The rules of the holy Synod of Sardica (21 laws).
- Chapter 15: The rules of the holy Synod of Carthage (138 laws).
- Chapter 16: On events in Constantinople, the dispute between Agapius and Gabadius regarding the seat in Bosra.
- Chapter 17: The rules of the Sixth Ecumenical Council held in Constantinople.
- Chapter 18: The rules of the Seventh Ecumenical Council held in Nikaea (22 laws).
- Chapter 19: The rules of the First and Second Councils, held in Constantinople, in the Church of the Holy Apostles (17 laws).
- Chapter 20: The three rules of the council in the Church of Hagia Sophia in Constantinople.
- Chapter 21: The rules from the epistles of Saint Basil the Great addressed to Amphilochius, Diodorus, and others (91 laws). This is perhaps the only chapter that Sava transcribed in Philokallou in 1220.
- Chapter 22: The 26 rules of Saint Basil the Great about penance for sinning.
- Chapter 23: The rules of Saint Basil the Great about the size and looks of the places for those who do penance.
- Chapter 24: A lesson about the divine service, Holy Communion, and those who take care of those who do penance, which Basil the Great dedicated to the presbyter.
- Chapter 25: A letter of Basil the Great to Gregory of Nazianzus about the structure of monasticism.
- Chapter 26: The epistle of Saint Tarasios to Pope Adrian I, forbidding ordination through payment.
- Chapter 27: Saint Dionysius on Great Saturday and fasting.
- Chapter 28: The rules of Saint Peter regarding those who left during persecution and then felt remorse (14 laws).
- Chapter 29: Gregory Thaumaturgus of Neocaesarea on events during Barbarian attacks.
- Chapter 30: Epistle of Athanasius the Great to monk Amon, and another epistle regarding lawful books.
- Chapter 31: The rules from the epistle of Athanasius the Great to bishop Ruphinianus.
- Chapter 32: The speeches of Saint Gregory of Nazianzus and Amphilochius of Iconium on those lawful books.
- Chapter 33: The rules of Gregory of Nyssa given to the bishop of Mytilene (8 laws).
- Chapter 34: The rules of Saint Timothy (15 laws).
- Chapter 35: Theophilos of Alexandria on the Epiphany when it falls on a Sunday (14 laws).
- Chapter 36: The rules from epistles of Saint Cyril of Alexandria.
- Chapter 37: Cyril's rules about Orthodoxy, 12 chapters against Nestorius.
- Chapter 38: The rules from the epistle of Gennadios of Constantinople and the Holy Council to all bishops.
- Chapter 39: The rules from the epistle of the Council in Constantinople to Martyrius of Antioch, on how to accept heretics.
- Chapter 40: The rules of the great church Hagia Sophia, sealed with Justinian's golden stamp, regarding slaves who seek refuge in the church.
- Chapter 41: The rules of Demetrios of Cyzicus on Jacobites and Chatzitzarioi.
- Chapter 42: The rules about the Messalians now called Bogomils and Babuni.
- Chapter 43: The epistle of Peter of Antioch to the Venetian archbishop.
- Chapter 44: The epistle of beatified monk Nilos to priest Hariklios.
- Chapter 45: Collection of John Scholastikos in 87 chapters, with excerpts from Justinian's Novellae regarding church questions. The relation between church and state, the balance known as Symphonia, is included in this chapter.
- Chapter 46: Novellae of pious Alexios I Komnenos (35 laws), Novellae of Alexios I Komnenos from June 6592 presented by palace guard and judge Bardas.
- Chapter 47: Various laws, a branch of Justinian's Novellae.
- Chapter 48: Regulations of Moses' legislation.
- Chapters 49–54: The epistles of monk Niketas against the Latins, dispraise for introducing fasting on Saturdays (chapter 49), dispraise for introducing celibacy for the clergy and other novelties (50), about Franks and other Latins (51), followed by the faulty teachings of the Roman church.
- Chapter 55: Translation of the Procheiron, known in Serbian as Zakon gradski ("Urban law"). It is the oldest known Slavic translation of the work.
- Chapters 56–57: On forbidden and permitted marriages.
- Chapters 61–64: Articles about heresy, including Islam.

=== Church and state ===
In the Middle ages, Papal supremacy was characteristic of Catholic states, where the Pope stood above the monarch and even made decisions in the secular sphere. There was also the contrasting interpretation that the monarch's authority derived from divine grace, in which the monarch held an apostolic status and the church was treated as a state institution, known as Caesaropapism, found in Byzantium until the 9th century. After the Iconoclasm, the balance between the state and church stabilized into the Patriarch becoming a subject of the state, subordinated the emperor, and the emperor as a Christian, subordinated the Patriarch. This is known as Symphonia. The emperor was viewed of as a guardian of the church, and the church property was inviolable and the church court independent. Clergy could intervene for mercy, protect the poor from nobility and state organs. The Patriarch was the only one to crown the emperor, and at the same time could anathemize him. The Epanagoge of Basil I introduced Symphonia into law, with duties of the emperor towards the state and church, and those of the Patriarch as the ecclesiastical leader.

With the Zakonopravilo, Archbishop Sava laid the legal foundations for the Serbian state. The work was created for the autocephaly of the Serbian Church, independent from the Serbian state, in line with Symphonia which forms the basic thought of the Eastern Orthodox Church. Old laws that challenged Symphonia were not included in the work. Sava corrected wording from Nomocanon in 14 Titles to clarify a harmonious relationship between spiritual- and secular authority. The idea of Eastern Papism was dismissed, as it was anti-dogmatic, anti-canonical, and against the idea of autocephaly in the Orthodox Church. The laws from Ekloge ton nomon pertaining to this were not used as it was dismissed by the Athonite monks, Iconoclastic and had Caesaropapal characteristics.

=== Social justice, humanism and solidarity ===
Many laws were included to uphold social justice, to defend the poor, powerless and endangered social layers. The fourth introductory chapter includes promotion of equality and solidarity, while oppression is prohibited. Slavery still existed at the time. Christian social justice is emphasized and humanization of social relations.

Material security of the socially needing and property protection of elderly, ill and incompetent for work. Regular wage payment is stressed and forgiveness of debt is promoted. The "honorable homes", most often churches, served as social care institutions with kitchens, shelters and hospitals. Church edicts (ekdikesis) were chosen from prominent locals to represent the poor and protect them from abuse, while the poor could be excluded from testifying if it would endanger them. Prisoners and wounded are by obligation to be cared for by the entire community.

The family is of great importance, and Byzantine regulations speak of social obligations of parents and children, including that a parent who takes monastic oaths must ensure social security for his child, and vice versa, when the parent is old. The protection of the family was placed before Church interest.

Women are recognized as socially endangered due to their vulnerability as subordinate and weaker party in marriage, and thus regulations to protect them were institutionalized. A divorce warrants a dowry for the wife, prioritized over other debts the husband may have. Widows and poor unmarried girls are protected by special laws.

== Transcripts ==
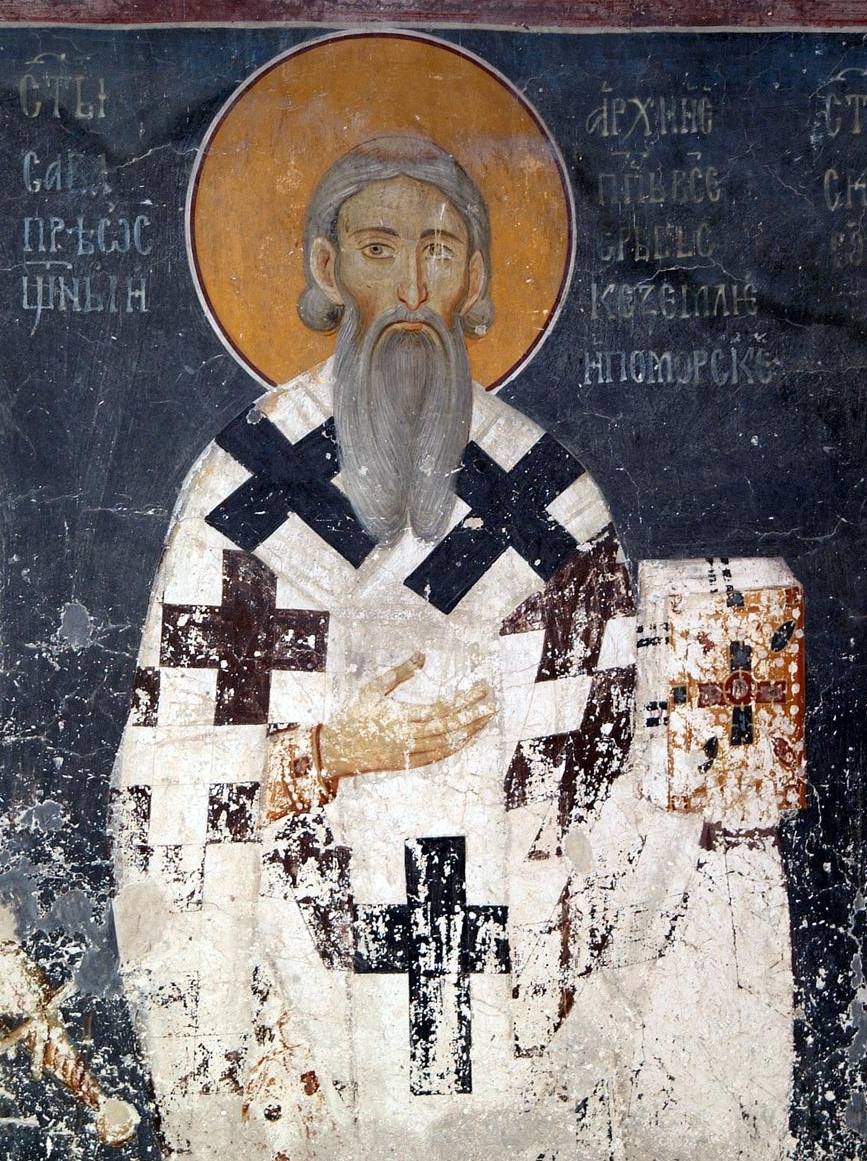
Fresco of Saint Sava, Studenica Monastery.

The original manuscript was held in Žiča, likely until the 1253 pillage by the Bulgarians and Cumans in the Serbian interior. None of the original bishop's manuscripts have survived. There are at least 11 (or 13) known Serbian Church Slavic transcripts of Zakonopravilo. They could be grouped into Teofil's copies, Dragutin's era, and Russian transcripts. Among the notable transcripts of Zakonopravilo are:

- Teofil's Transcript (Teofilov prepis), dated to 1252, in the ownership of Teofil, the bishop of Budimlja. It is a lost work which according to Troicki is the direct or indirect origin of the Ilovica, Sarajevo, Hilandar and Mileševa transcripts.
- Ilovica Transcript (Ilovički prepis), dated to 1262. It was written at the Monastery of Holy Archangel Michael in Prevlaka, which was the bishopric seat of Zeta. It was written on the request of bishop Neofit. It consists of 398 parchment pages, while some of the original pages are lost. The first 53 pages were transcribed by an unknown Russian monk from Novgorod who used some Russian terms, while the rest of the work was transcribed by monk-scribe Bogdan of the Raška School, who was helped by the Russian monk. The work was stolen and transferred to Zagreb during World War II, and is held at the library of the Croatian Academy of Sciences and Arts.
- Raška Transcript (Raški prepis), dated to 1295–1305 or 1305. It was written at the Church of Peter and Paul in Stari Ras, on parchment and it contains 427 pages. It was started in 1295 by bishop Georgije at Hilandar and then finished in Raška, and was transcribed from Teolfil's transcript. It is held at the Moscow State Historical Museum. It likely ended up in Russia in the 1640s with migrations.
- Sarajevo Transcript (Sarajevski prepis), dated to late 13th- or first third of 14th century. Of unknown origin, named after the Old Church in Sarajevo where it has been held for at least three centuries.
- Dečani Transcript (Dečanski prepis), dated to c. 1340 or the beginning of the 14th century. It was written at the Visoki Dečani monastery. It was transcribed from a 1270s copy. It has 284 pages and resides in the library of Dečani Monastery.
- Pčinja Transcript (Pčinjski prepis), dated to c. 1360 or 1360–1370. It has leather binding and consists of 305 pages and resides in the Serbian Academy of Science and Arts. It was collected by Miloš Milojević in Old Serbia. It was likely written at the Monastery of St. Prohor Pčinjski which was an important transcription center.
- Hilandar Transcript (Hilandarski prepis), dated to 1360s. It has 348 pages. It was held at Hilandar until 1682. It is now held at the Viennese National Library.
- Belgrade Transcript (Beogradski prepis), dated to c. 1470. It has 369 pages. It was found by Stanislav Krakov.
- Mileševa Transcript (Mileševski prepis), dated to c. 1295, but the original by crnorizac German of Mileševa has not survived. In the first fourth of the 16th century, this manuscript was transcribed into a book of 322–323 pages which is now held at the Romanian Academy of Sciences in Bucharest.
- Savina Transcript (Savinski prepis), dated to c. 1510 or 1535–1545. It has 399 pages and the entry on the last page tells that Metropolitan Silvestar of Herzegovina donated it to the Tvrdoš Monastery in Trebinje in 1603, from where it was saved from the Ottomans in 1693 by fleeing monks and taken to the Savina Monastery (Montenegro) where it is held still today.
- Peć Transcript (Pećki prepis), dated to 1552. It was transcribed from an original dated to Dragutin's reign. It has 421 pages and is held at the Serbian Academy of Science and Arts. Named after the Patriarchate of Peć.
- Morača Transcript (Morački prepis), dated to 1615. It was written by hegumen Gavrilo of the Morača Monastery, based on Teofil's Transcript. It consists of 347 or 358 paper pages and resides in the Museum of the Serbian Orthodox Church. It was found by Nićifor Dučić in 1865.

== Legacy ==
The Nomocanon of St. Sava shaped legislation among the medieval Slavic peoples, and has been dubbed the ultimate civil and canon law source for Slavs in the Middle ages and following centuries. The work is regarded one of the most important books of Serb cultural tradition.

The work included many civil laws that regulated life in the state. The work organized the Serbian Church but did not have such an importance in state regulation as it did not adress the status of dependent social categories, judicial responsibility and procedure, status of the nobility, etc. Today, the Zakonopravilo is an official legal code of the Serbian Orthodox Church.

In Dušan's Code (1349), articles 6, 8, 11, 101, 109 and 196 were adopted from- and directly refer to the Zakonopravilo. It was also referred to in Lazar's charters from 1380 and 1382, and other legal acts. In the Ottoman period, after the resurrection of the Serbian Church (1557), the Zakonopravilo was still used as the legal code, and was referred to in interpersonal conflicts.

=== Usage in other Churches ===
The Zakonopravilo was used also in Russia and Bulgaria in the 13th century, and later in Romania. In 1226, the work was adopted as the general binding compendium in Bulgaria.

In 1262, the Metropolitan of Kiev, Kiril II, requested from Bulgarian despot Jacob Svetoslav to send the Serbian Zakonopravilo, instead of the Bulgarian church code. In Russia, the Nomocanon in 14 titles, without commentary, was used since the 11th century, and it was replaced with the improved nomocanon of St. Sava, as it was updated and included commentary and translations of Aristenos and Zonaras, among others. The Zakonopravilo was accepted at the 1274 church assembly in Vladimir. One of the notable Russian transcripts is the Ryazan Kormchaia of 1284 which has survived, and it is virtually identical to the Ilovica and Raška transcripts. The "Russian redactions" of the Zakonopravilo are the Uvarovski (1444), Voskresenjski (1522), Novgorod-Sofia (1552) and Lavovski (1599) which are collectively known as the Kormchaia Kniga. The Zakonopravilo was published as a book in 1650, and since then, in many editions. Alexis of Russia (r. 1645–1676) used the Zakonopravilo for the state's legal codification, and the work was replaced in the Russian Church only with the Book of Laws (Russia) (c. 1839).

=== Zeta and Montenegro ===
A short codex of only seven articles based on the Zakonopravilo and Dušan's Code was written between 1486 and 1490 in Zeta under the Crnojević, known as the Imperial and Patriarchal Law (Суд Царски и Патријаршијски) or Law of Ivan Crnojević (Суд Ивана Црнојевића). Montenegrin metropolitan Petar I Petrović-Njegoš made a Codex of 33 lines (Законик у 33 пункта).

=== Podunavlje Codex ===
The Codex of Podunavlje was a draft that did not gain legal power. Nevertheless, it expressed an eternal need of Serbs to arrange state relations legally. Serbs from Podunavlje used Krmčija as a source for their own codex. This codex originally had 27 unnumbered articles. The numbering was done by Aleksandar Solovjev, who prepared the edition of the codex and wrote both a juridical and historical commentary on it, in the Glas ('Voice') of the Serbian Academy of Sciences and Arts. In the sixteenth article it is mentioned that some parts of the codex were taken from Zakon sudnji ljudem, Zakon gradski (Procheiron) and Sud cara Leona i Konstantina (Ekloge). Its laws were already a part of Krmčija but the articles were altered. It was written in the vernacular with the exception of some lines in Church Slavonic. Pavle Šafarik acquired the manuscript soon before leaving Novi Sad in 1831. It is now kept in his manuscript collection in National Museum of Prague.

=== Serbian Revolution ===
The Russian published version of 1653 was used by the Serbs, and the Russian-derived term Krmčija was adopted. During the First Serbian Uprising (1804–1813), the Russian published edition of Zakonopravilo and the Ilovica and Morača transcripts, alongside the Procheiron, were used by the Serbian revolutionaries; in 1804, priest Mateja Nenadović adopted articles for a legal code that was in use in the Valjevo nahija. In 1844, the Zakonopravilo is mentioned as a source for marital law in the Serbian Civil Code.

== See also ==
- Medieval Serbian law
- Serbian manuscripts
- Medieval Serbian literature

== Annotations ==
1. It is known mainly by three names, the Serbian-derived Zakonopravilo (which is the original name used by Sava himself), the Greek-derived Nomocanon (Номоканон светог Саве), and the Russian-derived Krmčija (Крмчија). The term Krmčija was introduced from Russia in the 18th century.

== Sources ==
- Bjelajac, Željko; Filipović, Aleksandar (September 2019). "Nomokanon: teološko - zakonodavno učenje Svetog Save u senci Magnae Cartae Libertatum" [Nomokanon: Theological and Legislative Teachings of Saint Sava in the Shadow of Magna Carta Libertatum]. Kultura polisa. 16: 95–106 – via ResearchGate.
- Bojanin, Stanoje (2023). "Canons of Old Nomokanons in South Slavonic Penitentials (13th–14th Centuries)". Иницијал. 11: 71–92 – via DAIS SANU.
- Čvorović, Zoran (2023). "The reception of St. Sava's Zakonopravilo in Russia". Synaxa. 12–13: 93–106 – via CEEOL.
- Jelesijević, Snežana V. (2024). "СПОМЕНИЦИ РАНИХ ИСТОЧНОСЛОВЕНСКО-СРПСКИХ КЊИЖЕВНИХ ВЕЗА КАО ИЗВОРИ ЗА ПРОУЧАВАЊЕ СРПСКОГ ИДЕНТИТЕТА". Социолошки Преглед. 58 (4): 1015–1045.
- Koprivica, Marija (2020). "The political background to the establishment of the Slavic Nomocanon in the thirteenth century". Studies in Church History. 56: 78–92. doi:10.1017/stc.2019.5 – via ProQuest.
- Nikitović, Zorica (2023). "Хронологија (не) издавња Крмчије или Светосавског номоканона". Прилози Настави Српског Језика И Књижевности. XII: 145–187.
- Zorić, Petar (2006), Законоправило Светога Саве и правни транспланти (PDF) (in Serbian), Alan Watson, archived from the original (PDF) on September 30, 2011
