= Heraclides (bishop) =

Heraclides (Koine Greek: Ἡρακλείδης) was a native of Cyprus who served as a deacon under John Chrysostom. He had previously lived as a monk at Scetis and was a disciple of the monk Evagrius Ponticus. After the death of the bishop of Ephesus, John ordained Heraclides as bishop of that city.

Later, after John had been deposed by the council, Theophilus I of Alexandria received an accusation against Heraclides during the absence of the accused, in the hope of authorizing the sentence that had been issued against John. The friends of Heraclides opposed this, stating that it was unjust and contrary to ecclesiastical law to condemn a person who was absent. A dispute arose between those who supported Theophilus and those who opposed him, and the conflict became so violent that bloodshed occurred, with many wounded and some killed.

This occurred in the context of a wider persecution of John's supporters: Serapion, who had been consecrated bishop of Heraclea by John after his first return from exile, suffered cruel indignities and was deprived of his bishopric. Around twenty other bishops, together with a large number of priests, deacons, and laymen who were accused of favoring John, were also driven from their sees.
