= Hypatius of Ephesus =

Metropolitan of Ephesus

Hypatius of Ephesus (Greek: Ύπάτιος ό Εφέσιος; fl. c. 530) was the metropolitan of Ephesus from 531 to about 538. He campaigned against Monophysitism and cooperated with Emperor Justinian I on various ecclesiastical issues. He was an early opponent of the authenticity of Pseudo-Dionysius the Areopagite.
