= Bassianus (bishop) =

Bassianus was the Bishop of Ephesus (444–448).

As a priest of Ephesus, he was reportedly very popular, but his bishop, Memnon, is said to have sought his removal by promoting him to the Bishopric of Evaza due to jealousy. Bassianus repudiated the consecration to which he was violently forced to submit, an attitude approved by Memnon's successor, Basil. On the latter's death (444), Bassianus succeeded him and, though popular enthusiasm disregarded canonical procedure requiring the participation of three bishops to consecrate, his election was confirmed by Theodosius II and reluctantly by Archbishop Proclus of Constantinople. Bassianus reigned undisturbed for four years. At the Easter celebration in 448 he was seized by a mob and imprisoned. The emperor was importuned to remove him, and the case was referred to Pope Leo I and the Bishops of Constantinople, Alexandria and Antioch, who declared the election invalid.

Stephen, whom Bassianus called the ringleader of his opponents, was elected in his stead. The Council of Chalcedon, on 29 October 451, considered the plea of Bassianus for reinstatement and was disposed to favour him, but owing to the complex irregularities of the case it was deemed advisable to declare the see vacant. Bassianus and Stephen were retired on a pension with episcopal dignity. During the process, Stephen cited Pope Leo's letter deposing Bassianus, a document which has been lost.
