= Nomocanon in Fifty Titles =

- Original title: Synagoge
- Created: 550
- Date effective: 565–12th century
- Superseded: 12th century
- Location: Antioch (originally)
- Author: John Scholastikos
- Subject: Code
- Purpose: Nomocanon

The Nomocanon in Fifty Titles is an Eastern Christian nomocanon (collection of ecclesiastical law), or syntagma (a nomocanon without commentary), authored by Antiochian jurist John Scholastikos in the mid-6th century.

John Scholastikos compiled the work in Antioch prior to his ordination in c. 550.

The work is a compilation of canon law divided into 50 titles. It includes 85 Apostolic Canons, the Ecumenical councils and a number of local councils, and the 68 canons of Cappadocian bishop Basil of Caesarea (t. 370–379). Other canons known at the time were not included, such as the Greek translation of the African Code. It was in use until the 12th century.

It was translated into Old Slavic in the Nomocanon of Methodios, authored by Methodios between 865–885, which survived in the Russian-recension Church Slavonic 13/14th-century Ustiug Miscellany and the 16th-century Ioasafskaia Kormchaia. It was also used in the 13th-century Serbian nomocanon Zakonopravilo, dubbed the ultimate civil and canon law source for Slavs in the Middle ages and following centuries.

== See also ==
- Zakonopravilo, 13th-century Serbian nomocanon

== Annotations ==
1. It is known as Nomocanon in Fifty Titles and Synagoge of 50 Titles. In Serbian, it known as nomokanon (Номоканон Јована Схоластика) and sintagma (Синтагма Јована Схоластика).

== Sources ==
- Bojanin, Stanoje (2023). "Canons of Old Nomokanons in South Slavonic Penitentials (13th–14th Centuries)". Иницијал. 11: 71–92.
- Koprivica, Marija (2020). "The political background to the establishment of the Slavic Nomocanon in the thirteenth century". Studies in Church History. 56: 78–92. doi:10.1017/stc.2019.5 – via ProQuest.
- Miletić, Branko A. (2019). "Zakonopravilo Svetog Save (Svetosavski Nomokanon) i Zakonik Stefana Dušana (Dušanov Zakonik) kao izvori srpskog prava u srednjovekovnoj Srbiji" [Saint Sava Law (Nomocanon of Saint Sava) and Law of Stefan Dušan (Dušan's Code): Sources of law in medieval Serbia]. Zbornik radova Filozofskog fakulteta u Prištini. 49 (2): 155–174. doi:10.5937/ZRFFP49-20654.
