= Patriarch Eutychius =

Patriarch Eutychius may refer to:

- Eutychius of Constantinople (512–582), Patriarch of Constantinople and saint
- Eutychius of Alexandria (877–940), Greek Patriarch of Alexandria and historian
