= Palman =

German nobleman and knight (c. 1290–1363)

- Detail of Krunisanje Cara Dušana (Coronation of Tsar Dušan) by Paja Jovanović (1900).
- Born: ~1290; Duchy of Styria, Holy Roman Empire (modern Austria)
- Died: 1363+
- Military career
- Allegiance: Serbian Empire
- Service years: 1331-1355+
- Rank: Vitez (Knight)
- Units: Alemannic Guard (mercenaries), 300 Germans

Palman (Serbian Cyrillic: Палман, Latin: Palmanus; fl. 1310-1363) was a German noble (dominus), knight, and mercenary commander of the Alemannic Guard in the Serbian Imperial army of one of the most prolific European rulers of its time, Dušan the Mighty (r.1331–1355).

== Life ==
=== Origin and early life ===
Palman was born in ca. 1290, in Styria (present Austria), into a noble, Roman Catholic family. He had the facial condition of cleft lip and palate. Palman was brought up at the court of his father, and at 13 years he became a courts man. At 16 he became a squire (armiger) at the service of Henry III of Gorizia until 1310 when his father died and he returned to Styria and inherited all of the family holdings. He then served the House of Habsburg; one of the Dukes made Palman a knight during the marriage of his daughter. At 27 years, he operated his harelip in Venice, as he thought it would help him in getting his love, a countess back home who did not feel the same, however, it did not help. Broken hearted, he joined knight tournaments all over the Holy Roman Empire where he fought for several years, losing a finger. After returning, and still not having his love answered, he decided to leave for the Holy Land.

Palman and his entourage crossed into Zeta, a maritime province of the Serbian Kingdom, in hands of Young King (heir) Stephen Uroš IV Dušan, and decided to join his service as mercenaries.

=== Service in the Serbian Empire ===
Palman became the "captain of the Alemannic Guard", a mercenary unit under the direct hand of Dušan, consisting of him and his entourage (300 Germans). By January or February 1331, Dušan was quarreling with his father, King Stephen Uroš III, perhaps pressured by the nobility. According to contemporary pro-Dušan sources, evil advisors turned Uroš III against his son; he decided to seize and exclude Dušan of his inheritance. Uroš III sent an army into Zeta against his son, the army ravaged Skadar, but Dušan had crossed the Bojana. A brief period of anarchy in parts of Serbia took place before the father and son concluded peace in April 1331. Three months later, Uroš III ordered Dušan to meet him. Dušan feared for his life and his advisors persuaded him to resist, so Dušan, including Palman's army, marched from Skadar to Nerodimlje, where they besieged his father. Uroš III fled, and Dušan captured the treasury and family. Dušan then pursued his father, catching up with him at Petrić. On 21 August 1331, Uroš III surrendered, and on the advice or insistence of Dušan's advisors, he was imprisoned. Dušan is crowned King of All Serbian and Maritime lands in the first week of September. Palman too, had his title elevated.

Next he suppressed revolts in Zeta, by Bogoje, and in Serbian holdings of northern Albania, where he sent his nephew through his sister, Đorđe (Georg) with a band of the mercenaries.

In ca. 1336, it was decided that Dušan would divorce Jelena, his wife, as she had not yet given birth to an heir. At the same time, talks began with Austrian Duke Otto V, that his niece, German King Frederick the Fair's daughter Elizabeth be married to Dušan. Austrian delegates arrived at Kotor, in maritime Serbia, in the spring. The mediator of the matter was Palman. Elizabeth, whom they did not ask for consent, was appalled by the thought that she was pushed into the unknown world, to marry a King of a different faith, who already was married. She became acute anxious and died. When Queen Jelena heard of the potential divorce, she hurried to conceive, and promised a son, as to calm Dušan. Indeed, in the winter, Jelena became pregnant with a son.

When Dušan forged an alliance with the Byzantine fugitive John Cantacuzene and when it was agreed that both of them conquer Byzantine territory, Dušan took Veria, an important city in Thrace. As a security measure, Palman's army was sent to hold the town. However, Cantacuzene later that year deceived Dušan and recovered Veria, he allowed Palman's troops to leave the city safe while he kept the city's Serbs as hostages.

In March 1355, a papal delegate led by bishop Peter Thomas arrived in Serbia in a mission to convert Serbs into Catholicism (the Serbs hoped to get help from the Papal state to organize a Crusade against Ottoman Turks), and Dušan, who was angry with Louis I of Hungary, prohibited the Catholics in his army to join the sermon of the papal bishop. Upon hearing that German mercenaries joined a sermon, Dušan became enraged, but regained his composure soon thereafter, when their commander, Palman, said that they would defend their faith, not only by accepting punishment but even by clashing against Dušan's Imperial Army, if need be. The papal bishop, irritated with the failure of his mission, turned home and on the way visited Louis I, asking him to furiously continue the war on Serbia.

In 1355 his unit was sent by Dušan to garrison the town of Klis (in the realm of Jelena, his sister) due to Croatian vassals to Hungary were advancing to Klis and Skradin. After the death of Dušan in 1355, he worked for Teodora. In 1363 he was a beneficiary of a will in Dubrovnik.

== Legacy ==
He is enumerated in Serbian epic poetry, alongside his brother Kijaran (Chiarane), and nephew Đorđe (Georg).

== Annotations ==
1. Name: He is mentioned as "Palman(us) Teutonicus Capitanus gentis armigens". His name has been given as Palman Bracht (Палман Брахт).

== Notes ==
Military offices
Preceded by Unknown	Voivode of the Allemannic Guard of Dušan the Mighty; 1331 – 1355+	Succeeded by Unknown
