= Nomocanon =

Collection of ecclesiastical law in Eastern Christian tradition

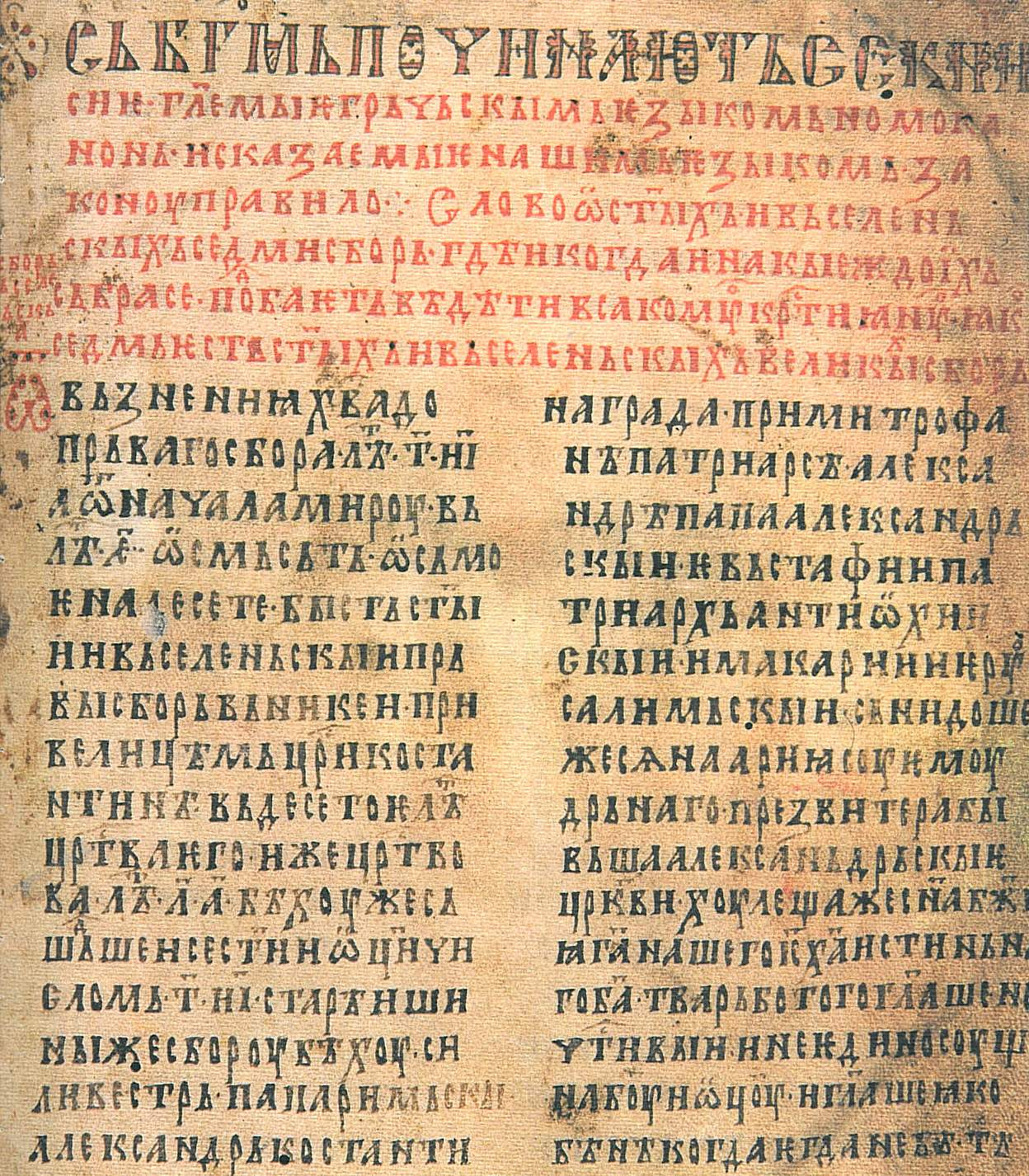
The Nomocanon of St. Sava, a compilation of Byzantine nomocanons and codes, came to shape the legislation among Orthodox Slavs.

A nomocanon (Greek: Νομοκανών, Nomokanōn; from the Greek nomos 'law' and kanon 'a rule') is a collection of ecclesiastical law, consisting of the elements from both the civil law and the canon law. Nomocanons form part of the canon law of the Eastern Orthodox Church, and the formerly Orthodox now Eastern Catholic churches.

== Byzantine nomocanons ==
=== Nomocanon in Fifty Titles ===
The Antiochian jurist John Scholastikos compiled the Nomocanon in Fifty Titles prior to his ordination in c. 550; it was a compilation of canon law divided into 50 titles which was in use until the 12th century. Scholastikos' other collection, from Justinian's Novellae in 87 Titles, was included into one collection in the second half of the 6th century.

=== Nomocanon in Fourteen Titles ===
The Canonical Syntagma, a Church journal compiled during the reign of Patriarch Sergius (t. 610–638), was coupled with the Collectio tripartita compilation of Justinian's laws by the jurist Julian in the early 7th century to become the Nomocanon in Fourteen Titles, later revised in 883 and declared an official legal document of the Eastern Church in 920.

=== Nomocanon of Photios ===
The Nomocanon in 14 titles was long held in esteem and passed into the Russian Church, but it was by degrees supplanted by the Nomocanon of Photios in 883.

The great systematic compiler of the Eastern Church, who occupies a similar position to that of Gratian in the West, was Photius, Patriarch of Constantinople in the 9th century. His collection in two parts—a chronologically ordered compilation of synodical canons and a revision of the Nomocanon—formed and still forms the classic source of ancient Church Law for the Greek Church.

It contained the Nomocanon in 14 titles, with the addition of 102 canons of Trullan Council, 17 canons of the Council of Constantinople of 861, and three canons substituted by Photios for those of the Council of Constantinople of 869. The Nomocanon in 14 titles was completed with the more recent imperial laws.

This whole collection was commented on about 1170 by Theodore Balsamon, Greek Patriarch of Antioch residing at Constantinople. The Nomocanon of Photios supplemented the Pedalion (Greek: Πηδάλιον 'rudder'), a sort of Corpus Juris of the Eastern Orthodox Church, printed in 1800 by Patriarch Neophytos VII.

The Nomocanon of Photios was retained in the law of the Eastern Orthodox Church and it was included in the Syntagma, published by Rallis and Potlis (Athens, 1852–1859).

== Slavic nomocanons ==
The Slavic collections of nomocanons are also known as Kormchaia (Russian: Ко́рмчая).

With the Christianization of Slavs, the first translations of Greek nomocanons into Old Slavic were made by Methodios in 865–885. The Nomocanon of Methodius was based on the nomocanon of John Scholasticus, and the compilation also included a secular part, Zakon Sudnyi Liudem ("Court Law for the People"), which was based on the 8th-century Ekloge ton nomon. This first Slavic nomocanon was used in Bulgaria, which became increasingly politically strong in the late 9th and 10th centuries. After the Byzantine reconquest of the Balkans, the Slavic nomocanon was suppressed. In the Kievan Rus, however, manuscripts of this Slavic nomocanon survived, most importantly in the Efremovskaia Kormchaia from the 12th (or late 11th) century. The early Slavic nomocanons had the intention to regulate religious life of the baptized Slavs and also subject them to secular Byzantine law. At this time, the Balkan Slavs worked on establishing their own autonomous churches with Slavic liturgy.

The Nomocanon of St. Sava shaped legislation among the medieval Slavic peoples, and has been dubbed the ultimate civil and canon law source for Slavs in the Middle Ages and following centuries.

=== Nomocanon of St. Sava ===
The Nomocanon of St. Sava, known by its original name Zakonopravilo, was the first Serbian constitution and the highest code in the Serbian Orthodox Church; it was finished in 1219. This legal act was well developed. St. Sava's Nomocanon was the compilation of civil law, based on Roman law and canon law, based on ecumenical councils. Its basic purpose was to organize functioning of the young Serbian kingdom and the Serbian church. During the Nemanjić dynasty (1166–1371) rulers of the Serbian medieval state could not create code of laws, which would regulate the relations in the state and church. Serbian rulers reigned with single legal acts and decrees. In order to overcome this problem and organize legal system, after acquiring religious independence, Saint Sava finished his Zakonopravilo in 1219.

The Zakonopravilo was accepted in Bulgaria, Romania and Russia. It was printed in Moscow in the 17th century. So, Roman-Byzantine law was transplanting among East Europe through the Zakonopravilo. In Serbia, it was considered as the code of the divine law and it was implemented into Dušan's Code (Serbian: Dušanov zakonik).

During the Serbian Revolution, in 1804, the priest Mateja Nenadović established the Nomocanon of Saint Sava as the code of the liberated Serbia. It was also implemented in Serbian civil code in 1844. The Zakonopravilo is still used in the Serbian Orthodox Church as the highest church code.

== Syriac nomocanons ==
Nomocanons of the East-Syriac Rite (Church of the East):

- Composition on the Laws, 8th-century Persian-language East-Syriac nomocanon of Ishoʿbokht
- Collection of Judgements, 9th-century Syriac-language East-Syriac nomocanon of Gabriel of Basra (fl. 884–893)
- Nomocanon Arabicus, 10th-century Arabic-language East-Syriac nomocanon of Eliya ibn ʿUbaid (fl. 878–903)
- Law of Christianity, 11th-century Arabic-language East-Syriac nomocanon of Ibn al-Ṭayyib (d. 1043)
- Nomocanon of Abdisho of Nisibis, 14th-century East-Syriac nomocanon of bishop Abdisho bar Berika (d. 1318)

Nomocanons of the West-Syriac Rite:

- Kthobo d-Hudoye ("Book of Directions") or Huddāyē, 13th-century Syriac Orthodox nomocanon of maphrian Gregory Bar Hebraeus (d. 1286)

== See also ==
- Kormchaia

== Sources ==
- Bojanin, Stanoje (2021). "The Byzantine Penitential Nomocanon in the Serbian and South Slavic Early Modern Printed and Manuscript Book" (PDF). Byzanz und das Abendland VII. Studia Byzantino-Occidentalia. Budapest: Eötvös József Collegium. pp. 31–49. Archived from the original (PDF) on 2025-03-01.
- Čvorović, Zoran (2023). "The reception of St. Sava's Zakonopravilo in Russia". Synaxa. 12–13: 93–106 – via CEEOL.
- Koprivica, Marija (2020). "The political background to the establishment of the Slavic Nomocanon in the thirteenth century". Studies in Church History. 56: 78–92. doi:10.1017/stc.2019.5 – via ProQuest.
- Šarkić, Srđan (2023). "The Influence of Byzantine Law in East Central Europe". Lectures on East Central European Legal History (2 ed.). CEA: 43–71.
