= Euaza =

Town during the Hellenic, Roman and Byzantine era

Euaza, located in what is modern Turkey was a town during the Hellenic, Roman and Byzantine era. The town was in the upper portion of the Cayster River valley, about 100 km east from Ephesus. The town also known as Augaza, appears in Notitiea episcopatuum of the 9th century. The area is still mainly agricultural.

== Location ==
The exact site of Euaza is still unknown save that it was in the upper reaches of the Cayster River valley. Some speculation holds it in the area of Dioshieron and Kolophốn, and was probably in the region of Mount Tmolus.

Zgusta, argues it was located at the city of Algizea in Caria, but being outside the provence of Asia makes this identification problematic.

Arnold Hugh Martin Jones called Evaza a "wretched little town" based on the "case of Bassianos" who Jones feels was banished to this insignificant place in the hills behind Ephesus, the metropolis.

== Name ==
The town was known as Euaza (Εὔαζα), Augaza (Αὔγαζα) Eugaza and latter Theodosioupolis (Θεοδοσιούπολις).

== Bishopric ==
The Diocese of Euaza (Dioecesis Euazsensis) is a suppressed and titular see of the Roman Catholic Church, located in the ancient episcopal see of the Roman province of Asia. It was part of the Patriarchate of Constantinople and was suffragan of the Archdiocese of Ephesus .

There are five known bishops of Euaza.

- Eutropio attended the Council of Ephesus of 431 .
- Bassett was elected bishop, probably after the death of Eutropius, but refused to take possession of the office; then he intrigued to become archbishop of Ephesus, a post from which he was deposed during the Council of Chalcedon.
- Olimpio was part of the Second Council of Ephesus in 449 and was among the signatories of the Council of Chalcedon in 451 .
- Gregory was present at the council in Trullo of 692 .
- Nicodemus was present at the Second Council of Nicaea in 787.

Today Euaza survives as titular bishopric which so far has never been assigned.
