= Stephen of Ephesus =

Bishop of Ephesus (448–451)

Stephen of Ephesus (fl. 448–451) was a bishop of Ephesus, an attendee of the Second Council of Ephesus and the Council of Chalcedon. Stephen became a presbyter in the city of Ephesus about 400 AD and then bishop in 448 AD. He was a staunch rival of his predecessor Bassianus and, as Bassianus himself had done four years earlier, usurped the episcopal see of Ephesus by force. In 448 he threw Bassianus without a trial into prison.

== Council of Ephesus ==
As a member of the Robber Council of 449 Stephen signed all its resolutions and declared Eutyches orthodox. This by no means proves that he was a convinced Monophysite. He may have been siding with the most powerful party out of ambition no more than all the other bishops present. The only difference is that he was one of the few leaders and as such much more responsible for his actions than the average participant.

== Council of Chalcedon ==
To defend his claim to the episcopal seat, Stephen addressed the Council of Chalcedon in 451, though his reputation was sorely questioned by the council. Stephen was closely examined on his role at the Council of Ephesus and asked to provide records of the discussions there. He replied that he signed the Council document under duress and that records were not preserved. The Council did not accept his defenses.

Bassianus and Stephen were then both retired on a pension with episcopal dignity and an annual maintenance of 200 gold pieces, the council having found the behavior of both bishops unworthy of their seat.

== Seven Sleepers of Ephesus ==
The origin of the story of the Seven Sleepers of Ephesus is still an open question. Ernst Honigmann has postulated that it was Stephen of Ephesus who commissioned or even redacted himself the original of this story, to increase the presage of the bishopric in Ephesus.
