= John Scholasticus =

Patriarch of Constantinople from 565 to 577

- Patriarch of Constantinople
- Installed: 12 April 565
- Term ended: 31 August 577
- Predecessor: Eutychius of Constantinople
- Successor: Eutychius of Constantinople

Personal details
- Born: c. 503 Sirimis, Cynegia, near Antioch
- Died: 31 August 577
- Denomination: Chalcedonian Christianity

John Scholasticus or Scholastikos (Greek: Ἰωάννης Γ' ό Σχολαστικός, romanized: Iōánnēs ho Scholastikós; c. 503 – 31 August 577) was patriarch of Constantinople from 12 April 565 until his death on 31 August 577. He is also regarded as a saint of the Eastern Orthodox Church.

== Life ==
He was born at Sirimis, in the region of Cynegia, near Antioch. There was a flourishing college of lawyers at Antioch, where he entered and did himself credit. This was suppressed in 533 by Emperor Justinian I. John was ordained and became agent and secretary of his church. This would bring him into touch with the court at Constantinople. When Justinian I, towards the close of his life, tried to raise the sect of the Aphthartodocetae to the rank of Orthodoxy and determined to expel Patriarch Eutychius of Constantinople for his opposition, the able lawyer-ecclesiastic of Antioch, who had already distinguished himself by his great edition of the canons, was chosen to carry out the imperial will.

He was also credited for methodical classification of Canon law, the Digest of Canon Law. Following some older work which he mentions in his preface, he abandoned the historical plan of giving the decrees of each council in order and arranged them on a philosophical principle, according to their matter. The older writers had sixty heads, but he reduced them to fifty.

To the canons of the councils of Nicaea, Ancyra, Neocaesarea, Gangra, Antioch, Ephesus, and Constantinople, already collected and received in the Greek church, John added 89 "Apostolic Canons", the 21 of Sardica, and the 68 of the canonical letter of Basil. Writing to Photius I of Constantinople, Pope Nicholas I cites a harmony of the canons which includes those of Sardica, which could only be that of John. When John came to Constantinople, he edited the Nomocanon, an abridgment of his former work, with the addition of a comparison of the imperial rescripts and civil laws (especially the Novels of Justinian) under each head. Theodore Balsamon cites this without naming the author, in his notes on the first canon of the Quinisext Council. In an MS. of the Paris library, the Nomocanon is attributed to Theodoret, but in all others to John. Theodoret would not have inserted the "apostolical canons" and those of Sardica, and the style has no resemblance to his. In 1661 these two works were printed at the beginning of vol. II of the Bibliotheca Canonica of Justellus, at Paris, Photius (Cod. lxxv.) mentions his catechism, in which he established the teaching of the consubstantial Trinity, saying that he wrote it in 568, under Emperor Justin II and that it was afterwards attacked by the impious John Philoponus. Johann Albert Fabricius considers that the Digest or Harmony and the Nomocanon are probably rightly assigned to John.

Little is known of his episcopal career. Seven months after his appointment Justinian I died. The new emperor, Justin II, was crowned by the patriarch, on 14 November 565.

He organized a compromise between the Chalcedonians and Non-Chalcedonians in 567, and temporarily reunited the two sects in 571.

John died shortly before Justin II in 577.

== Original citations ==
Johann Albert Fabricius, xi, 101; xii, 146, 193, 201, 209; Evagrius Scholasticus, H. E., iv, 38, v. 13, Patrologia Graeca lxxxvi, pt. 2; Theophanes the Confessor Chronogr. 204, Patrologia Graeca, cviii; Nikephoros Kallistos Xanthopoulos, iii, 455; Patrologia Graeca, cxlvii; Victor of Tunnuna, Patrologia Latina, lxviii, 937; Caesar Baronius, ad. ann., 564; xiv, xxix, 565; xvii, 578; 5, Patr. Constant, in Acta Sanctorum August, I, p. * 67.

== See also ==
- Nomocanon in Fifty Titles

== Notes and references ==
=== Attribution ===
Titles of Chalcedonian Christianity
Preceded by Eutychius	Patriarch of Constantinople; 565 – 577	Succeeded by Eutychius (2)
