= Metropolis of Ephesus =

Vacant ecclesiastical diocese in Anatolia

The Metropolis of Ephesus (Greek: Μητρόπολις Εφέσου) was an ecclesiastical territory (metropolis) of the Ecumenical Patriarchate of Constantinople in western Asia Minor, modern Turkey. Christianity was introduced already in the city of Ephesus in the 1st century AD by Paul the Apostle. The local Christian community comprised one of the seven churches of Asia mentioned in the Book of Revelation. The metropolis remained active until 1922–1923.

== History ==
=== Early Christianity ===
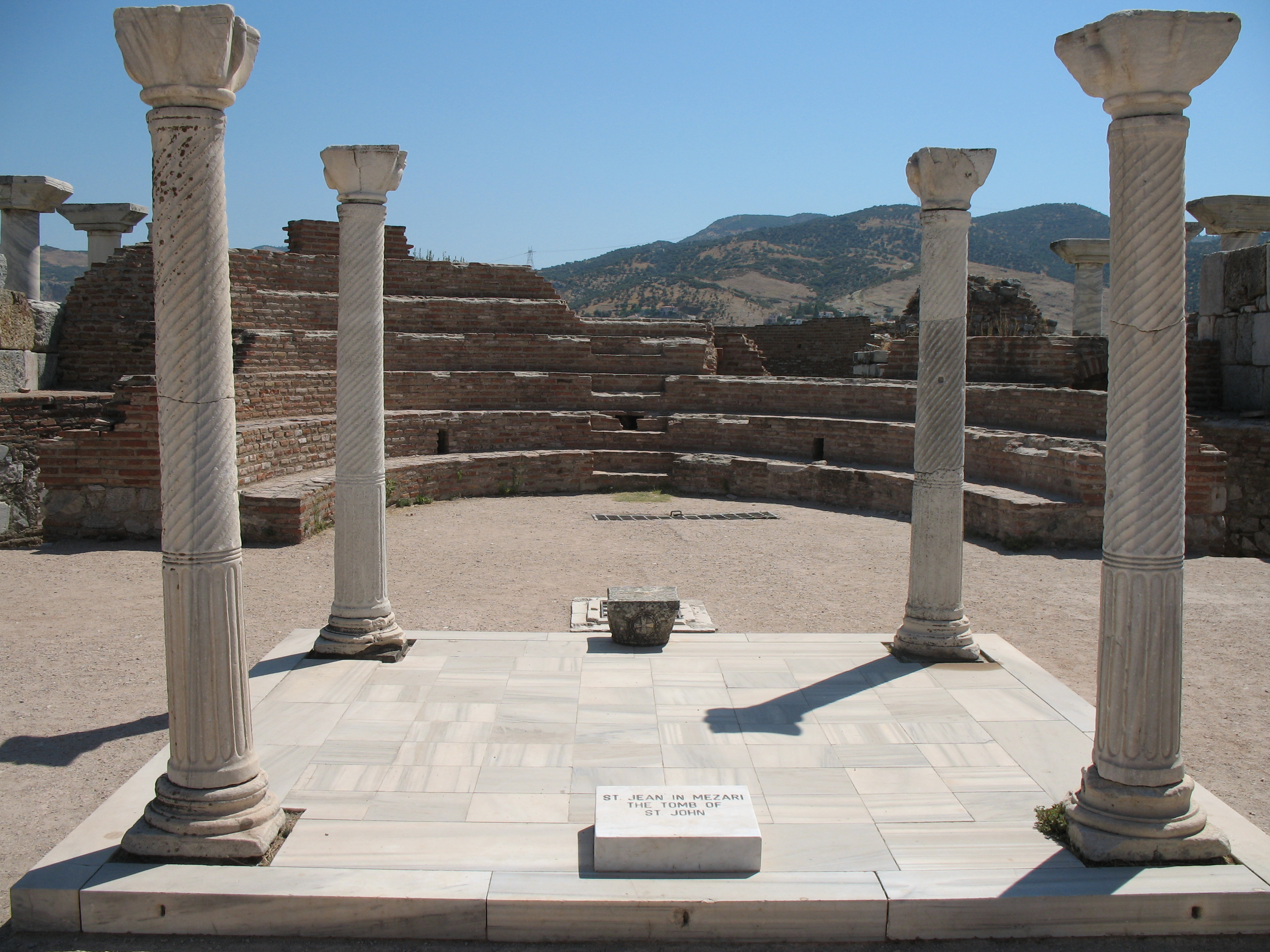
The tomb of Apostle John in the ruins of Ephesus.

There had been a Jewish community at Ephesus for over three hundred years when Paul the Apostle visited Ephesus around 53 AD. Paul set out on his third missionary journey in 54 AD. He spent three months teaching in a synagogue in an effort to bring the Jews to accept union with the gentiles in Christianity, but without success. For the next two years he stayed in Ephesus seeking to convert Hellenized Jews and gentiles, and appears to have made many converts.

The Apostle John (4 BC - 100 AD) was traditionally said to have come to Ephesus during the period when Agrippa I (37–44) was suppressing the church of Jerusalem. There are records of John being arrested by the Emperor Domitian (reigned 81-96 AD). He was released late in his life and returned to Ephesus, where it is traditionally thought that he wrote his Gospel. Tradition also says that Mary the mother of Jesus lived in Ephesus near to John. Apollos, a Jew from Alexandria who was a disciple of John the Baptist, arrived in Ephesus and met with Aquila and Priscilla.

Christian canon identifies the Epistle to the Ephesians as a letter to the church in Ephesus, and John mentions the church as one of the seven churches of Asia in the Book of Revelation. In Revelation (2:1–3), the church's perseverance, scrutiny toward alleged apostles and hatred of the Nicolatians are lauded, but the church is said to have "left its first love," to which Revelation calls on it to return.

Based on these traditions, it is generally believed that the city hosted a significant Christian community already from the 1st and 2nd centuries. Ephesus was associated with the lives of several saints of that era, such as the Philip the Evangelist, brother of the Apostle Barnabas, Hermione, Aristobulus, Paul of Thebes, Adauctus and his daughter, Callisthene. It is also thought that Mary Magdalene also lived there. Moreover, according to the Christian tradition, the first bishop of Ephesus was Apostle Timothy, student of the Apostle Paul.

Until the 4th century AD, Christianity and Paganism co-existed in the city, but Christianity became the dominant religion in Ephesus in the course of time. This is mainly evident from the conversion of religious monuments, the increased use of Christian symbols, as well as the destruction of various pagan places of worship. The apostle John has his grave in Ephesus.

Polycrates of Ephesus (Greek: Πολυκράτης) was a bishop at Ephesus in the 2nd century. He is best known for his letter addressed to the Pope Victor I, Bishop of Rome, defending the Quartodeciman position in the Easter controversy.

=== Late antiquity ===
After the First Council of Nicaea (325) and the organization of the ecclesiastical administration in the Roman provinces, Ephesus became the see of a metropolis, with the new metropolitan elected by the bishops of his province. The early organization of the Church paralleled that of the Roman state, and as Ephesus was the most important city of the province of Asia, its bishops became "Metropolitans of Asia", a title that remained in use long after the province itself had ceased to exist.

Based on the importance of their see, the metropolitans of Ephesus claimed a regional authority far beyond the borders of its own ecclesiastical province, encompassing most of Asia Minor, but this ambition was challenged by the rise of the Patriarchate of Constantinople, a process cemented by one of the canons of the Second Ecumenical Council of 381 AD that gave the bishop of Constantinople precedence over all other bishops other than the bishop of Rome. Although Ephesian ambitions were backed by Constantinople's rival, the Patriarchate of Alexandria, at the Council of Chalcedon in 451 its claims suffered a decisive blow. The bishop of neighbouring Smyrna, who had been subordinate to Ephesus and its major local rival for pre-eminence in the province of Asia, became an autocephalous archbishop, while Ephesus itself was demoted to second rank among the sees subject to Constantinople, after Caesarea in Cappadocia. These were major setbacks, which the award of the title of "Exarch of the Diocese of Asia" to the metropolitans of Ephesus could not ameliorate.

In the 5th century, the metropolis was involved in various ecclesiastical disputes. The First Council of Ephesus was held in 431 AD, and the Second Council of Ephesus, sometimes called the "Robber Council", was held in 449 AD. Cyril, Patriarch of Alexandria presided at the First Council, which was called by the Emperor Theodosius II to resolve the Nestorian controversy. Memnon, the Bishop of Ephesos, supported Cyril in condemning the archbishop of Constantinople, Nestorius, for heresy. The trial was held hastily, before the eastern supporters of Nestorius could arrive. When the eastern delegation led by John of Antioch arrived they were scandalized at what had happened and held their own trial. They found Cyril and Memnon guilty and imprisoned them, drawing a stern rebuke from the Emperor. Cyril bribed government officials to regain his position. Two years later, John and Cyril came to a mutual agreement which temporarily resolved the dispute, until Pope Dioscorus I of Alexandria, the Champion of Orthodoxy, convened the Second Council of Ephesus.

In 475 the Miaphysite Patriarch of Alexandria, Timothy (457–477), supported by Emperor Basiliscus (475–476), restored the Miaphysite Paul as Metropolitan of Ephesus during the council convened in Ephesus, which dealt with the issue of accepting the Miaphysite circular of Basiliscus. Patriarch Akakios of Constantinople (472–489) refused to accept these decisions and forced the Emperor to annul them. The bishops of the Diocese of Asia had to renounce the decisions of that council, while the metropolitan of Ephesus, Paul, was deposed during the reign of Emperor Zeno.

Among the most important metropolitans of 6th-century Ephesus were Hypatius (c. 530) and John. The former launched a campaign against Monophysitism and closely cooperated with Emperor Justinian I (527–565) on various ecclesiastical issues. On the other hand, the Miaphysite metropolitan John was a significant missionary, who preached in the city of Ephesus as well as in the nearby valley of the Meander River and Sardis. By permission of Emperor Justinian I he converted about 80,000 pagans to Christianity.

=== Middle and late Byzantine period ===
Ephesus continued to play an active role in various ecclesiastical disputes during the medieval period. When the Byzantine Iconoclasm dispute broke out (8th century), metropolitan Theodosius was an ardent advocate against the icons. However, a number of local clergymen refused to implement the official policy which condemned the worship of icons. This resulted in drastic measures by the state, including intervention of the army, under the general Michael Lachanodrakon, and massive expulsions of monks.

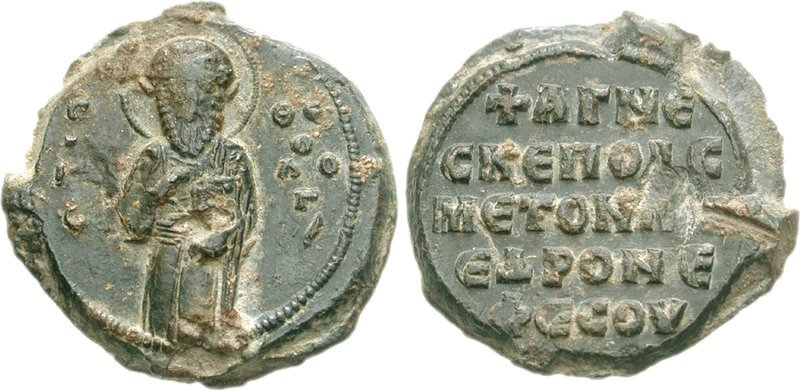
Seal of an anonymous proedros of the Metropolis of Ephesus, with St. John the Theologian on the obverse, 11th/12th century

In the following centuries the metropolis maintained its power in the ecclesiastical hierarchy. In the Notitiae Episcopatuum of the middle and late Byzantine period, Ephesus continued to rank second, after Caesarea, among the metropolis of the Patriarchate of Constantinople. In the second half of the 9th century, after the promotion of the autocephalous archbishopric of Smyrna to a separate metropolis, Ephesus lost control over three bishoprics: Phocaea, Magnesia ad Sipylum and Clazomenae, which came under the newly created metropolis. In the first half of the 11th century, the stylite Saint Lazaros lived on a column in the wilds of Mount Galesios, a few kilometers to the north of the city. The metropolitan paid little attention to the saint, and was often suspicious or outright hostile to him.

When the Emperor Michael VII Doukas was deposed in 1078, he was made bishop of Ephesus. After two years the city was captured by the Seljuk Turks, and he returned to Constantinople where he lived the remainder of his life. During the years after the fall of Constantinople to the Fourth Crusade (1204), the metropolis was part of the Empire of Nicaea. The Patriarchate of Constantinople was transferred to Nicaea at this time and this led to increased prestige for the metropolitans of Ephesus.

The Emperor of Nicaea, Theodore I Laskaris (1207/8-1222), married a Latin princess and in 1219 initiated negotiations over uniting the churches. The then Metropolitan of Ephesus, Nicholas Mesarites, was one of the main opponents to this policy. He was also very influential in the election of the Ecumenical Patriarchs. The local metropolitans were also involved in the Arsenite dispute, which concerned the issues raised after the deposition of Patriarch Arsenios in 1259.

Towards the end of the Laskarid dynasty's rule the church of Ephesus seems to have been wealthy. The metropolitan Nicephorus came to Nicaea in 1260 with a large amount of money and was elected as patriarch, although he died soon after.

=== Ottoman period ===
Greek-Orthodox metropoleis in Asia Minor, c. 1880.

Michael Louloudes was the last metropolitan of Ephesus before the Turks conquered the city in October 1304 or 1305. He escaped to Crete. The Turks converted the church of Saint John the Evangelist into a mosque. Despite this, due to its ancient prominence the Greek Orthodox Church hierarchy made extraordinary efforts to keep the see in existence. A new metropolitan, Matthew, was not elected until 1329, and it took ten years of fruitless attempts and bribery of the local emirs before he could actually take up residence in his see. After arriving in Ephesus he had to deal with the hostility of the new rulers, while all churches were already converted to mosques. Matthew was finally allowed to use a small chapel as his new cathedral. In 1368, the Ecumenical Patriarch issued a pronouncement uniting the metropolitan of Pyrgion with Ephesus "forever"; the document notes that the metropolitan of Ephesus had not been able for the previous three years to re-enter his church due to local hostility. But even this union did not prevent the metropolitan from further decline, and by 1387 the small community could not support even a small priest; as a result, the metropolitan was granted the sees of Pergamum, Clazomenae, and New Phocaea.

Similar difficulties were also faced by the 15th-century metropolitan Mark of Ephesus. (Note: Mark Eugenikos (c. 1394-1445), or Mark of Ephesus, was Metropolitan of Ephesus. He was a member of the Greek delegation at the Council of Ferrara-Florence to discuss reunion in 1438-1439. Mark was the main spokesman for the Orthodox delegates, was strongly opposed to any compromise with the Roman Catholics, and did much to prevent to union from taking place.)

As a result of the Ottoman conquest and subsequent introduction of Islam in the region in the 14th century, the local Christian element declined dramatically. This had a negative impact on the ecclesiastical administration, since conversions of the indigenous population—often by force—were on a large scale.

During the 16th century, the see of the metropolis moved to Teira (modern Tire), while probably during the late 17th century it was transferred to Magnesia ad Sipylum (modern Manisa). From the 17th century, as a result of the increase of the Greek Orthodox element in Anatolia, a number of new metropoleis were created and consequently the area of the Metropolis of Ephesus was reduced. Nevertheless, the jurisdiction of the diocese of Ephesus still included a vast area in western Anatolia and was divided into three metropolitan districts: Magnesia, Kordelio and Kydonies (modern Ayvalık).

In 1821, during the massacre that broke out in Constantinople, as a retaliation of the Greek War of Independence, the metropolitan bishop of Ephesus, Dionysios, was among the Greek Orthodox upper clergy that was executed by the Ottoman authorities.

At the beginning of the 20th century the area of the metropolis was further reduced with the creation of additional metropoleis, like that of Kydonies (1908) and Pergamon (1922). Most of the diocese became part of the Greek-controlled Smyrna Occupation Zone in 1919. However, due to the developments of the Greco-Turkish War of 1919–1922 the local Orthodox element evacuated the region in the Greek-Turkish population exchange.

== Known bishops ==
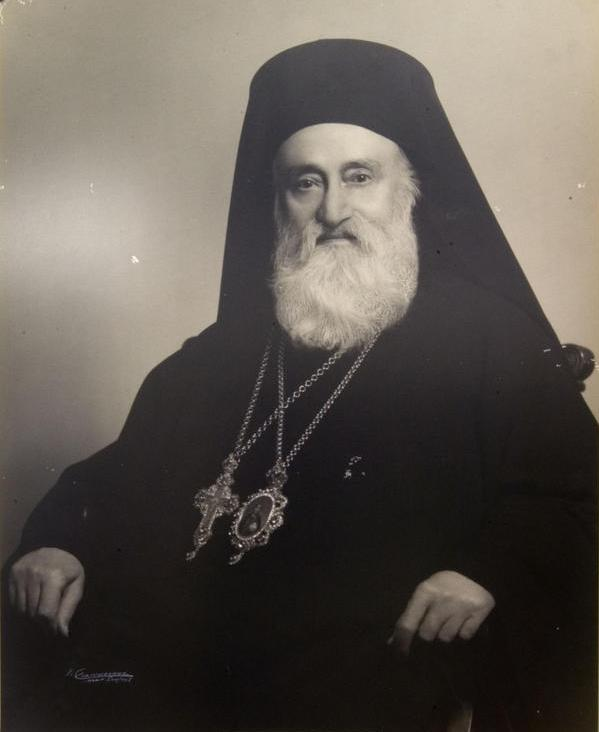
The future Chrysostomos II of Athens was the last metropolitan of Ephesus, ordained in 1922

- St Timothy the first bishop of Ephesus
- Onesimus the second bishop of Ephesus.
- seven of Onesimus's relatives
- Gaius of Ephesus
- Polycrates of Ephesus fl. 130–196
- Apollonius of Ephesus fl. 220
- Heraclides, bishop of Ephesus fl. 403
- Memnon fl. 440
- Bassianus (bishop) c. 444
- Stephen of Ephesus (448–51), attendee of the Second Council of Ephesus and the Council of Chalcedon
- Paul, Miaphysite Bishop of Ephesus 475
- John of Ephesus fl. 507–588
- Hypatius (c. 530)
- Abraham (after 542 or 553)
- Theodosius III c. 729–745
- Theodosius of Ephesus fl. 754
- Gregorius of Ephesus fl. 914–927
- Theodore of Ephesus (r. 1014–1018/1019)
- Kyriakos of Ephesus (r. 1018/1019(?)–1037)
- Michael VII Doukas c. 1080
- George Tornikes 1155-1156
- Nicholas Mesarites c. 1207
- Nicephorus c. 1260
- John Cheilas 1283/1284–1297
- Matthew of Ephesus 1329–1351
- Joseph II of Constantinople fl. 1393
- Mark of Ephesus c. 1395–1438
- Dionysios of Ephesus 1821
- Anthimus VI of Constantinople 1837
- Chrysostomos II of Athens 1922

== Monuments of worship ==
=== Past monuments ===
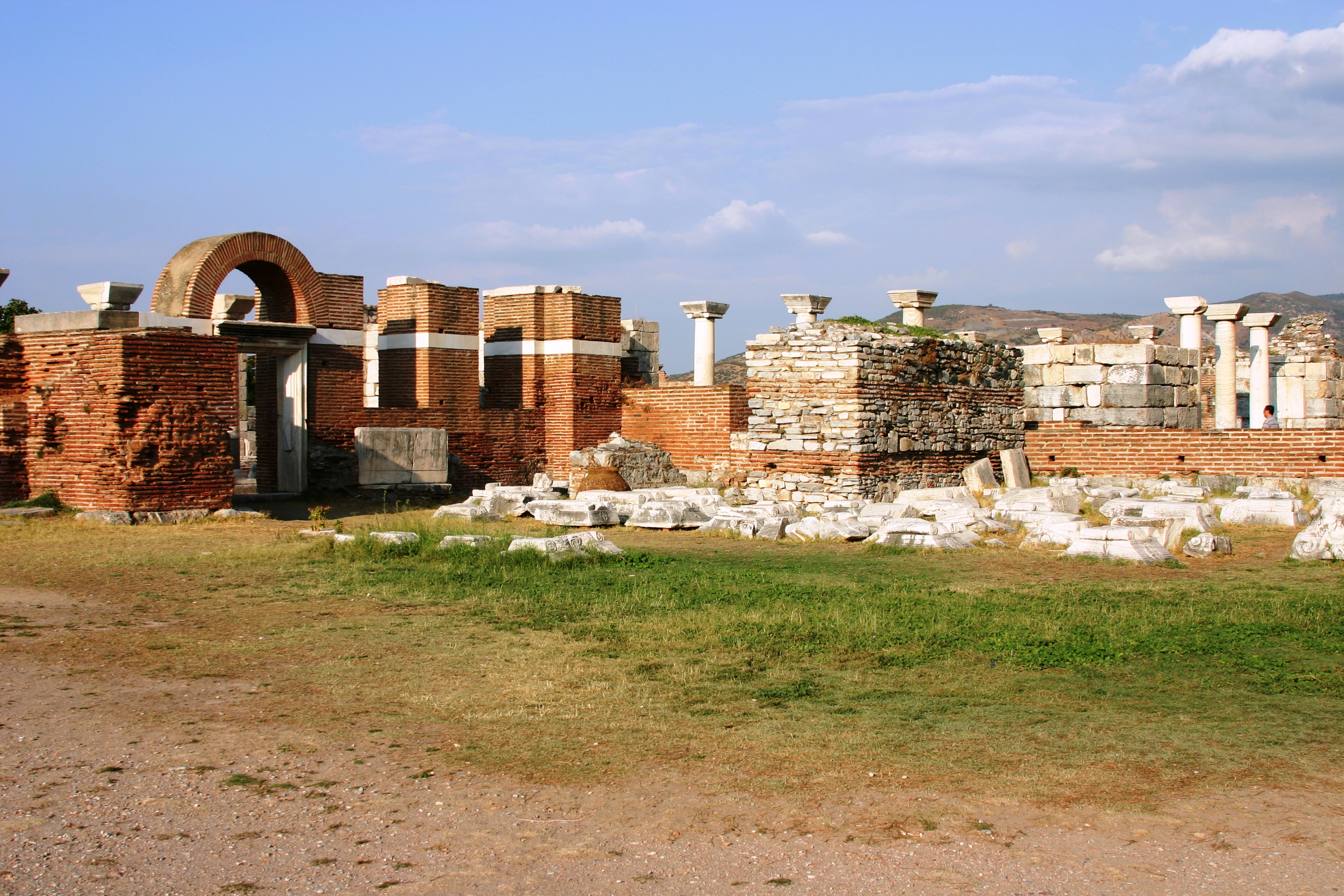
Ruins of the Basilica of Saint John

In Ephesus and the surrounding area a considerable number of monasteries were founded most probably already from the early Byzantine period. Later, in the 11th century, a new monastic community was created north of the city, which consisted of several monasteries, known as Mount Galesios. Among these monasteries, three were founded by Osios Lazaros: the Monastery of Saint Saviour, the Theotokos and of the Resurrection.

According to Christian traditions, Ephesus was the burial place of several Christian saints and martyrs. Saint Timothy was martyred on Pion Hill, today's Panayır dağ. Others said to be buried there include Philip the Evangelist, Saint Hermione, Mary Magdalene, Paul of Thebes, Aristobulus and the martyrs Adauctus and his daughter Callisthene. However, no monuments related with any of the above saints, have been excavated yet in Panayır dağ. According to a 12th-century account, the pilgrims could worship the relics of 300 holy persons, like that of Saint Alexander and Mary Magdalene. Another significant pilgrim site was the cave of the Seven Sleepers. Due to the holiness of the place, several notables during the medieval period, expressed their will to be buried near the cave. During this period, a complex of chapels, mausoleums and tombs was erected next to the site.

=== Surviving monuments ===
The Church of Saint John the Evangelist, was probably erected during the 2nd or 3rd century and was the most important pilgrim place in Ephesus. It was built on his tomb, on the site of an earlier shrine. In the 6th century Emperor Justinian I provided the expenses for the construction of a three-aisled basilica on the same place. Tradition conveys that the church, apart from personal objects of John, also contained the stone on which Jesus' body was rinsed after the Deposition from the cross.

== Sources ==
- Angold, Michael (1999). "Byzantium in exile". In Abulafia, David (ed.). The New Cambridge Medieval History, Volume 5, c.1198–c.1300. Cambridge: Cambridge University Press. pp. 543–568. ISBN 978-1-13905573-4. doi:10.1017/CHOL9780521362894.026.
- Evagrius, Scholasticus; Walford, Edward (2008-01-15). The Ecclesiastical History of Evagrius: A History of the Church from Ad 431 to Ad 594. Arx Publishing, LLC. ISBN 978-1-889758-88-6. Archived from the original on 2016-12-07.
- Foss, Clive (1979). Ephesus After Antiquity: A Late Antique, Byzantine, and Turkish City. CUP Archive. GGKEY:86PF5FFK1AP. Archived from the original on 2016-12-07.
- Jonsson, David J (2005-02-28). The Clash of Ideologies: The Making of the Christian and Islamic Worlds. Xulon Press. ISBN 978-1-59781-039-5. Archived from the original on 2016-12-07.
- Kiminas, Demetrius (2009). The Ecumenical Patriarchate. Wildside Press LLC. ISBN 9781434458766. Archived from the original on 2016-12-07.
- Treu, M. (1901). Matthaios metropolit von Ephesos: Uebcr sein leben und seine schriften. Potsdam.
- Laale, Hans Willer (2011-11-04). Ephesus (Ephesos): An Abbreviated History from Androclus to Constantine Xi. WestBow Press. ISBN 978-1-4497-1619-6. Archived from the original on 2016-12-07.
- Merriam-Webster (1999-09-01). Merriam-Webster's Encyclopedia of World Religions: An A-Z Guide to the World's Religions. Merriam-Webster. ISBN 978-0-87779-044-0. Archived from the original on 2016-12-07.
- Moustakas, Konstantinos (23 May 2001). "Great Online Encyclopaedia of Asia Minor" Εφέσου Μητρόπολις (Οθωμανική Περίοδος) (in Greek). Εγκυκλοπαίδεια Μείζονος Ελληνισμού, Μ. Ασία. Archived from the original on 10 March 2013.
- Plested, Marcus (2012-11-01). Orthodox Readings of Aquinas. Oxford University Press. ISBN 978-0-19-965065-1. Archived from the original on 2016-12-07.
- Ragia, Efi (10 November 2003). "Metropolis of Ephesos (Byzantium)". Εγκυκλοπαίδεια Μείζονος Ελληνισμού, Μ. Ασία. Archived from the original on 19 December 2015.
