= Golden Bull of 1213 =

There were two "Golden Bulls" issued in 1213,

- Golden Bull of 1213 in Germany
- Golden Bull of 1213 in England
