= Medieval Serbian charters =

Medieval Serbian charters includes mainly royal chrysobulls (hrisovulje) and charters (povelje) determining the legal status of endowments and regulation of the population, their rights and obligations of the monastic estates. As of 1989, there were 165 preserved monastery charters, a few royal chrysobulls, and one city charter.

Work	Date	Type	Description
Charter of Hilandar (1st)	1198–99	monastery charter	Stefan Nemanja for Hilandar. Founding charter.
Charter of Hilandar (2nd)	1200–01	monastery charter	Stefan the First-Crowned for Hilandar.
Charter of Žiča	1220	monastery charter	Stefan the First-Crowned for Žiča. Founding charter.
Charter of Skoplje	1299–1300	monastery charter	Stefan Milutin for the Monastery of St. George, Skopje. Includes regulations from the Soldier's Law.
St. Stephen Chrysobull	1314–16	monastery charter	Stefan Milutin for Banjska. Founding charter.
Charter of Gračanica	1321	monastery charter	Stefan Milutin for Gračanica. Founding charter.
Dečani chrysobulls	1330	monastery charter	Stefan Dečanski for Visoki Dečani. Founding charters.
Charter of Treskavac	1331–45	monastery charter	Stefan Dušan for Treskavac.
Charter of Ston	1331–45	charter	Stefan Dušan for Ston.
Charter of Kroja	1343	city charter	Stefan Dušan for Krujë.
Holy Archangels' Chrysobull	1348–52	monastery charter	Stefan Dušan for Monastery of the Holy Archangels.
Prilep Chrysobull	1346–55	charter	Stefan Dušan for Karyes.
Arhiljevica Chrysobull	1354	charter	Stefan Dušan for Arhiljevica.
Charter of Ravanica	1381	monastery charter	Lazar for Ravanica. Founding charter.
Mining Code	1412	code of law	Stefan Lazarević for Novo Brdo.
St. Paul's Decree	1430	monastery charter	Đurađ Branković for St. Paul's Monastery.

== See also ==
- Serbian manuscripts
- Serbian chronicles
- Medieval Serbian law
- Medieval Serbian literature

== Sources ==
- Blagojević, Miloš (2001). Државна управа у српским средњовековним земљама [State administration in the Serb medieval lands] (2nd ed.). Službeni list SRJ. ISBN 9788635504971.
- Janković, Dragoslav (1961). Istorija države i prava feudalne Srbije, XII-XV vek (in Serbian). Naućna knjiga.
- Miklosich, Franz (1858). Monumenta Serbica spectantia historiam Serbiae, Bosnae, Ragusii. Vienna: apud Guilelmum Braumüller.
- Mošin, Vladimir A.; Ćirković, Sima M.; Šindik, Dušan (2011). Зборник средњовековних ћириличких повеља и писама Србије, Босне и Дубровника (in Serbian). Историјски институт. ISBN 978-86-7743-090-0.
- Šarkić, Srđan (1996). Srednjovekovno srpsko pravo [Medieval Serbian law] (in Serbian). Matica srpska. ISBN 9788636303696.
- Šarkić, Srđan (1989). "Izvori srednjovekovnog Srpskog prava". Zbornik PFZ. 39: 184–.
- Stojanović, Ljubomir (1929). Старе српске повеље и писма. Vol. 1. Beograd–Sremski Karlovci.
- Stojanović, Ljubomir (1890). "Стари српски хрисовуљи, акти, биографије, летописи, типици, noменици, записи и др". Споменик СКА. 3.
