= Church soldiers =

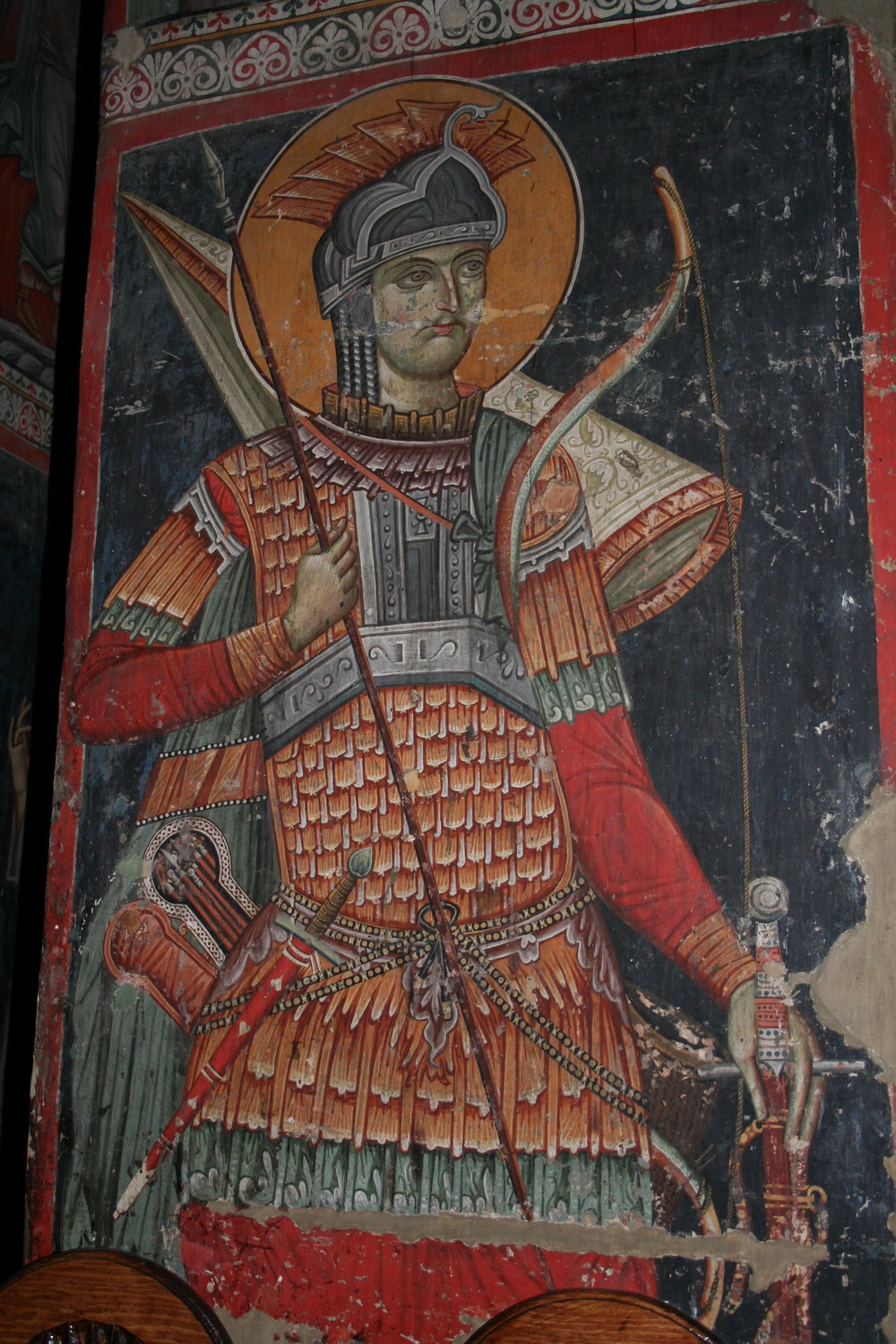
A soldier depicted in a Serbian Orthodox 14th-century monastery fresco.

The Church soldiers (Serbian: црквени војници, romanized: crkveni vojnici) were members of the military class in the Medieval Serbian state that served the Orthodox monasteries. There were vlasteličići (lesser nobility) and pronijari (pronoia-holders) that were bound to protect the monastery complex, towers, or fortifications, or other property within the monastery holdings (vlastelinstvo).

== Background ==
The basic obligation of the nobility was military service, and the nobility class itself sprung from the military. At the beginning of the 13th century, the nobility and soldiery essentially belonged to one and the same social class. This warrior class developed parallel to the dependent peasantry class. By the end of the 12th century, the dependent peasantry was attached to lands held by the monarch, Serbian Church or nobility.

== History ==
=== 13th century ===
The need to protect monasteries was clear to the ktetors already in the beginning of the 13th century.

The monasteries of Studenica, Mileševa, Hilandar all had their Church soldiers in metochion (dependency) communities. King Stefan Dragutin (r. 1276–1282) issued a charter to Hilandar regarding the metochion of St. Demetrios in Prizren in which chosen inhabitants of the Prizren metochion that were not of the dependent lower class would serve as Church soldiers to protect from Byzantine raids, and that instead of this they could send a man to serve in the guards of Hilandar on Mount Athos. Dragutin gave half of the villages of Bitunj, Oslnice, Mskovi and Zborsko "to the Holy Church, and half to the ljudi (people)"; the ljudi which received the halves of these villages were likely vlasteličići–Church soldiers. Regulations in the charter show that the vlasteličići (lesser nobility), who had a strict military obligation in war, were freed from military service if they were transferred to serve as Church soldiers.

Three individuals are mentioned in King Stefan Milutin's charter to the Monastery of St. George, Skopje (1299/1300) as Church soldiers "to serve according to the Soldier's Law". These were to serve and protect Orthodox monastery possessions which included their inherited plots (baština) or land tenure (pronoia). Hranča served as to keep the property within the vlastelinstvo that he had received as dowry; Manota served as to keep the inherited pronoia of his father-in-law Dragota in Rečica; Kalođorđe served as his baština laid in the village of Rečica. In the village of Leskovac near Prizren, Milutin subordinated the vlasteličić Bogoje to the Hilandar metochion to serve under the local hegumen. A baština holder in Glusi near Skopje was also subordinated Hilandar.

=== 14th century ===
Throughout the 14th century Serbian monasteries receive fortification elements, in towers, stronger walls or nearby fortresses, as the need to protect them and roads became more important. In order to create large and functioning monastery vlastelinstvo, the monarch transferred vlasteličići who held baština in the area to either serve the monastery or to exchange holdings, and also employed vlasteličići under their own service to the monastery. There was a large number of vlasteličići in the vlastelinstvo of Banjska, Visoki Dečani and Holy Archangels, and there were also pronoiars who served among the Church soldiers.

== See also ==
- Medieval Serbian army
- Medieval Serbian nobility
- Armed priests

== Sources ==
- Ivanović, Miloš (2025). "О хијерархијским односима међу српском средњовековном властелом" [On the Hierarchical Relations Among Serbian Medieval Nobility]. Историјски часопис. 74: 85–116 – via Academia.edu.
- Ivanović, Miloš (2020). "Властела у време владавине Стефана Првовенчаног" [The Nobility During the Rule of Stefan the First-Crowned]. Стефан Првовенчани и његово доба – via Academia.edu.
- Ivanović, Miloš (2014). "Развитак војне службе као основ формирања властеоског слоја у српској средњовековној држави" [Development of Military Service as Foundation for Creation of Nobility in Medieval Serbian State]. Војно-историјски гласник (I): 30–48.
- Koprivica, Marija (2024). ""Crkveni vojnici" u srednjovekovnoj Srbiji" ["Church Soldiers" in Medieval Serbia]. Црквене студије. 21: 241–255.
- Koprivica, Marija (2022). Vlastelinstva i ekonomija manastira srednjovekovne Srbije. Beograd, Niš – via Academia.edu.
