= Dvorane, Suva Reka =

Dvoran: Dvoran (Albanian); Дворане/Dvorane (Serbian)
- Village
- Location in Kosovo
- Coordinates: 42°18′38″N 20°54′26″E
- Location: Kosovo
- District: Prizren
- Municipality: Suharekë
- First mention: 1465
- Elevation: 2,172 ft (662 m)

Population (2024)
  - Total: 171
- Time zone: UTC+1 (CET)
  - Summer (DST): UTC+2 (CEST)
- Area code: +383 29
- Car plates: 04

Dvoran (Serbian: Dvorane, Albanian: Bungajë) is a village in the Suhareka municipality in the Republic of Kosovo. It has 140 inhabitants, all Albanian according to the 2011 census.

== Etymology ==
According to tradition, the village name is derived from dvorovi (Serbian for "courts"), because there were many in the village during the time of Emperor Dušan.

== Geography ==
The village lies in the valley sides of the Vrellë (Sopi, Lleshan rivers), on the left tributary of the Topluga, about nine kilometres southeast of Suharekë. It lies in the eastern part of the Prizrenski Podgor, at the foot of Rusenica in the Sharr Mountains. It is directly east of Mushtisht. The village is between 580 and 620 metres higher than sea level.

== History ==
The village was mentioned for the first time in the katastichos (obituary) of the Serbian Orthodox Holy Trinity Monastery at Rusenica (Sv. Trojice Rusenica) of several villagers of Mushtisht, written in 1465, including donors from Dvorane. An inscription dating to 1560, was written by a monk named Pahomije in a monastery near Gračanica, which he then donated (metochion) to Holy Trinity monastery. In the church of the Holy Saviour, Dvorane (Sv. Spasa), there were votive inscriptions dating to 1603. The local Popović family, which generated at least 18 generations of village priests in Dvorane, were important in the preservation of medieval Serbian literature: they had the Charter of Our Lady of Ljeviš, written by Serbian King Stephen Uroš III Dečanski of Serbia (r. 1321–31), in their direct property; the Russian consul in Prizren, Ivan Stepanovich Yastrebov (1839-1894), found it at the home of the last descendant of the family, Jovan Dvoranac Popović, who bequeathed it to the Serbian Academy of Sciences and Arts. It is believed that one of the forefathers of the family was the elder of a monastery near Prizren, and that he managed to transfer these valuable texts to the church in Dvorane. In 1779, Partenije Popović became monk of Saint Mark Koriški Monastery, whither he brought several important books. In 1859, a schoolteacher in Prizren, Nikola Musulin, found Dušan's Code, the constitution of the Serbian Empire. The following year the charter of the Monastery of the Holy Archangels also issued by Stefan Dušan was found in St. Nicholas Church, Korishë.

During the Kosovo War, on 11/12 June 1999, four members of the Ristić family were kidnapped from their home in Dvorane and never located.

Until 1999 the village church of St. Nicholas stood in Dvorane and a second church lay at the entrance to the village, the Church of St. Michael the Archangel. Both were destroyed. Holy Trinity Monastery was completely demolished in 1999, as well. 15 Orthodox church buildings were destroyed in total in the southeastern part of Prizrenski Podgor during the summer of 1999. On the road to Mušutište, the Church of the Holy Saviour, alongside which is a village cemetery, stands, registered to the Cultural Heritage of Serbia. During the night of 9/10 June 1984, ethnic Albanians desecrated 29 tombstones. In 2004, during unrest in Kosovo, Holy Saviour church was under the care and custody of German KFOR soldiers.

On 15 October 2008, an ethnic Albanian, later arrested, shot at a number of ethnic Serbs who were visiting the cemetery in Dvorane, while they were followed by members by 25 members of the KFOR and UNHCR.

Demographic history
Ethnic group	1948	1953	1961	1971	1981	1991
Serbs					380 (85.59%)	
Albanians					64 (14.41%)	
Total	431	467	518	444	444	510
