= Soldier's Law (Nemanjić) =

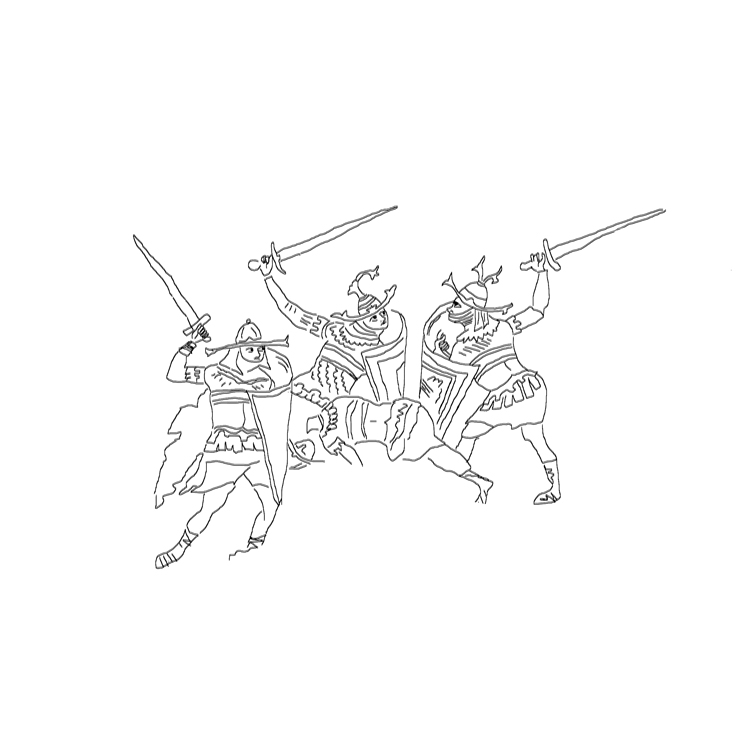
- Drawing of Serbian warriors depicted in a 14th-century Orthodox fresco
- Original title: Vojnički zakon (Војнички закон)
- Created: Before 1219
- Date effective: Possibly 1219–1349
- Superseded: 1349
- Location: Lost literary work
- Commissioned by: Possibly Stefan Nemanja (Nemanjić dynasty)
- Subject: Code (Serbian law)
- Purpose: Constitution for soldiery

The Soldier's Law (Serbian: Војнички закон, romanized: Vojnički zakon) was a Serbian medieval legal code for the warrior class that was used in the 13th century. It is a lost literary work, and only a basic regulation from it is known. It was explicitly mentioned in King Stefan Milutin's charter to the Monastery of St. George, Skopje (1299/1300), in which it is also referred to as "according to the law of Saint Simeon and Saint Sava", meaning it originated in the time of Stefan Nemanja (r. 1166–1196) and Archbishop Sava (t. 1219–1233). At the beginning of the 13th century there existed a social class of soldiery, however, the nobility (vlastela) and soldiery belonged to one and the same class into the reign of Milutin, both serving in the military, while the nobility served as administrators and judges, the soldiers did not. The known regulation shows that the vojnici (sing. vojnik) were expected to perform their duties as cavalrymen in the army. Warrior horses were not to be used to transport goods as per the Soldier's Law, with the intention for warrior horses only to be used militarily, and that the nobleman entered war as cavalry. Three individuals are mentioned in that charter as church soldiers (crkveni vojnici) "to serve according to the Soldier's Law". These were to serve and protect Orthodox monastery possessions which included their inherited plots (baština) or land tenure (pronoia). The regulations were then referred to in Milutin's Charter of Banjska (1315–1316).

The Yugoslav medievalist Rade Mihaljčić (1937–2020) wrote a monograph on the Soldier's Law in 1974.

== See also ==
- Nomos Stratiotikos, Byzantine legal code for the soldiery
- Zakonopravilo, Serbian medieval constitution

== Sources ==
- Ivanović, Miloš (2025). "О хијерархијским односима међу српском средњовековном властелом" [On the Hierarchical Relations Among Serbian Medieval Nobility]. Историјски часопис. 74: 85–116 – via Academia.edu.
- Ivanović, Miloš (2020). "Властела у време владавине Стефана Првовенчаног" [The Nobility During the Rule of Stefan the First-Crowned]. Стефан Првовенчани и његово доба – via Academia.edu.
- Koprivica, Marija (2024). ""Crkveni vojnici" u srednjovekovnoj Srbiji" ["Church Soldiers" in Medieval Serbia]. Црквене студије. 21: 241–255.
