= Golden bull =

Byzantine and mediaeval European legal decrees

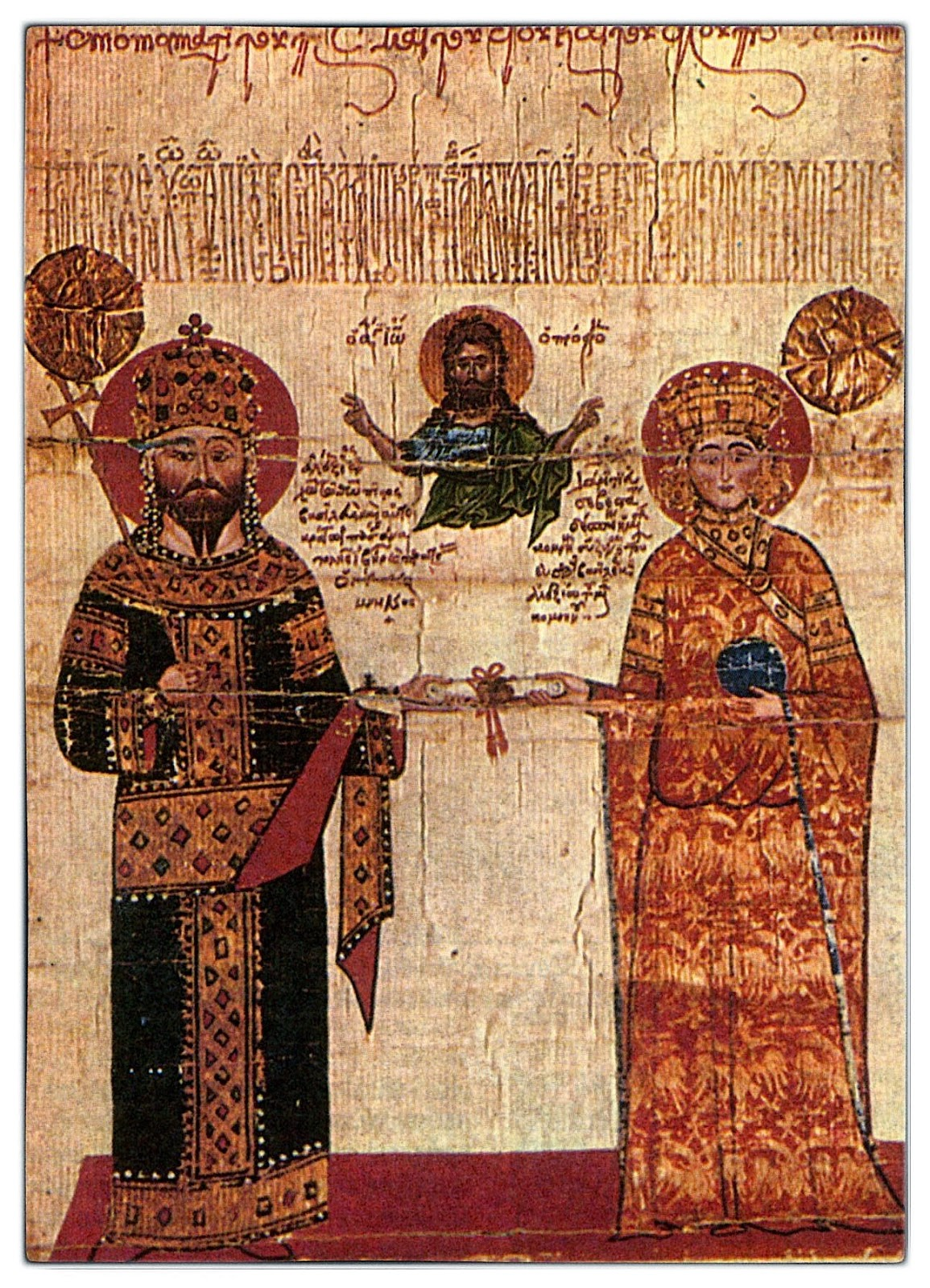
Imperial chrysobull of Alexios III of Trebizond, 1374

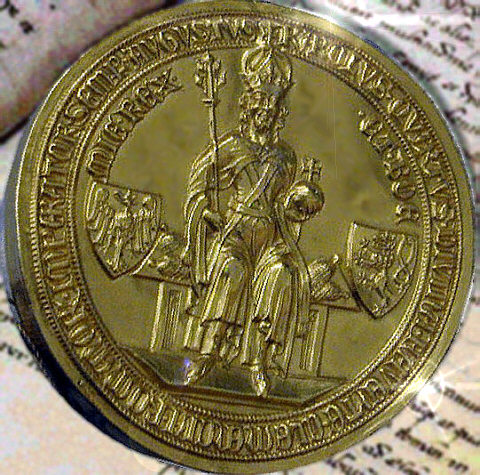
The gold seal of the Golden Bull of 1356 issued by Holy Roman Emperor Charles IV

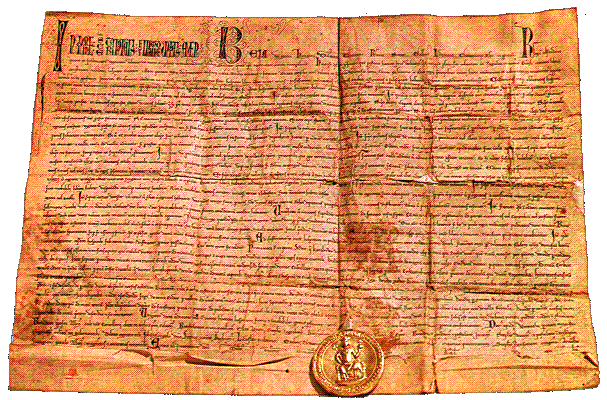
The Golden Bull of 1242 by Béla IV to inhabitants of Zagreb in Croatia

A golden bull or chrysobull was a decree issued by Byzantine emperors and monarchs in Europe during the Middle Ages and Renaissance.

== Description ==
A golden bull was a decree issued by Byzantine Emperors. It was later used by monarchs in Europe during the Middle Ages and Renaissance, most notably by the Holy Roman Emperors.

For nearly eight hundred years, they were issued unilaterally, without obligations on the part of the other party or parties. However, this eventually proved disadvantageous as the Byzantines sought to restrain the efforts of foreign powers to undermine the empire. During the 12th century, the Byzantines began to insert into golden bulls sworn statements of the obligations of their negotiating partners.

== Etymology ==
The term was originally coined for the golden seal (a bulla aurea), attached to the decree, but came to be applied to the entire decree. Such decrees were known as golden bulls in western Europe and chrysobullos logos, or chrysobulls, in the Byzantine Empire (χρυσός, chrysos, being Greek for gold).

=== Notable golden bulls ===
Notable golden bulls include:

- The Golden Bull of 1082, issued by Alexios I Komnenos to grant Venice merchants with free trading rights, exempt from tax, throughout the Byzantine Empire in return for their defense of the Adriatic Sea against the Normans.
- The Golden Bull of 1198, issued by Alexios III Angelos (1195–1203) donating the ancient monastery Hilandar to Serbia, "to the Serbs as an eternal gift...," thereby designating it, to serve the purpose of accepting the people of Serb descent, who seek to pursue the monastic way of life, as monasteries belonging to Iberia and Amalfi endure on the Mount Athos, exempt from any authority, including the authority of Protos.
- The Serbian Golden Bull of 1198, endowment by Stefan Nemanja and Saint Sava of Serbia. It was written and issued in 1198, in Serbian Language and Serbian Cyrillic.
- The Golden Bull of 1200, 2nd version of Hilandar Charter, was issued by Stefan the First Crowned of Serbia, in Serbian Language and Serbian Cyrillic.
- The Golden Bull of Sicily, issued in 1212 by Frederick II, Holy Roman Emperor
- The Golden Bull of 1213, issued by Frederick II, Holy Roman Emperor
- The Golden Bull of 1213, issued by the papacy to recognize its agreement with John Lackland (more commonly known as King John of England)
- The Golden Bull of 1214, issued by Frederick II, Holy Roman Emperor to cede all German territories north of the rivers Elbe and Elde to King Valdemar the Victorious of Denmark
- The Golden Bull of 1219 was the highest code of the Serbian Orthodox Church. It was completed and issued in 1219.
- The Golden Bull of Berne, supposedly issued by Frederick II in 1218, but now considered a forgery
- The Golden Bull of 1222, issued by King Andrew II of Hungary to confirm the rights of nobility and forced on him in much the same way King John of England was made to sign Magna Carta
- The Golden Bull of 1224 (the Goldener Freibrief) issued by Andrew to grant certain rights to the Saxon inhabitants of Transylvania
- The Golden Bull of Rimini (1226), issued by Frederick II, Holy Roman Emperor
- The Golden Bull of 1242 issued by King Béla IV to proclaim a free royal city for the inhabitants of Gradec (part of Zagreb) and Samobor in Croatia, during the Mongol invasion of Europe.
- The Golden Bull of 1267, issued by King Béla IV of Hungary
- The Golden Bull of 1314, issued in 1314 in Serbia.
- The Golden Bull of Dečani, issued in 1330 in Serbia.
- The Golden Bull of 1348, issued by King Charles I of Bohemia, later Holy Roman Emperor as Charles IV, to confer privileges and immunities on Charles University established by Pope Clement VI in Prague, one of the oldest universities in the world
- The Golden Bull of 1349, issued by Emperor Stefan Dušan of Serbia.
- The Golden Bull of 1356 (one of the most famous golden bulls), issued by Holy Roman Emperor Charles IV for promulgation at the Diet of Nuremberg, to define (and to last more than four hundred years) the constitutional structure of the Holy Roman Empire
- The Golden Bull of 1702, issued by Leopold I, Holy Roman Emperor to establish the Akademia Leopoldina in the Silesian capital of Breslau (present name: Wrocław), the future University of Breslau (Universitas Vratislatensis)

== See also ==
- Bulla (seal)
- Papal bull
