= Kingdom of Serbia (1217–1346) =

Medieval state in Southeastern Europe (1217–1346)

Kingdom of Serbia Краљевина Србија Kraljevina Srbija
- 1217–1346
- Flag Coat of arms

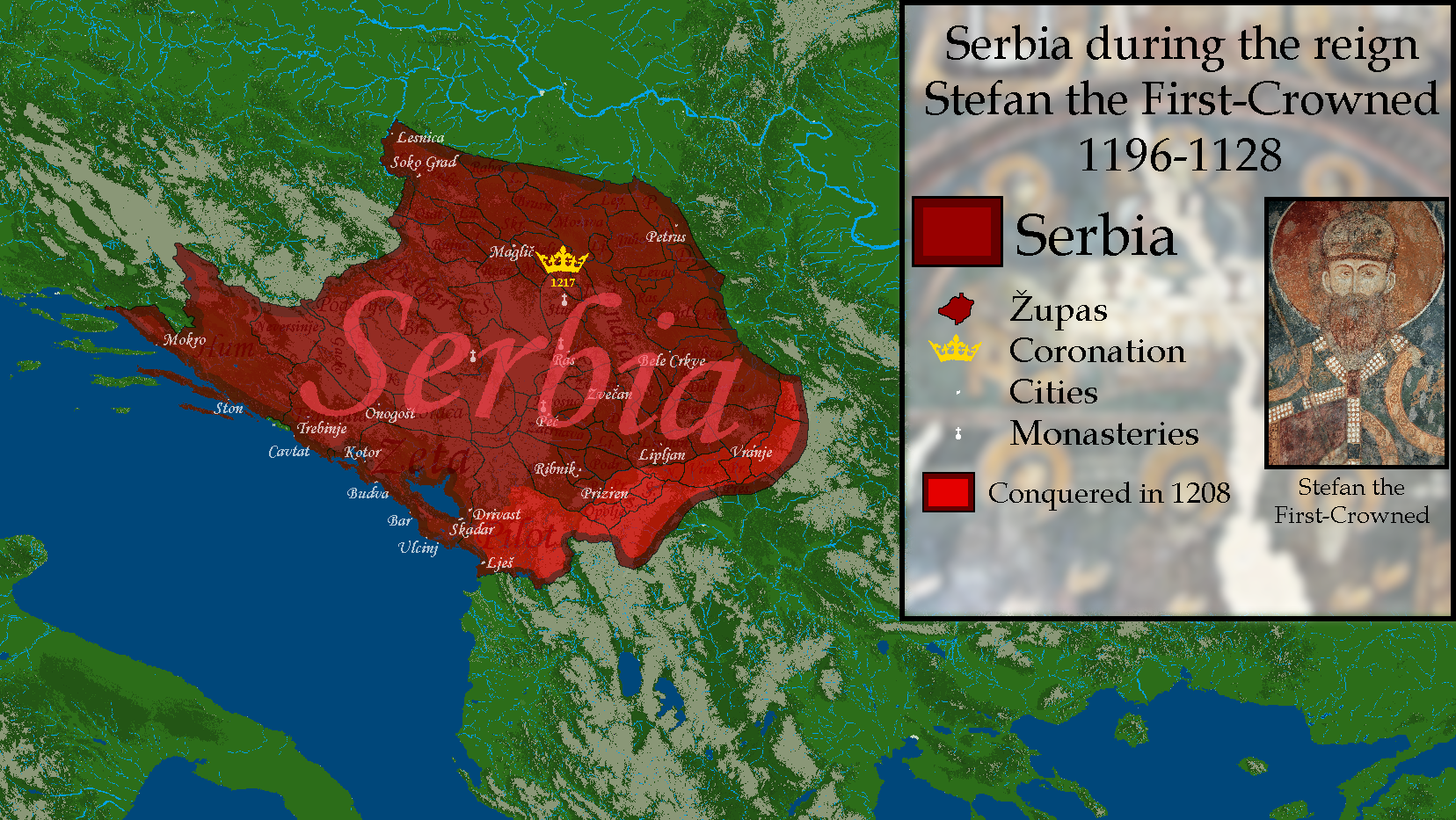
- Kingdom of Serbia in 1217
- Capital: Ras; Debrc; Skopje; Prizren
- Common languages: Old Serbian
- Religion: Eastern Orthodoxy
- Demonyms: Serbian, Serb
- Government: Monarchy
- King
  - 1196–1228: Stefan the First-Crowned (Grand Prince↑King)
  - 1228–1233: Stefan Radoslav
  - 1233–1243: Stefan Vladislav
  - 1243–1276: Stefan Uroš
  - 1276–1282: Stefan Dragutin
  - 1282–1322: Stefan Milutin
  - 1322–1331: Stefan Dečanski
  - 1331–1355: Stefan Dušan (King↑Emperor)
- Legislature: State Assembly
- Historical era: Middle Ages
  - Proclamation of the Kingdom: 1217
  - Proclamation of the Empire: 1346
Preceded by	Succeeded by
Byzantine Empire under the Komnenos dynasty; Grand Principality of Serbia	Serbian Empire
- Today part of: Serbia; Montenegro; Bosnia and Herzegovina; Croatia

The Kingdom of Serbia (Serbian: Краљевина Србија / Kraljevina Srbija, or the Serbian Kingdom (Serbian: Српско краљевство / Srpsko kraljevstvo), also known as Kingdom of Serbs (Serbian: Краљевина Срба / Kraljevina Srba); Latin: Regnum Serbiæ; Greek: Βασίλειο της Σερβίας), also known by historical exonym Rascia (Serbian: Рашка / Raška), was a medieval Serbian kingdom in Southern Europe comprising most of what is today Serbia (excluding Vojvodina), Kosovo, and Montenegro, as well as southeastern Bosnia and Herzegovina, parts of coastal Croatia south of the Neretva river (excluding Dubrovnik), Albania north of the Drin River, North Macedonia, and a small part of western Bulgaria.

The medieval Kingdom of Serbia existed from 1217 to 1346 and was ruled by the Nemanjić dynasty. The Grand Principality of Serbia was elevated with the regal coronation of Stefan the First-Crowned as king, after the reunification of Serbian lands. In 1219, the Serbian Orthodox Church was reorganized as an autocephalous archbishopric, headed by Saint Sava. The kingdom was proclaimed an empire in 1346, but kingship was not abolished as an institution, since the title of a king was used as an official designation for a co-ruler of the emperor.

== Background ==
The regal coronation of Stefan Nemanjić in 1217 was not a novelty in Serbian history, since there had already been a long tradition of kingship among previous Serbian rulers, centered in Duklja (11th century). During the Nemanjić era, the previous Serbian kingdom in Duklja was referred to as the "Old Kingdom of our forefathers" and such views were also reflected in the royal titles of Stefan Nemanjić and his successors, who styled themselves as kings of all Serbian Lands, including Duklja. Realizing the importance of royal heritage, grand prince Stefan Nemanja (1166–1196), father of Stefan Nemanjić, granted his elder son Vukan Nemanjić rule in Duklja, with the title of king.

By that time, the "Old Kingdom" of Duklja and its former rulers from the Vojislavljević dynasty (kings Mihajlo and Constantine Bodin) were regarded as royal predecessors to the Nemanjić dynasty, that branched from the previous Vukanović dynasty in Raška. Older relations between the two dynasties (Vojislavljević / Vukanović) and the two regions (Duklja / Raška) were very close. In 1083, king Constantine Bodin of Duklja appointed his nephews Vukan and Marko vassals in Raška, one of the inner provinces of his realm. Each province had its own nobility and institutions, and each acquired a member or relative of the Vojislavljević dynasty to govern as župan. Between 1089 and 1091, the Byzantine Empire launched a campaign on Duklja. An internal war broke out in the realm among Bodin's relatives, greatly weakening Duklja. Vukan of Raška took the opportunity to assert himself and broke away, claiming the title of Grand Prince of Serbia.

Up to the end of the 11th century, Duklja had been the center of the Serbian realm, as well as the main state resisting Byzantium. From that time, Raška became the most powerful of the Serbian states, under the rule of the Vukanović dynasty, and it remained so throughout the entire 12th century. Raška also replaced Duklja as the main opponent of the Byzantine Empire. Bodin's heirs were forced to recognize Byzantine overlordship, and now held only the small territories of Duklja and Travunia. During the reign of Vukan's successors, the Byzantines sought to conquer Raška on several occasions, but through resistance, and diplomatic ties with Hungary, that Serbian principality kept its independence. By the time when Stefan Nemanja became the grand župan of Raška (c. 1166), old Duklja was half conquered by the Byzantines reduced to a small principality. Soon after 1180, Stefan Nemanja liberated Duklja thus reuniting Serbian lands, and invested his son Vukan with rule over Duklja with the traditional title of the king. Since Nemanja's second son Stefan became grand župan in 1196, rivalry occurred among brothers, culminating in 1202 when Stefan was overthrown.

== History ==
=== Reign of Stefan the First-Crowned ===
In 1204, Stefan Nemanjić regained his rule in Raška and made peace with his brother Vukan of Duklja, who died in 1208. The actual peacemaker was their youngest brother Rastko, former prince of Zahumlje who renounced his rule to become a monk, and took the name Sava, turning all his efforts to spreading Eastern Orthodoxy among his people. Since the Roman Catholic Church already had ambitions to spread its influence to Southeastern Europe as well, Stefan used these circumstances to eventually obtain the recognition of kingship from the Pope, thereby becoming Serbian king in 1217. In Byzantium, Sava managed to secure autocephaly (independence) for the Serbian Church and became the first Serbian archbishop in 1219. In the same year Sava published the first constitution in Serbia – St. Sava's Nomocanon (Serbian: Zakonopravilo). The Nomocanon was a compilation of Civil law, based on Roman Law, and Canon law, based on Ecumenical Councils. Its basic purpose was to organize the functions of the young Serbian kingdom and the Serbian church. Thus the Serbs acquired both political and religious independence. In 1220, grand assembly of the realm was held in Žiča, were Stefan was crowned by the Orthodox ritual and coronation was performed by archbishop Sava. That act served as a precedent for all their successors: all Serbian kings of the Nemanjić dynasty were crowned in Žiča, by Serbian archbishops.

=== Reign of Radoslav, Vladislav, Uroš I and Dragutin ===
The next generation of Serbian rulers – the sons of Stefan Prvovenčani, Radoslav, Vladislav, and Uroš I – marked a period of stagnation of the state structure. All three kings were more or less dependent on some of the neighbouring states – Byzantium, Bulgaria, or Hungary. The ties with the Hungarians played a decisive role as Uroš I was succeeded by his son Dragutin, whose wife was a Hungarian princess. Later, when Dragutin abdicated in favour of his younger brother Milutin, in 1282, the Hungarian king Ladislaus IV gave him lands in northeastern Bosnia, the region of Mačva, and the city of Belgrade, whilst he managed to conquer and annex lands in northeastern Serbia. Thus, some of these territories became part of the Serbian state for the first time. His new state was named Kingdom of Srem. In that time the name Srem was a designation for two territories: Upper Srem (present day Srem) and Lower Srem (present day Mačva). The Kingdom of Srem under the rule of Stefan Dragutin was actually Lower Srem, but some historical sources mention that Stefan Dragutin also ruled over Upper Srem and Slavonia. After Dragutin died in 1316, his son, king Vladislav II, became king and ruled until 1325.

=== Reign of Milutin ===
Under Dragutin's younger brother, King Milutin, Serbia grew stronger despite having to occasionally fight wars on three different fronts. King Milutin was an apt diplomat much inclined to the use of a customary medieval diplomatic and dynastic marriages. He was married five times, with Hungarian, Bulgarian, and Byzantine princesses. He is also famous for building churches, some of which are the finest examples of Medieval Serbian architecture, including the Gračanica monastery in Kosovo, the Cathedral in Hilandar monastery on Mount Athos, and the St. Archangel Church in Jerusalem. Because of his endowments, King Milutin has been proclaimed a saint, in spite of his tumultuous life. He was succeeded on the throne by his son Stefan, later dubbed Stefan Dečanski.

Milutin restored central royal authority in Serbia. After getting into power, he started lengthy attacks on Byzantine Macedonia, winning significant territorial gains, including the city of Skopje, move that had important results. The strategically important region of Macedonia was disputed for long between Byzantines, Bulgarians and Serbs. The expansion into the area marked the start of Serbian dominance in the Balkans. By this, Serbian policy shifted from its original north-western Adriatic-Danubian focus, into Byzantine-centered south-central Balkans. By acquiring Skopje, Milutin's kingdom possessed a strategically located, well-fortified city that could serve as capital to a territorially extensive state. Its central geo-strategical position on the important Vardar-Morava commercial route made it a natural new political, economical and cultural center. Skopje's benefits, combined with Serbia's flourishing mining and trade resources, guaranteed Milutin a status as a major player in Balkan affairs.

Although the major events were happening in the South, Milutin also devoted attention in Serbian affairs in the North. With his deposed brother Dragutin governing the Belgrade region, the two brothers acted in concert as military allies, Dragutin helping Milutin in the South and vice versa. By early 1290s Serbia expanded towards the vicinity of Vidin. Threatened by Serbian expansion, Shishman of Vidin failed to repel the brothers forces, and accepted Serbian suzerainty.

In the South, Milutin obtained territorial gains in Macedonia and Northern Albania from Byzantine emperor Andronikos II Palaiologos. With Andronikos suffering from both internal and external pressures, he sought peace with Milutin, and a treaty was sealed in 1299. As result, Milutin kept all conquered territories, Skopje became kingdoms capital, and he married Byzantine princess Simonis (Simonida), with the wedding taking place in Thessaloniki, that same year. Simonis, aged 5 at time, was kept in the royal nursery for some years before her husband consummated the marriage. Simonis brought a large entourage to Serbia, and with her arrival Serbia received a massive injection of Byzantine culture. Byzantine-style court ceremonials and dress were adopted, Byzantine functional and honorary titles appeared, court offices were renamed, and Byzantine administrative, fiscal and legal institutions were copied. Byzantinization was further expanded by Serbia's newly won populous Greek-speaking regions, in which Milutin retained all former Byzantine political, social and cultural activities.

The final two decades of Milutin reign were marked by civil strife with his brother Dragutin and the regional nobles, and with territorial losses to Hungarians in the north. Milutin also faced problems with his illegitimate son Stefan Dečanski, who was unhappy with his fathers favouritism towards his legitimate younger brother Konstantin. When Milutin died without leaving a testament, civil war erupted between Dečanski, Konstantin and their cousin Vladislav II. Dečanski ended up victorious, and was crowned as Stefan Uroš III Dečanski.

=== Reign of Stefan Dečanski ===
Stefan Uroš III, known as Stefan Dečanski, spread the kingdom to the east by winning the town of Niš and surrounding counties, and to the south by acquiring territories in Macedonia. He built the Visoki Dečani monastery in Metohija, the most monumental example of Serbian Medieval architecture, earning him his nickname "Dečanski" (of Dečani). King Stefan defeated the Bulgarians in Battle of Velbazhd in 1330.

However, it started not so well, since already between 1322 and 1326 Serbia lost the region of Hum to Bosnia. In the same time, the Despotate of Vidin, under Mihail Shishman, got to set free from Serbian suzerainty and returned to that of Bulgaria. Shishman would become Bulgarian tsar in 1323. On the other side, Byzantium was not doing well hard-pressed withstanding periodic Serbian and Bulgarian raids. Civil war erupted in which Bulgarians supported young Andronikos, and Serbs the elder Andronikos side. Despite younger Andronikos win within Byzantine internal struggle for power, by the time Byzantine civil war ended Serbia was the dominant Balkan power. Despite having supported the losing side, Serbia had managed to expand itself into Macedonia, which was the bone of contention between the three sides. As result, Byzantines and Bulgarians viewed Dečanski as a threat, and forged an anti-Serbian treaty which took action in 1330 when both launched an offensive against Serbia. Andronikos attacked Serbian-held parts of Macedonia, while Bulgarians met in a decisive battle near Kyustendil (Velbuzhd) in eastern Macedonia. The Bulgarian army was destroyed in that battle, and Mihail Shishman, Bulgarian Tsar, fatally wounded. When Andronikos heard the news, he quickly withdrew.

The Battle of Velbazhd had enormous consequences. After the defeat, Bulgaria lay militarily crippled and politically subordinated to Serbia's interests. Sources diverge whether all of Bulgaria, or some parts, or technically officially not, Bulgaria became a vassal of Serbia, but Bulgaria's new tsar, Ivan Alexander, in this new reality, had his ability to conduct independent Bulgarian policies somehow limited.

Dečanski then launched a war of total Macedonian conquest in 1331. Andronikos tried to negotiate peace in 1334, however Byzantines slipped into another civil war, leaving open way for Serbia to gain more power and territory and consolidate its hegemonic position in the Balkans. Serb nobles were eager to deliver a final strike to the Byzantines, but Dečanski decided otherwise. His son, Stefan Dušan took advantage of this alienation of Serb nobility, and lead a coup that deposed his father.

=== Reign of Stefan Dušan ===
Coronation of Stefan Dušan

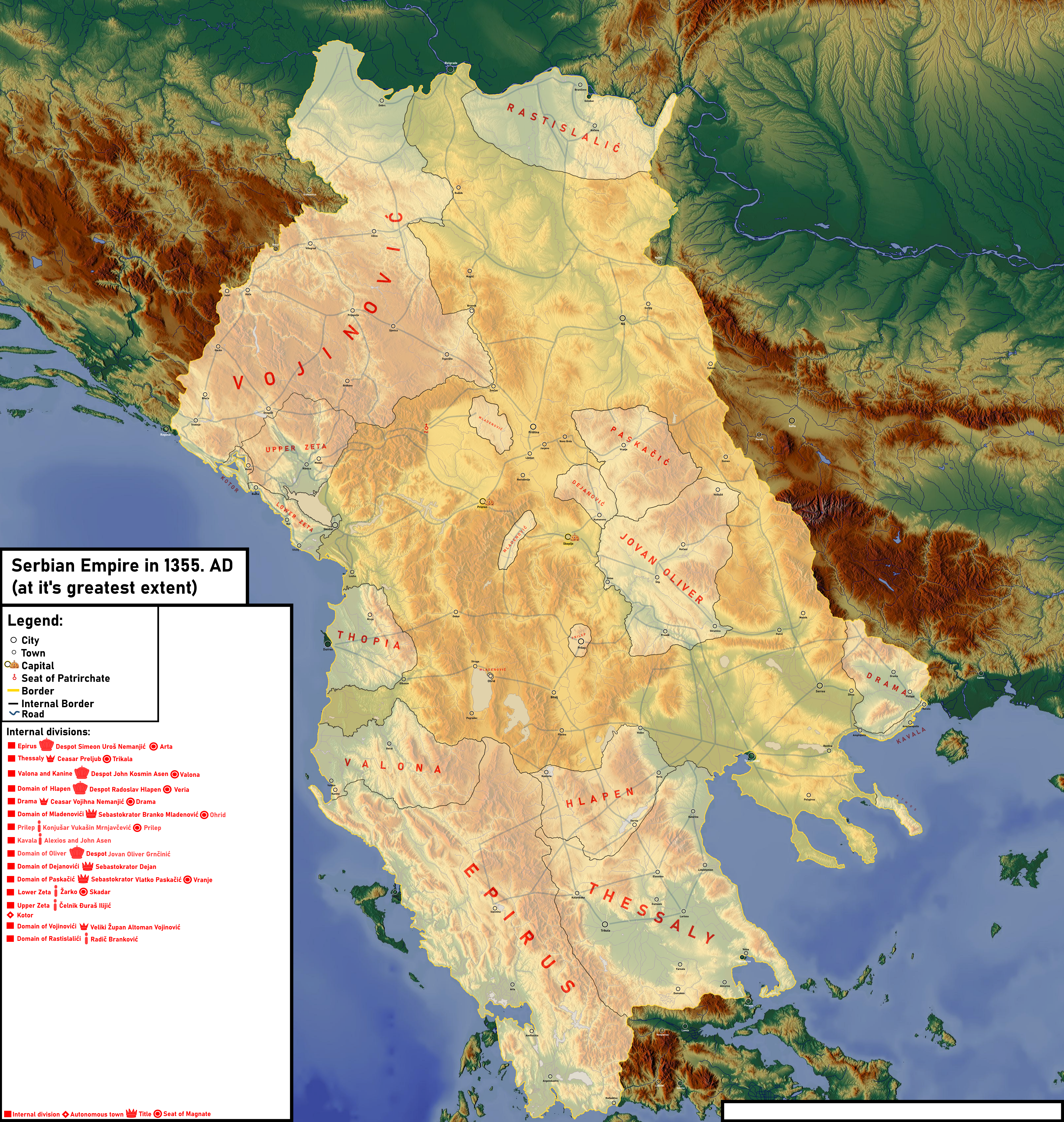
Serbian Empire in 1355

Stefan Dečanski was overthrown in 1331 by his son, Stefan Dušan. Taking advantage of the Byzantine civil war of 1341–1347, Dušan doubled the size of his kingdom, seizing territories to the south, southeast, and east at the expense of the Byzantine Empire. He conquered almost the entire territory of present-day Greece, except for the Peloponnese and the islands. After he conquered the city of Serres, he was crowned the Emperor of Serbs and Greeks in Skoplje (former Bulgarian capital) by the Serbian Patriarch, on April 16, 1346. These actions, which the Byzantines received with indignation, appear to have been supported by the Bulgarian Empire and tsar Ivan Alexander, as the Patriarch of Bulgaria Simeon had participated in both the creation of a Serbian Patriarchate of Peć and the imperial coronation of Stefan Uroš IV Dušan. Dushan made marriage alliance with Bulgarian tsar Ivan Alexander, marrying his sister Helena, freeing himself from its concerns over the eastern bordering. The goal of Stefan Dushan was to become the successor of the Byzantine Emperors, and he tried to organize a Crusade with the Pope against the threatening Turks. He then turned to the South and pushed the borders towards Thessaloniki where he was stopped by the cities strong walls. Dušan accepted Andronikos peace offer in 1334, however, when Andronikos died, in 1341, there was a renewed civil war in Byzantium. One of the sides, John VI Kantakouzenos, appealed to Dušan for help, and was granted asylum in Serbia. However, when the governor of Thessaly, who also controlled South Epirus, recognised Kantakouzenos as emperor, Dušan ceased its support and switched sides. This is when Kantakouzenos turns towards Seljuk Turks for help and Turks for first time entered European soil.

The Imperial constitution, Dušan's Code (Serbian: Dušanov zakonik), was enacted in 1349 and amended in 1354. The Code was based on Roman-Byzantine law. The legal transplanting is notable within articles 171 and 172 of Dušan's Code, which regulated the juridical independence. They were taken from the Byzantine code Basilika (book VII, 1, 16–17). Dušan opened new trade routes and strengthened the economy of the state. Serbia flourished, becoming one of the most developed countries and cultures in Europe, with a high political, economic, and cultural reputation.

Dušan died suddenly in December 1355 at age 47.

== Rulers ==
King	Reign	Notes
Stefan the First-Crowned	1217–1228	second son of Stefan Nemanja. He inherited the title of Grand Prince in 1196 when his father retired as a monk. His reign began with a struggle against his brother Vukan II, who expelled Stefan to Bulgaria.; Kaloyan gave him an army of Cumans in exchange for some eastern territories. The crisis ended when Sava negotiated a peace between the brothers and Stefan's power was cemented.; He was crowned King in 1217, and then Sava gains autocephaly, becoming the first Archbishop of Serbs in 1219, thus Serbia retained full independence.
Stefan Radoslav	1228–1233	son of Stefan II. He ruled Zahumlje during the reign of his father and also held a governor status of Zeta. He was the co-founder of the Žiča monastery with his father, who would abdicate in 1227 due to illness, taking monastic vows.; Radoslav was crowned by his uncle Sava, the Archbishop of Serbia.; His marriage to Anna Angelina Komnene Doukaina would prove unpopular as she undermined his authority, he lost the loyalty of the people and in 1233 a revolt against them prompted the couple to flee to Dubrovnik.
Stefan Vladislav	1233–1243	son of Stefan II. He succeeded his brother Radoslav in 1233 and ruled for 10 years, before being overthrown by his younger brother Uroš. He continued to rule Zeta.; The first known flag design of Serbia was found in his treasury.
Stefan Uroš I	1243–1276	son of Stefan II. He succeeded his brother Vladislav.; He boosted trade with Dubrovnik and Kotor, marking a beginning of economic prosperity.; In 1253 a war was fought against Dubrovnik, peace was signed in 1254, and in the 1260s a second war begun that ended in 1268.; Uroš immediately turned towards Hungary, successfully taking Mačva, he was however captured and peace was ensured between the two Kings through marriage of Dragutin and Catherine, the daughter of Stephen V of Hungary.; His oldest son Dragutin would have succeeded his rule, but Uroš favored Stefan Milutin, the younger son, as successor. He was overthrown by Dragutin in 1276.
Stefan Dragutin	1276–1282	son of Stefan Uroš I. He overthrew his father with help from the Hungarian royalty (through his marriage to Catherine of Hungary) after the Battle of Gacko.; He was injured in 1282, and gave the supreme rule to his younger brother Milutin, but continued to rule what would later become the Kingdom of Srem with the capital at Belgrade.; Milutin boosted relations with the Byzantine Emperor, and refused to give the rule to Vladislav II (Dragutin's son), causing a split of the Kingdom. Dragutin continued to rule the northern frontier in Hungarian alliance, but in the last years re-connected with Serbia, acting as a vassal.
Stefan Milutin	1282–1321	son of Stefan Uroš I. He succeeded his brother Dragutin.; Upon his accession, he immediately turned towards Macedonia, conquering the northern part with Skoplje, which became his capital. He continued deep into Byzantine lands, taking northern Albania and as far as Kavala. He also took Bulgarian Vidin, and later Durrës.; He was in a succession war with Dragutin after peace was signed with the Byzantines in 1299. Milutin aids the Byzantines against the Ottoman Turks at the Battle of Gallipoli (1312), which ended in a victory. When Dragutin died he put most of his lands with Belgrade under his rule, in the same year his son Stefan Uroš III tried to overthrow him, resulting in him being exiled to Constantinople. In 1319 the Hungarians took all of Dragutin's lands but Braničevo.; Stefan Konstantin was to be King, but Uroš III returns to Serbia in 1321, being pardoned, retaining the rule.
Stefan Dečanski	1321–1331	son of Stefan Uroš II Milutin
Stefan Dušan	1331–1355	son of Uroš III. He was a very skilled military leader, and defeated Bosnia and Bulgaria at the age of 20. As his father was not an able conqueror, Dušan removed him from the throne.; Dušan doubled the size of the realm, taking Byzantine lands as far as the Peloponnese. He was crowned Emperor in 1346. The Serbian Empire flourished, becoming one of the most developed countries and cultures in Europe.; He enacted the constitution - Dušan's Code in 1349.

== See also ==
- Serbia in the Middle Ages
- Serbian Empire

== Sources ==
- Angold, Michael (2011). "The Latin Empire of Constantinople, 1204–1261: Marriage Strategies". Identities and Allegiances in the Eastern Mediterranean after 1204. Farnham: Ashgate Publishing Limited. pp. 47–68. ISBN 9781409410980.
- Bataković, Dušan T., ed. (2005). Histoire du peuple serbe [History of the Serbian People] (in French). Lausanne: L’Age d’Homme. ISBN 9782825119587.
- Čanak-Medić, Milka; Todić, Branislav (2017). The Monastery of the Patriarchate of Peć. Novi Sad: Platoneum, Beseda. ISBN 9788685869839.
- Carter, Francis W. (1969). "An Analysis of the Medieval Serbian Oecumene: A Theoretical Approach". Geografiska Annaler. Series B: Human Geography. 51 (1–2): 39–56. doi:10.1080/04353684.1969.11879331.
- Ćirković, Sima (2004). The Serbs. Malden: Blackwell Publishing. ISBN 9781405142915.
- Ćirković, Sima (2014) [1964]. "The Double Wreath: A Contribution to the History of Kingship in Bosnia". Balcanica (45): 107–143. doi:10.2298/BALC1445107C.
- Curta, Florin (2006). Southeastern Europe in the Middle Ages, 500–1250. Cambridge: Cambridge University Press. ISBN 9780521815390.
- Curta, Florin (2019). Eastern Europe in the Middle Ages (500–1300). Leiden and Boston: Brill. ISBN 9789004395190.
- Даничић, Ђура, ed. (1866). Животи краљева и архиепископа српских [Lives of Serbian Kings and Archbishops] (in Serbian). Загреб.
- Dvornik, Francis (1962). The Slavs in European History and Civilization. New Brunswick: Rutgers University Press. ISBN 9780813507996.
- Fine, John V. A. Jr. (1991) [1983]. The Early Medieval Balkans: A Critical Survey from the Sixth to the Late Twelfth Century. Ann Arbor: University of Michigan Press. ISBN 0-472-08149-7.
- Fine, John V. A. (1994) [1987]. The Late Medieval Balkans: A Critical Survey from the Late Twelfth Century to the Ottoman Conquest. Ann Arbor, Michigan: University of Michigan Press. ISBN 978-0-472-10079-8.
- Gál, Judit (2013). "IV. Béla és I. Uroš szerb uralkodó kapcsolata" [The Relationship of Kings Béla IV of Hungary and Uroš I of Serbia]. Századok (in Hungarian). 147 (2): 471–499.
- Gavrilović, Zaga (2001). Studies in Byzantine and Serbian Medieval Art. London: The Pindar Press. ISBN 9781899828340.
- Hupchick, Dennis P. (2002). The Balkans: From Constantinople to Communism. New York: Palgrave Macmillan. ISBN 9780312299132.
- Isailović, Neven (2016). "Living by the Border: South Slavic Marcher Lords in the Late Medieval Balkans (13th–15th Centuries)". Banatica. 26 (2): 105–117. Archived from the original on 12 December 2022.
- Isailović, Neven (2017). "Legislation Concerning the Vlachs of the Balkans Before and After Ottoman Conquest: An Overview". State and Society in the Balkans Before and After Establishment of Ottoman Rule. Belgrade: The Institute of History. pp. 25–42. ISBN 9788677431259.
- Ivanović, Miloš; Isailović, Neven (2015). "The Danube in Serbian-Hungarian Relations in the 14th and 15th Centuries". Tibiscvm: Istorie–Arheologie. 5: 377–393.
- Ivanović, Miloš (2019). "Serbian hagiographies on the warfare and political struggles of the Nemanjić dynasty (from the twelfth to the fourteenth century)". Reform and Renewal in Medieval East and Central Europe: Politics, Law and Society. Cluj-Napoca: Romanian Academy, Center for Transylvanian Studies. pp. 103–129.
- Ivić, Pavle, ed. (1995). The History of Serbian Culture. Edgware: Porthill Publishers. ISBN 9781870732314.
- Jireček, Constantin (1911). Geschichte der Serben. Vol. 1. Gotha: Perthes.
- Jireček, Constantin (1918). Geschichte der Serben. Vol. 2. Gotha: Perthes.
- Kalić, Jovanka (1995). "Rascia – The Nucleus of the Medieval Serbian State". The Serbian Question in the Balkans. Belgrade: Faculty of Geography. pp. 147–155.
- Kalić, Jovanka (2017). "The First Coronation Churches of Medieval Serbia". Balcanica (48): 7–18. doi:10.2298/BALC1748007K. hdl:21.15107/rcub_dais_4886.
- Krstić, Aleksandar R. (2016). "The Rival and the Vassal of Charles Robert of Anjou: King Vladislav II Nemanjić". Banatica. 26 (2): 33–51.
- Marjanović-Dušanić, Smilja (2006). "Lʹ idéologie monarchique dans les chartes de la dynastie serbe des Némanides (1168–1371): Étude diplomatique". Archiv für Diplomatik: Schriftgeschichte, Siegel- und Wappenkunde. 52: 149–158. doi:10.7788/afd.2006.52.jg.149. S2CID 96483243.
- McDaniel, Gordon L. (1984). "On Hungarian-Serbian Relations in the Thirteenth Century: John Angelos and Queen Jelena" (PDF). Ungarn-Jahrbuch. 12 (1982–1983): München, 1984: 43–50.
- McDaniel, Gordon L. (1986). "The House of Anjou and Serbia". Louis the Great: King of Hungary and Poland. Boulder: East European Monographs. pp. 191–200. ISBN 9780880330879.
- Nicol, Donald M. (1984) [1957]. The Despotate of Epiros 1267–1479: A Contribution to the History of Greece in the Middle Ages (2. expanded ed.). Cambridge University Press. ISBN 9780521261906.
- Nicol, Donald M. (1993) [1972]. The Last Centuries of Byzantium, 1261–1453. Cambridge: Cambridge University Press. ISBN 9780521439916.
- Obolensky, Dimitri (1974) [1971]. The Byzantine Commonwealth: Eastern Europe, 500–1453. London: Cardinal. ISBN 9780351176449.
- Orbini, Mauro (1601). Il Regno de gli Slavi hoggi corrottamente detti Schiavoni. Pesaro: Apresso Girolamo Concordia.
- Орбин, Мавро (1968). Краљевство Словена. Београд: Српска књижевна задруга.
- Ostrogorsky, George (1956). History of the Byzantine State. Oxford: Basil Blackwell.
- Pavlovich, Paul (1989). The History of the Serbian Orthodox Church. Serbian Heritage Books. ISBN 9780969133124.
- Pavlowitch, Stevan K. (2002). Serbia: The History behind the Name. London: Hurst & Company. ISBN 9781850654773.
- Popović, Marko; Marjanović-Dušanić, Smilja; Popović, Danica (2016). Daily Life in Medieval Serbia. Belgrade: Clio & Institute for Balkan Studies. ISBN 9788671025256.
- Popović, Svetlana (2002). "The Serbian Episcopal Sees in the Thirteenth Century". Старинар (51: 2001): 171–184.
- Porčić, Nebojša (2016). "Information on Travel of Nemanjić Embassies: Content and Context". Balcanica (47): 97–118. doi:10.2298/BALC1647097P.
- Purković, Miodrag A. (1951). "Two Notes on Mediaeval Serbian History". The Slavonic and East European Review. 29 (73): 545–549. JSTOR 4204256.
- Peić, Sava (1994). Medieval Serbian Culture. London: Alpine Fine Arts Collection.
- Petković, Vesna; Peić, Sava (2013). Serbian Medieval Cultural Heritage. Belgrade: Dereta.
- Petrovitch, Nicolas (2015). "La reine de Serbie Hélène d'Anjou et la maison de Chaources". Crusades. 14: 167–182. doi:10.1080/28327861.2015.12220366. ISBN 9781472468413. S2CID 257002925.
- Popović, Svetlana (2002). "The Serbian Episcopal sees in the thirteenth century". Старинар (51: 2001): 171–184.
- Samardžić, Radovan; Duškov, Milan, eds. (1993). Serbs in European Civilization. Belgrade: Nova, Serbian Academy of Sciences and Arts, Institute for Balkan Studies. ISBN 9788675830153.
- Sedlar, Jean W. (1994). East Central Europe in the Middle Ages, 1000–1500. Seattle: University of Washington Press. ISBN 9780295800646.
- Soulis, George Christos (1984). The Serbs and Byzantium during the reign of Tsar Stephen Dušan (1331–1355) and his successors. Washington: Dumbarton Oaks Library and Collection. ISBN 9780884021377.
- Stanković, Vlada, ed. (2016). The Balkans and the Byzantine World before and after the Captures of Constantinople, 1204 and 1453. Lanham, Maryland: Lexington Books. ISBN 9781498513265.
- Stojkovski, Boris; Kartalija, Nebojša (2019). "Serbia through the eyes of contemporary western travelers in the age of Nemanjić Dynasty (1166–1371)" (PDF). Deseti međunarodni interdisciplinarni simpozijum Susret kultura: Zbornik radova. Novi Sad: Filozofski fakultet. pp. 305–321.
- Thallóczy, Lajos; Áldásy, Antal, eds. (1907). Magyarország és Szerbia közti összeköttetések oklevéltára 1198–1526. Budapest: Magyar Tudományos Akadémia.
- Todić, Branislav (1999). Serbian Medieval Painting: The Age of King Milutin. Belgrade: Draganić. ISBN 9788644102717.
- Uzelac, Aleksandar B. (2011). "Tatars and Serbs at the end of the Thirteenth Century". Revista de istorie Militara. 5–6: 9–20.
- Uzelac, Aleksandar B. (2015). "Foreign Soldiers in the Nemanjić State – A Critical Overview". Belgrade Historical Review. 6: 69–89.
- Vásáry, István (2005). Cumans and Tatars: Oriental Military in the Pre-Ottoman Balkans, 1185–1365. Cambridge: Cambridge University Press. ISBN 9781139444088.
