= Medieval Serbian law =

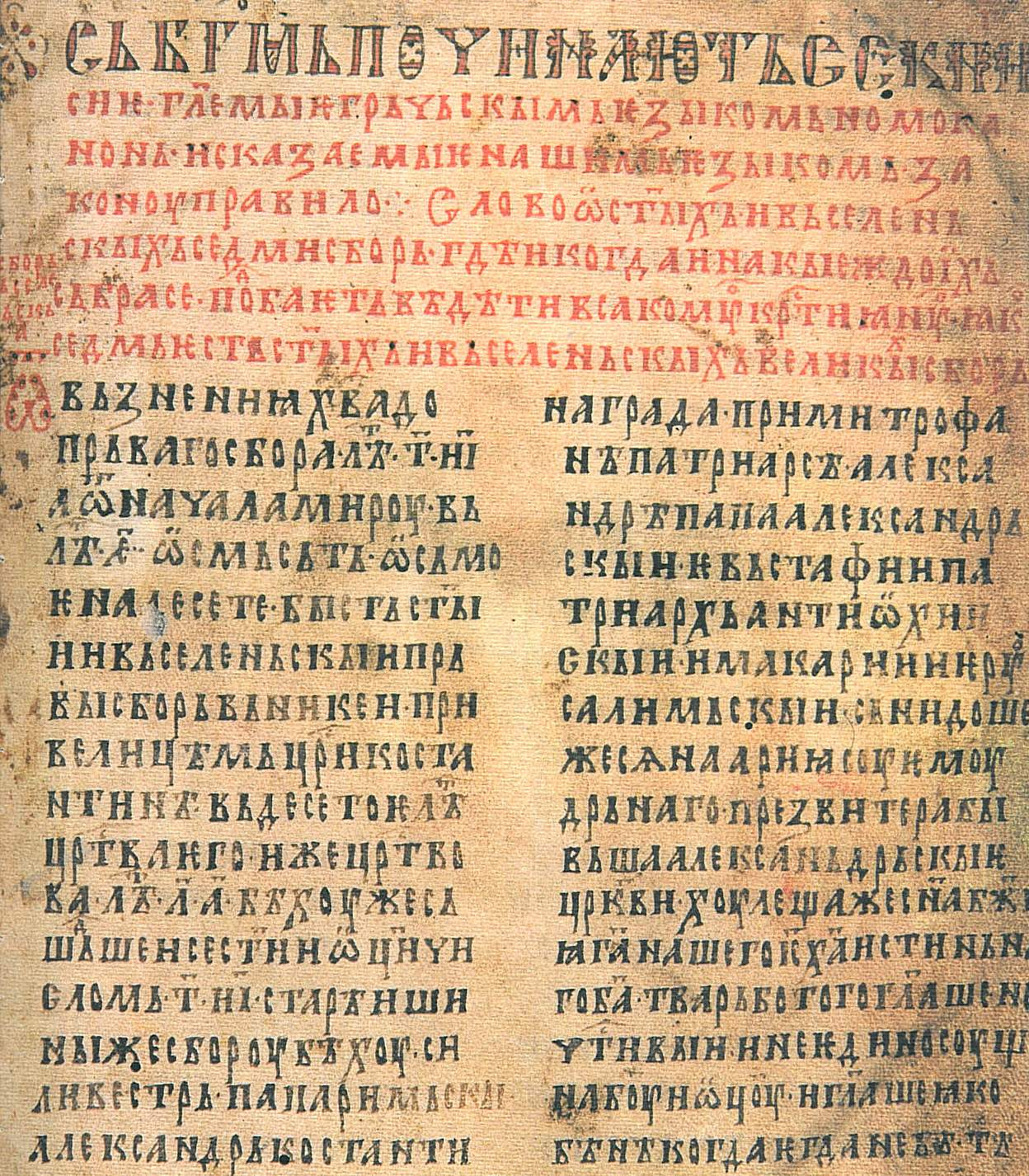
Archbishop Sava's Zakonopravilo (1262 manuscript of 1219 original).

Medieval Serbian law refers to the legislation used in the medieval Serbian states. From the 12th to 15th centuries (during the dynasties of Nemanjić, Lazarević and Branković) there is a relatively large collection of legal documents. All legal acts were created through the monarch's legislative activity, although with strong influence from neighbouring states and cities (the Byzantine Empire, first and foremost, Republic of Ragusa, Dalmatian cities, Republic of Venice, and partly the Kingdom of Hungary). Medieval Serbian legal sources may be divided into charters, international treaties, codes of law and city statutes.

The oldest known legal source is the monastery charter to Hilandar (1198–99) by Grand Prince Stefan Nemanja.

== Overview ==
=== Roman and Byzantine law ===
The Farmer's Law, Ekloge ton nomon and Procheiron had strong influence on Slavic law, particularly Serbian.

=== Customary law ===
The greatest part of Serbian medieval law can be studied through the customary law. As early as the end of the 12th century written law sources started to appear in the form of: charters, international treaties, codes of law and statutes. Among all sources, three of them hold the greatest significance: the Charter of Hilandar, the Nomocanon Zakonopravilo and Dušan's Code, which will be elaborated on below. Despite the existence of the written law, customary law has never been completely abandoned, as many customs from that era are performed even today, some to a lesser while others to a greater extent, while some have been incorporated into certain codes.

Although it is not known for certain whether there had been written legal sources in Serbia until the 12th century, customary law, as one of the sources, can be ascertain. Those customs are present even today, some to a lesser while others to a greater extent. In Serbia, customary law represents the most important legal source until the late 12th century, because it regulated how people lived. As can be guessed from its name, customary law is composed of customs, indicating what typical behaviour was supposed to be like according to unwritten rules traditionally rooted in a life of community or the whole nation. Numerous things were regulated by customary law, such as marriages and illicit relations, and customary law was also interwoven into criminal law. In Serbia customary law was in force until the late 19th century, and some instances of its application were noted even in the first half of the 20th century. The birth of written law meant that the application of customary law gradually declined in importance, but did not altogether cease to exist. All legal relationships not regulated by some written law were still regulated by customary law, while some customs were incorporated into the charters and Dušan's Code.

== Constitutions ==
=== Zakonopravilo ===
In the Byzantine empire, collections of laws were found in the "nomocanons" were collections of canon- and civil law, the Imperial codes of laws, while judicial experts interpreted various legal works. In Serbia, the Zakonopravilo of Archbishop Sava was compiled in 1219, using various Byzantine law collections. Its greatest part was devoted to criminal law. The work was also adopted in the Bulgarian and Russian Orthodox churches.

=== Soldier's Law ===
The Soldier's Law was a lost Serbian medieval legal code governing the warrior class, in use during the 13th century. Although the full text has not survived, it is known from references in King Stefan Milutin's charters (1299/1300 and 1315–1316). The law regulated the obligations of soldiers, requiring them to serve as cavalry and prohibiting the use of warhorses for transporting goods. It also applied to church soldiers, who were responsible for defending monastery estates while holding inherited or granted lands in return for military service.

=== Dušan's Code ===
Dušan's Code was adopted at the state council in Skopje on 21 May 1349. The first part contained 135 articles, the second part, 66 articles. As far as the content of this Code, divided in articles, is concerned, articles 1 to 38 constitute a separate section on the church, 39-63 are provisions for the rights and duties of the landed nobility, 64-83 are provisions for the legal position of the dependent commoner class (sebri), 118-122 for the city dwellers class and merchants, 125 and 126 for the criminal accountability of the city and city land, 129-132 and 135 for the responsibility of a soldier and the conduct during a war, 143 and from 145 until 149 are provisions describing sanctions against thieves and robbers, 151-154 are provisions for the jury, while the subject of legality is defined in articles 136-139 and 140-142, 171 and 172. In Dušan's Code there are more provisions of criminal, procedural and state law than those of church- and civil law.

== Other legal documents ==
=== International treaties ===
The survived international treaties were mostly concessions for foreign merchants and regulating the legal relationship. Such treaties, which strengthened the economic development of the country, were mostly signed with the Republic of Ragusa, and to a smaller extent with the Republic of Venice, as well as with some other countries. The peace treaty of Stefan Nemanja with Ragusa dated to 1186 is the oldest treaty preserved. At first, treaties were signed by both sides with a mutual pledge, but later, during the reign of king Stefan Dragutin, the treaties became one-sided grants of concessions, such as those to Venetian merchants. The main characteristics of these merchant treaties were the guarantee of freedom of movement for the merchants, compensation for the damage done, inviolability of the merchandise and total ban on reprisals. Adherence to those treaties resulted in a gradual emergence of some kind of an international law across Europe. The treaties also regulated some other important aspects, such as the customs duty the foreign merchants did not have to pay at first, which was later amended so they had to pay them at specially designated points. New duties were not introduced, as it was forbidden.

=== Charters ===
A charter is a document which serves the purpose of granting some rights or privileges, as Serbian rulers used to do by issuing them to the Church, landed nobility and sometimes even to the privileged cities. The Charter of Hilandar by Stefan Nemanja dating from 1198/1199 is the oldest Serbian legal written source. The Serbian monarchs wrote their charters in Slavic, and later, with the Serbian Empire, in Greek. They were written on paper or parchment, which was known to perish fast, as a result of which just a small number of charters have been preserved. A charter was composed of an introduction, body of the text and conclusion, while each of the parts mentioned contained its smaller parts. Charters can be classified as those relating to monasteries, cities and landed nobility, out of which the greatest number belonged to the category of monastery charters. Out of 165 monastery charters, the most important is the aforesaid Charter of Hilandar, which served as the basis for the foundation of the Hilandar Monastery. Nemanja's son, Stefan the First-Crowned endowed the Žiča monastery in 1220 and on two more occasions later with the charters whose text has been preserved on the monastery's walls thus bringing important information about marital law of that time to us. Some other important charters are: Skopje charter from 1299/1300, by which king Milutin confirmed the grants from the Byzantine and Bulgarian monarchs to Saint Đorđe Monastery near Skopje, the Banjska Charter from 1313–1318, by which king Milutin founded and endowed Banjska Monastery, king Milutin's charter for the Gračanica Monastery from 1312 was carved into an interior wall of the church, the Charters of Dečani were written in 1330 and 1343–1345, when king Stefan Dečanski provided grants for his legacy, the Charters of Prizren (1348–1353) was the means by which emperor Dušan endowed the Monastery of the Holy Archangels near Prizren. A dozen charters of the landed nobility has survived, while only one city charter has been preserved.

=== Statutes for maritime cities ===
The basic legal sources of the maritime communities such as Kotor, Budva, Skadar, Bar and Ulcinj were statutes. These included provisions stipulating the rights and obligations of the power holders, family law and law of wills, organization of authority, property law and law of contract, criminal law and court proceedings. The laws differed according to the city's level of autonomy. The statutes of Kotor, Budva and Skadar have been preserved.

=== Mining Code ===
Stefan Lazarević promulgated the Mining Code in 1412. That Code was intended for all miners and mines of Novo Brdo. As the citizens requested, Despot Stefan demanded that a body consisting of 24 people be formed. Their task was to draft a new law and submit it to Despot Stefan for its confirmation and issuance in the form of a charter. The aim of this Code was to ensure an efficient and undisturbed performance of mining activities. The first out of two parts of this Code had 51 articles regulating the right of ventilation and conducting air through other trenches as well as the relations related to the open cut mine and mine pits. The other one containing 22 articles stipulated taxes and duties. A large number of provisions had been transferred to a so-called Saxon law at the time of Suleiman the Magnificent’s rule (1520-1566) and these provisions were translated into the Ottoman Turkish language. There is a well preserved transcript of the Mining Code in the Latin alphabet dating back to the 17th century.

== Sources ==
- Blagojević, Miloš (2001). Државна управа у српским средњовековним земљама [State administration in the Serb medieval lands]. Službeni list SRJ.
- Đorđević, Aleksandar (2006). "Family Co-Operative in Serbian Medieval Law". Collection Papers Fac. L. Nis. 47: 123–.
- Marković, Biljana (2007). "Justinijanov zakon, srednjovekovna vizantijsko-srpska pravna kompilacija" [Justinian Law, Medieval Byzantine-Serbian Legal Compilation]. Beograd: SANU.
- Mirković, Zoran (2017). Српска правна историја (2 ed.). Службени гласник. ISBN 978-86-7630-677-0.
- Šarkić, Srđan (2023). "The Influence of Byzantine Law in East Central Europe". Lectures on East Central European Legal History (2 ed.). CEA: 43–71.
- Šarkić, Srđan (1996). Srednjovekovno srpsko pravo [Medieval Serbian law]. Matica srpska.
- Šarkić, Srđan (2015). "Утицај византијског права на средњовековно српско право" [The Influence of Byzantine Law on Serbian Medieval Law]. Slověne=Словѣне. International Journal of Slavic Studies. 4 (2).
- Šarkić, Srđan (2013). "Службености у византијском и српском средњовековном праву" [Servitudes in Byzantine and Serbian medieval law]. Zbornik radova Vizantoloskog instituta. 50 (2): 1003–1012.
- Šarkić, Srđan (2011). "Some Remarks concerning the Reception of Byzantine Law in Mediaeval Serbia". Annals Fac. L. Belgrade Int'l Ed.: 241–.
- Šarkić, Srđan (2010). "Правни положај властеле у средњовековној Србији" [Legal Position of Noblemen in Medieval Serbia]. Зборник радова Правног факултета у Новом Саду. 44 (1): 7–27.
- Šarkić, Srđan (2008). "Natural persons (individuals) and legal persons (entities) in Serbian medieval law". Zbornik radova Vizantološkog instituta. 45: 223–229.
- Šarkić, Srđan (2008). "Provisions of Roman Law on Dowry in Serbian Mediaeval Law". Zeitschrift der Savigny-Stiftung für Rechtsgeschichte. Romanistische Abteilung. 125 (1): 682–687.
- Šarkić, Srđan (2005). "The Concept of Will in Roman, Byzantine and Serbian Medieval Law". Forschungen zur byzantinischen Rechtsgeschichte. Fontes minores. 11: 427–433.
- Šarkić, Srđan (1986). "Norms of a Constitutional Character in the Serbian Medieval Law". Zbornik radova. 20: 45–.
- Šarkić, Srđan (1989). "Izvori srednjovekovnog Srpskog prava". Zbornik PFZ. 39: 184–.
- Šarkić, Srđan. "Elements of Constitutionality in Medieval Serbian Law". IUS COMMUNE. Zeitschrift für Europäische Rechtsgeschichte. 15: 43–55.
- Stojanović, Ljubomir (1890). "Стари српски хрисовуљи, акти, биографије, летописи, типици, noменици, записи и др". Споменик СКА. 3.
