= State assembly in medieval Serbia =

The origin of the state assembly in medieval Serbia dates back to tribal gatherings of armed soldiers. There, decisions concerning everyday life were made, including questions of organization, religion, the election of tribal elders and even the ruler himself. The role of the state assembly was of great importance when it came to the legalization of a new ruler, especially in the case of a violent change of ruler. The new ruler was supposed to have been chosen by the most notable representatives of the tribal aristocracy. During the 9th and 10th centuries, they were the backbone of this representative body. Over time, power relations between the members of this assembly changed and were contingent upon current events in the country.

Terms "Assembly of Serbia" or "The whole assembly of Serbia" referred to the assembly of the Serbian orthodox church, while the terms "assembly of the fathers" or "assembly of the Serbian land" always referred to the state assembly.

While Serbia gained power, her state institutions gained power as well. Among the first titles that rulers had was called „Great Župan“, while under him in the state hierarchy were aristocrats with the hereditary title of „Župan“. They were the representatives of the noble Serbian tribesmen. Warriors were also permitted to participate in the work of the assembly, only if the ruler asked them to do so. During the 12th and 13th centuries, representatives of the Raška episcopate, founded in 1020, started to participate.

== Composition and jurisdiction of the state assembly in the time of the Nemanjićs ==
=== Composition ===
The state assembly in the time of the Nemanjić dynasty was so influential that it was almost equated with the ruler himself. What matters were debated by the state assembly depended on the rulers initiative. Rules that shaped the way the matters were decided were influenced by customary law.

During the reign of Stefan Nemanja and his successors the assembly consisted of two classes : the nobility and the clergy. Every member of the nobility, also known as vlastela, with the exception of the vlasteličići, had the right to participate in the assembly since they were called upon by the ruler who also, other than deciding the matters to be debated, also chose the time and place of the assembly. The clergy chosen to participate in the assembly were the highest ranking of the Serbian orthodox church who were called upon by the head of the church. The rulers spouse, his mother and the heir to the throne also had the right to be present at the assembly as they were members of the royal family.

All participants were regularly invited through a written invitation. Even though the total sum of participants was never fixed, nor was it great, the number of nobles was greater than that of the clergymen. One of the reasons for this was the nobilities influence over the state assembly: they were the backbone of the army, together with the ruler they performed important state business and showed him political support. In this way, even though the ruler is the most important person in the state and the assembly, the ruler was to a certain extent limited by the interests of the nobility and that was the determining factor in choosing the matters to be debated by the assembly. Therefore, it can be said that the state assembly, under pressure from the nobility, to some extent limited the ruler's will. However, the total number of participants in the assembly was not particularly high : around 100 of the most prominent figures in the Serbian state.

=== Jurisdiction ===
The state assembly debated over:

• Changes on the throne (proclamation of the heir to the throne, coronation of a new ruler, the act of proclaiming a new ruler, the abandonment of the throne);

• Internal and foreign policy of the state (Matters of war and peace, conflicts among the heirs of the throne, elevation of the state to a higher rank);

• Legislation concerning the territory of the whole country (a notable example being Dušan's Code from 1349. and 1354. The code was accepted by the state assembly and officially confirmed by Emperor Uroš on a state assembly held in 1357.);

• The privileges and rights granted to the members of the government;

• Questions concerning the dynasty (establishment of ruler's endowments, canonization of deceased rulers)

Before making a decision, the ruler sought the opinion of the participants in the state assembly. This is because they were usually more informed about specific circumstances and the situation in the country. The issue that the state assembly necessarily debated was the election of the head of the Serbian Orthodox Church.

The assembly was held on the territory of the Serbian state. If the ruler was absent, and if something very urgent needed to be debated on the assembly, the ruler could be replaced by his wife in the work of the assembly.

== The state assembly in the time of Stefan Nemanja ==
The State Assembly has been convened even before the Nemanjić dynasty, although sources often mention it as a body that has only gained its prominence during their time. Furthermore, Stefan Nemanja, the founder of the dynasty, is presumed to have been crowned at the state assembly, which was convened to give legitimacy to that act, due to the fact that Stefan Nemanja, as he was not the eldest son, was not first in line to inherit the throne.

=== The first state assembly ===
During his reign (1166-1196), several state assemblies were held, primarily due to the ruler's decisions, which were often in contradiction with the principles on which customary law was based at the time, which required acceptance of such decisions by the representative body, the state assembly. The first assembly that Stefan Nemanja held after his ascension to the throne was held due to the ruler's intention to suppress the spread of heresy and to fight heretics. During this assembly, a young noblewoman married to a heretic was interviewed as a witness, whose testimony served as proof that heretics endanger the family as the basic building block of society, and thus the order of the state, which had to be prevented. However, as measures in the fight against heresy should have also been used against the actions of the ruler's subjects, which did not agree with customary law, the support of the state assembly was a necessary step in further suppression of heresy and Stefan Nemanja needed to use it. Over time, based on the evidence provided, the state assembly confirmed the ruler's proposal, and then began the suppression of heresy. These facts prove that this state assembly had a practical, not a ceremonial character, and that it held a debate before a decision was made.

=== The second state assembly ===
The state assembly was held in 1196. due to Stefan Nemanja's decision to leave the throne and thus the governance of the state to his middle son, Stefan Nemanjić, instead of Vukan Nemanjić, to whom the throne belonged according to the principle of primogeniture. This shows the importance and power of this representative body when it comes to its circle of jurisdiction and powers. Nemanjina's decision was not only in contradiction with the principles of customary law at the time, but also set a precedent in a political sense that could not be easily and rashly accepted. In other words, such a change threatened to ruin the stability of state order due to potential resistance from the nobility or the people. The ruler has held a state assembly so that he can have its political support on this side. On that occasion, the clergy, which this time had a lesser influence on the work of the assembly, was represented by the Bishop of Raška Kalinik, who turned Nemanja into a monk, while the representatives of the nobility were prominent members of the local administration, the Duke as military commanders and "soldiers", in addition to the ruler, his wife and sons. Nemanja's eldest son, Vukan, as a way of compensation for the loss of his right to the throne, was granted the title of "great prince" and a certain amount of land for him to govern, thus equating his position with that of "grand župan". This act was necessarily done in public to gain the support of the state assembly in order to reduce the chances of turmoil in the state.

=== The third state assembly ===
Nevertheless, the confirmation of the newly established order by the state assembly was no guarantee that the ruler's decision would be accepted in the long run. That's why, after he became a monk, even though that right was no longer formally his, Stefan Nemanja held the third and last state assembly during his reign to strengthen the new state order. Nemanjina's sons Stefan and Vukan attended the state assembly with their nobility, representatives of state administration and other prominent nobles. Even though, this state assembly did not prevent clashes and rifts between the two brothers for several years after the assembly was held.

== State assemblies in the time of Stefan Dušan ==
The biggest number of state assemblies during medieval Serbia were held during the reign of Serbia's greatest ruler, Stefan Dušan (1331-1355). Taking into consideration the fact that Dušan took the throne via a coup by defeating his father, Stefan Dečanski, it was of utmost importance for the new ruler to gain the support of prominent figures in the state for this act as soon as possible, that is, to legitimize the conducted coup at the state assembly as a representative body. It is for this reason that Stefan Dušan decided to gather the state assembly where he would be crowned. He informed Archbishop Danilo about that and then ordered him to "call the assembly of his fathers". In order to cement his position on the throne, that is, connections with the most influential people in the state, Stefan Dusan handed out ceremonial titles to all participants of the state assembly after the end of the coronation ceremony.

During his reign, Stefan Dusan gathered state assemblies for a number of issues. Its jurisdiction included issuing church charters and charters devoted to the nobility, taking care of the interests of the church, confirming old or bringing new privileges to both monasteries and nobility. All of this was done jointly with notable members who participated in the work of the state assembly and after consultations with the members of the ruler's family. Decisions were made on the basis of agreement, which was the standard way in which the state assembly in the time of Stefan Dušan operated.

== State assembly in the time of Stefan Lazarević ==
After the death of despot Stefan Lazarević the Serbian throne was left without an heir: Despot Stefan, namely, had no son nor heir on his father's side. To make the situation worse, inheritance from the mothers line wasn't allowed. Despite that, the state assembly in Srebrenica, held on this issue, decided that Đurađ Branković, Despot Stefans nephew, will succeed him . Even though it was clearly another precedent, which, while in conflict with the norms of customary law, was met with the support of the state assembly, the role and influence that this representative body indeed had when it came to the most important issues of the Serbian state, whose outcome depended heavily on it.

During the reign of despot Stefan, a large number of church-folk gatherings were held, which mostly had a ceremonial character. These assemblies were incentivized by Serbia's first archbishop, Sint Sava, to strengthen the cult of Saint Simeon, and over time, apart from being their mandatory participants, together with the Serbian state representatives, representatives of the Serbian orthodox church jointly organized it. That meant the strengthening of bonds in both ways: both the church and the state. Next to church-folk assemblies, smaller assemblies were held to commemorate church or monastery patron saints days.

== Serbian orthodox church and the state assembly ==
Of all the state assemblies held during Stefan Nemanja's rule, the presence and role of the clergy, that is, representatives of the Serbian church, as one of the classes with the right to participate in the assembly, is most notable at the first one. After gaining autocephaly and the strengthening of the Serbian Orthodox Church, the role of its representatives in the state assembly became greater.

Each of the classes played a determined role when it came to the functioning of the state assembly, so the church was mostly concerned with discussing issues of religious and moral character, and had no right to take away the ruler's power; That being said, the church had the sole right to crown the ruler in a special, church rite and thus declare him ruler. Thus, archbishop Sava, after the violent overthrow of king Radoslav by his younger brother Vladislav, conscious of the pressure of the nobility and the fact that the state assembly previously, like in the instance of his father Stefan Nemanja, agreed to legitimize this act, performed the rite of coronation of the new king.

Towards the end of the 14th century, the archbishop participated in the state assembly on the side of the clergy alongside 14 bishops, 14 hegumen and sometimes some notable monks.

== The assembly in Serbia and stanak in Bosnia ==
The state assembly in Serbia and stanak, as this body was called in Bosnia have both similarities as well as differences. When it comes to similarities, both bodies were gathered by the ruler. In addition, both the assembly and the stanak consisted of both of great and small (ordinary) vlastela. Representatives of the clergy did not participate in the work of the stanak because their teachings contradicted the feudal system. Finally, both bodies served as great pressure on the ruler.

However, when it comes to Bosnia, it seems that the stanak had significantly more constrained the ruler than the state assembly in Serbia. Namely, given that Bosnia was an electoral monarchy, this claim is completely justified: not only was the nobility (as in Serbia) who participated in the work of the stanak, the backbone of the military, but it had the power to elect and overthrow the ruler based upon its status. While in medieval Serbia the ruler was the one who had the right to take land from a noble in the case of infidelity, in Bosnia the ruler only had the right to suggest such and action, while the decision was made by the stanak. All of this is a testament to the great power of the stanak in comparison to the Serbian state assembly.

== See also ==
- Stanak
- Medieval Serbian nobility

== Literature ==
- Мирковић, Зоран (2019). Српска правна историја., Београд. Правни факултет Универзитета у Београду.
- Благојевић, Милош (2008). Српски сабори и сабори отачаства Немањића и Лазаревића., Глас CDH Српске академије наука и уметности. Одељење историјских наука, књ. 14 - 2008
