= Slavery in Serbia =

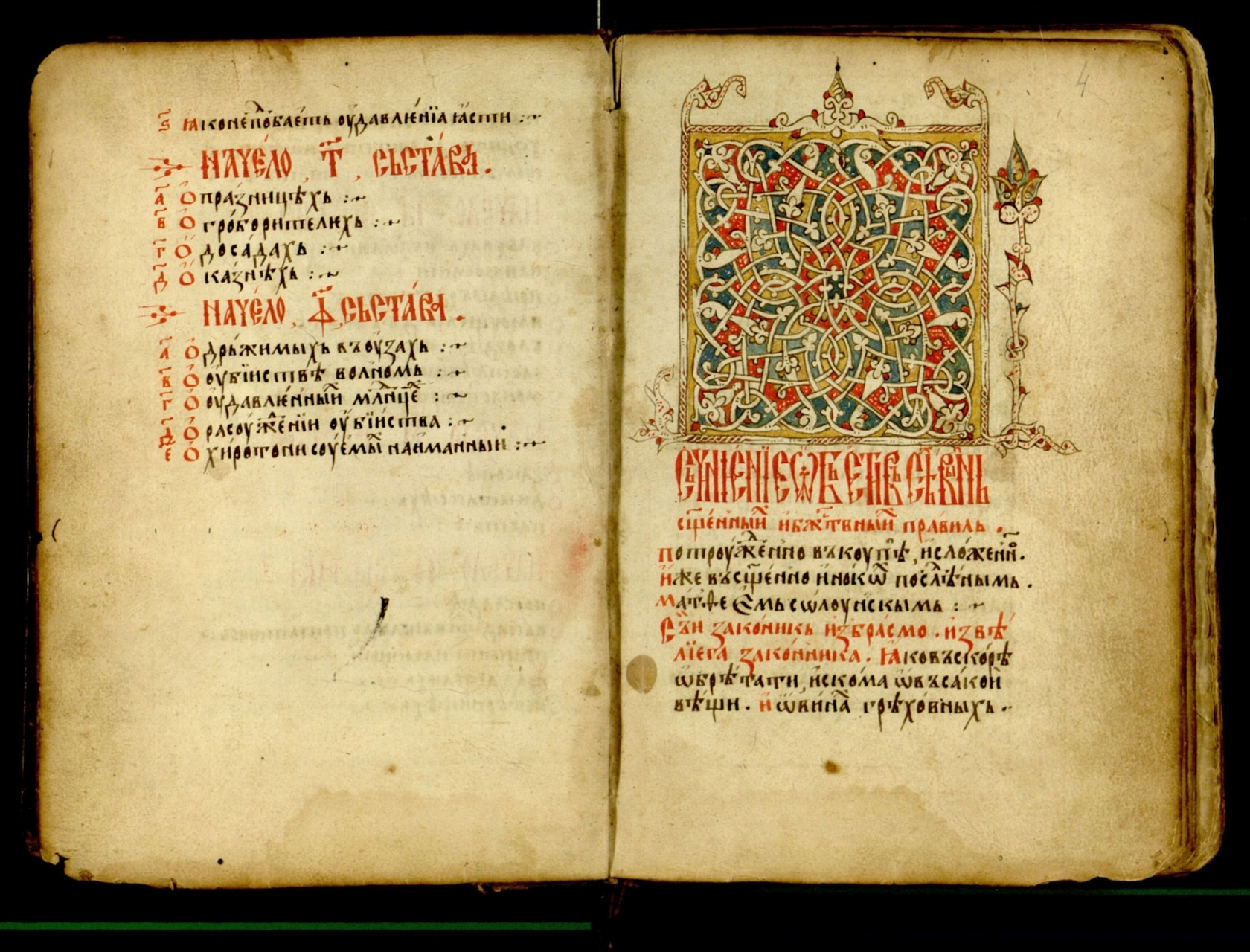
Dušan Code, the second oldest preserved Serbian proto-constitution

"The Proclamation of Dušan's Law Codex" by Paja Jovanović

Slavery in Serbia refer to the history of slavery in the area that was later to form the nation of Serbia.

In Ancient Serbia, the institution of slavery in the area was a part of the history of slavery in the Roman Empire. During the early middle ages, Serbia was subjected to the laws of the Byzantine Empire. During the later part of the middle ages, Serbia was independent and regulated slavery by its own laws.

During the Ottoman conquest of the Balkans, Serbia became a religious and political border zone between Christian Europe and the Islamic Ottoman Empire, and as a consequence the Serbs was termed as infidels kafir of Dar al-Harb and vulnerable to Ottoman slave raids and slave trading. During the Ottoman era, slavery was legal in accordance to Islamic law. As a non-Muslim province, Serbia was also subjected to the blood tax of tributary slaves to the Ottoman Empire. The Ottoman era in Serbia ended in 1804, after which Ottoman law was no longer applicable.

== History ==
During the temure of Roman rule in Ancient Serbia, slavery was regulated in accordance with the laws of slavery in the Roman Empire.

=== Byzantine rule ===
Serbia was under the rule of the Byzantine Empire from the 4th century to the 7th century. During this time period, the institution of slavery in Serbia was regulated by the laws governing the institution of slavery in the Byzantine Empire. During the Byzantine campaign against the Pagan tribes on Balkan in the 10th century, slavery in the Byzantine Empire reached it maximum, when it was supplied by Pagan war captives.

While slavery in the Byzantine Empire was never formally abolished, it was gradually phased out in favor of serfdom by the landowners in the countryside, which eventually reduced slavery to become a marginal urban phenomena after the 10th century onward.

=== Middle ages ===
During the middle ages, the institution of slavery in the Serbian Empire was regulated by the Law code of Stefan Dušan (r. 1346-1355).

The slaves were referred to by the term otroks. Under the Serbian rule, when the new Serbian system replaced the prior Byzantine societal classes, the otrok peasants replaced the Byzantine douparokoi-serfs. The otroks were described as peasants who cultivated the land of the landowners, but they could also be educated to perform various forms of handicrafts in the cities. The otroks could be sold, bought and owned.

=== Ottoman Serbia ===
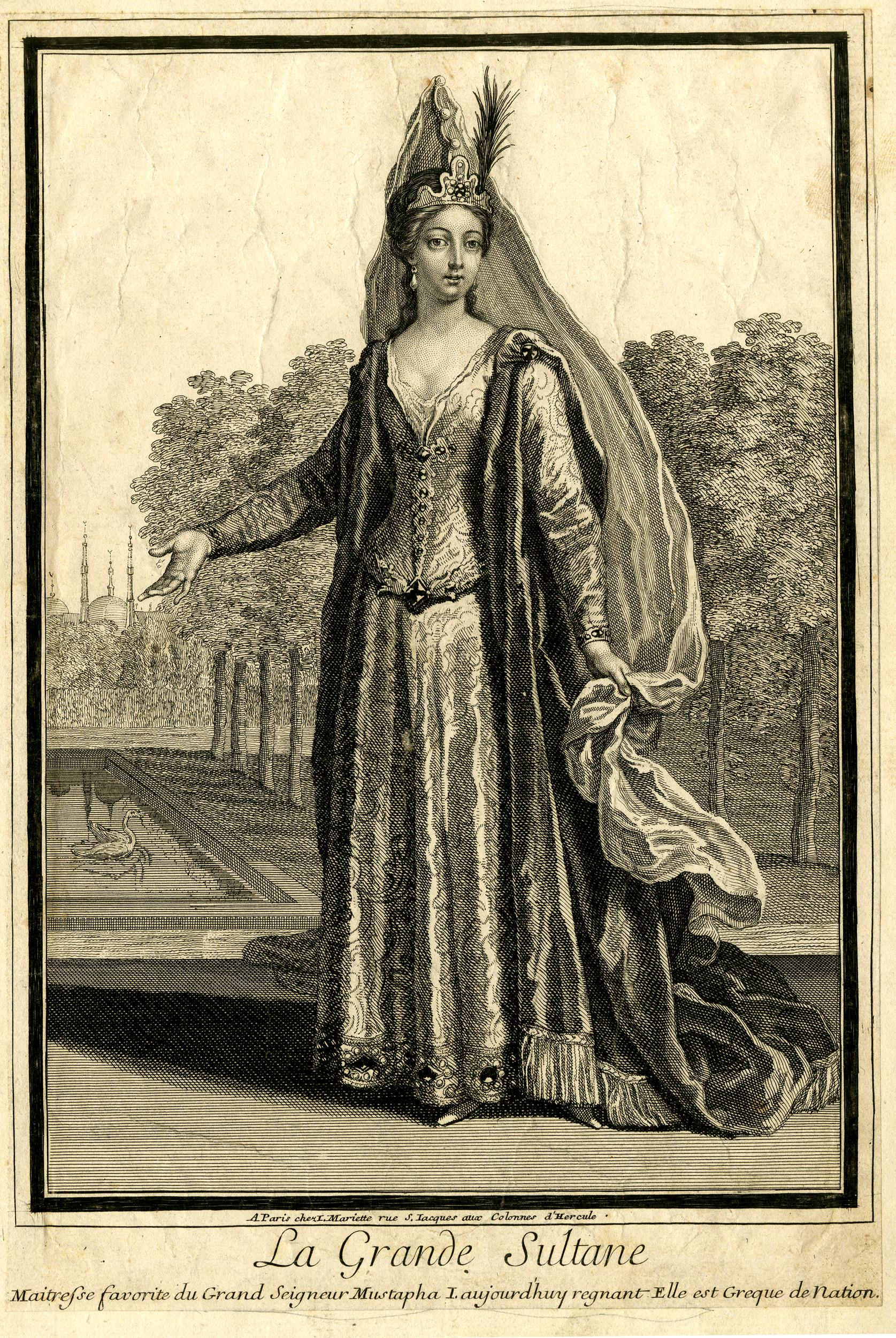
Portrait of Valide and Mustafa II's wife Saliha Sebkati Sultan

During the time period when Serbia was a province of the Ottoman Empire, the practice of slavery in Ottoman Serbia (1459-1804) was governed by the Islamic law, that regulated the institution of slavery in the Ottoman Empire.

Ottoman Serbia was subjected to Ottoman law. Slavery in the Ottoman Empire was regulated by the Seriat, the religious Islamic Law, and by the secular Sultan's law Kanun, which was essentially supplementary regulations to facilitate the implementation of the Seriat law. The Islamic law regarding Islamic views on slavery legitimized enslavement by purchase of already enslaved people from middleman slave traders; by children born from two enslaved parents or from a slave mother without an acknowledged father; or by enslaving war captives, specifically kafir of Dar al-Harb, that is non-Muslims from non-Muslim lands, with whom Muslims of Dar al-Islam (the Muslim world) were by definition always in a state of war. A Muslim man was by law entitled to have sexual intercourse with his female slave (concubinage in Islam) without this being defined as extramarital sex (zina); if he chose to acknowledge paternity of a child with her the child would become free, and his mother would become umm walad and manumitted on the death of her enslaver; but if he did not acknowledge paternity both the child and mother would remain slaves, continuing the line of slavery.

As in other non-Muslim Ottoman provinces in the Balkans, Serbia was subjected to the blood tax of slaves known as the Devshirme system. The system had been introduced by Murad II, and was imposed upon the Christian provinces of the Balkans when the Ottomans felt a need to increase their slave supply of Palace state slaves or slave soldier (janissaries). When the Ottomans needed to increase their slave supply, Ottoman officials travelled to Christian villages, demanded a list from the village priest of the baptised boys of the village, and selected one son from each family: boys that were healthy, intelligent, uncircumcised and beautiful were prioritized for selection. There are claims of very poor families who villingly offered their children, but in general, Christian families tried to avoid having their children taken as slaves. Boys taken during this system were subjected to a long training during which they became Islamicized and fostered to loyalty to the Sultan. The official Devshirme system was however not the only way in which non-Muslims could be enslaved in the province. Ottoman governors and officials are known to have supplied the Ottoman slave market also with non-Muslim slave girls. Şehsuvar Sultan and Saliha Sultan (mother of Mahmud I) were reportedy among the most known examples of the people enslaved in Serbia.

Chattel slavery remained legal in the Ottoman Empire, and consequently legal in Serbia, until the end of Ottoman rule and the formation of the Principality of Serbia in 1804.

== See also ==
- Balkan slave trade
- Venetian slave trade
