= Dušan's Code =

14th-century Serbian set of laws

Dušan's Code Душанов законик
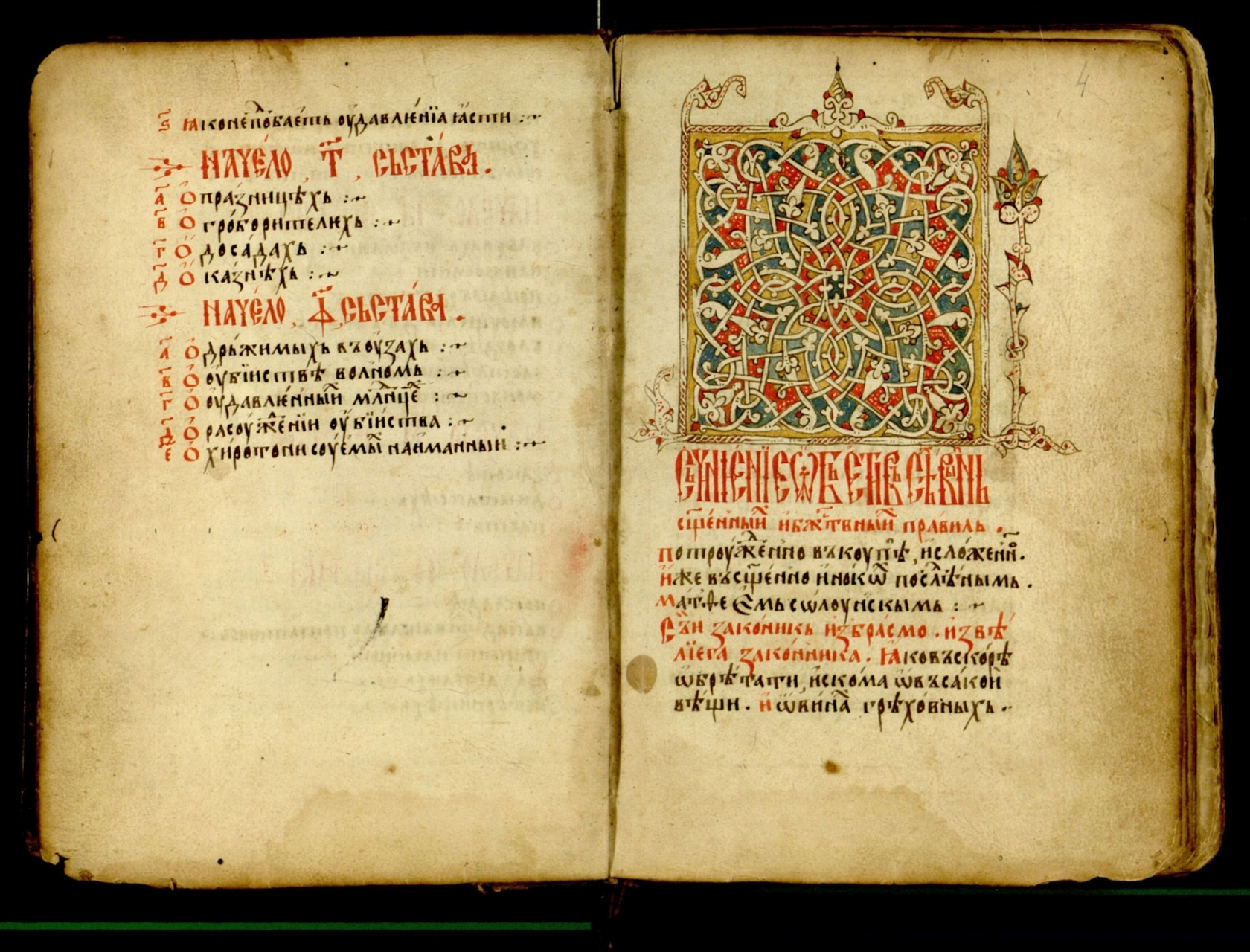
- Prizren Manuscript of Dušan's Code, 15th century
- Created: 1349
- Author: Serbian Emperor Stefan Dušan
- Purpose: Constitution (Code)

Dušan's Code (Serbian: Душанов законик, romanized: Dušanov zakonik, known historically as Законь благовѣрнаго цара Стефана – Law of the pious Emperor Stefan) is a compilation of several legal systems that was enacted by Stefan Uroš IV Dušan of Serbia in 1349. It drew upon Roman law, Byzantine law, as well as elements of customary and canon law. It was used in the Serbian Empire and the succeeding Serbian Despotate. It is considered an early constitution, or close to it; an advanced set of laws which regulated all aspects of life such as family relations, property rights, contracts, and crimes.

== Background ==
On 16 April 1346 (Easter), Dušan convoked a huge assembly at Skopje, attended by the Serbian Archbishop Joanikije II, the Archbishop of Ochrid Nikolaj I, the Bulgarian Patriarch Simeon and various religious leaders of Mount Athos. The assembly and clerics agreed on, and then ceremonially performed the raising of the autocephalous Serbian Archbishopric to the status of Serbian Patriarchate. The Archbishop from then on was titled Serbian Patriarch, although one document called him Patriarch of Serbs and Greeks, with the seat at the Monastery of Peć. The first Serbian Patriarch Joanikije II now solemnly crowned Dušan as "Emperor and autocrat of Serbs and Romans" (Greek Bασιλεὺς καὶ αὐτoκράτωρ Σερβίας καὶ Pωμανίας).

== History ==
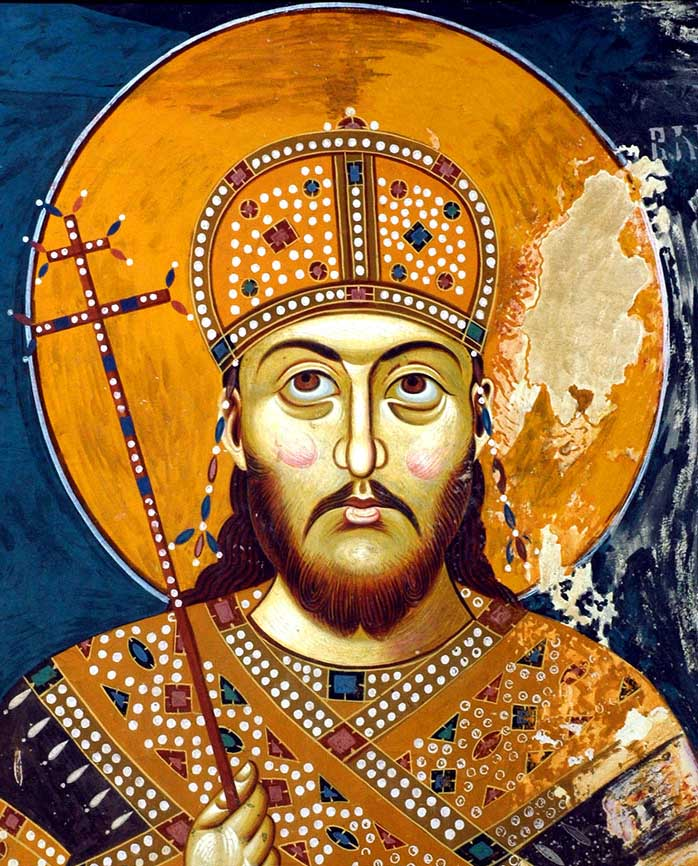
Fresco detail of Serbian Emperor Stefan Dušan.

The Code was promulgated at a state council on 21 May 1349 in Skopje, the capital of the Serbian Empire. The foreword is as follows: "We enact this Law by our Orthodox Synod, by His Holiness the Patriarch Kir Joanikije together with all the Archbishops and Clergy, small and great, and by me, the true-believing Emperor Stefan, and all the Lords, small and great, of this our Empire". In the Charter, which accompanied the Code, it said: "It is my desire to enact certain virtues and truest of laws of the Orthodox faith to be adhered to and observed". Emperor Dušan added a series of articles to it in 1353 or 1354, at a council in Serres. This second part was half the size and at times cited issues from the first part, referring it to the "first Code".

It had a total of 201 articles. Four of them (79, 123, 152, 153), regarding various subjects, refers to the authority of the "Law of the Sainted King" (i.e. Stefan Uroš II Milutin of Serbia, r. 1282–1321, Dušan's grandfather), which suggests that Milutin had issued a code whose text has not survived. Dušan's Code was thus a supplement to Milutin Code, as well as a supplement to the various Church law codes that also had authority in Serbia; in particular the Nomocanon of Saint Sava (Zakonopravilo), enacted in 1219 with the establishment of the Serbian Orthodox Church and Serbian Kingdom. The Syntagma Canonum, written in 1335 by Matthew Blastares, had been translated into Serbian and had received legal authority by 1349, and its articles had influenced the text of the Code. Dušan's Code was heavily influenced by Byzantine law – nearly half of its articles reflect some influence, often modified for Serbia. The code had many articles concerning the Church, which reflects Byzantine Church law; Byzantine civil law codes, especially the late-9th-century compilation by Basil I and Leo VI, also influenced the code. Scholars A. Solovjev and Soulis conclude that the Council of 1349 issued a three-part comprehensive legal document, since most early manuscripts of the Code also contain two other texts: The first part was an abridgement of the Syntagma, the second part was the so-called "Code of Justinian" (a short compilation of Byzantine legal rules, mostly taken from the Farmer's Law, not to be confused with the Code that is part of the Corpus Juris Civilis), and the third part was always Dušan's Code itself. According to Fine, there is a possibility that the Code was written to supplement the first two parts, by adding items that were not covered, rather than to build a comprehensive legal system.

== Composition ==
The first part, the Syntagma, was an encyclopedic legal collection, provided in alphabetical order. It drew from religious and secular law; ecclesiastical articles made up a majority of the Byzantine original. The version of Dušan's manuscripts contained only a third of the original Greek version; it omitted most of the ecclesiastical material and contained mainly secular articles; Serbia already had an ecclesiastical code made by Saint Sava called the Nomokanon or Zakonopravilo. The secular articles of the abridged Serbian version of the Syntagma were drawn chiefly from Basil I's law code and the Novella's of Emperors who succeeded him; they focused on laws governing contracts, loans, inheritance, marriage, dowries etc. as well as on matters of criminal law. The second part, the Law of Justinian, was actually a shortened version of the 8th-century Farmer's Law, a code settling problems and disputes among peasants within a village.

The third part, Dušan's Code, added what was not covered in the other two parts and specific Serbian situations. Since aspects of civil and criminal law were well covered in the two parts, Dušan's articles concerned with public law and legal procedures. The Code also provided more material on actual punishments; in which there is a strong Byzantine influence, with executions and mutilations frequently replacing Serbia's traditional fines. It touched on crimes or insults and their punishment; settlement of civil suits (including ordeals and selection and role of juries); court procedure and judicial jurisdictions (defining which cases to be judged by which bodies among Church courts, the Emperor's court, courts of the Emperor's circuit judges, and judgement by a nobleman); and rights and obligations, including the right to freely carry out commerce (articles 120, 121), tax obligations (summary tax and timeframe to pay), grazing rights and their violation, service obligations to the Emperor, exemption from state dues (usually for the Church), obligations associated with land, and the obligation of the Church to perform charity.

The code also defined the different types of landholding (specifying the various rights and obligations that went with various categories of land), the rights of inheritance, the position of slaves, and the position of serfs. It defined the labor dues serfs owed to their lords (article 68) but also gave them the right to lay plaint against their master before the Emperor's court (article 139). The code also noted the special privileges of foreign communities (e.g. the Saxons).

Many articles regarded the Church status, thus supplementing the existing canon law texts. The Church received a very privileged position, on the whole, though it was given the duty of charity in no uncertain terms: "And in all churches the poor shall be fed ... and should any one fail to feed them, be he Metropolitan, bishop, or abbot, he shall be deprived of his office" (article 28). The code also banned simony. A clear-cut separation of Church and state was established in most matters, allowing Church courts to judge the Church's people and prohibiting the nobility from interfering with Church property and Church matters.

Dušan's Code did not look favorably upon the Catholic Church, though he, as his predecessors, was friendly and respectable to foreign Catholics (Saxons and coastal merchants). He referred to the Roman Catholic Church as the "Latin heresy" and to its adherents as "half believers." He prohibited proselytism by Catholics among the Orthodox, Orthodox conversions to Catholicism, and mixed marriages between Catholics and Orthodox unless the Catholic converted to Orthodoxy. He also had articles strongly penalizing "heretics" (Bogomils). Only the Orthodox were called Christians.

The code defined and allowed court procedure, jurisdictions, and punishment to depend upon the social class of the individual involved, supporting the existing class structure. Articles touched on the status in society and in court of clergy, nobility, commoners, serfs, slaves, Albanians and Vlachs (the latter two for their pastoralist lifestyle, than for ethnic reasons), and foreigners. The Code also guaranteed the authority and income of the state; it contained articles on taxes, obligations associated with land, and services and hospitality owed to the Emperor and his agents. Greek, "Latin" or Italian, Ragusan, Bulgarian, Vlach, Albanian and Serbian merchants can freely trade without interference and in transit they are free to transfer their goods.

Articles like the ones just cited [Article 158] are also valuable sources on Serbian social history. However, they must be used with caution. For a series of laws is not the same type of source as a visitor's description of a society. A law code does not describe how things actually functioned but only how they ought to have functioned. In some cases articles may have been based on customary laws; in such cases the articles' contents were probably generally observed or practiced and thus can be taken as evidence about actual practices and conditions. However, an article could also reflect an innovation, a reform the ruler was trying to bring about through legislation. In this case it would not have reflected existing customs and we must then ask, was the ruler successful in realizing his reform or did it remain a dead letter? Thus a law code may at times more accurately depict an ideal than reality. And since certain—perhaps many—articles in Dusan's code may have been attempts to legislate change, attempts which may or may not have been successful (and even if successful in one place, possibly not in others), we must always be careful and avoid leaping to the conclusion that this or that article describes the way things were done in fourteenth-century Serbia.

— John Van Antwerp Fine, author of The Late Medieval Balkans.

The Code also maintained law and order, not limiting itself against crime and insults, but also gave responsibility to specific communities; it stated the existing custom that each territory was responsible and liable for keeping order; e.g. a frontier lord was responsible for defending his border: "if any foreign army come and ravish the land of the Emperor, and again return through their land, those frontier lords shall pay all [the people] through whose territory they [the army] came." (Article 49). The control of brigands, a constant problem in the Balkans, was also widely addressed in articles 126, 145, 146, 158 and 191. Article 145 says: "In whatsoever village a thief or brigand be found, that village shall be scattered and the brigand shall be hanged forthwith ... and the headmen of the village shall be brought before me [the Emperor] and shall pay for all the brigand or thief hath done from the beginning and shall be punished as a thief and a brigand." and continues in article 146, "also prefects and lieutenants and bailiffs and reeves and headmen who administer villages and mountain hamlets. All these shall be punished in the manner written above [article 145] if any thief or brigand be found in them." And article 126 states, "lf there be a robbery or theft on urban land around a town, let the neighborhood pay for it all." And finally article 158 requires that the localities bordering on an uninhabited hill jointly supervise that region and pay for damage from any robbery occurring there. Fine concludes that these articles demonstrate a weakness in the state's maintaining of order in rural and border areas, which caused it to pass responsibility down to local inhabitants, by threatening them with penalties, the state hoped to force the locality to assume this duty. Another reason for the strictness of the articles towards the locality was the belief that the brigand could not survive without local support, shelter, and food. Thus the brigand was seen as a local figure, locally supported, preying on strangers. As a result, the allegedly supporting locality shared his guilt and deserved to share the punishment. The strict articles were therefore intended to discourage a community from aiding brigands.

The monarch had wide autocratic powers, but was surrounded and advised by a permanent council of magnates and prelates. The court, chancellery and administration were rough copies of those of Constantinople. The Code named the administrative hierarchy as following: "lands, cities, župas and krajištes", the župas and krajištes were one and the same, with the župas on the borders were called krajištes ("frontier march"). The župa consisted of villages, and their status, rights and obligations were regulated in the constitution. The ruling nobility possessed hereditary allodial estates, which were worked by dependent sebri, the equivalent of Greek paroikoi; peasants owing labour services, formally bound by decree. The earlier title of župan was abolished and replaced with the Greek kephale (kefalija, "head, master").

The legal transplanting is notable with the articles 171 and 172, which regulated juridical independence, taken from Basilika (book VII, 1, 16–17).

=== Peasants ===
Dušan's Code is one of few sources on the position of Serbia's peasants.

Commoners shall have no council. If anybody is found participating in council, let his ears be cut off, and let the leaders be singed.

— On the Commoners Council

One aspect is the treatment of the position and rights of Serbia's peasants. In the context of the medieval social structure, peasants were the commoners who engaged in agricultural work and formed a substantial part of the population. Commoners, who were the peasants, were not allowed to form or participate in any council. Those found to be involved in any council-related activities were subjected to severe punishment. The code prescribes that the punishment for participating in a council would be cutting off the offender's ears, while the leaders or organizers of such councils would be subjected to singeing.

== Legacy ==
Proglašenje Dušanovog zakonika (The Proclamation of Dušan's Law Codex), Paja Jovanović, oil on canvas, 1900, National Museum of Serbia

The code continued as the constitution under the rule of Dušan's son, Stefan Uroš V, and during the fall of the Serbian Empire, it was used in all provinces. It was officially used in the successor state, Serbian Despotate, until its annexation by the Ottoman Empire in 1459. The code was used as a reference for Serbian communities under Turkish rule, which exercised considerable legal autonomy in civil cases. The code was used in the Serbian autonomical areas under the Republic of Venice, like Grbalj and Paštrovići.

Noel Malcolm has argued that an article in Dušan's Code can be considered speculatively as an early attempt to clamp down on the self-administered Albanian customary law of the mountains (Kanun), and if so, this would be an early evidence that such customary laws were in effect.

Dušan's Code regulated all social spheres, thus it is considered the second oldest preserved constitution of Serbia. The original manuscript is not preserved, but around twenty copies of the transcript, ranging from the 14th to the 18th century, remain.

== Manuscripts ==
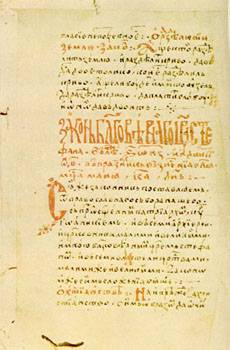
Hilandar manuscript

The Popović family from Dvoran, which generated 18 or 21 generations of village priests, were important in the preservation of medieval Serbian literature: they had the Charter of Our Lady of Ljeviš, written by Serbian King Stefan Dečanski (r. 1321–1331), in their direct property; the Russian consul in Prizren, Jastrebov, found it at the house of the last descendant of the family, Jovan Dvoranac Popović in Prizren, who gave it to the Serbian Academy of Sciences and Arts. It is believed that one of the forefathers of the family was the elder of the Saint Archangels Monastery (Dušan's endowment) near Prizren, and that he during the Ottoman times managed to transfer the valuable texts to the church in his village of Dvorane. In 1779, priest Partenije Popović became a monk of the Saint Mark Koriški Monastery, to where he brought several important books. In 1859, Prizren teacher Nikola Musulin found the Dušan's Code there, and in 1860 the Saint Archangels Charter was found in the St. Nicholas Church in the village of Korishë.

Today 24 manuscripts of Dusan's Code are known. The oldest extant is the Struga manuscript from 1373; which is not preserved in full; only 100 articles remain. The Athos and Studenica manuscripts date from around 1418. The Hilandar, Bistrica and Prizren manuscripts, which have the most complete texts, date to the 15th century. The Rakovac manuscript, dating to around 1700, comprises only the last 12 articles and the Emperor's comments.

== Quotes ==
On the Law
Further commandeth our Imperial Majesty:
Should our Imperial Majesty write a letter
Out of wrath, or out of love
Or out of mercy for any one,
And should such a letter contravene the Code
And be at variance with the law and justice
As set down in the Code,
The judges
Shall not comply therewith
But shall judge
And act withal as justice commandenth.

On Poor Women
Any poor woman unable to litigate
Or defend herself shall choose an attorney
Who shall speak on her behalf.
The poorest hemp-spinstress shall be as free as a priest shall.

On Prisoners
Whoso escapeth from prison to the Imperial Court, be he a serf of the Crown, or of the Church, or of a nobleman, shall by the act itself be set free; should he be bearing any gifts for the man to whom he hath escaped, he shall return them to the man from whom he hath escaped.
Whoso escapeth from the prison at our Imperial Court to the patriarchal court shall be set free; also shall be set free any man who escapeth from the patriarchal prison to the Imperial Court.
Also, should any one give shelter to a man from a foreign land, and that man be a fugitive from his master or from justice holding our imperial letter of clemency, said letter shall not be contested; should he hold no such letter, he shall be returned wherefrom he hath escaped.

== See also ==
- Medieval Serbian law

== Sources ==
- Angelini, Paolo (2012). "The Code of Dušan, 1349–1354". Tijdschrift voor Rechtsgeschiedenis. 80 (1–2): 77–93. doi:10.1163/157181912x626920.
- Batrićević, Ana (December 22, 2006). Legal Transplants and the Code of Serbian Tsar Stephan Dushan: A Comparative Study. doi:10.2139/ssrn.953277. SSRN 953277.
- Bubalo, Đorđe (2013). "A prolusion on the history of the text of Dušan's Code". Zbornik radova Vizantološkog instituta. 50 (2): 725–740. doi:10.2298/ZRVI1350725B.
- Bubalo, Đorđe (2015). "The Era of Dušan's Code". Slověne=Словѣне. International Journal of Slavic Studies. 4 (2): 119–146.
- Bubalo, Đorđe (2010). Dušanov zakonik. Beograd. pp. 72–73.
- Burr, Malcolm (November 1949). "The Code of Stephan Dušan: Tsar and Autocrat of the Serbs and Greeks". The Slavonic and East European Review. 28 (70): 198–217. JSTOR 4204107.
- Ćirković, Sima M. (2004). The Serbs. Wiley-Blackwell. ISBN 0-631-20471-7.
- Fine, John Van Antwerp Jr. (1994), The Late Medieval Balkans: A Critical Survey from the Late Twelfth Century to the Ottoman Conquest, University of Michigan Press, ISBN 978-0-472-08260-5
- Hupchick, Dennis P. (1995). Conflict and chaos in Eastern Europe. Palgrave Macmillan. ISBN 978-0-312-12116-7.
- Kazhdan, Alexander, ed. (1991), Oxford Dictionary of Byzantium, Oxford University Press, ISBN 978-0-19-504652-6
- Kršljanin, Nina (2012). "Class inequality in the penal law of Dušan's Code". Strani pravni život. 3: 41–68.
- Nicol, Donald MacGillivray (1993). The Last Centuries of Byzantium, 1261–1453. Cambridge: Cambridge University Press. ISBN 0-521-43991-4.
- Novaković, Stojan (1898). "Zakonik Stefana Dušana". Belgrade. (Public Domain)
- Malcolm, Noel (1998). Kosovo: A short history. Washington Square, New York: New York University Press. p. 54. ISBN 0-8147-5598-4.
- Mošin, V. (1949). "Studenički rukopis – povodom šestogodišnjice Dušanova zakonika Vlastareva sintagma i Dušanov zakonik u Studeničkom 'Otečniku'". Starine JAZU.
- Novaković, S. (2004). Zakonik Stefana Dušana, cara srpskog 1349–1354. Beograd.
- Radovanović, Milovan (2002). "Šar mountain and its župas in South Serbia's Kosovo-Metohia region: Geographical position and multiethnic characteristics". Zbornik radova Geografskog instituta "Jovan Cvijić" (51). SANU: 7–22. doi:10.2298/IJGI0251007R.
- Radovanović, Milovan (2008). "Kosovo i Metohija: antropogeografske, istorijskogeografske, demografske i geopolitičke osnove". Službeni glasnik.
- Sedlar, Jean W. (1994). East Central Europe in the Middle Ages, 1000–1500. Vol. III. Seattle: University of Washington Press. ISBN 0-295-97290-4.
- Soulis, George Christos (1995). The Serbs and Byzantium during the reign of Emperor Stephen Dušan (1331–1355) and his successors. Dumbarton Oaks. ISBN 0-88402-137-8.
- Sindik, I. (1951). "Dušanovo zakonodavstvo u Paštrovićima i Grblju". Zbornik u čast šeste stogodišnjice Zakonika cara Dušana (I). Beograd: SANU: 119–182.
- Soloviev, Alexander
  - Selected Monuments of Serbian Law from the 12th to 15th centuries (1926)
  - Legislation of Stefan Dušan, Emperor of Serbs and Greeks (1928)
  - Dušan's Code in 1349 and 1354 (1929)
- Wilhelm-Stempin, Nikolaus (2009). Das albanische Gewohnheitsrecht aus der Perspektive der rechtlichen Volkskunde. München: GRIN Verlag. ISBN 978-3-640-40128-4.
- Zorić, Petar (2006), Законоправило Светога Саве и правни транспланти (PDF) (in Serbian), Alan Watson, archived from the original (PDF) on September 30, 2011
- Golijan, Dragan, and Vladan Stanković. "Dušan's Code-The Act Constitutional Nature And Foundation Of The Serbian State." International Journal of Economics & Law 13 (2015): 30–34.
