= Golden Bull of 1213 (German) =

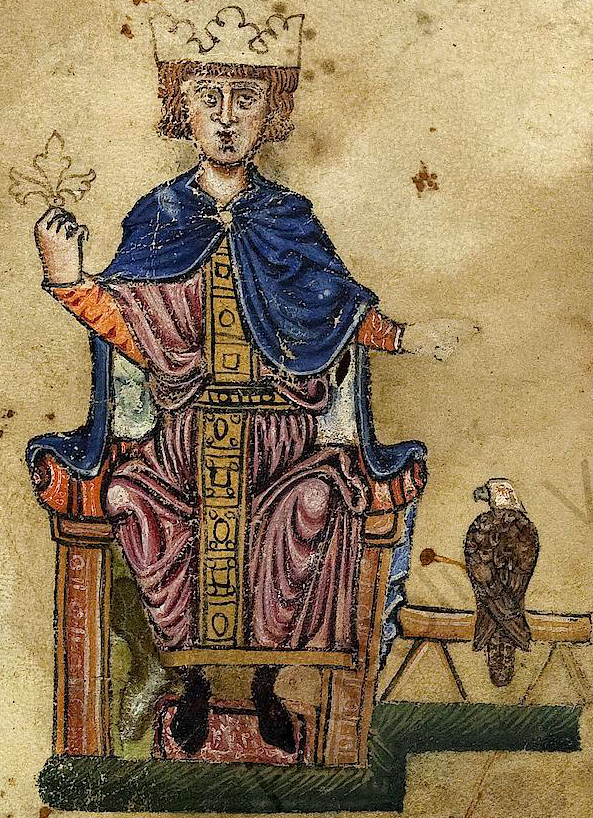
Frederick II sitting on his throne

On 12 July 1213, Frederick II, Holy Roman Emperor made a Golden Bull by which Frederick offered his obedience to the Pope and pledged himself to the principle of free canonical elections by the chapters, unhampered liberty of appeal to Rome on ecclesiastical issues, and abandonment of the traditional rights of the Crown to the personal estate of deceased bishops (Spolienrecht) and the Revenues of vacant sees (Regalienrecht).

== Bibliography ==
- Leeper, Alexander W. (1941). History of Medieval Austria. London: Oxford University Press. ISBN 978-0404153472.
