= Smilja Marjanović-Dušanić =

Serbian historian and professor

Smilja Marjanović-Dušanić (Serbian Cyrillic: Смиља Марјановић-Душанић; born 29 March 1963) is a Serbian historian and professor at the University of Belgrade Faculty of Philosophy. She is specializing in medieval studies.

Marjanović-Dušanić was born in Belgrade, SR Serbia, SFR Yugoslavia. She received her Master's degree in 1986, and Master of Advanced Studies in 1991, from the University of Belgrade. Awarded with a Doctorate in 1996 with the work Vladarska ideologija Nemanjića: diplomatička studija, she started working as a Docent in the Department of History at the Belgrade Faculty of Philosophy the next year. She was re-elected Docent in 2003.

== Works ==
- Vladarske insignije i državna simbolika u Srbiji od XIII do XV veka (1994)
- The Rulers’ Insignia in the Structural Evolution of Medieval Serbia (1999)
- The Zion Symbolics of the Monastery of Chilandari (2000)
- The New Constantine in serbian medieval hagiography (2001)
- Rex imago Dei (2002)
- Privatni život u srpskim zemljama srednjeg veka (2004)
- Les prières de Saint Syméon et saint Sava dans le programme monarchique du roi Milutin (2004)
- Dynastie et sainteté à l’époque de la famille des Lazarević: exemples anciens et nouveaux modèles (2006)
- The making of a Saint in medieval Serbia: sovereign as martyr (2006)
- L’idéologie monarchique de la dynastie des Némanide (2006)
- "Patterns of Martyrial Sanctity in the Royal Ideology of Medieval Serbia. Continuity and Change" (PDF). 2006.
- Sveti kralj (2007)
- “L’altérité“ dans le témoignage des récits hagiographiques serbes: l’exemple des Vies de Théodose (2007)
- Popović, Marko; Marjanović-Dušanić, Smilja; Popović, Danica (2016). Daily Life in Medieval Serbia. Belgrade: Clio & Institute for Balkan Studies. ISBN 9788671025256.
- "L'écriture et la sainteté dans la Serbie médiévale. Étude d'hagiographie" (2017)

== Sources ==
- "Curriculum académique et scientifique: Smilja Marjanović-Dušanić" (PDF). Monde byzantin.
