= St. Stephen Chrysobull =

St. Stephen Chrysobull (Serbian: Светостефански хрисовуљ / Svetostefanski hrisovulj)
- Istanbul, Topkapi Palace Museum (Topkapy sarayi müzesi, Gayri islami kitapliği), ? 70
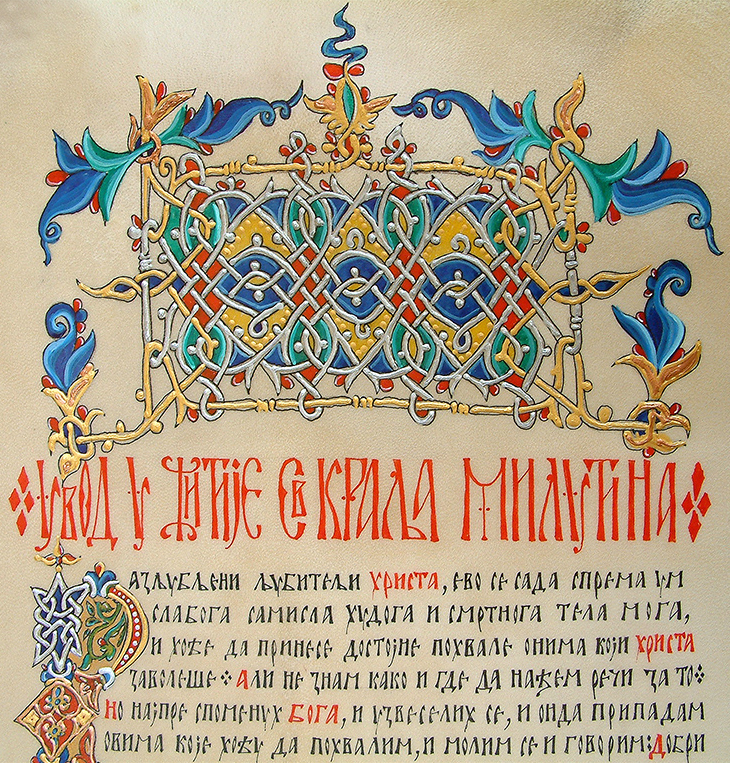
- Detail of the St. Stephen Chrysobull
- Also known as: Banjska Chrysobull (Бањска хрисовуља / Banjska hrisovulja)
- Type: Charter
- Date: c.1314–1316, 1317
- Place of origin: Kosovo, Banjska Monastery
- Scribe(s): Radoslav (Georgije), except ff. 27–28
- Material: Parchment; ink, tempera, gold; bound in red leather
- Size: 96 ff.; 210 × 270 mm (originally 230 × 290 mm: trimmed late 19th-cent.)
- Format: Codex
- Script: Uncial script, 12 lines per page, in brown ink; initials in cinnabar; signatures: Milutin and Dragutin in cinnabar, Nikodim in blue ink
- Contents: Chrysobull of Banjska Monastery, issued by Stefan Milutin (1253–1321)
- Additions: Stefan Crnojević's notes at end (late 15th cent.)
- Previously kept: Kosovo, Banjska Monastery; pillaged by Ottomans after Battle of Kosovo (1389)
- Discovered: 1899 by Jozef Korzienowski and/or Ármin Vámbéry (1832–1913); published 1890 by Ljubomir Kovačević (1848–1918)
- Other: Korzienowski's tracing paper copy: Archives of the Serbian Academy of Sciences & Arts, Old Collection, no. 495.

The St. Stephen Chrysobull (Serbian: Светостефански хрисовуљ/Svetostefanski hrisovulj) or Banjska Chrysobull (Бањска хрисовуља/Banjska hrisovulja) was a chrysobull, charter, issued in 1314–1316 by Serbian king Stefan Milutin (r. 1282–1321). It was held at the Banjska monastery founded by Milutin. It is currently held at the Topkapi library in Istanbul.

The Chrysobull describes in detail the expansion of estates which King Milutin gifted to the settlements of Ibar, Sitnica, Laba, in Ras, Hvosna, Plava, Budim, Zeta, and others. It also includes a special section by the name of "Law of Vlachs" which covers the regulations of Vlach cattle breeder obligations on that manor. After the Battle of Kosovo in 1389, the Ottomans pillaged Milutin’s endowment and took the charter in the process, which has been kept in Constantinople since the second half of the 15th century, in the sultan's treasury of Old Saraj.

== The appearance of the charter ==
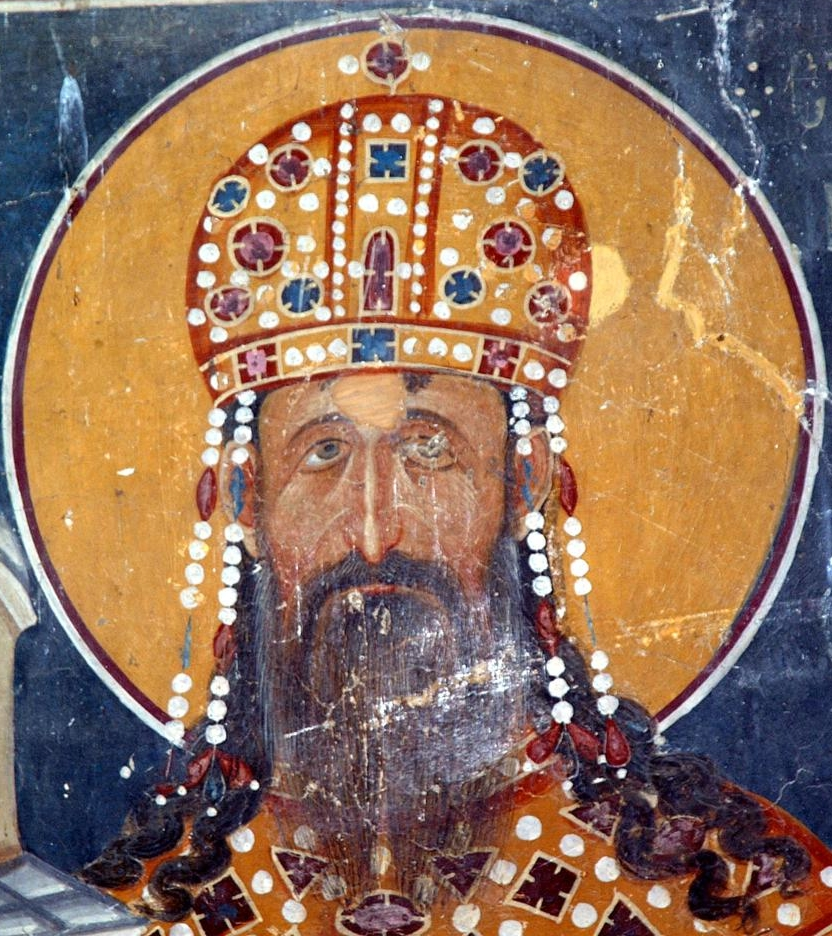
Serbian king Stefan Milutin issued the St. Stephen Chrysobull in 1314–16.

St. Stefan’s Chrysobull had been preserved in its original form—a parchment codex measuring 230 × 290 mm—but was trimmed down to 210 × 270 mm during the late 19th century, when it was rebound in the red leather currently enclosing it. The inner boards of the original binding included three spaces for seals; in the past the seals of Milutin and Dragutin were attached to it. The charter contains 180 pages with 2131 rows. Copied in Uncial script, in brown ink, with twelve lines per page, the manuscript boasts initials in red cinnabar, as well as signatures in red cinnabar (Milutin and Dragutin) and in blue ink (archbishop Nikodim). It is skilfully illuminated in colours and gold. According to A. Turilov, the entire main text, with the exception of ff. 27 and 28, was copied by Radoslav (Georgije), the scribe who also copied Milutin's 1315–1316 Hilandar Gospel Book; one of the codex's last pages features added 15th-century notes by Stefan Crnojević. The saved Chrysobull represents one of the manuscripts created upon acknowledgement in 1317. Stefan Crnojević clarified in a note that he bolded/thickened the faded signature of Archbishop Nikodim.

The St. Stephen’s Chrysobull is significant because it regulates obligations of the dependent population on monastic property. This part of the disposition is known by the name of "the law to the people of the church" or "Vlach law". The sanctions include a penalty for violators of the royal commandments and charter.

The exact date of the issuing of the charter is not known because, unusually, it does not include a dating clause. This is the only charter containing the confirmations of two Serbian Kings. Milutin's signature in the Chrysobull reads: "Stefan, by the mercy of God, King and Autocrat of all Serbian and seaside lands".

== Annotations ==
1. It was issued between 1314 and 1316. Older obsolete suggestions included 1293–1302 (F. Miklosich); 1299–1300; 1302–1309 (S. Novaković); before 1313; 1309–1316 (D. Janković); 1318 (V. Jagić).

== Sources ==
- Document: Transliterated full
- Ćurčić, Slobodan (1979). Gračanica: King Milutin's Church and Its Place in Late Byzantine Architecture. Pennsylvania State University Press. ISBN 9780271002187.
- Srđan Šarkić (1996). Srednjovekovno srpsko pravo. Matica srpska. ISBN 9788636303696.
- Filološki fakultet (1922). Prilozi za književnost, jezik, istoriju i folklor. Vol. 1–3. Državna štamparija. p. 97.
- Mirković, Zoran S., ed. (2019). Serbian law history. University of Belgrade, Faculty of Law.
