= Charter of Hilandar =

Charter of Hilandar Хиландарска повеља
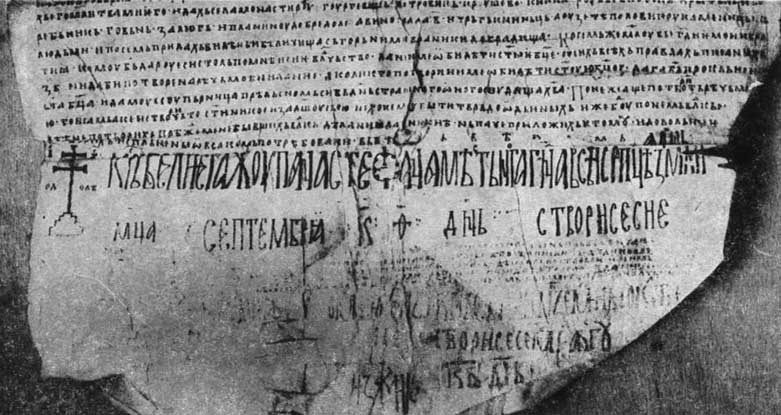
- Hilandar monastery
- Created: 1198–99
- Location: Hilandar; Serbia
- Signatories: Stefan Nemanja; Stefan Nemanjić
- Purpose: charter

Charter of Hilandar (Serbian: Хиландарска повеља) is the founding charter of the Hilandar monastery, the cradle of the Serbian Orthodox Church and main endowment of Stefan Nemanja and Saint Sava. It was written in 1198, while the second revision, of Stefan the First-Crowned in 1200–01.

Until 1896, the oldest Serbian charter in the Hilandar archives was the founding charter of Hilandar, while the oldest manuscript book in the Hilandar library was Miroslav's Gospel.

Both charters are written in Serbian recension of Church Slavonic (literary) language, but the vernacular is present in the parts where the gifts to Hilandar are discussed. The original version of Stefan II's revision is located in the Hilandar.

== See also ==
- Hilandar Typikon
- Karyes Typikon
- Serbian manuscripts

== Sources ==
- Solovjev, Aleksandar Vasiljević (1926). Hilandarska povelja velikog župana Stefana (Prvovenčanog) iz godine 1200-1202. Drž. štamp. Kraljevine Srba, Hrvata i Slovenaca.
- Henrik Birnbaum; Speros Vryonis (1972). Aspects of the Balkans: continuity and change. Contributions to the International Balkan Conference held at UCLA, October 23-28, 1969. Mouton. pp. 263–268. ISBN 9789027921727.
