= Battle of Anusan (795) =

Battle of the Arab-Byzantine wars

- Part of the Arab–Byzantine wars
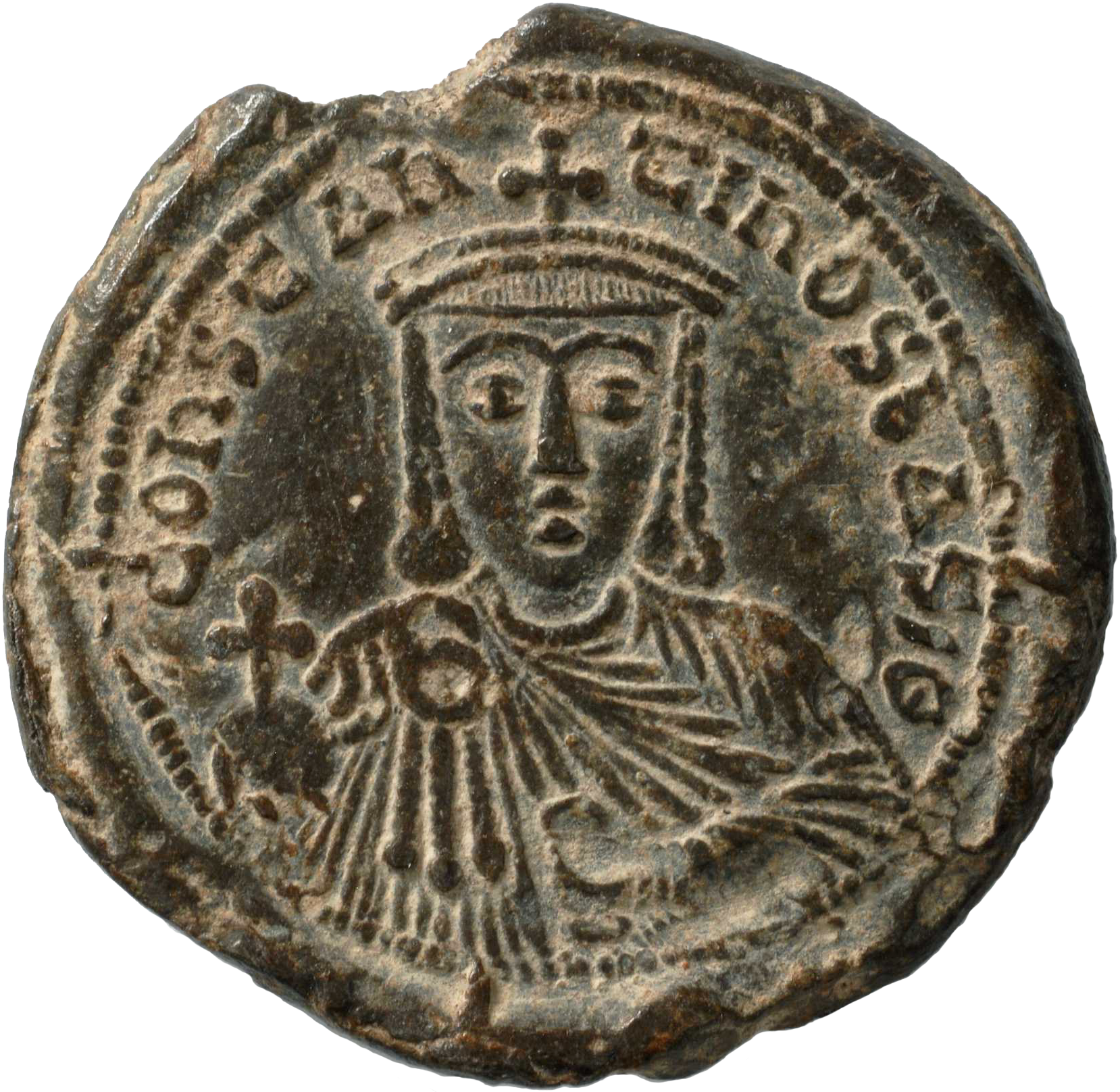
- Seal of Emperor Constantine VI
Date	8 May 795 AD
Location	Lamis river, Asia Minor (modern Turkey)
Result	Byzantine victory

Belligerents
Byzantine Empire	Abbasid Caliphate

Commanders and leaders
Constantine VI	Unknown

Strength
Unknown; possibly 20,000 (Note: The size of the Byzantine army assembled by Constantine VI to confront the Abbasids in 795 is not recorded. However, Theophanes notes that the Emperor commanded a force of 20,000 men in his expedition against the Arabs in 797)	Unknown; possibly fewer

The Battle of Anusan or Battle of Anousa occurred on the 8th of May 795 in Anatolia, and was fought between forces of the Byzantine Empire under the command of Emperor Constantine VI, and an invading Abbasid army. The result was a celebrated Byzantine victory, though it did not decisively improve the empire's strategic position in its conflict with the caliphate.

== Background ==
The strategic balance between the Byzantine Empire and the Abbasid Caliphate had been moving in favour of the Abbasids since the ascension of the regent Irene of Athens, for her son Constantine VI. The military situation was difficult for the empire, as the Abbasids launched a major invasion into Anatolia in 782, while the Bulgarians had won a victory at the Battle of Marcellae in 792. Additionally, a revolt by the men of the Armeniakon Theme further degraded the defences of the Byzantine frontier. Although Constantine defeated the revolt, the Arabs exploited the situation to invade and plunder Anatolia, capturing Kamacha and then sacking Thebasa. The situation further escalated when the former governor of Sicily and rebel Elpidius reached Abbasid territory. The Abbasids duly prepared an army 40,000 strong to conduct another expedition. The Byzantines gained respite when this expedition was halted and forced back at the fort of Sasima, when the Abbasids were struck by heavy snows. Their army sustained heavy losses from frostbite, and possible raids by thematic forces, and was ultimately forced to retreat in January 795. However, Arab raids into Anatolia resumed later in the year and prompted an imperial response.

== Battle of Anusan ==
By April 795, Constantine had mustered his troops and prepared to march against the Abbasids, who had conducted an invasion into the territory of the Anatolikon Theme. The size of his army is not known with certainty, but may have been similar in strength to the 20,000-strong force he led against the Arabs in 797. On 8 May, he encountered an Abbasid raiding column at a place named Anousan or Anousa in southern Anatolia, though the identification of this locale is not known with certainty. The historian Warren Treadgold considers it probable that the battle occurred near the Byzantine frontier with the caliphate, identifying the river mentioned in the sources as the Lamis.

In the ensuing battle, Constantine's army secured victory. After the Abbasid army was routed, Constantine's men conducted a long pursuit of their enemy. The Byzantines may have engaged the Arabs in such a location where a river (probably the Lamis) obstructed their route of retreat, as Theophanes the Confessor describes the Abbasids being driven against the river following their defeat. As the battle was his first major victory over a foreign enemy and had been won on the date of commemoration of John the Apostle, Constantine gave thanks the Saint for his success on the battlefield.

== Aftermath ==
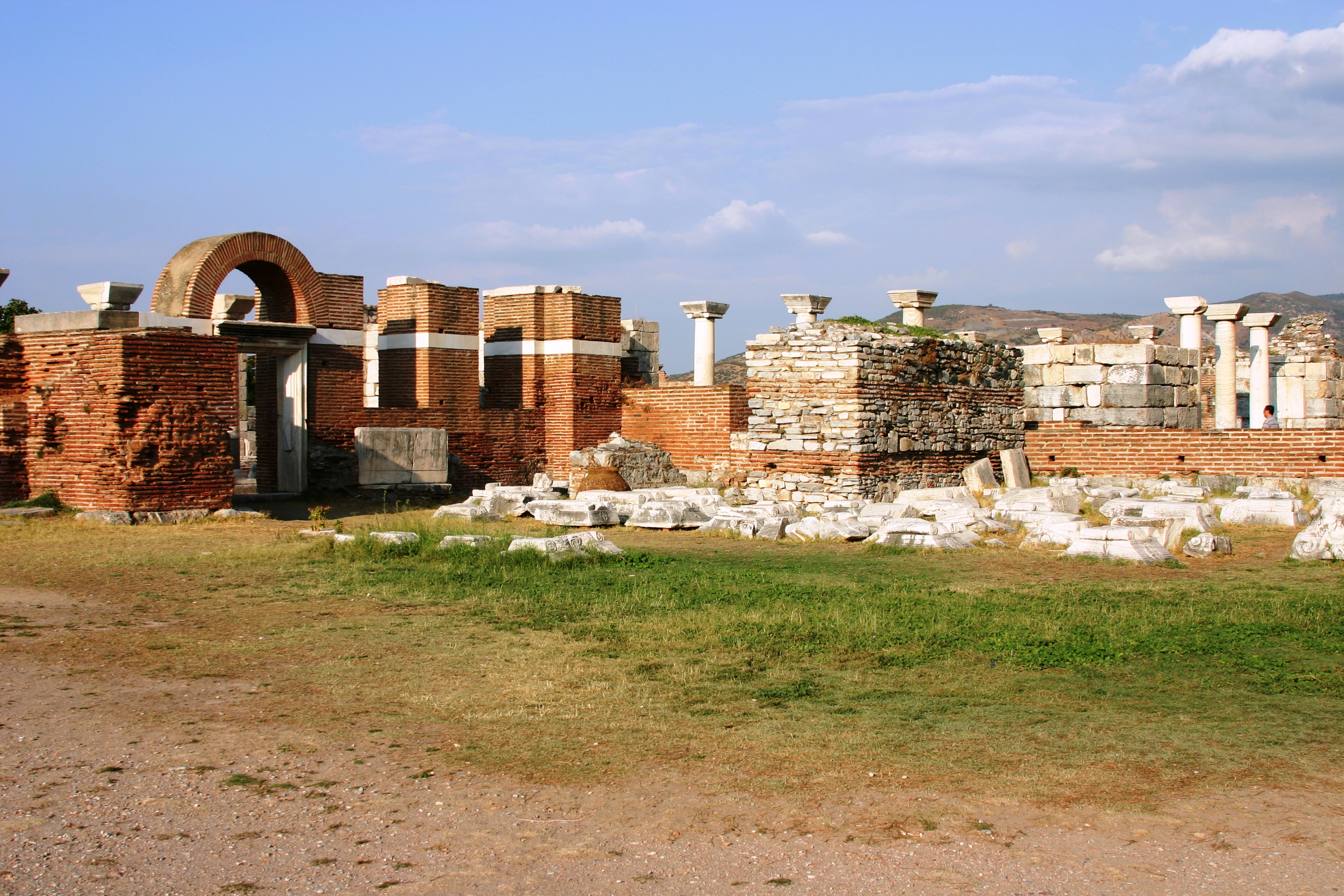
Ruins of the Basilica of Saint John the Theologian in Ephesus

Following his success, Constantine began his triumphant return to Constantinople. On the way, he stopped at Ephesus, where he visited the Basilica of Saint John. He donated 7,200 nomismata to the church and its clergy, as he deemed the blessing of the Saint to have been instrumental in his victory at Anusan. Constantine also became emboldened to marry his mistress, Theodote, crowning her Augusta beforehand. However, this led to conflict when the relatives of Theodote, her cousin Theodore and his uncle Plato of Sakkoudion, initiated protests against the marriage, implicitly calling for the excommunication of the emperor and his wife.

As a result of the battle of Anusan and campaigns against the Bulgars soon after, Constantine had made strategic progress against the empire's enemies by 797. However, this Byzantine resurgence proved fleeting. Political tensions exacerbated when in February of the same year, Constantine ordered the arrest of Theodore and Plato. One of the generals involved in the arrest, Bardanes, was allied with Constantine's mother Irene, who had plotted against her son, and managed to corrupt several officers of the tagmata to her side.

In early 797, the Caliph Harun personally conducted an offensive into Asia Minor. When news of this reached Constantine, he began mustering an army of 20,000 men in preparation for another expedition to confront the Abbasids, as he had in 795. However, the tagmatic officers in his army, who had allied with Irene, quickly caused the cancellation of the expedition by bribing scouts to report to the emperor that the Abbasids had fled. With no opposition, the caliph was able to capture and sack an unnamed fort in Cappadocia. The Arabs gained further success in August of that year, conducting a raid which pierced as far as the Boukellarion Theme. These achievements, along with the Byzantine dynastic strife following the success of Irene's plot to overthrow and blind Constantine in August 797, emboldened the Abbasids to launch an even more successful expedition in 798.

== Bibliography ==
- Treadgold, Warren (1988). The Byzantine Revival, 780–842.
- Treadgold, Warren (1997). A History of the Byzantine State and Society. Stanford, California: Stanford University Press. ISBN 978-0804779371.
- Kaldellis, Anthony (2023). The New Roman Empire: A History of Byzantium. Oxford University Press. ISBN 978-0197549322.
- Theophanes the Confessor (1997) [8th–9th centuries]. The Chronicle of Theophanes Confessor. Translated by Cyril Mango; Roger Scott. Oxford University Press. ISBN 0-19-822568-7.
- Sophoulis, Panos (2011). Byzantium and Bulgaria, 775–831. Winner of the 2013 John Bell Book Prize. Oxford University Press. ISBN 978 90 04 20695 3.
