= Battle of Krasos =

Battle in the Arab–Byzantine Wars

- Part of the Arab–Byzantine wars
- Anatolia and the Byzantine-Arab frontier c. 780 AD
Date	August/September 804 AD
Location	Krasos, Phrygia, modern Turkey
Result	Abbasid victory

Belligerents
Abbasid Caliphate	Byzantine Empire

Commanders and leaders
Harun al-Rashid; Ibrahim ibn Jibril	Nikephoros I (WIA)

Casualties and losses
Unknown	40,700 killed

The Battle of Krasos took place during the Arab–Byzantine Wars in August 804, between the Byzantines under Emperor Nikephoros I (r. 802–811) and an Abbasid army under Ibrahim ibn Jibril. Nikephoros' accession in 802 resulted in a resumption of warfare between Byzantium and the Abbasid Caliphate. In late summer 804, the Abbasids had invaded Byzantine Asia Minor for one of their customary raids, and Nikephoros set out to meet them. He was surprised, however, at Krasos and heavily defeated, barely escaping with his own life. A truce and prisoner exchange were afterwards arranged. Despite his defeat, and a massive Abbasid invasion the next year, Nikephoros persevered until troubles in the eastern provinces of the Caliphate forced the Abbasids to conclude a peace.

== Background ==
The deposition of Empress Irene of Athens (r. 797–802) in October 802, and subsequent accession of Nikephoros I, signalled a more violent phase in the long history of the Arab–Byzantine Wars. Following a series of destructive annual raids across Asia Minor by the Caliphate, Irene seems to have secured a truce with Harun al-Rashid in 798 in exchange for the annual payment of tribute, repeating the terms agreed for a three-year truce following Harun's first large-scale campaign in 782. Nikephoros, on the other hand, was more warlike and determined to refill the imperial treasury by, among other measures, ceasing the tribute. Harun retaliated at once, launching a raid under his son al-Qasim. Nikephoros could not respond to this, as he faced an ultimately unsuccessful revolt of the Asian army under its commander-in-chief, Bardanes Tourkos. After disposing of Bardanes, Nikephoros assembled his army and marched out himself to meet a second, larger invasion under the Caliph himself. After Harun raided the frontier region, the two armies confronted each other for two months in central Asia Minor, but it did not come to a battle; Nikephoros and Harun exchanged letters, until the Emperor arranged for a withdrawal and a truce for the remainder of the year in exchange for a one-off payment of tribute.

== Battle ==
After breaking the peace treaty with the Abbasids, Nikepohros I wrote to Harun al-Rashid:

From Nikepohros, King of the Romans, to Harun, King of the Arabs. As for what follows: The queen who preceded me (he spoke of Irene) placed you in the position of the rook and placed herself in the position of the pawn. She carried to you from her wealth what you were truly deserving of carrying the equivalent to her. But that was due to the weakness and foolishness of women. So when you read my letter, return what you have received from her wealth, and ransom yourself with whatever constitutes a penalty upon you; otherwise, the sword shall be between us.

When Harun al-Rashid read the letter, anger provoked him, and he wrote on the back of the letter:

In the name of God, the most Gracious, the most Merciful. From Harun, commander of the Faithful, to Nikepohros, the dog of the Romans. I have read your letter, O son of an unbelieving woman. The answer is what you will see, not what you will hear.

In August 804, Harun dispatched another raid under his general Ibrahim ibn Jibril. The Arabs crossed into Asia Minor through the Cilician Gates and raided freely. Nikephoros set out to meet them, but was forced to return before he could do so due to some unspecified event at his back (Warren Treadgold surmises news of a possible conspiracy). On his march home, however, the Arabs launched a surprise attack at Krasos in Phrygia and defeated his army. The exact location of Krasos is unknown, but it was said to be a small plain along a road. According to al-Tabari, the Byzantines lost 40,700 men and 4,000 pack animals, while the Emperor himself was wounded three times. The Byzantine chronicler Theophanes the Confessor confirms that the imperial army lost many men and that Nikephoros was almost killed himself; saved only by the bravery of his officers.

== Aftermath ==
Preoccupied with trouble in Khurasan, Harun now accepted tribute and made peace. An exchange of prisoners was also arranged and took place during the winter at the two empires' border, on the Lamos River in Cilicia; some 3,700 Muslims were exchanged for the Byzantines taken captive in the previous years. During Harun's absence in Khurasan, however, Nikephoros used the opportunity to rebuild the destroyed walls of the towns of Safsaf, Thebasa, and Ancyra. The following summer he launched the first Byzantine raid for two decades; into the Arab frontier district (thughur) in Cilicia. The Byzantine army raided and took prisoners as it went, even capturing the major Abbasid stronghold of Tarsus. At the same time, another Byzantine force raided the Upper Mesopotamian thughur and unsuccessfully besieged the fortress of Melitene, while a Byzantine-instigated rebellion against the local Arab garrison began in Cyprus. Harun retaliated with a massive invasion in 806, which forced Nikephoros to come to terms, Nikepohros yielded to Harun's demands, agreeing to pay 300,000 dinars and repair the fortresses that had been destroyed. but the Byzantine ruler soon violated them and prevailed over the Abbasid expeditions sent against him in 807. Following renewed trouble in Khurasan, a peace treaty was signed in 808 which left the Byzantine frontier zone intact and ended the payment of tribute to the Caliphate.

== Sources ==
- Bosworth, C. E., ed. (1989). The History of al-Ṭabarī, Volume XXX: The ʿAbbāsid Caliphate in Equilibrium: The Caliphates of Mūsā al-Hādī and Hārūn al-Rashīd, A.D. 785–809/A.H. 169–192. SUNY Series in Near Eastern Studies. Albany, New York: State University of New York Press. ISBN 978-0-88706-564-4.
- Brooks, E. W. (1923). "Chapter V. (A) The Struggle with the Saracens (717–867)". The Cambridge Medieval History, Vol. IV: The Eastern Roman Empire (717–1453). Cambridge: Cambridge University Press. pp. 119–138.
- Mango, Cyril; Scott, Roger (1997). The Chronicle of Theophanes Confessor. Byzantine and Near Eastern History, AD 284–813. Oxford: Oxford University Press. ISBN 0-19-822568-7.
- Treadgold, Warren (1988). The Byzantine Revival, 780–842. Stanford, California: Stanford University Press. ISBN 978-0-8047-1462-4.
- Omar, Farouk (2009). الخلافة العباسية: عصر القوة والازدهار [The Abbasid Caliphate: The Era of Power and Prosperity] (in Arabic). Vol. 1. Dar Shorouq. ISBN 9789957000073.
