= Capture of Thebasa =

793 siege

Capture of Thebasa (793)
- Part of the Arab–Byzantine wars
- Map of Byzantine Asia Minor and the Byzantine-Arab frontier region c. 780
Date	793
Location	Thebasa, Asia Minor
Result	Abbasid victory

Belligerents
Byzantine Empire	Abbasid Caliphate

Commanders and leaders
Unknown	Abdul-Rahman bin Abd al-Malik

Casualties and losses
400 killed Unknown number of captives	Unknown

The Capture of Thebasa was a military engagement between the Abbasids and the Byzantines in the fort of Thebasa. An Arab raiding force captured and sacked Thebasa, reducing the fortress into ruins.

== Background ==
In October 791, the Byzantine emperor Constantine VI allowed his mother Irene of Athens to return to imperial affairs and restored the title of empress to her. However, the Armeniac theme opposed Irene's return. The strategos of the Armeniac, Alexios Mosele, was summoned to Constantinople, where he was flogged, blinded, and imprisoned for his rebellion. This outraged the theme's troops and blinded Alexios's successor, Theodore Camilianus. Constantine dispatched an army to subdue the rebels but was defeated. Constantine then marched by himself and easily defeated them. Constantine won by promising Armenian troops large rewards if they abandoned their Armeniac allies. However, he never did.

The Armeniac rebellion weakened the empire's defenses. Soon after the rebellion was crushed, the Abbasid Arabs, based at their reconstructed fort of Hadath, took advantage of the internal conflicts and launched a raid in 793. The Abbasids arrived at the fort of Camachus. Camachus was under the Armenian troops who joined Constantine, but they were disappointed that he did not reward them. Subsequently, they handed the fort to the Arabs. The fort remained under Arabs for 20 years.

== Capture ==
After their success, the Abbasids staged another major raid in the same summer of the same year. The Arab forces were under Abdul-Rahman bin Abd al-Malik. The Arab raiding force was sent to the Anatolic theme. They crossed the Tarsus passes and laid siege to the fortress of Thebasa on the road to Amorium. The Byzantine garrison resisted bravely, but the Arabs cut off their water supplies, which caused a great thirst in the fort that killed 400 of the Byzantine garrison. This forced them to surrender, and they were allowed to go under. The Arabs took civilian prisoners and a considerable amount of booty, including gold and other valuable goods. They proceeded to destroy the fort, which remained in ruins for 12 years.

== Aftermath ==
The capture of Camachus and Thebasa, two important forts on the borders, was significant. This paved the way for the Arab raiders to penetrate further into Asia Minor. In 794, the Arabs launched a major invasion with a large army to put Elpidius on the Byzantine throne, but the expedition ended in failure due to heavy snows. In the same year, an Arab raiding party appeared before Ürgüp, and in 796, they reached as far as Amorium.

== Sources ==
- Warren Treadgold (1988), The Byzantine revival, 780–842.
- Stephen Mitchell (1981), Armies and Frontiers in Roman and Byzantine Anatolia.
- Panos Sophoulis (2011), Byzantium and Bulgaria, 775–831. Winner of the 2013 John Bell Book Prize.
