= Michael of Synnada =

8th-century Byzantine bishop

Saint Michael of Synnada
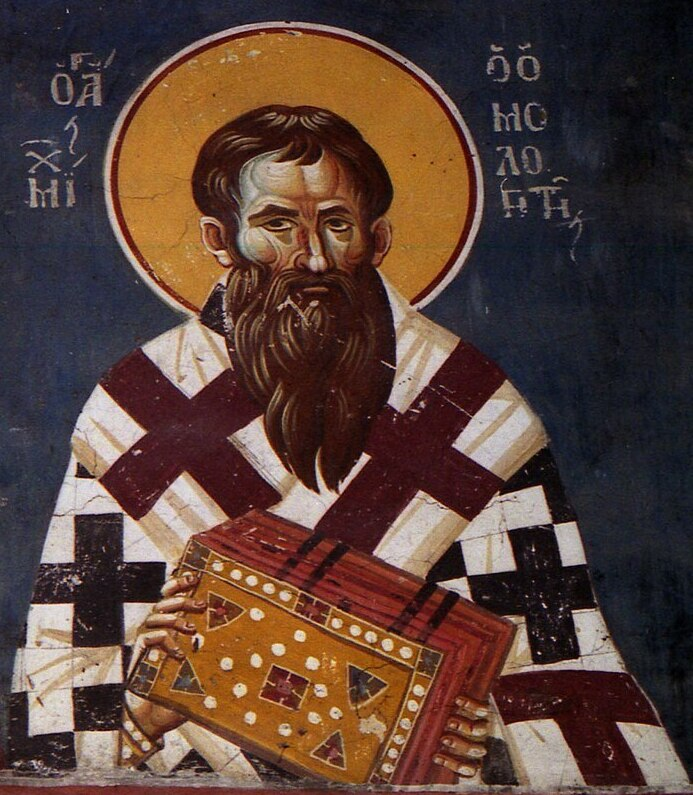
- Fresco from the Church of St. Mary Peribleptos, Ohrid

Bishop and Confessor
- Born: 8th century Synnada in Phrygia (modern-day Şuhut, Afyonkarahisar Province, Turkey)
- Died: 23 May 826; Constantinople (modern-day Istanbul, Turkey)
- Venerated in: Eastern Orthodox Church; Catholic Church
- Feast: 23 May
- Attributes: Episcopal vestments; sometimes depicted with a Gospel book
- Controversy: Opponent of Byzantine Iconoclasm

Michael of Synnada or Michael the Confessor (Greek: Μιχαὴλ ὁ ὁμολογητής; died 23 May 826) was a metropolitan bishop of Synnada from 784/7 to 815. He represented Byzantium in diplomatic missions to Harun al-Rashid and Charlemagne. He was exiled by Emperor Leo V the Armenian because of his opposition to iconoclasm, and died on 23 May 826. He is honoured as a saint by the Eastern Orthodox and Roman Catholic churches, his feast day is May 23.

== Life ==
Nothing is known about Michael's early life. He was much influenced by Tarasios (Patriarch of Constantinople in 784–806), who tonsured him. Tarasios sent Michael, along with Theophylact of Nicomedia, to him to a monastery that Tarasios himself had founded on the shores of the Bosporus. By 787, when he attended the Second Council of Nicaea, Michael was already metropolitan bishop of Synnada, having been named to the position by Tarasios. Michael is recorded in all sessions of the council.

He is commonly identified with the Michahel episcopus who was one of the leaders (along with Petrus abbas, identified with Peter of Goulaion) of an embassy sent by Emperor Nikephoros I to Charlemagne in 802/3, to ratify the peace treaty between the two. Nikephoros used Michael and Peter, along with Gregory, the steward of Amastris, again as peace envoys in 806, when the Abbasid caliph Harun al-Rashid launched a large-scale invasion of Asia Minor.

In 811/2 he led another embassy to Charlemagne, along with the protospatharioi Arsaphios and Theognostos, on behalf of Michael I Rangabe, in order to renew the peace treaty and negotiate a possible marriage of Michael's son Theophylact and one of Charlemagne's daughters. Despite a warm reception at Aachen and the ratification of a peace treaty between the two realms, Charlemagne, perhaps wary after the repeated failures of successive efforts to that effect over the previous decades, hesitated to agree to such a match. On their way to Charlemagne's court, the embassy passed through Rome, where Michael handed over the synodika (enthronement letter) of Tarasios' successor, Patriarch Nikephoros I, to Pope Leo III.

He clashed with the Emperor Leo V the Armenian over Leo's re-adoption of iconoclasm in 815. He was arrested and exiled to Eudokias. He died there on 23 May 826.

== Veneration ==
He is praised in the Synodikon of Orthodoxy of 843, and is venerated as a saint by the Orthodox and Catholic Churches on 23 May. He is invoked for protection of crops from pests.

== Sources ==
- Lilie, Ralph-Johannes; Ludwig, Claudia; Pratsch, Thomas; Zielke, Beate (2013). Prosopographie der mittelbyzantinischen Zeit Online. Berlin-Brandenburgische Akademie der Wissenschaften. Nach Vorarbeiten F. Winkelmanns erstellt (in German). Berlin and Boston: De Gruyter.
- Treadgold, Warren (1988). The Byzantine Revival, 780–842. Stanford, California: Stanford University Press. ISBN 978-0-8047-1462-4.
