= Abbasid invasion of Asia Minor (806) =

Campaign of the Arab-Byzantine Wars

- Part of the Arab–Byzantine wars
- Map of Byzantine Asia Minor and the frontier region with the Abbasid Caliphate c. 780
Date	Summer 806
Location	Eastern and central Asia Minor
Result	Abbasid victory

Belligerents
Abbasid Caliphate	Byzantine Empire

Commanders and leaders
Harun al-Rashid	Nikephoros I

The 806 invasion of Asia Minor was the largest of a long series of military operations launched by the Abbasid Caliphate against the Byzantine Empire. The expedition took place in southeastern and central Asia Minor, where the two states shared a long land border.

Upon coming to the throne, the Byzantine emperor Nikephoros I (r. 802–811) ceased paying the tribute agreed to by his predecessors with the Caliphate, and launched attacks on the Abbasid frontier regions. The Abbasid caliph, Harun al-Rashid (r. 786–809), who sought to promote himself as a champion of jihad, decided to lead in person a retaliatory attack with the objective of punishing the Byzantines and impressing Abbasid influence upon their emperor.

Harun assembled his army at Raqqa in northern Syria. Medieval historians record numbers to be as high as 135,000 or even 300,000 men. While these are clearly exaggerated according to some modern scholars, it is clear that the Abbasid force assembled for the invasion was far larger than anything seen before. The Abbasid army set out from Raqqa on 11 June 806, crossed the coastal region of Cilicia and the Taurus Mountains, and invaded the Byzantine province of Cappadocia. The Abbasids met no opposition and raided at will, capturing several towns and fortresses. Celebrated in Arab histories was the siege, fall, and sack of the city of Herakleia; its name was later given to a victory monument erected by the Caliph near Raqqa. The Byzantine losses forced Nikephoros to seek peace terms in which he offered a resumption of tribute payments in exchange for the Abbasids' withdrawal. However, this time Harun exacted an additional personal tax levied on the Emperor and his son and heir, Staurakios, as a token of their submission to the Caliph.

Almost immediately following Harun's departure, Nikephoros violated the peace terms by refortifying the sacked frontier forts and stopping tribute payments. However, Harun's preoccupation with a rebellion in Khurasan, and his death three years later, prevented a reprisal on a similar scale to 806. Smaller-scale raids continued on both sides, but the Abbasid civil war, which began after 809, and the Byzantine preoccupation with the Bulgars contributed to a cessation of large-scale Arab–Byzantine conflict for the next two decades.

== Background ==
The deposition of Byzantine empress Irene of Athens in October 802 and the accession of Nikephoros I in her place marked the start of a more violent phase in the long history of the Arab–Byzantine wars. Following a series of destructive annual raids into Byzantine Asia Minor by the Abbasid Caliphate, Irene apparently secured a truce with Caliph Harun al-Rashid in 798 in exchange for the annual payment of tribute, repeating the terms agreed for a three-year truce after Harun's first large-scale campaign into Asia Minor in 782. Nikephoros, on the other hand, was more warlike—a Syriac source records that when he learned of Nikephoros's accession, a Byzantine renegade warned the Abbasid governor of Upper Mesopotamia to "throw away his silk and put on his armour". In addition, the new emperor was determined to refill the treasury by, among other measures, ceasing the tribute.

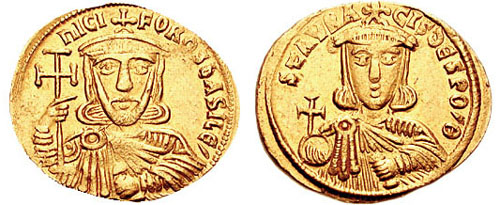
Gold nomisma of Emperor Nikephoros I (left) and his son and heir, Staurakios (right)

In retaliation for the cessation of tribute and the violation of the peace agreement concluded with Irene, Harun launched a raid under his son al-Qasim in spring 803. Nikephoros could not respond to this, as he faced a large-scale revolt of the Byzantine army of Asia Minor under its commander-in-chief, Bardanes Tourkos. After disposing of Bardanes, Nikephoros assembled his army and marched out to meet a second, larger invasion under the Caliph in person. After Harun raided the frontier region, the two armies faced one another for two months in central Asia Minor, but it did not come to a battle: Nikephoros and Harun exchanged letters, (Note: Al-Tabari and other Muslim sources record the texts, supposedly of Nikephoros' letter demanding the return of the tribute paid until then, and Harun's brief reply to Nikephoros, calling him "the dog of the Byzantines" (kalb al-Rum): "O son of an infidel woman, I have read your letter, and the reply is what you will see, without you having to hear it. Farewell!". The Byzantine sources report nothing of such an exchange in 802 or 803. Only the Byzantine writer George Hamartolos, reporting on the events of 804/5, insists that Nikephoros wrote to Harun in conciliatory terms, reminding him of Muhammad's injunction to treat Christians well, and suggested a truce, which the Caliph accepted, reciprocating the gifts that Nikephoros had sent to him. The Orientalist Marius Canard generally dismisses the reported content of the letters from either side as most likely unhistorical, but stresses that the existence of a correspondence between the two monarchs should be considered as a fact.) until the Emperor arranged for a withdrawal and a truce for the remainder of the year in exchange for a one-off payment of tribute.

In the next year, 804, an Abbasid force under Ibrahim ibn Jibril crossed the Taurus Mountains into Asia Minor. Nikephoros set out to confront the Arabs, but was surprised and heavily defeated at the Battle of Krasos, where he barely escaped with his life. Preoccupied with trouble in Khurasan, whose governor, Ali ibn Isa ibn Mahan, had aroused the opposition of the local inhabitants, Harun once more accepted tribute and made peace. An exchange of prisoners was also arranged and took place during the winter at the border of the two empires on the Lamos in Cilicia: some 3700 Muslims were exchanged for the Byzantines taken captive in the previous years.

Harun then departed for Rayy to deal with the trouble in Khurasan, leaving al-Qasim to watch over the Byzantine frontier. In the spring of 805, Nikephoros used the opportunity to rebuild the destroyed walls of the towns of Safsaf, Thebasa, and Ancyra. In the summer of the same year, he launched the first Byzantine raid in two decades against the Arab frontier districts (thughur) in Cilicia. The Byzantine army raided the territory surrounding the fortresses of Mopsuestia and Anazarbus and took prisoners as it went. The garrison of Mopsuestia attacked the Byzantine force and recovered most of the prisoners and spoils, but the Byzantines marched on to Tarsus, which had been refortified and repopulated on Harun's orders in 786 to strengthen the Muslim hold on Cilicia. The city fell and the entire garrison was taken captive.

At the same time, another Byzantine force raided the Upper Mesopotamian thughur and unsuccessfully besieged the fortress of Melitene, while a Byzantine-instigated rebellion against the local Arab garrison began in Cyprus, which for over a century had been an Arab–Byzantine condominium. (Note: In 688, Emperor Justinian II and the Umayyad caliph Abd al-Malik ibn Marwan concluded an agreement whereby Cyprus became a neutral territory, its tax revenue shared between Byzantium and the Caliphate, and its ports open to both powers, including for military purposes against one another. Apart from a brief Byzantine reoccupation under Basil I, this status lasted until 965, when the island was reincorporated into the Byzantine Empire.)

This sudden resumption of Byzantine offensive activity greatly alarmed Harun, especially as he received reports that Nikephoros was planning similar attacks for the next year, which this time would aim at the full reoccupation of these frontier territories. As the historian Warren Treadgold writes, if the Byzantines had been successful in this endeavour, "garrisoning Tarsus and Melitene would have partly blocked the main Arab invasion routes across the Taurus into the Byzantine heartland, to the Byzantines' great benefit". On the other hand, Nikephoros was certainly aware of the huge superiority of the Caliphate in men and resources, and it is more likely that he intended this campaign simply as a show of strength and a test of his enemy's resolve.

== Campaign ==
Having settled matters in Khurasan by confirming Ibn Mahan in his governorship, Harun returned to the west in November 805 and prepared a huge retaliatory expedition for 806, drawing men from Syria, Palestine, Persia, and Egypt. According to al-Tabari, his army numbered 135,000 regular troops and additional volunteers and freebooters. These numbers are easily the largest ever recorded for the entire Abbasid era, and about half as many as the estimated strength of the entire Byzantine army. Although they—and the even more fantastic claims of the Byzantine chronicler Theophanes the Confessor of 300,000 men—are certainly exaggerated, they are nevertheless indicative of the size of the Abbasid force. At the same time, a naval force under his admiral Humayd ibn Ma'yuf al-Hajuri was prepared to raid Cyprus.

Map of the Byzantine–Arab frontier zone in southeastern Asia Minor, where the Abbasid campaign of 806 took place

The huge invasion army departed Harun's residence of Raqqa in northern Syria on 11 June 806, with the Caliph at its head. Al-Tabari reports that Harun put on a cap with the inscription "Warrior for the Faith and Pilgrim" (in Arabic, "ghazi, hajj"). The Abbasids crossed Cilicia, where Harun ordered Tarsus to be rebuilt, and entered Byzantine Cappadocia through the Cilician Gates. Harun marched to Tyana, which at the time seems to have been abandoned. There, he began to establish his base of operations, ordering Uqbah ibn Ja'far al-Khuza'i to refortify the town and erect a mosque.

Harun's lieutenant Abdallah ibn Malik al-Khuza'i took Sideropalos. From there, Harun's cousin Dawud ibn Isa ibn Musa moved to pillage central Cappadocia, with half the Abbasid army—some 70,000 men according to al-Tabari. Another of Harun's generals, Sharahil ibn Ma'n ibn Za'ida, captured the so-called "Fortress of the Slavs" (Hisn al-Saqalibah) and the recently rebuilt town of Thebasa, while Yazid ibn Makhlad captured the "Fort of the Willow" (al-Safsaf) and Malakopea. Andrasos was captured and Kyzistra was placed under siege, while raiders reached as far as Ancyra, which they did not capture.

Harun himself, with the other half of his forces, went west and captured the strongly fortified city of Herakleia after a month-long siege in August or September. The city was plundered and razed, and its inhabitants enslaved and deported to slavery in the Abbasid Caliphate. The fall of Herakleia was considered by the Arab chroniclers the most significant achievement of Harun's expeditions against the Byzantines, and is the central event in the narratives of Harun's retaliatory campaign against Nikephoros. As the historian Marius Canard remarks, "for the Arabs the capture of Herakleia had an impact as profound as the Sack of Amorium in 838", which is completely at odds with the city's actual importance. Indeed, the Byzantine sources do not place any particular emphasis on the fall of Herakleia compared to the other fortresses captured during Harun's 806 campaign. (Note: There is at least some indication in the Arab sources that a different course was suggested to the Caliph: Harun is said to have asked two leaders from the frontier region on whether he should attack Herakleia. The first replied that it was the strongest fortress, and that if it fell, no-one would be able to oppose them, but the second replied that the city would yield little booty, and that he should attack a more important city. However, during the course of the siege he is said to have changed his mind and encouraged Harun to persist with the siege, when the Caliph was thinking of abandoning it.)

At the same time, on Cyprus, Humayd ravaged the island and took some 16,000 Cypriots, including the local archbishop, captive to Syria, where they were sold as slaves.

Nikephoros, outnumbered and threatened by the Bulgars in his rear, could not resist the Abbasid onslaught. He campaigned himself at the head of his army and seemingly won a few minor engagements against isolated detachments, but stayed well clear of the main Abbasid forces. In the end, with the harrowing possibility of the Arabs wintering on Byzantine soil in Tyana, he sent three clerics as ambassadors: Michael, the bishop of Synnada, Peter, the abbot of the monastery of Goulaion, and Gregory, the steward of the metropolis of Amastris. Harun agreed to peace in exchange for the payment of an annual tribute (30,000 gold nomismata, according to Theophanes, 50,000 according to al-Tabari), but the Emperor and his son and heir, Staurakios, were to pay a humiliating personal poll-tax (jizya) of three gold coins each to the Caliph (four and two respectively, in Tabari's version), thereby acknowledging themselves as the Caliph's subjects. In addition, Nikephoros promised not to rebuild the dismantled forts. Harun then recalled his forces from their various sieges and evacuated Byzantine territory.

== Aftermath ==
"Nikephoros has violated the truce that you granted him,
but the wheel of fortune will turn against him.
[...] Nikephoros, if you betray once the [Caliph] is away,
it is because of your own ignorance and blindness.
[...] [Nikephoros] has paid the jizya and fear of the sword has made him bow his head,
for death is what he dreads."

— Poem by a court poet (his name is uncertain) in praise of Harun's expedition against Nikephoros.

The agreement of peace terms was followed by a friendly exchange between the two rulers, related by al-Tabari: Nikephoros asked Harun for a young Byzantine woman, one of the candidate brides for his son Staurakios, who had been taken captive when Herakleia fell, and for some perfume. According to al-Tabari,

[Harun] ordered the slave girl to be sought out; she was brought back, adorned with finery and installed on a seat in the tent in which he himself was lodging. The slave girl and the tent, together with its contents, vessels and fittings, were handed over to Nikephoros's envoy. He also sent to Nikephoros the perfume which he had requested, and he further sent to him dates, dishes of jellied sweets, raisins and healing drugs.

Nikephoros returned the favour by dispatching a horse laden with 50,000 silver coins, 100 satin garments, 200 garments of fine brocade, 12 falcons, four hunting dogs, and three more horses. But as soon as the Arabs had withdrawn, the Emperor again restored the frontier forts and thereafter ceased the payment of tribute. Theophanes records that Harun unexpectedly returned and seized Thebasa in retaliation, but this is not corroborated elsewhere.

The Arabs did launch a series of retaliatory raids in the next year, but the spring raid under Yazid ibn Makhlad al-Hubayri al-Fazari was soundly defeated, with Yazid himself falling in the field. The larger summer raid under Harthama ibn A'yan was met by Nikephoros in person, and after an indecisive battle both sides retreated. The Byzantines raided the region of Marash in return, while in late summer Humayd launched a major naval raid, which pillaged Rhodes and reached as far as the Peloponnese, where it may have fomented a rebellion among the local Slavs. On his return, however, Humayd lost several ships to a storm, and on the Peloponnese, the Slavic revolt was put down after failing to capture the city of Patras. The failure of the year's Abbasid efforts were compounded by the outbreak of Rafi ibn al-Layth's rebellion in Khurasan, which forced Harun to depart again for the East. The Caliph concluded a new truce, and another prisoner exchange was held at the Lamos in 808. Nikephoros was thus left with his gains, both the restored frontier fortifications and the cessation of tribute, intact.

== Impact ==
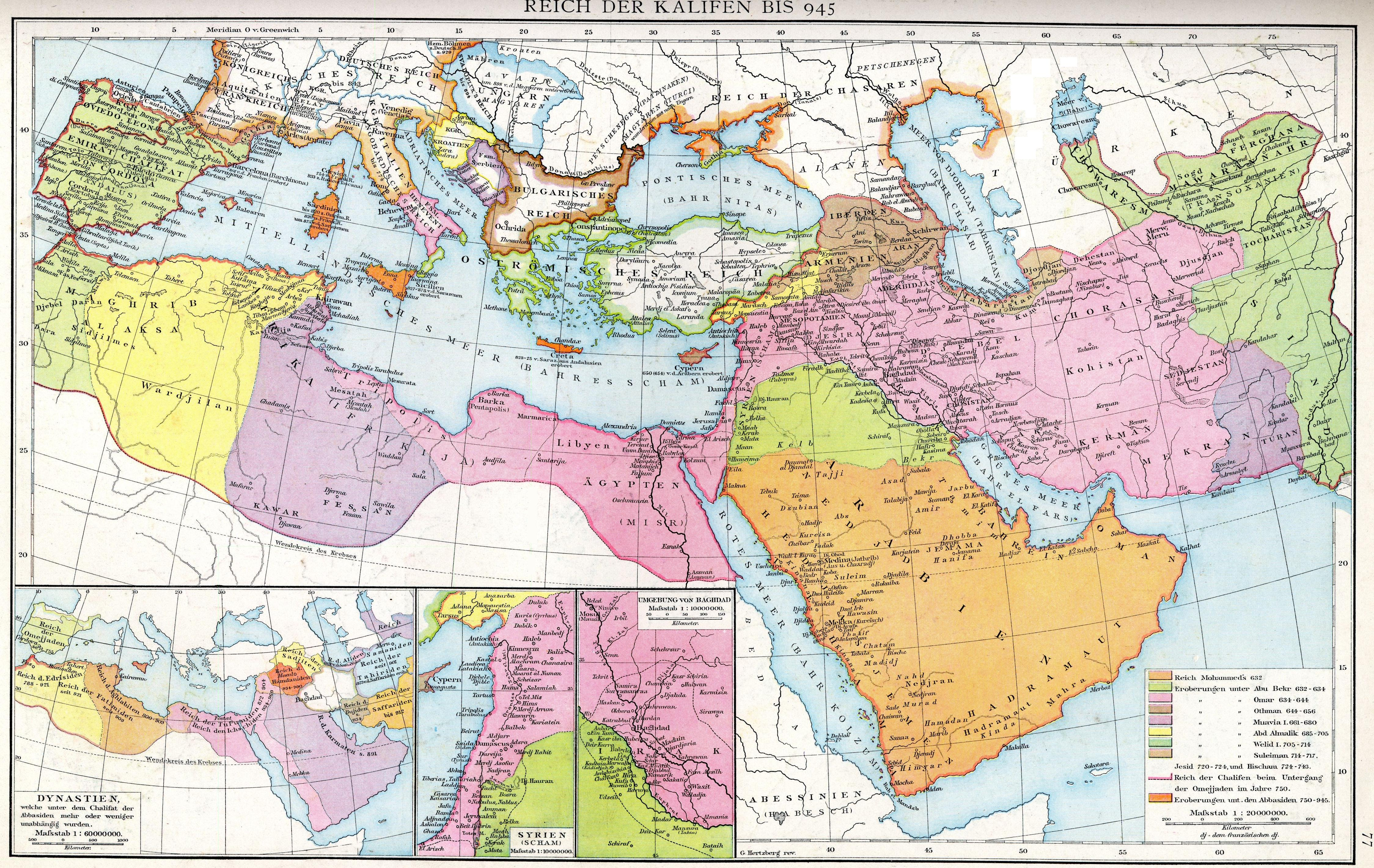
Map of the spread of Islam during the 7th and 8th centuries and of the Muslim world under the Umayyad and early Abbasid caliphates, from the Allgemeiner historischer Handatlas of Johann Gustav Droysen (1886)

Harun's massive expedition achieved remarkably little in material terms. Despite the sack of Herakleia, and its prominent treatment in Arab sources, no permanent result was achieved, as Nikephoros was quick to violate the terms of the truce. According to the historian Warren Treadgold, if Harun had taken the advice offered by one of his lieutenants to proceed further west and sack a major city, he might have inflicted more long-lasting damage on Byzantium, but the Caliph's objectives were more limited: Harun was content with a show of force that would intimidate Nikephoros and prevent him from repeating the offensive of 805, and which bolstered his credentials as a champion of Islam. (Note: In contrast with their Umayyad predecessors, the Abbasid caliphs pursued a conservative foreign policy. In general terms, they were content with the territorial limits achieved, and whatever external campaigns they waged were retaliatory or pre-emptive, meant to preserve their frontier and impress Abbasid might upon their neighbours. At the same time, the campaigns against Byzantium in particular were important for domestic consumption. The annual raids were a symbol of the continuing jihad of the early Muslim state and were the only external expeditions where the Caliph or his sons participated in person. They were closely paralleled in official propaganda by the leadership by Abbasid family members of the annual pilgrimage (hajj) to Mecca, highlighting the dynasty's leading role in the religious life of the Muslim community. Harun al-Rashid in particular actively strove to embody this duty: he was said to have alternated between leading the hajj one year and attacking Byzantium the next. The hitherto unseen extent of his personal involvement in the jihad converted it into a central tenet of his conception of the caliphate, leading modern historians to consider Harun as the creator of a new type of model ruler, the "ghazi-caliph".) In that regard, the Abbasid campaign was certainly a success: after 806, the Byzantine ruler abandoned whatever expansionist plans he may have had for the eastern border and focused his energy on his fiscal reforms, the recovery of the Balkans, and his wars there against the Bulgars, which would end with his death in the disastrous Battle of Pliska in 811.

On the other hand, the historian M. A. Shaban considers the campaign a "limited success" at best, and criticizes Harun's "single-minded" attention to the Byzantines as a "totally misguided effort". According to Shaban, not only did the Byzantines have no real ability (or intention) to seriously threaten the Caliphate, but Harun's recruitment drive led to the influx of eastern soldiers from Khurasan, which antagonized the traditional Syrian–Iraqi military elites and created rifts that contributed to the Fourth Fitna, the Abbasid civil war that broke out after Harun's death. This conflict, between Harun's sons al-Amin (r. 809–813) and al-Ma'mun (r. 813–833), meant that the Abbasid Caliphate was not able to exploit the Byzantine reversals in the Balkans. Indeed, the 806 campaign and the ineffectual raids of 807 mark the last major, centrally organized, Abbasid expeditions against Byzantium for over twenty years. Isolated raids and counter-raids continued at land as well as at sea, and, independently of the Abbasids, local Muslim leaders conquered Crete and launched the conquest of Sicily in the 820s. Nevertheless, large-scale operations over the land border in eastern Asia Minor between the two empires resumed only after the accession of Emperor Theophilos (r. 829–842), whose confrontations with the caliphs al-Ma'mun and al-Mu'tasim (r. 833–842) culminated in the great invasions by al-Ma'mun in 830–833, and the sack of Amorium by al-Mu'tasim in 838.

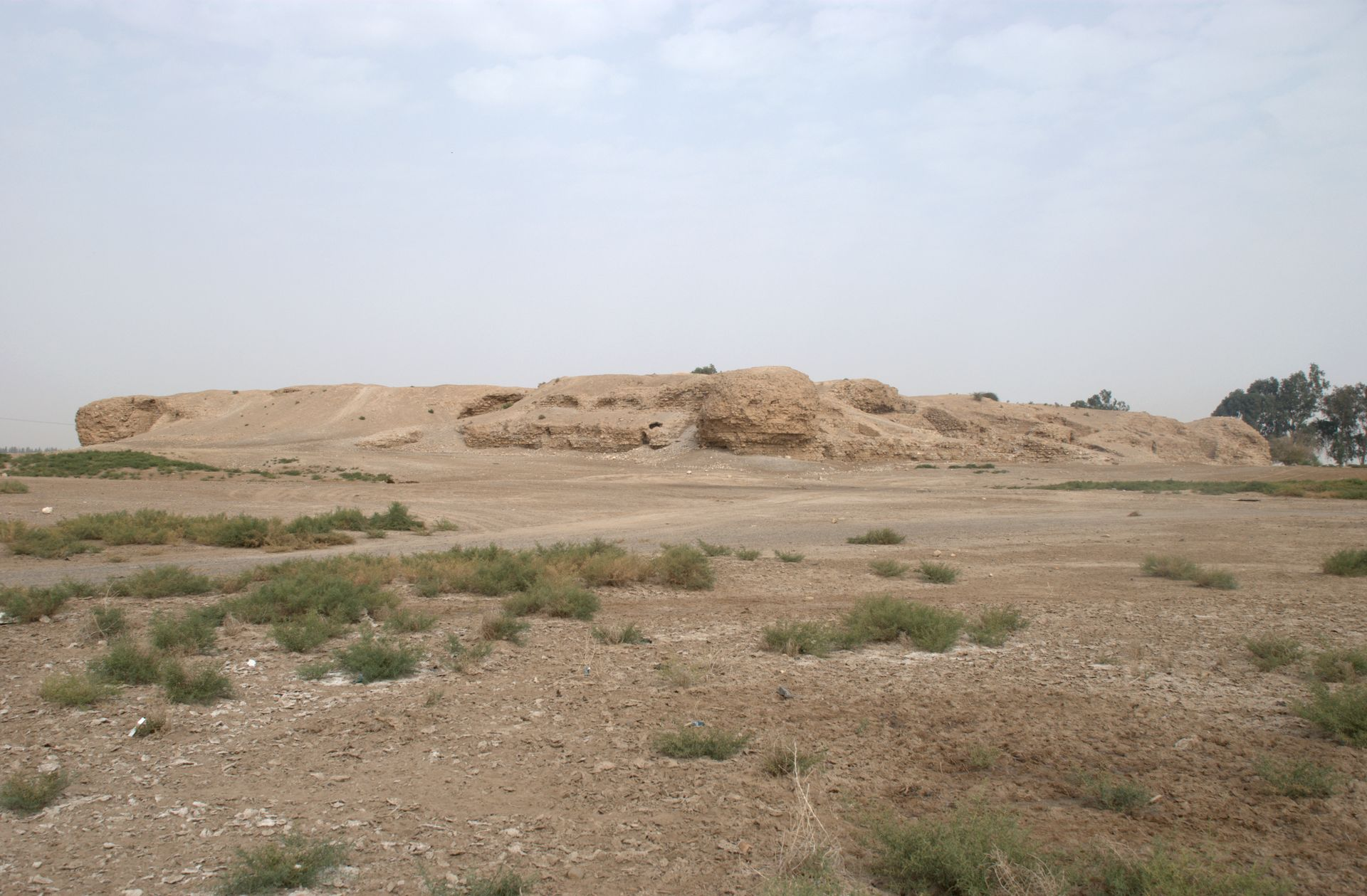
View of the remnants of Hiraqla, a victory monument erected by Harun after the campaign of 806

The longest-lasting impact of Harun's campaign is found in literature. Among the Arabs, several legends or anecdotes, related by sources such as al-Masudi and the Kitab al-Aghani, were associated with it, emphasizing the city's strong fortifications, describing a single combat between a Byzantine and an Arab champion which was decided when the Arab captured the Byzantine by using a lasso, or the terror inspired among the defenders by the Abbasid army's use of large catapults throwing Greek fire-like substances. The Ottoman Turks also placed great importance on Harun's battles with the Byzantines. The account of the 17th-century Ottoman traveller Evliya Çelebi mixes the events of Harun's 782 campaign, when the Arab army had reached the Bosporus, with those of 806, as well as introducing clearly fictional elements such as the manner of Nikephoros' death. According to Evliya, Harun besieged Constantinople twice. The first time the Caliph withdrew, after securing as much land as an oxhide could cover and building a fortress there, in an imitation of the ancient tale of Queen Dido. The second time, Harun marched on Constantinople to avenge the massacre of Muslims living there, and ordered Nikephoros executed by hanging at the Hagia Sophia.

To commemorate his successful campaign, Harun built a victory monument about 8 kilometres (5 mi) west of Raqqa, his principal residence. Known as Hiraqla in local tradition, apparently after Herakleia, it comprises a square structure with sides 100 metres (330 ft) long, surrounded by a circular wall about 500 metres (1,600 ft) in diameter, pierced by four gates in the cardinal directions. The main structure, built from stone taken from churches demolished on Harun's orders in 806–807, has four vaulted halls on the ground floor, and ramps leading to an upper storey, which was left incomplete on Harun's departure for Khurasan and subsequent death.

== Bibliography ==
- Bosworth, C. E., ed. (1989). The History of al-Ṭabarī, Volume XXX: The ʿAbbāsid Caliphate in Equilibrium: The Caliphates of Mūsā al-Hādī and Hārūn al-Rashīd, A.D. 785–809/A.H. 169–192. SUNY Series in Near Eastern Studies. Albany, New York: State University of New York Press. ISBN 978-0-88706-564-4.
- Bonner, Michael (1996). Aristocratic Violence and Holy War: Studies in the Jihad and the Arab–Byzantine Frontier. New Haven, Connecticut: American Oriental Society. ISBN 0-940490-11-0.
- Brooks, E. W. (1923). "Chapter V. (A) The Struggle with the Saracens (717–867)". The Cambridge Medieval History, Vol. IV: The Eastern Roman Empire (717–1453). Cambridge: Cambridge University Press. pp. 119–138. OCLC 241580719.
- Canard, Marius (1926). "Les expéditions des Arabes contre Constantinople dans l'histoire et dans la légende" [The Expeditions of the Arabs Against Constantinople in History and in Legend]. Journal Asiatique (in French) (208): 61–121. ISSN 0021-762X.
- Canard, Marius (1962). "La prise d'Héraclée et les relations entre Hārūn ar-Rashīd et l'empereur Nicéphore Ier" [The Capture of Heraclea and the Relations Between Harun ar-Rashid and the Emperor Nikephoros I]. Byzantion (in French). 32 (32): 345–379. ISSN 0378-2506. JSTOR 44170050.
- El-Cheikh, Nadia Maria (2004). Byzantium Viewed by the Arabs. Cambridge, Massachusetts: Harvard Center of Middle Eastern Studies. ISBN 978-0-932885-30-2.
- El-Hibri, Tayeb (2010). "The empire in Iraq, 763–861". In Robinson, Chase F. (ed.). The New Cambridge History of Islam, Volume 1: The Formation of the Islamic World, Sixth to Eleventh Centuries. Cambridge: Cambridge University Press. pp. 269–304. ISBN 978-0-521-83823-8.
- Haug, Robert (2011). "Frontiers and the State in Early Islamic History: Jihād Between Caliphs and Volunteers". History Compass. 9 (8): 634–643. doi:10.1111/j.1478-0542.2011.00791.x. ISSN 1478-0542.
- Kazhdan, Alexander, ed. (1991). The Oxford Dictionary of Byzantium. Oxford and New York: Oxford University Press. ISBN 0-19-504652-8.
- Kennedy, Hugh (2001). The Armies of the Caliphs: Military and Society in the Early Islamic State. London and New York: Routledge. ISBN 0-415-25093-5.
- Kiapidou, Irini-Sofia (2002). "Campaign of the Arabs in Asia Minor, 806". Encyclopedia of the Hellenic World, Asia Minor. Athens: Foundation of the Hellenic World. Archived from the original on 29 October 2013.
- Mango, Cyril; Scott, Roger (1997). The Chronicle of Theophanes Confessor. Byzantine and Near Eastern History, AD 284–813. Oxford: Oxford University Press. ISBN 0-19-822568-7.
- Meinecke, Michael (1995). "al-Raḳḳa". In Bosworth, C. E.; van Donzel, E.; Heinrichs, W. P. & Lecomte, G. (eds.). The Encyclopaedia of Islam, Second Edition. Volume VIII: Ned–Sam. Leiden: E. J. Brill. pp. 410–414. doi:10.1163/1573-3912_islam_COM_0907. ISBN 978-90-04-09834-3.
- Treadgold, Warren (1988). The Byzantine Revival, 780–842. Stanford, California: Stanford University Press. ISBN 978-0-8047-1462-4.
- Shaban, M. A. (1976). Islamic History, A New Interpretation. Volume 2: A.D. 750–1055 (A.H. 132–448). Cambridge and New York: Cambridge University Press. ISBN 978-0-521-21198-7.
