= Basilica of Saint John the Theologian =

Basilica in Ephesus

Coordinates: 37°57′09″N 27°22′04″E

- Βασιλική του Αγίου Ιωάννη του Θεολόγου (Greek)
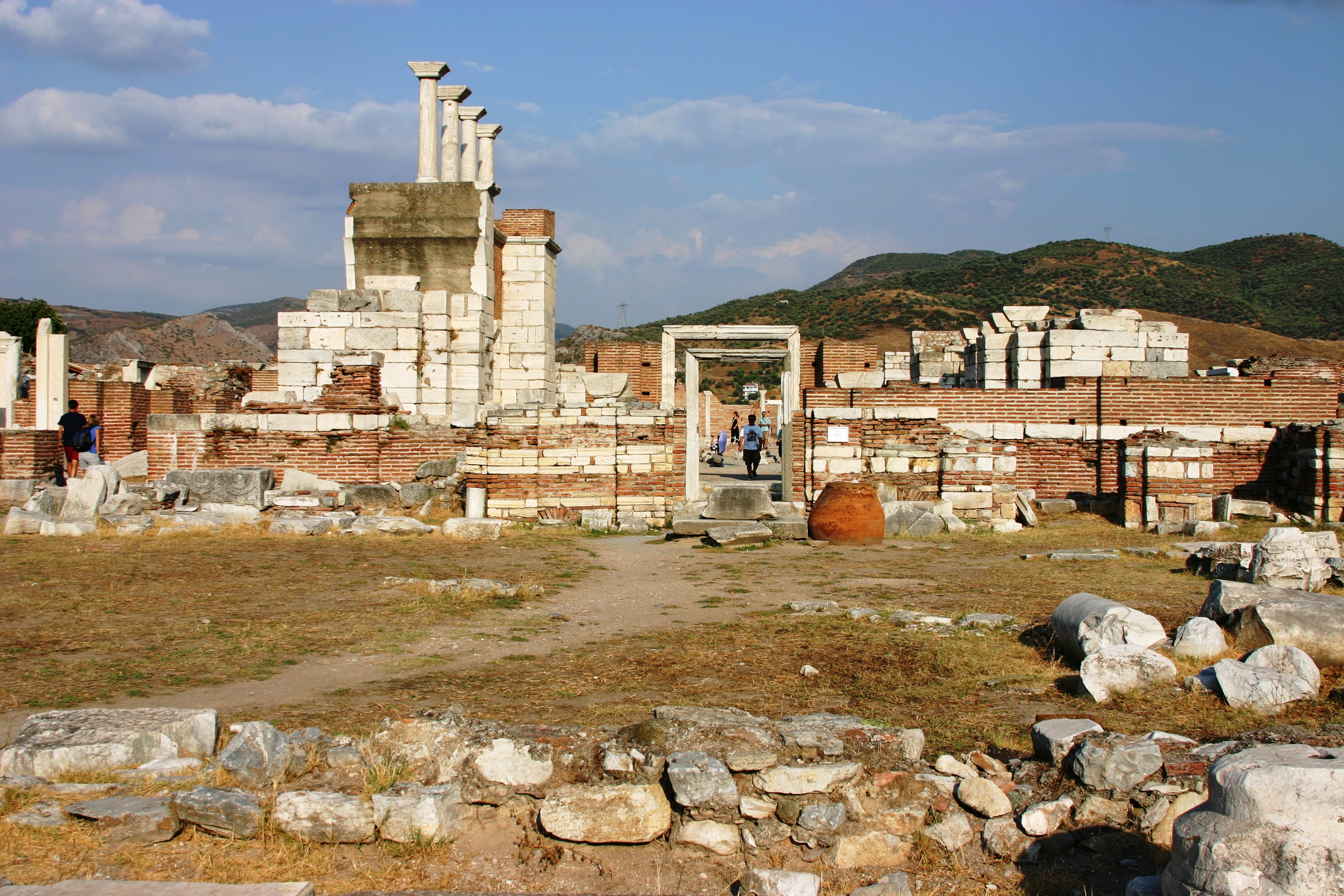
- Ruins of the Basilica of Saint John

- Location within Turkey
- Type: Basilica
- Cultures: Greek, Roman
- Location: Ephesus, Turkey
- Region: Aegean
- Part of: Ancient Greece, Ancient Rome, Byzantium

Site notes
- Condition: In ruins

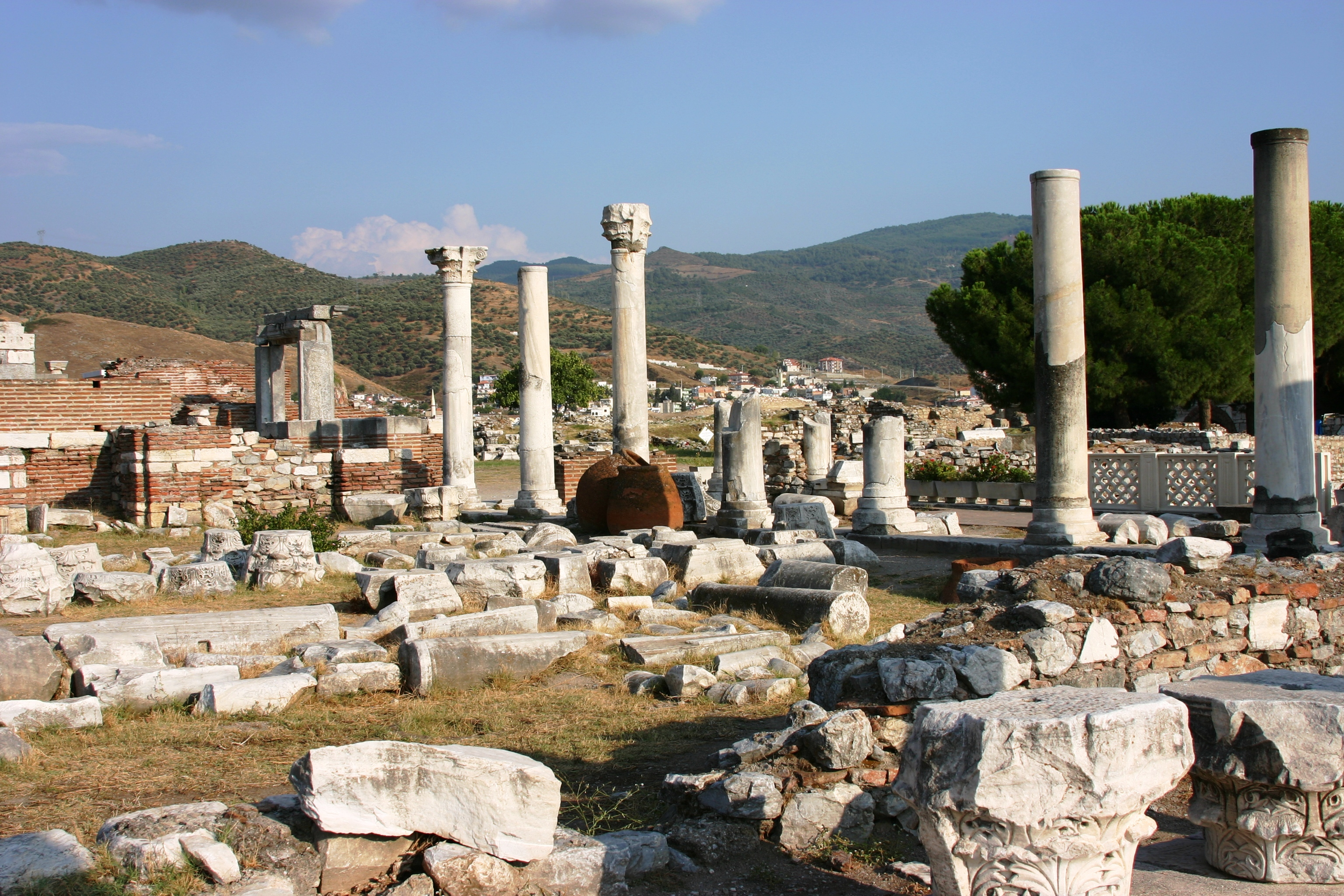
Ruins of the Basilica.

The Basilica of Saint John the Theologian (Greek: Βασιλική του Αγίου Ιωάννη του Θεολόγου) was a basilica in the city of Ephesus. It was constructed by Justinian the Great in the 6th century, at a site where John the Apostle was said to have been buried. It was modeled after the Church of the Holy Apostles in Constantinople.

The ruins of the basilica are on the slopes of Ayasuluk Hill, right next to the İsa Bey Mosque, just below the fortress near the centre of Selçuk, İzmir Province, Turkey and about 3.5 km (2.2 mi) from Ephesus.

== History ==
=== History of the earlier site ===
Ayasuluk Hill is believed to have been the site of the late Bronze Age city of Apasa, capital of the Kingdom of Arzawa. The basilica is believed to have been built over the ruins of the earlier city.

=== Justinian's Church ===
Procopius provides a small description of the Basilica in one of his works, Buildings, whereupon he wrote:

There chanced to be a certain place before the city of Ephesus, lying on a steep slope hilly and bare of soil and incapable of producing crops, even should one attempt to cultivate them, but altogether hard and rough. On that site the natives had set up a church in early times to the Apostle John; this Apostle has been named “the Theologian,” because the nature of God was described by him in a manner beyond the unaided power of man. This church, which was small and in a ruined condition because of its great age, the Emperor Justinian tore down to the ground and replaced by a church so large and beautiful, that, to speak briefly, it resembles very closely in all respects, and is a rival to, the shrine which is dedicated to all the Apostles in the imperial city...

Construction of the church began by 548 and was completed by 565. The building of this church was presided over by Hypatius of Ephesus. As the leading ecclesiastical theoretician and writer of his day, it is possible that he gained the influence of Justinian and had the tomb of Saint John reconstructed. After its completion, it was regarded as one of the holiest churches of its time and was held in great honor, as Procopius notes in his Secret History:

...to the sanctuary of the Apostle John, which was the most holy one there and held in very high honour...

=== Early Middle Ages ===
Emperor Constantine VI visited the Basilica in 797, prayed in it, and donated 100 pounds of gold (or 7,200 nomismata) to the church and its clergy, as he believed the blessing of Apostle John to have been instrumental in his victory at the Battle of Anusan against the Abbasid Caliphate.

=== High Middle Ages ===
The Basilica continued to be a sight of great importance throughout Anatolia. According to historian Clive Foss:

Work was carried out in and around the great Basilica of Saint John throughout the Byzantine period, so that it survived intact for some decades after the Turkish conquest. In the tenth century, it was described as being large and beautiful and in good condition. It was probably at this time that a chapel decorated with frescoes of saints was added on the north side of the church, as well as marble chancel plaques decorated with animals in low relief.

By the 12th century however, amid Seljuk invasions, the Basilica had deteriorated, as hedgehogs and owls lived within the structure, and mosaic pieces were slowly cascading down from the domes. Though, under the Laskaris dynasty, the Basilica had again been restored to its former glory and was even expanded, as attested to by travellers such as Ludolf von Suchem.

=== Destruction and conversion to a mosque ===
When the city of Ephesus fell to the Beylik of Menteshe around 1308, and later to the Beylik of Aydin, the Turks either deported, enslaved or killed most of Ephesus' population, and pillaged the Basilica.

The metropolitan bishop Matthew of Ephesus attempted to reclaim the church and restore it, but he was refused by Hidir, brother of Umur Bey, as the structure had been turned into a mosque and its roof was used by muezzins. Matthew wrote:

But that which distresses us more than the other evils is that living nearby the great church [the great church of St. John now become a mosque] we see the Corybants leaping up on the roof, daily, shouting out aloud the utterances of their worship as loudly as they can. And upon whichever of the churches we happen, we are thrown aside like some hierarchs without cities and without metropolitanates.

== Design ==
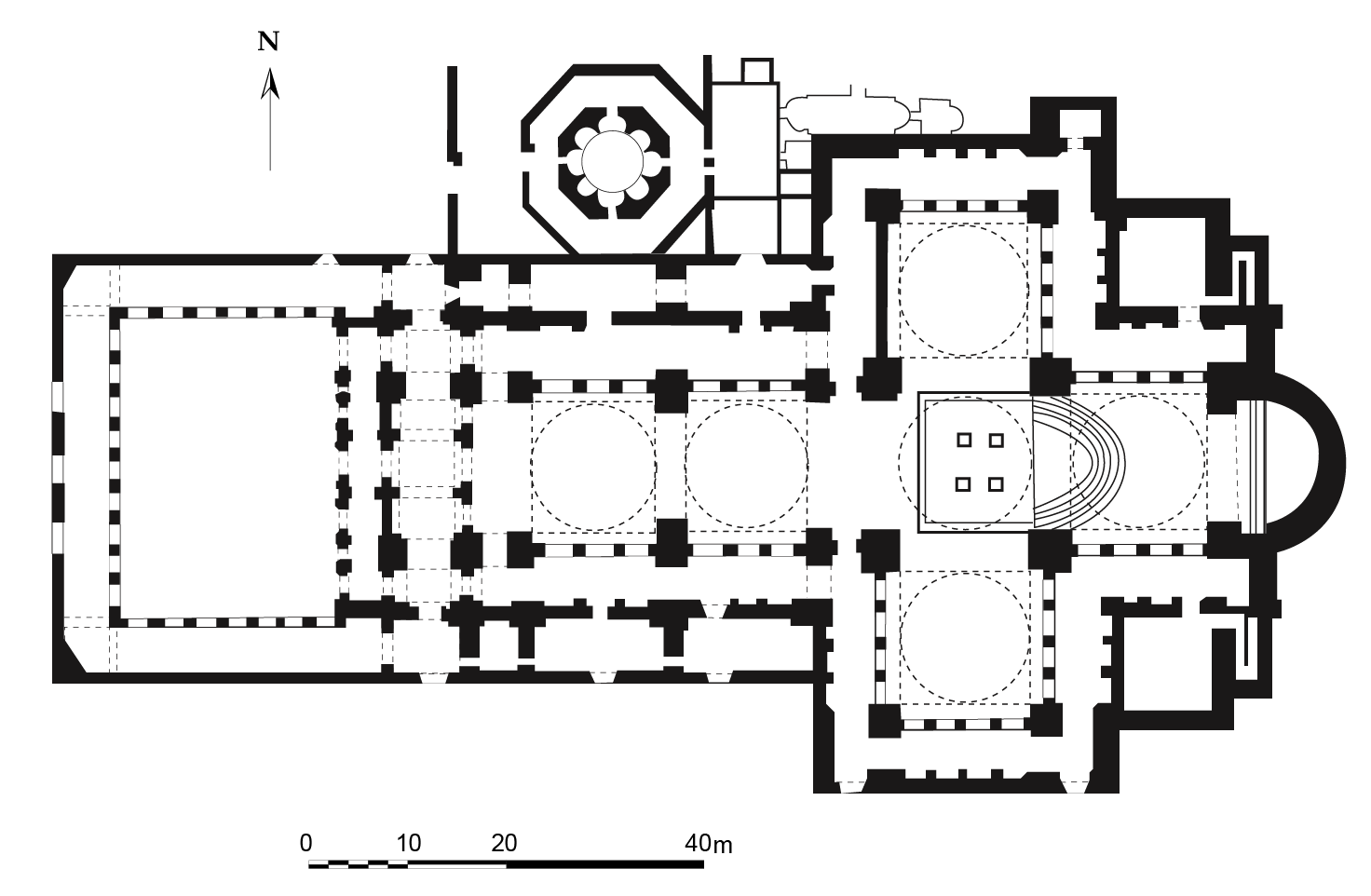
floor plan

=== Materials ===
The basilica was built almost entirely of bricks and stones (ashlar), while the columns would have been made of marble, or have been marble plated, to withstand the weight of the domes above. The use of timber-roofed towers, that were placed over the bay preceding the chancel and the altar, had been adopted as well since the course of the 5th century.

=== Construction ===
The first building to be built on Saint John's tomb was a mausoleum, which also served as a church. In the 4th century, a basilica was built over it during the reign of Theodosius I. Two centuries later, because the site lay in ruins, Justinian began his construction of a much grander church. In comparison, the Theodosian Basilica measured at 246 x 146 feet while Justinian's Basilica measured at 428 x 213 feet. The plan was laid out on the site of Constantine's Apostoleion and would be arranged in a Greek cross pattern. And although the construction of this church was by imperial order, the people of Ephesus were the ones who did much of the building. The marble decorations were made in Constantinople and perhaps in Ephesus as well. The bases, column and capitals of the nave were made and imported from Constantinople or the quarries of Proconnesus. While much of the capital of the eastern part of the church were done by local craftsmen instead, following the Constantinopolitan pattern and model. Even after the reign of Justinian, decorations were still added, most notably by Justin II and Tiberius II.

The most striking feature of the basilica is its massive apse attached to the eastern piers of the crossing with an encircling passage between its two walls, which is believed to have been tunnel-vaulted.

As Procopius stated, the land surrounding the church was very uninhabitable, nor could it be used to cultivate anything. To solve this, Justinian had an aqueduct built near the church, which in time, greatly helped the city of Ephesus and provided the surroundings of the church to flourish throughout the centuries.

=== Exterior ===
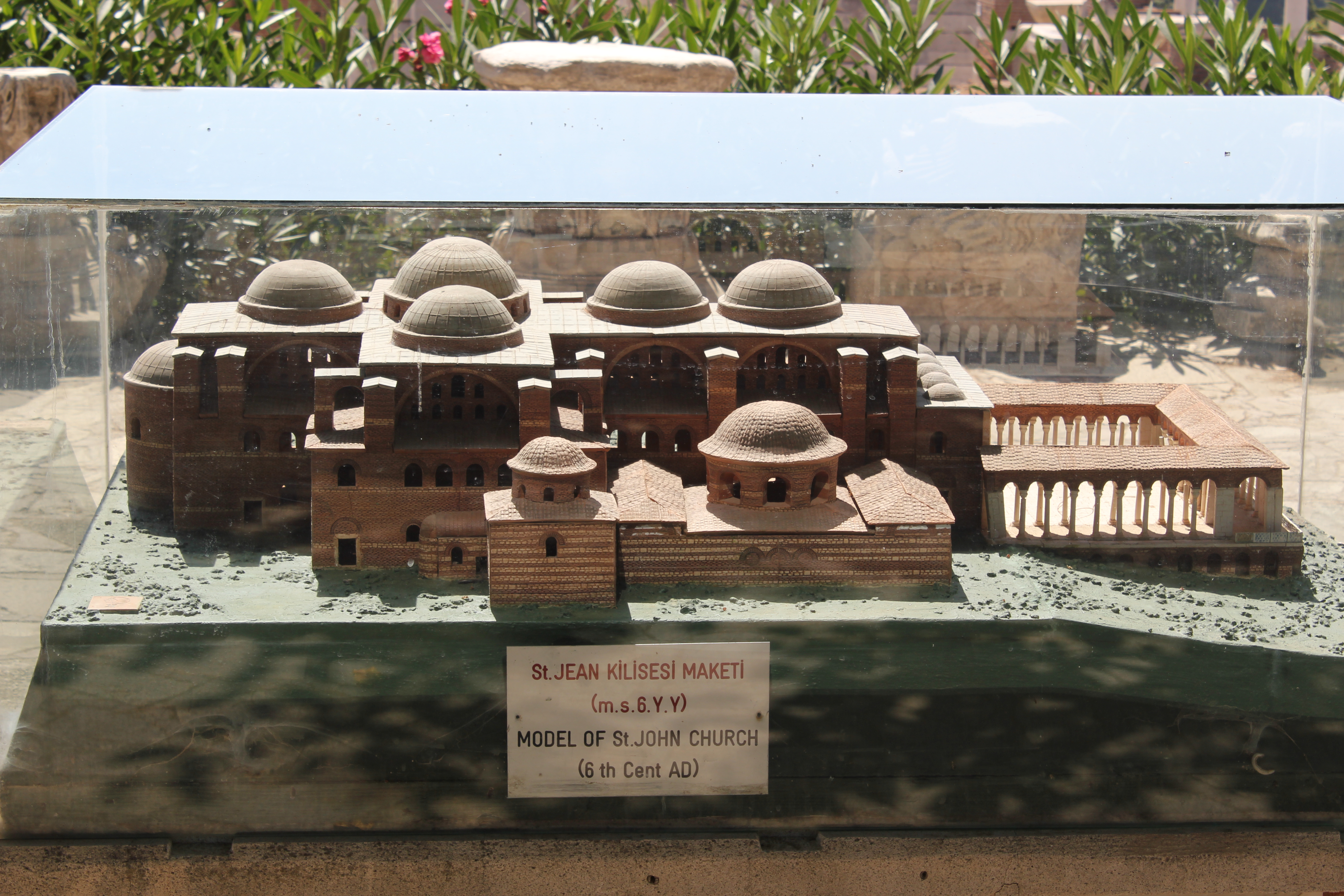
Hypothetical model

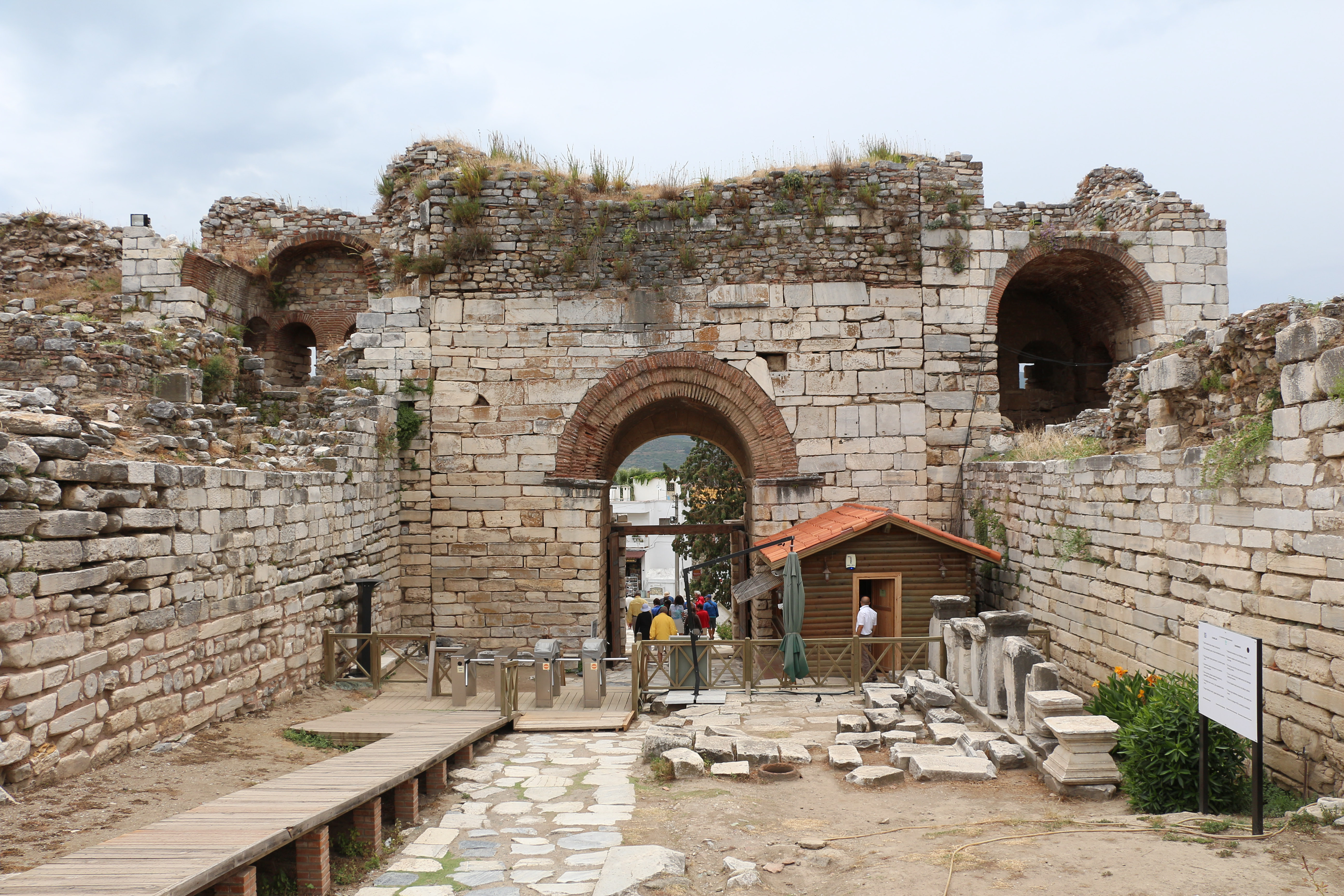
Persecution Gate leading to the Basilica

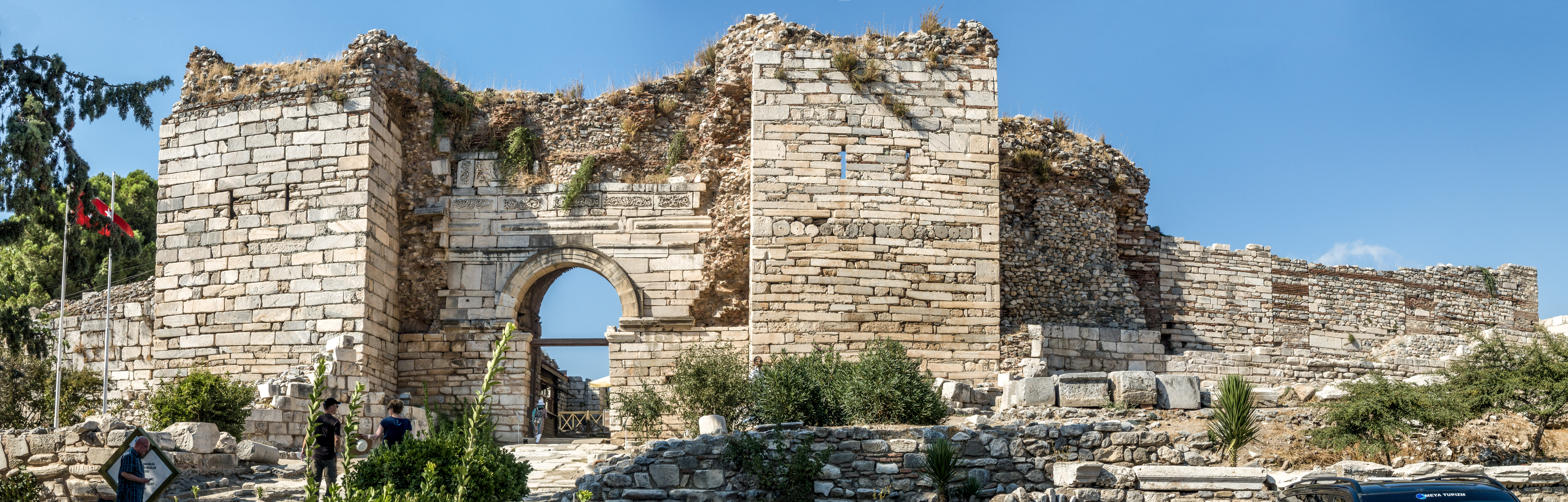
Narrow angle panoramic image of the front of the Basilica

With its resemblance to the Church of the Holy Apostles, the Basilica of Saint John also took on the cruciform in its design. The basilica was a domed basilica where the domes were placed over the central crossing, choir, transepts and the nave. Five domes rested on solid piers in the corners of the cross and surmounted the arms and center crossing. To hold such domes in place, massive marble pillars were built and erected to support the domes. Much like the Church of the Holy Apostles, the Basilica was based on the concept of multiplying the standard element, using short barrel-vaults to expand the square, domed bay into a cross shape. The cupolas of the church would be entirely covered in mosaics as well. Prior to Theodora's death in 548, Justinian had both her monogram and his placed on the capitals.

The main entrance gate to the basilica was called the “Gate of Persecution”, while atrium walls that were built would have surrounded the basilica itself. The walls would have consisted of towers that were either empty or used as bastions.

The north side of the church also had a large octagonal baptistery, resembling that of Saint Mary. Near it was a rectangular room with a marble floor and an apse paved with mosaic. An inscription over the door identified it as the secreton where the bishop would have been when he presided as judge. The inscription also shows that it might have been completed during the time Johannes was bishop, who may have been around during the late 6th century.

=== Interior ===
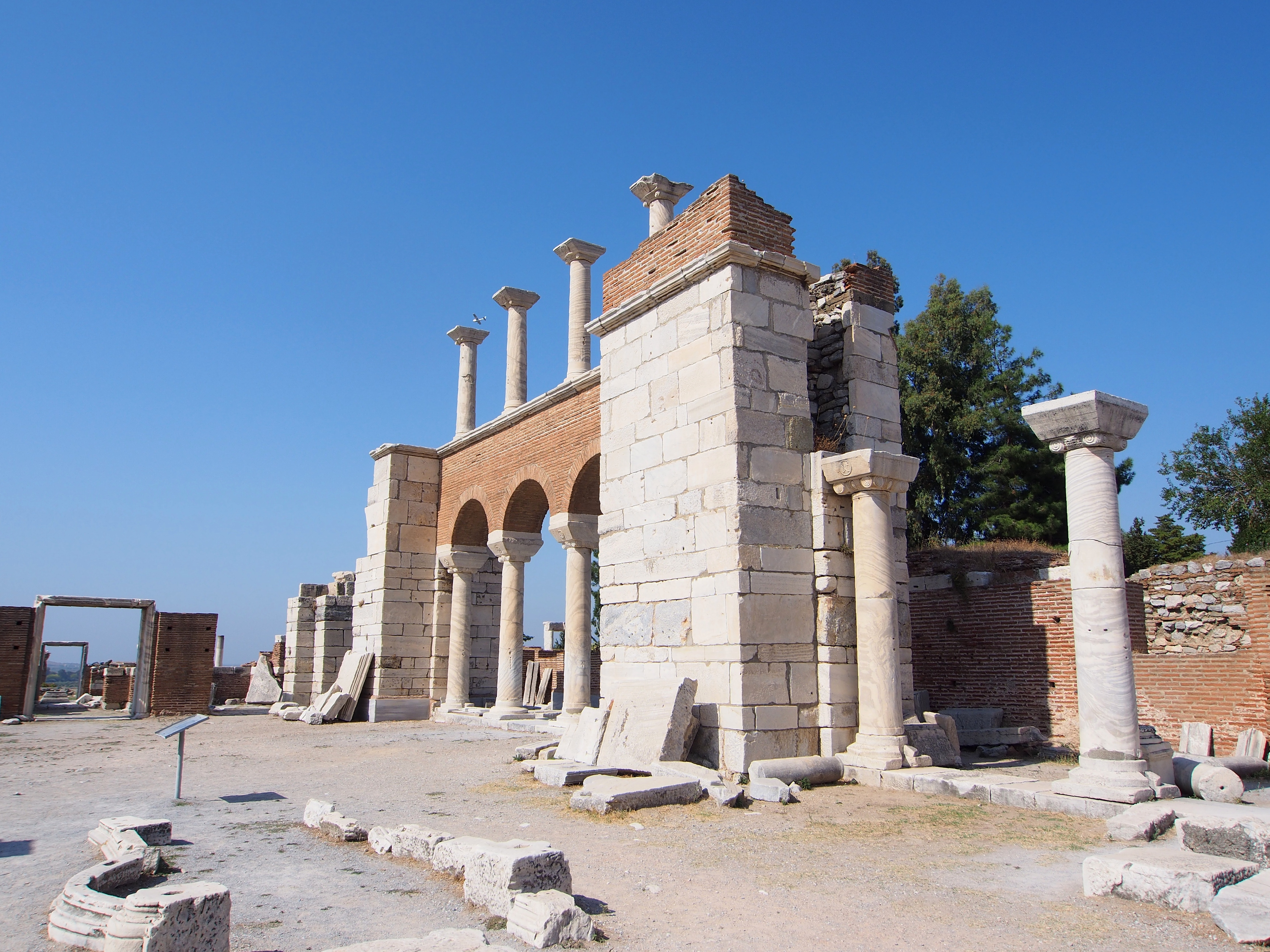
Partial reconstruction

The interior of the vault within the church was covered in mosaics, while the walls and pillars were covered in marble plates and decorated in different colours. The floors were also covered in mosaics. Numerous parts of the Basilica were of different arrangement, which gave the impression of a large quantity of beautiful enormous oriental carpets covering the entire church “in a fairy-like manner”. Directly beneath the altar lay a crypt with several rooms and of those, the tomb of St. John itself. On the altar itself, the inscription of the 14th verse of the 132nd Psalm can be read, which reads:

This is my resting place forever, here will I dwell.

The church's interior would have been covered in frescoes. Hypatius, bishop of Ephesus, was known for advocating the use of icons in the church. After the completion of the church, the interior was covered by icons, representations of saints, and scenes from the Old and New Testaments. Paintings would have included those of Christ raising Lazarus from the dead and Christ crowning Justinian and Theodora. Aside from these, other possible epigrams would have appeared inside the church, one of them being the first book of the Greek Anthology, and others being paintings reflecting the origins of the church as an imperial commission.

=== Legends and miracles ===
During his time and until his death in Ephesus, Saint John preached about Christianity. According to legend, before he died, Christ, along with all the other Apostles, visited and said to him:

Come, my beloved one, and join me and all other brethren of thine at my table; the time has finally come to do so,...the Sunday next, thou wilt come to stay henceforth with me.

As the story unfolds, the following Sunday, John continued with his preaching of Christianity before finally informing his disciples of his time. Then he entered the cave of his church whereupon an intense light shone, preventing his disciples from entering further. When the light dissipated, so did John. His legend was furthered when the opening of his tomb during Constantine the Great's reign yielded no body nor relics. Another fact that continues to advance the legend of Saint John's assumption into Heaven is the fact that while all the other Saints' body or relic has been claimed by at least one or more city/church, John (along with Virgin Mary and Saint Joseph) is the only Saint whose body is not claimed by anyone nor anywhere.

It was also said that John is not dead in, but sleeping beneath his tomb, and each time he breathed, he would cause the dust around his altar to stir, which in turn, made them holy. Because of this, the dust, called "manna", was said to be able to cure the sick.

=== Pilgrimages and flasks ===
The stories of Saint John and the manna continued to grow and even caught the attention of Augustine of Hippo, who could not dismiss them outright. The Anglo-Saxon Willibald, who later became a bishop and a saint, also heard of this and was one of the first of many recorded pilgrims to the tomb of John.

The tomb itself acted upon its miracle every year on 8 May, during an all night-festal in honor of the Saint, for nearly a thousand years, prompting many pilgrimages throughout the medieval period.

The pilgrims who journeyed to Ephesus did not leave empty-handed. Flasks were produced at John's tomb for the pilgrims. These flasks usually had the Saint's image designed on to it as well. They were used to collect the dusts that would appear around St. John's tomb, which was then carried back to the pilgrims' respective homelands, where it was said to have performed miracles by curing sickness and even calm storms on land and sea.

== See also ==
- Ancient Roman and Byzantine domes
- Metropolis of Ephesus

== Sources ==
- Foss, Clive (1979). Ephesus After Antiquity. Cambridge University Press.
- Juan López, Juan Bautista (2024). Manuel Gabalas: Biography, Intellectual Network, Works and Thought. Department of Medieval Studies of the Central European University Private University, Vienna.
- Ramsay, William (1890). The Historical Geography of Asia Minor. Royal Geographical Society.
- Treu, M. (1901). Matthaios metropolit von Ephesos: Uebcr sein leben und seine schriften. Potsdam.
- Treadgold, Warren (1988). The Byzantine Revival, 780–842.
- Vryonis, Speros (1971). The Decline of Medieval Hellenism in Asia Minor and the Process of Islamization from the Eleventh through the Fifteenth Century. University of California Press. ISBN 0-520-01597-5.
