= Peter of Goulaion =

9th-century Byzantine abbot

Peter of Goulaion (Greek: Πέτρος τοῦ Γουλαίου or ὁ Γουλαιάτης, romanized: Petros tou Goulaiou/ho Goulaiates) was a Byzantine abbot of the early 9th century, who was used by Emperor Nikephoros I as envoy.

He was abbot (hegumenos) of the monastery of Goulaion, whose exact location and identity are not known. He is commonly identified with the Petrus abbas who was one of the leaders (along with Michahel episcopus, identified with Michael of Synnada) of an embassy sent by Nikephoros I to Charlemagne in 802/3. In 806, during the invasion of Asia Minor by the Abbasid caliph Harun al-Rashid, Peter and Michael, along with Gregory, the steward of Amastris, were sent to the Caliph to propose negotiate a peace.

He may also be identifiable with the unnamed abbot of Goulaion, who according to Theodore Stoudites abandoned the veneration of icons in c. 816, but later (c. 824/6) returned to an iconophile position.

== Sources ==
- Janin, Raymond (1975). Les églises et les monastères des grands centres byzantins: Bithynie, Hellespont, Latros, Galèsios, Trébizonde, Athènes, Thessalonique. Géographie ecclésiastique de l'Empire byzantin, Vol. 2 (in French). Paris: Institut français d'études byzantines. ISBN 978-90-429-3119-0.
- Lilie, Ralph-Johannes; Ludwig, Claudia; Pratsch, Thomas; Zielke, Beate (2013). Prosopographie der mittelbyzantinischen Zeit Online. Berlin-Brandenburgische Akademie der Wissenschaften. Nach Vorarbeiten F. Winkelmanns erstellt (in German). Berlin and Boston: De Gruyter.
