= Heraclea Cybistra =

Town of ancient Cappadocia or Cilicia

- Ἡράκλεια Κύβιστρα (Ancient Greek)
- Location within Turkey
- 37°30′53″N 34°02′22″E
- Location: Turkey
- Region: Konya Province

Heraclea Cybistra (Ancient Greek: Ἡράκλεια Κύβιστρα), or simply Heraclea or Herakleia (Ἡράκλεια), also transliterated as Heracleia, was a town of ancient Cappadocia or Cilicia; located at the site of modern Ereğli in Konya Province, Turkey.

== History ==
=== Middle Bronze ===
In the Hittite Old Kingdom, it was known as Hupisna/Hubisna.

=== Late Bronze ===
In the Hittite New Kingdom (Hittite Empire), Hupisna was part of the empire.

=== Iron Age ===
Dated to the 8th century BC, about 12 km south of Heraclea, is the Hittite İvriz relief.

=== Hellenistic to Crusader periods ===
It had some importance in Hellenistic times owing to its position near the point where the road to the Cilician Gates enters the hills. It lay in the way of armies and was more than once sacked by the Arab invaders of Asia Minor (by Harun al-Rashid in 806 and al-Ma'mun in 832). Heraclea was also the site of multiple battles in the Crusade of 1101, wherein Seljuk forces dealt a decisive blow to multiple contingents of the Crusader armies.

There’s no clear indication that Cybistra and Heraclea Cybistra were situated at different locations.

== See also ==
- List of ancient Greek cities
- Cybistra
