= Thebasa =

Fortified place in Asia Minor

Coordinates: 37°17′37″N 33°50′12″E

Thebasa (Greek: Θήβασα) was a fortified place in Asia Minor in Classical Antiquity that was noted by Pliny as a city of ancient Lycaonia, situated in Tauros.

Later, Thebasa survived (as "Dabasa" in Muslim accounts) to be taken from the Byzantine Empire during the Abbasid invasion of Asia Minor (806). The site, apparently deserted since, has not been securely identified. Sir William Mitchell Ramsay suggested that Thebasa was the fortified high place of Hyde and gave reasons for locating the city and its fortress in the neighborhood of Kara Bunar, Turkey.

Modern scholars reject the identification of Thebasa with Hyde, and tentatively place Hyde's site near Divle, Asiatic Turkey.

In 2022, a Polish diplomat Robert D. Rokicki found Thebasa in the Pinarkaya village of Ayrancı District in Karaman Province.
