= Tzitzak =

Byzantine empress from 741 to 750

Empress of the Byzantine Empire
- Tenure: 741–750 (with Anna, 741–743)
- Born: Tzitzak / Čiček; 8th century
- Died: c. 750
- Spouse: Constantine V
- Issue: Leo IV the Khazar
Names
- Tzitzak (baptismal name Irene)
- Dynasty: Ashina (by birth); Isaurian (by marriage)
- Father: Bihar

Tzitzak (Greek: Τζιτζάκ; died c. 750), baptised Irene (Greek: Εἰρήνη, romanized: Irini), was a Khazar princess, the daughter of khagan Bihar, who became empress by marriage to Byzantine Empire Emperor Constantine V (r. 741–775).

== Etymology ==
According to the most widely accepted view, Tzitzak is likely a Hellenized form of a Turkic word derived from Proto-Turkic čeček, cognate with Chuvash чечек and Turkish çiçek, all meaning “flower.”

However, Marcel Erdal notes that Constantine VII used tzitzak to denote the empress's garment and deems Moravcsik's idea that Tzitzak was her personal name "far-fetched". Therefore, Erdal thinks that tzitzak more likely described the colourfulness of the empress's garment; Erdal additionally reminds readers of Hebrew צִיצִית ṣiṣiṯ 'fringed Jewish ceremonial shawl' and ṣiṣiyoṯ 'fringes'.

== Life ==
In 732, the Byzantine Empire was under threat of invasion from the Umayyad Caliphate. Seeking allies, Leo III the Isaurian sent an embassy to Bihar, Khagan of the Khazars. The alliance was sealed with the marriage of Tzitzak to Constantine V, son and junior co-ruler of Leo.

Tzitzak was escorted to Constantinople for her marriage. Constantine was about fourteen years old, while Tzitzak may have been even younger as she would not give birth for eighteen years. Tzitzak became a Christian under the baptismal name Irene. Tzitzak's wedding gown became famous, starting a new fashion craze in Constantinople for male robes called tzitzakia.

=== Empress ===
The chronicle of Theophanes the Confessor records that Tzitzak learned to read religious texts. He describes her as pious and contrasts her with the "impiety" of her father-in-law and husband: 'she learned Holy Scripture and lived piously, thus reproving the impiety of those men [Leo and Constantine]'. The emperors Leo III and Constantine V were iconoclasts while Theophanes was an iconodule monk. His praise probably reflected the fact that Irene herself shared his views.

It is uncertain whether her mother-in-law Maria was still the senior empress at the time of Tzitzak's marriage. Leo III died on 18 June 741. Constantine V succeeded him with Irene as empress. However, civil war broke out almost immediately as Artabasdos, brother-in-law of Constantine, claimed the throne for himself. The civil war lasted until 2 November 743. The role of Irene in the war is not described by Theophanes.

On 25 January 750, Constantine and Tzitzak had a son, Leo, who would succeed his father as Emperor Leo IV—better known as "Leo the Khazar". Leo's birth is the last mention of Irene in the historical record. By the following year, Constantine was already married to his second wife Maria. Lynda Garland has suggested Tzitzak died in childbirth.

== Bibliography ==
- Kevin Alan Brook. The Jews of Khazaria. 2nd ed. Rowman & Littlefield Publishers, Inc, 2006.
- Douglas M. Dunlop. The History of the Jewish Khazars, Princeton, N.J.: Princeton University Press, 1954.
- The Oxford Dictionary of Byzantium, Oxford University Press, 1991.

Royal titles
| Preceded by Maria | Byzantine Empress consort 741–750 with Anna (741–743) | Succeeded by Maria |
