= Nikephoros (son of Artabasdos) =

- Emperor of the Romans
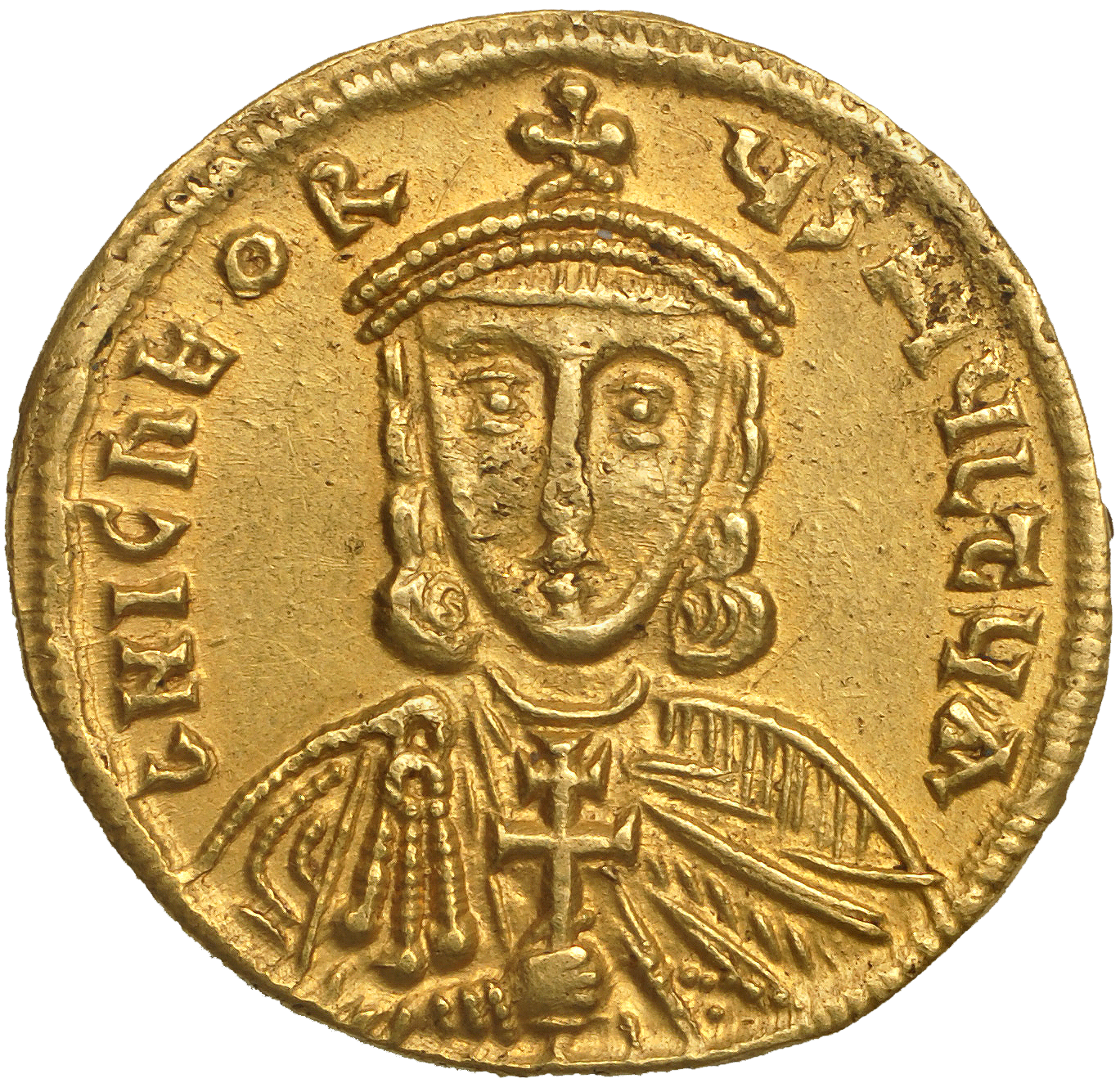
- Solidus of Nikephoros, wearing crown and chlamys, and holding patriarchal cross

Byzantine co-emperor
- Reign: July 741 – 2 November 743
- Predecessor: Constantine V
- Successor: Constantine V
- Died: after 743
- Dynasty: Isaurian
- Father: Artabasdos
- Mother: Anna

Nikephoros (Greek: Νικηφόρος, romanized: Nikēphóros) was junior Byzantine Emperor from 741 to 743. He was crowned after his father, Artabasdos (r. 741–743) usurped Emperor Constantine V (r. 741–775). Constantine seized power again on 2 November 743, and Nikephoros, Artabasdos, and Niketas were blinded and confined in the Chora Church.

== Life ==
Nikephoros was made strategos of Thrace by his father Artabasdos soon after he usurped the throne from Byzantine Emperor Constantine V, around June or July of 741. He was elevated to junior co-emperor at some point in 741.

After Constantine defeated Artabasdos on 2 November 743, he had Artabasdos, Nikephoros, and Niketas humiliated in the Hippodrome of Constantinople before being blinded and confined in the Chora Church.

== Bibliography ==
- Brubaker, Leslie; Haldon, John (2011). Byzantium in the Iconoclast Era, c. 680-850: A History. Cambridge University Press. ISBN 978-0-521-43093-7.
- Garland, Lynda (2006). Byzantine Women: Varieties of Experience 800-1200. Ashgate. ISBN 978-0-7546-5737-8.
- Oikonomides, Nicolas (1986). A Collection of Dated Byzantine Lead Seals. Washington, D.C.: Dumbarton Oaks Research Library and Collection. ISBN 978-0-88402-150-6.
