= Byzantine Empire under the Isaurian dynasty =

Period of Byzantine history from 717 to 802

Byzantine Empire Βασιλεία Ῥωμαίων (Ancient Greek) Imperium Romanum (Latin)
- 717–802
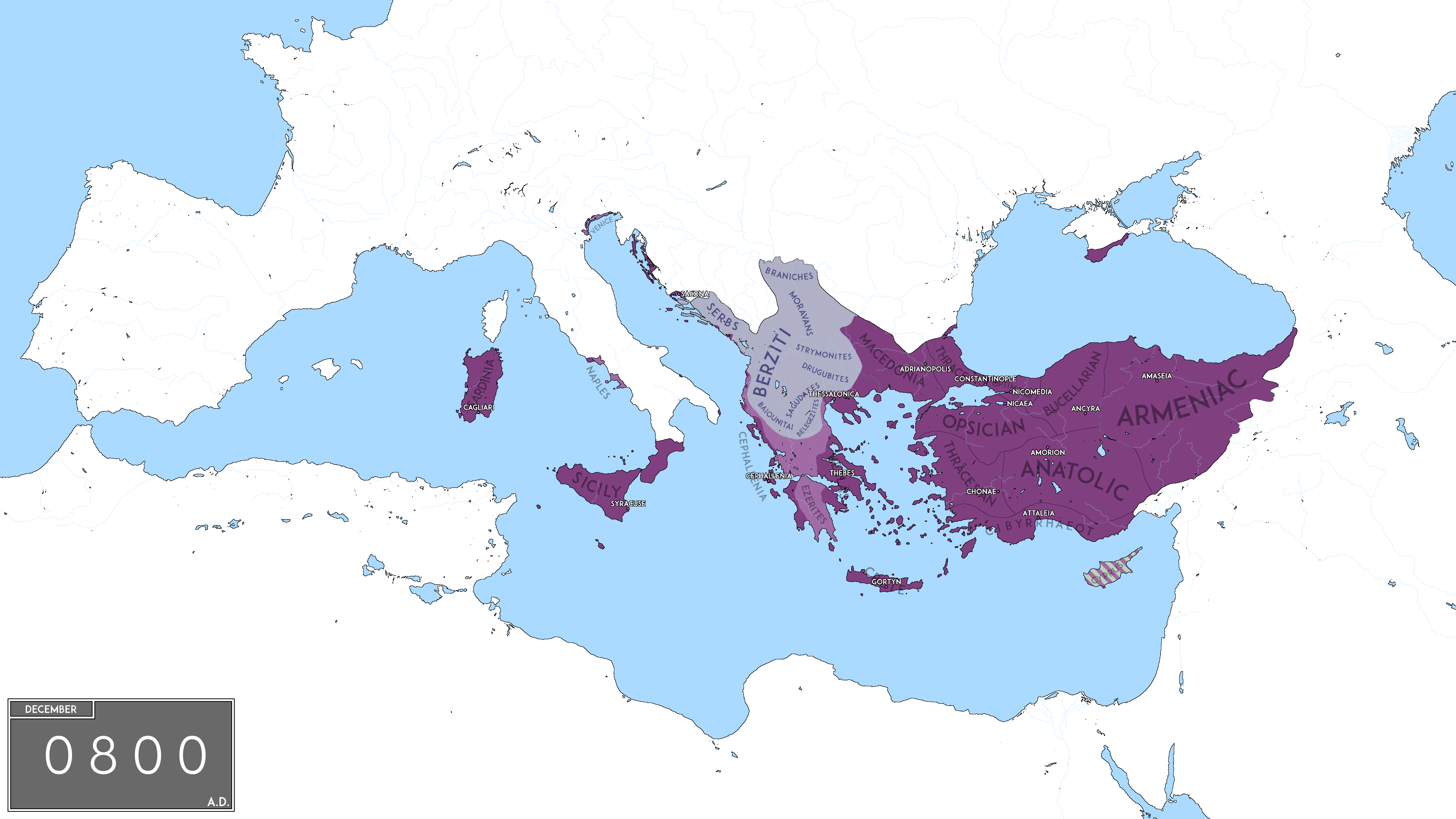
- The Byzantine Empire after the coronation of Charlemagne as Imperator Romanorum, 800
- Capital: Constantinople
- Common languages: Greek; Latin (in the Exarchate of Ravenna until c. 751)
- Government: Monarchy
- Emperor
  - 717–741: Leo III the Isaurian
  - 741–775: Constantine V
  - 775–780: Leo IV
  - 780–797: Constantine VI (with his mother Irene serving as regent from 780–790 and as co-ruler from 792–797)
  - 797–802: Irene of Athens (as sole ruler)
- History
  - Accession of Leo III the Isaurian: 717
  - Deposition of Irene of Athens: 802
Preceded by
Twenty Years' Anarchy
Succeeded by
Byzantine Empire under the Nikephorian dynasty
Principality of Serbia (early medieval)
First Bulgarian Empire

The Byzantine Empire was ruled by the Isaurian dynasty (or Syrian dynasty) from 717 to 802. The Isaurian emperors were successful in defending and consolidating the empire against the caliphates after the onslaught of the early Muslim conquests, but were less successful in Europe, where they suffered setbacks against the Bulgars, had to give up the Exarchate of Ravenna, and lost influence over Italy and the papacy to the growing power of the Franks.

The Isaurian dynasty is chiefly associated with Byzantine iconoclasm, an attempt to restore divine favour by purifying the Christian faith from all veneration of figural Christian iconography, which resulted in considerable internal turmoil.

By the end of the Isaurian dynasty in 802, the Byzantines were continuing to fight the Arabs and the Bulgars for their very existence, with matters made more complicated when Pope Leo III crowned Charlemagne as emperor of the Romans, which was seen as an attempt at making the Carolingian state the successor to the Roman Empire.

== Background: Byzantium in the 7th century ==
The Heraclian dynasty (610–695 and 705–711) faced heavy challenges. After successfully overcoming the Sassanid Persians, the Emperor Heraclius (r. 610–641) and his exhausted realm were faced with the sudden onset of the Muslim expansion from Arabia into the Levant.

Following the Muslim conquest of Syria, the rich province of Egypt, the Empire's chief source of grain and tax revenue, had fallen to the Arabs as well. The Byzantines also faced Arab attacks through Libya against the Exarchate of Africa, against Cilicia, which controlled the southern passes into Asia Minor, now the Empire's last major contiguous territory, and against the Armenian Highland, the Empire's chief source of manpower and a vital buffer between the now Arab-dominated Syrian Desert region and the northeastern passage into Asia Minor. These three areas would be the main fields of Byzantine-Arab contention during the next half-century. The Arabs continued to make headway, most notably constructing a navy that successfully challenged Byzantine supremacy in the Mediterranean. The outbreak of the Muslim civil war in 656 bought the Byzantines time, and emperor Constans II (r. 641–668) reinforced his position in the Balkans and Italy. His successor, Constantine IV (r. 668–685), was able to beat off the First Arab Siege of Constantinople (674–678), and in its aftermath move into the counteroffensive, securing Asia Minor, recovering Cilicia and forcing the Caliphate to pay tribute. At the same time however, he was defeated by the Bulgar khan Asparukh, and was forced to accept his people's settlement in Byzantine lands south of the Danube. With the first deposition of Constantine IV's son and heir Justinian II in 695 began a period of troubles that lasted almost a quarter-century and brought a succession of disasters that nearly brought about the downfall of the Byzantine state. Carthage finally fell in 697 and a Byzantine recovery attempt defeated next year. Cilicia was conquered by the Arabs and turned into a base for raiding expeditions that penetrated deep into Asia Minor, sacking its forts and cities, while the Caucasus was brought under firm Muslim control. Finally, the Umayyad caliph Sulayman ibn Abd al-Malik (r. 715–717) began preparing another huge expedition to conquer Constantinople.

At the same time, the disasters of the 7th century saw major changes in the society and nature of what remained of the Empire: the urbanised, cosmopolitan civilisation of Late Antiquity came to an end, and the Medieval era began. With the decline of most cities to a small, fortified urban cores that functioned merely as administrative centres, society became largely agrarian, while education and intellectual life almost vanished. The loss of the Empire's richest provinces, coupled with successive invasions, reduced the imperial economy to a relatively impoverished state, compared to the resources available to the Caliphate. The monetary economy persisted, but the barter economy experienced a revival as well. Administrative practice also changed: alongside the continued existence of the late Roman provincial system, the surviving field armies were reorganised into the theme system as a means to preserve the remaining imperial territory, although the extensive power concentrated in the hands of the thematic commanders, the strategoi, made them prone to rebel. At the same time, the central bureaucracy in Constantinople also rose in importance. In the religious field, the loss of the Monophysite eastern provinces ended the need for the unsuccessful compromise doctrine of Monotheletism, which was abandoned at the Third Council of Constantinople in 680, while the Quinisext Council in 692 saw the promotion of the interests and views of the Patriarchate of Constantinople against the See of Rome.

== The Empire in crisis, 705–717 ==
Map of the Byzantine Empire with its themes ca. 717

After Justinian II's second overthrow, the Byzantine Empire spiralled into another era of chaos matched only by Phocas' mishandling of the last Persian War. Philippikos Bardanes, the Crimean rebel who seized the throne proved to be totally incompetent for rule. Rather than face the looming threat of the Bulgars or the Arabs, he intended to reignite the religious controversies by imposing the much hated Heraclian Monothelitism. When King Tervel of Bulgaria (who was an ally of Justinian II) invaded Thrace, Bardanes had no choice but to summon the troops of the Opsician Theme to combat the Bulgars. Unfortunately for the Emperor, the troops had no loyalty whatsoever to him and after the ritual blinding he was replaced in June 713 by the chief secretary of the Emperor, Artemios.

Artemios was crowned as Anastasios II. Anastasios gave the Empire a brief taste of good leadership, improving the walls of the capital and filling the granaries of the capital to bursting point, in order that the newly reported Arab invasion be dealt with. Every citizen was told to gather enough food for three years for if the Arabs were to reach the straits it would undoubtedly be a lengthy siege. However, Anastasios proved too good for the Empire; in an effort to avert the Arab siege of the Capital, Anastasios planned a preemptive strike against the invaders, using Rhodes as a base. However the Opsician Theme once more revolted and Anastasios found himself in a Thessalonika monastery by 715.

The Opsicians chose Theodosios, an unwilling tax-collector, to rule the Empire. The choice was hardly based upon his skills; when Leo the Isaurian, strategos of the Anatolic theme, asked the Senate and the Patriarch for his support in becoming emperor, it took little persuading to obtain it.

== Leo III the Isaurian, 717–741 ==
Leo III, who would become the founder of the so-called Isaurian dynasty, was actually born in Germanikeia in northern Syria c. 685; his alleged origin from Isauria derives from a reference in Theophanes the Confessor, which however may be a later addition. After being raised to spatharios by Justinian II, he fought the Arabs in Abasgia, and was appointed as strategos of the Anatolics by Anastasios II. Following the latter's fall, in 716 Leo allied himself with Artabasdos, the general of the Armeniacs, and was proclaimed emperor while two Arab armies, one under the Caliph's brother Maslamah ibn Abd al-Malik, campaigned in Asia Minor. Leo averted an attack by Maslamah by clever negotiations, in which he promised to recognise the Caliph's suzerainty, but on 25 March 717, he entered Constantinople and deposed Theodosios.

=== Arab siege of Constantinople and its aftermath ===
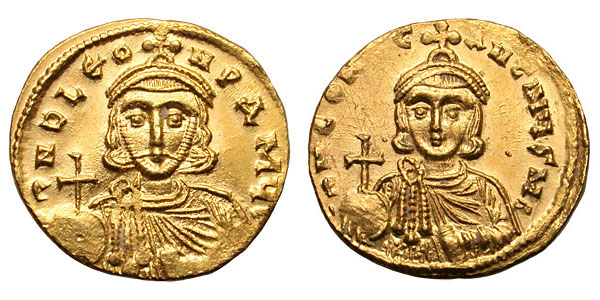
Gold solidus of Leo III showing his son and heir, Constantine V

Within months, the new Emperor faced his first great challenge, with a massive Muslim attack on the imperial capital: the Caliphate's army and navy, led by Maslamah, numbered some 120,000 men and 1,800 ships according to the sources. Whatever the real number, it was a huge force, far larger than the Imperial army. Thankfully for Leo and the Empire, Anastasios II had repaired and strengthened the capital's sea walls. In addition, the Emperor concluded an alliance with the Bulgar khan Tervel, who agreed to harass the invaders' rear.

From July 717 to August 718, the city was besieged by land and sea by the Muslims, who built an extensive double line of circumvallation and contravallation on the landward side, isolating the capital. Their attempt to complete the blockade by sea however failed when the Byzantine navy employed Greek fire against them; the Arab fleet kept well off the city walls, leaving Constantinople's supply routes open. Forced to extend the siege into winter, the besieging army suffered horrendous casualties from the cold and the lack of provisions. In spring, new reinforcements were sent by the new caliph, Umar ibn Abd al-Aziz (r. 717–720), by sea from Africa and Egypt and over land through Asia Minor. The crews of the new fleets were composed mostly of Christians, who began defecting in large numbers, while the land forces were ambushed and defeated in Bithynia. As famine and an epidemic continued to plague the Arab camp, the siege was abandoned on 15 August 718. On its return, the Arab fleet suffered further casualties to storms and an eruption of the volcano of Thera.

Even during the siege, Leo had been able to stifle attempts at secession: his troops swiftly overthrew a revolt in Sicily, where a certain Basil Onomagoulos was declared emperor. In 719, he also weathered an attempt by the deposed Anastasios II to recover his throne with Bulgar help. Leo further strengthened his position by crowning his wife Maria as Augusta in 718 and his son Constantine as co-emperor in 720. Profiting from the weakened state of the Caliphate after the enormous losses they had suffered before Constantinople, Leo was able to launch a counter-offensive which achieved some success. The Arabs soon recovered however, and from 720 launched annual raids that devastated large parts of Asia Minor, despite a Byzantine alliance with the Khazars, who launched attacks on the Caliphate's northern flank. Iconium and Caesarea were sacked, and Byzantine troops were again driven out of Armenia.

=== Beginning of Iconoclasm ===
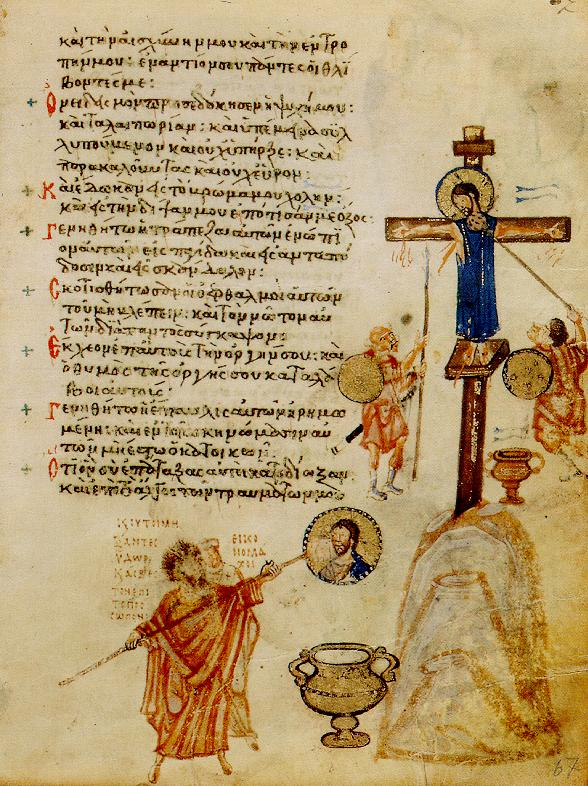
Folio from the 9th century iconophile Chludov Psalter, likening the iconoclasts, shown painting over an image of Christ, with the soldiers who crucified him

Leo's frustration at his military failures led him to believe, in the fashion of the time, that the Empire had lost divine favour. Already in 722 he had tried to force the conversion of the Empire's Jews, but soon he began to turn his attention to the veneration of icons, which some bishops had come to regard as idolatrous. Following the renewed eruption of Thera in 726, he published an edict condemning their use, and had the image of Christ removed from the Chalke Gate, the ceremonial entrance to the Great Palace of Constantinople. The Emperor showed himself increasingly critical of the iconophiles, and in a court council in 730 he formally banned depictions of religious figures.

Leo's espousal of iconoclasm caused reactions among both the populace and the Church. The soldiers that took down the image of Christ from the Chalke were lynched, and a thematic rebellion that broke out in Greece in 727, was at least in part motivated by iconophile fervour. The Patriarch Germanos I resigned, to be replaced by the more pliant Anastasios. The emperor's edict drew the condemnation of popes Gregory II and Gregory III, as well as John of Damascus. Generally however, the dispute remained limited, as Leo refrained from actively persecuting iconophiles.

The rift with the Papacy had other reasons as well: Leo transferred the dioceses of the eastern Illyricum (roughly the old Diocese of Macedonia) from Rome to the jurisdiction of Constantinople, and further deprived the Pope of the revenues of Sicily and Calabria. At the same time, Leo failed to provide aid to the embattled Byzantine Exarchate of Ravenna. In 727, the local Byzantine forces overthrew their commander, and in c. 738, the city was taken for a time by the Lombard king Liutprand.

=== Final years ===
The adoption of iconoclasm seemed indeed to be vindicated in the Emperor's eyes, for success returned to the Imperial arms, and the Muslims suffered a series of defeats between 727 and 732. The next years were more difficult, especially as the Arabs defeated the Khazars and forced their leader to convert to Islam. In 740 however the emperor and his son scored a decisive victory over an invading Arab army at Akroinon, which halted the momentum of the Arab attacks.

In March 741 (older sources prefer to date it to 726), Leo also promulgated the Ekloge ton nomon, a revised selection of laws, drawn chiefly from the older Codex Justinianus. Christian influence is evident in the marked decrease of crimes subject to capital punishment, but the collection conversely expanded the use of mutilation, perceived as more humane, as punishment. The Ekloge proved popular as a concise legal handbook, remaining the standard legal text until the introduction of the Epanagoge in the late 9th century, and was translated into Slavonic, Arabic and Armenian.

Leo died peacefully in his bed on 18 June 741, the first emperor to do so since Constantine IV. During his reign, he had succeeded in warding off the Arab attacks and consolidating the Empire's eastern frontier. On the other hand, his introduction of a new and unnecessary theological dispute, albeit for the moment relatively mild, compromised his efforts to restore stability to the Empire.

== Constantine V, 741–775 ==
Constantine was born in Constantinople, the son and successor of Emperor Leo III and Maria. In August 720 he was associated on the throne by his father, who had him marry Tzitzak, daughter of the Khazar khagan Bihar. His new bride was baptized as Irene (Eirēnē, "peace") in 732. Constantine V succeeded his father as sole emperor on April 19, 741.

=== Civil war against Artabasdos and first battles against veneration of images ===
Constantine was crossing Asia Minor to campaign against the Umayyad Caliphate under Hisham ibn Abd al-Malik on the eastern frontier in June 741 or 742. But during this course Constantine was attacked by the forces of his brother-in-law Artabasdos, the stratēgos of the Armeniac theme. Artabasdos was the husband of Anna, an older sister of Constantine.

Defeated, Constantine sought refuge in Amorion, while the victor advanced on Constantinople and was accepted as emperor. While Constantine now received the support of the Anatolic and Thracesian themes, Artabasdos secured that of the themes of Thrace and Opsikion, in addition to his own Armeniac soldiers.

After the rival emperors had bided their time in military preparations, Artabasdos marched against Constantine, but was defeated in May 743. Three months later Constantine defeated Artabasdos' son Niketas and headed for Constantinople. In early November Constantine was admitted into the capital and immediately turned on his opponents, having them blinded or executed. Perhaps because Artabasdos' usurpation was interconnected with the restoration of veneration of images, Constantine now became perhaps an even more fervent iconoclast than his father.

Constantine's derogatory epithet Kopronymos ("Dung-named": from kopros, "feces" or "animal dung"; and onoma, "name"), was applied to him by his avowed enemies over this extremely emotional issue, the iconodules. Using the obscene name they spread the rumour that, as an infant, he had defecated in his baptismal font, or the imperial purple cloth with which he was swaddled.

=== Campaign against icons ===
Constantine's position about iconoclasm was clear:

....He cannot be depicted. For what is depicted in one person, and he who circumscribes that person has plainly circumscribed the divine nature which is incapable of being circumscribed.

In February 754 Constantine convened a synod at Hieria, which was attended entirely by Iconoclast bishops. The council approved of Constantine's religious policy and secured the election of a new Iconoclast patriarch, but refused to follow in all of Constantine's views. The council confirmed the status of Mary as Theotokos, or Mother of God, reinforced the use of the terms "saint" and "holy" as meet, and condemned the desecration, burning, or looting of churches in the quest to quench Iconophiles.

It was followed by a campaign to remove images from the walls of churches and to purge the court and bureaucracy of Iconodules. Since monasteries tended to be strongholds of Iconophile sentiment, Constantine specifically targeted the monks, pairing them off and forcing them to marry nuns in the Hippodrome and expropriating monastic property for the benefit of the state or the army. The repressions against the monks (culminating in 766) were largely led by the emperor's general Michael Lachanodrakon, who threatened resistant monks with blinding and exile.

An iconodule abbot, Stephen Neos, was brutally lynched by a mob at the behest of the authorities. As a result, many monks fled to southern Italy and Sicily. By the end of Constantine's reign, Iconoclasm had gone as far as to brand relics and prayers to the saints as heretical.

Ultimately, iconophiles considered his death a divine punishment. In the 9th century, he was disinterred and his remains were thrown into the sea.

=== Campaigns against the Arabs and Bulgaria ===
Constantine was also an able general and administrator. He reorganised the themes, the military districts of the empire, and created new field army divisions called tagmata. This organization was intended to minimize the threat of conspiracies and to enhance the defensive capabilities of the Empire. With this reorganized army he embarked on campaigns on the three major frontiers.

In 746, profiting by the unstable conditions in the Umayyad Caliphate which was falling apart under Marwan II, Constantine invaded Syria and captured Germanikeia (modern Maraş, his father's birthplace). He organised the resettlement of part of the local Christian population to imperial territory in Thrace. In 747 his fleet destroyed the Arab fleet off Cyprus. In 752 Constantine led an invasion into the new Abbasid Caliphate under As-Saffah. Constantine captured Theodosioupolis and Melitene (Malatya), and again resettled some of the population in the Balkans. These campaigns failed to secure any concrete gains (apart from additional population employed to strengthen another frontier), but under Constantine V the Empire had gone on the offensive.

These successes made it possible to pursue an aggressive policy in the Balkans. With the resettlement of Christian populations from the East into Thrace, Constantine V aimed to enhance the prosperity and defence of this area which caused concern to the Empire's northern neighbour, Bulgaria and the two states clashed in 755. Kormisosh of Bulgaria raided as far as the Anastasian Wall, but was defeated in battle by Constantine V, who inaugurated a long series of nine successful campaigns against the Bulgarians in the next year, scoring a victory over Kormisosh's successor Vinekh at Marcellae.

Three year later he was defeated in the battle of the Rishki Pass but the Bulgarians did not exploit their success. In 763, he sailed to Anchialus with 800 ships carrying 9,600 cavalry and some infantry. Constantine's victories, including that at Anchialus in 763 caused considerable instability in Bulgaria, where six monarchs lost their crowns on account of their failures.

In 751, Lombard king Aistulf captured Ravenna, ending over two centuries of Byzantine rule, being the last Byzantine territorial holding to speak some sort of Latin, ending the continuation of the Western Roman Empire.

In 775, Constantine was persuaded to reveal to the Bulgarian ruler Telerig the identities of his agents in Bulgaria. These were promptly eliminated; thus, Constantine began preparations for a new campaign against the Bulgarians – during which he died on September 14, 775.

Constantine's campaigns were costly; during his reign the Byzantine Empire's annual revenues were reduced to about 1,800,000 nomismata due to his various wars and the Arab conquests.

== Leo IV, 775–780 ==
Leo was the son of Emperor Constantine V by his first wife, Tzitzak of Khazaria (known as Irene upon her conversion), the daughter of a Khagan of the Khazars (thought to be Bihar). Crowned co-emperor by his father in 751 Leo then married Irene, an Athenian from a noble family, in December 769. In 775 Constantine V died, leaving Leo as sole emperor.

On 24 April 776 Leo, following the precedent set by his father and grandfather, appointed his son, Constantine VI, co-emperor. This led to an uprising of Leo's five half-brothers, including Caesar Nikephoros, who had hoped to gain the throne themselves. The uprising was put down quickly, with the conspirators being beaten, tonsured, and exiled to Cherson under guard.

Leo IV was raised as an iconoclast under his father but was married to Irene, an iconodule. Realizing the division in his realm he pursued a path of conciliation towards the iconodules, previously declared heretical under imperial policy. Leo allowed monks, persecuted and deported under his father, to return to their monasteries, and he was anointed by some among the orthodox as “Friend to the Mother of God” for allowing monks to retain images of the Theotokos. In addition to the concessionary actions Leo also appointed an iconodule sympathizer, Paul of Cyprus, to the position of patriarch of Constantinople upon the death of the predecessor. At the end of his reign, Leo reversed his stance of toleration.

Leo's reign coincided with that of the third Abbasid Caliph, Al-Mahdi, who invaded Byzantine lands on successive occasions from 777 to 780 before ultimately being repulsed by Leo's armies, led by generals such as Michael Lachanodrakon. Leo himself set out with his army against the Bulgars but died of fever while on campaign. Leo's death on 8 September 780 resulted in the ascension of his wife, Irene, to the throne.

== Constantine VI and the regency of Irene, 780–797 ==
The only child of Emperor Leo IV and Irene, Constantine VI was crowned co-emperor by his father in 776. Leo's premature death in 780 left Constantine as sole emperor at the age of nine, with Irene serving as his regent.

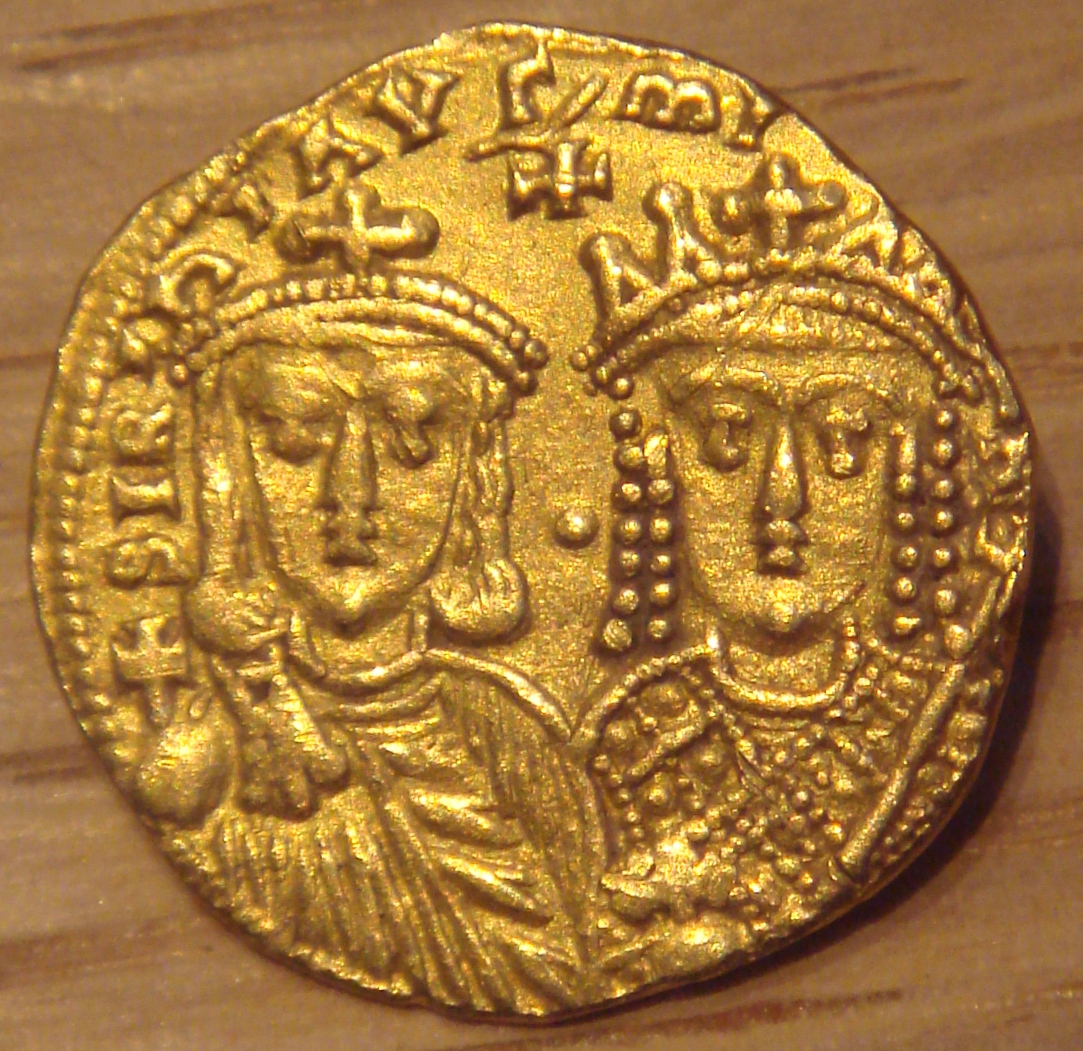
Gold solidus showing Irene alongside her son Constantine VI

In 782 he was betrothed to Rotrude, a daughter of the Frankish King Charlemagne by his third wife Hildegard. Irene herself broke off the engagement in 788. In 787 Constantine had signed the decrees of the Second Council of Nicaea, but he appears to have had iconoclast sympathies.

Upon turning sixteen, Constantine was eligible to rule independently. Irene remained an active participant in the government; after a conspiracy against her was suppressed in the spring of 790, she sought official recognition as empress. With military support from the Armeniacs, Constantine rebuffed his mother and entered upon a period of sole rule. In 792 he reversed his position, granting Irene the title of Empress and making her his official colleague.

The weakness of Constantine caused dissatisfaction among his supporters. He showed unheroic behaviour after the defeats at the hands of Kardam of Bulgaria in 791 and 792. A movement developed in favour of his uncle, the Caesar Nikephoros. Constantine had his uncle's eyes put out and the tongues of his father's four other half-brothers cut off. His former Armenian supporters revolted after he had blinded their general Alexios Mosele. He crushed this revolt with extreme cruelty in 793.

He then divorced his wife Maria of Amnia, who had failed to provide him with a male heir, and married his mistress Theodote, an unpopular and possibly illegal act, although the Patriarch ignored it. By his actions Constantine had lost all support, both of the ruling orthodox and the iconoclast opposition.

In 797 Constantine was captured and blinded by the supporters of his mother, who had organised a conspiracy. According to most contemporary accounts, he died from his wounds a few days later, leaving Irene to be crowned as first Empress regnant of Constantinople. Pretenders to the throne claiming to be Constantine VI later appeared during the reign of Michael II.

== Irene's sole rule and downfall, 797–802 ==
Although it is often claimed that, as monarch, Irene called herself "basileus" (βασιλεύς), 'emperor', rather than "basilissa" (βασίλισσα), 'empress', in fact there are only three instances where it is known that she used the title "basileus": two legal documents in which she signed herself as "Emperor of the Romans" and a gold coin of hers found in Sicily bearing the title of "basileus". In relation to the coin, the lettering is of poor quality and the attribution to Irene may, therefore, be problematic. In reality, she used the title "basilissa" in all other documents, coins and seals.

== Family tree of Isaurian/Syrian dynasty ==
Leo III emperor 717-741
Michael Melissenos general	(sister)	3.Eudokia	Constantine V 741-775 ∞ 1.Tzitzak ∞ 2.Maria	Anna ∞ Artabasdos rival emperor 741/2-743	Nikephoros I emperor 802-811; NIKEPHORIANS	Theophylact Rangabes admiral
Theodotus I Cassiteras; Patriarch	Theoktiste	Plato of Sakkoudion abbot	Anna	(3) Nikephoros caesar	(1) Leo IV emperor 775-780	Irene empress 797-802	Theophano of Athens (relative)	Staurakios emperor 803-811	Prokopia	Michael I Rangabes emperor 811-813
St. Theodore the Studite abbot	2.Theodote	Constantine VI emperor 780-797	1.Maria relative of St. Philaretos	Bardanes rebel	Stuarakios (II) co-emperor 811-813	Theophylact co-emperor 811-813	St. Ignatios; Patriarch
2.Euphrosyne	Michael II emperor 820-829	1.Thekla	1.Barka	Leo V emperor 813-820	2.Theodosia
AMORIANS

== Timeline ==
- Red denotes Senior Emperors
- Pink denotes Junior Emperors
- Orange denotes Caesars
- Yellow denotes Nobelissimoi
- Purple denotes Augustae

== See also ==
- Family tree of Byzantine emperors

== Sources ==
- Cheynet, Jean-Claude, ed. (2006), Le Monde Byzantin: Tome II, L'Empire byzantin 641–1204 (in French), Paris: Presses Universitaires de France, ISBN 978-2-13-052007-8
- Haldon, John F. (1990), Byzantium in the Seventh Century: The Transformation of a Culture, Cambridge University Press, ISBN 978-0-521-31917-1
- Haldon, John (1999). Warfare, State and Society in the Byzantine World, 565–1204. London: UCL Press. ISBN 1-85728-495-X.
- Kazhdan, Alexander, ed. (1991). The Oxford Dictionary of Byzantium. Oxford and New York: Oxford University Press. ISBN 0-19-504652-8.
- Lilie, Ralph-Johannes (1996), Byzanz unter Eirene und Konstantin VI. (780–802) (in German), Frankfurt am Main: Peter Lang, ISBN 3-631-30582-6
- Ostrogorsky, George (1997), History of the Byzantine State, Rutgers University Press, ISBN 978-0-8135-1198-6
- Rochow, Ilse (1994), Kaiser Konstantin V. (741–775). Materialien zu seinem Leben und Nachleben (in German), Frankfurt am Main: Peter Lang, ISBN 3-631-47138-6
- Runciman, Steven (1975), Byzantine civilisation, Taylor & Francis, ISBN 978-0-416-70380-1
- Treadgold, Warren (1988). The Byzantine Revival, 780–842. Stanford, California: Stanford University Press. ISBN 978-0-8047-1462-4.
- Treadgold, Warren (1997). A History of the Byzantine State and Society. Stanford, California: Stanford University Press. ISBN 0-8047-2630-2.
- Whittow, Mark (1996). The Making of Byzantium, 600–1025. Berkeley and Los Angeles, California: University of California Press. ISBN 978-0-520-20496-6.
