= Constantine V =

Byzantine emperor from 741 to 775

- Emperor of the Romans
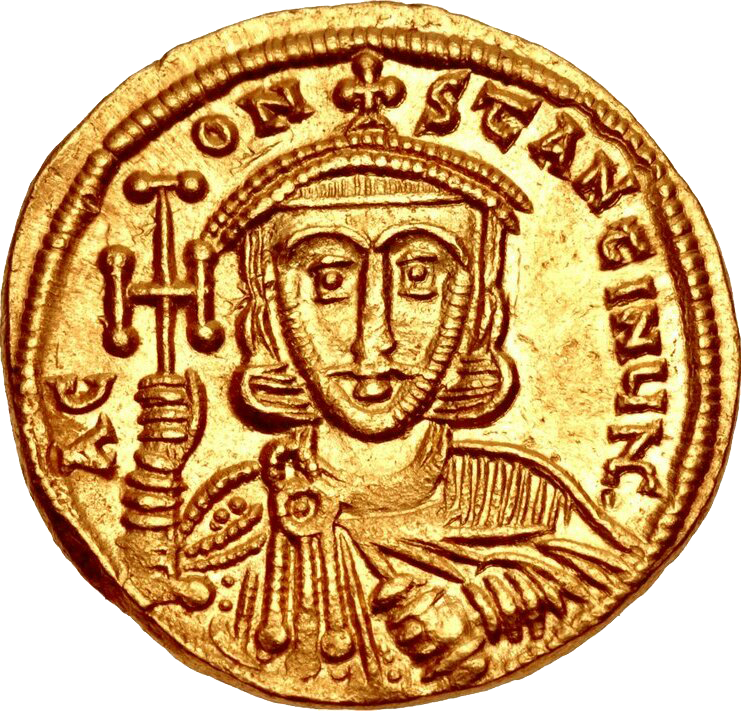
- Solidus of Constantine V

Byzantine emperor
- Reign: 18 June 741 – 14 September 775
- Coronation: 31 March 720
- Predecessor: Leo III the Isaurian
- Successor: Leo IV the Khazar
- Rival emperors: Artabasdos (741–743); Nikephoros (741–743)
- Born: July 718; Constantinople
- Died: 14 September 775 (aged 57)
- Wives: Tzitzak ("Irene of Khazaria"); Maria; Eudokia
- Issue: Leo IV; Nikephoros; Christopher; Niketas; Eudokimos; Anthimos; Anthousa
- Dynasty: Isaurian
- Father: Leo III the Isaurian
- Mother: Maria
- Religion: Chalcedonian Christianity

Constantine V (Greek: Κωνσταντῖνος, romanized: Kōnstantīnos; July 718 – 14 September 775) was Byzantine emperor from 741 to 775. His reign saw a consolidation of Byzantine security from external threats. As an able military leader, Constantine took advantage of civil war in the Muslim world to make limited offensives on the Arab frontier. With this eastern frontier secure, he undertook repeated campaigns against the Bulgars in the Balkans. His military activity, and policy of settling Christian populations from the Arab frontier in Thrace, made Byzantium's hold on its Balkan territories more secure. He was also responsible for important military and administrative innovations and reforms.

Religious strife and controversy was a prominent feature of his reign. His fervent support of iconoclasm and opposition to monasticism led to his vilification by some contemporary commentators and the majority of later Byzantine writers, who denigrated him with the nicknames "Dung-Named" (Ancient Greek: Κοπρώνυμος, romanized: Koprónymos), because he allegedly defaecated during his baptism, similarly "Anointed with Urine" (Ancient Greek: Οὐραλύφιος, romanized: Ouralýphios), and "the Equestrian" (Ancient Greek: Καβαλλίνος, romanized: Kaballinos), referencing the excrement of horses.

== Early life ==
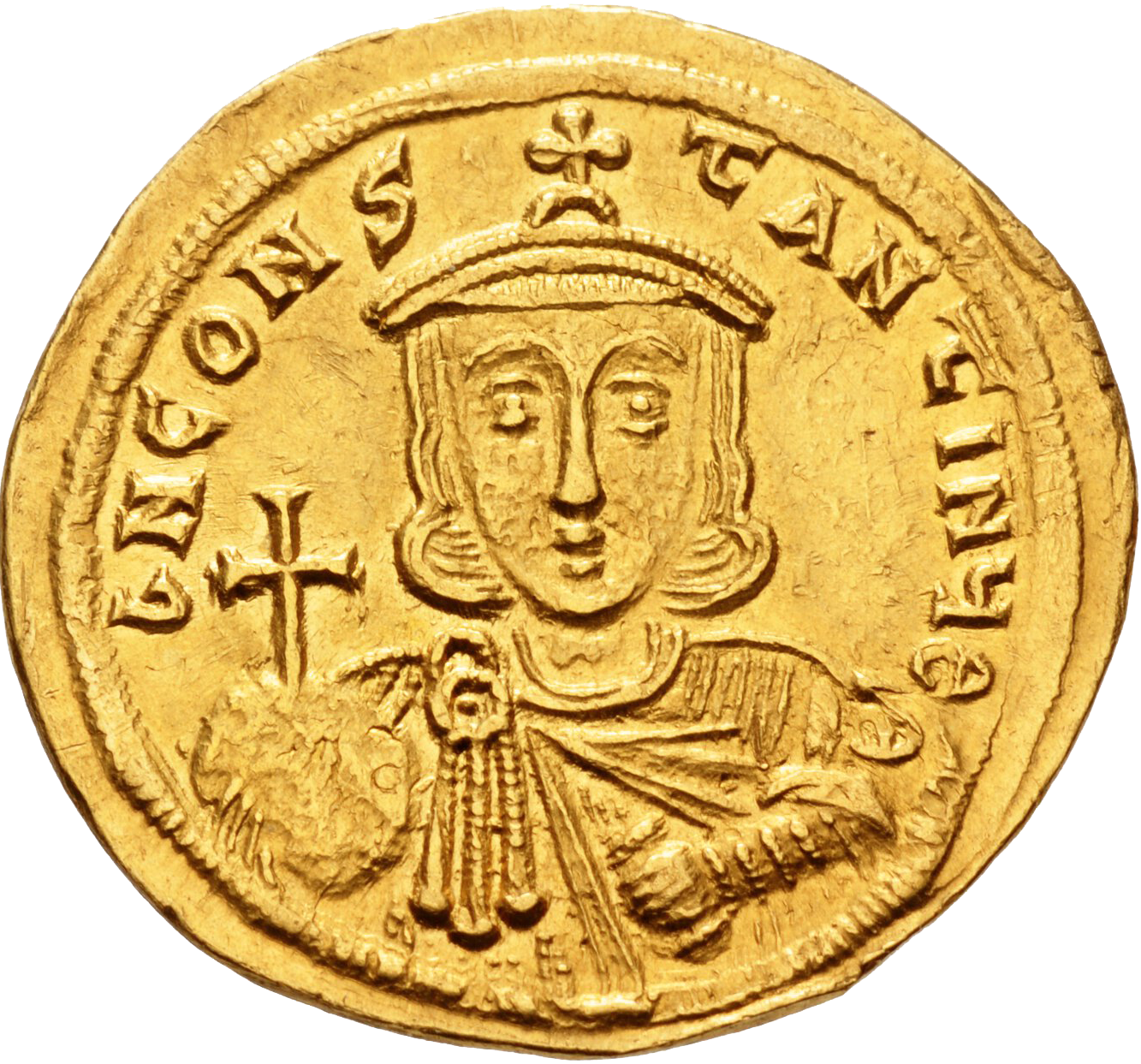
Constantine V as co-emperor, marked: dn constantinus

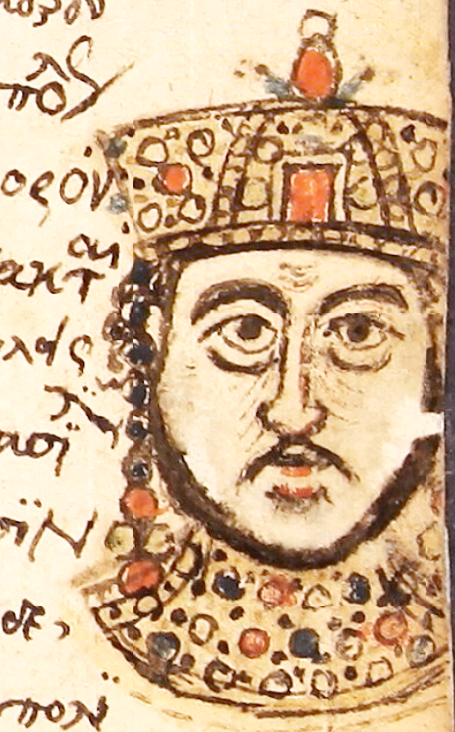
Constantine V in the 15th-century Mutinensis gr. 122

Constantine was born in Constantinople, the son and successor of Emperor Leo III and his wife Maria. In the Easter of 720, at two years of age, he was associated with his father on the throne, and crowned co-emperor by Patriarch Germanus I. In Byzantine political theory more than one emperor could share the throne; however, although all were accorded the same ceremonial status, only one emperor wielded ultimate power. As the position of emperor was in theory, and sometimes in practise, elective rather than strictly hereditary, a ruling emperor would often associate a son or other chosen successor with himself as a co-emperor to ensure the eventual succession. To celebrate the coronation of his son, Leo III introduced a new silver coin, the miliaresion; worth one-twelfth of a gold nomisma, it soon became an integral part of the Byzantine economy. In 726, Constantine's father issued the Ekloge ton nomon (Ecloga); a revised legal code, it was attributed to both father and son jointly. Constantine married Tzitzak, daughter of the Khazar khagan Bihar, an important Byzantine ally. His new bride was baptized Irene (Eirēnē, "peace") in 732. On his father's death, Constantine succeeded as sole emperor on 18 June 741.

Historical accounts of Constantine make reference to a chronic medical condition, possibly epilepsy or leprosy; early in his reign this may have been employed by those rebelling against him to question his fitness to be emperor.

== Reign ==
=== Rebellion of Artabasdos ===
Immediately after Constantine's accession in 741, his brother-in-law Artabasdos, husband of his older sister, Anna, rebelled. Artabasdos was the strategos (military governor) of the Opsikion theme (province) and had effective control of the Armeniac theme. The event is sometimes dated to 742, but this has been shown to be wrong.

Artabasdos struck against Constantine when their respective troops combined for an intended campaign against the Umayyad Caliphate; a trusted member of Constantine's retinue, called Beser, was killed in the attack. Constantine escaped and sought refuge in Amorion, where he was welcomed by the local soldiers, who had been commanded by Leo III before he became emperor. Meanwhile, Artabasdos advanced on Constantinople and, with the support of Theophanes Monutes (Constantine's regent) and Patriarch Anastasius, was acclaimed and crowned emperor. Constantine received the support of the Anatolic and Thracesian themes; Artabasdos secured the support of the theme of Thrace in addition to his own Opsikion and Armeniac soldiers.

The rival emperors bided their time making military preparations. Artabasdos marched against Constantine at Sardis in May 743 but was defeated. Three months later Constantine defeated Artabasdos' son Niketas and his Armeniac troops at Modrina and headed for Constantinople. In early November Constantine entered the capital, following a siege and a further battle. He immediately targeted his opponents, having many blinded or executed. Patriarch Anastasius was paraded on the back of an ass around the hippodrome to the jeers of the Constantinopolitan mob, though he was subsequently allowed to stay in office. Artabasdos, having fled the capital, was apprehended at the fortress of Pouzanes in Anatolia, probably located to the south of Nicomedia. Artabasdos and his sons were then publicly blinded and secured in the monastery of Chora on the outskirts of Constantinople.

=== Constantine's support of iconoclasm ===
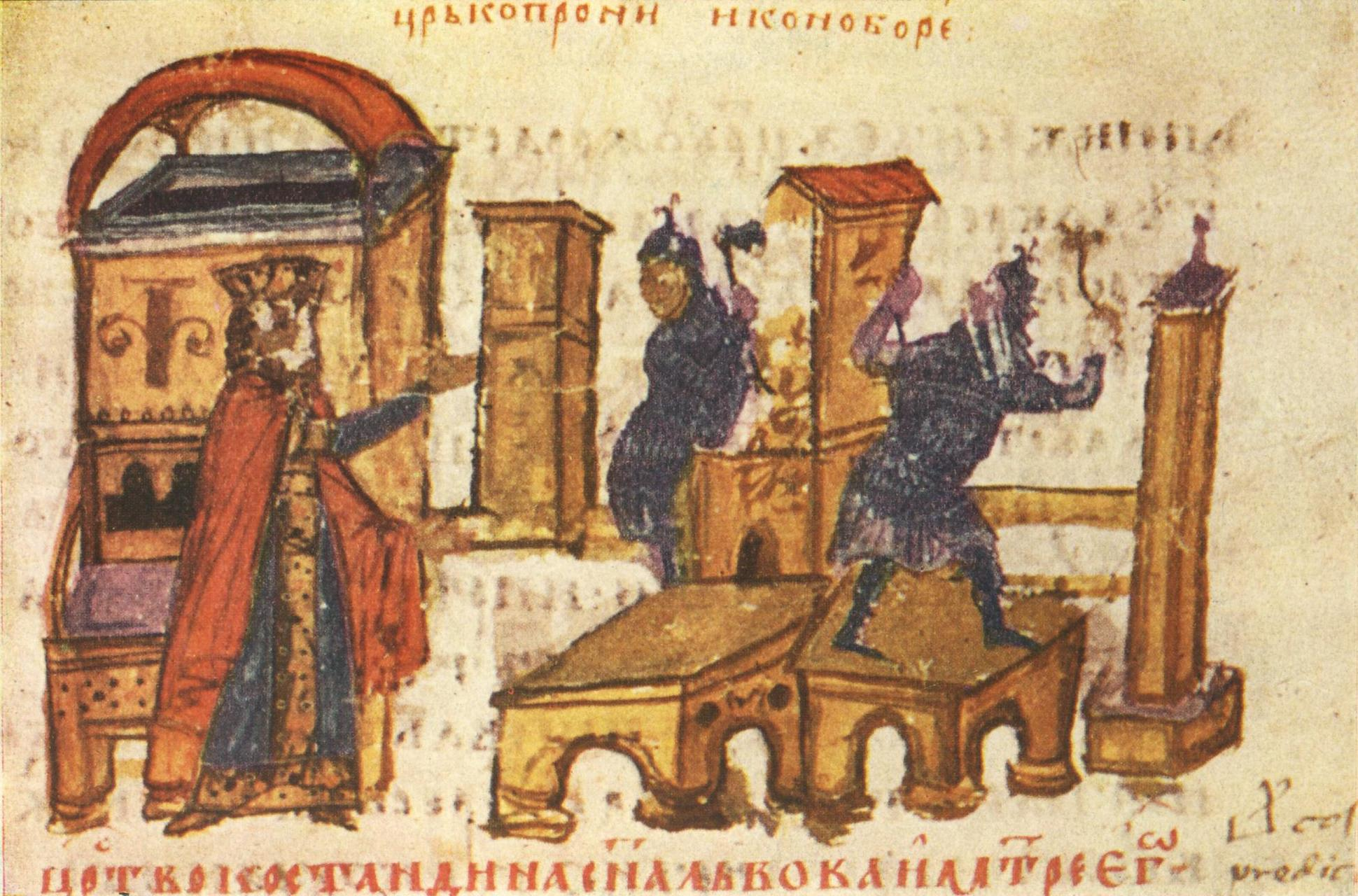
Soldiers deface or demolish an iconodule church on the orders of Constantine V (left), Manasses Chronicle, 14th-century Bulgarian manuscript

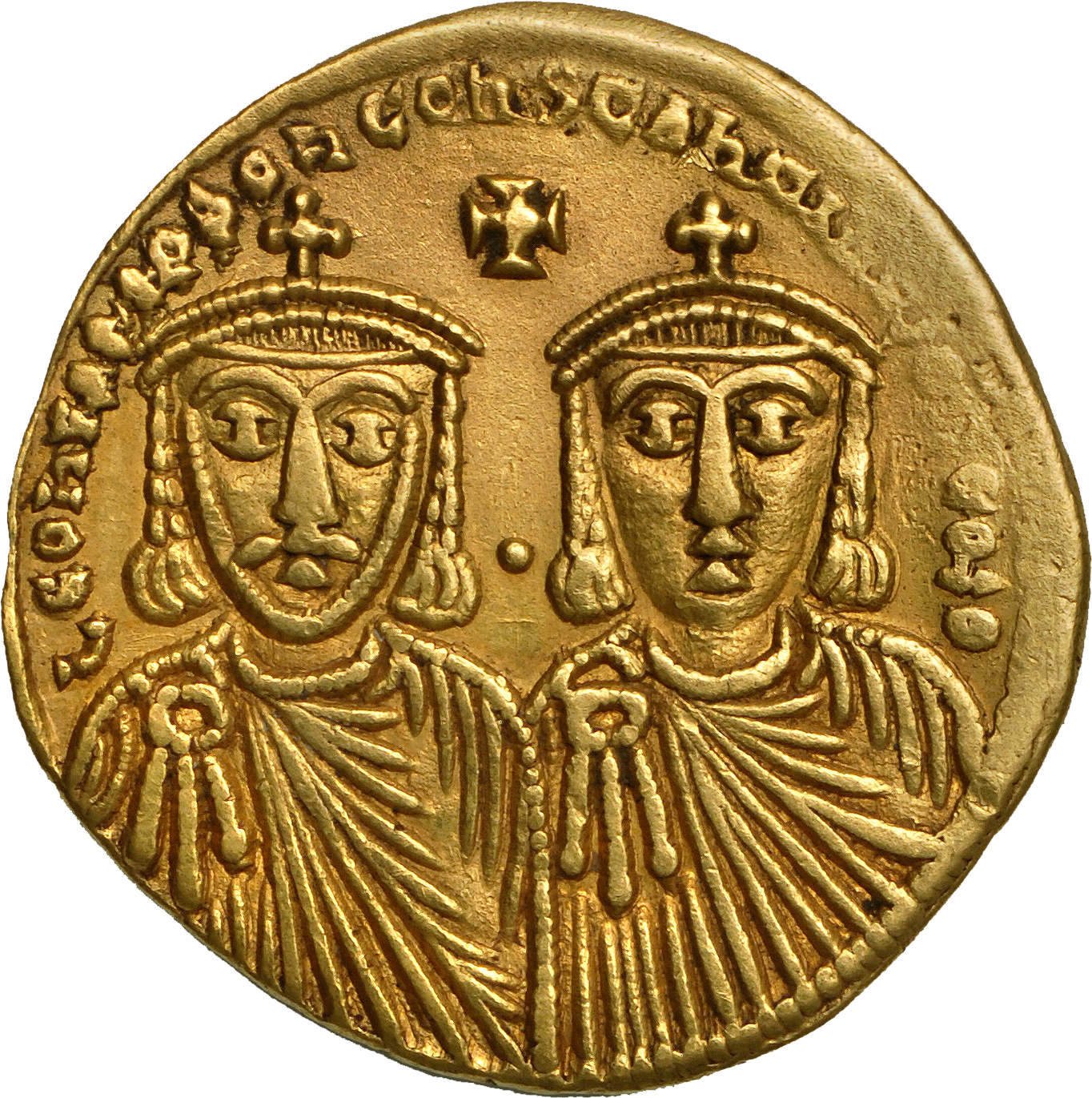
Constantine V (left) and his son and co-emperor Leo IV (right)

Like his father Leo III, Constantine supported iconoclasm, which was a theological movement that rejected the veneration of religious images and sought to destroy those in existence. Iconoclasm was later definitively classed as heretical. Constantine's avowed enemies in what was a bitter and long-lived religious dispute were the iconodules, who defended the veneration of images. Iconodule writers applied to Constantine the derogatory epithet Kopronymos ('dung-named', from kopros, meaning 'faeces' or 'animal dung', and onoma 'name'). Using this obscene name, they spread the rumour that as an infant he had defiled his own baptism by defaecating in the font, or on the imperial purple cloth with which he was swaddled.

Constantine questioned the legitimacy of any representation of God or Christ. The Church Father John of Damascus made use of the term 'uncircumscribable' in relation to the depiction of God. Constantine, relying on the linguistic connection between 'uncircumscribed' and 'incapable of being depicted', argued that the uncircumscribable cannot be legitimately depicted in an image. As Christian theology holds that Christ is God, he also cannot be represented in an image. The Emperor was personally active in the theological debate; evidence exists for him composing thirteen treatises, two of which survive in fragmentary form. He also presented his religious views at meetings organised throughout the empire, sending representatives to argue his case. In February 754, Constantine convened a council at Hieria, which was attended entirely by iconoclast bishops. The council agreed with Constantine's religious policy on images, declaring them anathema, and it secured the election of a new iconoclast patriarch. However, it refused to endorse all of Constantine's policies, which were influenced by the more extremist iconoclasts and were possibly critical of the veneration of Mary, mother of Jesus, and of the saints. The council confirmed the status of Mary as Theotokos (Θεοτόκος), or 'Mother of God', upheld the use of the terms "saint" and "holy" as legitimate, and condemned the desecration, burning, or looting of churches in the quest to suppress icon veneration.

The Council of Hieria was followed by a campaign to remove images from the walls of churches and to purge the court and bureaucracy of iconodules, however, the accounts of these events were written much later than they actually occurred, and by often vehemently anti-iconoclast sources, therefore their reliability is questionable. Since monasteries tended to be strongholds of iconophile sentiment and contributed little or nothing towards the secular needs of the state, Constantine specifically targeted these communities. He also expropriated monastic property for the benefit of the state or the army. These acts of repression against the monks were largely led by the Emperor's general Michael Lachanodrakon, who threatened resistant monks with blinding and exile. Constantine organised numerous pairs of monks and nuns to be paraded in the hippodrome, publicly ridiculing their vows of chastity. According to Theophanes the Confessor, the iconodule abbot Stephen the Younger, was beaten to death by a mob at the behest of the authorities. However even his c. 808–809 hagiography, the Life of St. Stephen the Younger, connects his execution more to treason against the Emperor, and indeed his punishments reflect those typically associated with an enemy of the state. Stephen was said to have trampled on a coin depicting the Emperor in order to provoke imperial retaliation and reveal the iconoclast hypocrisy of denying the force of sacred portraits but not of imperial portraits on coins. As a result of persecution, many monks fled to southern Italy and Sicily. The implacable resistance of iconodule monks and their supporters led to their propaganda reaching those close to the Emperor. On becoming aware of an iconodule-influenced conspiracy directed at himself, Constantine reacted uncompromisingly; in 765, eighteen high dignitaries charged with treason were paraded in the hippodrome, then variously executed, blinded or exiled. Patriarch Constantine II of Constantinople was implicated and deposed from office, and the following year he was tortured and beheaded.

According to later iconodule sources, for example Patriarch Nikephoros I of Constantinople's Second Antirrheticus and treatise Against Constantinus Caballinus, Constantine's iconoclasm had gone as far as to brand prayers to Mary and saints as heretical, or at least highly questionable. However, the extent of coherent official campaigns to forcibly destroy or cover up religious images or the existence of widespread government-sanctioned destruction of relics has been questioned by more recent scholarship. There is no evidence, for example, that Constantine formally banned the cult of saints. Pre-iconoclastic religious images did survive, and various existing accounts record that icons were preserved by being hidden. In general, the culture of pictorial religious representation appears to have survived the iconoclast period largely intact. The extent and severity of iconoclastic destruction of images and relics was exaggerated in later iconodule writings.

Scholars generally take the anathemas in the Council of Hieria condemning the one who "does not ask for [the prayers of Mary and the saints] as having the freedom to intercede on behalf of the world according to the tradition of the church", as proof that Constantine never rejected the intercession of Mary and the saints, since they consider it inconceivable for an emperor to contradict the decisions of a council he convened. Moreover, the positive evidence that he rejected intercession is regarded as unreliable due to the iconodule motivation of its authors. Dissenting scholars point to the wealth of evidence, not only from Patriarch Nikephoros but from Theophanes and Patriarch Methodios I of Constantinople (c. 788 – 847), who in his Life of Theophanes defends the intercession of saints, perpetuating a centuries-long controversy regarding the doctrine of soul-sleep, which if true would mean dead saints are incapable of intercession. They allege that it is conceivable that, although the moderate iconoclast party won at Hieria, which still affirmed the intercession of the saints, the radical iconoclasts who denied it briefly triumphed afterwards, with Constantine publicly interfering with religious practice by removing intercessory prayers to saints from church hymns and hagiographies, as described by the iconodule primary sources.

Iconodules considered Constantine's death a divine punishment. In the 9th century, following the ultimate triumph of the iconodules, Constantine's remains were removed from the imperial sepulchre in the Church of the Holy Apostles.

=== Domestic policies and administration ===
Themes of Byzantine Asia Minor and the Arab–Byzantine frontier zone in the late 8th century, following the provincial reforms of Constantine V (the border of imperial Thrace does not reflect that Philippopolis was a Byzantine city)

Assiduous in courting popularity, Constantine consciously employed the hippodrome, scene of the ever-popular chariot races, to influence the populace of Constantinople. In this he made use of the 'circus factions', which controlled the competing teams of charioteers and their supporters, had widespread social influence, and could mobilise large numbers of the citizenry. The hippodrome became the setting of rituals of humiliation for war captives and political enemies, in which the mob took delight. Constantine's sources of support were the people and the army, and he used them against his iconodule opponents in the monasteries and in the bureaucracy of the capital. Iconoclasm was not purely an imperial religious conviction, it also had considerable popular support: some of Constantine's actions against the iconodules may have been motivated by a desire to retain the approval of the people and the army. The monasteries were exempt from taxation and monks from service in the army; the Emperor's antipathy towards them may have derived to a greater extent from secular, fiscal and manpower, considerations than from a reaction to their theology.

Constantine carried forward the administrative and fiscal reforms initiated by his father Leo III. The military governors (στρατηγοί, stratēgoi) were powerful figures, whose access to the resources of their extensive provinces often provided the means of rebellion. The Opsikion theme had been the power-base that enabled the rebellion of Artabasdos, and was also the theme situated nearest to the capital within Asia Minor. Constantine reduced the size of this theme, dividing from it the Bucellarian and, perhaps, the Optimaton themes. In those provinces closest to the seat of government this measure increased the number of stratēgoi and diminished the resources available to any single one, making rebellion less easy to accomplish.

Constantine was responsible for the creation of a small central army of fully professional soldiers, the imperial tagmata ('the regiments'). He achieved this by training for serious warfare a corps of largely ceremonial guards units that were attached to the imperial palace, and expanding their numbers. This force was designed to form the core of field armies and was composed of better-drilled, better-paid, and better-equipped soldiers than were found in the provincial themata units, whose troops were part-time soldier-farmers. Before their expansion, the vestigial Scholae and the other guards units presumably contained few useful soldiers, therefore Constantine must have incorporated former thematic soldiers into his new formation. Being largely based at or near the capital, the tagmata were under the immediate control of the Emperor and were free of the regional loyalties that had been behind so many military rebellions.

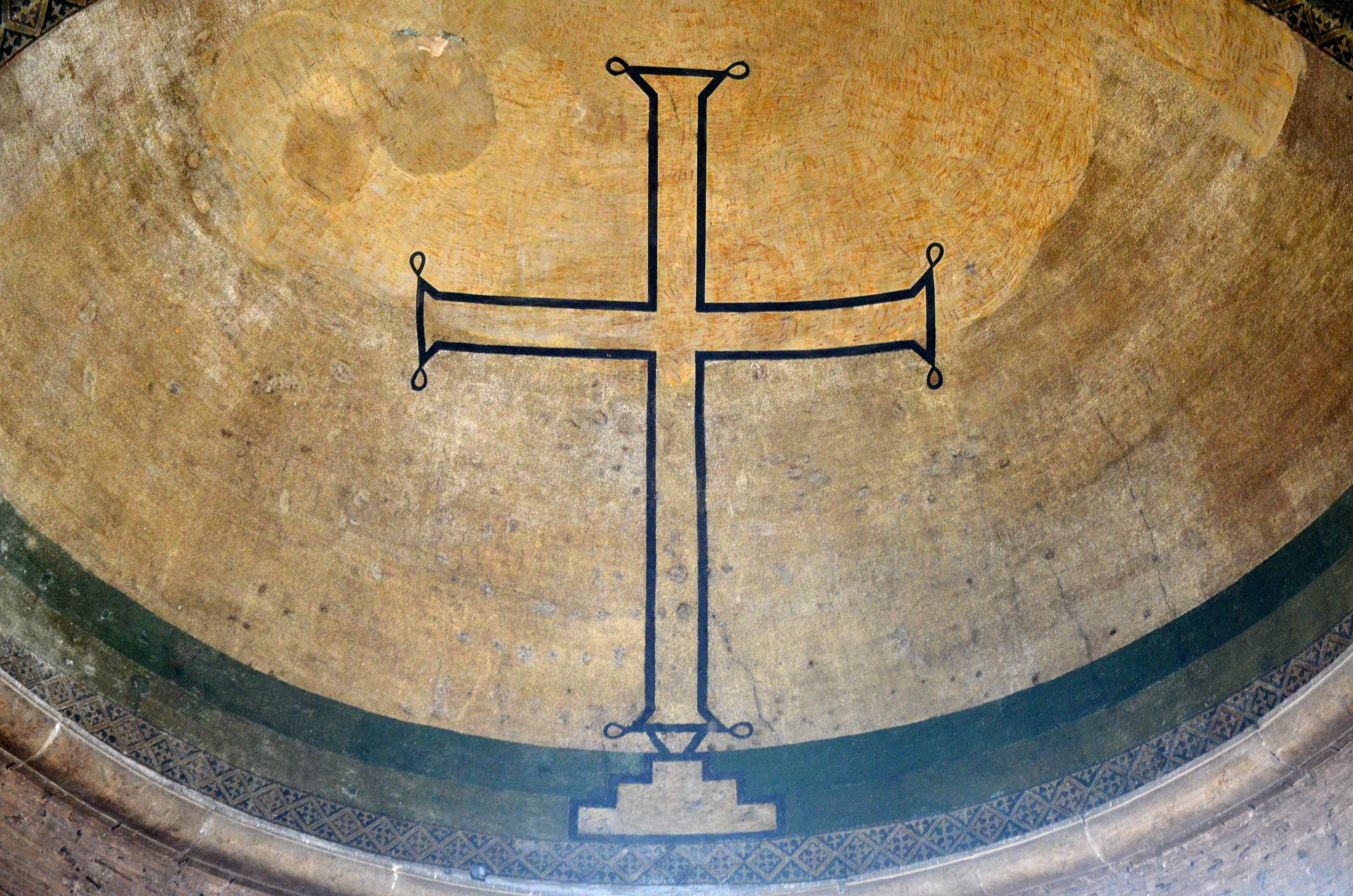
A mosaic cross in the apse of the Hagia Irene church in Istanbul. It is one of the few artistic remains of iconoclasm. Created during the reign of Constantine it occupies the semi-dome of the apse usually reserved for a devotional image, often a depiction of Christ Pantocrator or the Theotokos.

The fiscal administration of Constantine was highly competent. This drew from his enemies accusations of being a merciless and rapacious extractor of taxes and an oppressor of the rural population. However, the empire was prosperous and Constantine left a very well-stocked treasury for his successor. The area of cultivated land within the Empire was extended and food became cheaper; between 718 and c. 800 the corn (wheat) production of Thrace trebled. Constantine's court was opulent, with splendid buildings, and he consciously promoted the patronage of secular art to replace the religious art that he removed.

Constantine constructed a number of notable buildings in the Great Palace of Constantinople, including the Church of the Virgin of the Pharos and the porphyra. The porphyra was a chamber lined with porphyry, a stone of imperial purple colour. In it expectant empresses underwent the final stages of labour and it was the birthplace of the children of reigning emperors. Constantine's son Leo was the first child born here, and thereby obtained the title porphyrogénnētos (born in the purple) the ultimate accolade of legitimacy for an imperial prince or princess. The concept of a 'purple birth' predated the construction of the chamber, but it gained a literal aspect from the chamber's existence. The porphyry was reputed to have come from Rome and represented a direct link to the ancient origins of Byzantine imperial authority. Constantine also rebuilt the prominent church of Hagia Eirene in Constantinople, which had been badly damaged by the earthquake that hit Constantinople in 740. The building preserves rare examples of iconoclastic church decoration.

With the impetus of having fathered numerous offspring, Constantine codified the court titles given to members of the imperial family. He associated only his eldest son, Leo, with the throne as co-emperor (in 751), but gave his younger sons the titles of caesar for the more senior in age and nobelissimos for the more junior.

=== Campaigns against the Arabs ===
In 746, profiting by the unstable conditions in the Umayyad Caliphate, which was falling apart under Marwan II, Constantine invaded Syria, captured Germanikeia (his father's birthplace) and recaptured the island of Cyprus. He organised the resettlement of part of the local Christian population to imperial territory in Thrace, strengthening the empire's control of this region. In 747 his fleet destroyed the Arab fleet off Cyprus. The same year saw a serious outbreak of plague in Constantinople, which caused a pause in Byzantine military operations. Constantine retired to Bithynia to avoid the disease and, after it had run its course, resettled people from mainland Greece and the Aegean islands in Constantinople to replace those who had perished.

In 751 he led an invasion into the new Abbasid Caliphate under As-Saffah. Constantine captured Theodosiopolis and Melitene, which he demolished, and again resettled some of the population in the Balkans. The eastern campaigns failed to secure concrete territorial gains, as there was no serious attempt to retain control of the captured cities, except Camachum (modern Kemah), which was garrisoned. However, under Constantine the Empire had gone on the offensive against the Arabs after over a century of largely defensive warfare. Constantine's major goal in his eastern campaigns seems to have been to forcibly gather up local Christian populations from beyond his borders in order to resettle Thrace. Additionally, the deliberate depopulation of the region beyond the eastern borders created a no-man's land where the concentration and provisioning of Arab armies was made more difficult. This in turn increased the security of Byzantine Anatolia. His military reputation was such that, in 757, the mere rumour of his presence caused an Arab army to retreat. In the same year he agreed a truce and an exchange of prisoners with the Arabs, freeing his army for offensive campaigning in the Balkans.

=== Events in Italy ===
With Constantine militarily occupied elsewhere, and the continuance of imperial influence in the West being given a low priority, the Lombard king Aistulf captured Ravenna in 755, ending over two centuries of Byzantine rule in central Italy. The lack of interest Constantine showed in Italian affairs had profound and lasting consequences. Pope Stephen II, seeking protection from the aggression of the Lombards, appealed in person to the Frankish king Pepin the Short. Pepin cowed Aistulf and restored Stephen to Rome at the head of an army. This began the Frankish involvement in Italy that eventually established Pepin's son Charlemagne as Holy Roman Emperor, and also instigated papal temporal rule in Italy with the creation of the Papal States.

Constantine sent a number of unsuccessful embassies to the Lombards, Franks and the papacy to demand the restoration of Ravenna, but never attempted a military reconquest or intervention.

=== Repeated campaigns against the Bulgarians ===
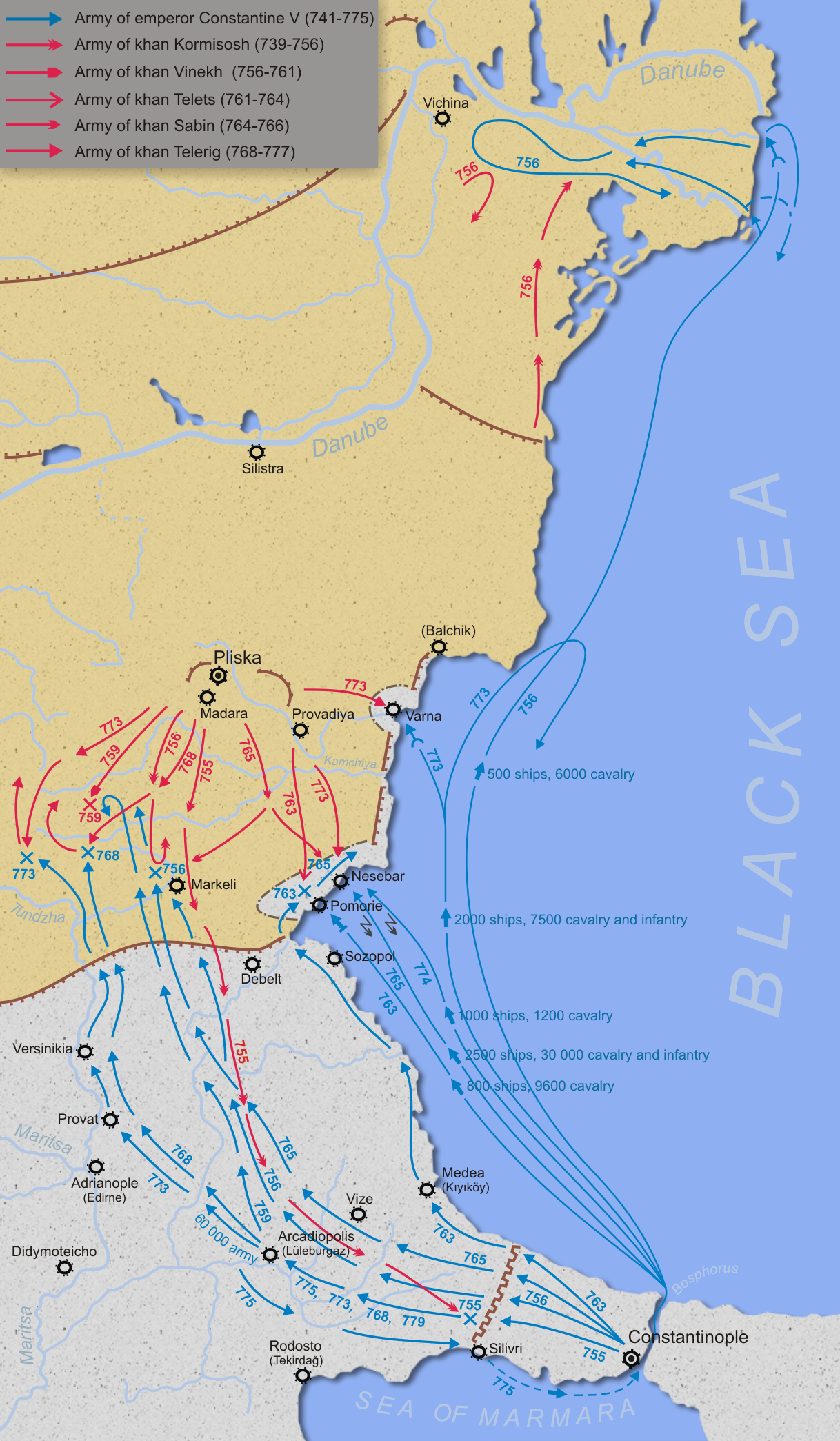
Byzantine and Bulgarian campaigns during the reign of Constantine (741–775)

The successes in the east made it possible to then pursue an aggressive policy in the Balkans. Constantine aimed to enhance the prosperity and defence of Thrace by the resettlement there of Christian populations transplanted from the east. This influx of settlers, allied to an active re-fortification of the border, caused concern to the Empire's northern neighbour, Bulgaria, leading the two states to clash in 755. Kormisosh of Bulgaria raided as far as the Anastasian Wall (the outermost defence of the approaches to Constantinople) but was defeated in battle by Constantine, who inaugurated a series of nine successful campaigns against the Bulgarians in the next year, scoring a victory over Kormisosh's successor Vinekh at Marcellae. In 759, Constantine was defeated in the Battle of the Rishki Pass, but the Bulgarians were not able to exploit their success.

Constantine campaigned against the Slav tribes of Thrace and Macedonia in 762, deporting some tribes to the Opsician theme in Anatolia, though some voluntarily requested relocation away from the troubled Bulgarian border region. A contemporary Byzantine source reported that 208,000 Slavs emigrated from Bulgarian controlled areas into Byzantine territory and were settled in Anatolia.

A year later he sailed to Anchialus with 800 ships carrying 9,600 cavalry and some infantry, gaining a victory over Khan Telets. Many Bulgar nobles were captured in the battle, and were later slaughtered outside the Golden Gate of Constantinople by the circus factions. Telets was assassinated in the aftermath of his defeat. In 765 the Byzantines again successfully invaded Bulgaria, during this campaign both Constantine's candidate for the Bulgarian throne, Toktu, and his opponent, Pagan, were killed. Pagan was killed by his own slaves when he sought to evade his Bulgarian enemies by fleeing to Varna, where he wished to defect to the Emperor. The cumulative effect of Constantine's repeated offensive campaigns and numerous victories caused considerable instability in Bulgaria, where six monarchs lost their crowns due to their failures in war against Byzantium.

In 775, the Bulgarian ruler Telerig contacted Constantine to ask for sanctuary, saying that he feared that he would have to flee Bulgaria. Telerig enquired as to whom he could trust within Bulgaria, and Constantine foolishly revealed the identities of his agents in the country. The named Byzantine agents were then promptly eliminated. In response, Constantine set out on a new campaign against the Bulgarians, during which he developed carbuncles on his legs. He died during his return journey to Constantinople, on 14 September 775. Though Constantine was unable to destroy the Bulgar state, or impose a lasting peace, he restored imperial prestige in the Balkans.

== Assessment and legacy ==
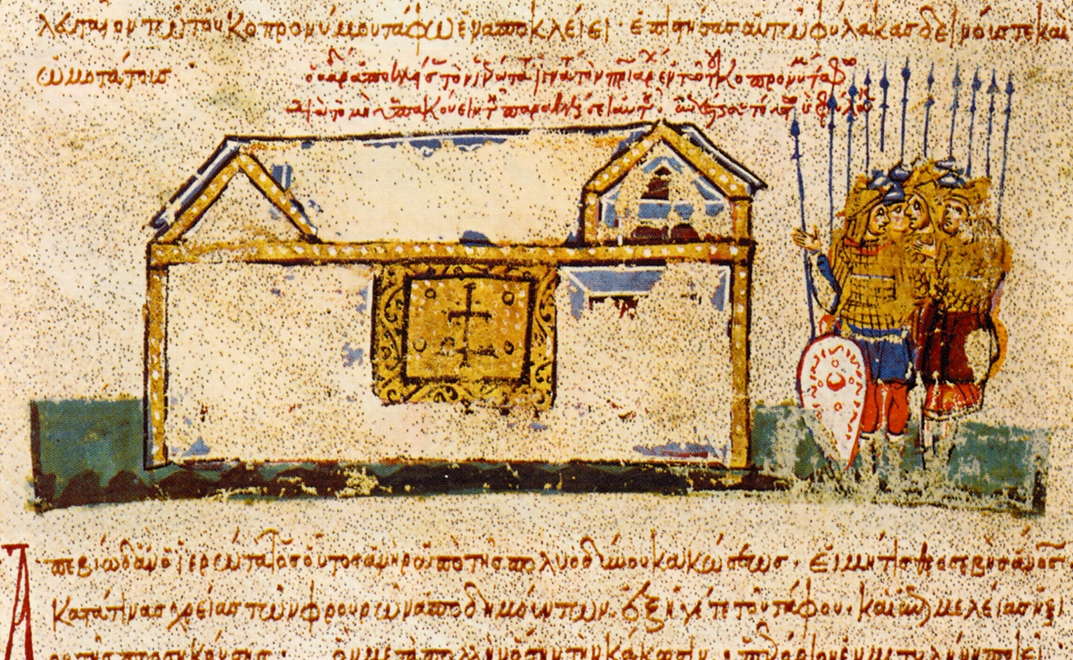
Soldiers at the tomb of Constantine V, Skylitzes Chronicle

Constantine V was a highly capable ruler, continuing the reforms – fiscal, administrative and military – of his father. He was also a successful general, not only consolidating the empire's borders, but actively campaigning beyond those borders, both east and west. At the end of his reign the empire had strong finances, a capable army that was proud of its successes and a church that appeared to be subservient to the political establishment.

In concentrating on the security of the empire's core territories he tacitly abandoned some peripheral regions, notably in Italy, which were lost. However, the hostile reaction of the Roman Church and the Italian people to iconoclasm had probably doomed imperial influence in central Italy, regardless of any possible military intervention. Due to his espousal of iconoclasm Constantine was damned in the eyes of contemporary iconodule writers and subsequent generations of Orthodox historians. Typical of this demonisation are the descriptions of Constantine in the writings of Theophanes the Confessor: "a monster athirst for blood", "a ferocious beast", "unclean and bloodstained magician taking pleasure in evoking demons", "a precursor of Antichrist". However, to his army and people he was "the victorious and prophetic Emperor". Following a disastrous defeat of the Byzantines by the Bulgarian Khan Krum in 811 at the Battle of Pliska, troops of the tagmata broke into Constantine's tomb and implored the dead emperor to lead them once more. The life and actions of Constantine, if freed from the distortion caused by the adulation of his soldiers and the demonisation of iconodule writers, show that he was an effective administrator and gifted general, but he was also autocratic, uncompromising and sometimes needlessly harsh.

All surviving contemporary and later Byzantine histories covering the reign of Constantine were written by iconodules. As a result of this, they are open to suspicion of bias and inaccuracy, particularly when attributing motives to the Emperor, his supporters and opponents. This makes any claims of absolute certainty regarding Constantine's policies and the extent of his repression of iconodules unreliable. In particular, a manuscript written in north-eastern Anatolia concerning miracles attributed to St. Theodore is one of few probably written during or just after the reign of Constantine to survive in its original form; it contains little of the extreme invective common to later iconodule writings. In contrast, the author indicates that iconodules had to make accommodations with imperial iconoclastic policies, and even bestows on Constantine V the conventional religious acclamations: 'Guarded by God' (θεοφύλακτος) and 'Christ-loving emperor' (φιλόχριστος βασιλεὺς).

== Family ==
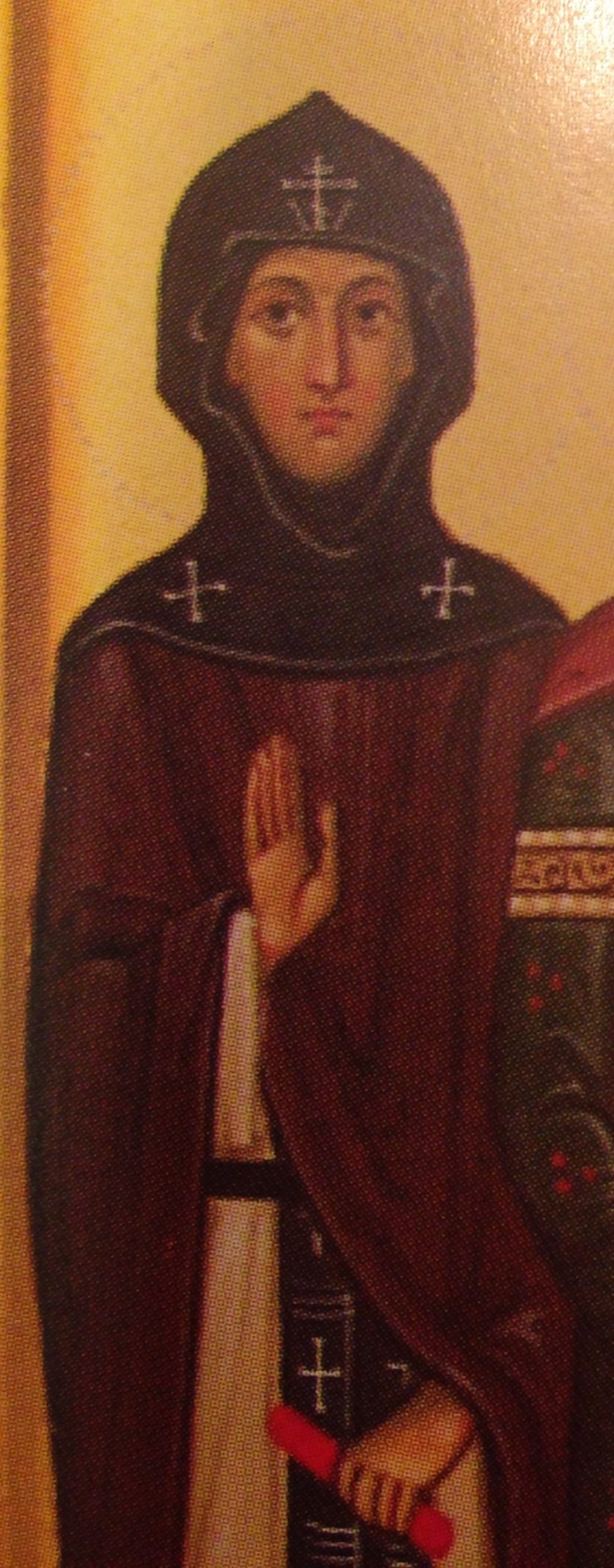
Icon of St. Anthousa, daughter of Constantine V

By his first wife, Tzitzak ("Irene of Khazaria"), Constantine V had one son:

- Leo IV, who succeeded as emperor. He was crowned in 751.

By his second wife, Maria, Constantine V is not known to have had children.

By his third wife, Eudokia, Constantine V had five sons and a daughter:

- Christopher, caesar
- Nikephoros, caesar
- Niketas, nobelissimos
- Eudokimos, nobelissimos
- Anthimos, nobelissimos
- Anthousa (an iconodule), after her father's death she became a nun, she was later venerated as Saint Anthousa the Younger

== See also ==
- List of Byzantine emperors

== Sources ==
- Angold, M. (2012) Byzantium: The Bridge from Antiquity to the Middle Ages, Hachette UK, London ISBN 978-0312284299
- Barnard, L. (1977) "The Theology of Images", in Iconoclasm, Bryer, A. and Herrin, J. (eds.), Centre for Byzantine Studies University of Birmingham, pp. 7–13 ISBN 0704402262
- Bonner, M. D. (2004) Arab-Byzantine Relations in Early Islamic Times, Ashgate/Variorum, Farnham ISBN 978-0860787167
- Brubaker, L. and Haldon, J. (2011) Byzantium in the Iconoclast Era, C. 680–850: A History, Cambridge University Press, ISBN 978-0521430937
- Bury, J. B. (1923) The Cambridge Medieval History, Vol. 4: The Eastern Roman Empire, Cambridge University Press, ISBN 978-1456581633
- Constas, N. (trans.) (1998) "Life of St. Anthousa, Daughter of Constantine V", in Byzantine Defenders of Images: Eight Saints' Lives in English Translation, Talbot, A-M. M. (ed.), Dumbarton Oaks, Harvard University Press, Cambridge MA pp. 21–24 ISBN 978-0884022596
- Curta, Florin (2006). Southeastern Europe in the Middle Ages, 500–1250. Cambridge: Cambridge University Press. ISBN 978-0-521-81539-0.
- Dagron, G. (2003) Emperor and Priest: The Imperial Office in Byzantium, Cambridge University Press, ISBN 978-0521036979
- Fine, John V. A. Jr. (1991) [1983]. The Early Medieval Balkans: A Critical Survey from the Sixth to the Late Twelfth Century. Ann Arbor: University of Michigan Press. ISBN 0-472-08149-7.
- Finlay, G. (1906) History of the Byzantine Empire from 716 to 1057, J. M. Dent & Sons, London (Reprint 2010 – Kessinger, Whitefish Montana ISBN 978-1165515721). First published in 1864 as Greece, A History of, From Its Conquest by the Romans to the Present Time: 146 B.C. – 1864 A.D. (Final revised ed. 7 vols., 1877)
- Freely, J. and Cakmak, A. (2004). Byzantine Monuments of Istanbul. Cambridge University Press, ISBN 978-0521772570
- Garland, L. (1999) Byzantine Empresses: Women and Power in Byzantium AD 527–1204, Routledge, London ISBN 0415146887
- Haldon, John (1999). Warfare, State and Society in the Byzantine World, 565–1204. London: UCL Press. ISBN 1-85728-495-X.
- Herrin, J. (2007) Byzantium: The Surprising Life of a Medieval Empire, Princeton University Press, ISBN 978-0691143699 JSTOR
- Jeffreys, E., Haldon, J.F. and Cormack, R. (eds.) (2008) The Oxford Handbook of Byzantine Studies, Oxford University Press, ISBN 978-0199252466
- Jenkins, R. J. H. (1966) Byzantium: The Imperial Centuries, AD 610–1071, Weidenfeld & Nicolson, London ISBN 978-1299745629
- Krausmüller, Dirk (2015). "Contextualizing Constantine V's radical religious policies: the debate about the intercession of the saints and the 'sleep of the soul' in the Chalcedonian and Nestorian churches". Byzantine and Modern Greek Studies. 39 (1): 25–49. doi:10.1179/0307013114Z.00000000051.
- Loos, M. (1974) Dualist Heresy in the Middle Ages, Martinus Nijhoff NV, The Hague ISBN 902471673X
- Magdalino, Paul (2002) [1993]. The Empire of Manuel I Komnenos, 1143–1180 (Second ed.). Cambridge: Cambridge University Press. ISBN 9780521526531.
- Magdalino, P. (2015) "The People and the Palace", in The Emperor's House: Palaces from Augustus to the Age of Absolutism, Featherstone, M., Spieser, J-M., Tanman, G. and Wulf-Rheidt, U. (eds.), Walter de Gruyter, Göttingen ISBN 978-3110331769
- Nikephoros (1990). Short history. Translated by Cyril Mango. Dumbarton Oaks. ISBN 0-88402-184-X.
- Ostrogorsky, G. (1980) History of the Byzantine State, Basil Blackwell, Oxford ISBN 978-0631127826
- Pelikan, J. (1977) The Christian Tradition: A History of the Development of Doctrine, Volume 2: The Spirit of Eastern Christendom (600–1700), University of Chicago Press, Chicago ISBN 9780226653730
- Robertson, A. (2017) "The Orient Express: Abbot John's Rapid trip from Constantinople to Ravenna c. AD 700", in Byzantine Culture in Translation, Brown, B. and Neil, B. (eds.), Brill, Leiden ISBN 978-9004348868
- Rochow, I. (1994) Kaiser Konstantin V. (741–775). Materialien zu seinem Leben und Nachleben (in German), Peter Lang, Frankfurt am Main, Germany ISBN 3631471386
- Theophanes the Confessor (1997). The Chronicle of Theophanes Confessor. Translated by Cyril Mango; Roger Scott. Oxford University Press. ISBN 0-19-822568-7.
- Treadgold, W. T. (1995) Byzantium and Its Army, Stanford University Press, Stanford, California ISBN 0804731632
- Treadgold, Warren (1997). A History of the Byzantine State and Society. Stanford, California: Stanford University Press. ISBN 0-8047-2630-2.
- Treadgold, W. T. (2012) "Opposition to Iconoclasm as Grounds for Civil War", in Byzantine War Ideology Between Roman Imperial Concept And Christian Religion, Koder, J. and Stouratis, I. (eds.), Austrian Academy of Sciences Press, Vienna ISBN 978-3700173076 JSTOR
- Zuckerman, C. (1988) The Reign of Constantine V in the Miracles of St. Theodore the Recruit, Revue des Études Byzantines, tome 46, pp. 191–210, Institut Français D'Études Byzantines, Paris, ISSN 0766-5598 doi:10.3406/rebyz.1988.2230

== Literature ==
- The Oxford Dictionary of Byzantium, Oxford University Press, 1991.
- Martindale, John et al, (2001). Prosopography of the Byzantine Empire (641-867). [Online edition http://www.pbe.kcl.ac.uk]
- Nicol, Donald M. (1993) [1972]. The Last Centuries of Byzantium, 1261–1453 (Second ed.). Cambridge: Cambridge University Press. ISBN 978-0-521-43991-6.

Constantine V Isaurian dynasty Born: 718 Died: 14 September 775
Regnal titles
Preceded by Leo III	Byzantine emperor 18 June 741 – 14 September 775	Succeeded by Leo IV
Political offices
Vacant Title last held by Leo III	Roman consul 742	Vacant Title next held by Leo IV
