= Maria (wife of Leo III) =

Maria I
- Augusta

Empress of the Byzantine Empire
- Tenure: 717–741
- Born: 7th century
- Died: 8th century
- Spouse: Leo III the Isaurian
- Issue: Anna; Constantine V Irene; Kosmo
Names
- Maria (Μαρία)
- Dynasty: Isaurian Dynasty

Maria I (Greek: Μαρία; died after 718) was the empress consort of Leo III the Isaurian of the Byzantine Empire.

== Empress ==
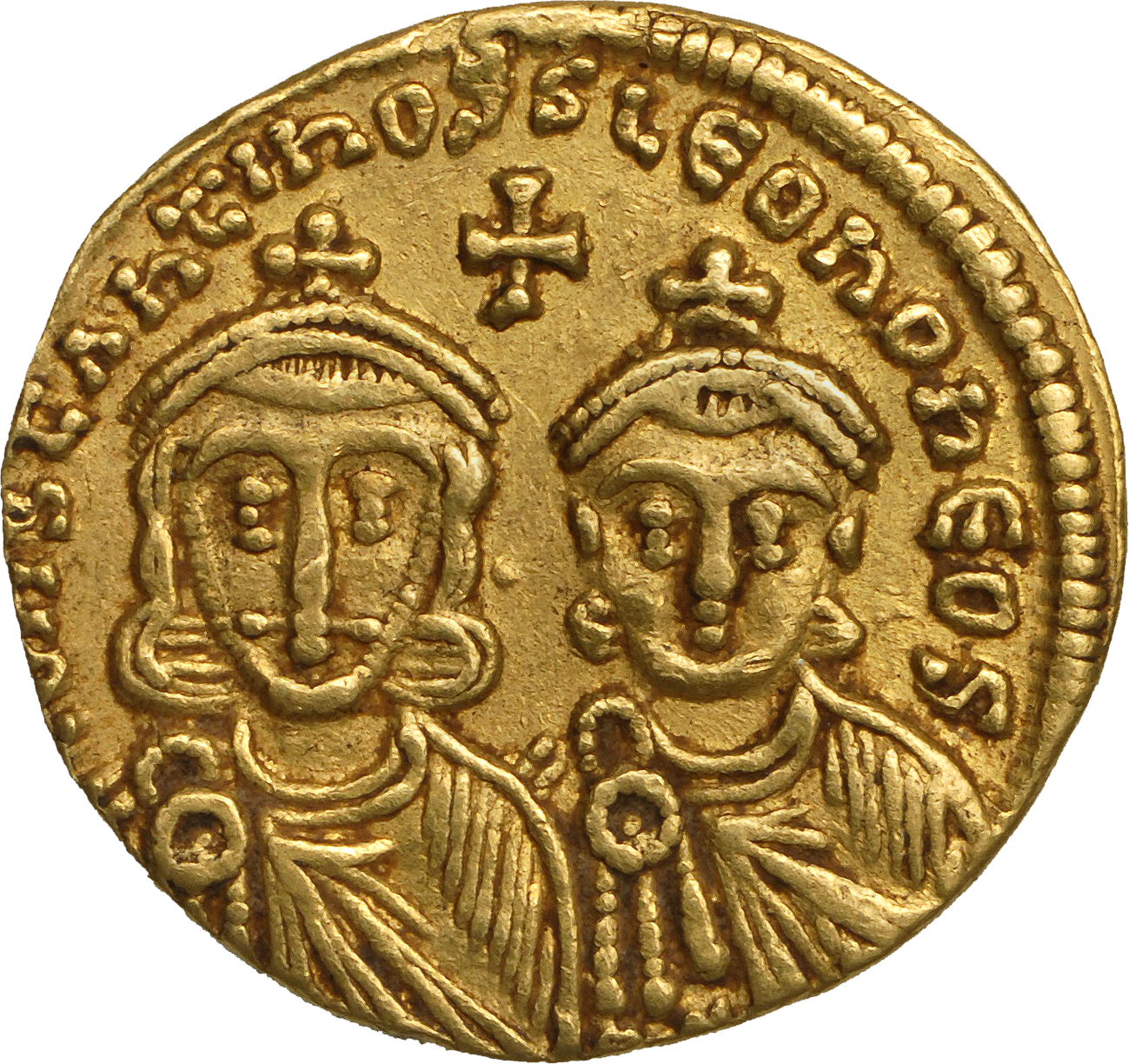
Maria's husband Leo III and son Constantine V on a coin of c. 751–775

The throne of the Byzantine Empire was unstable in the early 710s. Justinian II had been deposed and executed in 711. His deposition was followed by the brief reigns of Philippikos (711–713), Anastasios II (713–715) and Theodosios III (715–717). All three were elevated to the throne after coup d'états by factions of the Byzantine army.

A revolt by Leo, strategos of the Anatolikon Theme, and Artabasdos, strategos of the Armeniac Theme, succeeded in deposing Theodosios. On 25 March 717, Leo was proclaimed emperor in Hagia Sophia. Maria enters historical record at this point as his Empess consort.

In July 718, Maria gave birth to Constantine during an ongoing Siege of Constantinople by Maslama ibn Abd al-Malik, a general of the Umayyad Caliphate. The siege was broken by August of the same year and the Umayyad forces retreated. On 25th, Maria was granted the title of Augusta and her son was baptised by Patriarch Germanus I of Constantinople. Constantine was proclaimed co-emperor in August 720.

Leo remained Emperor to his death on 18 June 741. Whether Maria survived him is unknown.

== Children ==
Maria and Leo III had four known children:

- Anna, wife of Artabasdos (c. 705 – after 772).
- Constantine V (July, 718 – 14 September 775).
- Irene.
- Kosmo.

The names and place of burial of two other daughters were recorded in De Ceremoniis by Constantine VII. However nothing else is known of them.

Royal titles
| Preceded by Theodora of Khazaria | Byzantine Empress consort 717–741 | Succeeded by Tzitzak and Anna |
