= Niketas (son of Artabasdos) =

8th-century Byzantine general

Niketas (Greek: Νικήτας, romanized: Nikétas) was the eldest son of the Byzantine general and usurper Artabasdos (r. 741–743). He served as a general during his father's usurpation against Emperor Constantine V (r. 741–775).

== Biography ==
Niketas was the eldest son of Artabasdos. His mother may have been Anna, but it is not certain: Paul Speck hypothesized that he descended from an earlier marriage, since Artabasdos named his younger brother Nikephoros, and not him, as co-emperor. According to the hagiography of Michael Synkellos, there were further seven siblings, whose names are not mentioned.

In 741 Artabasdos rebelled against his brother-in-law Constantine V, and was crowned emperor. Niketas was then appointed strategos of the Armeniac Theme (some sources call him monostrategos, "commander-in-chief"). In August 742 or 743, however, he was defeated in the Battle of Modrine by the forces of Emperor Constantine V. Niketas fled the field, but regrouped his scattered army and resumed the pursuit of Constantine up to Chrysopolis. Defeated once again by Constantine at a battle near Nicomedia, he was captured and imprisoned. After Constantine regained Constantinople and overthrew Artabasdos in November 743, Niketas was blinded along with his father and Nikephoros and paraded through the Hippodrome of Constantinople.

Nothing is known of him thereafter with certainty; the hagiography of Michael Synkellos records that the deposed imperial family was confined in the Chora Monastery, where Niketas died and was buried, but this is most probably a later invention.

== Sources ==
- Winkelmann, Friedhelm; Lilie, Ralph-Johannes; Ludwig, Claudia; Pratsch, Thomas; Rochow, Ilse; Zielke, Beate (2000). "Niketas (#5374)". Prosopographie der mittelbyzantinischen Zeit: I. Abteilung (641–867), 3. Band: Leon (#4271) – Placentius (#6265) (in German). Berlin, Germany and New York, New York: Walter de Gruyter. pp. 403–404. ISBN 978-3-11-016673-6.
