= Maria (wife of Constantine V) =

Maria II

Empress of the Byzantine Empire
- Tenure: c. 750–751
- Born: 8th century
- Died: 751
- Spouse: Constantine V
Names
- Maria (Μαρία)
- Dynasty: Isaurian Dynasty

Maria II (Greek: Μαρία; died 751) was the second empress consort of Constantine V of the Byzantine Empire.

== Empress ==
Constantine was Emperor since 741. His first wife Tzitzak disappears from the historical record after the birth of their son Leo IV the Khazar on 25 January 750, and Lynda Garland has suggested that she died in childbirth.

Maria married Constantine between 750 and 751 and died soon afterwards of unknown causes. According to the Chronographikon syntomon of Ecumenical Patriarch Nikephoros I of Constantinople, her untimely death occurred at about the same time her stepson Leo IV was crowned co-emperor (6 June 751) and her husband recovered Melitene.

Constantine and Maria had no children. She was succeeded as empress by Eudokia.

Royal titles
Preceded by Tzitzak	Byzantine Empress consort c. 750–751	Succeeded by Eudokia
