= Anna (wife of Artabasdos) =

Wife of Artabasdos

Anna (Greek: Άννα, fl. 715–773 CE) was the wife of Artabasdos, one of two rival Byzantine emperors in a civil war which lasted from June, 741 to November, 743 CE. The other emperor was her brother, Constantine V.

== Family ==
Anna was a daughter of Leo III the Isaurian and his wife Maria. She was a sister of Constantine V. She also had two sisters named Irene and Kosmo, whose names and place of burial were recorded in De Ceremoniis by Constantine VII, however nothing else is known of them.

== Marriage ==
The throne of the Byzantine Empire was unstable in the early 710s. Justinian II had been deposed and executed in 711. His deposition was followed by the brief reigns of Philippikos (711–713), Anastasios II (713–715) and Theodosios III (715–717). All three were elevated to the throne after coup d'états by factions of the Byzantine army.

Under these conditions two military commanders sought each other as allies. According to the chronicle of Theophanes the Confessor, Leo, strategos of the Anatolikon Theme and Artabasdos, strategos of the Armeniac Theme, formed an alliance in 715. Their goal was the eventual deposition of Theodosios and elevation of Leo to the throne. The alliance was sealed with the betrothal of Anna to Artabasdos.

Their revolt was launched two years later and succeeded in both its stated goals. On 25 March 717, Leo was proclaimed emperor in Hagia Sophia. Anna was at this point a member of the new imperial family. Her marriage to Artabasdos followed the successful elevation of her father. Her husband was soon appointed kouropalatēs ("master of the palace") and komēs of the Opsikion theme, while retaining control of his original command.

== Empress ==
The religious policies of Leo III divided the Chalcedonian Christianity of his time to Iconoclasts and Iconodules. With the Emperor leading the former and prosecuting the latter. Leo III the Isaurian died on 18 June 741.

He was succeeded by Constantine V, his only known son. Constantine was also an Iconoclast and enjoyed support from their faction. On the other hand, Artabasdos gathered support from the Iconodules in preparation for a revolt.

In June 741/742, Constantine was crossing Asia Minor to campaign against the Umayyad Caliphate under Hisham ibn Abd al-Malik on the eastern frontier. The forces of Artabasdos attacked his brother-in-law during this course. Defeated, Constantine sought refuge in Amorion, while the victor advanced on Constantinople and was accepted as emperor.

Artabasdos was crowned Emperor by Patriarch Anastasius of Constantinople. Anna was declared an Augusta and their son Nikephoros was raised to co-emperor. Artabasdus declared himself the "Protector of the Holy Icons" and sought to secure himself in the throne. His main support base consisted of the Armeniac, Opsikion and the province of Thrace. He was recognised as Emperor by Iconodule religious leaders, including Pope Zachary.

The civil war lasted for about two years, ending with the defeat of Artabasdos. The first major battle took place near Sardis, Lydia in May 743. An army led by Niketas, another son of Artabasdos, was defeated in August. Constantine headed for Constantinople and managed to capture the city three months later. Artabasdos was deposed on 2 November 743.

== Retirement ==
Theophanes records that Constantine had Artabasdos, Nikephoros, and Niketas first incarcerated and then subjected to public humiliation in the Hippodrome of Constantinople. All three were then blinded and exiled to the monastery of Chora. According to Life of Michael the Syncellus:

'after blinding the husband of his sister Anna, the most orthodox ruler Artabasdus, Constantine banished him with his wife and his nine children to the aforesaid monastery (of Chora on the outskirts of Constantinople), after he had turned the monastery into a lodging house for laymen'.

Anna and the other seven of her children, mentioned but not named, reportedly followed them to their monastic retirement. Anna was the caretaker of her husband and her children to their deaths. All were eventually buried in Chora. Thirty years after the suppression of the rebellion, Constantine reportedly forced Anna to dig up Artabasdus' bones, place them in her cloak (pallium), and throw them into the so-called tombs of Pelagius, charnel pits, among the bodies of executed criminals. (Note: Theophanes AM 6235 [AD 742/3])

At some point the relics of Patriarch Germanus I of Constantinople were transferred to Chora and the monastery became a shrine to iconodule martyrs.

Her year of death is unknown but she is not mentioned following the reign of her brother.

== Children ==
Anna and Artabasdos had a reported number of nine children:

- Niketas. Strategos of the Armeniacs under his father.
- Nikephoros. Co-emperor from 741 to 743.
- Seven other unknown children.

Niketas was the eldest son, as in the Chronographikon syntomon of Patriarch Nikephoros I, his name is mentioned prior to Nikephoros. This led the Byzantinist Paul Speck in his 1981 biography Artabasdos: Der rechtgläubige Vorkämpfer der göttlichen Lehren : Untersuchungen zur Revolte des Artabasdos und ihrer Darstellung in der byzantinischen Historiographie to suggest that Niketas was the eldest son but from a previous marriage, with Nikephoros being the eldest by Anna.

== Notes ==
Royal titles
Preceded by Maria	Byzantine Empress consort 741–743 with Tzitzak (741–743)	Succeeded by Tzitzak
Preceded by Anastasia	Empress-Mother of the Byzantine Empire; 741–743	Succeeded by Irene of Athens
