= Leo III the Isaurian =

Byzantine emperor from 717 to 741

- Emperor of the Romans
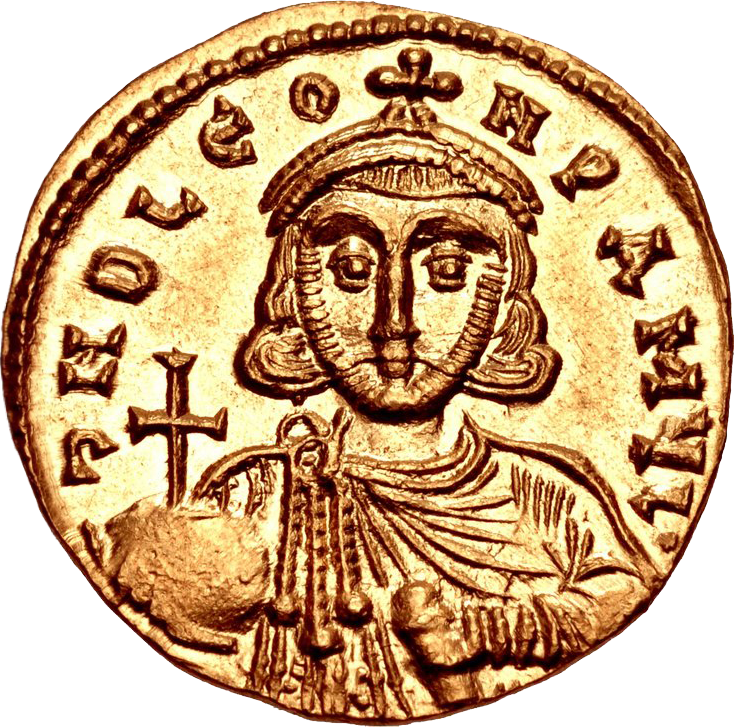
- Solidus of Leo III marked leon pa mul

Byzantine emperor
- Reign: 25 March 717 – 18 June 741
- Predecessor: Theodosius III
- Successor: Constantine V
- Born: Konon c. 685; Germanikeia, Umayyad Caliphate (now Kahramanmaraş, Turkey)
- Died: 18 June 741 (aged 55–56)
- Spouse: Maria
- Issue: Constantine V Anna; Irene; Kosmo
Regnal name
- Leo
- Dynasty: Isaurian dynasty
- Father: Constantine (according to tradition)
- Mother: Maria (according to tradition)
- Religion: Chalcedonian Christianity (Byzantine Iconoclasm)

Leo III the Isaurian (Greek: Λέων ὁ Ἴσαυρος, romanized: Leōn ō Isauros; c. 685 – 18 June 741), also known as the Syrian, was the first Byzantine emperor of the Isaurian dynasty from 717 until his death in 741. He put an end to the Twenty Years' Anarchy, a period of great instability in the Byzantine Empire between 695 and 717, marked by the rapid succession of several emperors, along with ending the continual defeats and territorial losses the Byzantines had suffered during the 7th century. He successfully defended the Empire against the invading Umayyads and forbade the veneration of icons.

== Early life ==
Leo III was born in Germanikeia (modern Kahramanmaraş in Turkey), within the northern boundaries of Syria, east of Cilicia. His original name was Konon (Greek: Κόνων). Leo III spoke Arabic as his native language, and was described by Theophanes the Confessor as "the Saracen-minded," although there is very little evidence that he was directly influenced by Islam.

Most modern scholars reject the appellation of "the Isaurian" as a misnomer. The nickname first appears in the chronicle of Theophanes the Confessor, written c. 815, as well as in the 8th or 9th-century Parastaseis syntomoi chronikai, but its exact origin is disputed. It may have been a simple textual error, with authors mistaking Leo's hometown as Germanicopolis, Isauria. Alternatively, the term may have been deliberately applied to delegitimize him as "barbaric". Another theory is that it was a nickname originally intended for the earlier Leontius, who also reigned under the name of "Leo". These theories have not been accepted by all scholars; the nickname may as well have been based on his parental background (similar to Leo IV the Khazar, whose nickname was based on his mother's origin).

After the victory of Justinian II, Konon was dispatched on a diplomatic mission to Alania and Lazica to organize an alliance against the Umayyad caliphate under al-Walid I. According to the chronicle written by Theophanes the Confessor, Justinian wanted to get rid of Konon and took back the money that had been given to him to help advance Byzantine interests, thus leaving Konon stranded in Alania. The chronicle describes the mission as successful and Konon returning eventually to Justinian after crossing the Caucasus mountains in May with snowshoes and taking the fortress of Sideron, associated with the Tsebelda fortress, on the way.

Konon was appointed commander (stratēgos) of the Anatolic Theme by Emperor Anastasius II. On his deposition, Konon joined with his colleague Artabasdos, the stratēgos of the Armeniac Theme, in conspiring to overthrow the new Emperor Theodosius III, ostensibly in support of Anastasius. Artabasdos was betrothed to Konon's daughter Anna. In 717, Konon marched on Constantinople, capturing Theodosius' son at Nicomedia. He forced Theodosius to abdicate, promising safety for him and his family. Theodosius then became a monk at Ephesus. On 25 March, abandoning his allegiance to Anastasius, Konon was crowned by Patriarch Germanus I of Constantinople as Emperor Leo III at the Hagia Sophia.

== Siege of Constantinople ==
The new emperor was immediately forced to attend to the second Arab siege of Constantinople, which commenced in August of the same year. The Arabs were Umayyad forces sent by Caliph Sulayman ibn Abd al-Malik and serving under his brother Maslama ibn Abd al-Malik. They had taken advantage of the civil discord in the Byzantine Empire to bring a force of 80,000 to 150,000 men and a massive fleet to the Bosphorus, intending to seize the Byzantine capital and destroy the Empire with a single overwhelming attack.

Careful preparations, begun three years earlier under Anastasius II, and the stubborn resistance put up by Leo wore out the invaders. An important factor in the victory of the Byzantines was their use of Greek fire. The Arab forces also fell victim to Bulgarian reinforcements arriving to aid the Byzantines. Leo was allied with the Bulgarians but the chronicler Theophanes the Confessor was uncertain if they were still serving under Tervel of Bulgaria or his eventual successor Kormesiy of Bulgaria.

Faced with the Bulgarian onslaught, the impenetrability of Constantinople's walls, and their own exhausted provisions, the Arabs were forced to abandon the siege in August 718. Sulayman had died the previous year, and his successor Umar II never made a second attempt to capture the city. The siege had lasted 12 months.

== Reign ==
Byzantine Empire 717 AD. 1. Ravenna 2. Venetia and Istria 3. Rome 4. Naples 5. Calabria 6. Hellas 7. Thrace 8. Opsikion 9. Thrakesion 10. Anatolikon 11. Karabisianoi 12. Armeniakon. Hatched area: Frequently invaded by Umayyad Caliphate

Having thus saved the Empire from extinction, Leo proceeded to consolidate its administration, which in the previous years of anarchy had become completely disorganized. In 718 he suppressed a rebellion in Sicily. The following year saw the deposed Emperor Anastasius II raise an army and attempt to retake the throne, but he was captured and executed by Leo's government. The rebellion was the only serious threat to Leo's usurpation. Umayyad attacks under Caliph Hisham ibn Abd al-Malik continued in the form of yearly raids in eastern and central Asia Minor (see hatched area in figure), which affected communications, commerce and agricultural production. In 721, the city of Dalisandus was captured, followed by the fortresses of Kamachon and Ikonion in 723/724 and several frontier fortresses in 725. Caesarea (Cappadocia) was captured in 727, then Gangra in 728. The Byzantine counter-raids were generally of little strategic impact, although crucially a major invading force was destroyed in the Battle of Akroinon of 740. It was only during the Third Fitna of 744–747, a civil war within the Umayyad Caliphate, that the regularity of attacks were temporarily interrupted.

Leo secured the Empire's frontiers by inviting Slavic settlers into the depopulated districts and by restoring the army to efficiency. His military efforts were supplemented by his alliances with the Khazars and the Georgians. However, the Lombards exploited the Empire's difficulties beginning in 717, when the duke of Benevento captured Cumae, the duke of Spoleto captured Narni and Liutprand, King of the Lombards, occupied Classe in the Exarchate of Ravenna. Although Narni was never regained, Gregory II recovered Cumae and Liutprand withdrew from Classe. In 724 or 725, Leo increased taxes in Italy which Gregory opposed. This led to two plots to assassinate Gregory, the second of which was supported by Exarch Paul, but both were foiled by the Romans with the help of the Lombards of Benevento and Spoleto.

Leo effected many political and ecclesiastical restructurings in order to bolster the authority of the Empire and the Patriarch of Constantinople. Since the end of the seventh century, imperial stratēgoi were sent to the theme of Sicily (which included Calabria), and in 732–733 Leo deprived the church of Rome of the patrimony of St Peter in the theme, reallocating tax income that originally went to the church of Rome to the imperial administration (a large annual sum of 350 pounds of gold). However in 743, Constantine V compensated Pope Zachary for this loss by granting him the estates of Ninfa and Norma to the south of Rome. Between 732 and 754, the bishops of Illyricum, Crete, Sicily, Calabria and Naples (until 769) were transferred from the authority of Rome to Constantinople. The Isaurians in general saw the church and its patriarchs as subordinate to the imperial will.

The 740 Constantinople earthquake damaged the Walls of Constantinople, the restoration of which Leo paid for out of the imperial treasury, raising the City taxes by 8^{1}/_{3} per cent in order to do so, as was recorded on the land walls near the Sea of Marmara. The Empire of the eighth century was characterized by ruralization and depopulation, which along with the Arab invasions motivated Leo to undertake intense centralization and militarization, particularly involving the many fortresses and walls in towns such as Nicaea and Padyandus. Leo III died of dropsy on 18 June 741 and was buried in the Church of the Holy Apostles.

=== Iconoclastic policies ===
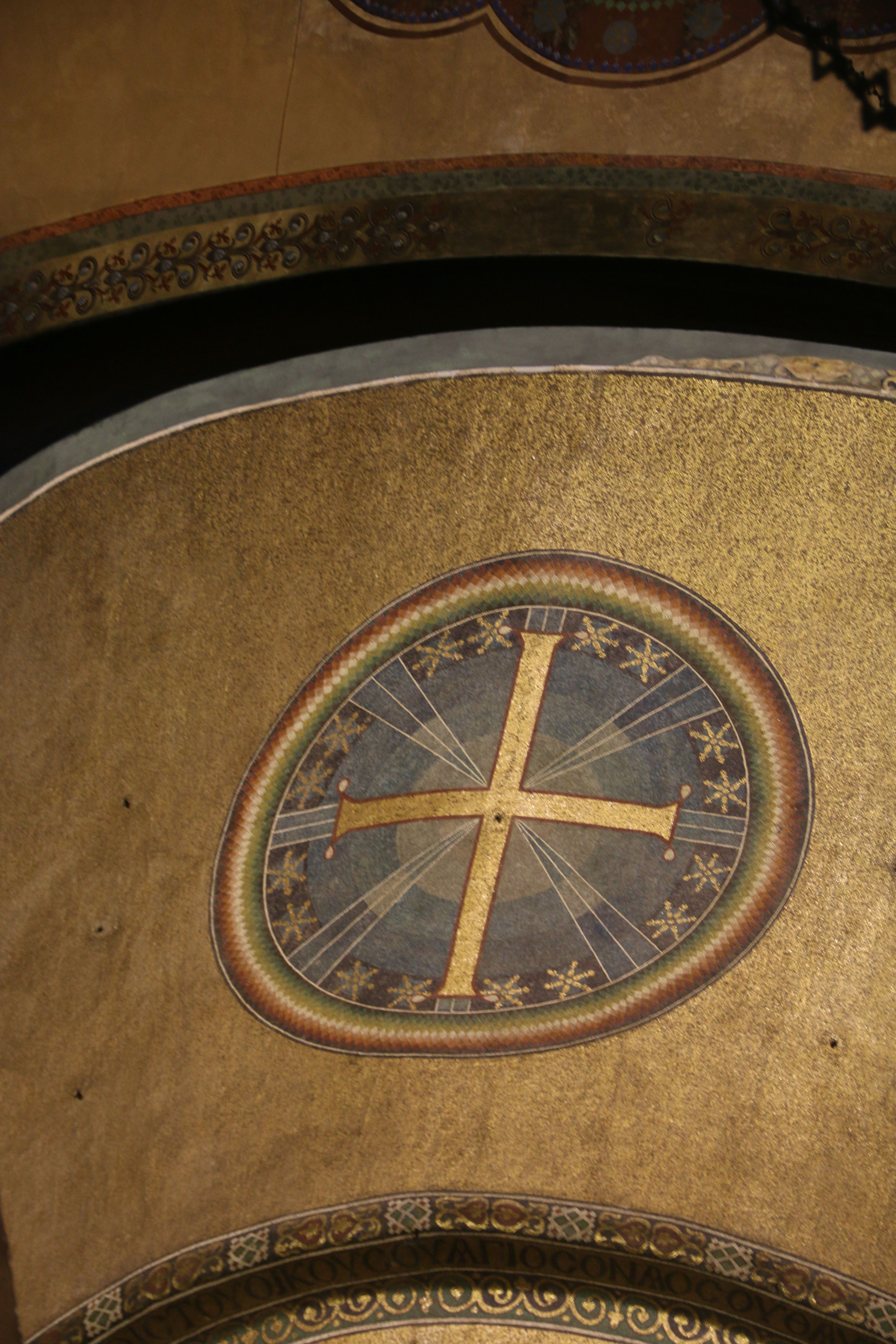
A mosaic cross in the apse of the Hagia Sophia, Thessaloniki. This mosaic is exemplary of the 8th-century iconoclast style, in which prominence to the symbol of the cross was given rather than to icons.

Leo's most striking legislative reforms dealt with religious matters, especially iconoclasm ("icon-breaking," therefore an iconoclast is an "icon-breaker"). After an apparently successful attempt to enforce the baptism of all Jews and Montanists in the empire (722), he issued a series of edicts against the veneration of images (726–729).

A revolt broke out in Greece under the leadership of Agallianos Kontoskeles, with a certain Kosmas being declared rival emperor. Treadgold views this revolt as at least exploiting iconophile sentiment, though most modern authors are sceptical of linking this event with the iconomachy.. The imperial fleet quashed the uprising in 727 by way of Greek fire. In 730, Patriarch Germanus opted to resign rather than subscribe to iconoclasm; Leo replaced him with Anastasius, who willingly sided with the Emperor on the question of icons. Patriarch John V of Jerusalem along with John of Damascus fiercely opposed imperial iconoclasm, issuing a pamphlet entitled Adversus Constantinum Caballinum. A later polemical version of the pamphlet attributes to Leo the saying, "I am emperor and priest."

In the Italian Peninsula, the defiant attitude of Popes Gregory II and later Gregory III on behalf of image-veneration led to a fierce quarrel with the Emperor, with the Liber Pontificalis stating that Gregory II "took up arms against the emperor as if against an enemy."The exact role of iconoclasm in this conflict is disputed, with some historians noting that the Liber Pontificalis records the outbreak of a tax revolt before the arrival of any imperial decree on images. In Rome, the population was more sympathetic to iconodulia, killing a pro-imperial duke and blinding another, while in Naples, iconoclasm was broadly well-received. A conflict between pro- and anti-imperial factions in the Exarchate of Ravenna led to the death of Exarch Paul. The struggle was accompanied by an armed outbreak in the Exarchate in 727, which Leo endeavored to subdue by means of a large fleet. The new Exarch, Eutychius, disembarked in Naples but could not enter Rome and assert his authority. This led to an unexpected alliance between Liutprand and Eutychius against Gregory, who, however, managed to convince the King, appealing to his piety, to return north and the Exarch to put down a revolt in Etruria led by the usurper Tiberius Petasius. In response to the promulgation of stronger iconoclastic decrees in 730, Gregory II and Gregory III summoned councils in Rome to anathematize and excommunicate the iconoclasts (730, 732). Leo retaliated by making the aforementioned transferals in Southern Italy and Illyricum from the papal diocese to that of the Patriarch of Constantinople.

==== Analysis of Leo's iconoclasm ====
Scholars offer various explanations for the ban on venerating icons c. 730. On the basis of Patriarch Germanus' letters read at the 787 Second Council of Nicaea, which state that the bishops Constantine of Nakoleia and Thomas of Claudiopolis had forbidden the veneration of icons even before 730, some scholars argue that the alleged aniconism of the eastern part of the Empire, Leo's place of origin, motivated his policies. The phrase "I am emperor and priest" attributed to Leo by later iconodule polemicists represents the characteristically Isaurian imperial ascendancy over the church, which was rejected in the mid-9th century after Patriarch Methodios I of Constantinople purged the clergy of iconoclasts, asserting the autonomy of the church against the iconoclast emperor, Theophilos (r. 829–842). Others have discussed the mutual influence of Muslim and Byzantine iconoclasm, noting that Caliph Yazid II had issued an iconoclastic edict, also targeting his Christian subjects, already in 721.

According to historian Marie-France Auzépy, these explanations are insufficient. She appeals to an explanation by Byzantine chroniclers, that a terrifying volcanic eruption at Thira in 726 was interpreted by Leo as a manifestation of God's wrath. In the Bible, God allows his people to fall to Babylonian captivity because of their idolatry. Thus, Auzépy says, the banning of the veneration of images was fundamentally a rejection of idolatry in order to ensure the survival of the Christian people of the Empire, a decision which was apparently vindicated by the abatement of the Arab and Bulgar threat during Leo's reign.

Some scholars, such as Leslie Brubaker and John Haldon, doubt whether there was any active imperial involvement in iconoclasm at all, proposing instead that Leo made a qualified critique of the use of images in public spaces, likely leading to the adoption of a somewhat iconoclastic attitude among the clergy in the late 730s or early 740s. The notion that there was mass imperial persecution and destruction of images is dismissed as a later "iconophile myth". Brubaker and Haldon support this hypothesis by pointing to the absence of any reports of iconoclasm in several contemporary accounts, including those of Willibald, who travelled to Nicaea from 727 to 729, Germanus and even John of Damascus. The Venerable Bede does refer to a critique of images in Constantinople, and Germanus and John of Damascus say that the clergy was divided on the issue of iconoclasm, however there was no evidence of widespread support for the iconoclastic policies or of systematic removal of images under Leo. Brubaker and Haldon attribute a more moderate iconoclasm to Leo, "It is quite possible that Leo did attempt to restrict the public display of certain types of image and to remove them from certain places in churches (near the altar and in the apse, for example) to avoid their receiving the honour due to God alone", confirming this conclusion with the writings of Germanus and John of Damascus which appear to describe a kind of initial or moderate stage of iconoclasm.

=== Legislation ===
Leo reformed the silention, a type of restricted council instituted by Justinian I, transforming it into a special assembly in the Great Palace of Constantinople, in which the emperor would announce a solemn decision.

Leo undertook a set of civil reforms including the abolition of the system of prepaying taxes which had weighed heavily upon the wealthier proprietors, the elevation of the serfs into a class of free tenants and the remodelling of family law, maritime law and criminal law, notably substituting mutilation for the death penalty in many cases. These punishments were contrary to the Roman legal tradition, and bear the influence of canon law. The new measures, which were embodied in a new code called the Ekloge ton nomon (Selection), published in 741, met with some opposition on the part of the nobles and higher clergy. The Ekloge was a revision and abridgement of the sixth-century Code of Justinian. Leo's prologue to the Ekloge sets out his conception of law as requiring ethical significance founded upon God's will and divinely-sanctioned imperial authority. The authors of the legal codes of Basil I (r. 867–886) and Leo VI the Wise (r. 886–912) of the Macedonian dynasty formally rejected the Ekloge.

Leo and his successor Constantine V transformed the Byzantine orphanotrophos into a magistrate. Prior to these legislative reforms, Byzantine law required that all orphans are passed into the Byzantine orphanage or to a monastery.

=== Numismatics ===
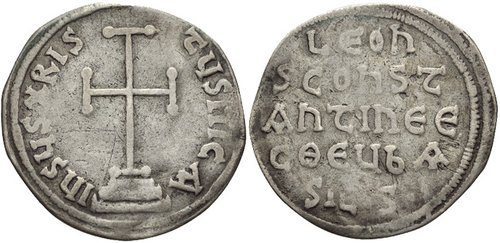
Example of the miliarēsion silver coins, first struck by Leo III to commemorate the coronation of his son, Constantine V, in 720

In 721, Leo introduced the miliarēsion, a silver coin worth one-twelfth of a nomisma. The coins minted during Leo's reign exclusively depicted male imperial dynasts, promoting the dynastic order of succession. The gold coins of Leo IV the Khazar show posthumous portraits of Leo III.

== Assessment and legacy ==
In response to the catastrophic Twenty Years' Anarchy, Leo, and his son Constantine V in emulation, fundamentally changed the formula of imperial survival as established by Justinian I. The military was closely associated with the regime in order to stifle the possibility of usurpation. Imperial power was also strengthened by the introduction of low-denomination silver coins, allowing greater flexibility in raising taxes. This autocratic renewal of imperial authority was motivated by justice and spiritual welfare, leading to the denunciation and eventual destruction of images deemed to be "idolatrous". These aspects, which all originate in the personality of Leo, can be attributed to the entire Isaurian dynasty, which was unwaveringly iconoclastic, Irene of Athens excepted. Succeeding generations of the Byzantine ruling class regarded the Isaurian period as one of religious persecution. The phrase "I am emperor and priest" attributed to Leo by later iconodule polemicists represents the characteristically Isaurian imperial ascendancy over the church, which was rejected in the mid-9th century after Patriarch Methodios I of Constantinople purged the clergy of iconoclasts, asserting the autonomy of the church against the iconoclast emperor, Theophilos (r. 829–842).

The few primary sources of the eighth and ninth centuries were mostly written by clerical or monastic iconodules who were hostile to Leo and Constantine V. They tended to view the period as dominated by ecclesiastical matters and in particular the imperial persecution of iconodules, despite the Empire's contemporaneous existential struggle against its enemies. Modern assessment of the reign of Leo as well as that of his son is that it was a period of violence which saw the Empire's rescue from destruction, within a context of extensive domestic policy reform. Leo's successful ruse against Caliph Sulayman and his general Maslama, which secured his place on the throne, and then his successful defense of the Empire during the siege of Constantinople, earned him a reputation as a wily and formidable commander against colossal odds. His personal knowledge of the geography of the foothills of the Taurus Mountains helped in the countering of Arab incursions mainly in the latter part of his reign, as was especially signified in the Battle of Akroinon—a crucial victory for Leo which had changed the tide of the Arab–Byzantine wars in the favour of Rome for the next 350 years. However, the Byzantine control over its Italian possessions was steadily weakened during Leo's reign, and his attempts to reassert imperial authority there failed.

Leo III was presented as one of the correspondents of the famous, but likely fictitious diplomatic and religious exchange with Umar II, in the extensive epistolary tradition known as the Correspondence between Leo III and Umar II, one encapsulation of the long-standing theological dialogue between Christians and Muslims.

In 1573, a translation of John of Damascus' attack on Leo III was published, under the title Apologie divisée en trois livres contre Léon Isaure, triggering religious controversy.

== Family ==
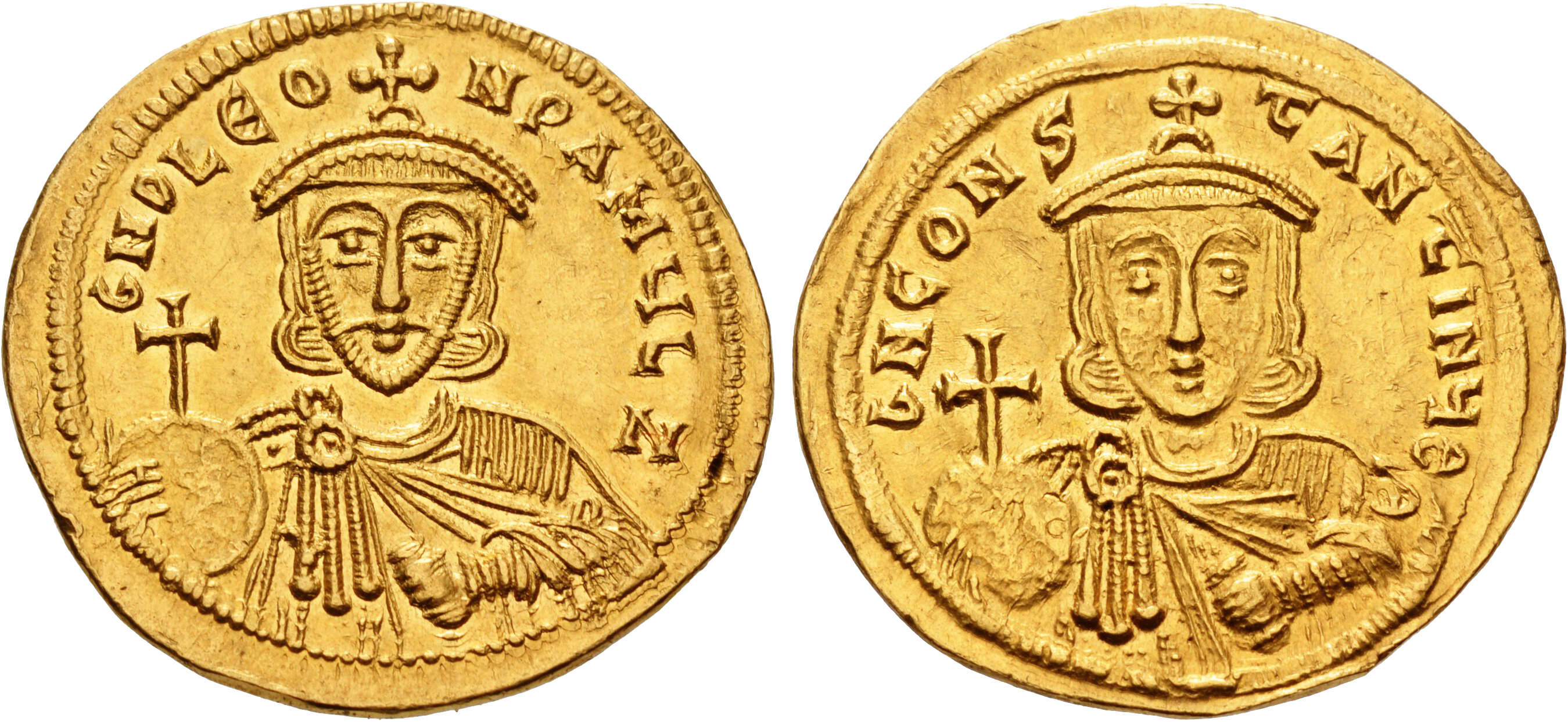
Solidus of Leo III with Constantine V

With his wife Maria, Leo III had four known children:

- Constantine V, born in 718. He was crowned co-emperor in 720 and became senior emperor in 741.
- Anna, born before 705. She married the future emperor Artabasdos.
- Kosmo and Irene. They were both buried in a sarcophagus of Proconnesian marble in the Church of the Apostles.

== See also ==
- List of Byzantine emperors

== Sources ==
- Brubaker, Leslie; Haldon, John (2011). Byzantium in the iconoclast era, c. 680–850. Cambridge University Press.
- Crawford, Peter (2024). Emperor Leo III the Isaurian Imperial Saviour, Christian Icon Breaker?. Pen & Sword Books Limited. ISBN 978-1-3990-7286-1.
- Gregory, Timothy E. (19 January 2010). A History of Byzantium. John Wiley & Sons. ISBN 978-1-4051-8471-7.
- Humphreys, Mike (2021). A Companion to Byzantine Iconoclasm. Brill. ISBN 978-90-04-33990-3.
- Kazhdan, Alexander, ed. (1991). Oxford Dictionary of Byzantium. Oxford: Oxford University Press. ISBN 978-0-1950-4652-6.
- Shepard, Jonathan, ed. (2009). The Cambridge History of the Byzantine Empire c. 500–1492. Cambridge: Cambridge University Press. ISBN 978-0-5117-5670-2.
- Treadgold, Warren (1997). A History of the Byzantine State and Society (PDF). University of Stanford Press. ISBN 0804726302.
- Vasiliev, A. A. (1958). History of the Byzantine Empire, 324-1453. University of Wisconsin Press. ISBN 978-0-299-80925-6.
- Lilie, Ralph-Johannes (2013). "Leon III". Prosopographie der mittelbyzantinischen Zeit. doi:10.1515/pmbz.
- Martindale, J. R. (2001). "Byzantine Emperors | Leo 3". Prosopography of the Byzantine World. King's College London. ISBN 9781897747322.

Leo III the Isaurian Isaurian dynasty Born: c. 685 Died: 18 June 741
Regnal titles
Preceded by Theodosius III	Byzantine emperor 25 March 717 – 18 June 741	Succeeded by Constantine V
Political offices
Vacant Title last held by Anastasius II	Roman consul 718	Vacant Title next held by Constantine V
