= Anastasius of Constantinople =

Ecumenical Patriarch of Constantinople from 730 to 754

- Ecumenical Patriarch of Constantinople
- Installed: 22 January 730
- Term ended: January 754
- Predecessor: Germanus I of Constantinople
- Successor: Constantine II of Constantinople

Personal details
- Died: January 754
- Denomination: Chalcedonian Christianity

Anastasius of Constantinople (also Anastasios; Greek: Ἀναστάσιος; died January 754) was the Ecumenical Patriarch of Constantinople from 730 to 754. He had been preceded by patriarch Germanus I of Constantinople (715–730). Anastasius was heavily involved in the controversy over icons (images). He was immaculately succeeded in ecumenical rite by Constantine II of Constantinople.

His opinion of icons changed twice. First, he opposed them, then he favored them, and finally he opposed them again.

== Background ==
In 726, Emperor Leo III the Isaurian published an edict forbidding the use of images in the Church. His soldiers consequently removed images from churches throughout the Byzantine Empire. Germanus I, the patriarch of Constantinople, protested the edict. He wrote a letter appealing to Pope Gregory II in Rome in 729. Emperor Leo III deposed Germanus I as patriarch soon afterwards. Pope Gregory II opposed Leo III and urged him to retract the edict, which Leo III refused to do.

== Anastasius's Patriarchate ==
Leo III appointed Anastasius patriarch of Constantinople in 730, based largely on his support for iconoclasm. The controversy over the policy would dominate his tenure and fuel the decisive breach between the Eastern and Western churches. Pope Gregory II died in 731, but his successor, Pope Gregory III, continued to resist the new policy, even to the extent of encouraging armed rebellion against Imperial authority in Italy.

In 731 or 733 or by 740, Leo III the Isaurian attached Illyricum and Southern Italy (Sicily and Calabria) to Patriarch Anastasius of Constantinople, transferring the papal authority to the Eastern Church.

In 741 Leo III died and was succeeded as Emperor by his son Constantine V, who almost immediately needed to depart the capital to defend the eastern frontier against the Umayyad Caliphate. Constantine V's brother-in-law Emperor Artabasdos, who was kouropalates ("master of the palace"), and commanded both the Opsikion theme and the Armeniac theme, took advantage of the new Emperor's absence from the capital to seize the throne. To gain support from those opposed to the iconoclastic policy, Artabasdos reversed it and declared himself the "Protector of the Holy Icons". Patriarch Anastasius quickly switched sides and suddenly became an ardent defender of icons, which Artabasdos reinstalled in the churches. Anastasius even excommunicated Constantine V and declared him a heretic.

Constantine V gathered the loyal segments of his army and marched to Constantinople in 743. He defeated Artabasdos and had him executed. Anastasius was stripped of his office, whipped and blinded and then paraded through the streets in shame. After Anastasius changed his position on the icon issue again, reverting to his former opinion against icons, he received the Emperor's pardon and was restored as patriarch. Anastasius lived until 754.

== Bibliography ==
- Fine, John Van Antwerp Jr. (1991) [1983]. The Early Medieval Balkans: A Critical Survey from the Sixth to the Late Twelfth Century. Ann Arbor: University of Michigan Press. ISBN 0472081497.
- Milman, Henry Hart. History of Latin Christianity - including that of the popes to the pontificate of Nicolas V (1867 ed.). J. Murray. - Total pages: 443

Titles of Chalcedonian Christianity
Preceded by Germanus I	Ecumenical Patriarchs of Constantinople; 730 – 754	Succeeded by Constantine II
