= Praenetus =

Town of ancient Bithynia

Coordinates: 40°41′23″N 29°37′08″E

Praenetus or Prainetos (Ancient Greek: Πραίνετος), also known as Prinetos or Prinetus (Πρίνετος) was a town of ancient Bithynia on the coast of the Propontis. It is on the east of Karamürsel and at the southern entrance of the Sinus Astacenus. It was situated 28 Roman miles to the northwest of Nicaea. Stephanus of Byzantium calls it Pronectus or Pronektos (Πρόνεκτος) and states that it was founded by the Phoenicians. If this be true, it would be a very ancient place, which can scarcely be conceived, as it is mentioned only by very late writers. According to Cedrenus it was destroyed by an earthquake. It was a bishopric; no longer the seat of a residential bishop, it remains a titular see of the Roman Catholic Church.

Its site is located near Karamürsel, in Asiatic Turkey.
