= 740 Constantinople earthquake =

740 Earthquake in Constantinople

Coordinates: 41.0082°N 28.9784°E

The 740 Constantinople earthquake took place on 26 October, 740, in the vicinity of Constantinople and the Sea of Marmara.

== History ==
In Constantinople, the earthquake caused the collapse of many public buildings. The Walls of Constantinople were also damaged. The casualties in Constantinople reportedly included over 1,000 people.

The earthquake reportedly destroyed a number of towns in Thrace. It also damaged the cities of Nicaea (İznik), Nicomedia (İzmit), and Praenetus.

The historians Theophanes the Confessor (8th-9th centuries) and George Kedrenos (11th century) reported that the earthquake caused the sea to retreat from the coast in many places. The sea soon returned, and flooded many towns. The description given matches that of a seismic sea-wave (tsunami).

The date of the earthquake is recorded by (among others) Anastasius Bibliothecarius (9th century), Joannes Zonaras (12th century), Carolus Sigonius (16th century), Caesar Baronius (16th-17th centuries), and Sethus Calvisius (16th-17th centuries).
