= Artabasdos =

Artabasdos Արտավազդ
- Emperor of the Romans
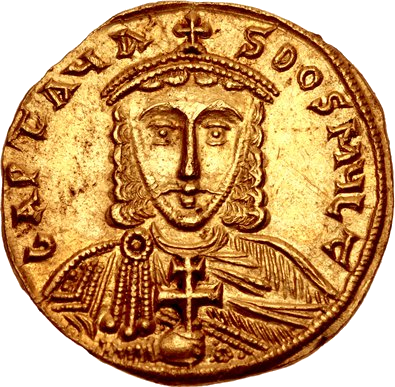
- Solidus of Artabasdos

Byzantine emperor
- Reign: June 741 – 2 November 743
- Predecessor: Constantine V
- Successor: Constantine V
- Co-emperor: Nikephoros
Pre-imperial positions
Count of Opsikion Patrikios Kouropalates
In office c. 718 – June 741
Monarch	Leo III the Isaurian
Strategos of Armeniakon Patrikios
In office c. 713 – c. 718
Monarch	Theodosius III
- Born: Before 713
- Died: 743
- Consort: Anna
- Issue: Nikephoros; Niketas
Names
- Artabasdus; Artabasdos; Արտավազդ; Artavazd
- Dynasty: Isaurian

Artabasdos or Artavasdos (Greek: Ἀρταύασδος or Ἀρτάβασδος, from Armenian: Արտավազդ, Artavazd, Ardavazt, Latinized as Artabasdus) was a Byzantine general of Armenian descent who seized the throne from June 741 until November 743, in usurpation of the reign of Constantine V.

== Rise to power ==
In about 713, Emperor Anastasius II appointed Artabasdos as governor (stratēgos) of the Armeniac Theme (Θέμα Άρμενιάκων, Thema Armeniakōn), the successor of the Army of Armenia, which occupied the old areas of the Pontus, Armenia Minor, and northern Cappadocia, with its capital at Amasea. After Anastasius's fall, Artabasdos made an agreement with his colleague Leo, the governor of the Anatolic Theme, to overthrow the new Emperor Theodosius III. This agreement was sealed with the engagement of Leo's daughter Anna to Artabasdos, and the marriage took place after Leo III ascended the throne in March 717.

Artabasdos was awarded the rank of kouropalates ("master of the palace") and became commander (count, komēs) of the Opsikion Theme, while retaining control of his original command. In June 741, after the accession of Leo's son Constantine V to the throne, Artabasdos resolved to seize the throne and attacked his brother-in-law while the latter was traversing Asia Minor to fight the Arabs on the eastern frontier. While Constantine fled to Amorion, Artabasdus seized Constantinople amid popular support and was crowned emperor in the summer of 742.

== Reign and downfall ==
While according to Theophanes the Confessor and Patriarch Nikephoros I of Constantinople, Artabasdos abandoned his predecessor's religious policy of iconoclasm and authorised the cult of images with some support, there is actually little support from contemporary sources. Soon after his accession, Artabasdus crowned his wife Anna as augusta and his son Nikephoros as co-emperor, while putting his other son Niketas in charge of the Armeniac Theme. Artabasdos was supported by the themes of Opsikion and Thrace along with the Armeniacs, while Constantine was supported by the fleet of the Cibyrrhaeot Theme and the armies of the Anatolic and Thracesian themes.

The inevitable clash came in May 743, when Artabasdos led the offensive against Constantine but was defeated. Later the same year Constantine defeated Niketas, and on 2 November 743, Artabasdos's reign came to an end as Constantine V entered Constantinople. Artabasdos, accompanied by his close associate Baktangios fled to the castle of Pouzanes in Opsikion (Asia Minor), where they were apprehended and brought to Constantinople. Artabasdos and his sons were publicly blinded and relegated to the Chora Monastery on the outskirts of Constantinople.

== Family ==
By his wife Anna, the daughter of Emperor Leo III, Artabasdos had nine children, including:

- Nikephoros, made co-emperor by his father.
- Niketas, who was strategos of the Armeniac theme

== See also ==
- List of Byzantine emperors

== Bibliography ==
Notes

References

- Auzépy, Marie-France (2008). "State of emergency (700–850)". In Shepard, Jonathan (ed.). The Cambridge history of the Byzantine Empire (c. 500–1492). Cambridge University Press. ISBN 978-0-521-83231-1.
- Beckwith, Christopher I. (5 April 2009). Empires of the Silk Road. Princeton (N.J.): Princeton University Press. ISBN 978-0-691-13589-2.
- Brubaker, Haldon; Leslie, John (2011). Byzantium in the Iconoclast Era. Cambridge: Cambridge University Press. p. 159. ISBN 978-1-107-62629-4.
- Garland, Lynda (2006). Byzantine women: varieties of experience 800–1200 (2006 ed.). Ashgate Publishing. ISBN 0-7546-5737-X. - Total pages: 226
- Treadgold, Warren (1997). A History of the Byzantine State and Society. Stanford University Press. ISBN 978-0-8047-2630-6.

Artabasdos Isaurian Dynasty Born: unknown Died: 743
Regnal titles
Preceded by Constantine V	Byzantine Emperor; 741/2–743	Succeeded by Constantine V
