= List of Roman and Byzantine imperial burials =

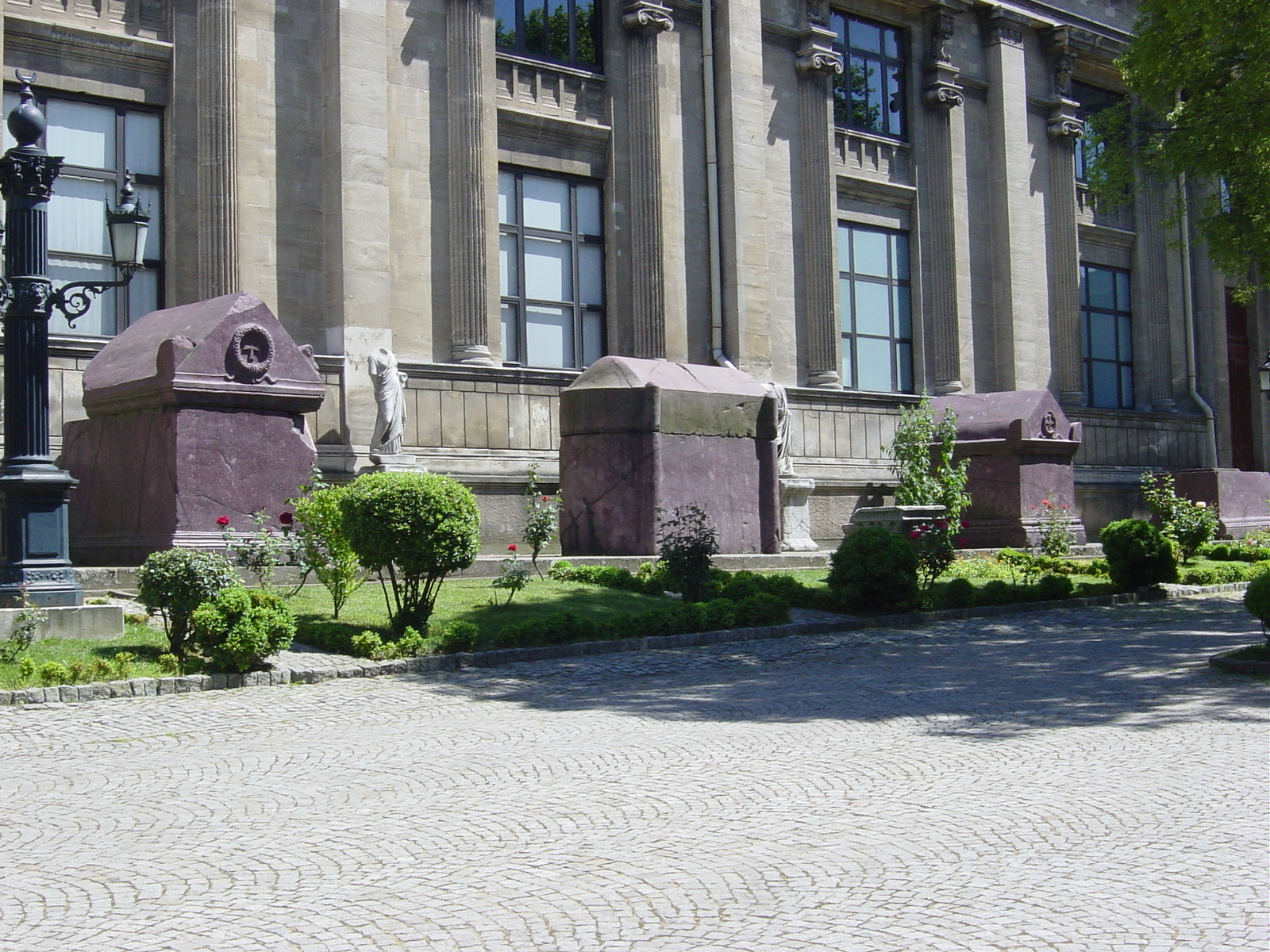
Empty porphyry sarcophagi of Eastern Roman (Byzantine) emperors, once housed in the Church of the Holy Apostles, displayed outside the Istanbul Archaeology Museums

This is a list of the burial places of ancient Roman, and later Eastern Roman (or Byzantine), emperors and their family members.

Early imperial figures were cremated. Inhumations became more common in the second century, though occasional imperial cremations are still recorded until the 4th century. Hadrian (r. 117–138) may have been the first emperor to be inhumed and not cremated, though the sources are unclear. Septimius Severus (r. 193–211) was cremated; his son Geta (r. 211) appears to have been inhumed whereas his other son Caracalla (r. 211–217) was also cremated. In the later Christian empire, cremation became viewed as a pagan practice and the dead were normally inhumed. The resting places for many emperors, particularly those during the Crisis of the Third Century (235–285), remain unknown. Several emperors were not buried at all, having been killed in battle or subjected to damnatio memoriae.

The list includes all reigning emperors, whether their burials are known or not. Family members of the emperors are also included in the list, though only if their burial sites are known or if there has been discussion on the subject. Non-emperors are arranged temporaly (if possible), listed beneath the respective emperors. Emperors are marked with bold text and distinct background color in the list.

== Extant remains ==
The majority of imperial burial sites have been damaged over the centuries, either deliberately or by accident. The following figures either have known burial sites, where their remains can still be found, or have been discovered in modern times:

- (Unknown name) Mother of Maximinus Daza and sister of Galerius (d. early 4th century): buried in the Mausoleum at Šarkamen. The mausoleum was excavated in 1996 and a small amount of ashes and human bones, identified as those of Maximinus Daza's mother, were discovered.
- Helena, mother of Constantine the Great (d. c. 330): buried in the Mausoleum of Helena in Rome. Her remains were stolen in the 9th century and taken to Germany, but eventually retrieved and transferred to Santa Maria in Ara Coeli in Rome, where they are still housed as relics.
- Constantina, daughter of Constantine the Great (d. 354): buried in the Mausoleum of Constantina in Rome. Constantina's sarcophagus was removed to the Vatican in the 18th century but her remains were turned into relics, which are still exhibited at the central altar in the mausoleum (now the Santa Costanza church).
- Emperor Alexios IV of Trebizond, emperor of Trebizond 1417–1429 (d. 1429): buried in the Panagia Chrysokephalos Church in Trebizond. The only surviving imperial tomb in the Chrysokephalos. The church structure was destroyed in 1919, but Alexios IV's remains were given to the Pontic community in Greece and later reburied in the New Soumela monastery in the village of Kastania, near Veria in northern Greece.
- Sophia Palaiologina, granddaughter of Manuel II Palaiologos (d. 1503): buried in the Cathedral of the Archangel in Moscow.

=== Unverified ===
The following figures have reportedly had their remains discovered in modern times, but no studies have confirmed the identification:

- Empress Theodora, wife of Theophilos and regent for Michael III (d. c. 867): buried in the Monastery of Gastria in Constantinople. Local tradition in Corfu claims that Theodora's remains were taken to Corfu's Cathedral of Panagia Spilaiotissa after the fall of Constantinople. Her purported relics are processed through Corfu once a year.
- Emperor Andronikos II Palaiologos, emperor 1282–1328 (d. 1332): buried in the Lips Monastery in Constantinople. Several coffins were discovered during an examination of the Lips Monastery in the early 20th century. Theodore Makridi identified an intact tomb discovered at this time as the tomb of Andronikos II. Marinis (2009) considers this identification to be without evidence but Melvani (2018) considers it reasonable.
- Empress Helena Dragaš, wife of Manuel II Palaiologos (d. 1450): buried in the Monastery of the Pantokrator in Constantinople. The Saint Patapios Monastery in Loutraki, Greece claims that Helena's remains were moved there after the fall of Constantinople, and keeps her purported skull as a holy relic.

=== Remains lost in modern times ===
- In the 15th and 16th centuries, excavations of the Mausoleum of Honorius yielded the remains of five individuals, identified as empresses Maria and Thermantia (wives of Honorius), an adult and an infant (probably Galla Placidia and her young son Theodosius), and a "Christian prince" (possibly one of the last western Roman emperors). Golden objects found with these burials were melted down and no record was kept of the dispersal of the other precious objects, or what happened to the remains. It is possible the remains are buried in one of "poliandri" (ossuaries) built to house the bodies found during the construction of the new basilica of Saint Peter (Torrigio, "Le Sacre Grotte Vaticane", Rome 1639).
- Empress Anna of Hohenstaufen, wife of John III Doukas Vatatzes (d. 1307) was buried in Iglesia San Juan del Hospital in Valencia, Spain. The church was heavily damaged in the Spanish Civil War (1936–1939). Anna's remains were reportedly destroyed or scattered around the site and her skull was for a time used as an ornament on the front of a car. The rebuilt church has a restored sepulchre for Anna, which does not contain any remains.

== Principate (27 BC – AD 285) ==
=== Julio-Claudian dynasty (27 BC – AD 68) ===
Person	Death	Tomb	Comments
Augustus	14	Mausoleum of Augustus (Rome) (destroyed) (Note: The destruction of the tombs in the Mausoleum of Augustus, and scattering of the ashes of the emperors buried there, is traditionally placed during the Visigothic sack of Rome (410).)	
Marcellus	23 BC	Mausoleum of Augustus (Rome) (destroyed)	
Marcus Vipsanius Agrippa	12 BC	Mausoleum of Augustus (Rome) (destroyed)	Agrippa had built a tomb for himself but Augustus had his remains placed in the Mausoleum of Augustus.
Octavia the Younger	11 BC	Mausoleum of Augustus (Rome) (destroyed)	
Nero Claudius Drusus	9 BC	Mausoleum of Augustus (Rome) (destroyed)	
Livia (empress)	29	Mausoleum of Augustus (Rome) (destroyed)	
Lucius Caesar	2	Mausoleum of Augustus (Rome) (destroyed)	
Gaius Caesar	4	Mausoleum of Augustus (Rome) (destroyed)	
Tiberius	37	Mausoleum of Augustus (Rome) (destroyed)	
Germanicus	19	Mausoleum of Augustus (Rome) (destroyed)	
Drusus Julius Caesar	23	Mausoleum of Augustus (probably) (Rome) (destroyed)	
Livilla	31	A tomb near the Mausoleum of Augustus (Rome) (lost)	
Nero Julius Caesar	31	Mausoleum of Augustus (Rome) (destroyed)	
Drusus Caesar	33	Mausoleum of Augustus (Rome) (destroyed)	
Agrippina the Elder	33	Mausoleum of Augustus (Rome) (destroyed)	
Julia Drusilla	38	Mausoleum of Augustus (Rome) (destroyed)	
Tiberius Gemellus	~38	A tomb near the Mausoleum of Augustus (Rome) (lost)	Buried in the same place as Livilla.
Caligula	41	Unknown location	After Caligula's assassination, his body was hastily cremated in the Lamian Gardens and buried under shallow turf by his sisters. After their return from exile, Caligula's sisters reportedly exhumed the ashes and placed them in a tomb. It has been suggested that the ashes were placed in the Mausoleum of Augustus, though this cannot be confirmed.
Claudius	54	Mausoleum of Augustus (probably) (Rome) (destroyed)	
Messalina (empress)	48	Unknown location	Messalina was subjected to damnatio memoriae. What happened to her body after her death is not recorded.
Britannicus	55	Mausoleum of Augustus (Rome) (destroyed)	
Agrippina the Younger (empress)	59	Tomb of Agrippina the Younger (Misenum) (moved?) Mausoleum of Augustus (?) (Rome) (destroyed)	Agrippina's household gave her a modest tomb in Misenum. She may have later been moved to the Mausoleum of Augustus.
Nero	68	Mausoleum of the Domitii Ahenobarbi (Rome) (unknown fate)	Nero's ashes were placed in a porphyry urn beneath the marble altar in the Mausoleum of the Domitii Ahenobarbi, located on the Pincian Hill in Rome. In 1099, the Church of Santa Maria del Popolo was built on Nero's purported burial site by Pope Paschal II.
Claudia Octavia (empress)	62	Mausoleum of Augustus (?) (Rome) (destroyed)	
Claudia Augusta	63	Mausoleum of Augustus (probably) (Rome) (destroyed)	
Poppaea Sabina (empress)	65	Tomb of the Julii (Rome) (unknown fate)	Poppaea's ashes were interred in the "Tomb of the Julii" in the Campus Martius. This tomb may also have contained the ashes of Julius Caesar and Caesar's daughter Julia. She is sometimes alternatively stated to have been buried in the Mausoleum of Augustus.

=== Year of the Four Emperors (68–69) ===
Person	Death	Tomb	Comments
Galba	69	Tomb of Galba (Rome) (lost)	Galba was buried in a tomb in his private gardens in Rome, located somewhere along the Via Aurelia.
Otho	69	Tomb of Otho (Brixellum) (lost)	Otho was buried in a modest tomb in Brixellum (modern-day Brescello), near the Po river.
Vitellius	69	No burial	Vitellius's body was mutilated and thrown in the Tiber river. First emperor whose corpse was publicly desecrated.

=== Flavian dynasty (69–96) ===
Person	Death	Tomb	Comments
Vespasian	79	Mausoleum of Augustus (Rome) (moved) Temple of the gens Flavia (Rome) (lost) (Note: The precise location, appearance, and date of destruction of the Temple of the gens Flavia is unknown.)	Vespasian was originally buried in the Mausoleum of Augustus. His ashes were later brought to the Temple of the gens Flavia by Domitian.
Domitilla the Elder	??	Mausoleum of Augustus (?) (Rome) (destroyed)	The Domitillas, Vespasian's wife and daughter, died before he became emperor. A later inscription places their remains either near or in the Mausoleum of Augustus.
Domitilla the Younger	~66	Mausoleum of Augustus (?) (Rome) (destroyed)	The Domitillas, Vespasian's wife and daughter, died before he became emperor. A later inscription places their remains either near or in the Mausoleum of Augustus.
Titus	81	Mausoleum of Augustus (?) (Rome) (moved) Temple of the gens Flavia (Rome) (lost)	Titus's original burial place is unclear, though might have been in the Mausoleum of Augustus. His ashes were later brought to the Temple of the gens Flavia by Domitian.
Julia Flavia	91	Temple of the gens Flavia (Rome) (lost)	
Domitian	96	Temple of the gens Flavia (Rome) (lost)	Domitian's ashes were secretly interred in the Temple of the gens Flavia by his nurse Phyllis, mixed by the ashes of his niece Julia Flavia.

=== Nerva–Antonine dynasty (96–192) ===
Person	Death	Tomb	Comments
Nerva	98	Mausoleum of Augustus (Rome) (destroyed)	Last person to be buried in the Mausoleum of Augustus.
Trajan	117	Trajan's Column (Rome) (unknown fate)	Trajan's ashes were interred in a burial urn in a small chamber in the base of Trajan's Column. The burial urn and the platform on which it stood are now lost.
Pompeia Plotina (empress)	~122	Trajan's Column (?) (Rome) (unknown fate)	The platform where Trajan's burial urn was located was large enough to hold two burial urns. The urn of Plotina, Trajan's wife, was presumably placed next to her husband's.
Hadrian	138	Mausoleum of Hadrian (Rome) (destroyed) (Note: The destruction of the tombs in the Mausoleum of Hadrian, and scattering of the ashes of the emperors buried there, is traditionally placed during the Visigothic sack of Rome (410).)	Hadrian was initially buried at Puteoli on an estate that had once belonged to Cicero, since his planned mausoleum was unfinished. Hadrian's ashes were interred in his mausoleum by his successor, Antoninus Pius, in 140. According to later tradition, Hadrian's sarcophagus was reused for the burial of Pope Innocent II in 1143 and destroyed in a fire in the 14th century.
Vibia Sabina (empress)	~137	Mausoleum of Hadrian (Rome) (destroyed)	
Lucius Aelius Caesar	138	Mausoleum of Hadrian (probably) (Rome) (destroyed)	
Antoninus Pius	161	Mausoleum of Hadrian (Rome) (destroyed)	
Aurelia Fadilla (Note: Daughter of Antoninus Pius)	135	Mausoleum of Hadrian (Rome) (destroyed)	
Faustina the Elder (empress)	140	Mausoleum of Hadrian (Rome) (destroyed)	
Aurelius Fulvus Antoninus (Note: Son of Antoninus Pius)	??	Mausoleum of Hadrian (Rome) (destroyed)	
Galerius Aurelius Antoninus	??	Mausoleum of Hadrian (Rome) (destroyed)	
Lucius Verus	169	Mausoleum of Hadrian (Rome) (destroyed)	
Marcus Aurelius	180	Mausoleum of Hadrian (Rome) (destroyed)	
Aelius Aurelius (Note: Son of Marcus Aurelius)	149	Mausoleum of Hadrian (Rome) (destroyed)	
Aurelius Antoninus	149	Mausoleum of Hadrian (Rome) (destroyed)	
Domitia Faustina (Note: Daughter of Marcus Aurelius)	151	Mausoleum of Hadrian (Rome) (destroyed)	
Faustina the Younger (empress)	~176	Mausoleum of Hadrian (probably) (Rome) (destroyed)	
Commodus	192	Mausoleum of Hadrian (Rome) (destroyed)	

=== Year of the Five Emperors (193) ===
Person	Death	Tomb	Comments
Pertinax	193	Tomb of Pertinax (Rome) (moved) Mausoleum of Hadrian (probably) (Rome) (destroyed)	Pertinax was quietly buried with "all honor" in the "tomb of his wife's grandfather" under Didius Julianus. Pertinax was later given an honorary state funeral by Septimius Severus, probably being reburied in the Mausoleum of Hadrian.
Didius Julianus	193	Tomb of Salvius Julianus (Rome) (lost)	Didius Julianus was buried in his great-grandfather's tomb by the fifth milestone on the Via Labicana.

=== Severan dynasty (193–235) ===
Person	Death	Tomb	Comments
Septimius Severus	211	Mausoleum of Hadrian (Rome) (destroyed)	
Julia Domna (empress)	217	Mausoleum of Hadrian (Rome) (destroyed)	
Geta	211	Mausoleum of Hadrian (Rome) (destroyed)	Initially buried elsewhere in Rome but later transferred to the Mausoleum of Hadrian.
Caracalla	217	Mausoleum of Hadrian (Rome) (destroyed)	Festus claims that Caracalla was buried at the site of his death, between Edessa and Harran, but all other ancient authors place his burial in the Mausoleum of Hadrian. Caracalla was the last emperor to be buried in the Mausoleum of Hadrian.
Macrinus	218	Unknown location	Macrinus was probably buried in a simple tomb at the site of his death.
Diadumenian	218		
Elagabalus	222	No burial	Elagabalus's corpse was thrown in the Tiber river.
Severus Alexander	235	Mausoleum of Severus Alexander (Rome) (lost)	Severus Alexander was buried in "a large tomb" in Rome. His mausoleum has traditionally been identified as the Monte del Grano in Rome.

=== Crisis of the Third Century (235–285) ===
Person	Death	Tomb	Comments
Maximinus I "Thrax"	238	No burial	Maximinus Thrax's severed head was burnt in the Campus Martius and the rest of the body was cast into running water.
Gordian I	238	Unknown location	
Gordian II	238	No burial	Killed in battle, body not recovered.
Pupienus	238	Unknown location	
Balbinus	238	Tomb of Balbinus (?) (Rome) (unknown fate)	The marble sarcophagus of Balbinus and his wife (whose name is not recorded) was discovered in the early 20th century in fragments near the Via Appia in Rome, in the Catacombs of Praetextatus. The sarcophagus may not actually have been used for the briefly ruling Balbinus, but instead for some other prominent Roman.
Wife of Balbinus (empress?)	??	Tomb of Balbinus (?) (Rome) (unknown fate)	The marble sarcophagus of Balbinus and his wife (whose name is not recorded) was discovered in the early 20th century in fragments near the Via Appia in Rome, in the Catacombs of Praetextatus. The sarcophagus may not actually have been used for the briefly ruling Balbinus, but instead for some other prominent Roman.
Gordian III	244	Mausoleum of Gordian III (?) (Zaitha) (lost)	Gordian III was killed by his troops in northern Mesopotamia. A monument was erected for the emperor at Zaitha, close to Circesium. The sources disagree if Gordian's remains were placed in the monument. Eutropius and Festus state that Gordian's remains were "sent back to Rome". The Epitome de Caesaribus states that Gordian was buried in the monument, which is also implied by the Historia Augusta. According to Ammianus Marcellinus, the later emperor Julian visited the monument and referred to it as Gordian's tomb.
Philip I (the Arab)	249	Unknown location	
Philip II (the Younger)	249		
Decius	251	No burial	Killed in battle, body not recovered.
Herennius Etruscus	251	No burial	Killed in battle, body not recovered.
Trebonianus Gallus	253	Unknown location	
Hostilian	251	Unknown location	
Volusianus	253		
Aemilianus	253	Unknown location	
Silbannacus	??		
Valerian	??	No burial	Valerian was captured in battle by the Sasanian Empire and died in captivity. Valerian's body was flayed and his skin was stuffed with straw and kept as a trophy in a temple.
Licinius Valerianus	268	A tomb in Mediolanum (lost)	According to the Historia Augusta, Licinius Valerianus was buried in a tomb in Mediolanum.
Gallienus	268	Mausoleum of Gallienus (south of Rome) (unknown fate)	The Anonymus Valesianus places the Mausoleum of Gallienus "eight miles" from Rome. The Epitome de Caesaribus specifies that the mausoleum was located on the Via Appia, nine miles from Rome. Ruins of a circular mausoleum have been found just before the ninth milestone of the Via Appia, south of Rome, traditionally identified as Gallienus's mausoleum. The ruins have only been partially excavated. Fragments of a porphyry sarcophagus have been found at the site, supporting it as an imperial tomb. It has alternatively been suggested that Gallienus was buried near Milan, but this idea has no evidence.
Saloninus	260		
Claudius II (Gothicus)	270	Unknown location	
Quintillus	270	Unknown location	
Aurelian	275	Tomb of Aurelian (Caenophrurium) (lost)	Aurelian was buried in a tomb at the site of his death, in Caenophrurium.
Tacitus	276	Unknown location	A cenotaph was erected for Tacitus at Interamna.
Florianus	276	Unknown location	A cenotaph was erected for Florianus at Interamna.
Probus	282	Tomb of Probus (Sirmium) (lost)	Probus was buried in a tomb at the site of his death, in Sirmium.
Carus	283		
Carinus	285	Unknown location	Carinus was probably buried in a simple tomb at the site of his death.
Numerian	284	Unknown location	

== Dominate (285–476) ==
=== Tetrarchy (284–324) ===
Person	Death	Tomb	Comments
Diocletian	~311	Diocletian's Palace, Mausoleum of Diocletian (Spalatum) (destroyed)	Diocletian was buried in a mausoleum in his palace in modern-day Split, Croatia. Diocletian's tomb remained undisturbed until the 7th century, when the mausoleum was converted to a church. During the conversion, the "idols" in the mausoleum were cast out (presumably including Diocletian's sarcophagus and remains).
Prisca (empress)	~315	No burial	Killed in Thessaloniki by Licinius, after which her body was thrown in the sea.
Maximian	310	Mausoleum of Maximian (?) (Mediolanum) (unknown fate) (Note: The mausoleum that probably belonged to Maximian was converted to a monastery at an unknown date. The mausoleum building was razed to the ground in the 16th century, replaced with a new church building.)	Maximian's burial place is unrecorded in the sources. An 11th-century source claims his grave and body were discovered at Marseille in 1047 and cast into the sea by an archbishop, but this is unlikely and has been rejected by most scholars. Maximian was buried in a porphyry sarcophagus according to Ambrose, suggesting that he was given an imperial burial in the western capital of his time (Mediolanum). The site of the burial was probably a 4th-century mausoleum that is now the Monastery of San Vittore al Corpo, similar to other imperial mausolea and dated to Maximian's time.
Eutropia (empress)	??	Mausoleum of Maximian (?) (Mediolanum) (unknown fate)	Possibly buried with her husband, Maximian.
Galerius	311	Felix Romuliana, Mausoleum of Galerius (modern-day Gamzigrad) (unknown fate)	Galerius's mausoleum, "Mausoleum I" at Felix Romuliana, was discovered and excavated in the late 20th century. The chamber that once housed Galerius's sarcophagus or urn was discovered during the excavations. Galerius's burial site is sometimes identified as the Arch of Galerius and Rotunda in Thessaloniki, but contemporary literary sources clearly place his burial at Romuliana.
Romula (Note: Mother of Galerius)	??	Felix Romuliana, Mausoleum of Romula (modern-day Gamzigrad) (unknown fate)	Romula's mausoleum, "Mausoleum II" at Felix Romuliana, was discovered and excavated in the late 20th century. The mausoleum is in a very poor state of preservation.
Galeria Valeria (empress)	~315	No burial	Galeria Valeria was killed with her mother (Prisca) in Thessaloniki by Licinius. Her body was also thrown in the sea.
Constantius I Chlorus	306	Unknown location	Constantius Chlorus's burial is mentioned briefly only by Philostorgius, who states that he was buried shortly after his death by his son (Constantine the Great). He may have been buried in Eboracum, since this is where he died and where Constantine was proclaimed as emperor, or perhaps near Trier. Medieval legends place his burial at Caernarfon in Wales, though this is unlikely.
Severus II	307	Mausoleum of Gallienus (south of Rome) (unknown fate)	Buried in the Mausoleum of Gallienus according to the Anonymus Valesianus. The Anonymus Valesianus places the mausoleum "eight miles" from Rome. The Epitome de Caesaribus specifies that the mausoleum was located on the Via Appia, nine miles from Rome. Ruins of a circular mausoleum have been found just before the ninth milestone of the Via Appia, south of Rome, traditionally identified as Gallienus's mausoleum. The ruins have only been partially excavated. Fragments of a porphyry sarcophagus have been found at the site, supporting it as an imperial tomb.
Maxentius	312	Unknown location	Maxentius's corpse was beheaded and his head was sent to Africa.
Domitius Alexander	310		
Valerius Romulus	309	Mausoleum of Maxentius (Rome) (unknown fate)	Maxentius began constructing a family mausoleum shortly after his accession, though he did not have time to complete it during his reign. The only known burial at the site was Maxentius's young son, Valerius Romulus. The mausoleum has either been worn down naturally over the centuries, or was perhaps destroyed shortly after Maxentius's defeat.
Licinius	325	Unknown location	Licinius was murdered in Thessaloniki and was probably buried in a simple tomb at the site of his death.
Maximinus II Daza	313	Mausoleum of Maximinus Daza (Tarsus) (lost)	Maximinus Daza's tomb was located in Tarsus, "in a suburb" or "just outside the city". It was to the north of the city, close to the Berdan River.
Mother of Maximinus II (Note: Also a sister of Galerius)	??	Mausoleum at Šarkamen (modern-day Šarkamen)	A mausoleum near Šarkamen was excavated in 1996 and identified as an imperial tomb from the time of the Tetrarchy. Precious goods were found during the excavations, including a woman's jewelry. The excavators identified the buried as the mother of Maximinus II Daza (who was also a sister of Galerius), partially because the similarity of the tomb to that of Galerius's mother. A small amount of ashes and human bones were found during the excavations.
Valerius Valens	317		
Martinian	325		

=== Constantinian dynasty (306–364) ===
Person	Death	Tomb	Comments
Constantine I (the Great)	337	Church of the Holy Apostles, Mausoleum of Constantine (Constantinople) (destroyed) (Note: The tombs of the Church of the Holy Apostles were plundered by Alexios III Angelos in 1197 to raise funds, by the crusaders of the Fourth Crusade during the sack of Constantinople (1204), and by the Ottomans after the fall of Constantinople (1453). After 1453, the church, being a symbol of Christianity and the Byzantine rulers, was demolished to make room for the Fatih Mosque. The emptied imperial sarcophagi were destroyed or scattered throughout the city.)	Buried in a porphyry sarcophagus.
Crispus	326	Unknown location	Crispus was either put to death or committed suicide, by order of his father. It has been suggested that his remains were transferred to the Church of the Holy Apostles in Constantinople, but this is unlikely on account of how he died.
Fausta (empress)	326	Church of the Holy Apostles, Mausoleum of Constantine (?) (Constantinople) (destroyed)	Fausta was put to death by Constantine and certainly not given an imperial funeral. Several later sources state that she was nonetheless buried in Constantine's sarcophagus. Her remains may have been reburied with Constantine's on the instigation of her son Constantius II. During the sack of Constantinople (1204), Venetians opened Constantine's tomb and took remains they believed to be Helena's relics to Venice. The stolen remains may in actuality have been Fausta.
Helena	330	Mausoleum of Helena (Rome) (moved) Relics moved to Santa Maria in Ara Coeli (Rome)	Helena was buried in a mausoleum built for her in Rome. Eusebius wrote that she was buried in the "imperial city", which later Byzantine writers misinterpreted as Constantinople. This led to a tradition that she was buried in the Church of the Holy Apostles, in the same sarcophagus as her son, repeated in many medieval sources. The church was not completed until after Helena's death and there is no evidence that her body was transferred there. Helena's remains were stolen in the 9th century and taken to Germany. The remains were eventually retrieved and transferred to Santa Maria in Ara Coeli, where they are still housed as relics. Helena's porphyry sarcophagus was repurposed as the sarcophagus of Pope Anastasius IV in the 12th century, moved to the Archbasilica of Saint John Lateran.
Julius Constantius	337	Unknown location	The tomb of Julius Constantius is mentioned by Julian, though he does not give its location.
Constantina	354	Mausoleum of Constantina (Rome)	Constantina's mausoleum was near a villa she had lived in, as well as a site of veneration for Saint Agnes. Constantina's sarcophagus was moved to the Vatican in the 18th century and is now exhibited at the Vatican Museums. Her remains were turned into relics, exhibited at a central altar in the mausoleum (now the Santa Costanza church).
Constantius Gallus	354	Unknown location	Gallus's burial site is unknown. Constantius II did not allow him "to share the tombs of his ancestors".
Constantine II	340	No burial	Constantine II was killed in battle against his brother Constans. His body was thrown in the Alsa river, near Aquileia.
Constans	350	Roman villa of Centcelles (?) (Constantí, Spain) (unknown fate)	Constans was murdered in southern Gaul. The only ancient reference to Constans's burial is a letter by Athanasius mentioning Constans's tomb but not its location. The Roman villa of Centcelles is a 4th-century villa and mausoleum, converted to a church in the 12th century. Helmut Schlunk identified a funerary portrait in the mausoleum as Constans, and artwork at the site has been suggested to depict scenes relating to his life and time period. Art depicts a figure wearing purple (i.e. belonging to the imperial family) and is from the time around Constans's death. The identification has been disputed but remains sound in light of archaeological evidence. A porphyry sarcophagus later used for the tomb of Peter III of Aragon in the 13th century may have been taken from Centcelles.
Constantius II	361	Church of the Holy Apostles, Mausoleum of Constantine (Constantinople) (destroyed)	Buried in a porphyry sarcophagus.
Eusebia (empress)	~360	Church of the Holy Apostles, Mausoleum of Constantine (Constantinople) (destroyed)	Eusebia was buried with her husband, Constantius II, in the same sarcophagus.
Magnentius	353		
Vetranio	~356		
Nepotianus	350		
Julian	363	Mausoleum of Julian (Tarsus) (moved) Church of the Holy Apostles, northern stoa (Constantinople) (destroyed)	Julian was per his wishes originally buried in a mausoleum in Tarsus, across the road from that of Maximinus Daza. At a later time, perhaps before the end of the 4th century, Julian's remains were transferred to the Church of the Holy Apostles in Constantinople and his original mausoleum was demolished. Julian's remains were placed in a porphyry sarcophagus, located next to the sarcophagus of Jovian.
Helena (empress)	360	Mausoleum of Constantina (Rome) (unknown fate)	Helena was buried in her sister Constantina's mausoleum. Some sources report that her remains were later moved to the Church of the Holy Apostles in Constantinople, though this is uncertain. In addition to Constantina's sarcophagus, a second sarcophagus (believed to be Helena's) was moved from the mausoleum to the Vatican in the 18th century. This sarcophagus is now in St. Peter's Basilica.
Jovian	364	Church of the Holy Apostles, northern stoa (Constantinople) (destroyed)	Buried in a porphyry sarcophagus.
Charito (empress)	??	Church of the Holy Apostles, northern stoa (Constantinople) (destroyed)	Charito was buried with her husband, Jovian, in the same sarcophagus.

=== Valentinianic dynasty (364–392) ===
Person	Death	Tomb	Comments
Valentinian I (the Great)	375	Church of the Holy Apostles (Constantinople) (destroyed)	Buried in a porphyry sarcophagus. The precise location of Valentinian's tomb within the church is unclear.
Marina Severa (empress)	370	Church of the Holy Apostles (Constantinople) (destroyed)	Eusebia was buried with her husband, Valentinian I, in the same sarcophagus, according to the Necrologium. (Note: The Necrologium, Catalogus sepulchrorum etc. are medieval Byzantine sources on the deaths and tombs of the emperors.)
Justina (empress)	388	Imperial Mausoleum (Saint Aquilino) (probably) (Mediolanum) (unknown fate)	Burial unrecorded, but probably in the Valentinianic imperial mausoleum in Mediolanum.
Valens	378	No burial	Valens died at the Battle of Adrianople and his body was never recovered. Jerome claims Valens was buried "where he died" but all other sources agree that his body was not found.
Procopius	366		
Gratian	383	Imperial Mausoleum (Saint Aquilino) (probably) (Mediolanum) (unknown fate)	Gratian was killed at the instigation of Magnus Maximus, who kept his body for political purposes. After Magnus Maximus's fall, Gratian's body was retrieved and buried in an "imperial tomb". The location of his tomb is unclear in contemporary accounts. The later funeral oration for Gratian's brother Valentinian II makes it clear that the two were buried in the same location. It has been suggested that Gratian was buried in the Mausoleum of Maximian, but it is more likely that he was buried in the more recent mausoleum of Saint Aquilino, which may have been built specifically for him.
Constantia (empress)	383	Church of the Holy Apostles (Constantinople) (destroyed)	Constantia was buried in the Church of the Holy Apostles, though the precise location of her tomb within the church is unclear.
Magnus Maximus	388		
Valentinian II	392	Imperial Mausoleum (Saint Aquilino) (probably) (Mediolanum) (unknown fate)	Valentinian was buried in Mediolanum (modern-day Milan), though the sources are unclear on the specific location. He was buried in the same place as his brother. Possibly in the Mausoleum of Maximian but more probably in the more recent mausoleum of Saint Aquilino.
Eugenius	394		

=== Theodosian dynasty (379–457) ===
Person	Death	Tomb	Comments
Theodosius I (the Great)	395	Church of the Holy Apostles, Mausoleum of Constantine (Constantinople) (destroyed)	Buried in a porphyry sarcophagus.
Aelia Flaccilla (empress)	386	Church of the Holy Apostles, Mausoleum of Constantine (Constantinople) (destroyed)	Flaccilla was buried with her husband, Theodosius I, in the same sarcophagus.
Galla (empress)	394	Unknown location	Galla's burial is not recorded in the sources. She may (like Flaccilla) have been buried in the same sarcophagus as her husband, Theodosius I. She may alternatively have been buried in the same mausoleum as her brothers Gratian and Valentinian II, in Mediolanum.
Arcadius (Eastern emperor)	408	Church of the Holy Apostles, southern stoa (Constantinople) (destroyed)	Buried in a porphyry sarcophagus.
Aelia Eudoxia (empress)	404	Church of the Holy Apostles, southern stoa (Constantinople) (destroyed)	Eudoxia was buried in a different sarcophagus than that of her husband (Arcadius).
Honorius (Western emperor)	423	Mausoleum of Honorius (Rome) (unknown fate, destroyed?) (Note: The Mausoleum of Honorius was built besides the Old St. Peter's Basilica. The identity of the occupants of the mausoleum was gradually forgotten over the course of the Middle Ages. The old mausoleum was demolished in 1519 for the construction of the modern St. Peter's Basilica. Three burials were excavated in the 15th and 16th centuries, the others are presumably lost under the modern church. The first burial excavated (in 1458) was an adult and an infant, possibly the bodies of Galla Placidia and her infant son Theodosius (Theodosius is the only infant recorded to have been buried in the mausoleum). The second burial was that of a "Christian prince" (perhaps an emperor), in 1519. The last burial, excavated in 1544, was a sarcophagus with the bodies of Maria and Thermantia, Honorius's empresses. The golden objects found with the burials were melted down and no record was kept of the dispersal of the other precious objects or the bodies.)	Honorius was buried in his own purpose-built mausoleum in Rome, per numerous sources. Local tradition in Ravenna places his burial in the Mausoleum of Galla Placidia in Ravenna, due to the incorrect belief that Galla Placidia was buried there, but this has no factual basis.
Maria (empress)	407	Mausoleum of Honorius (Rome) (excavated, unknown fate)	Maria and Thermantia were buried together in a marble sarcophagus. The sarcophagus was excavated in 1544, with the two bodies and many precious objects inside. The golden objects found were melted down; no record was kept of the dispersal of the other objects or the bodies.
Thermantia (empress)	415	Mausoleum of Honorius (Rome) (excavated, unknown fate)	Maria and Thermantia were buried together in a marble sarcophagus. The sarcophagus was excavated in 1544, with the two bodies and many precious objects inside. The golden objects found were melted down; no record was kept of the dispersal of the other objects or the bodies.
Galla Placidia (empress)	450	Mausoleum of Honorius (probably) (Rome) (unknown fate, possibly excavated)	There are various traditions concerning Galla Placidia's burial, including that she was buried in the Valentinianic mausoleum in Mediolanum or in a structure now called the Mausoleum of Galla Placidia in Ravenna. The earliest source placing Galla Placidia in the Ravenna mausoleum is from the 9th century. Galla Placidia was most likely buried in the Mausoleum of Honorius in Rome; her son Theodosius was reburied there shortly before her death and it would have been a burial site befitting her rank as augusta. A sarcophagus possibly containing the bodies of Galla Placidia and Theodosius was excavated in 1458, The golden objects found in the sarcophagus were melted down and no record was kept of the dispersal of the other precious objects or the bodies.
Theodosius (Note: Son of Galla Placidia and Athaulf)	415	A church in Barcelona (Barcelona) (moved) Mausoleum of Honorius (Rome) (unknown fate, possibly excavated)	Theodosius died as a child in 415 and buried in a church in Barcelona. His remains were transferred to the Mausoleum of Honorius in 450. A sarcophagus possibly containing the bodies of Galla Placidia and Theodosius was excavated in 1458, The golden objects found in the sarcophagus were melted down and no record was kept of the dispersal of the other precious objects or the bodies.
Constantine III (Western emperor)	411		
Theodosius II (Eastern emperor)	450	Church of the Holy Apostles, southern stoa (Constantinople) (destroyed)	Buried in a porphyry sarcophagus.
Aelia Eudocia (empress)	460	Church of Saint Stephen (Jerusalem) (destroyed) (Note: The original Church of Saint Stephen was destroyed by the Sasanian Empire in 614. The modern St. Stephen's Basilica stands at the same site.)	Aelia Eudocia was buried in the same cave where Saint Stephen was believed to have been buried. Next to nothing is known of her tomb.
Priscus Attalus (Western emperor)	??		
Constantius III (Western emperor)	421	Mausoleum of Honorius (probably) (Rome) (unknown fate, destroyed?)	Constantius III was probably buried in Honorius's imperial mausoleum in Rome, where his wife (Galla Placidia) was most likely buried. Local tradition in Ravenna places his burial in the Mausoleum of Galla Placidia in Ravenna, due to the incorrect belief that Galla Placidia was buried there, but this has no factual basis.
Joannes (Western emperor)	425		
Valentinian III (Western emperor)	455	Mausoleum of Honorius (probably) (Rome) (unknown fate, destroyed?)	The burial of Valentinian III is not recorded, but he was most likely buried in Honorius's imperial mausoleum in Rome. Local tradition in Ravenna places his burial in the Mausoleum of Galla Placidia in Ravenna, due to the incorrect belief that Galla Placidia was buried there, but this has no factual basis.
Marcian (Eastern emperor)	457	Church of the Holy Apostles, Mausoleum of Constantine (Constantinople) (destroyed)	Buried in a porphyry sarcophagus.
Pulcheria (empress)	453	Church of the Holy Apostles, Mausoleum of Constantine (Constantinople) (destroyed)	Pulcheria was buried with her husband, Marcian, in the same sarcophagus.

=== Last western emperors (395–476) ===
Person	Death	Tomb	Comments
Petronius Maximus	455	No burial	The body of Petronius Maximus was cut into pieces and thrown in the Tiber river.
Avitus	~457	Shrine of St. Julian (Brivas, France) (unknown fate)	Avitus was buried in the church of St. Julian at Brivatensis Vicus (modern-day Brioude), "at the foot of the martyr". The martyrium of St. Julian in the church was replaced or covered with a larger structure in 469.
Majorian	461	Tomb of Majorian (near Dertona, Italy) (lost)	Majorian was buried in a humble tomb near Dertona, Italy, at the site of his death. The modern-day city of Tortona has a structure claimed by local tradition to be the "Mausoleum of Majorian". This mausoleum, now part of the city's Church of Saint Matthew, is an authentic ancient structure but dates to the 1st century.
Libius Severus	465	Mausoleum of Honorius (probably) (Rome) (unknown fate, destroyed?)	Burial not mentioned in the sources but probably in the Mausoleum of Honorius.
Anthemius	472	Unknown location	Probably buried in a family tomb or a common grave, most likely in or near Rome. Ricimer did not think Anthemius was "worthy" of an imperial burial.
Olybrius	472	Mausoleum of Honorius (probably) (Rome) (unknown fate, destroyed?)	Burial not mentioned in the sources but probably in the Mausoleum of Honorius.
Glycerius	??	Unknown location	Glycerius was forced to become a bishop in Salona, where he later died. He was likely buried in or near a church there.
Julius Nepos	480	Unknown location	Julius Nepos died near Salona and was probably buried there, in or near a church.
Romulus Augustulus	??	Unknown location	

== Later eastern emperors (457–1453) ==
=== Leonid dynasty (457–518) ===
Person	Death	Tomb	Comments
Leo I	474	Church of the Holy Apostles, Mausoleum of Constantine (Constantinople) (destroyed)	Buried in a sarcophagus of green hieracites stone.
Verina (empress)	484	Church of the Holy Apostles, Mausoleum of Constantine (Constantinople) (destroyed)	Verina was probably buried in the same sarcophagus as her husband, Leo I, as stated by later Byzantine sources. Verina was in rebellion against emperor Zeno at the time of her death and died while being besieged. Her body must have been retrieved at the end of the siege, four years later.
Leo II	474	Church of the Holy Apostles, Mausoleum of Constantine (?) (Constantinople) (destroyed)	The burial of Leo II is not recorded in the sources but he was certainly buried in the Church of the Holy Apostles. He may have been buried in the same sarcophagus as either Leo I or Zeno.
Zeno	491	Church of the Holy Apostles, Mausoleum of Constantine (Constantinople) (destroyed)	Buried in a sarcophagus of Thessalian marble.
Basiliscus	~477	No burial	Basiliscus, his wife Zenonis, and their children were immured in a dry cistern in Limnae and starved to death. Their bodies were left in place.
Zenonis (empress)	~477	No burial	Basiliscus, his wife Zenonis, and their children were immured in a dry cistern in Limnae and starved to death. Their bodies were left in place.
Children of Basiliscus (incl. Marcus)	~477	No burial	Basiliscus, his wife Zenonis, and their children were immured in a dry cistern in Limnae and starved to death. Their bodies were left in place.
Anastasius I (Dicorus)	518	Church of the Holy Apostles, Mausoleum of Constantine (Constantinople) (destroyed)	Buried in a sarcophagus of Aquitainian marble. Some later Byzantine sources mistook his sarcophagus as being made of porphyry.
Ariadne (empress)	515	Church of the Holy Apostles, Mausoleum of Constantine (Constantinople) (destroyed)	Ariadne was buried with her second husband, Anastasius I, in the same sarcophagus.

=== Justinian dynasty (518–602) ===
Person	Death	Tomb	Comments
Justin I	527	Church of Saint Euphemia (Constantinople) (unknown fate)	There is confusion on Justin I and Euphemia's burial in later sources. Several sources claim that they were buried in the Church of the Holy Apostles, though these likely confuse Justin I with Justinian I or Justin II. It seems clear from the source material that Justin I and Euphemia were buried together in a sarcophagus of green Thessalian marble or Proconnesian marble in the convent of Saint Euphemia (also called the Monastery of the Augusta). They were dispossessed of their sarcophagus in the 9th century, when Leo VI had it reused for Michael III, and were reburied in St. Euphemia in a small and narrow coffin of Proconnesian stone that bore the legend "the coffin of Alexander the Domesticus". It is unclear why the former imperial couple were exhumed and placed in Alexander the Domesticus's coffin.
Euphemia (empress)	~523	Church of Saint Euphemia (Constantinople) (unknown fate)	
Justinian I (the Great)	565	Church of the Holy Apostles, Mausoleum of Justinian (Constantinople) (destroyed)	Buried in a sarcophagus of a stone called iritionis, in color somewhere "between Bithynian and Chalcedonian". Justinian's sarcophagus was opened by crusaders during the sack of Constantinople (1204), sources from that time claim it was still uncorrupted after 600 years.
Thedora (empress)	548	Church of the Holy Apostles, Mausoleum of Justinian (Constantinople) (destroyed)	Buried in a sarcophagus of Hierapolitan stone.
Justin II	578	Church of the Holy Apostles, Mausoleum of Justinian (Constantinople) (destroyed)	Buried in a sarcophagus of white Proconnesian marble.
Sophia (empress)	~601	Church of the Holy Apostles, Mausoleum of Justinian (Constantinople) (destroyed)	Buried in a sarcophagus of white Proconnesian marble (a separate sarcophagus from that of her husband Justin II).
Tiberius II Constantine	582	Church of the Holy Apostles (Constantinople) (destroyed)	Tiberius II Constantine was buried in the Church of the Holy Apostles but there are conflicting accounts on his tomb. The Necrologium states that he was buried in a sarcophagus of white Proconnesian marble in the Mausoleum of Constantine. George Kedrenos wrote that he was buried in a green marble sarcophagus, implied to be in the Mausoleum of Justinian.
Ino Anastasia (empress)	593	Church of the Holy Apostles (Constantinople) (destroyed)	Ino Anastasia was buried with her husband, Tiberius II Constantine, in the same sarcophagus.
Maurice	602	Monastery of Saint Mamas (Constantinople) (lost) (Note: The Monastery of Saint Mamas was located in southwestern Constantinople and survived until at least 1399, though no trace of it remains today. The sarcophagi of Maurice and his family may have been repurposed by Romanos I Lekapenos in the 10th century as sarcophagi for his family, in the Myrelaion Monastery.)	It is possible that Maurice being buried in the Monastery of Saint Mamas was pre-arranged and not a consequence of his downfall and execution by Phocas. His wife and sister (who buried him) cannot have been in a position to make elaborate arrangements.
Paul	593	Church of the Holy Apostles (Constantinople) (destroyed)	Paul was buried in the Church of the Holy Apostles, though the precise location within the church is unclear.
Constantina (empress)	~605	Monastery of Saint Mamas (?) (Constantinople) (lost)	Maurice's executed sons were buried with him in the Monastery of Saint Mamas. Maurice's wife Constantina, who survived her husband, was probably later buried in the same building.
Sons of Maurice	602	Monastery of Saint Mamas (Constantinople) (lost)	Maurice's executed sons were buried with him in the Monastery of Saint Mamas. Maurice's wife Constantina, who survived her husband, was probably later buried in the same building.
Phocas	610	Pelagion (Constantinople) (lost)	Phocas's body was burnt in the Forum of the Ox. His ashes are said to have been thrown in a common grave in the Pelagion, a recognized place of burial for executed criminals.
Leontia (empress)	??	Unknown location	Leontia survived the downfall of her husband, Phocas, and was certainly denied an imperial funeral.

=== Heraclian dynasty (610–695, 705–711) ===
Person	Death	Tomb	Comments
Heraclius	641	Church of the Holy Apostles, Mausoleum of Justinian (Constantinople) (destroyed)	Buried in a sarcophagus of white Docimian marble. The Catalogus sepulchrorum describes the material as "white Docimian, onyx" while the Necrologium describes it as "white Proconnesian". The description in the Catalogus is favored as more likely.
Fabia Eudokia (empress)	612	Church of the Holy Apostles, Mausoleum of Justinian (Constantinople) (destroyed)	Buried in a sarcophagus of green Thessalian marble.
Martina (empress)	??	"τò Δεδπoτικoν" monastery (lost)	The monastery where Martina and her son Heraclonas were buried was probably the same monastery to which Theodosia, wife of Leo V, was exiled in the 9th century.
Heraclius Constantine	641	Church of the Holy Apostles, Mausoleum of Justinian (Constantinople) (destroyed)	Buried in a sarcophagus of white Proconnesian marble.
Gregoria (empress)	??	Unknown location	The date of Gregoria's death and the place of her burial is not recorded. Some later sources state that she was buried in the same sarcophagus as her husband, Heraclius Constantine. Although this is possible, these records probably confuse Heraclius Constantine's tomb with the later tomb of Constantine IV and Anastasia.
Heraclonas	??	"τò Δεδπoτικoν" monastery (lost)	The monastery where Martina and Heraclonas were buried was probably the same monastery to which Theodosia, wife of Leo V, was exiled in the 9th century.
Constans II (the Bearded)	668	Monastery of Saint Gregory (Syracuse) (lost)	There is no record of a Monastery of Saint Gregory on Sicily in Italian records. The monastery may have been destroyed at some point during Muslim rule of the island in the 9th–11th centuries.
Fausta (empress)	??	Church of the Holy Apostles, Mausoleum of Justinian (Constantinople) (destroyed)	Buried in a sarcophagus of green Thessalian marble.
Constantine IV (the Younger)	685	Church of the Holy Apostles, Mausoleum of Justinian (Constantinople) (destroyed)	Buried in a sarcophagus of Sagarian marble. The Necrologium incorrectly states that he was buried in a sarcophagus of Thessalian marble.
Anastasia (empress)	??	Church of the Holy Apostles, Mausoleum of Justinian (Constantinople) (destroyed)	Anastasia was buried with her husband, Constantine IV, in the same sarcophagus.
Justinian II	711	No burial	Justinian II was beheaded and his head was sent through the provinces. According to the Necrologium his body was thrown in the sea.
Eudokia (empress)	??	Church of the Holy Apostles, Mausoleum of Justinian (Constantinople) (destroyed)	Buried in a sarcophagus of variegated rose-colored Docimian stone.
Theodora of Khazaria (empress)	??	Unknown location	No tomb is recorded for Theodora.
Tiberius (co-emperor)	711	Kosmas and Damianos Monastery (Constantinople) (lost)	

=== Twenty Years' Anarchy (695–717) ===
Person	Death	Tomb	Comments
Leontius	~706	A church on the island of Prote (?) (lost)	Leontius and Tiberius III were executed by Justinian II. The Necrologium states that the bodies of Leontius and Tiberius III were thrown in the sea but later retrieved and buried in a church on Prote. This report is not recorded in other sources.
Tiberius III	~706	A church on the island of Prote (?) (lost)	Leontius and Tiberius III were executed by Justinian II. The Necrologium states that the bodies of Leontius and Tiberius III were thrown in the sea but later retrieved and buried in a church on Prote. This report is not recorded in other sources.
Philippicus	713	Monastery of Dalmatoi (?) (Constantinople) (lost)	The Necrologium states that Philippicus was buried in the Monastery of Dalmatoi, where Justinian II and Leontius had previously been confined for some time after their depositions. His burial there is not recorded in other sources.
Anastasius II	719	Church of the Holy Apostles, Mausoleum of Justinian (Constantinople) (destroyed)	Anastasius II was executed and beheaded by Leo III, but his burial in the Church of the Holy Apostles was later arranged by his widow Irene. He was buried in a sarcophagus of Sagarian marble.
Irene (Note: Wife of Anastasius II) (empress)	??	Church of the Holy Apostles, Mausoleum of Justinian (Constantinople) (destroyed)	Buried in a sarcophagus of Hierapolitan marble.
Theodosius III	??	Unknown location	The Necrologium and George Kedrenos state that Theodosius III was buried in the Church of Saint Philip, in the old city of Ephesus, near the harbor. Warren Treadgold has questioned this account and suggested that the Theodosius buried in Ephesus was a different Theodosius (perhaps a son of Tiberius III of Theodosius III), who later Byzantine writers assumed had been the emperor.

=== Isaurian dynasty (717–802) ===
Person	Death	Tomb	Comments
Leo III (the Isaurian)	741	Church of the Holy Apostles, Mausoleum of Justinian (Constantinople) (destroyed)	Buried in a sarcophagus of white Proconnesian marble.
Maria (empress)	??	Church of the Holy Apostles, Mausoleum of Justinian (Constantinople) (destroyed)	Maria was buried with her husband, Leo III, in the same sarcophagus.
Irene (Note: Daughter of Leo III)	??	Church of the Holy Apostles, Mausoleum of Justinian (Constantinople) (destroyed)	Irene and Kosmo were buried together in a single sarcophagus.
Kosmo	??	Church of the Holy Apostles, Mausoleum of Justinian (Constantinople) (destroyed)	Irene and Kosmo were buried together in a single sarcophagus.
Constantine V	775	Church of the Holy Apostles, Mausoleum of Justinian (Constantinople) (removed) Not buried	Constantine V was originally buried in a sarcophagus of green Thessalian marble in the Church of the Holy Apostles. Remembered as an "arch-iconoclast", Constantine's sarcophagus was removed from the church by Theodora and Michael III in the 9th century in connection to the Triumph of Orthodoxy (843). Constantine's body was burnt in the Amastrianum and his ashes were scattered in the sea.
Irene (Tzitzak) (empress)	~750	Church of the Holy Apostles, Mausoleum of Justinian (Constantinople) (destroyed)	Irene and Maria were buried in separate tombs from that of their husband, Constantine V. Their remains may have been burnt and removed together with Constantine V's in the 9th century.
Maria (empress)	751	Church of the Holy Apostles, Mausoleum of Justinian (Constantinople) (destroyed)	Irene and Maria were buried in separate tombs from that of their husband, Constantine V. Their remains may have been burnt and removed together with Constantine V's in the 9th century.
Eudokia (empress)	??	Unknown location	There was apparently no imperial tomb for Eudokia.
Christopher, Nikephoros, Niketas, Eudokimos, and Anthimos (Note: Sons of Constantine V)	??	Unknown location	Constantine VI's five uncles were disgraced and blinded. Their dates of death or burial places are not recorded.
Artabasdos	??	Unknown location	Artabasdos and his two sons Nikephoros and Niketas were blinded and paraded in the Hippodrome after their fall from power but their ultimate fate is not recorded. The 9th-century hagiography of Michael Synkellos states that Artabasdos and his family were confined in the Chora Monastery, possibly a later invention.
Anna (empress)	??	Unknown location	Likely not given an imperial burial due to her support for her husband Artabasdos, despite being a daughter of Leo III.
Nikephoros (co-emperor)	??	Unknown location	Artabasdos and his two sons Nikephoros and Niketas were blinded and paraded in the Hippodrome after their fall from power but their ultimate fate is not recorded. The 9th-century hagiography of Michael Synkellos states that Artabasdos and his family were confined in the Chora Monastery, possibly a later invention.
Niketas	??	Unknown location	Artabasdos and his two sons Nikephoros and Niketas were blinded and paraded in the Hippodrome after their fall from power but their ultimate fate is not recorded. The 9th-century hagiography of Michael Synkellos states that Artabasdos and his family were confined in the Chora Monastery, possibly a later invention.
Leo IV (the Khazar)	780	Church of the Holy Apostles, Mausoleum of Justinian (Constantinople) (destroyed)	Buried in a white sarcophagus.
Constantine VI	??	Monastery of the Lady Euphrosyne (Constantinople) (lost)	Constantine VI was buried in a sarcophagus of Bithynian marble in the Monastery of the Lady Euphrosyne in Constantinople. The Necrologium incorrectly reports that he was buried on the island of Prinkipo.
Maria of Amnia (empress)	??	Monastery of the Lady Euphrosyne (Constantinople) (lost)	Maria was buried with her husband, Constantine VI, in the same sarcophagus.
Theodote (empress)	??	Unknown location	The burial of Theodote is not recorded.
Irene (Note: Daughter of Constantine VI)	??	Monastery of the Lady Euphrosyne (Constantinople) (lost)	Irene was buried with her father, in the same sarcophagus.
Leo (Note: Son of Constantine VI)	797	Church of the Holy Apostles (Constantinople) (destroyed)	Leo was buried in the Church of the Holy Apostles, though the precise location of his tomb is not recorded. His remains may have been placed in one of the already occupied Isaurian sarcophagi.
Irene	803	A convent on Prinkipo (moved) Church of the Holy Apostles, Mausoleum of Justinian (Constantinople) (destroyed)	Irene was initially buried in a convent she had founded on the island of Prinkipo. Irene's remains were transferred to the Church of the Holy Apostles by Theodora and Michael III after the Triumph of Orthodoxy (843). Her tomb may have taken the place of the removed tomb of Constantine V.

=== Nikephorian dynasty (802–813) ===
Person	Death	Tomb	Comments
Nikephoros I	811	No burial	Nikephoros I was killed at the Battle of Pliska (811). The Bulgarian ruler Krum had Nikephoros's body burnt and his skull turned into a drinking cup.
Staurakios	812	Monastery of the Holy Trinity (Halki) (unknown fate) (Note: The Staurakion was rebuilt as the Theological School of Halki in 1844 and is today the Halki seminary.)	The monastery in which Staurakios was buried also became known as the "Staurakion" or "House of Staurakios", after the emperor.
Theophano (empress)	??	Monastery of the Holy Trinity (Halki) (unknown fate)	Theophano was buried with her husband, Staurakios, in the same sarcophagus.
Michael I Rangabe	844	A convent on Plate (moved) Monastery of Saint Michael (Satyros, Bithynia) (lost)	Michael I was initially buried on the island of Plate. Michael's son Niketas, who became Patriarch of Constantinople, had Michael's remains transferred to the Monastery of Saint Michael in Satyros, Bithynia. This monastery was located by the shore, directly opposite to the Princes' Islands.
Prokopia (empress)	??	Unknown location	Prokopia's burial is not recorded.
Theophylact (co-emperor)	849	Monastery of Saint Michael (Satyros, Bithynia) (lost)	Theophylact was buried in the same church as his father, Michael I.
Niketas (Ignatios)	877	Monastery of Saint Michael (Satyros, Bithynia) (lost)	Niketas became Patriarch of Constantinople. His body was first placed in Hagia Sophia and was later moved first to Saint Menas by the Bosporus and then to Satyros.
Staurakios (Note: Son of Michael I Rangabe) (co-emperor)	??	A convent on Plate (probably)	Staurakios died before his father, Michael I, and was probably buried on Plate, though no details of his burial are recorded.
Leo V (the Armenian)	820	A convent on Prote (lost)	Leo V's body initially laid exposed in the Hippodrome. Michael II apparently eventually allowed Leo V's wife (Theodosia) and sons to take the body with them to their place of exile (Prote) and bury it there. Leo's sons were mutilated; one son died during the process and was buried together with Leo.

=== Amorian dynasty (820–867) ===
Person	Death	Tomb	Comments
Michael II	829	Church of the Holy Apostles, Mausoleum of Justinian (Constantinople) (destroyed)	All sources agree that Michael II and Thekla were buried in the Church of the Holy Apostles but there is confusion in the sources regarding the details. The Necrologium states that they were buried together, in a white Proconnesian sarcophagus in the Mausoleum of Justinian. Different variants of the Catalogus sepulchrorum place their burial either in the Mausoleum of Justinian or the Mausoleum of Constantine, and either together in a Proconnesian sarcophagus or separately. The most reliable version of the Catalogus states that Michael and Thekla were buried separately in the Mausoleum of Justinian, Michael in a sarcophagus of green Thessalian marble and Thekla in a sarcophagus of Sagarian marble.
Thekla (empress)	~823	Church of the Holy Apostles, Mausoleum of Justinian (Constantinople) (destroyed)	
Euphrosyne (empress)	??	Monastery of the Lady Euphrosyne (Constantinople) (lost)	Euphrosyne was buried with her father Constantine VI (not with her husband Michael II), in the same sarcophagus.
Theophilos	842	Church of the Holy Apostles, Mausoleum of Justinian (Constantinople) (destroyed)	Buried in a sarcophagus of green stone. The Necrologium contradictorily states that his sarcophagus was of Proconnesian marble (which is white) but all variants of the more reliable Catalogus sepulchrorum agree on green.
Theodora (empress)	~867	Monastery of Gastria (Constantinople) (unknown fate) Relics moved to Cathedral of Panagia Spilaiotissa (?) (Corfu)	Theodora was buried in the Monastery of Gastria, alongside several family members. The Monastery of Gastria was converted to a mescit (oratory) shortly after the fall of Constantinople (1453) and is today the Sancaktar Hayrettin Mosque. Local tradition in Corfu claims that Theodora's remains were taken to Corfu's Cathedral of Panagia Spilaiotissa after the fall of Constantinople. Her purported relics are processed through Corfu once a year.
Constantine (co-emperor)	??	Church of the Holy Apostles, Mausoleum of Justinian (Constantinople) (destroyed)	Buried in a sarcophagus of green stone.
Thekla (co-empress)	??	Monastery of Gastria (Constantinople) (unknown fate)	The 10th-century De Ceremoniis states that Thekla, Anastasia, and Pulcheria were buried in the Monastery of Gastria together with their mother Theodora, in the same sarcophagus. The Monastery of Gastria was converted to a mescit (oratory) shortly after the fall of Constantinople (1453) and is today the Sancaktar Hayrettin Mosque.
Anastasia (Note: Daughter of Theophilos)	??	Monastery of Gastria (Constantinople) (unknown fate)	The 10th-century De Ceremoniis states that Thekla, Anastasia, and Pulcheria were buried in the Monastery of Gastria together with their mother Theodora, in the same sarcophagus. The Monastery of Gastria was converted to a mescit (oratory) shortly after the fall of Constantinople (1453) and is today the Sancaktar Hayrettin Mosque.
Pulcheria	??	Monastery of Gastria (Constantinople) (unknown fate)	The 10th-century De Ceremoniis states that Thekla, Anastasia, and Pulcheria were buried in the Monastery of Gastria together with their mother Theodora, in the same sarcophagus. The Monastery of Gastria was converted to a mescit (oratory) shortly after the fall of Constantinople (1453) and is today the Sancaktar Hayrettin Mosque.
Maria	??	Church of the Holy Apostles, Mausoleum of Justinian (Constantinople) (destroyed)	Buried in a sarcophagus of Sagarian stone.
Anna	??	Monastery of the Lady Euphrosyne (Constantinople) (lost)	Buried in the same sarcophagus as Constantine VI.
Michael III	867	Philippikos Monastery (Chrysopolis) (moved) Church of the Holy Apostles, Mausoleum of Constantine (Constantinople) (destroyed)	Michael III was initially buried in the Philippikos Monastery in Chrysopolis. His body was brought to Constantinople by Leo VI and reburied in the Church of the Holy Apostles, in a sarcophagus that had originally housed Justin I and Euphemia.

=== Macedonian dynasty (867–1056) ===
Person	Death	Tomb	Comments
Basil I	886	Church of the Holy Apostles, Mausoleum of Constantine (Constantinople) (destroyed)	Buried in a sarcophagus of Thessalian marble.
Constantine (co-emperor)	879	Church of the Holy Apostles, Mausoleum of Constantine (Constantinople) (destroyed)	
Eudokia Ingerina (empress)	~882	Church of the Holy Apostles, Mausoleum of Constantine (Constantinople) (destroyed)	Eudokia was buried with her husband, Basil I, in the same sarcophagus.
Bardas (Note: Son of Basil I)	??	Church of the Holy Apostles, Mausoleum of Constantine (Constantinople) (destroyed)	
Anastasia, Helena, and Anna (Note: Daughters of Basil I)	??	Monastery of Saint Euphemia (Constantinople) (unknown fate)	
Pankalo (Note: Mother of Basil I)	??	Monastery of Saint Euphemia (Constantinople) (unknown fate)	
Marianos and Symbatios (Note: Brothers of Basil I)	??	Monastery of Saint Euphemia (Constantinople) (unknown fate)	
Leo VI (the Wise)	912	Church of the Holy Apostles, Mausoleum of Constantine (Constantinople) (destroyed)	The material of Leo VI's sarcophagus was evidently difficult to identify. The sarcophagus is variously identified to have been Sagarian, "pneumonousian", or Sagarian "phlegmenousian" ("flame-colored"?).
Eudokia (Note: Daughter of Leo VI)	892	Church of the Holy Apostles, Mausoleum of Constantine (Constantinople) (destroyed)	Buried in the same sarcophagus as her mother, Theophano Martinakia.
Theophano Martinakia (empress)	897	Church of the Holy Apostles, Mausoleum of Constantine (Constantinople) (destroyed)	
Zoe Zaoutzaina (empress)	899	Church of the Holy Apostles, Mausoleum of Constantine (Constantinople) (destroyed)	
Eudokia Baïana (empress)	901	Church of the Holy Apostles, Mausoleum of Constantine (Constantinople) (destroyed)	
Zoe Karbonopsina (empress)	??	Nunnery of Saint Euphemia, Petrion (Constantinople) (unknown fate)	
Basil (Note: Son of Leo VI)	??	Church of the Holy Apostles, Mausoleum of Constantine (Constantinople) (destroyed)	Buried in the same sarcophagus as Bardas, son of Basil I.
Anna and Anna (Note: Daughters of Leo VI)	??	Church of the Holy Apostles, Mausoleum of Constantine (Constantinople) (destroyed)	Buried together in a single sarcophagus, which also housed one of Leo's wives (Theophano, Zoe, or Eudokia).
Alexander	913	Church of the Holy Apostles, Mausoleum of Constantine (Constantinople) (destroyed)	Buried in the same sarcophagus as his parents, Basil I and Eudokia Ingerina.
Constantine VII	959	Church of the Holy Apostles, Mausoleum of Constantine (Constantinople) (destroyed)	Buried in the same sarcophagus as Leo VI. He may have been reburied later in a sarcophagus of his own.
Helena Lekapene (empress)	961	Myrelaion Monastery (Constantinople) (unknown fate)	Buried in the tomb of her father, Romanos I Lekapenos.
Romanos I Lekapenos	948	Myrelaion Monastery (Constantinople) (unknown fate)	
Theodora (empress)	922	Myrelaion Monastery (Constantinople) (unknown fate)	
Christopher Lekapenos (co-emperor)	931	Myrelaion Monastery (Constantinople) (unknown fate)	
Constantine Lekapenos (co-emperor)	??	Myrelaion Monastery (Constantinople) (unknown fate)	
Helena (Note: Wife of Constantine Lekapenos)	??	Myrelaion Monastery (Constantinople) (unknown fate)	Buried with her husband, Constantine Lekapenos.
Romanos II	963	Church of the Holy Apostles, Mausoleum of Constantine (Constantinople) (destroyed)	Buried in a sarcophagus of white stone, with no ornamentation.
Theophano (empress)	??	Church of the Holy Apostles, Mausoleum of Constantine (Constantinople) (destroyed)	
Nikephoros II Phokas	969	Church of the Holy Apostles, Mausoleum of Constantine (Constantinople) (destroyed)	Nikephoros II was murdered and his body was left laying in the snow for 24 hours, before it was buried without ceremony in the Church of the Holy Apostles.
John I Tzimiskes	976	Church of Christ Chalkites (Constantinople) (unknown fate)	The chapel of the Church of Christ Chalkites was still largely intact by the 14th century but fell into ruins during Ottoman times. The Ottomans referred to the ruins of the chapel as "Arslanhane" and used it as a menagerie.
Theodora (empress)	??	Unknown location	There is no record of Theodora's burial.
Basil II	1025	Hebdomon Palace, Church of St. John the Theologian (Constantinople) (moved) Monastery of Christ (Selymbria) (lost)	Basil II was initially buried in the Church of St. John the Theologian at the Hebdomon Palace complex outside the walls of Constantinople. His tomb was plundered by the crusaders of the Fourth Crusade during the sack of Constantinople (1204). Basil's body was discovered during the Nicaean siege of Constantinople (1260), in a corner of the same church with a flute stuck in his mouth. Michael VIII Palaiologos had Basil reburied in the Monastery of Christ in Selymbria. The monastery is attested until 1481 but cannot be identified with any known Byzantine monuments in modern-day Silivri, meaning that no trace of the tomb survives.
Constantine VIII	1028	Church of the Holy Apostles, Mausoleum of Constantine (Constantinople) (destroyed)	Buried in a marble sarcophagus. Last emperor to be buried in the Church of the Holy Apostles. At the time of Constantine VIII's burial there was no space left along the walls of the Mausoleum of Constantine, so his sarcophagus was placed in the center of the room.
Romanos III Argyros	1034	Church of St. Mary Peribleptos (Constantinople) (unknown fate)	
Michael IV (the Paphlagonian)	1041	Monastery of the Holy Anargyroi (Constantinople) (unknown fate)	
Michael V Kalaphates	??		
Zoë Porphyrogenita	1050	Chapel of Christ Antiphonites	
Constantine IX Monomachos	1055	Monastery of Saint George of Mangana (Constantinople) (unknown fate)	The monastery of Saint George of Mangana survived until the fall of Constantinople (1453) but was demolished by the Ottomans to make way for the construction of the Topkapı Palace.
Theodora Porphyrogenita	1056	Nunnery of St Euphemia in Petrion (possibly)	
Michael VI Bringas	~1057		
Isaac I Komnenos	1060		

=== Doukas dynasty (1059–1078) ===
Person	Death	Tomb	Comments
Constantine X Doukas	1067	Monastery of Saint Nicholas (Constantinople) (lost)	The Monastery of Saint Nicholas was located somewhere outside of the Golden Gate in Constantinople.
Eudokia Makrembolitissa	??		
Romanos IV Diogenes	~1072		
Michael VII Doukas	1090		
Nikephoros III Botaneiates	1081	Church of St. Mary Peribleptos (Constantinople) (unknown fate)	

=== Komnenos dynasty (1081–1185) ===
Person	Death	Tomb	Comments
Alexios I Komnenos	1118	Monastery of Christ Philanthropos (Constantinople) (lost)	The Monastery of Christ Philanthropos disappears from textual sources in 1453 and was likely destroyed at some point in the Ottoman period. The precise location of the monastery in modern-day Istanbul is unclear.
Isaac Komnenos	??	Theotokos Kosmosoteira (Feres) (unknown fate)	Where exactly Isaac's tomb would have been located in the Kosmosoteira is unclear.
John II Komnenos	1143	Monastery of the Pantokrator (Constantinople) (unknown fate; destroyed?) (Note: The Monastery of the Pantokrator was made a Venetian headquarter during the Latin occupation of Constantinople (1204–1261). The Komnenian tombs in the monastery were likely destroyed during this time.)	
Irene of Hungary (empress)	1134	Monastery of the Pantokrator (Constantinople) (unknown fate; destroyed?)	
Alexios Komnenos (co-emperor)	1142	Monastery of the Pantokrator (Constantinople) (unknown fate; destroyed?)	Buried in the same tomb as his father, John II.
Manuel I Komnenos	1180	Monastery of the Pantokrator (Constantinople) (unknown fate; destroyed?)	Buried in a black marble sarcophagus.
Bertha of Sulzbach (empress)	1159	Monastery of the Pantokrator (Constantinople) (unknown fate; destroyed?)	
Maria of Antioch (empress)	1182	Buried on a sea-shore near Constantinople (lost)	Maria of Antioch was killed on the orders of Andronikos I Komnenos. According to Niketas Choniates, she "was buried in obscurity in the sand of the nearby shore".
Alexios II Komnenos	1183	No burial	Alexios II Komnenos was strangled with a bowstring on the orders of Andronikos I Komnenos. According to Niketas Choniates, Andronikos had Alexios's body thrown in the sea, encased in lead. Choniates claims that Alexios's head was severed and kept by Andronikos, until it was "hidden in a hole in a corner of the district called Katabatê (Note: Katabatê means a steep or descending part of the city. It is not clear what part of Constantinople the term refers to.)".
Andronikos I Komnenos	1185	No burial	Andronikos I Komnenos was tortured to death in the Hippodrome by the people of Constantinople. His body was left unburied in the Hippodrome, where it remained visible for several years.

==== Komnenoi in Trebizond (1204–1461) ====
The Grand Komnenoi rulers of the Empire of Trebizond used the Panagia Chrysokephalos Church in Trebizond (the modern-day Fatih Mosque, Trabzon) as the main imperial burial place. There were some exceptions, such as Manuel I of Trebizond (d. 1263), who was buried in Trebizond's Hagia Sophia.

In 1917, the only surviving imperial tomb in the Chrysokephalos were discovered, containing the remains of Alexios IV of Trebizond (d. 1429). The structure was destroyed in 1919 but the remains of Alexios IV were handed over to the Pontic community in Greece. In 1980, Alexios IV's remains were reburied in the New Soumela monastery in the village of Kastania, near Veria in northern Greece.

=== Angelos dynasty (1185–1204) ===
Person	Death	Tomb	Comments
Isaac II Angelos	1204		
Alexios III Angelos	1211	Monastery of Hyakinthos (Nicaea) (unknown fate) (Note: The monastery was destroyed in 1922.)	Alexios III Angelos died in exile as a captive in the Empire of Nicaea. The Monastery of Hyakinthos functioned as the patriarchal cathedral of Nicaea's Ecumenical Patriarchate of Constantinople-in-exile. Alexios's daughter Anna and son-in-law Theodore I Laskaris were also buried there.
Alexios IV Angelos	1204		
Alexios V Doukas	1204		

=== Laskaris dynasty (1205–1261) ===
Person	Death	Tomb	Comments
Theodore I Laskaris	1221	Monastery of Hyakinthos (Nicaea) (unknown fate)	The Monastery of Hyakinthos functioned as the patriarchal cathedral of Nicaea's Ecumenical Patriarchate of Constantinople-in-exile.
Anna Komnene Angelina (empress)	1212	Monastery of Hyakinthos (Nicaea) (unknown fate)	The Monastery of Hyakinthos functioned as the patriarchal cathedral of Nicaea's Ecumenical Patriarchate of Constantinople-in-exile.
John III Doukas Vatatzes	1254	Sosandra monastery of the Virgin Gorgoepikoos (Mount Sipylus) (destroyed)	John III Doukas Vatatzes built the Sosandra monastery of the Virgin Gorgoepikoos on Mount Sipylus near the resting place of his wife, Irene Laskarina, and was buried there after his death. The Sosandra monastery was destroyed after Roman rule ended in Anatolia and nothing remains of the structure today. An Ottoman summer palace was built on the same site in the 15th century, but has also not survived.
Irene Laskarina (empress)	1240	Sosandra monastery of the Virgin Gorgoepikoos (?) (Mount Sipylus) (destroyed)	John III Doukas Vatatzes and Theodore II Laskaris was buried in "close vicinity" to Irene Laskarina's resting place.
Anna of Hohenstaufen (empress)	1307	Iglesia San Juan del Hospital (Valencia) (destroyed)	Anna left Byzantine territory some time after the recapture of Constantinople in 1261 (and the overthrow of the Laskaris dynasty by Michael VIII Palaiologos). She died in Valencia, in Spain, and was buried in Valencia's church of San Juan del Hospital. The church was heavily damaged in the Spanish Civil War (1936–1939). Anna's remains were reportedly destroyed or scattered around the site and her skull was for a time used as an ornament on the front of a car. The rebuilt church has a restored sepulchre for Anna, which refers to her as Constance Augusta, Empress of Greece (Constance having been her birth name). The restored sepulchre does not contain any remains.
Theodore II Laskaris	1258	Sosandra monastery of the Virgin Gorgoepikoos (Mount Sipylus) (destroyed)	Theodore II Laskaris was buried next to his father, John III Doukas Vatatzes.
John IV Laskaris	~1305	Monastery of Saint Demetrios (Constantinople) (unknown fate)	

=== Palaiologos dynasty (1259–1453) ===
Person	Death	Tomb	Comments
Michael VIII Palaiologos	1282	Nea Mone Monastery (Rhaidestos) (moved) Monastery of Christ (Selymbria) (lost)	Michael VIII Palaiologos probably intended to be buried in Constantinople, perhaps in the Church of the Holy Apostles or in the Monastery of Saint Demetrios (which was later used for the burial of John IV Laskaris). Michael was denied burial in the capital because of his unpopular religious policies. He was initially buried in the Nea Mone Monastery in Rhaidestos. In 1285, his body was moved to the Monastery of Christ in Selymbria, the same site as Basil II's reburial. The monastery is attested until 1481 but cannot be identified with any known Byzantine monuments in modern-day Silivri, meaning that no trace of the tomb survives.
A daughter (Anna Palaiologina?)	<1301	Lips Monastery (Constantinople) (unknown fate) (Note: Several tombs have been discovered in the Lips Monastery. The tombs and ossuaries that probably correspond to those used by the imperial family are either lost or empty.)	One of Michael VIII and Theodora's daughters (probably Anna) was the first Palaiologan family member to be buried in the Lips Monastery.
Eudokia Palaiologina	1302	Saint Gregory of Nyssa Church (possibly) (Trebizond) (destroyed)	Theodore Makridi suggested "without reason" that Eudokia (not Anna) was the daughter of Michael VIII and Theodora that was buried in the Lips Monastery. Eudokia died in Trebizond and was most likely buried there. Miller (1926) speculated that Eudokia was buried in the Saint Gregory of Nyssa Church in Trebizond; there is evidence that she was associated with this church. The Saint Gregory of Nyssa church was rebuilt in 1863 and demolished in 1930.
Theodora Palaiologina (empress)	1303	Lips Monastery (Constantinople) (unknown fate)	
Constantine Palaiologos	1306	Lips Monastery (Constantinople) (unknown fate)	Constantine died condemned and in prison, and "was buried like the common men in the outermost tombs" of the Lips Monastery.
Andronikos II Palaiologos	1328	Lips Monastery (Constantinople) (possibly discovered)	Andronikos II was buried in the Lips Monastery in Constantinople. Several coffins were discovered during an examination of the Lips Monastery in the early 20th century. Theodore Makridi identified an intact tomb discovered at this time as the tomb of Andronikos II. Marinis (2009) considers this identification to be without evidence but Melvani (2018) considers it reasonable.
Michael IX Palaiologos	1320	Unknown location	No source mentions the location of Michael IX's tomb. He may have been buried somewhere in Thessaloniki (where he died), perhaps in Hagios Demetrios.
Andronikos III Palaiologos	1341	Hodegon Monastery (Constantinople) (unknown fate) (Note: Nothing remains of the Hodegon Monastery today and no trace survives of the imperial tombs once found within it.)	
Irene of Brunswick (empress)	1324	Lips Monastery (Constantinople) (unknown fate)	
John V Palaiologos	1391	Hodegon Monastery (Constantinople) (unknown fate)	
John VI Kantakouzenos	1383	Unknown location	No source mentions the location of John VI's tomb. He died away from Constantinople and as a deposed usurper so was likely not buried in the capital. He may have been buried in a monastery in the Peloponnese, where his family had governed as despots.
Andronikos IV Palaiologos	1385	Monastery of the Pantokrator (?) (Constantinople) (unknown fate) (Note: After the fall of Constantinople, the Monastery of the Pantokrator was converted into a madrasa and eventually became the modern-day Zeyrek Mosque. The tombs have long been removed. No traces of the Palaiologan tombs that once were in the monastery have been found. The tombs were probably gone already in the 16th century, since Christian visitors to the site at that time do not record any tombs.)	Andronikos IV's burial in a monastery of the Pantokrator is mentioned in two short chronicles, one of which specify that the monastery was the Monastery of the Pantokrator in Constantinople. Melvani (2018) has questioned Andronikos's burial in the capital since he was a usurper-emperor who lost power in 1379 and then lived in Selymbria. Melvani suggests that Andronikos was actually buried in the Monastery of Christ in Selymbria (the same site as Michael VIII), which was sometimes also referred to as "the Pantokrator", and that the reference to Constantinople in one of the chronicles is an error.
John VII Palaiologos	1408	Unknown location	No source mentions the location of John VII's tomb. He may have been buried somewhere in Thessaloniki (where he died and was very popular), perhaps in Hagios Demetrios.
Irene Gattilusio (empress)	1440	Monastery of the Pantokrator (Constantinople) (unknown fate)	
Manuel II Palaiologos	1425	Monastery of the Pantokrator (Constantinople) (unknown fate)	
Andronikos Palaiologos	1429?	Monastery of the Pantokrator (?) (Constantinople) (unknown fate)	Different sources assign different fates to Andronikos. Laonikos Chalkokondyles records that he went to Mantineia in the Morea, where he died. Theodore Spandounes writes that he sailed for Venice but died during the journey. Sphrantzes claims that he became a monk in the Pantokrator Monastery in Constantinople, where he died in 1429 and was buried next to his father. A number of other sources, including Pseudo-Sphrantzes, claim that he became a monk in the Vatopedi Monastery, where he died. Burial in the Monastery of the Pantokrator is generally accepted.
Theodore II Palaiologos	1448	Monastery of the Pantokrator (Constantinople) (unknown fate)	
Helena Dragaš (empress)	1450	Monastery of the Pantokrator (Constantinople) (unknown fate) Relics moved to the Saint Patapios Monastery (?) (Loutraki)	Helena Dragaš was buried in the Monastery of the Pantokrator in Constantinople. The Saint Patapios Monastery in Loutraki, Greece claims that Helena's remains were moved there after the fall of Constantinople, and keeps her purported skull as a holy relic.
John VIII Palaiologos	1448	Monastery of the Pantokrator (Constantinople) (unknown fate)	
Anna of Moscow (empress)	1417	Lips Monastery (Constantinople) (unknown fate)	
Maria of Trebizond (empress)	1439	Monastery of the Pantokrator (Constantinople) (unknown fate)	
Constantine XI Palaiologos	1453	No burial (?)	Constantine XI died in battle during the fall of Constantinople and it is unclear if his body was found. In either case it is unlikely that a burial was arranged, either by the Ottoman authorities who took control of the city or by the Greek Orthodox religious authorities who had staunchly opposed Constantine's unionist religious policies. Ottoman sources imply that Sultan Mehmed II, the conqueror of Constantinople, wished to arrange a burial, but it is impossible to identify any location if a burial took place.

==== Post-imperial Palaiologoi (after 1453) ====
Person	Death	Tomb	Comments
Thomas Palaiologos	1465	Saint Peter's Basilica (Rome) (unknown fate) (Note: Modern efforts to locate the tombs of Thomas and Andreas Palaiologos in Saint Peter's Basilica (demolished and rebuilt in the 16th century) have been unsuccessful.)	
Andreas Palaiologos	1502	Saint Peter's Basilica (Rome) (unknown fate)	Andreas's tomb was next to that of his father, Thomas.
Sophia Palaiologina	1503	Cathedral of the Archangel (Moscow)	

== See also ==
- List of Roman emperors
- List of Roman and Byzantine empresses
- Roman funerary practices
