= 3rd-century Roman domes =

In the 3rd century, imperial mausolea began to be built as domed rotundas rather than tumulus structures or other types, following similar monuments by private citizens. Pagan and Christian domed mausolea from this time can be differentiated in that the structures of the buildings also reflect their religious functions. The pagan buildings are typically two story, dimly lit, free-standing structures with a lower crypt area for the remains and an upper area for devotional sacrifice. Christian domed mausolea contain a single well-lit space and are usually attached to a church. The first St. Peter's Basilica would later be built near a preexisting early 3rd century domed rotunda that may have been a mausoleum. In the 5th century the rotunda would be dedicated to St. Andrew and joined to the Mausoleum of Honorius.

== Severan dynasty ==
The large rotunda of the Baths of Agrippa, the oldest public baths in Rome, has been dated to the Severan period at the beginning of the 3rd century, but it is not known whether this is an addition or simply a reconstruction of an earlier domed rotunda.

The Aqua Flavianae in Algeria was rebuilt by Septimius Severus in 208. It included a 12 meter diameter dome built with vaulting tubes. Use of such vaulting tubes proliferated in the Tunisia area in the 3rd century and spread outside of North Africa in the 4th century.

Masonry domes were less common in the Roman provinces, although the 3rd century "Temple of Venus" at Baalbek was built with a stone dome 10 meters (33 ft) in diameter.

The Round Temple in Ostia has been dated to the 3rd century under Elagabalus. It was 60 feet (18 meters) in diameter with square niches on the major axes and semicircular niches on the diagonal axes. Eight bases for column shafts that could have supported the dome remain between the niches. The building resembles the mausoleum at Diocletian's Palace in Split, although there is no basement room other than a small well under the rear niche.

== Gordian dynasty ==
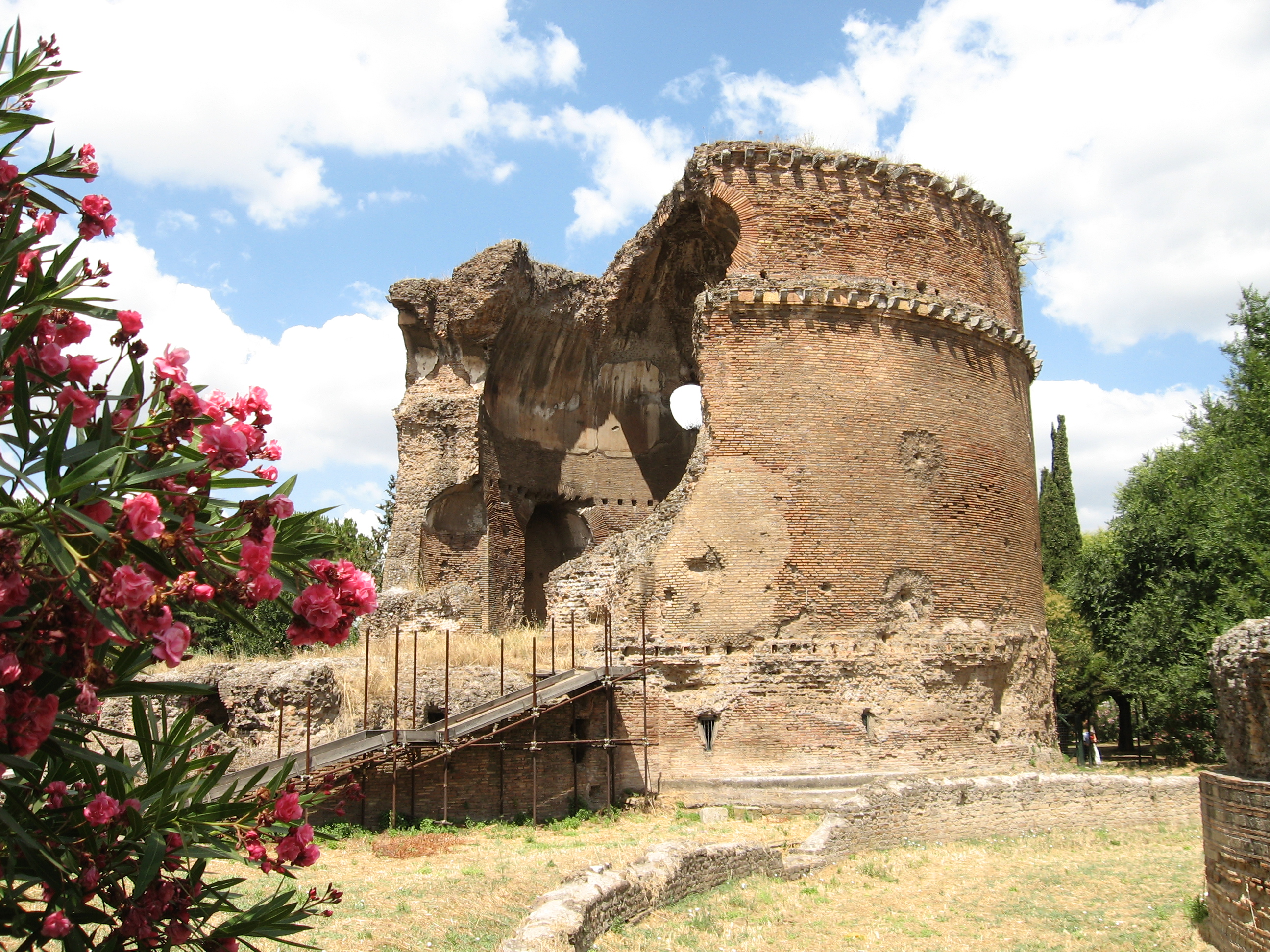
Ruins at Villa Gordiani

An example from the 3rd century is the mausoleum at Villa Gordiani. The Villa Gordiani also contains remains of an oval gored dome.

== Gallienus ==
The use of the circular or octagonal domed rotunda for imperial mausolea began with Emperor Gallienus in the 260s and the type would be used throughout the late-antique period.

== Diocletian ==
A stone corbelled dome 5.806 meters (19.05 ft) wide, later known as "Arthur's O'on", was located in Scotland three kilometers north of the Falkirk fort on the Antonine Wall and may have been a Roman victory monument from the reign of Carausius. It was destroyed in 1743.

The technique of building lightweight domes with interlocking hollow ceramic tubes further developed in North Africa and Italy in the late 3rd and early 4th centuries. Remains at the Baths of the Cyclops in Dougga include corner vaulting that forms a section of a sphere and is made of terracotta vaulting tubes. By the 4th century, the thin and lightweight tubed vaulting had become a vaulting technique in its own right, rather than simply serving as a permanent centering for concrete. It was used in early Christian buildings in Italy. Arranging these terracotta tubes in a continuous spiral created a dome that was not strong enough for very large spans, but required only minimal centering and formwork. The later dome of the Baptistry of Neon in Ravenna is an example.

The Tempio della Tosse in Tivoli is a Pantheon-like domed rotunda from the 3rd or 4th centuries.

== See also ==
- List of Roman domes
- History of architecture
