= Šarkamen =

- Settlement
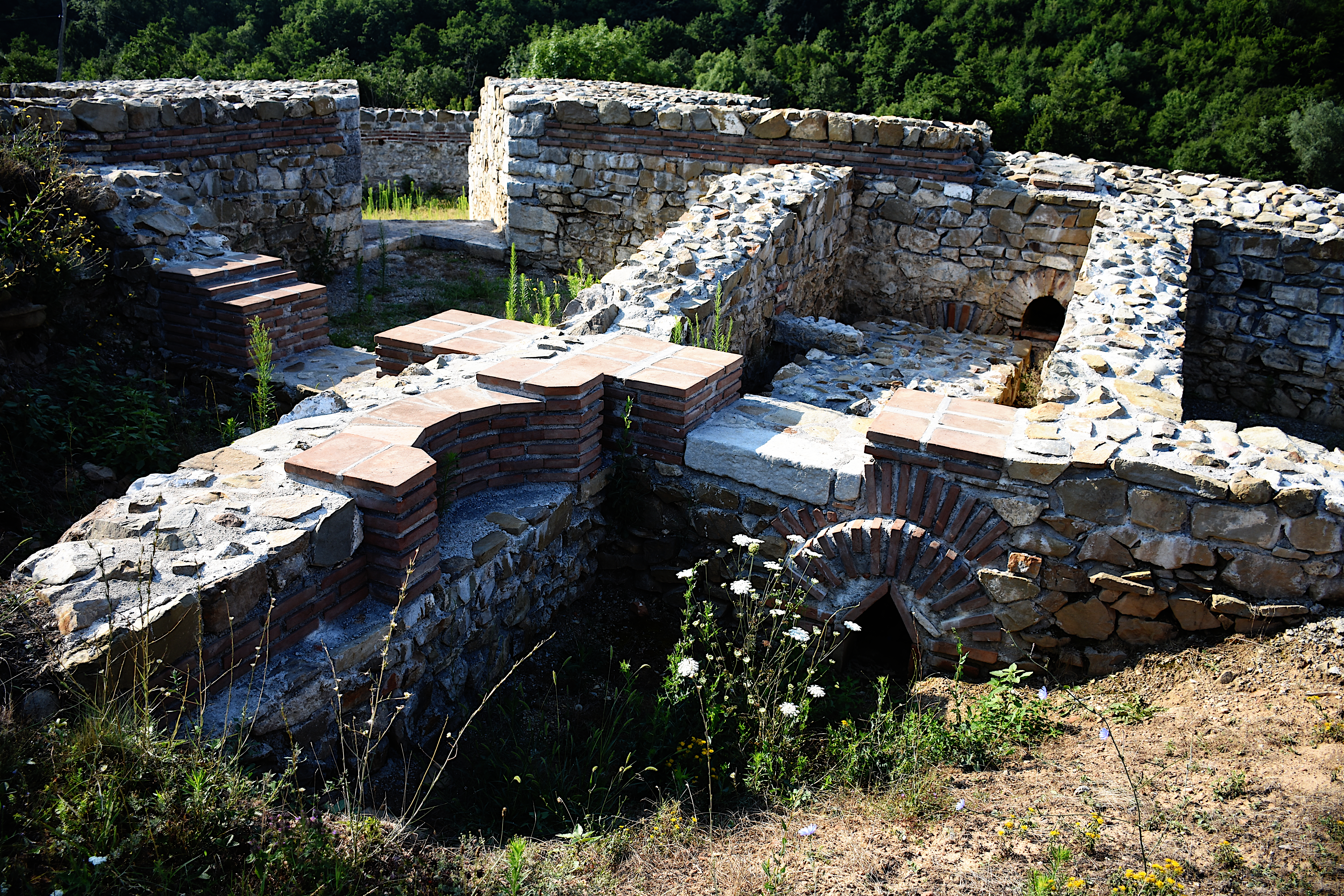
- Roman ruins at Vrelo Šarkamen

- Location within Serbia
- Coordinates: 44°15′N 22°21′E
- Country: Serbia
- District: Bor District
- Municipality: Negotin
- Elevation: 673 ft (205 m)

Population (2002)
  - Total: 369
- Time zone: UTC+1 (CET)
  - Summer (DST): UTC+2 (CEST)
- Area code: 019

Šarkamen (Serbian Cyrillic: Шаркамен) is a settlement situated in eastern Serbia, in the Negotin municipality of the Bor District. It is inhabited by 369 people, with a Serb majority (98,66%)

== History ==
=== Archaeology ===
==== Roman ====
The town houses an archaeological site known as Vrelo Šarkamen, spanning an area of 25 hectares. A Roman resident/memorial complex with a mausoleum on the slopes of Deli Jovan was built during the tetrarchy (early 4th century in Dacia Ripensis), of which today only ruins exist. The complex was discovered by Dragoslav Srejović. The mausoleum is dated to 293–311, and is dedicated to the mother of Emperor Maximinus Daia, who was born nearby. Notable imperial gold jewelry has been found, including a golden ring of the Emperor's mother.

In 2026, archaeologists excavating the imperial complex uncovered a private Roman bath (balneum) constructed within the lowest level of the palace’s massive south-western corner tower. The bath dates to the early 4th century CE and includes three bathing pools or tubs, a sudatorium (steam room), a praefurnium (furnace), and a well-preserved hypocaust system with circular pilae used to heat the floors. Archaeologists also identified the installation for a copper water-heating boiler, although the boiler itself is no longer present. The discovery provides evidence for the architectural design and heating technology of the imperial residential complex associated with Maximinus Daia.
