= Mausoleum of Galla Placidia =

Roman mausoleum

Coordinates: 44°25′16″N 12°11′49″E

UNESCO World Heritage Site
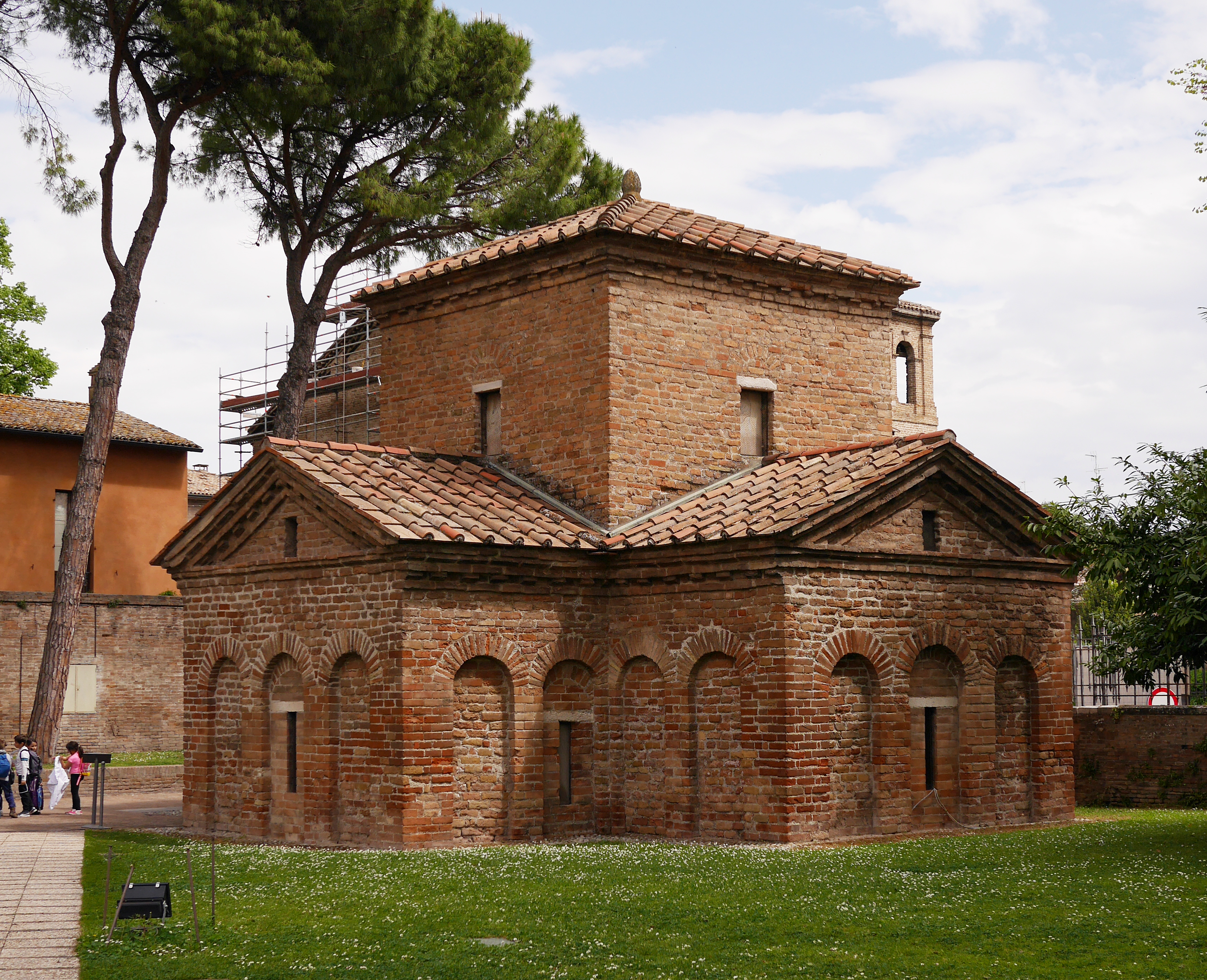
- Mausoleum of Galla Placidia, Early Christian Monuments of Ravenna

- Location within Emilia-Romagna Location within Italy
- Location: Ravenna, Emilia-Romagna, Italy
- Part of: Early Christian Monuments of Ravenna
- Criteria: Cultural: (i), (ii), (iii), (iv)
- Reference: 788-001
- Inscription: 1996 (20th Session)
- Area: 0.01 ha (0.025 acres)
- Buffer zone: 4.5 ha (11 acres)
- Website: https://www.ravennamosaici.it/en/mausoleum-of-galla-placidia/

The Mausoleum of Galla Placidia is a Late Antique Roman building in Ravenna, Italy, built between 425 and 450. It was added to the World Heritage List together with seven other structures in Ravenna in 1996. Despite its common name, the empress Galla Placidia (d. 450) was not buried in the building, a misconception dating from the thirteenth century; she died in Rome and was buried there, probably alongside Honorius in the Mausoleum of Honorius at Old Saint Peter's Basilica.

== History ==
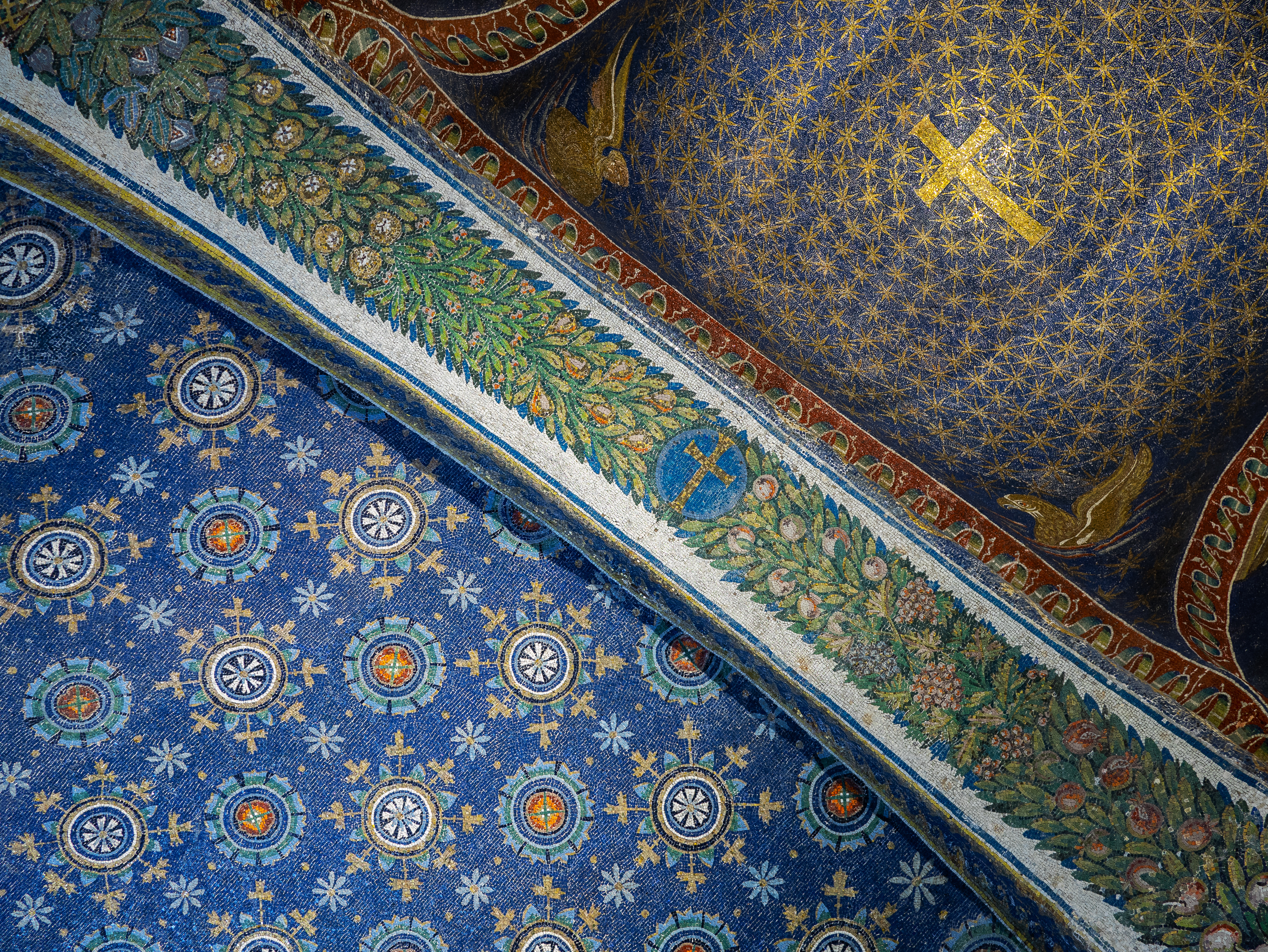
Ceiling

The "mausoleum" of Galla Placidia, built 425–450, is a cruciform chapel or oratory that originally adjoined the narthex of the Church of the Holy Cross (Santa Croce) in Ravenna, which was built in 417 as the church for the imperial palace. It was probably dedicated to Saint Lawrence.

Aelia Galla Placidia, the likely patron of the building's construction, was the daughter of Theodosius I and Galla, the daughter of Valentinian I. Raised by Serena, wife of Stilicho, she was made nobilissima in her youth and granted a palace by her father in Constantinople. She received an advanced education both secular and religious, as is evident from her letters. She married Athaulf, King of the Visigoths in 414 in Spain after moving to the West, though he soon died and she married the patricius Constantius (later Constantius III) in 417. Their children were Justa Grata Honoria and Valentinian III. Constantius III was elevated as co-emperor of the West in 421 by Honorius, who lacked an heir, and Galla Placidia was made augusta; Constantius died the same year and Galla Placidia fled to Constantinople. When Honorius died in 423, the primicerius notariorum Joannes succeeded as augustus in the West; thereafter Theodosius II, augustus in the East, moved to install Galla Placidia's son Valentinian as emperor in the West instead, appointing him caesar.

The building dates from after 425; in that year the six-year old Valentinian III took office as augustus in 425 and Galla Placidia's title as augusta was again secured – she ruled as regent for her son for twelve years. Her political influence waned with the growing maturity of her son and the rise to prominence of the patricius Flavius Aëtius in the 430s, but she remained powerful until she died in 450. She was an active patron of religious institutions, building churches at Ravenna, Rome, and Jerusalem. She contributed to the refurbishment of Saint Paul's outside-the-walls (San Paolo fuori le Mura), as recorded in an inscription there.

A basilica in Ravenna dedicated to Saint John the Evangelist (San Giovanni Evangelista) was also built by Galla Placidia after 425; it commemorated the augusta's and her children's deliverance from a threatening storm during a sea-voyage and was adorned with portraits of her and other members of the Theodosian dynasty. The basilica did not survive the Second World War. According to the mediaeval Liber Pontificalis Ecclesiae Ravennatis, an inscription on the apse of that basilica recorded the buildings status as an ex-voto in gratitude for Galla Placidia's survival at sea. The Liber Pontificalis also claims her burial was at the monasterium of Saint Nazarius at Ravenna. This claim, originally probably made in Rome, is the probable origin of the misconception that Galla Placidia was buried in Ravenna, rather than in Rome, which culminated in the Ravennates' claim that she was buried in the chapel now known as her "mausoleum".

The building was formerly the oratory of the Church of the Holy Cross and now contains three sarcophagi. The sarcophagus to the right is attributed to Galla's brother, Emperor Honorius. The one on the left is attributed to her husband, Emperor Constantius III, and her son, Valentinian III. The largest sarcophagus was thought to contain the remains of Galla Placidia herself. Her embalmed body was reportedly deposited there in a sitting position, clothed with the imperial mantle, and visible through a peep-hole. In 1577, however, the contents of the sarcophagus were accidentally burned when children inserted a lighted taper.

The floor has been raised by five feet since the fifth century in order to remain above the rising water along the upper Adriatic coast.

== Architecture and decoration ==
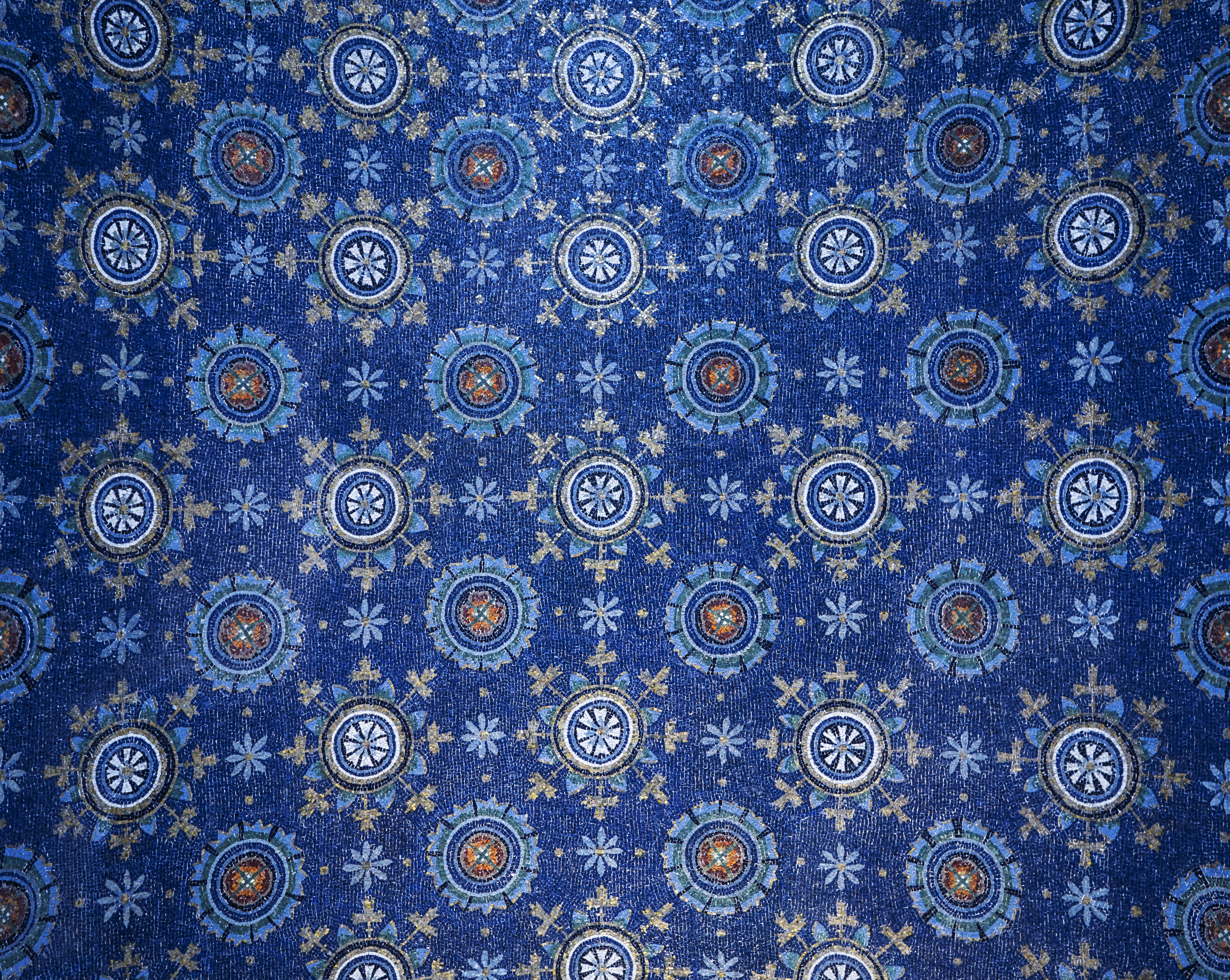
Ceiling mosaic Garden of Eden.

External videos
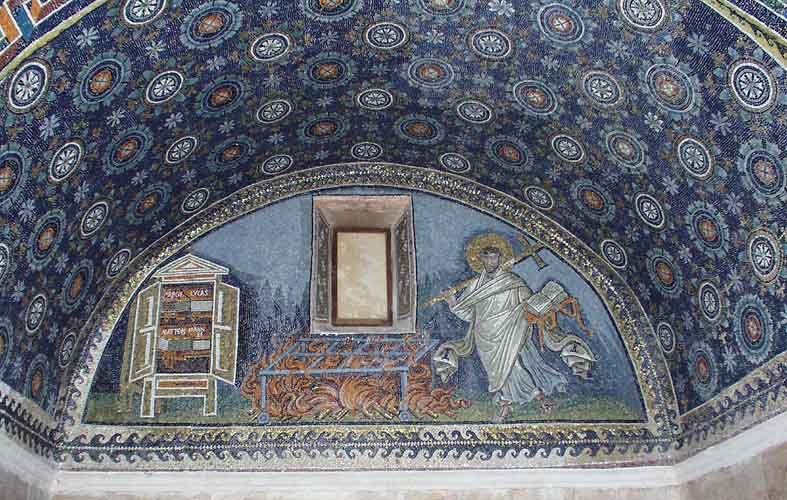
- The Mausoleum of Galla Placidia, Smarthistory

The mausoleum is laid out in a cruciform floor plan, with a central dome on pendentives and barrel vaults over the four transepts. The exterior of the dome is enclosed in a square tower that rises above the gabled lateral wings. The brick surface is set with narrow mortar joints and decorated with blind arcades. Light enters through modern alabaster window panels.

The iconographic themes developed in the decorations represent the victory of eternal life over death.

The interior of the mausoleum is covered with rich mosaics. The inside contains two famous mosaic lunettes, and the rest of the interior is filled with mosaics of Christian and Apocalyptic symbols.

Mosaics composed of glass tesserae cover the interior walls of the vault, the lunettes and the cupola; the adornments are of high quality. Above the entrance portal is a mosaic depicting Christ as the Good Shepherd among his flock. The barrel-vaults of the four arms of the cruciform chapel bear vegetal mosaics consisting of acanthus and vine scrolls. In the western arm's lunette a mosaic represents deer approaching a spring, perhaps a reference to Psalm 42, whose incipit is "As the hart panteth after the water brooks, so panteth my soul after thee, O God." In the southern transept's lunette is a mosaic depicting a male saint carrying a cross accompanied by a burning gridiron and an opened cabinet containing the four canonical Gospels, identified by the names of the Four Evangelists in Latin. Unidentified figures of white-robed martyrs decorate the lunettes of the east and west transepts. The interior of the dome at the centre is decorated as a starry sky, with a regular mosaic of golden stars on a dark blue background, with a gold cross represented at the apex of the dome and the four symbols of the Evangelists (or the "living creatures" of Revelation 4:7) at the corner pendentives. The four lunettes below the dome, between the arches springing from the four central piers and the arches of the pendentives above them, have mosaics each depicting two Apostles with their right arms raised in acclamation likely directed at the male saint in the southern transept's mosaic.

The sky with stars or clouds was often depicted as decoration of domes, apses, and ceilings of churches. The basilica in Rome of Saint Pudentiana (Santa Pudenziana), built in the late 4th century, is an example predating Galla Placidia's building, while later buildings at Ravenna repeated the motif, including the Chapel of Saint Andrew (capella Sant'Andrea) in the Archiepiscopal Palace and the 6th century basilica of Saint Apollinaris in Classe (Sant'Apollinare in Classe).

=== North entrance mosaic - the Good Shepherd ===
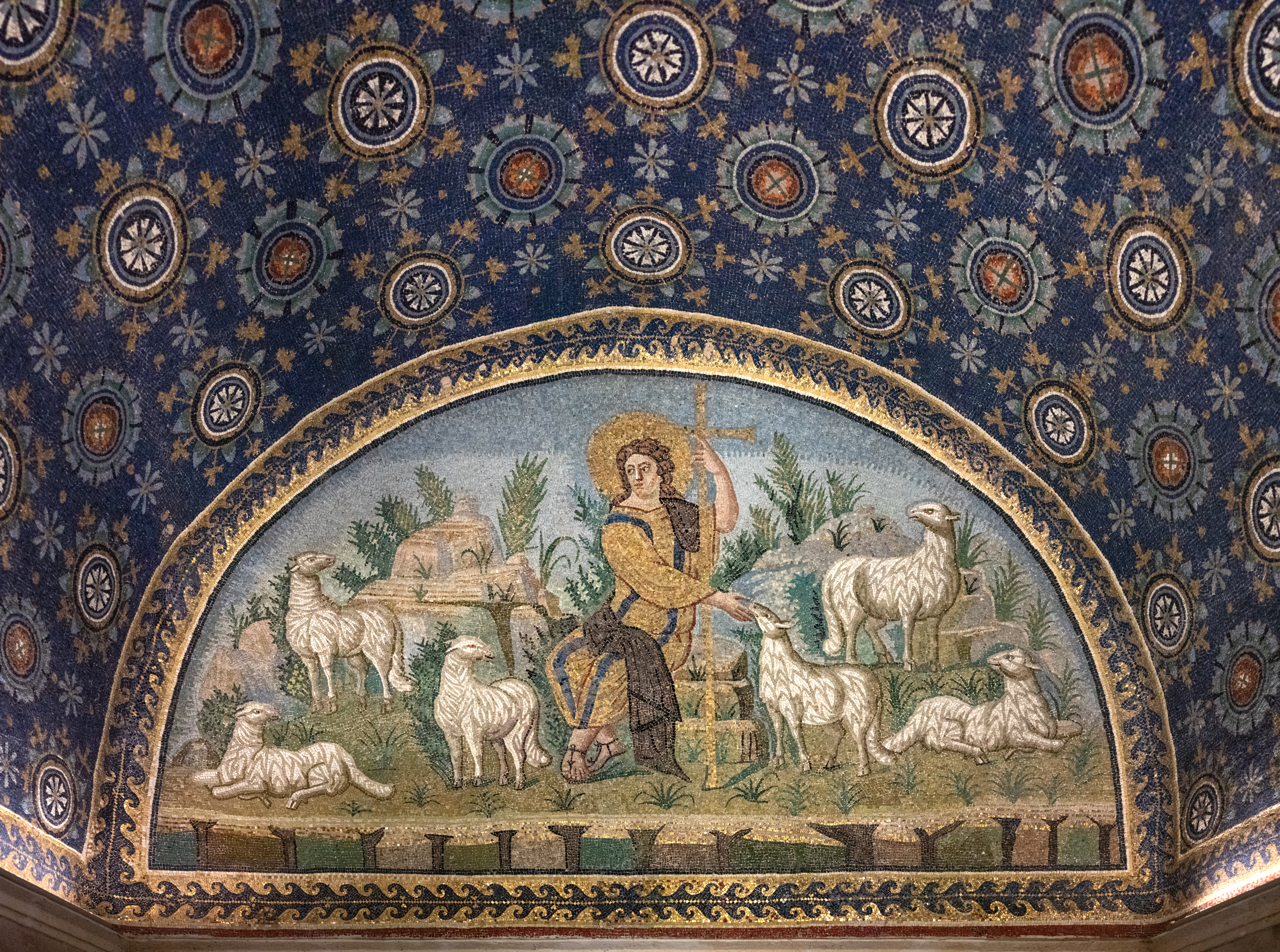
The Good Shepherd

The figure of the Good Shepherd and pastoral scenes were familiar to Christian thought; depictions of a young man, the criophorus, bearing on his shoulders a sheep were known in the ancient world from the 6th century BC and was adopted from the late 3rd century AD into Christian art, especially in funerary contexts. The shepherd was understood to represent Christ, as in John 10:11-17 and Luke 15:4-7. Here the beardless figure of the shepherd is in imperial garb, wearing purple and gold and bearing a cruciform staff in place of the usual shepherd's crook.

The Lunette of Christ as Good Shepherd over the north entrance is representative of Christian art at this time period in late antiquity. The mosaic represents a transition period between the naturalistic depictions of the classical period in art history and the stylized representations of the medieval period. The forms still have three-dimensional bulk, but the shading such as in the folds of the robes is less refined than in the past, and figures are not very grounded. Elements of realism have been sacrificed for a focus on the spiritual elements. He holds an imperial staff joined to the Christian cross, symbolizing the combined earthly and heavenly domains.

=== South transept lunette - male saint ===
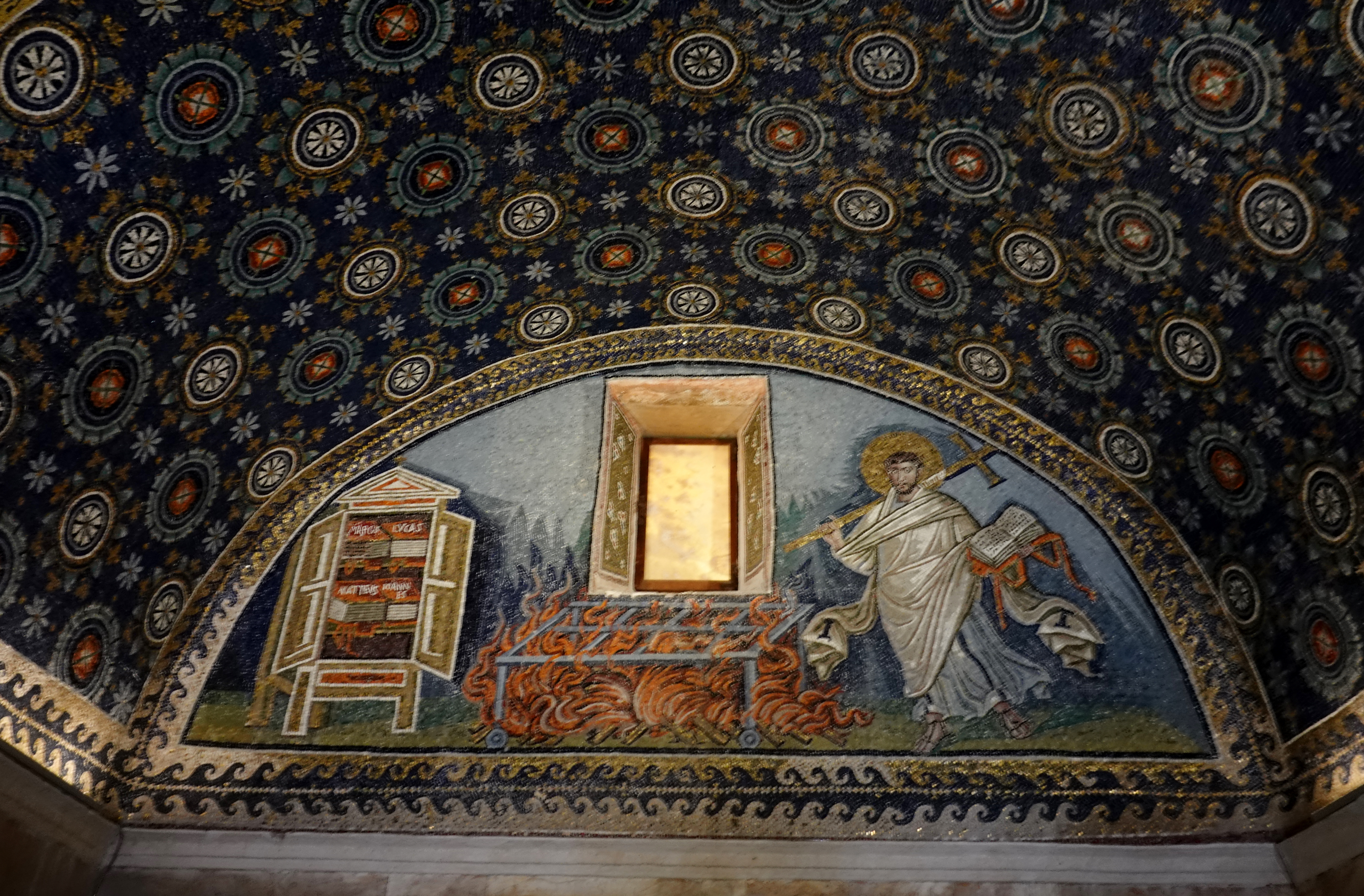
Southern lunette.

The art historian Gillian Mackie argues that this panel represents the Spanish Saint Vincent of Saragossa rather than the Italian Saint Lawrence. Mackie cites Galla's connection to Spain; in addition, St. Vincent was martyred by drowning at sea, and Galla and her children had been delivered from shipwreck. The panel seems to be an illustration of the poem about St. Vincent in Prudentius's fifth century Passio Sancti Vincentii Martyris. In the poem St. Vincent is ordered to disclose his sacred books to be burned. This explains the cupboard containing the Gospels, which has no satisfactory explanation in the story of St. Lawrence. Osbert Lancaster, who identified the figure as Saint Lawrence, shown here with the flaming gridiron of his martyrdom, observes that this is the earliest representation of any figure, other than Christ, to be shown with a halo.

== Musical association ==
The mausoleum is reputed to have inspired American songwriter Cole Porter to compose "Night and Day" while on a 1920s visit.

== See also ==
- List of Roman domes
- Ancient Roman architecture
- Ancient Roman and Byzantine domes
- Church architecture
