= Kastania, Kozani =

Kastania Καστανιά
- Community
- Location within Greece
- Coordinates: 40°10′29″N 22°01′28″E
- Country: Greece
- Administrative region: Western Macedonia
- Regional unit: Kozani
- Municipality: Servia
- Municipal unit: Servia

Population (2021)
  - Community: 514
- Time zone: UTC+2 (EET)
  - Summer (DST): UTC+3 (EEST)
- Postal code: 50500
- Area code: +30 2464

Kastania is a village in Servia municipality, Kozani regional unit, in the Greek region of Macedonia. It is situated at an altitude of 1,050 metres (3,445 ft) above sea level. At the 2021 census the population was 514.

The Monastery of Agioi Theodoroi at Kastania and the Byzantium Monastery of St. Antonios Siapkas are both located in Kastania.

== Notable people ==
- Odysseas Vlachodimos
- Panagiotis Vlachodimos
