= Temple of the gens Flavia =

Temple in ancient Rome

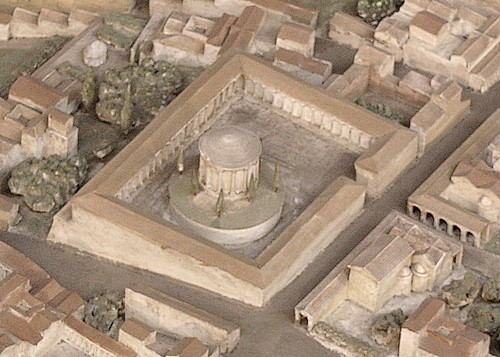
The temple on the Gismondi model at the EUR, Rome.

The Temple of the Flavian clan (Latin: templum gentis Flaviae) was a Roman temple on the Quirinal Hill, dedicated by Domitian at the end of the 1st century to other members of the Flavian dynasty. It was sited at the ad Malum Punicum, on a site near the present-day junction of Via XX Settembre and Via delle Quattro Fontane. This site was near the residences of Vespasian (Domitian's birthplace) and Vespasian's brother Titus Flavius Sabinus.

The temple is first mentioned in Book IX of Martial's Epigrams, a poetic work published ca. 94. This would make it seem that the temple was built and dedicated towards the end of Domitian's reign, as the culmination of his campaign to deify his elder brother Titus, Titus' daughter Julia Flavia and Domitian's own son who had died in infancy.

In A.D. 96 the temple was struck by lightning. It was likely expanded under Claudius Gothicus ca. A.D. 268-270.

A series of fragmentary sculptures executed in Pentelic marble have been associated with the now lost temple. These fragments were dispersed through the art market, with some fragments remaining in Italy while others ended up in the United States.

== See also ==
- List of Ancient Roman temples

== Bibliography ==
- John Ferguson, The Religions of the Roman Empire, Cornell University Press, 1985
- Samuel Ball Platner and Thomas Ashby, A topographical dictionary of Ancient Rome, Oxford University Press, 1929
- Filippo Coarelli, Rome and environs, an archaeological guide, University of California Press, 2007
