= Pilae =

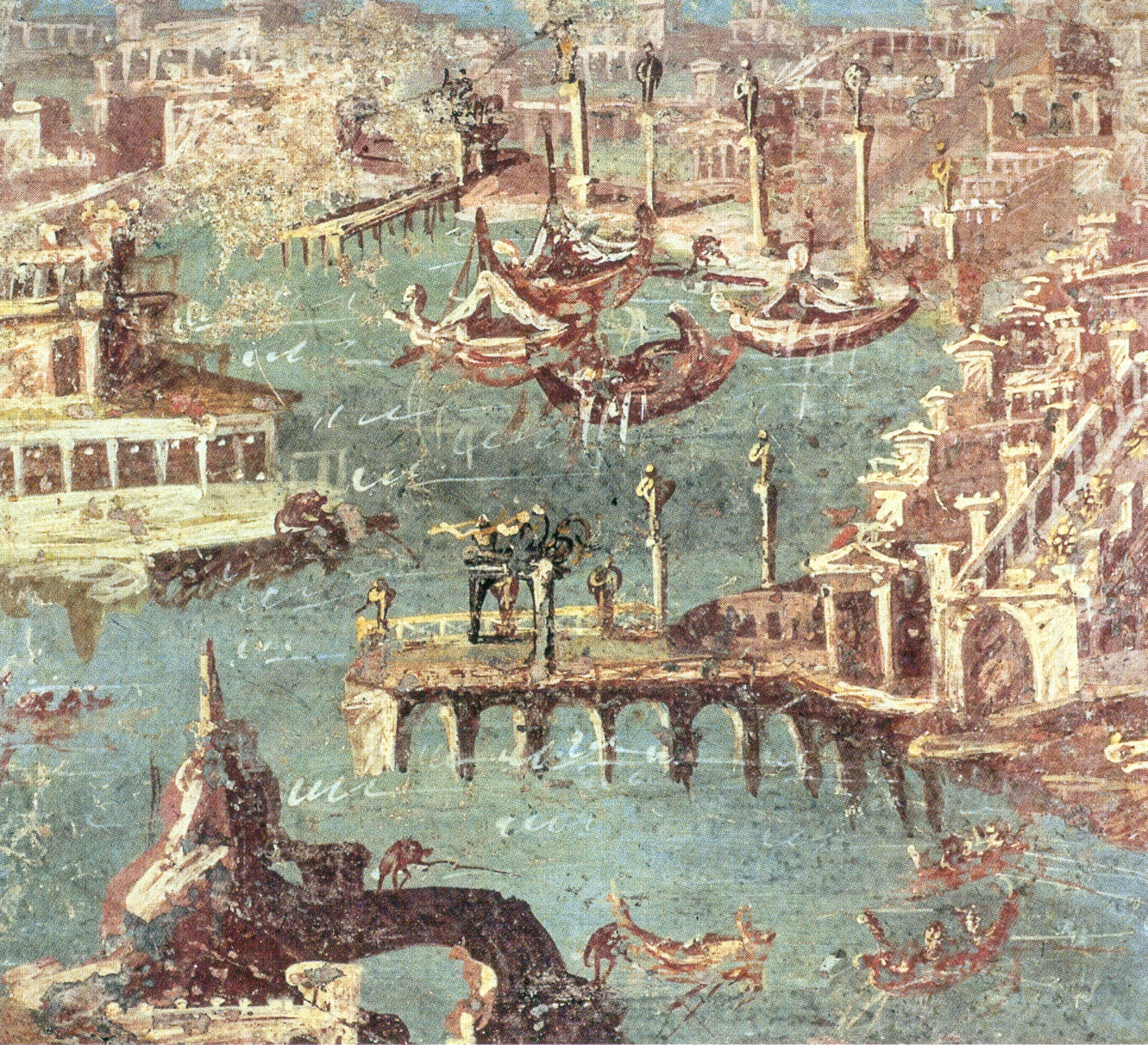
Wall painting from Stabiae showing harbour with pilae, 1st century

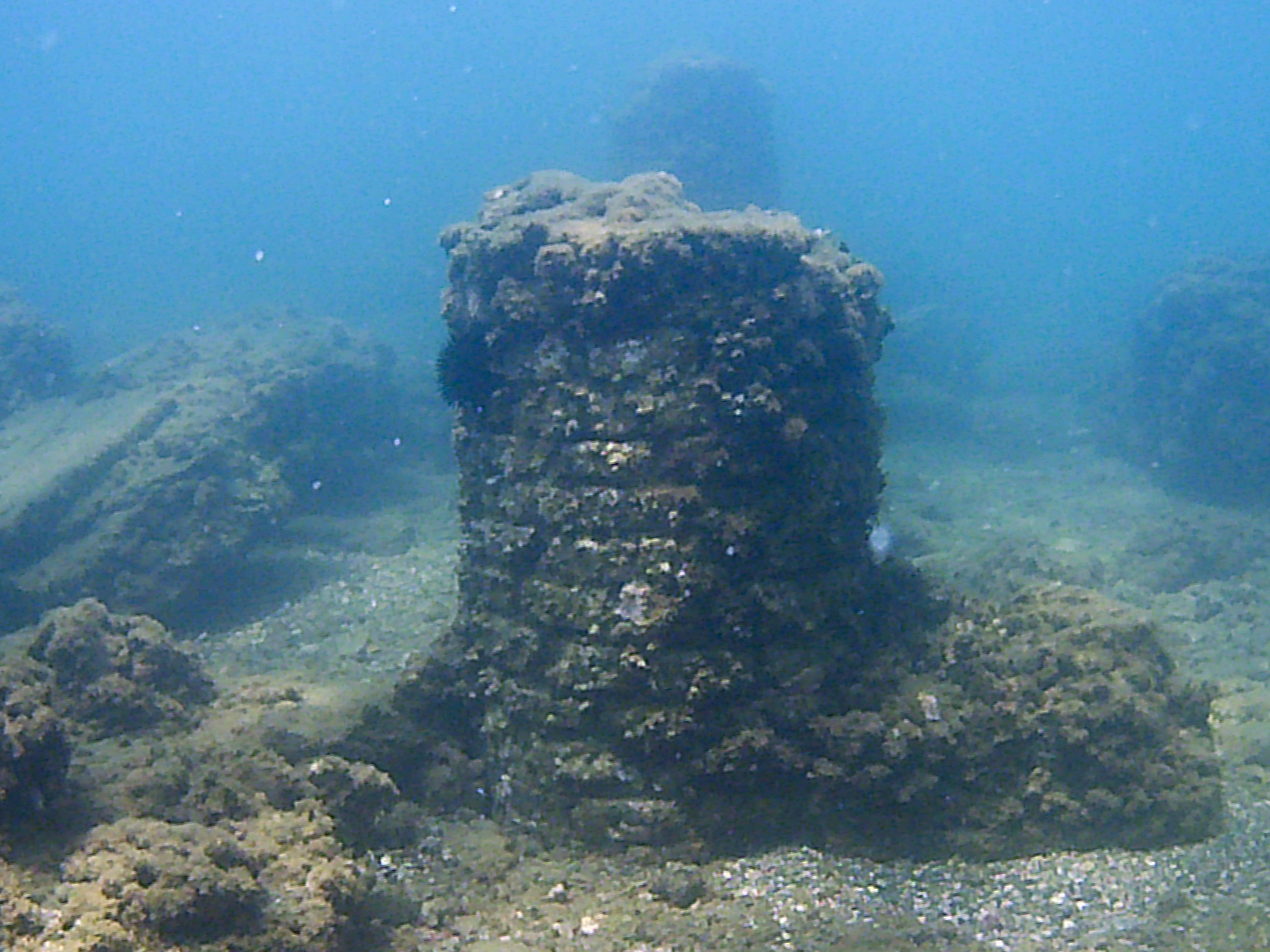
Pilae from Portus Julius, Baiae

Pilae (singular pila) is the Latin word the ancient Romans used for "piers", "piles" or "pylons", vertical pillars often used to support structures such as hypocausts.

Pilae were also used in concrete piers in the Gulf of Pozzuoli at Baiae, Misenum, and Nisida. These are illustrated in a 1st-century fresco from Stabiae.

Ancient glass flasks have been found that illustrate the Puteoli breakwaters with the inscription "pilae".
