= Mausoleum of Honorius =

Former tomb in Rome

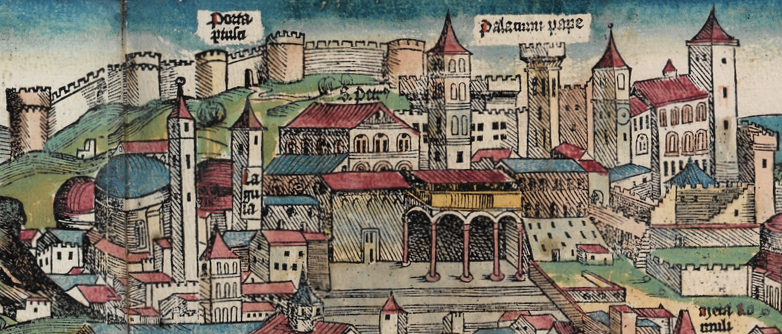
Vatican Hill and Old St Peter's Basilica, Rome. Illustration from the Nuremberg Chronicle (1490). The large domed structure with windows at the left represents the Mausoleum of Honorius.

The Mausoleum of Honorius was a late antique circular mausoleum and the burial place of the Roman emperor Honorius and other 5th-century imperial family members. Constructed for the Augustus of the western Roman Empire beside Old St Peter's Basilica in Rome, the Mausoleum of Honorius was the last Roman imperial mausoleum built.

It became the Chapel of St Petronilla, dedicated to Saint Petronilla, the purported daughter of Saint Peter. Her relics were translated to the mausoleum in 757 at the behest of Pepin the Short, king of Francia. Its association with the medieval Kingdom of France continued until the Renaissance, and it was known by the Italian: Capella dei Re Franchi, lit. 'Chapel of the French Kings' or Capella de' Franchi, 'Chapel of the French'. The mausoleum was demolished in late November 1519, during the construction of St Peter's Basilica.

== History ==
=== Construction ===
The empress Maria died before 408, but the building may not have been complete at that time; it may have been begun any time between around 400 and 415. Maria's early death itself may have prompted the mausoleum's construction. The mausoleum was built next to the Vatican Rotunda, another round structure on the Vatican Hill to which the Mausoleum of Honorius was very similar in size and plan. The Vatican Rotunda appears to have been constructed on the spina (central barrier) of the Circus of Nero, a 1st-century AD Roman circus whose spina was also the site of the Vatican obelisk. Aligned with the obelisk and the Vatican Rotunda, it has been suggested that the Mausoleum in fact pre-dated Honorius's Theodosian dynasty and was contemporary with the Rotunda, constructed under the Severan dynasty in the 3rd century. However, the connection between the Mausoleum of Honorius and the Basilica Constantiniana (Old St Peter's) at the latter's south transept indicates the former was built subsequent to the basilica.

The Mausoleum of Honorius and Constantine the Great's St Peter's Basilica had the same floor level, while the Vatican Rotunda's floor level was much lower, though the foundations of each are assumed to be at a similar level. As a result, the mausoleum probably included a significant space between the foundations and the interior floor. Under the arch of each of the mausoleum's seven niches, a vaulted brick chamber (sacellum) existed some 2 metres (6.6 ft) beneath the floor, within which the sarcophagi would have been laid. This arrangement has parallels with the podia of the tombs of the emperor Galerius and his mother Romula at Romuliana. However, it is possible that the brick chambers were not part of the original plan, and that the imperial sarcophagi were vaulted over with a higher floor at a later period. Perhaps this was to protect them from damage or was part of the mausoleum's 8th-century conversion into the Chapel of St Petronilla.

=== Burials ===
The first burial inside the mausoleum was that of the augusta Maria, daughter of Stilicho and first wife of Honorius. The first emperor of the Theodosian dynasty to be entombed there was Honorius himself, buried in 424. Honorius's second wife Thermantia was very likely also buried there; even though she was repudiated by Honorius not long after they wed, Thermantia remained an imperial family member by marriage and by birth, and according to Zosimus she lived in Rome after her divorce from the emperor. (Note: Zosimus, Historia Nova, 5.35.3; 5.37.5.) Theodosius, the first son of the augusta Galla Placidia by her first husband Athaulf, king of the Visigoths, was recorded by Prosper of Aquitaine as buried there in 450. (Note: Prosper Tironis, Epitome chronicon, anno 451 (sic)) Her son Valentinian III, from her second marriage to Constantius III, was probably buried in the same mausoleum, but this information is not recorded explicitly.

Honorius's sister, Galla Placidia, her husband the augustus Constantius III, and her sons Theodosius and Valentinian III were probably buried there.

It was later the probable tomb of the western augusti Libius Severus and Olybrius.

The sarcophagi were buried beneath the floor of the mausoleum, beneath the niches in the walls.

Like the Mausoleum of Constantine connected with the Church of the Holy Apostles in Constantinople, the Mausoleum of Honorius was a "symbol of the elevated status of the emperors", since the imperial mausolea of the emperors were symbolic of the deification of Roman emperors, the Latin: divi, lit. 'gods'. Imperial mausolea during late antiquity were probably used in the manner of a heroön, for commemorative meals in honour of the deceased, as the centre of a family cult including sacrifices to the dead, and during Parentalia, the Roman festival of the dead in February. This was generally separate from the public commemoration of divinized imperial figures; these were usually associated with the honorand's official birthday (Latin: dies natalis) and their public temples.

Honorius's brother Arcadius, augustus in the east, was buried in the "South Stoa" of the Church of the Holy Apostles. In the 4th century another pair of sibling-augusti, the emperors Valens and Valentinian I had governed the eastern and western provinces of the empire respectively; when Valentinian died Valens arranged for his brother to be buried in the Mausoleum of Constantine. It appears no such plan was ever contemplated for the remains of Honorius.

=== Chapel ===
The building was remembered as a mausoleum in the 8th century. The structure is twice referred to as such in the Liber Pontificalis, in the biographies first of Pope Stephen II (r. 752–757) and then his successor Pope Paul I (r. 757–767). Knowledge of its identity as a site of imperial burials is not definitively attested and it appears the identity of its occupants had been forgotten and the burials concealed. In 757, Paul I ordered the translation of the relics of St Petronilla to the mausoleum of Honorius. His predecessor Stephen II had already, according to the Liber, converted the structure adjacent to the chapel of St Andrew into a chapel dedicated to St Petronilla and had made an undertaking to the king of Francia, Pepin the Short, that he would translate her relics to the building.

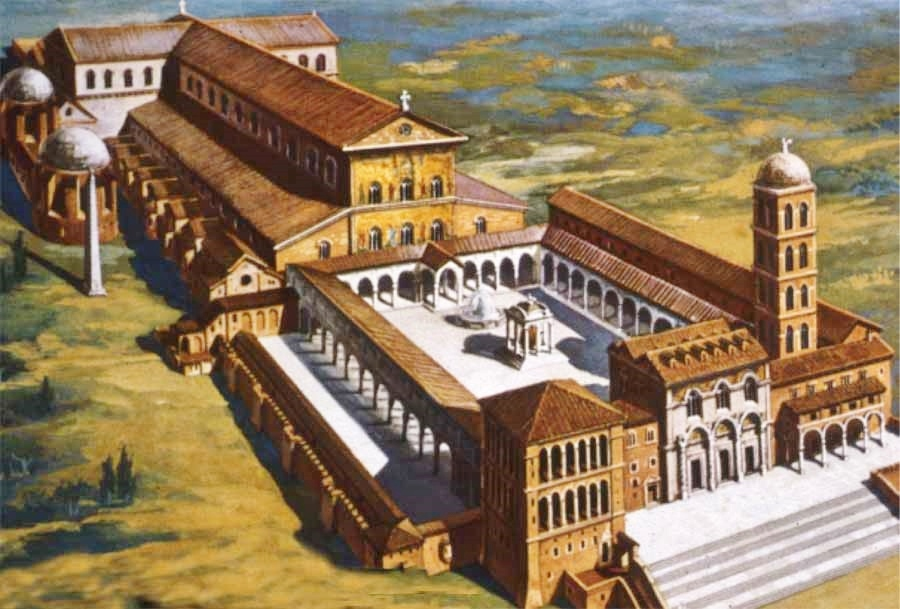
Reconstruction of Old St Peter's Basilica. The Mausoleum of Honorius is the domed structure at the extreme top left, behind the rotunda Sant'Andrea and the Vatican obelisk.

=== Demolition ===
For the construction of the 16th-century St Peter's Basilica, the 4th-century Constantinian building was gradually demolished, together with all its chapels, by order of Pope Julius II. The Mausoleum of Honorius (S. Petronilla) and the Vatican Rotunda were demolished to make way for the far larger ground-plan of the Renaissance basilica. The Mausoleum of Honorius itself was destroyed in late November 1519, in the reign of Pope Leo X. The building has never been the subject of archaeological excavation, though surviving parts of it may remain beneath the south transept of St Peter's Basilica.

== Architecture ==
The mausoleum was a rotunda with a hemispherical dome. According to Giacomo Grimaldi, it was built of Roman brick. The mausoleum connected to the basilica built on the site of Saint Peter's tomb by Constantine the Great. The southern transept of the basilica opened onto a vestibule from which one entered the rotunda.

The building's floor plan is known from a drawing in the 16th-century codex known as the Anonimo Fiorentino in the National Central Library of Florence, which also shows the adjoining Vatican Rotunda The plan suggests the Mausoleum was extremely similar to the Vatican Rotunda, though the Renaissance artist may have "regularized" the design. A "crude" likeness of the building's exterior appears in an illustration of the Nuremberg Chronicle from 1490, which shows it had exterior buttressing for the drum, which itself had large windows. The windows are recorded as having been repaired in 1463, along with the ceiling.

== Exhumations ==
Niccola della Tuccia's Chronicle records that in June 1458, while a grave was being dug in the Chapel of St Petronilla, a sarcophagus was uncovered "of very beautiful marble". (Note: Niccola dell Tuccia, Cronaca di Viterbo) Inside were two cypress-wood coffins, "one large, one small". Each coffin was silver-plated and the remains within were covered in gold cloth. Della Tuccia reports that the silver from the silver plating was 11 carats in fineness and weighed 832 contemporary pounds, while the cloth of gold weighed 16 pounds. Besides "an inscribed cross", no identifying features were discovered; nonetheless, the chronicler wrote that "it is said that they were the bodies of Constantine and one of his young sons". Since the burial appears to have been of an adult and child, and since only one child is known to have been buried in the Mausoleum of Honorius, it is possible this sarcophagus contained the coffins of Honorius's sister Galla Placidia and her son Theodosius "III". This boy, the first child of Placidia from her first marriage to Athaulf, died young and was initially interred in a church in Barcelona in a silver casket (according to Olympiodorus of Thebes) before being permanently buried in the Mausoleum of Honorius. (Note: Olympiodorus of Thebes, Fragmenta 26.i)

Marcantonio Michiel's diary contains a report on another exhumation during the demolition of the mausoleum in late November 1519. As foundations were prepared for the pillars of the new St Peter's Basilica "some antique sarcophagi were found" within one of which "was found a gold cloth wrapped around some bones, thought to be a Christian prince". This sarcophagus, which Michiel states was without an inscription, contained jewellery including "a small collar [torque?]", a crown, and a small cross. According to Michiel, the items were estimated at 3,000 ducats in value. On 23 December, Michiel's diary records that gold from the gold cloth came to eight pounds; furthermore the gold from the crown and the small cross were made into a new reliquary for the relic head of St Petronilla. The same events are noted in a letter by Pandolfo Pico to Isabella d'Este dated 26 November 1519. No other details are known about the other sarcophagi found at the same time, neither is it known whether they were Roman imperial tombs or later medieval burials.

The best-attested and most significant exhumation was on the 3 February 1544.
