= Elbeyli, İznik =

Elbeyli
- Neighbourhood
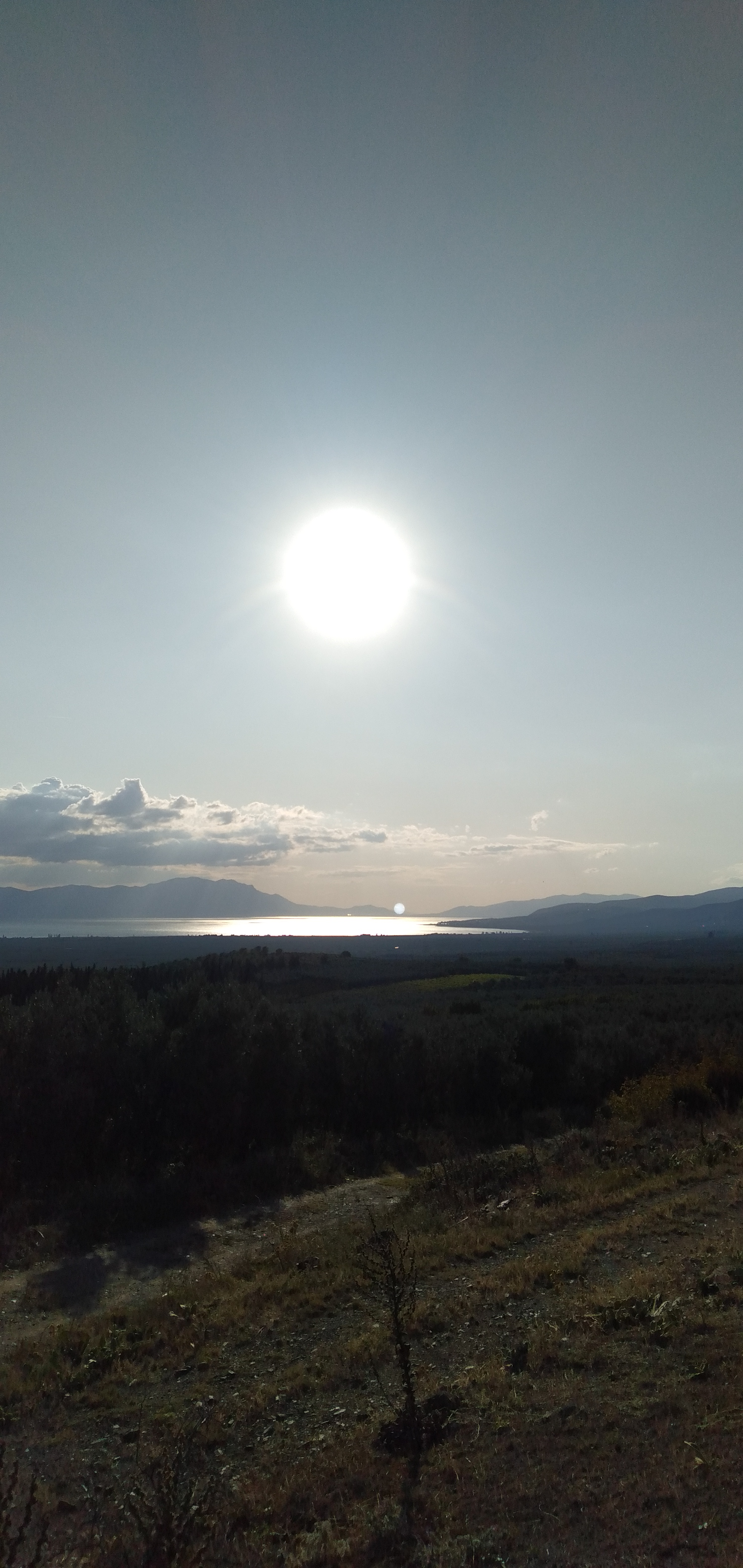

- Location within Turkey Location within Marmara
- Coordinates: 40°29′N 29°44′E
- Country: Turkey
- Province: Bursa
- District: İznik
- Elevation: 195 m (640 ft)
- Population (2022): 2,267
- Time zone: UTC+3 (TRT)
- Postal code: 16890
- Area code: 0224

Elbeyli (formerly İlbeyli) is a neighbourhood of the municipality and district of İznik, Bursa Province, Turkey. Its population is 2,267 (2022). Before the 2013 reorganisation, it was a town (belde). It is situated 7 kilometres (4.3 mi) north of İznik and 85 kilometres (53 mi) northeast of Bursa.

The settlement was founded on the ancient settlement named Liada or Linda. According to the mayor’s web page its history goes back to at least three centuries. But there is no consensus on the origin of the name which was İlbeyli during the Ottoman era. The place name probably refers to the Turkmen tribe with the same name.
