= Aureliane =

Town in ancient Bithynia

Coordinates: 40°24′17″N 29°48′32″E

Aureliane was a town of ancient Bithynia inhabited during Roman times. It was on the road an hour east of Nicaea.

Its site is located east of İznik in Asiatic Turkey.
