= Göllüce =

Göllüce can refer to:

- Göllüce, İznik
- Göllüce, Kurşunlu
