= Kaynarca =

Kaynarca may refer to:

== Places ==
- Kaynarca, Biga
- Kaynarca, Bor, a village in Bor district of Niğde Province, Turkey
- Kaynarca, Horasan
- Kaynarca, İznik
- Kaynarca, Pınarhisar, a town in Pınarhisar district, Kırklareli Province in Turkey
- Kaynarca, Sakarya, a town and district of Sakarya Province in Turkey
- Kaynarca, Pendik, a town in Pendik district of Istanbul, Turkey
- Kaynardzha, a village in northeastern Bulgaria, part of Silistra Province
- Kaynardzha Municipality, a municipality in Silistra Province, northeastern Bulgaria

== People with the surname ==
- Oktay Kaynarca (born 1965), Turkish actor
