= Çampınar =

Çampınar (literally "pine spring") is a Turkish place name and it may refer to

- Çampınar, Çelikhan - a village in Çelikhan district of Adıyaman Province
- Çampınar, Bolu - a village in Bolu central district of Bolu Province
- Çampınar, İznik
- Çampınar, Selendi - a village in Selendi district of Manisa Province
- Çampınar, Mut - a village in Mut district of Mersin Province
- Çampınar, Osmancık
- Çampınar, Akdağmadeni - a village in Akdağmadeni district of Yozgat Province
