= Nilüfer Hatun Imareti =

Museum in İznik, Turkey

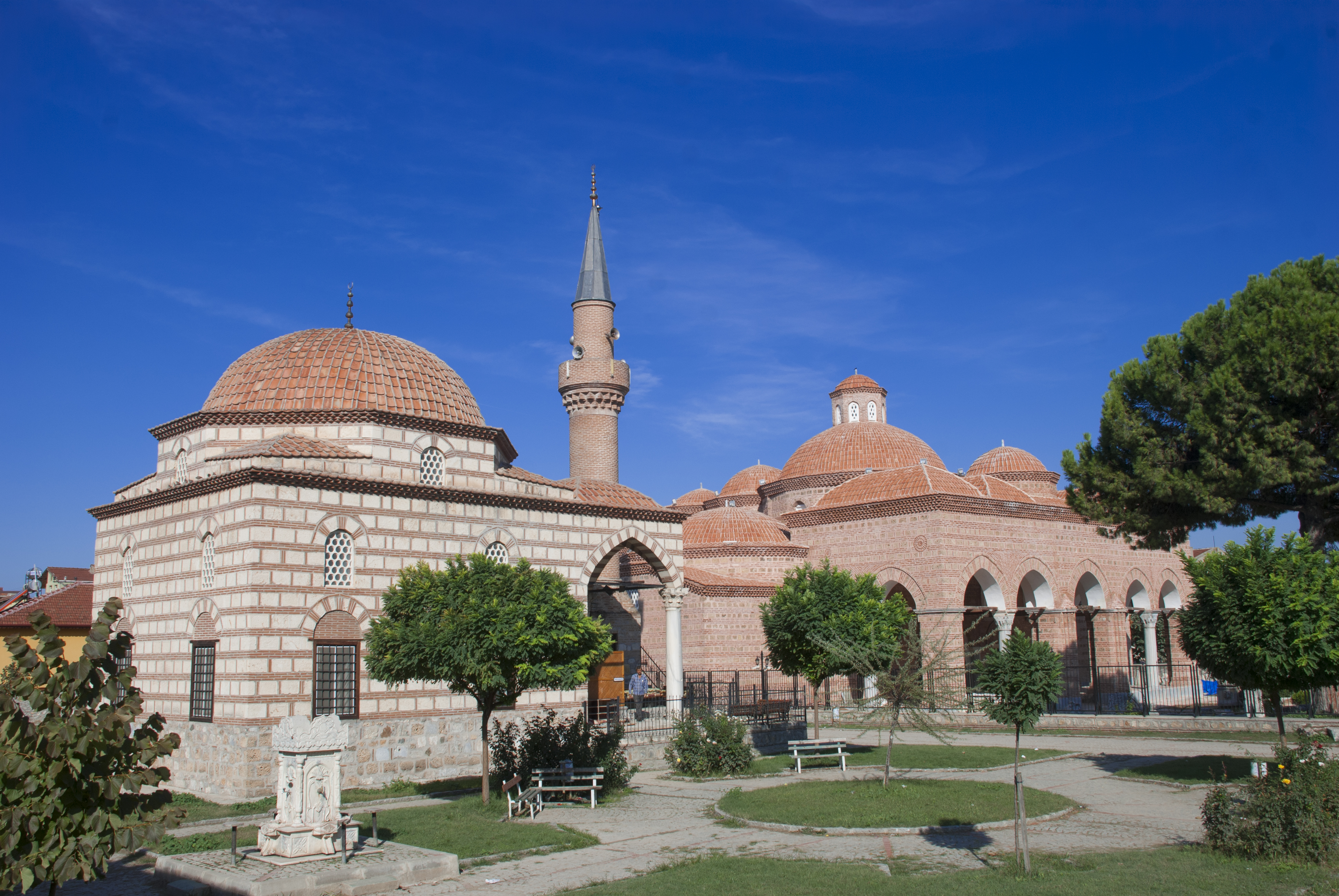
Exterior view of "Nilüfer Hatun Imareti" and mosque

Nilüfer Hatun Imareti (Turkish for "Nilüfer Hatun's Soup Kitchen"), a convent annex hospice for dervishes, now housing the Iznik Museum in İznik, Bursa Province, Turkey. This elegant building was erected in 1388 for Murad I who dedicated it to his late mother Nilüfer Hatun.

During Murad's reign Nilüfer s recognized as Valide Hatun, the first in Ottoman history to hold this title, and when she died she was buried beside her consort Orhan Gazi in Bursa.

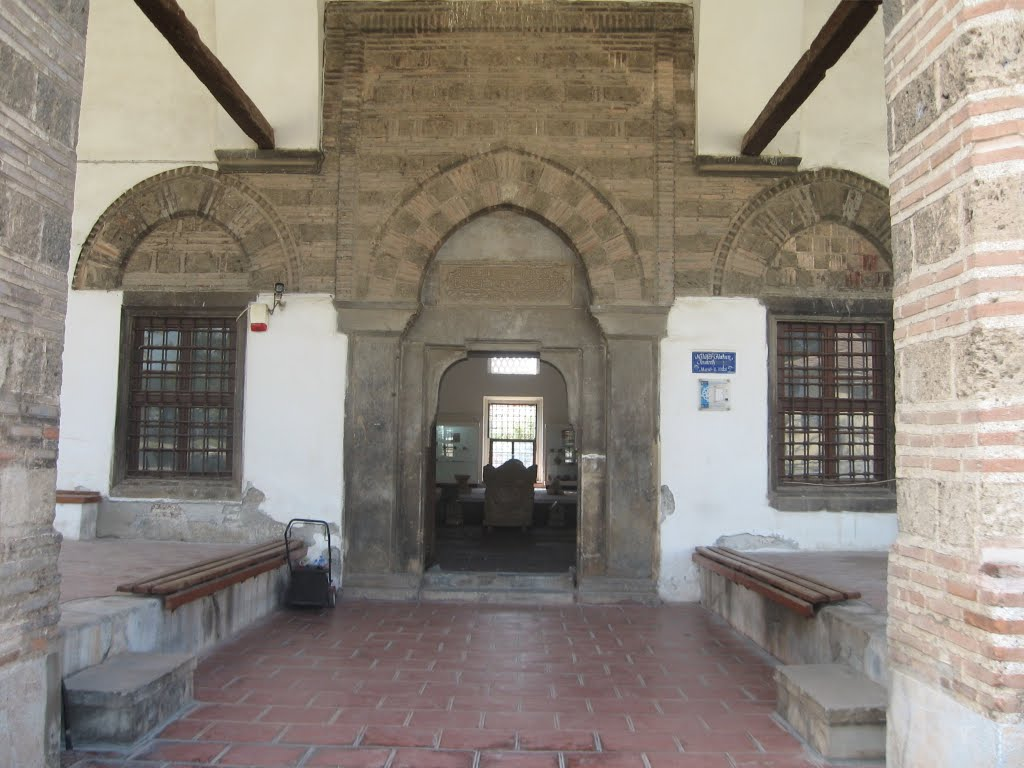
Entrance to "Nilüfer Hatun Imareti"

== Architecture ==
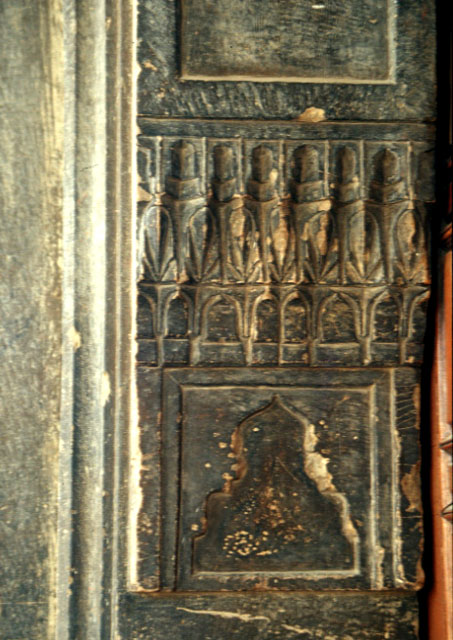
Exterior detail showing muqarnas decoration on the jamb of the main door

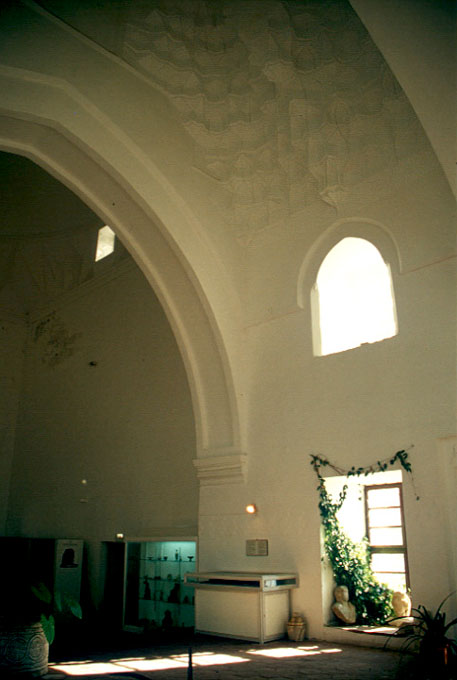
Interior view looking towards the central hall from the eyvan, showing the stalactite vault of the first dome and the great arch that separates the two rooms

The Imaret is built in single courses of stone alternating with four courses of bricks, its vaults and domes covered with ceramic tiles. The building is preceded by an open ended porch of five bays, with five arches in front and two on either side, carried by a succession of alternating piers and columns. The central bay is surmounted by a small dome, while the four side bays are covered with flat topped cross vaults. Inside, the main hall is a square surmounted by a lofty dome carried on the belt of Turkish triangles. On either side there are two large rooms with much lover domes; these have large ocaklar, or hearths, and were used as both kitchens and dormitories. In front of the main hall is another hall of similar size divided into two sections by a great arch; this served as a mescit, as evidenced by the mihrab niche in the south wall.

== Uses and restoration ==
The building originally served as a hostel for the Ahi Brotherhood of Virtue. This was a religious and fraternal society formed by the craft guilds in Anatolia during the Seljuk period. Ibn Battuta also wrote about the hospitality her received at one of the Ahi lodges in Anatolia.

Nilüfer's foundations was later used as an imaret, or refectory, serving free food to the poor of Iznik. The building was abandoned for many years but was restored in 1955. Today it houses the Iznik Museum, with archaeological and ethnological collections, including an exhibition of the famous Iznik kilns.

== See also ==
- Ottoman Empire
- Nilüfer Hatun
- Murad I
- Ottoman Architecture
