= Haji Özbek Mosque =

Mosque in İznik, Turkey

Coordinates: 40.42933°N 29.72312°E

- Hacı Özbek Camii
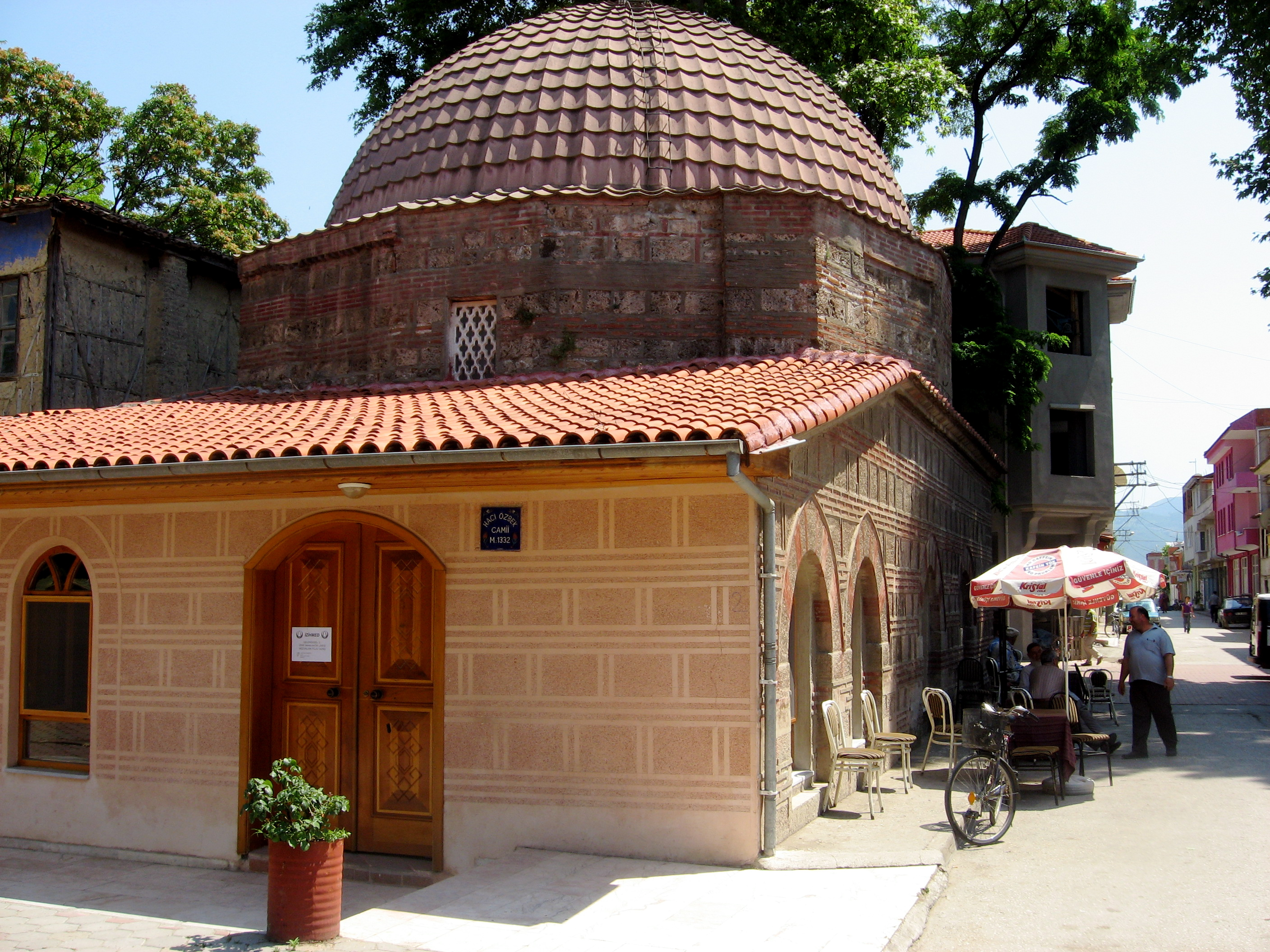

Religion
- Affiliation: Islam

Location
- Location: Iznik, Turkey
- Interactive map of Haji Özbek Mosque

Architecture
- Type: Mosque
- Style: Islamic, Ottoman architecture
- Completed: 1333; 693 years ago

Specifications
- Length: 7.92 m (26.0 ft)
- Width: 7.92 m (26.0 ft)
- Dome: Hemispheric

Haji Özbek Mosque (Turkish: Hacı Özbek Camii) is a historical Ottoman mosque in İznik, Turkey.

== The Mosque ==
The Haji Özbek Mosque (1333) in Iznik, which was the first important centre of Ottoman art, is a prime example of Ottoman single-domed mosque, which illustrates a combination of Byzantine building techniques and Muslim needs. According to the inscriptive plaque (kitabe) above a window, the mosque was built by Haci Özbek bin Muhammed in the year 1333 (734 A.H.), two years after the Ottoman conquest of İznik by the Ottoman sultan Orhan I. The building is a single-unit mosque composed of a square hall crowned with a dome, which is eight metres (26 ft) in diameter. The drum of the dome of the mosque is dodecagonal and adorned with a band of triangular planes on the interior. The mosque consists of a triple layer of brick with alternating layers of individually cut stone separated by vertically laid brick.

In 1939 the three-bay portico preceding the hall to the west was demolished, to make space for road expansion. The portico, was roofed with a barrel vault to the south and a mirror vault on the north. In the place of the demolished portico, a new enclosed portico was added to the northern side of the building in the year 1959. The mosque never had a minaret. The ornamental details of the interior have been lost under the layers of plaster. For the construction of the mosque, brick and rubble stone, was used, together with saw-toothed brick cornices at the top of the walls and terracotta tiles were used on the brick dome.
