= Ömerli, İznik =

Village in Turkey

Ömerli
- Neighbourhood
- Country: Turkey
- Province: Bursa
- District: İznik
- Population (2022): 283
- Time zone: UTC+3 (TRT)

Ömerli is a neighbourhood in the municipality and district of İznik, Bursa Province in Turkey. Its population is 283 (2022).
