= Gürmüzlü, İznik =

Village in Turkey

Gürmüzlü
- Neighbourhood
- Location in Turkey Gürmüzlü (Marmara)
- Coordinates: 40°30′39″N 29°45′33″E
- Country: Turkey
- Province: Bursa
- District: İznik
- Population (2022): 217
- Time zone: UTC+3 (TRT)

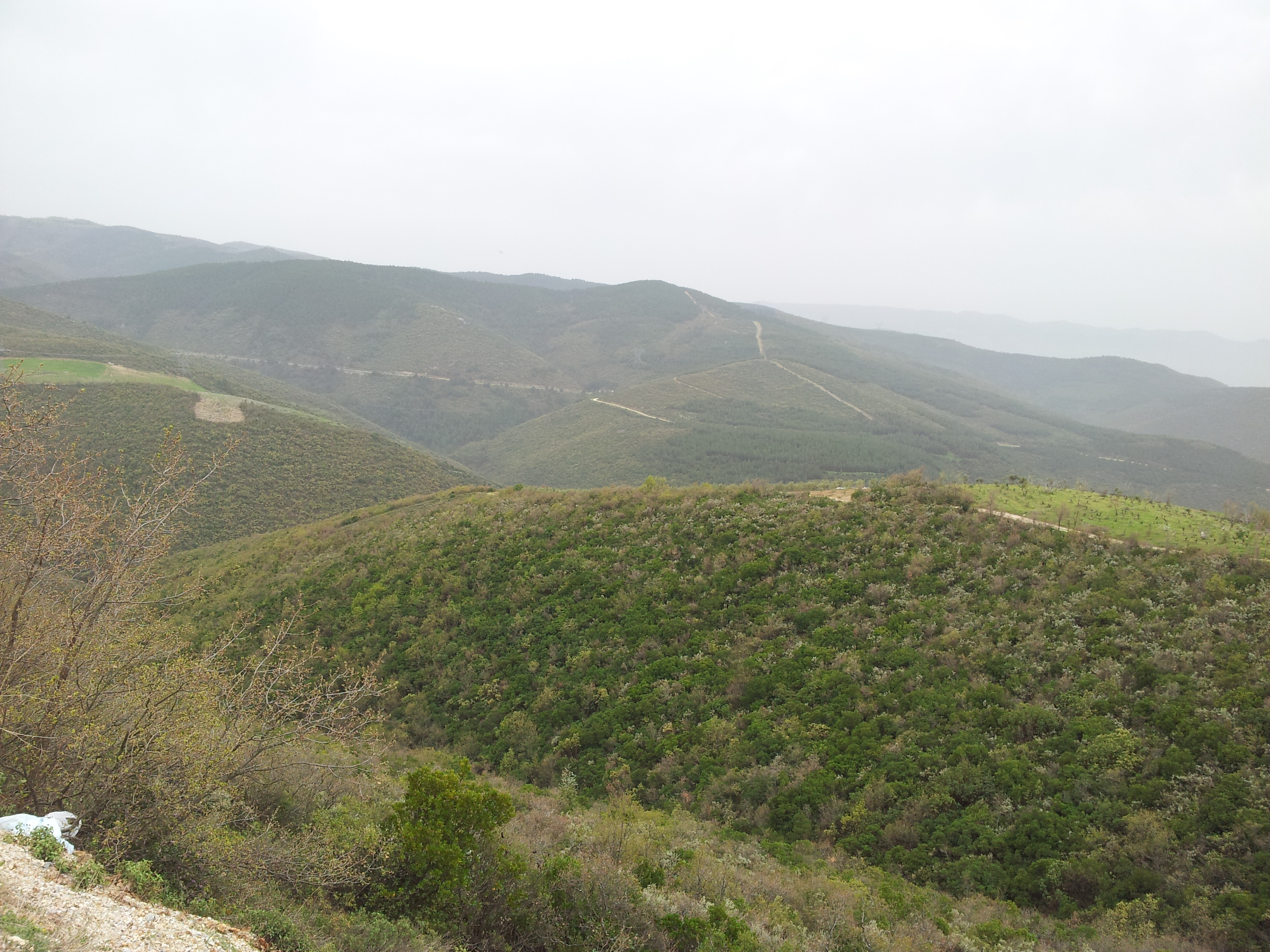
Gürmüzlü İznik Bursa, Turkey

Gürmüzlü is a neighbourhood in the municipality and district of İznik, Bursa Province in Turkey. Its population is 217 (2022).
