= Hagia Sophia, İznik =

Mosque in İznik, Turkey

Hagia Sophia
- Ayasofya (Turkish); Ἁγία Σοφία (Greek)
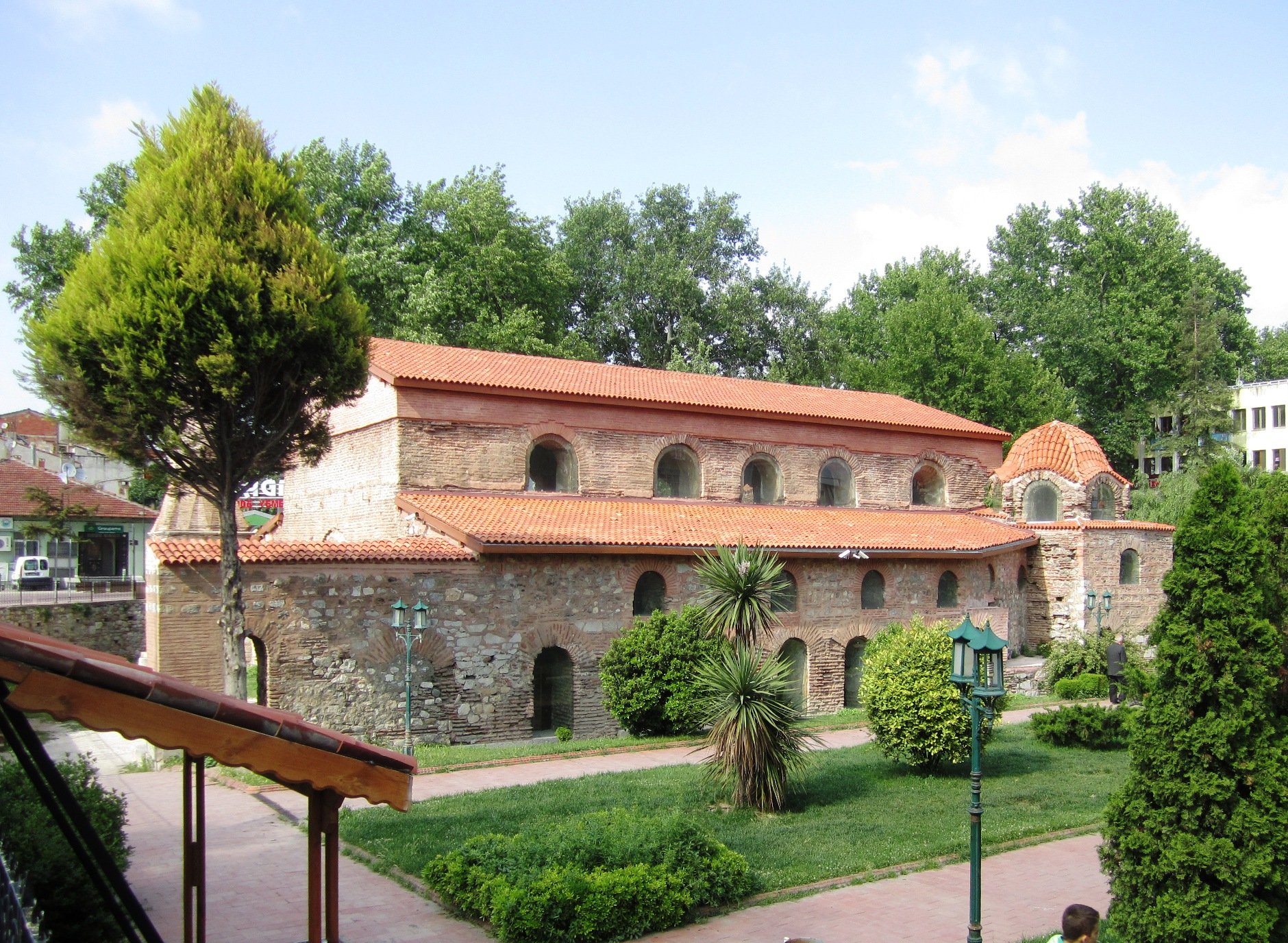
- A view of the Hagia Sophia of Nicaea after restoration in 2012.

Religion
- Affiliation: Islam
- Status: Eastern Orthodox church (325–1331); Mosque (1331–1935; 2011–present); Museum (1935–2011)

Location
- Location: İznik, Turkey
- Interactive map of Hagia Sophia
- Coordinates: 40°25′45″N 29°43′13″E

Architecture
- Style: Byzantine
- Groundbreaking: 325 (as a church)
- Completed: 1065
- Inscriptions: The Holy Wisdom, a reference to the second person of the Trinity, or Jesus Christ
- Materials: Roman brick

Website
- Official website

Hagia Sophia mosque (lit. 'the Holy Wisdom'; Ancient Greek: Ἁγία Σοφία, romanized: Hagía Sophía; Turkish: Ayasofya) in İznik (Nicaea) in Bursa Province, Turkey, was built as a Byzantine-era basilican church. Converted into the Orhan Mosque (Turkish: Orhan Camii) after the Ottoman conquest, it was turned into a museum in 1935. The church is now once again in service as a mosque. It is in the town centre of İznik, within the old walled area.

== History ==
The first church built on the site was constructed in the 4th century. The church was later rebuilt under the patronage of Emperor Justinian I in the mid-6th century. In 787, it hosted the Second Council of Nicaea, which officially ended the first period of Byzantine Iconoclasm. The Justinian-era church was destroyed by an earthquake in the 11th century and the present structure was erected around 1065 over the ruins of the older one.

The Church of Hagia Sophia was converted into the Orhan Mosque following the fall of Nicaea to the Ottoman Turks led by Orhan Ghazi in 1331. It continued to operate as a mosque until 1935, when it was designated as a museum under the regime of Mustafa Kemal Atatürk. In November 2011 it was again converted into a mosque.

== Architecture ==
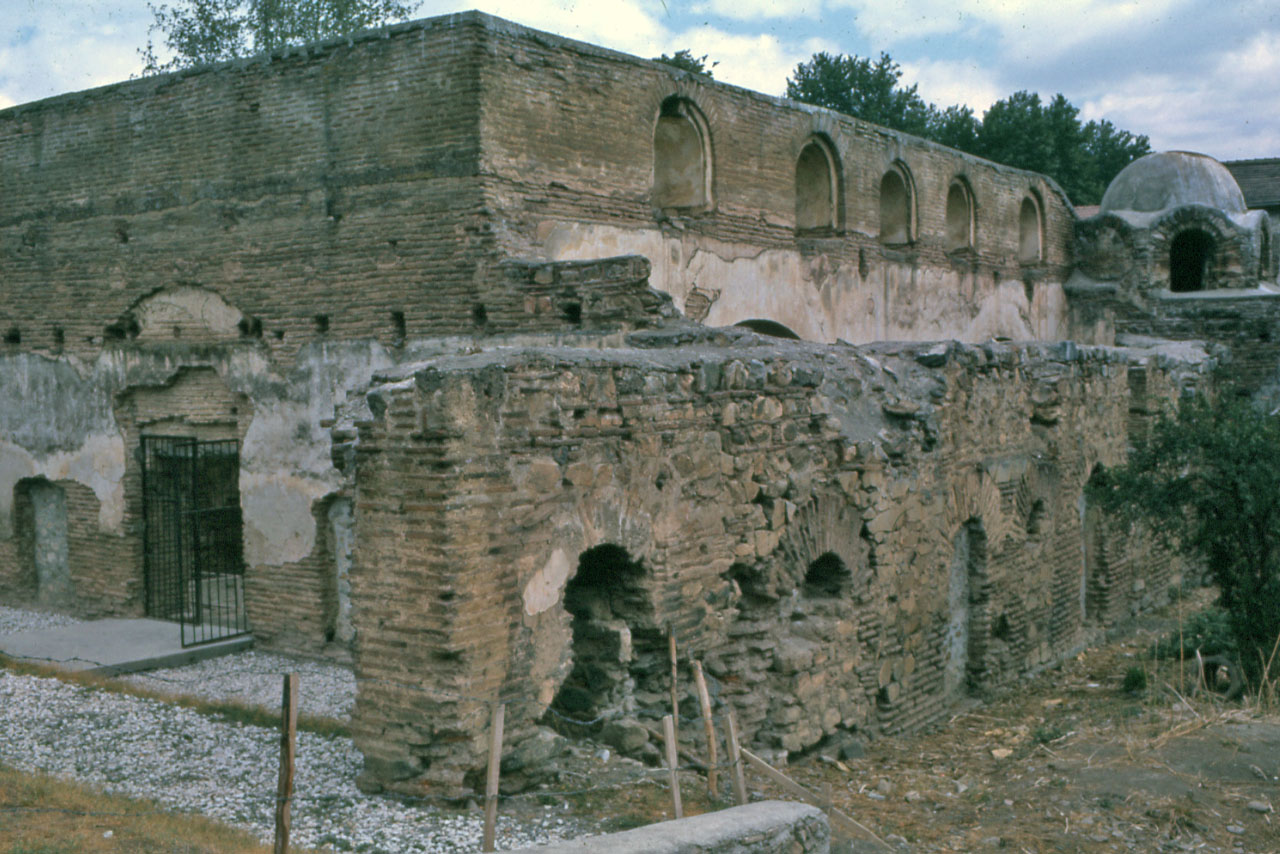
Remains of the Hagia Sophia in 1962 (photo by Paolo Monti)

The current basilican structure, much of which dates to the 1065 reconstruction of the church, consists of a central nave with two side aisles. Prior to its remodelling under the Ottomans, the church had two rows of triple arcades on columns that carried a clerestory wall with five windows. Following the building's conversion to a mosque in the 14th century, it underwent renovations that included the addition of a mihrab. During the 16th-century reign of Süleyman the Magnificent, the church was restored after a disastrous fire and a minaret was constructed. The architect Mimar Sinan was also commissioned around this time to design decorations to adorn the walls of the mosque.

The restoration (or rebuilding) of such a historic church so that it could be reused as a mosque was - and remains - very controversial. The work was carried out between 2007 and 2011.

== Gallery ==
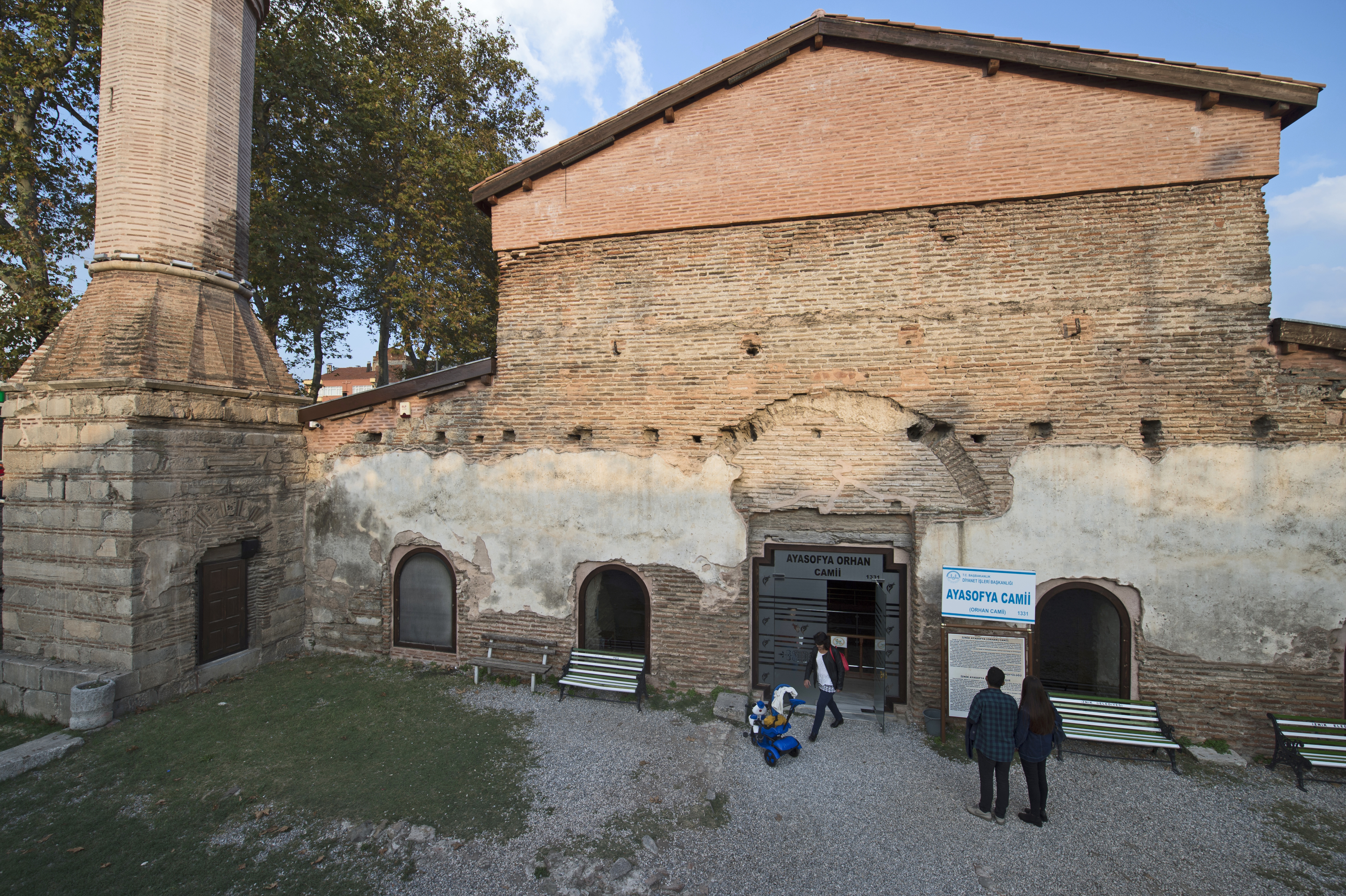
Front of Hagia Sophia in İznik

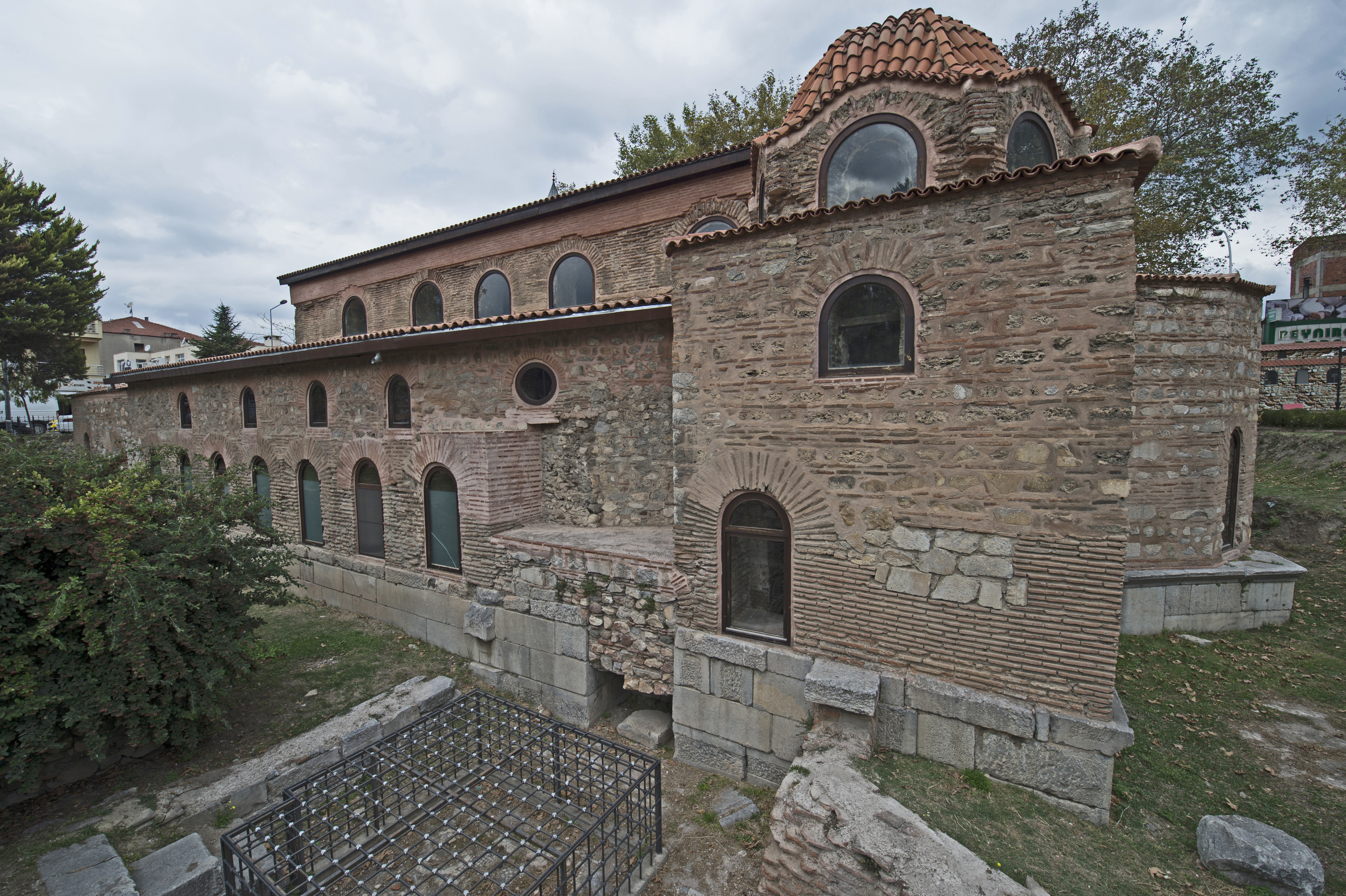
Exterior of Hagia Sophia in İznik

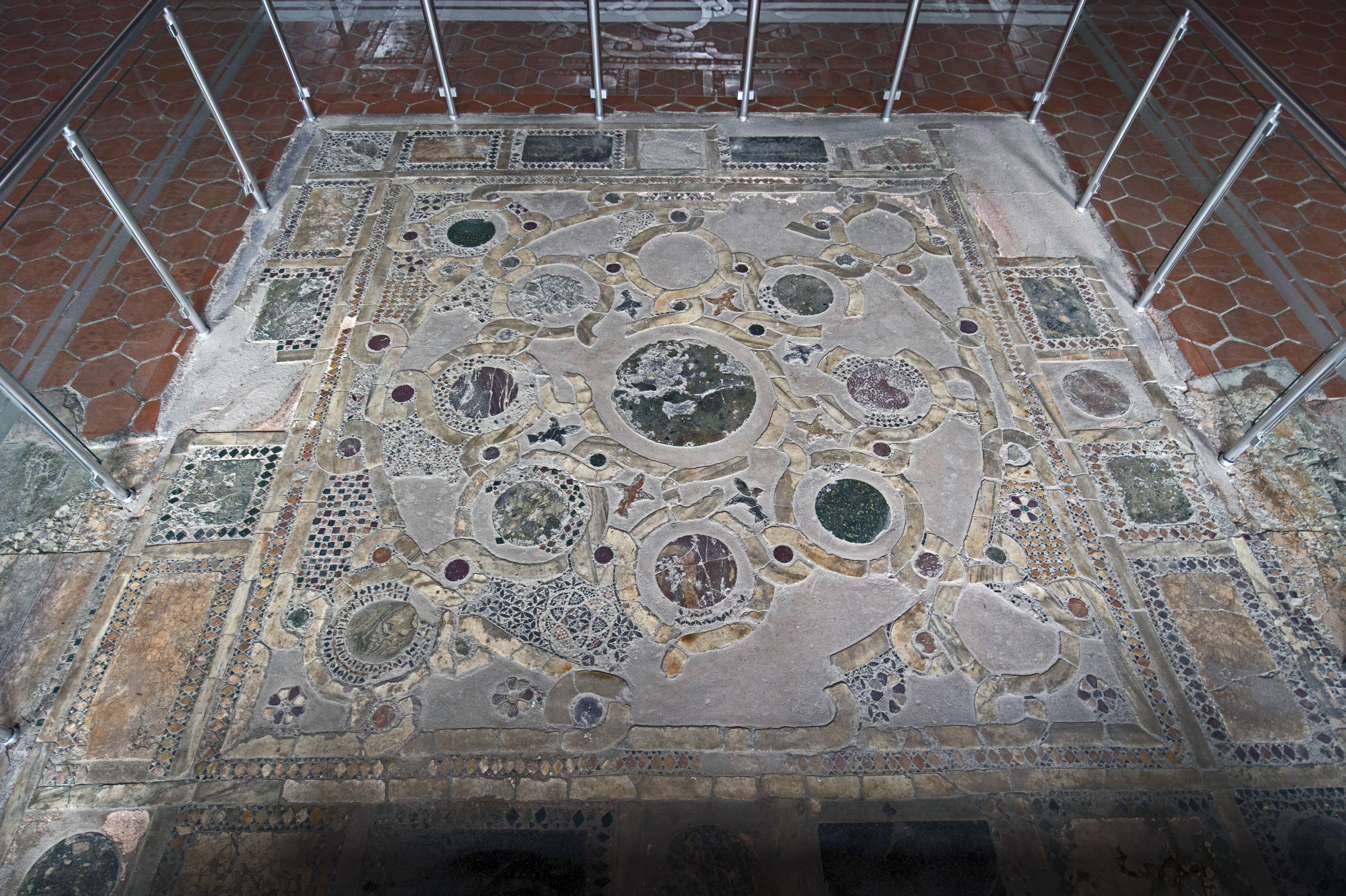
Opus sectile floor in entrance of Hagia Sophia in İznik

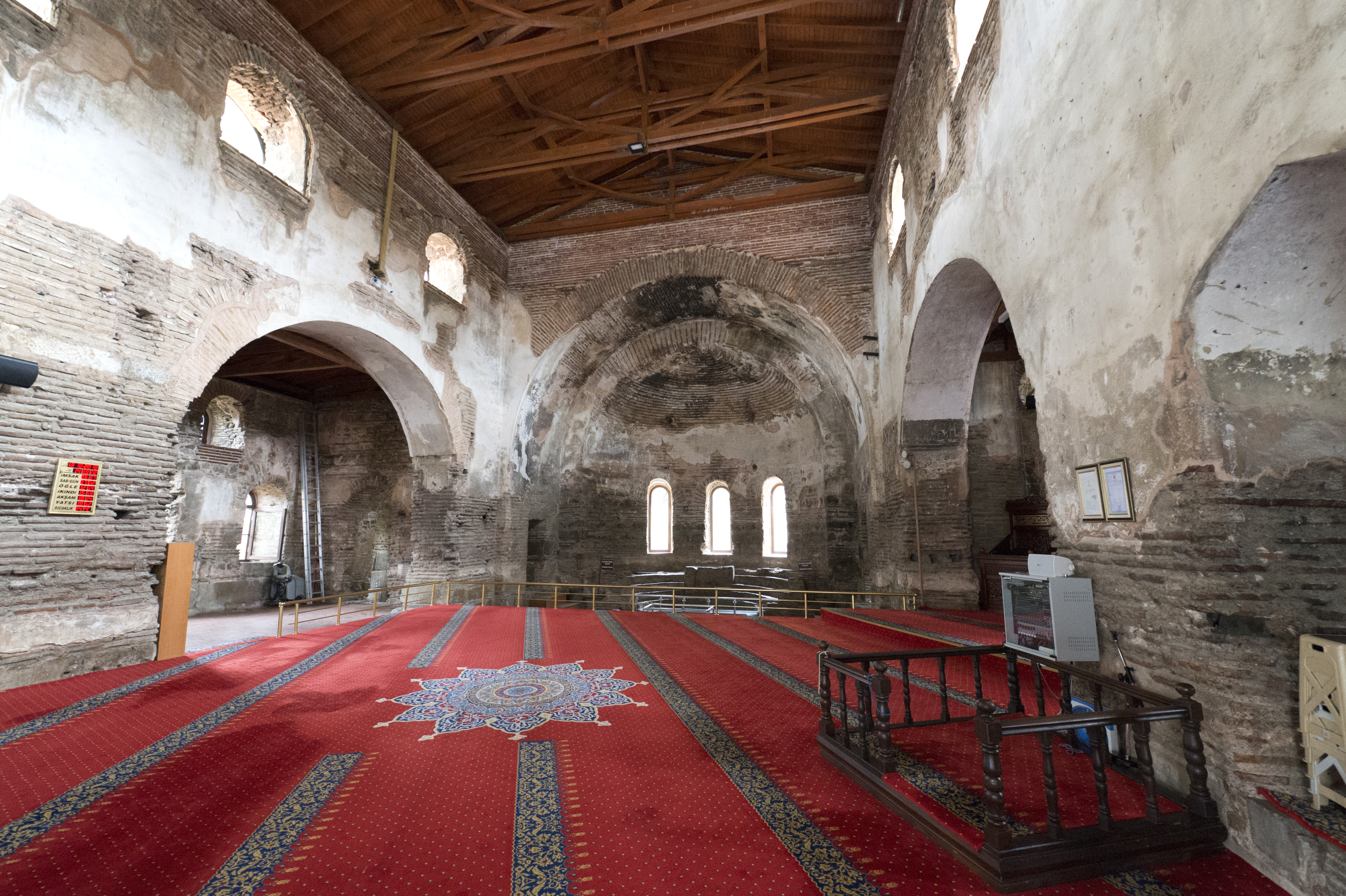
Interior of Hagia Sophia in Iznik

Synthronon in choir area of Hagia Sophia in İznik

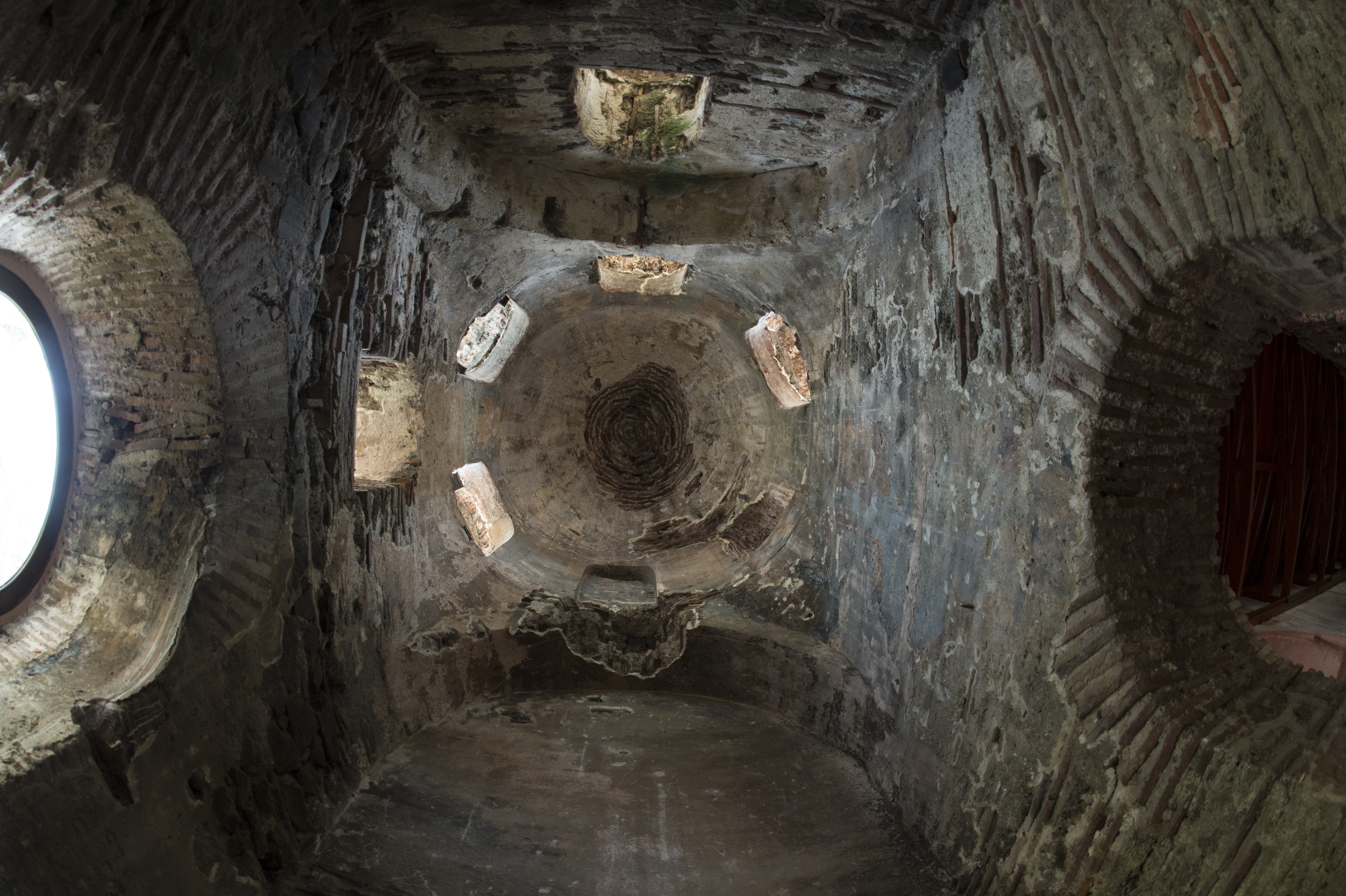
View of secondary dome in Hagia Sophia in İznik

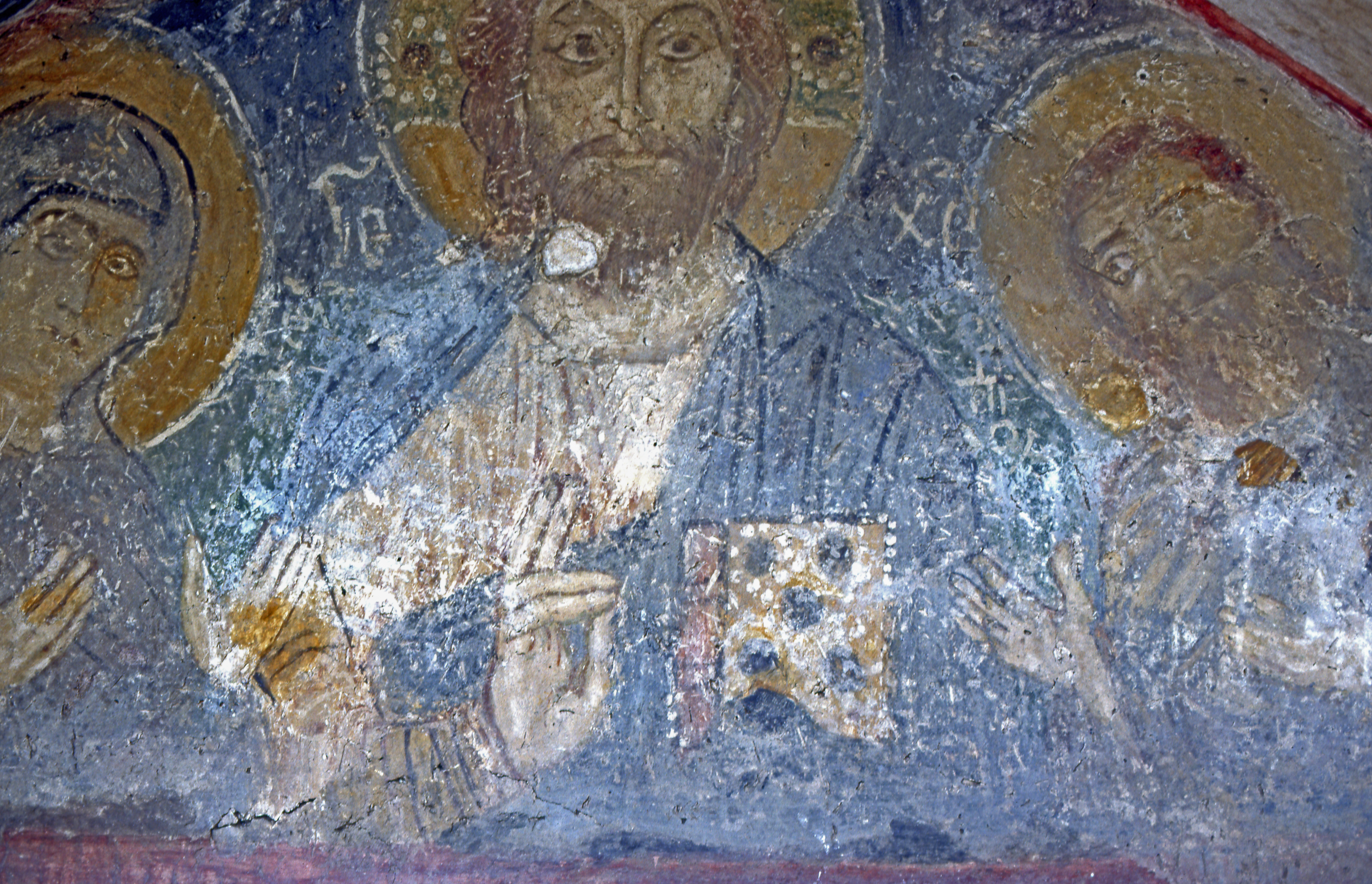
Fresco in Hagia Sophia in İznik

== See also ==
- Conversion of non-Islamic places of worship into mosques
- Hagia Sophia, Istanbul
- Second Council of Nicaea
