= Liada =

Town of ancient Bithynia

Coordinates: 40°33′36″N 29°40′07″E

Liada was a town of ancient Bithynia, on the road from Nicomedia to Nicaea.

Its site is located near Sarıağıl, in Asiatic Turkey.
