= Elmalı, İznik =

Village in Turkey

Elmalı
- Neighbourhood
- Country: Turkey
- Province: Bursa
- District: İznik
- Population (2022): 340
- Time zone: UTC+3 (TRT)

Elmalı is a neighbourhood in the municipality and district of İznik, Bursa Province in Turkey. Its population is 340 (2022).
