= Çandarlı, İznik =

Village in Turkey

Çandarlı
- Neighbourhood
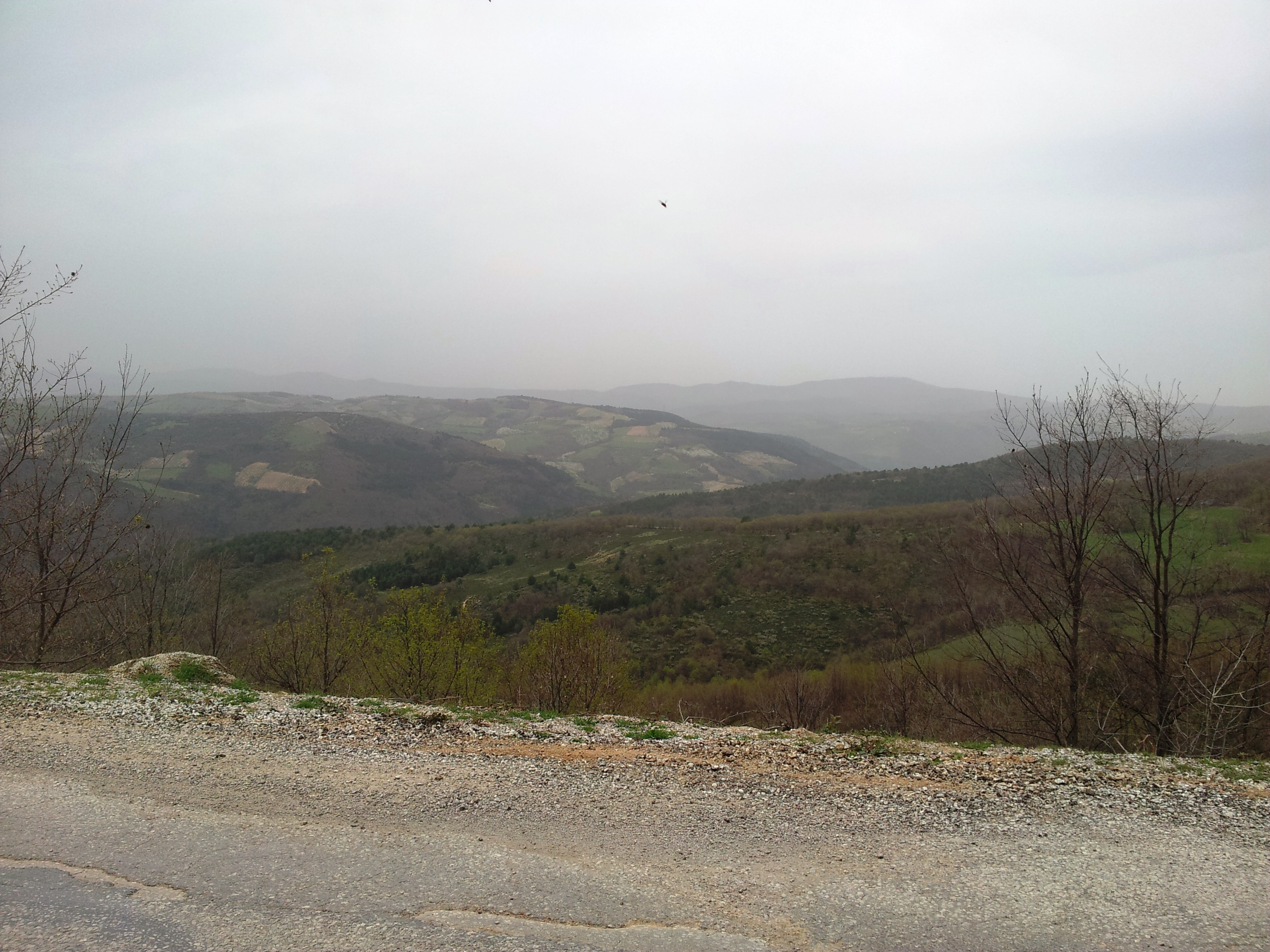
- Çandarlı Skyline, April 2013

- Location within Turkey Location within Marmara
- Coordinates: 40°32′21″N 29°50′3″E
- Country: Turkey
- Province: Bursa
- District: İznik
- Population (2022): 139
- Time zone: UTC+3 (TRT)

Çandarlı is a neighbourhood in the municipality and district of İznik, Bursa Province in Turkey. Its population is 139 (2022).
