= Aydınlar, İznik =

Village in Turkey

Aydınlar
- Neighbourhood
- Location in Turkey Aydınlar (Marmara)
- Coordinates: 40.3732°N 29.6439°E
- Country: Turkey
- Province: Bursa
- District: İznik
- Population (2022): 228
- Time zone: UTC+3 (TRT)

Aydınlar is a neighbourhood in the municipality and district of İznik, Bursa Province in Turkey. Its population is 228 (2022).
