= Süleymaniye, İznik =

Village in Turkey

Süleymaniye
- Neighbourhood
- Location within Turkey Location within Marmara
- Coordinates: 40.57°N 29.679°E
- Country: Turkey
- Province: Bursa
- District: İznik
- Population (2022): 38
- Time zone: UTC+3 (TRT)

Süleymaniye is a neighbourhood in the municipality and district of İznik, Bursa Province in Turkey. Its population is 38 (2022).
