= Bayındır, İznik =

Village in Turkey

Bayındır
- Neighbourhood
- Location in Turkey Bayındır (Marmara)
- Coordinates: 40.5268°N 29.5451°E
- Country: Turkey
- Province: Bursa
- District: İznik
- Population (2022): 189
- Time zone: UTC+3 (TRT)

Bayındır is a neighbourhood in the municipality and district of İznik, Bursa Province in Turkey. Its population is 189 (2022).
