= Boyalıca, İznik =

Boyalıca
- Neighbourhood
- Location in Turkey Boyalıca (Marmara)
- Coordinates: 40°29′N 29°34′E
- Country: Turkey
- Province: Bursa
- District: İznik
- Elevation: 90 m (300 ft)
- Population (2022): 2,152
- Time zone: UTC+3 (TRT)
- Postal code: 16870
- Area code: 0224

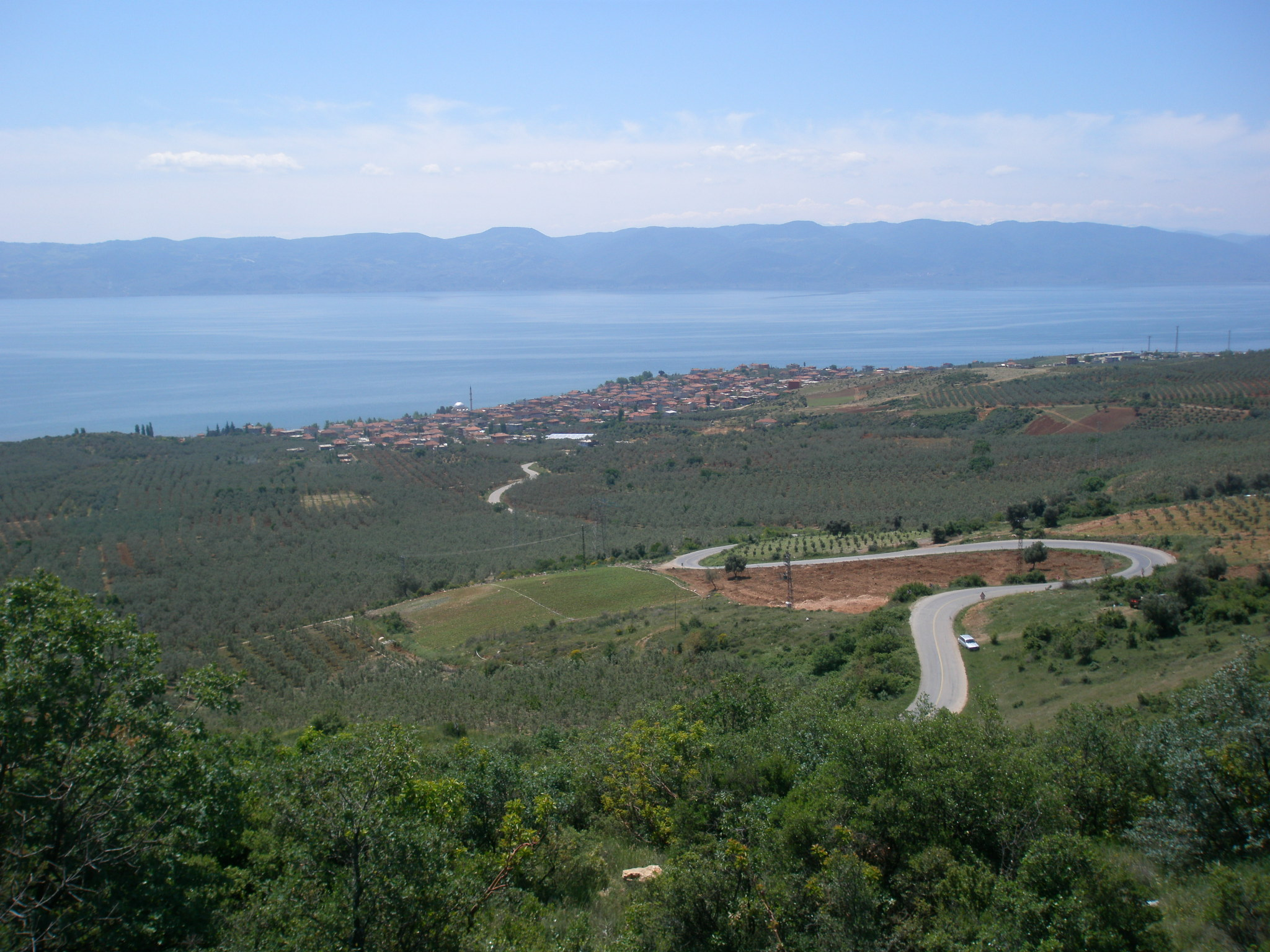

Boyalıca is a neighbourhood of the municipality and district of İznik, Bursa Province, Turkey. Its population is 2,152 (2022). Before the 2013 reorganisation, it was a town (belde).

== Geography ==
Boyalıca is on the northern coast of Lake İznik. İznik is also situated on the coast of the same lake, 18 kilometres (11 mi) east of Boyalıca. The distance to Bursa is 78 kilometres (48 mi).

== History ==
During Ottoman Empire era Boyalıca had a mixed population of Turks (who called themselves as Manav) and Greeks who were the fishermen of the lake. According to legend, the name of Boyalıca is a corrupt form of Buyalı. (Yalı means "waterfront"). After Russo-Turkish War (1877-1878) Turkish refugees from Bulgaria were settled in Boyalıca. After the Population exchange agreement between Turkey and Greece following the Turkish War of Independence in 1920s, Greeks left Boyalıca. In 1989, during the ethnic cleansing years in Bulgaria, another wave of Turkish families from Bulgaria were also settled in Boyalıca, but after Bulgarian government changed policy towards Turks, most of them returned. (See Turks in Bulgaria) In the same year Boyalıca was declared a seat of township.

== Economy ==
The town economy depends heavily on the farming of olive. Fishing and animal husbandry are other economic activities. Presently, once common sericulture plays no role in economy.
