= İhsaniye, İznik =

Village in Turkey

İhsaniye
- Neighbourhood
- Location in Turkey İhsaniye (Marmara)
- Coordinates: 40°27′31″N 29°50′03″E
- Country: Turkey
- Province: Bursa
- District: İznik
- Population (2022): 48
- Time zone: UTC+3 (TRT)

İhsaniye is a neighbourhood in the municipality and district of İznik, Bursa Province in Turkey. Its population is 48 (2022).
