= Yürükler, İznik =

Village in Turkey

Yürükler
- Neighbourhood
- Location in Turkey Yürükler (Marmara)
- Coordinates: 40°32′2″N 29°37′16″E
- Country: Turkey
- Province: Bursa
- District: İznik
- Population (2022): 301
- Time zone: UTC+3 (TRT)

Yürükler is a neighbourhood in the municipality and district of İznik, Bursa Province in Turkey. Its population is 301 (2022).
