= Çampınar, İznik =

Village in Turkey

Çampınar
- Neighbourhood
- Location in Turkey Çampınar (Marmara)
- Country: Turkey
- Province: Bursa
- District: İznik
- Population (2022): 83
- Time zone: UTC+3 (TRT)

Çampınar is a neighbourhood in the municipality and district of İznik, Bursa Province in Turkey. Its population is 83 (2022).
