= Kaynarca, İznik =

Village in Turkey

Kaynarca
- Neighbourhood
- Country: Turkey
- Province: Bursa
- District: İznik
- Population (2022): 644
- Time zone: UTC+3 (TRT)

Kaynarca is a neighbourhood in the municipality and district of İznik, Bursa Province in Turkey. Its population is 644 (2022).
