= Sarıağıl, İznik =

Village in Turkey

Sarıağıl
- Neighbourhood
- Location in Turkey Sarıağıl (Marmara)
- Coordinates: 40.55765°N 29.66587°E
- Country: Turkey
- Province: Bursa
- District: İznik
- Population (2022): 181
- Time zone: UTC+3 (TRT)

Sarıağıl is a neighbourhood in the municipality and district of İznik, Bursa Province in Turkey. Its population is 181 (2022).
