= Göllüce, İznik =

Village in Turkey

Göllüce
- Neighbourhood
- Location in Turkey Göllüce (Marmara)
- Coordinates: 40°22′23″N 29°35′28″E
- Country: Turkey
- Province: Bursa
- District: İznik
- Population (2022): 1,006
- Time zone: UTC+3 (TRT)

Göllüce is a neighbourhood in the municipality and district of İznik, Bursa Province in Turkey. Its population is 1,006 (2022).
