= Nicaea =

Ancient Greek city of Asia Minor

- Νίκαια (Ancient Greek)
- Nikaia
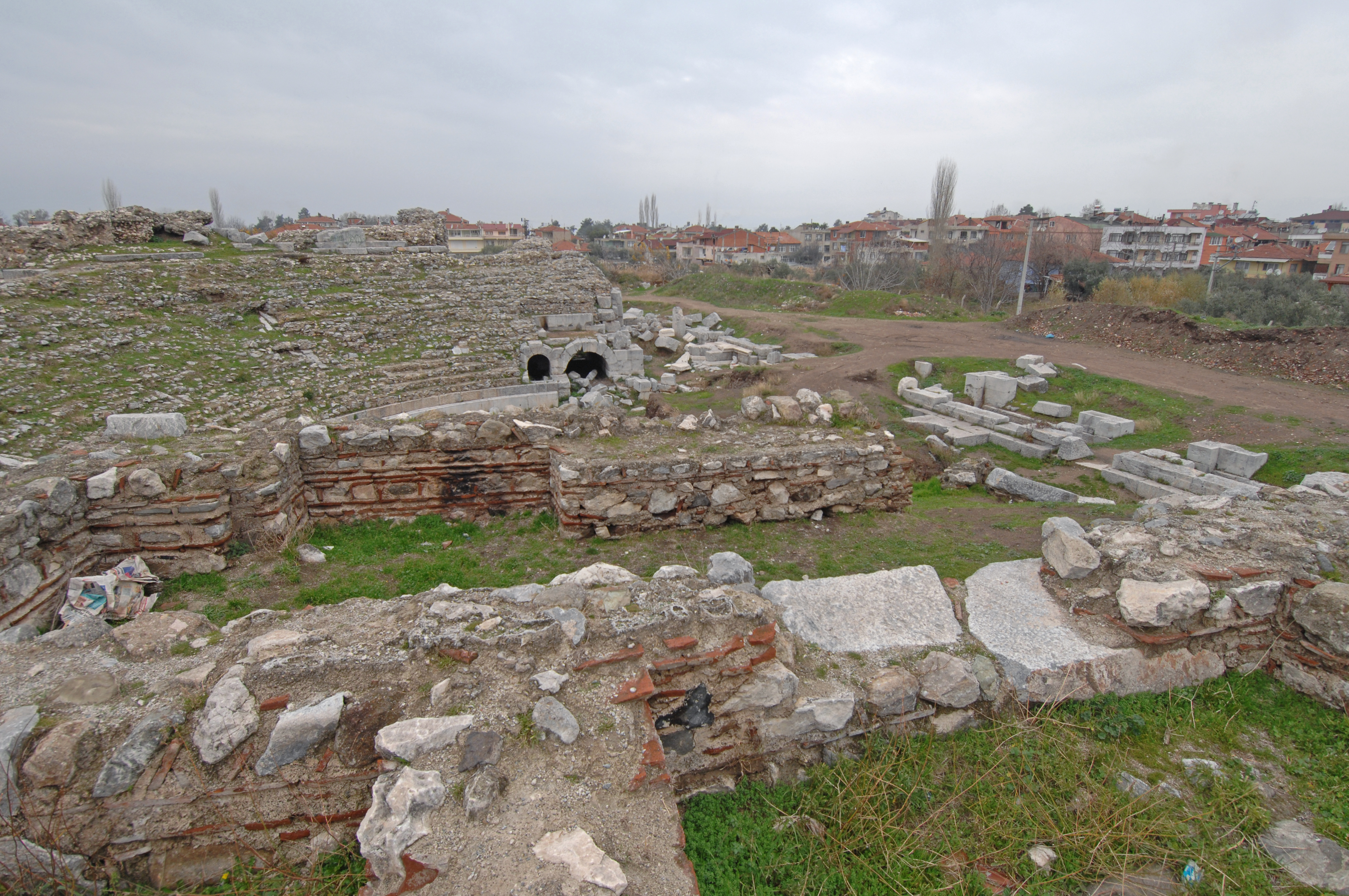
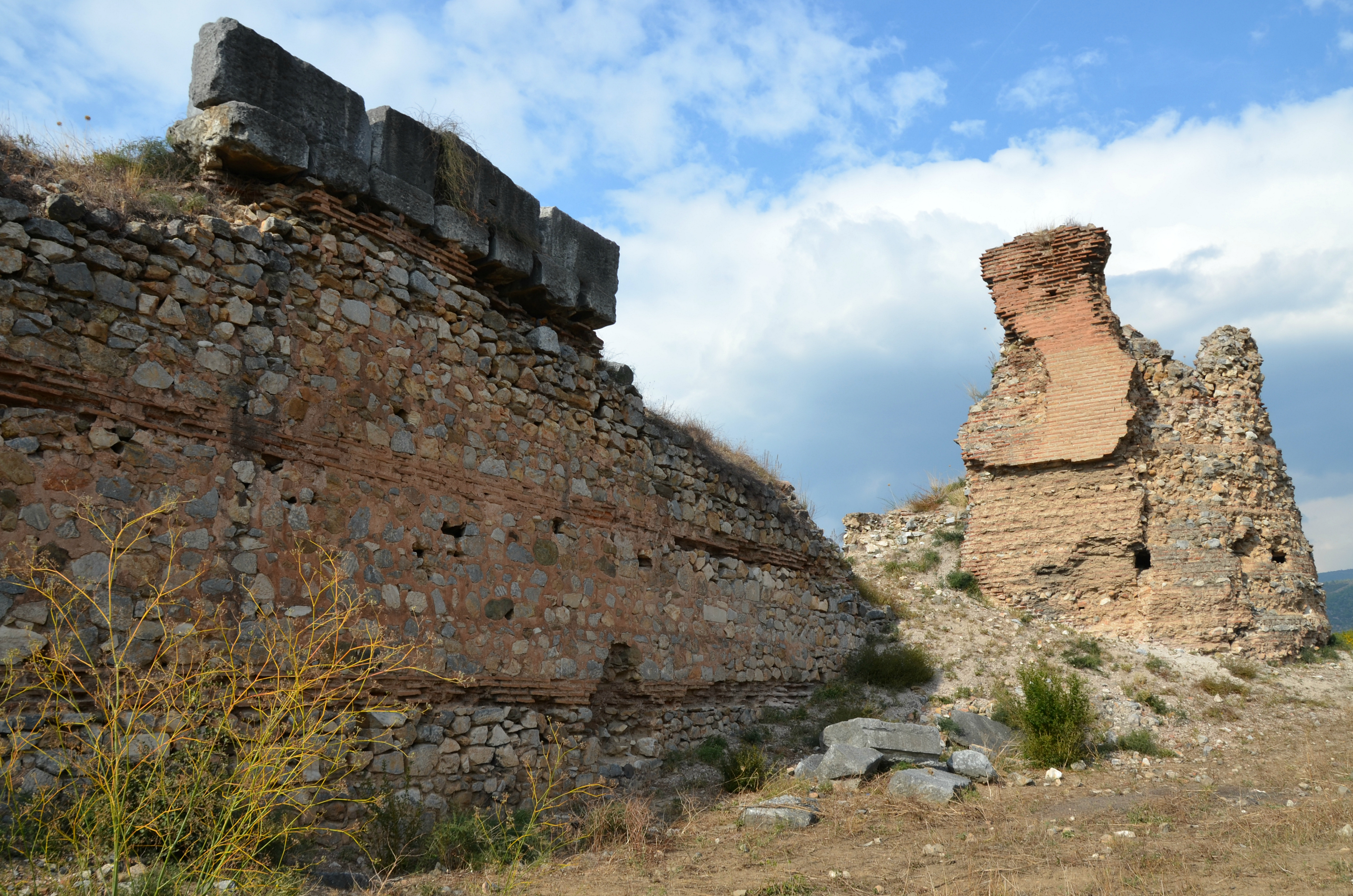
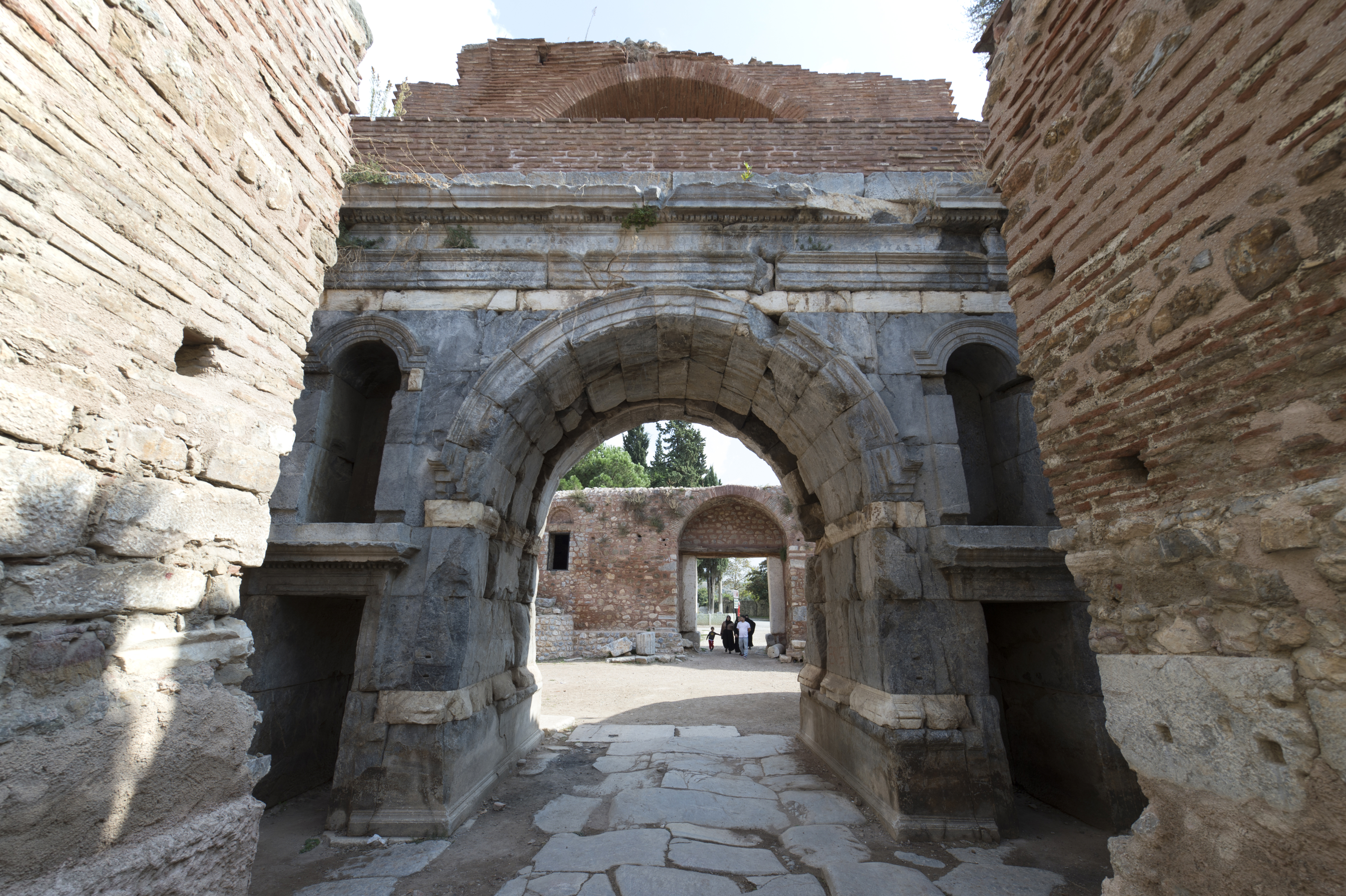
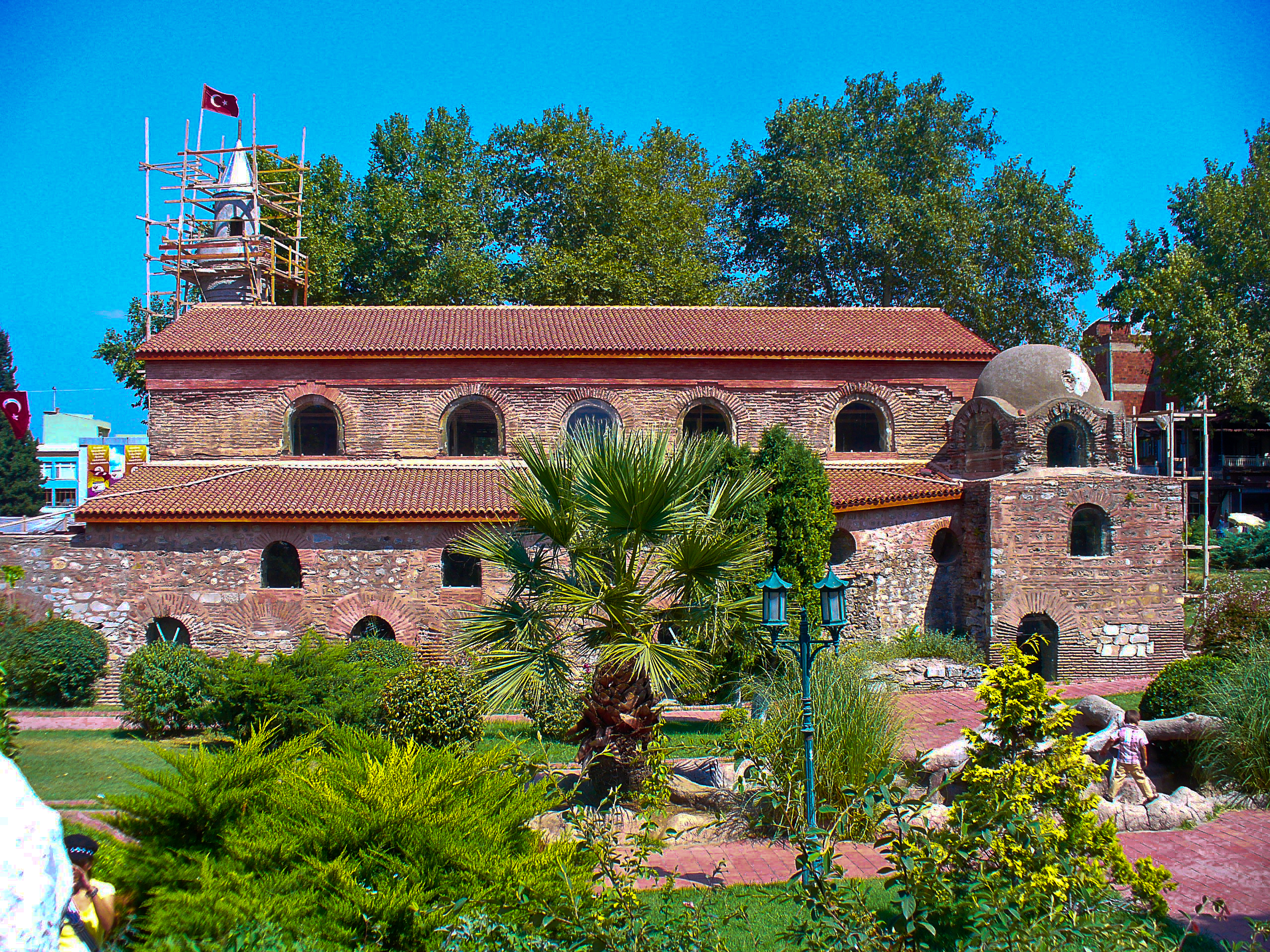
- Ruins of the Roman Theatre; Byzantine-era city wall • Lefke Gate; Orhan Mosque (formerly Hagia Sophia)

- Location within Marmara Location within Turkey
- 40°25.74′N 29°43.17′E
- Type: Settlement
- Cultures: Ancient Greek, Roman, Byzantine, Ottoman
- Location: İznik, Bursa Province, Turkey
- Region: Bithynia

History
- Built: c. 316 – 315 BC
- Built by: Antigonus I Monophthalmus
- Event(s): First and Second Council of Nicaea

Site notes
- Area: 145 ha (360 acres)

Nicaea (also spelled Nicæa or Nicea, /naɪˈsiːə/ ny-SEE-ə; Latin: [niːˈkae̯.a]), also known as Nikaia (Ancient Greek: Νίκαια, Attic: [nǐːkai̯a], Koine: [ˈnikεa]) or Nice (/ˈnaɪs/ or /ˈniːs/), was an ancient Greek city in the northwestern Anatolian region of Bithynia.

It was the site of the First and Second Councils of Nicaea (the first and seventh Ecumenical councils in the early history of the Christian Church). The Nicene Creed, which was composed at the First Council, takes its name from the city. It was also the capital city of the Empire of Nicaea following the Fourth Crusade in 1204, until the recapture of Constantinople by the Byzantines in 1261. Nicaea was also the capital of the Ottomans from 1331 to 1335.

The ancient city is located within the modern Turkish city of İznik (whose modern name derives from Nicaea's), and is situated in a fertile basin at the eastern end of Lake Ascanius, bounded by ranges of hills to the north and south. It is situated with its west wall rising from the lake itself, providing both protection from siege from that direction, as well as a source of supplies which would be difficult to cut off. The lake is large enough that it could not be blockaded from the land easily, and the city was large enough to make any attempt to reach the harbour from shore-based siege weapons very difficult.

The ancient city is surrounded on all sides by 5 kilometres (3 mi) of walls about 10 metres (33 ft) high. These are in turn surrounded by a double ditch on the land portions, and also included over 100 towers in various locations. Large gates on the three landbound sides of the walls provided the only entrance to the city. Today, the walls have been pierced in many places for roads, but much of the early work survives; as a result, it is a tourist destination.

== History ==
=== Early history ===
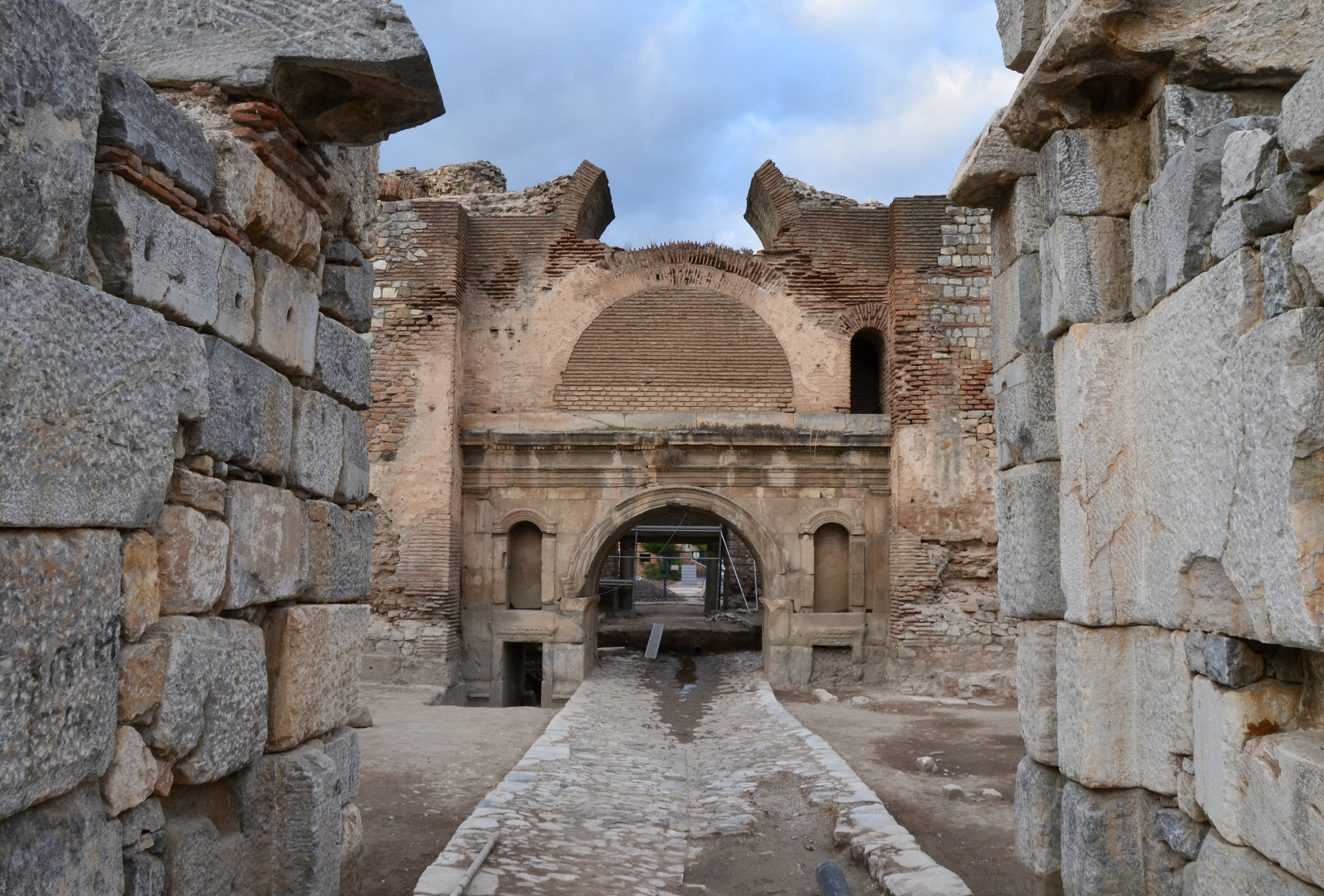
The Constantinople Gate

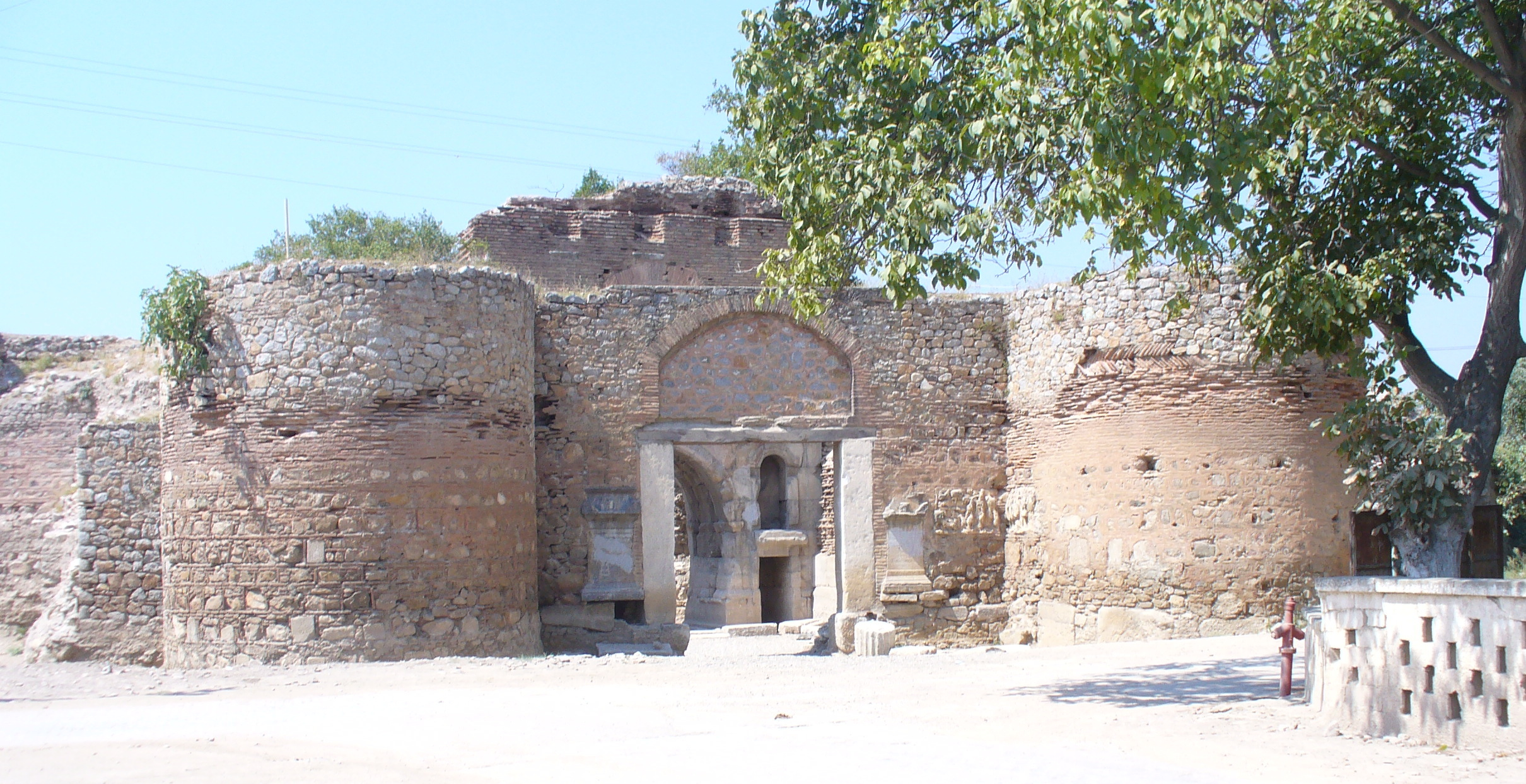
The Lefke Gate, part of Nicaea's city walls

The place is said to have been colonized by Bottiaeans, and to have originally borne the name of Ancore (Ἀγκόρη) or Helicore (Ἑλικόρη), or by soldiers of Alexander the Great's army who hailed from Nicaea in Locris, near Thermopylae. The later version, however, was not widespread, even in Antiquity. Whatever the truth, the first Greek colony on the site was probably destroyed by the Mysians, and it fell to Antigonus I Monophthalmus, one of Alexander's successors (Diadochi) to refound the city c. 315 BC as Antigoneia (Ἀντιγονεία) after himself. Antigonus is also known to have established Bottiaean soldiers in the vicinity, lending credence to the tradition about the city's founding by Bottiaeans. Following Antigonus' defeat and death at the Battle of Ipsus in 301 BC, the city was captured by Lysimachus, who renamed it Nicaea (Νίκαια, also transliterated as Nikaia or Nicæa; see also List of traditional Greek place names), in tribute to his wife Nicaea, who had recently died.

Sometime before 280 BC, the city came under the control of the local dynasty of the kings of Bithynia. This marks the beginning of its rise to prominence as a seat of the royal court, as well as of its rivalry with Nicomedia. The two cities' dispute over which one was the pre-eminent city (signified by the appellation metropolis) of Bithynia continued for centuries, and the 38th oration of Dio Chrysostom was expressly composed to settle the dispute.

Plutarch mentioned that Menecrates (Μενεκράτης) wrote about the history of the city. In some late-antiquity mythological accounts, Nicaea supposedly took its name from Nicaea, a nymph whom the god Dionysus got drunk and raped; he later named the city after her.

=== Roman period ===
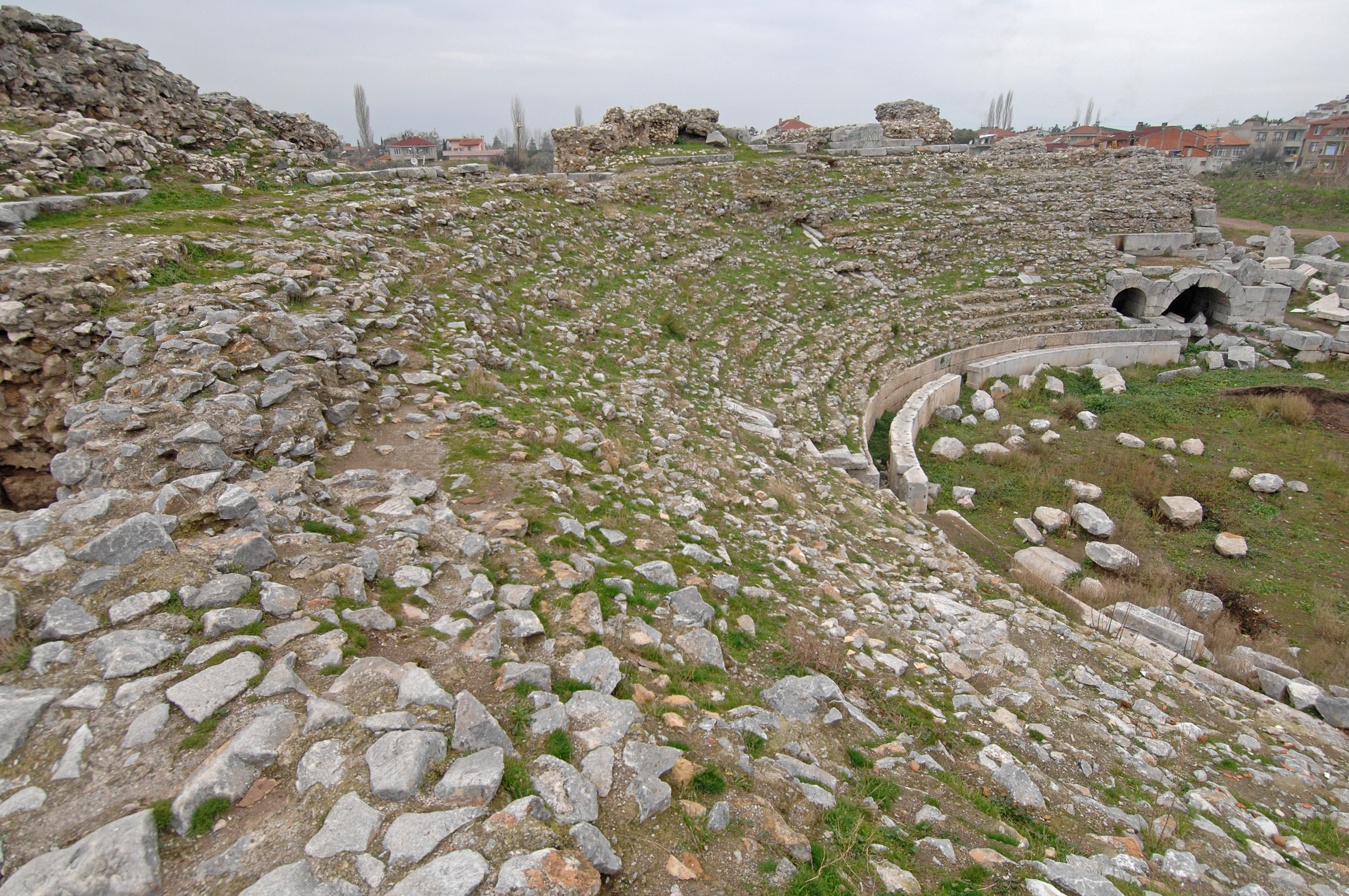
The theatre, restored by Pliny the Younger

Along with the rest of Bithynia, Nicaea came under the rule of the Roman Republic in 72 BC. The city remained one of the most important urban centres of Asia Minor throughout the Roman period, and continued its old competition with Nicomedia over pre-eminence and the location of the seat of the Roman governor of Bithynia et Pontus. The geographer Strabo (XII.565 ff.) described the city as built in the typical Hellenistic fashion with great regularity, in the form of a square, measuring 16 stadia in circumference, i.e. approx. 700 m × 700 m (2,297 ft × 2,297 ft) or 0.7 km × 0.7 km (0.43 mi × 0.43 mi) covering an area of some 50 ha (124 acres) or 0.5 km^{2} (0.2 sq mi); it had four gates, and all its streets intersected one another at right angles in accordance with the Hippodamian plan, so that from a monument in the centre all the four gates could be seen. This monument stood in the gymnasium, which was destroyed by fire but was restored with increased magnificence by Pliny the Younger, when he was governor there in the early 2nd century AD. In his writings Pliny makes frequent mention of Nicaea and its public buildings.

Emperor Hadrian visited the city in 123 AD after it had been severely damaged by an earthquake and began to rebuild it. The new city was enclosed by a polygonal wall of some 5 kilometres in length. Reconstruction was not completed until the 3rd century, and the new set of walls failed to save Nicaea from being sacked by the Goths in 258 AD. The numerous coins of Nicaea which still exist attest the interest taken in the city by the Roman emperors, as well as its attachment to the rulers; many of them commemorate great festivals celebrated there in honor of gods and emperors, as Olympia, Isthmia, Dionysia, Pythia, Commodia, Severia, Philadelphia, etc.

=== Christian Councils ===
Christianity became a legal religion of the Roman Empire in the reign of Constantine I (also known as Constantine the Great) by the Edict of Milan in 313. Constantine patronized Christianity and supported it by granting privileges, and became the first Roman emperor to adopt Christianity, but he did not get baptised until just before he died in Nicomedia. Constantine laid the groundwork for the majority of the population to become Christians, predominantly, the empire's formal religion in 380.

The Nicene Creed, (Ancient Greek: Σύμβολον τῆς Νικαίας, romanized: Sýmbolon tês Nikaías; Latin: Symbolum Nicaenum; lit. 'Symbol of Nicaea') which declared Jesus to be of the same essence as (consubstantial to) God the Father, and became the foundation of church doctrine, was adopted at the first Roman Ecumenical Christian council in this city in 325.

After shifting the council for four centuries, the Ecumenical Council was held in Nicaea again in 787. This council was called by the emperor of the Eastern Empire, Constantine VI, Empress Irene, who later became the first female emperor, and attended by Pope Hadrian I. It addressed the iconoclastic controversy and recognized the veneration of Christian images of Jesus and the saints as legitimate. The council also forbade the secular appointment of bishops, thus solidifying the independent authority of the church against that of the state.

=== Byzantine period ===
By the 4th century, Nicaea was a large and prosperous city, and a major military and administrative centre. Emperor Constantine the Great convened the First Ecumenical Council there, and the city gave its name to the Nicene Creed. The city remained important in the 4th century, seeing the proclamation of Emperor Valens (364) and the failed rebellion of Procopius (365). During the same period, the See of Nicaea became independent of Nicomedia and was raised to the status of a metropolitan bishopric. However, the city was hit by two major earthquakes in 363 and 368, and coupled with competition from the newly established capital of the Eastern Empire, Constantinople, it began to decline thereafter. Many of its grand civic buildings began to fall into ruin, and had to be restored in the 6th century by Emperor Justinian I, among them the aqueduct built by Hadrian.

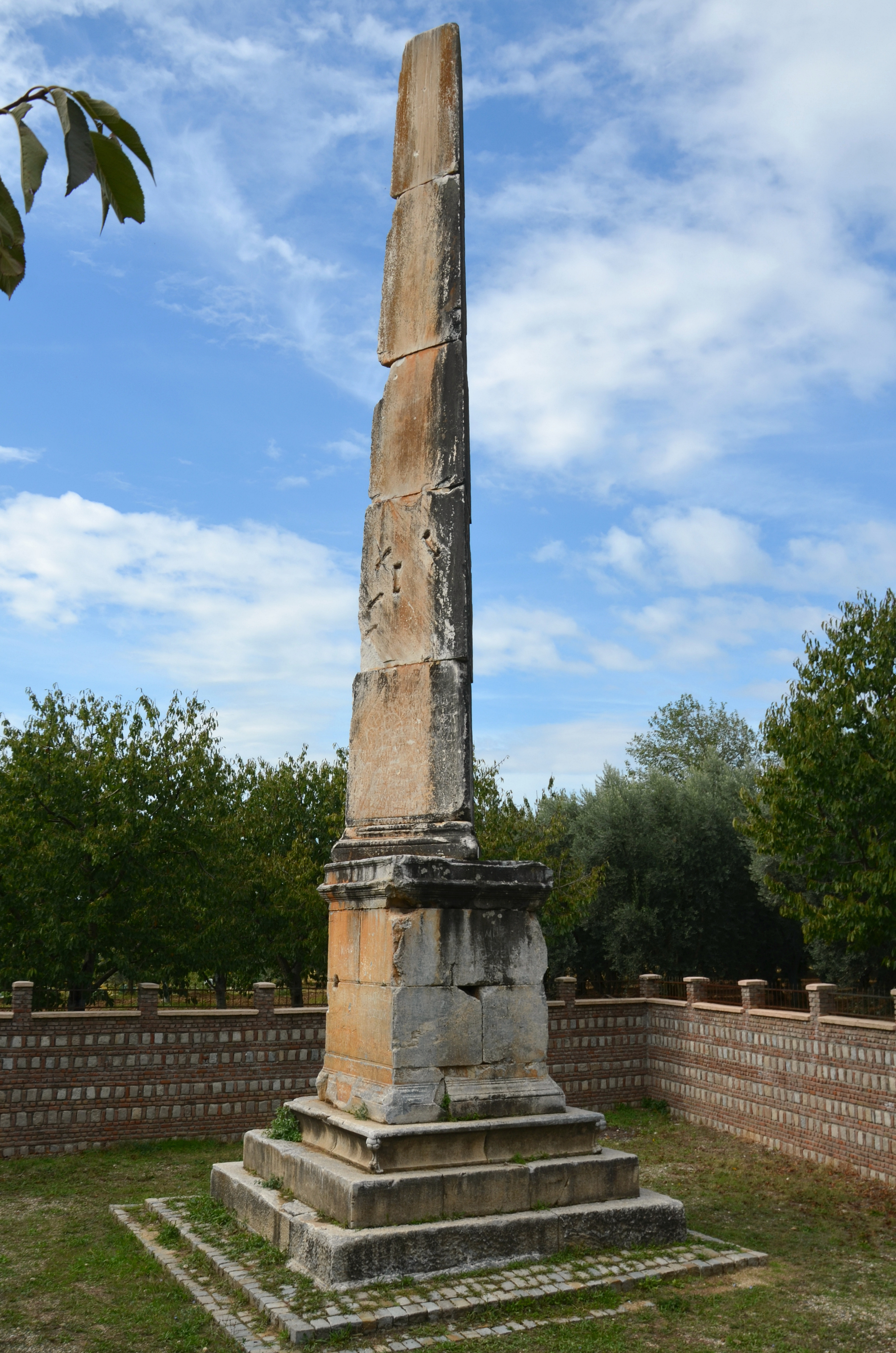
The Beştaş Obelisk, an obelisk-like funeral monument of Gaius Cassius Philieus located outside Nicaea, 1st century AD, Iznik, Turkey .

The city disappears from sources thereafter and is mentioned again in the early 8th century: in 715, the deposed emperor Anastasios II fled there, and the city successfully resisted attacks by the Umayyad Caliphate in 716 and 727. The city was again damaged by the 740 Constantinople earthquake, served as the base of the rebellion of Artabasdos in 741/2, and served as the meeting-place of the Second Ecumenical Council, which condemned Byzantine Iconoclasm, in 787 (the council probably met in the basilica of Hagia Sophia).

Nicaea became the capital of the Opsician Theme in the 8th century and remained a center of administration and trade. A Jewish community is attested in the city in the 10th century. Due to its proximity to Constantinople, the city was contested in the rebellions of the 10th and 11th centuries as a base from which to threaten the capital. It was in the wake of such a rebellion, that of Nikephoros Melissenos, that it fell into the hands of Melissenos' Turkish allies in 1081. The Seljuk Turks made Nicaea the capital of their possessions in Asia Minor until 1097, when it returned to Byzantine control with the aid of the First Crusade after a one month siege.

The 12th century saw a period of relative stability and prosperity at Nicaea. The Komnenian emperors Alexios, John and Manuel campaigned extensively to strengthen the Byzantine presence in Asia Minor. Alexios seems to have repaired the aqueduct after the reconquest and major fortifications were constructed across the region, especially by John and Manuel, which helped to protect the city and its fertile hinterland. There were also several military bases and colonies in the area, for example the one at Rhyndakos in Bithynia, where the emperor John spent a year training his troops in preparation for campaigns in southern Asia Minor.

After the fall of Constantinople to the Fourth Crusade in 1204, and the establishment of the Latin Empire, Nicaea escaped Latin occupation and maintained an autonomous stance. From 1206 on, it became the base of Theodore Laskaris, who in 1208 was crowned emperor there and founded the Empire of Nicaea. The Patriarchate of Constantinople, exiled from Constantinople, also took up residence in the city until the recapture of Constantinople in 1261. Although Nicaea was soon abandoned as the primary residence of the Nicene emperors, who favoured Nymphaion and Magnesia on the Maeander, the period was a lively one in the city's history, with "frequent synods, embassies, and imperial weddings and funerals", while the influx of scholars from other parts of the Eastern Roman world made it a centre of learning as well.

After the restoration of the Byzantine Empire in 1261, the city once again declined in importance. The neglect of the Asian frontier by Michael VIII Palaiologos provoked a major uprising in 1262, and in 1265, panic broke out when rumours circulated of an imminent Mongol attack. Emperor Andronikos II Palaiologos visited the city in 1290 and took care to restore its defences, but Byzantium proved unable to halt the rise of the nascent Ottoman emirate in the region. After Emperor Andronikos III Palaiologos and John Kantakouzenos were defeated at Pelekanon on 11 June 1329, the Byzantine government could no longer defend Nicaea. Nicaea finally surrendered to the Ottomans after a long siege 2 March 1331. After the fall of Nicaea, the scholar Nikephoros Gregoras remarked that:

The barbarians settled on the shores of Bithynia without fear and imposed the heaviest taxes on the remaining small towns. They did not, for a short time, drive the people and towns to complete destruction, for they were able to pay them easily and quickly. However, they [Turks] did not cease to make frequent attacks and to enslave the majority of the poor ones both on sea and land.

=== Ottoman Empire ===
In 1331, Orhan captured the city from the Byzantines and for a short period the town became the capital of the expanding Ottoman emirate. Many of its public buildings were destroyed, and the materials were used by the Ottomans in erecting their mosques and other edifices. The large church of Hagia Sophia in the centre of the town was converted into a mosque and became known as the Orhan Mosque. A madrasa and baths were built nearby. In 1334 Orhan built a mosque and an imaret (soup kitchen) just outside the Yenişehir gate (Yenişehir Kapısı) on the south side of the town. With the fall of Constantinople in 1453, the town lost a great degree of its importance, but later became a major centre with the creation of a local faïence pottery industry in the 17th century. Thereafter, it slowly faded away as it lost population. In 1779, the Italian archaeologist Domenico Sestini wrote that it was nothing but an abandoned town with no life, no noise and no movement.

== Ruins ==
=== City walls ===
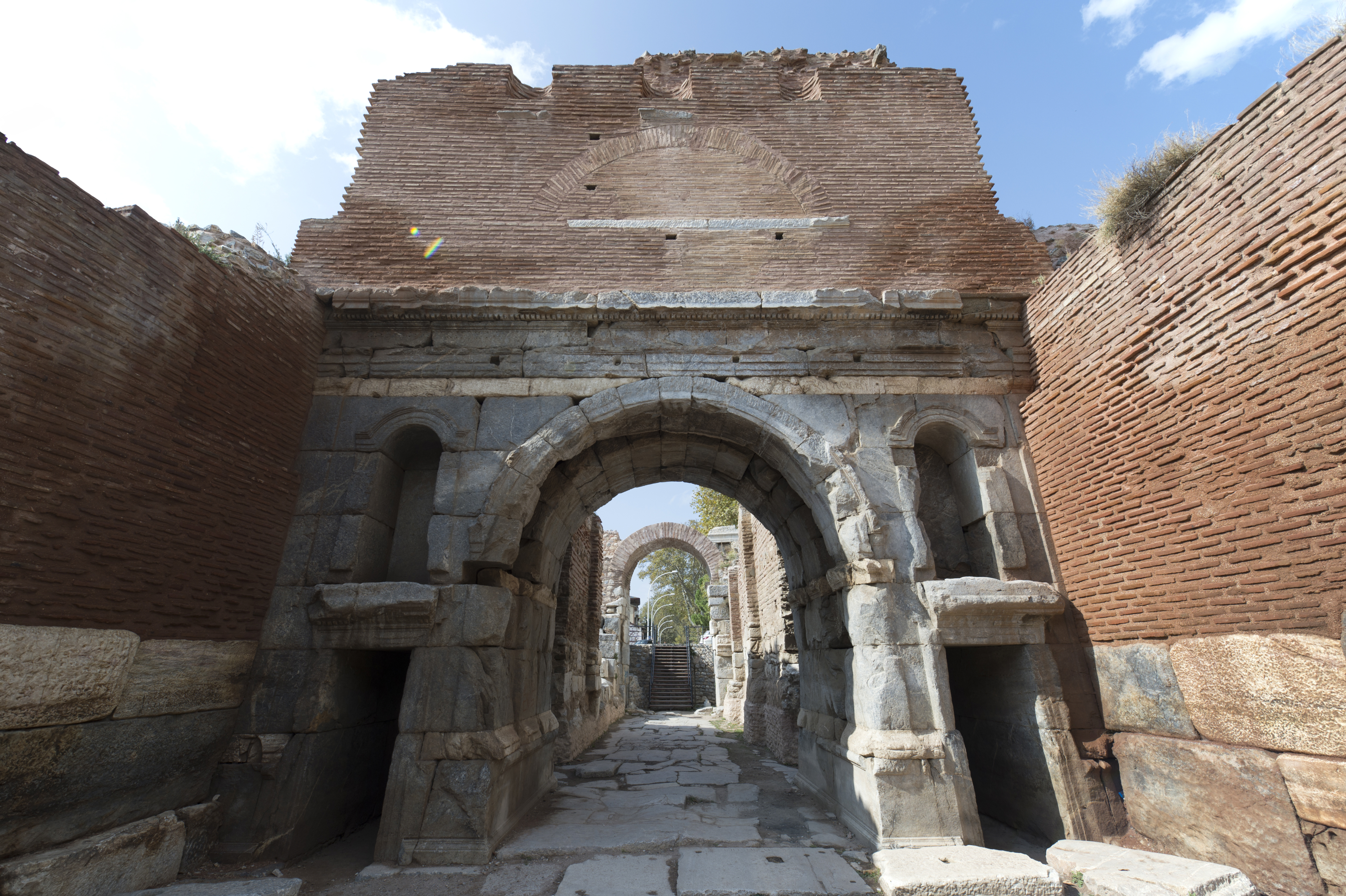
İznik Walls at the Lefke Gate

The ancient walls, with their towers and gates, are relatively well preserved. Their circumference is 3,100 m (10,171 ft), being at the base from 5 to 7 m (16 to 23 ft) in thickness, and from 10 to 13 m (33 to 43 ft) in height; they contain four large and two small gates. In most places they are formed of alternate courses of Roman tiles and large square stones, joined by a cement of great thickness. In some places columns and other architectural fragments from the ruins of more ancient edifices have been inserted. As with those of Constantinople, the walls seem to have been built in the 4th century. Some of the towers have Greek inscriptions.

=== Inner city structures ===
The ruins of mosques, baths, and houses, dispersed among the gardens and apartment buildings that now occupy a great part of the space within the Roman and Byzantine fortifications, show that the Ottoman-era town center, though now less considerable, was once a place of importance; but it never was as large as the Byzantine city. It seems to have been almost entirely constructed of the remains of the Byzantine-era Nicaea, the walls of the ruined mosques and baths being full of the fragments of ancient Greek, Roman, and Byzantine temples and churches.

In the northwestern parts of the town, two moles extend into the lake and form a harbour; but the lake in this part has much retreated, and left a marshy plain. Outside the walls are the remnants of an ancient aqueduct.

=== Church of the Dormition ===
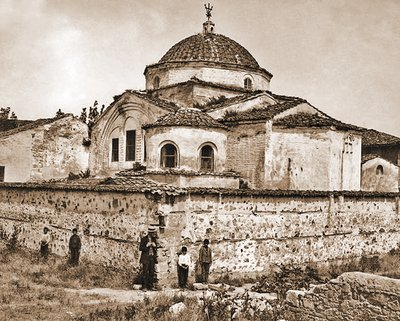
Church of the Dormition in Nicaea.

The Church of the Dormition, the principal Greek Orthodox church in Nicaea, was one of the most architecturally important Byzantine churches in Asia Minor. A domed church with a cross-shaped nave and elongated apse, and dating from the perhaps as early as the end of the 6th century, its bema was decorated with very fine mosaics that had been restored in the 9th century. The Church of the Dormition was destroyed by the Turks in 1922; only the lower portions of some of its walls survive today.

=== Ottoman kilns ===
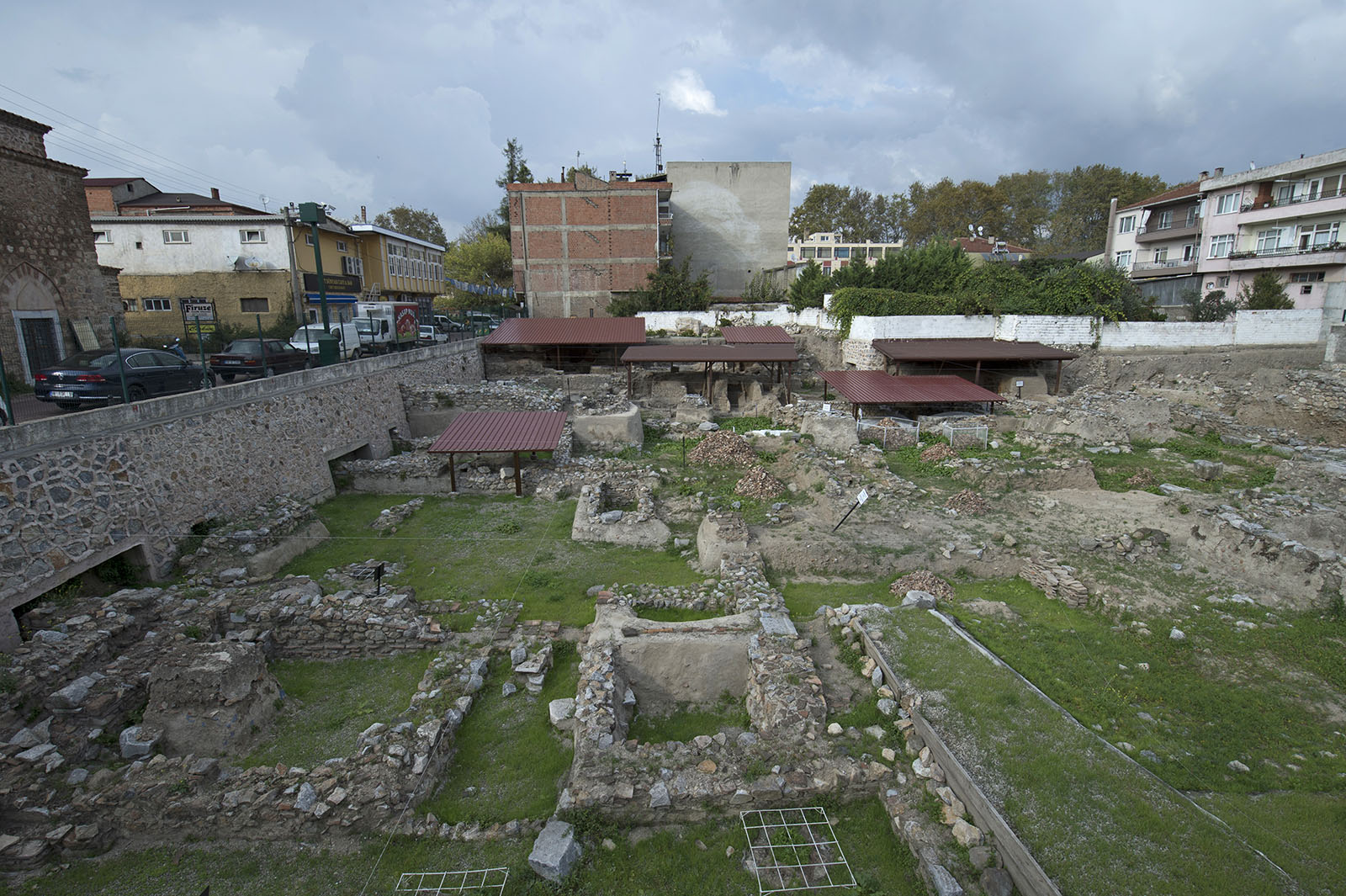
Iznik kilns excavations

Excavations are underway in the Ottoman kilns where the historic Nicean tiles were made.

=== Hagia Sophia church ===
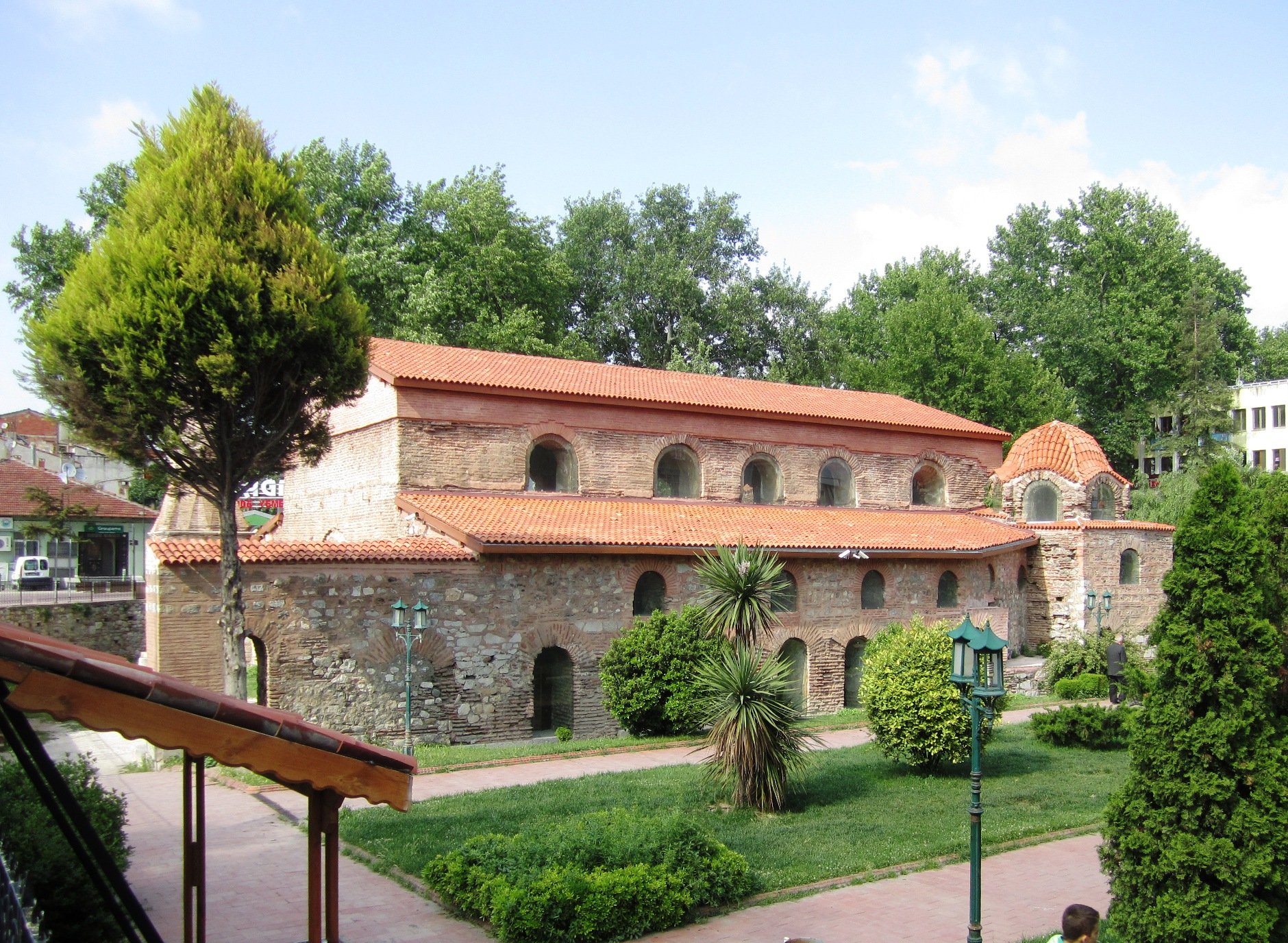
Hagia Sophia in 2012

The Hagia Sophia church of Nicaea is undergoing restoration.

=== Underwater basilica ===
Under the shallow waters on the margin of Lake İznik, at a site still located on firm ground on the lakeshore in Byzantine times, the ruins of the 4th-century Basilica of Saint Neophytos were found. Having since surfaced, the ruins might well be the site of the First Council of Nicaea.

=== Herakles relief ===
Eight kilometers from the city there is an ancient, human-size, Herakles relief engraved on a rock.

== See of Nicaea ==
The bishopric of Nicaea remains as a titular see of the Roman Catholic Church, which has left the seat vacant since the death of its last titular bishop in 1976. It is also a titular metropolitan see of the Ecumenical Patriarchate of Constantinople. The incumbent 2001–2010 was the former Archbishop of Karelia and All Finland, Metropolitan Johannes (Rinne).

== Notable people ==
- Hipparchus (c.190–c.120 BC), Greek astronomer, geographer, and mathematician.
- Apollonides (1st century AD), Greco-Roman writer
- Cassius Dio (AD c.150–c.235 AD), Greco-Roman historian.
- Sporus of Nicaea (c.240 – ca.300 AD), Greek mathematician and astronomer
- Neophytos of Nicaea (died c. 303 AD), Christian Saint and martyr
- Georgius Pachymeres (1242–c.1310 AD), Byzantine historian and philosopher.
- Eudoxia Laskarina (1245/48–1309/11), Byzantine princess
- Theoleptos of Philadelphia (c. 1250–1322 AD), Byzantine monk, theologian and Metropolitan of Philadelphia

== See also ==
- List of ancient Greek cities

== Sources ==
- Foss, Clive (1991). "Nicaea". In Kazhdan, Alexander (ed.). Oxford Dictionary of Byzantium. London and New York: Oxford University Press. pp. 1463–1464. ISBN 978-0-19-504652-6.
- Raby, Julian (1989). "İznik, 'Une village au milieu des jardins'". In Petsopoulos, Yanni (ed.). Iznik: The Pottery of Ottoman Turkey. London: Alexandra Press. pp. 19–22. ISBN 978-1-85669-054-6.
- Sestini, Domenico (1789). Voyage dans la Grèce asiatique, à la péninsule de Cyzique, à Brusse et à Nicée: avec des détails sur l'histoire naturelle de ces contrées (in French). London and Paris: Leroy.
- Stefanidou, Vera (2003). "Nicaea (Antiquity)". Encyclopaedia of the Hellenic World, Asia Minor. Foundation of the Hellenic World.
