= Lake İznik =

Lake near İznik, Turkey

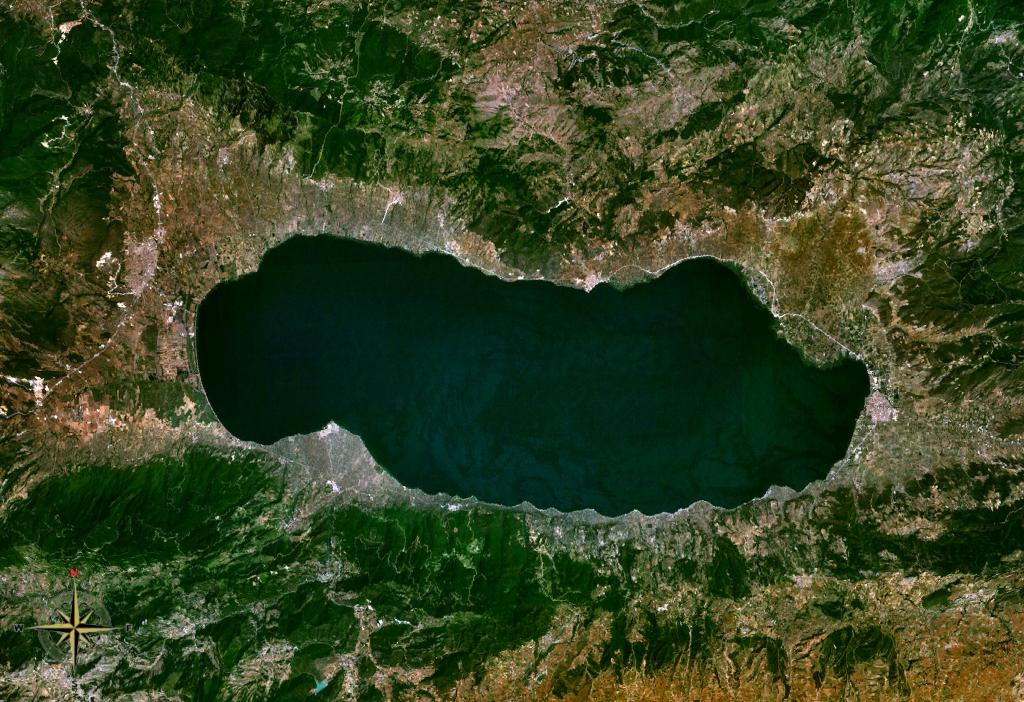
- View from space

- Location within Turkey
- Location: Bursa Province
- Coordinates: 40.43°N 29.52°E
- Basin countries: Turkey
- Max. length: 32 km (20 miles)
- Max. width: 10 km (6.2 miles)
- Surface area: 298 km^{2} (115 sq mi)
- Max. depth: 80 m (260 ft)
- Surface elevation: 85 m (279 ft)

Lake İznik (Turkish: İznik Gölü) is a freshwater lake in the Province of Bursa, Turkey. It is around 32 km (20 mi) in length and 10 km (6 1/5 mi) in width with a maximum depth of about 80 m (260 ft; 44 fathoms). The town of Iznik (historically known as Nicaea) lies at its eastern end. The lake's Ancient Greek name was Askania (Ἀσκανία); the Latin name was Ascania.

== History ==
In Greek mythology, during the Trojan War the region by Lake İznik was held by the Phrygians, who sent troops to the aid of King Priam, led by the brothers Phorcys and Ascanius, sons of Aretaon as related in the Iliad.

Ascanius, son of Aretaon, should not be confused with Ascanius (son of Aeneas) or Ascanius (son of Priam), who also feature in legends of the Trojan War.

In the 1920s, the region was known for rice production.

In 2014, during aerial photography to survey the local monuments, the remains of an Byzantine basilica erected in the 4th century were found underwater, named one of the top 10 discoveries by the Archaeological Institute of America. The basilica was dedicated to St. Neophytos of Nicaea and it was built sometime after 390 AD and destroyed in a major earthquake in 1065. Plans are underway to establish an underwater museum.

== Salinity ==
Lake Iznik has a salinity of 0.05 to 0.10 %, not enough to be tasted by humans. It cannot therefore be classified as a saltwater lake, but may be described as freshwater, brackish or subsaline.

== Important Bird Area ==
The lake, which is in unprotected status, was declared by BirdLife International as an Important Bird Area in 1989 for its waterfowl species, which are threatened through pollution and development of İznik as a recreational center.

The İznik town and lake

== Gallery ==
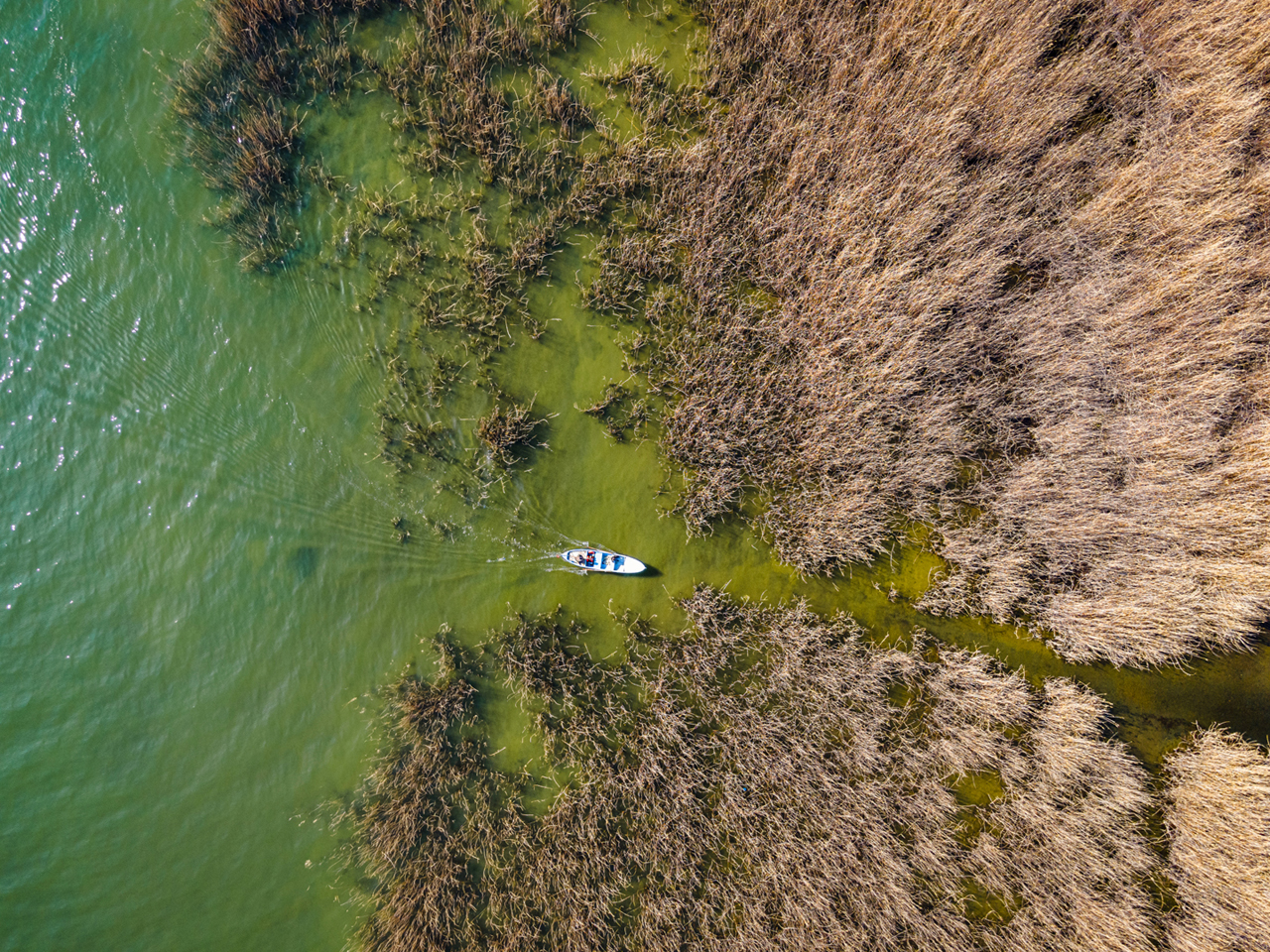
Lake İznik

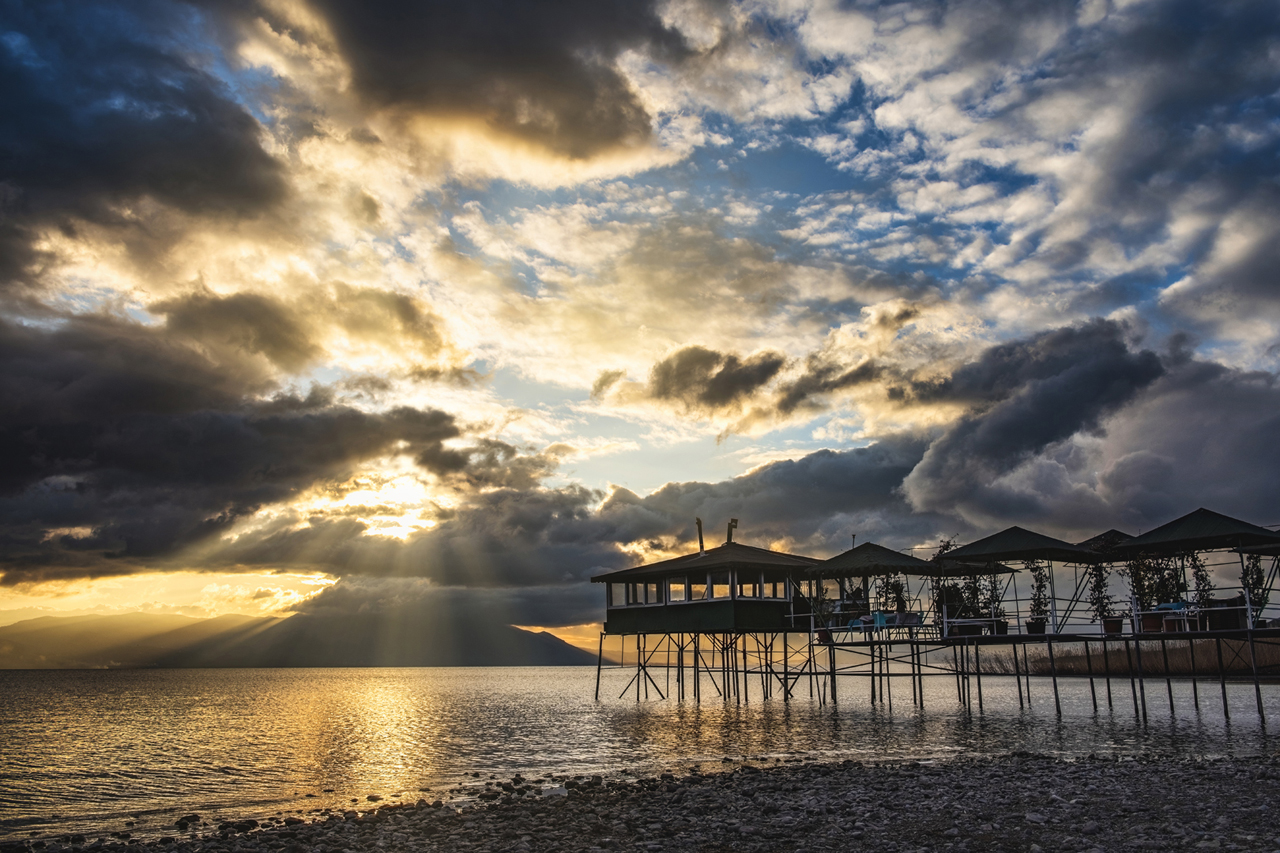
Lake İznik

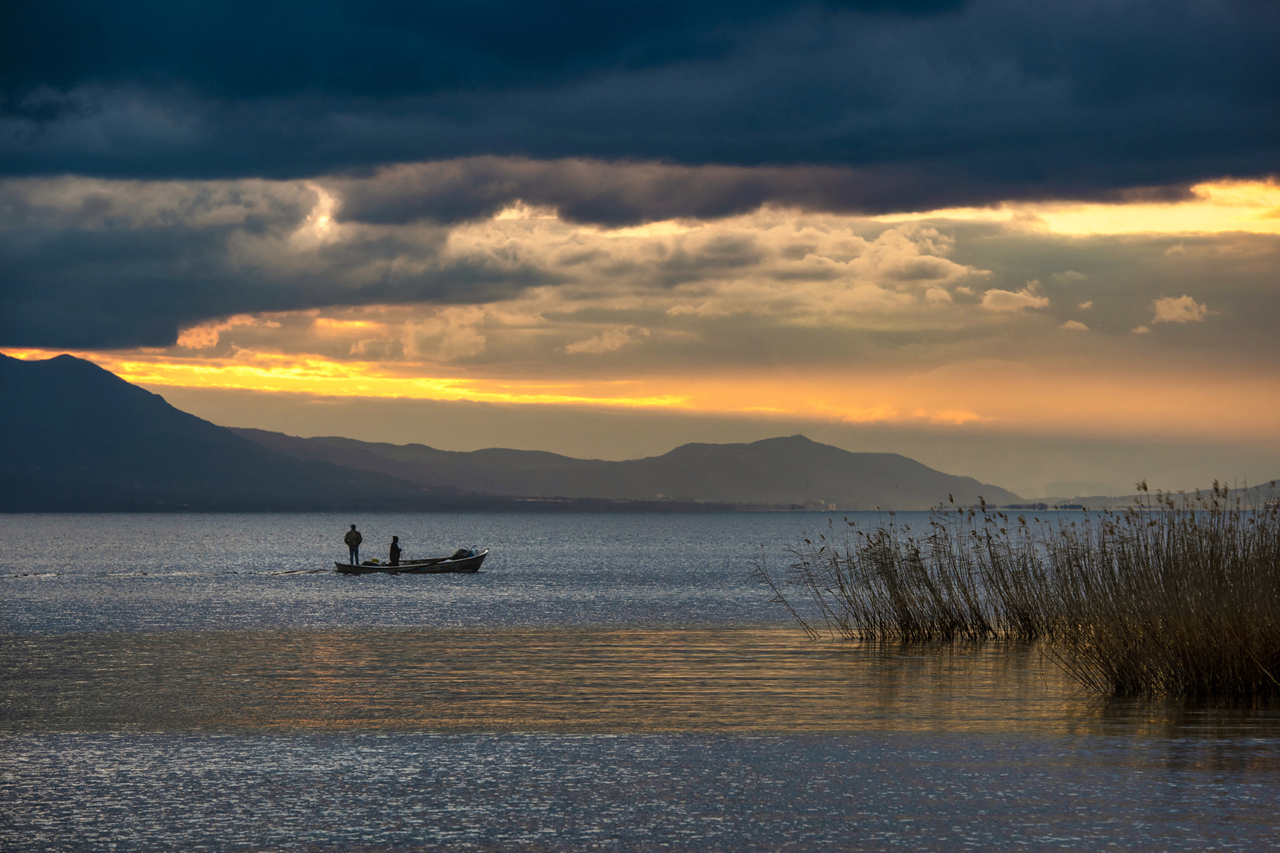
Lake İznik
