= Phorcys (disambiguation) =

Phorcys is a primordial sea god in Greek mythology.

Phorcys may also refer to:

- Phorcys (Trojan War), a hero of the Trojan War
- Phorcys (moon), a moon of 65489 Ceto
- Phorcys dubei, an extinct genus and species of therapsid
- Phorcys, a genus and species (Phorcys corylina) of fungus
