= Ascanius (disambiguation) =

Ascanius may refer to:

- In Classical mythology:
  - Ascanius, son of Aeneas
  - Ascanius, son of Priam
  - Ascanius, son of Aretaon
- Ascanius, a genus of bugs in the subfamily Pachycorinae
- Lake Ascanius in Anatolia
- Peter Ascanius (1723–1803), Norwegian biologist
- Domenicus van Wijnen, called Ascanius (1661–c.1695), Dutch painter
- HMAT Ascanius, Australian troopship
