= Rebellion of Artabasdos =

- Part of the Byzantine Civil Wars
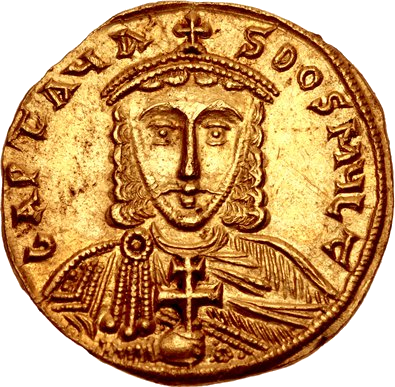
- Solidus of Artabasdos
Date	741–743 (Note: It is often speculated that the start date of the event is usually cited to 742, however this has been disproven.)
Location	Asia Minor • Thrace
Result	Victory for Constantine V

Belligerents
Forces of Artabasdos	Forces of Constantine V

Commanders and leaders
Artabasdos; Nikephoros; Niketas (POW); Baktangios (executed); Theophanes Monotes †	Constantine V Sisinnios; Beser †

Strength
c. 25,000–35,000	c. 15,000–20,000

The Rebellion of Artabasdos was a major rebellion against the recently ascended Byzantine emperor Constantine V by the military governor Artabasdos. The rebellion was initially successful, with Artabasdos briefly seizing the Byzantine throne by capitalizing on the widespread anger over Leo III and Constantine V's iconoclastic policies. However, after a sixteen-month conflict, Constantine eventually recaptured Constantinople, where he had Artabasdos and his sons publicly humiliated and blinded, thus suppressing the rebellion.

== Catalyst ==
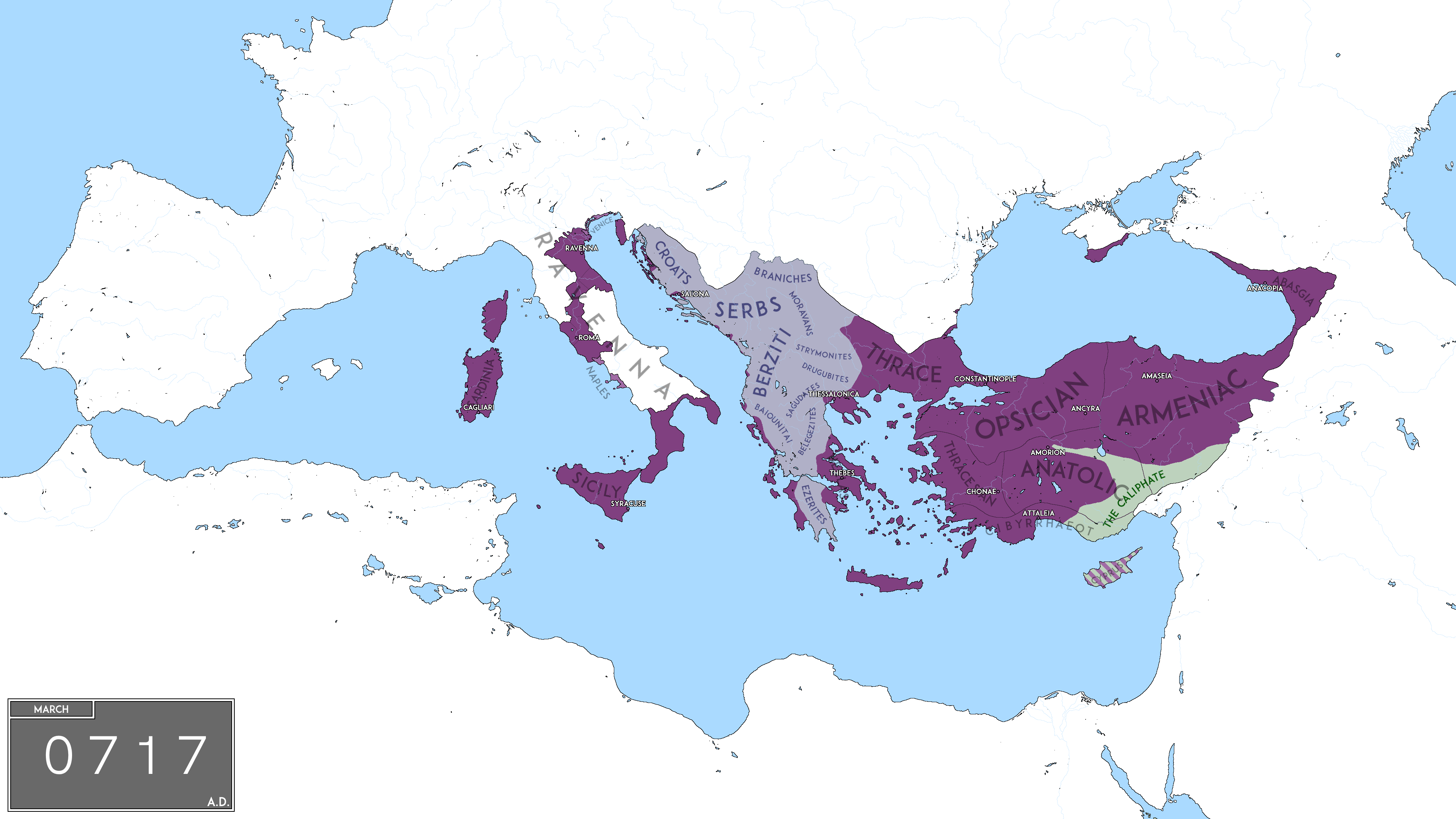
Byzantine Empire under the Isaurian dynasty c. 717.

Following the overthrow of Theodosius III, the new Byzantine Emperor Leo iii the Isaurian would reward Artabasdos of the title of kouropalates and command of the critical Opsikion Theme In return for his pivotal support. Leo would also marry his daughter (Anna) to Artabasdos, however in 741, Leo would pass away where his son Constantine V succeeded him, as Leo’s right-hand man and closest ally for decades, many in the empire viewed Artabasdos as a much more capable and legitimate successor than his younger brother-in-law, Constantine V, who was likely viewed unproven in battle, and highly controversial due to his father's strict religious policies. Artabasdos already commanded the massive Opsikion and Armeniac themes, giving him the immediate military advantage to take the throne for himself.

== Rebellion ==
As Constantine was intending to lunch a coordinated-campaign against the Arabs by arranging a meet up with Artabasdos, Artabasdos would instead launch his rebellion by orchestrating a pivotal ambush at Krasos against Constantine's forces near Dorylaeum where he was defeated, the strategos, Beser was slain during the attack. Constantine withdrew and sought refuge in Amorion where he was greeted and welcomed by the local garrison soldiers previously being commanded by his father.

Artabasdos later moved on Constantinople and gained the support of both Constantine's regent Theophanes Monutes and the Patriarch Anastasius entering the city unopposed and being acclaimed and crowned as emperor, while there, he immediately brought back religious icons where the Church, the public, and the Pope in Rome celebrate him as a religious savior, officially declaring the anti-icon policies of Leo III and Constantine V to be a heretical mistake, his high-ranking political co-conspirators also deliberately gave false rumor throughout the capital that Constantine had perished in battle against Arab forces. it is also probably around this time that Artabasdos proclaimed his son Nikephoros as co-emperor. While solidifying his position in Constantinople, Constantine was still alive and actively gathering loyalist troops from the respective Anatolic and Thracesian themes.

The following year, Artabasdos marched his main force out of Constantinople and crossed the Bosporus into Lydia where he was intercepted and routed near Sardis where he was then forced to retreat and was pursued all the way to Cyzicus however he managed to escape across the Bosporus sea and seek refuge behind the walls of Constantinople, Artabasdos had previously sent an Army under the command of his son Niketas to secure the rest of Asia Minor and rally support of the Armeniac Theme in guarantee of his family's hold on the throne, Niketas upon learning of his father’s defeat, rushed to his defense where he was met near Modrina by Constantine and suffered a crushing defeat. As the infighting dragged on, the defenseless vulnerability of the eastern frontier caught the attention of the Arab commander Sulayman ibn Hisham where his forces penetrated deep into Asia Minor reaching as far as Paphlagonia unopposed where he captured many prisoners. Instead of retreating to his home base after Modrina, he quickly regrouped his scattered, defeated troops.

Niketas launched a rapid pursuit on Constantine’s main army, trailing them all the way to Chrysopolis however he was outmaneuvered and dealt another defeat as he attempted to break through Constantine's line to reach the Bosporus, but suffered heavy losses and was militarily repelled, Constantine then relentlessly hunted down the remaining rebel contingents forcing a final decisive clash near the coast Nicomedia, the battle ended in an decisive victory for Constantine, confining Artabasdos' position to Constantinople, Constantine then initiated a siege by cutting off the supply lines Inside the city, conditions within the city rapidly deteriorated, leading to a severe famine and the deaths of the civilian population in desperation, Artabasdos appealed to the Umayyads to intervene against Constantine by sending secret emissaries which the Arabs declined as they were also dealing with internal instability of their own, with no military options remaining and the city's food stores entirely depleted, Artabasdos was forced to open the gates to allow the starving civilian population to flee the city to save themselves from starvation.

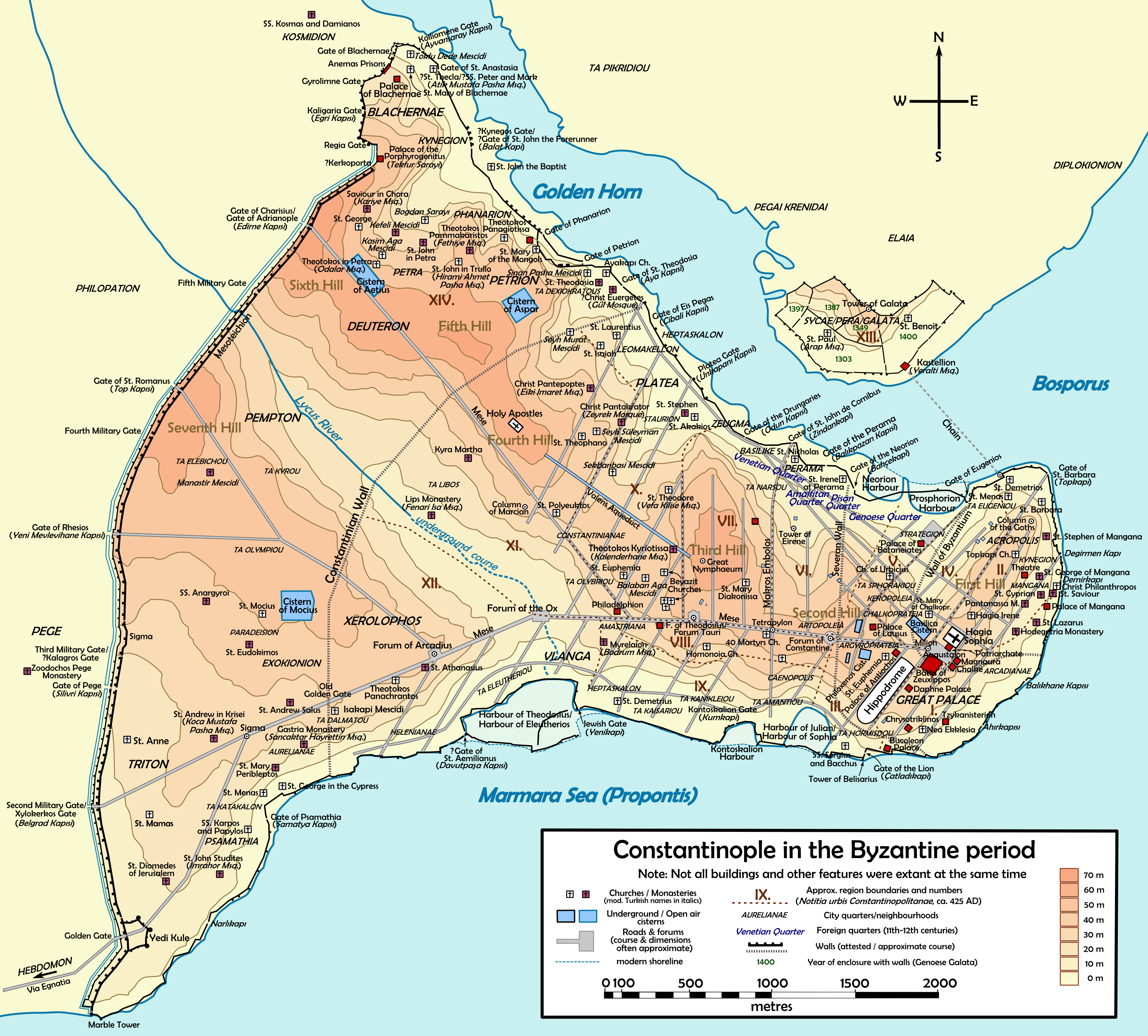
Constantinople during the Byzantine period

== Aftermath ==
As Constantine’s forces were able to storm and recapture the capital, Artabasdos slipped out of the city via the port with his close associate Banktangios where they sailed across the Marmara Sea to Asia Minor and headed for the heavily fortified city of Nicaea, realizing Nicaea would quickly be targeted, Artabasdos moved deeper into the Opsikion theme where he sought refuge at the mountain fortress of Pouzanes. Imperial agents eventually tracked them down where they were captured at the fortress and brought back to Constantinople in chains, Constantine immediately staged a massive victory triumph in the Hippodrome where Artabasdos and his sons were publicly mocked, blinded, and permanently exiled, while Banktangios was beheaded in the Kynegion. Anastasios, who had switched sides to crown Artabasdos, was punished by Constantine who had him blinded, stripped naked, strapped backwards onto a donkey, and paraded through the Hippodrome while the crowd mocked him. Oddly, because Constantine needed a submissive church leader, he reinstated Anastasios as patriarch immediately after this public shaming. To prevent future civil wars, Constantine also created the tagmata, a professional and permanent standing army units stationed right outside the capital.

== Bibliography ==
- Bonner, M. D. (2004). Arab-Byzantine Relations in Early Islamic Times. Ashgate/Variorum, Farnham. ISBN 978-0860787167
- Brubaker, L. and Haldon, J. (2011). Byzantium in the Iconoclast Era, C. 680–850: A History. Cambridge University Press. ISBN 978-0521430937
- Bury, J. B. (1923). The Cambridge Medieval History, Vol. 4: The Eastern Roman Empire. Cambridge University Press. ISBN 978-1456581633
- Nikephoros (1990). Short history. Translated by Cyril Mango. Dumbarton Oaks. ISBN 0-88402-184-X.
- Ostrogorsky, G. (1980). History of the Byzantine State. Oxford: Basil Blackwell. ISBN 978-0631127826
- Theophanes the Confessor (1997). The Chronicle of Theophanes Confessor. Translated by Cyril Mango; Roger Scott. Oxford University Press. ISBN 0-19-822568-7.
- Treadgold, W. T. (1995). Byzantium and Its Army. Stanford University Press: Stanford, California. ISBN 0804731632
- Treadgold, Warren (1997). A History of the Byzantine State and Society. Stanford, California: Stanford University Press. ISBN 0-8047-2630-2.
- Živković, Vojislav (2020). Улога ослепљења у политичком животу средњовековне Србије [The role of blinding in the political life of Medieval Serbia] (PDF). Пешчаник - часопис Нишког архива (in Serbian). 19.
