= Neophytos of Nicaea =

Christian martyr (died 303)

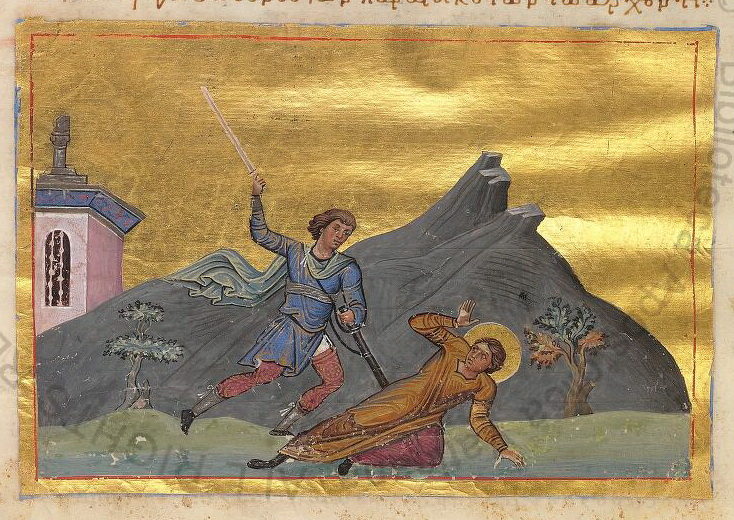

Neophytos was born in Nicaea of Bithynia to Christian parents who were named Theodore and Florentia. During the Diocletianic Persecution, he went to Nicaea and boldly denounced the pagan faith. He was killed by Roman soldiers in A.D. 303, 10 years before the Edict of Milan permanently established religious toleration for Christianity within the Roman Empire. His feast day is commemorated on January 21.

In 2014 the underwater Byzantine Basilica of Saint Neophytos suspected to have been dedicated in his honour was discovered in Lake İznik, modern-day Turkey. The basilica had been built in the place where he was killed on the shore of the lake and subsequently became submerged after an earthquake.
