= Vakhtang =

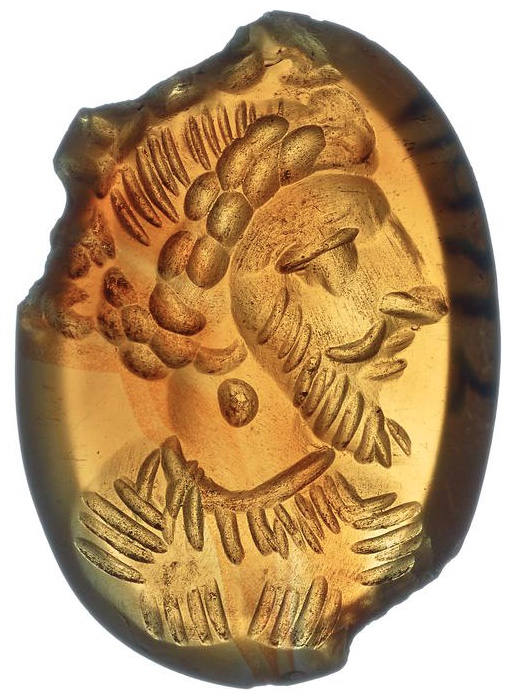
4th-century Sasanian stamp-seal of a certain Vakhtang. The Middle Persian (Pahlavi) inscription reads Wl[t]'nky

Vakhtang (Georgian: ვახტანგ) is a masculine Georgian given name of Persian origin. Originally from "vahrka-tanū," meaning "wolf-bodied." Some sources argue that the meaning of the name could possibly be a reference to a wolf cult, widely practiced in ancient Georgia.

Shorter version of the name Vakho (Georgian: ვახო) is an etymologically related variant of "Vakhtang," also commonly used in modern Georgian language.

== Notable people ==
=== Royalty ===
- Vakhtang I, Georgian king
- Vakhtang II, Georgian king
- Vakhtang III, Georgian king
- Vakhtang IV, Georgian king
- Vakhtang V, Georgian king
- Vakhtang VI, Georgian king
- Vakhtang, son of David IV of Georgia, Georgian prince
- Vakhtang, Duke of Aragvi, also known as "Vakhtang the Good"

=== Arts ===
- Vakhtang Kikabidze, Georgian actor
- Vakhtang Orbeliani, Georgian poet
- Vakhtang Chabukiani, Georgian ballet dancer
- Vakhtang Machavariani, Georgian conductor and composer
- Vakhtang Mchedelov, Russian director
- Vakhtang Murvanidze, Georgian figure skater
- Vakhtang Jordania, Georgian conductor
- Vakhtang Kakhidze, Georgian composer and conductor

=== Sports ===
- Vakhtang Blagidze, Georgian wrestler
- Vakhtang Chanturishvili, Georgian footballer
- Vakhtang Iagorashvili, Georgian-Soviet pentathlete
- Vakhtang Pantskhava, Georgian footballer
- Vakhtang Khvadagiani, Georgian footballer
- Vakhtang Koridze, Georgian footballer

=== Other ===
- Vakhtang Kolbaia, Abkhaz politician
- Baktangios, Byzantine dignitary
- Vakhtang Kapanadze, Georgian brigadier general
- Vakhtang "Loti" Kobalia, Georgian colonel
- Vakhtang Lejava, Georgian politician and academic
