= Baktangios =

Byzantine patrician

Baktangios (Greek: Βακτάγγιος; died 743) was a Byzantine patrikios and one of the principal supporters of the usurping emperor Artabasdos (r. 741/742–743).

Baktangios was probably of Georgian descent, his name being a Hellenized form of "Vakhtang". According to Christian Settipani, he may have been a scion of King Vakhtang I of Iberia.

Baktangios was closely associated with Artabasdos, a commander of Armenian origin, who seized Constantinople from Constantine V in 741. After Constantine made a comeback in November 743, Baktangios accompanied Artabasdos in his flight to the castle of Pouzanes in Opsikion (northwestern Asia Minor). They were both captured by Constantine's agents and brought to Constantinople, where Artabasdos was blinded and Baktangios was beheaded in the Kynegion, his head exposed on the Milion for three days. He was buried in the monastery of the Chora. Thirty years later, according to the chronicle of Theophanes, Constantine forced Baktangios's widow to unearth his remains, carry them away in her own cloak and deposit them in the cemetery of Pelagios, where suicides were buried.
