= Basilica of Saint Neophytos =

Coordinates: 40°25′32.8″N 29°42′35.1″E

- Interactive map of the Basilica of Saint Neophytos area

General information
- Location: Lake İznik, İznik, Bursa, Türkiye
- Year built: Late fourth–early fifth century C.E
- Demolished: 740

Design and construction
- Known for: Thought to be the venue of First Council of Nicaea.

Basilica of Saint Neophytos is the name of a defunct, underwater basilica in Lake İznik, modern-day Turkey. The ruins are visible just off shore.

== History ==
In 2014 the underwater Byzantine Basilica of Saint Neophytos, dedicated to Saint Neophytos, was discovered in Lake İznik, modern-day Turkey. The basilica had been built in the place where he was killed on the shore of the lake and subsequently became submerged after an earthquake in 740.

It is possible, according to researchers, that the basilica was built as a result of the First Council of Nicaea, convened by Emperor Constantine the Great in the year 325.

Its discovery was included in the list of top 10 archaeological discoveries of 2014 released by Archaeological Institute of America.

Due to receding water level the Basilica is no longer underwater. Now it is visible on land.
