= Phorcys (son of Phaenops) =

Greek mythical figure

In Greek mythology, Phorcys (/ˈfɔːrsɪs/; Ancient Greek: Φόρκυς, Phorkus) was a Phrygian ally of King Priam in the Trojan War. Phorcys appears in The Iliad as the leader of the Phrygians, a son of Phaenops. The Bibliotheca, however, refers to him as a son of Aretaon and brother of Ascanius, another Phrygian leader. Phorcys is mentioned among the Trojan allies whom Hector addresses with a speech in Book 17 of the Iliad. He was killed in battle by the Greek hero Ajax.

Phorcys is referenced in Pausanias' Description of Greece: the author explains that Phorcys was referred to as "shieldless" in the Iliad because he was wearing a two-piece corselet, which was thought to provide enough protection in the battle.
