= Aretaon =

In Greek mythology, the name Aretaon (Ancient Greek: Ἀρετάων Aretāōn) refers to the following figures associated with the Trojan War, who may or may not be one and the same character:

- Aretaon, father of the Phrygian leaders Ascanius and (possibly) Phorcys.
- Aretaon, a defender of Troy who was killed by Teucer.
