= Iconolatry =

Worship of icons

Iconolatry (Greek: εἰκών, eikon, 'picture or image', + λατρεία, latreia, 'veritable (full) worship or adoration') designates the idolatric worship or the adoration of icons. In the history of Christianity, iconolatry was mainly manifested in popular worship, as freedom of worship while others viewed it as superstitious belief in the divine nature of icons or deities. It was practiced as a focal point on icons, and other deities representing various saints, angels and God. One of the extreme practices of iconolatry was scraping parts of icons into the Holy Communion.

Iconolatry is the opposite of iconoclasm, and it also should not be confused with iconophilia, designating the moderate veneration of icons. Both extreme positions, iconolatry and iconoclasm, were rejected in 787 by the Second Council of Nicaea, being the seventh Ecumenical Council. The Council decided that holy icons should not be destroyed, as was advocated and practiced by the Byzantine iconoclasm, nor veritable (full) worshiped or adored (Greek: ἀληθινήν λατρείαν; Latin: veram latriam), as was practiced by iconolatry, but to be only venerated as symbolic representations of God, angels, or saints.

== Overview ==
Icon in Greek simply denotes a picture but it has now come to be closely associated with religious art which is used by the Eastern Orthodox and Catholic Churches. Icons are used to assist in prayer and the worship of God by Orthodox Churches. Icon (image) is the same word used in the Bible in Genesis 1:27, Colossians 1:15.

The Eastern Orthodox Church (which finally reinstated the icons) held at least two Church councils in order to make a decision about the proper use of icons. The Council of Hieria in 754 expressly forbade the making of icons, and ordered all pictures of Jesus and the saints to be removed from the churches, saying that they ought instead to be decorated with pictures of birds, flowers, and fruit. This council was held near Constantinople, and all attending bishops were from the Constantinople Patriarchate. The other patriarchs refused to send any delegates.

The Second Council of Nicaea held in 787 reversed the decisions of that council. This Council of Church leaders (bishops) was a key step towards an alternate understanding of the use of religious art in the Church. An early Church council defined veneration of icons based on the sacred mystery of the incarnation of Jesus Christ. The Person of Jesus was thought to reveal not only the Word of God (1 John 1:1–4), but the image of God (1 John 4:9). Pre-Christian scriptures defined idolatry as worshipping of false gods. Church leaders defended images of Christ on the basis that they were representations of the true incarnation of God and clarified the relationship between an image and the one depicted by the image. The principle of respected worship is that, in honoring an image, the honor is to paid not to the image itself, but the one who is portrayed. After the period of Iconoclasm was over, respected veneration of icons spread to Serbia, Bulgaria, and to distant Russia.

Depictions of icons which bear the image of God the Father and the Holy Spirit were forbidden in the Orthodox Church, unless they were depicted in the context of the Revelation or the Apocalypse of Saint John, where God the Father is described as an older version of Jesus. Some prefer the depiction of God in the icon type of Rublev's Holy Trinity. Others believe that, because no-one has ever seen God the Father, he should never be depicted in icons, while Jesus, who was seen by human eyes, is allowed to be pictured.

== See also ==
- Religious images in Christian theology
- Aniconism in Christianity
- Iconodulism
- Veneration
- Latria
