= Icon of the Triumph of Orthodoxy =

Christian icon

- Icon of the Sunday of Orthodoxy
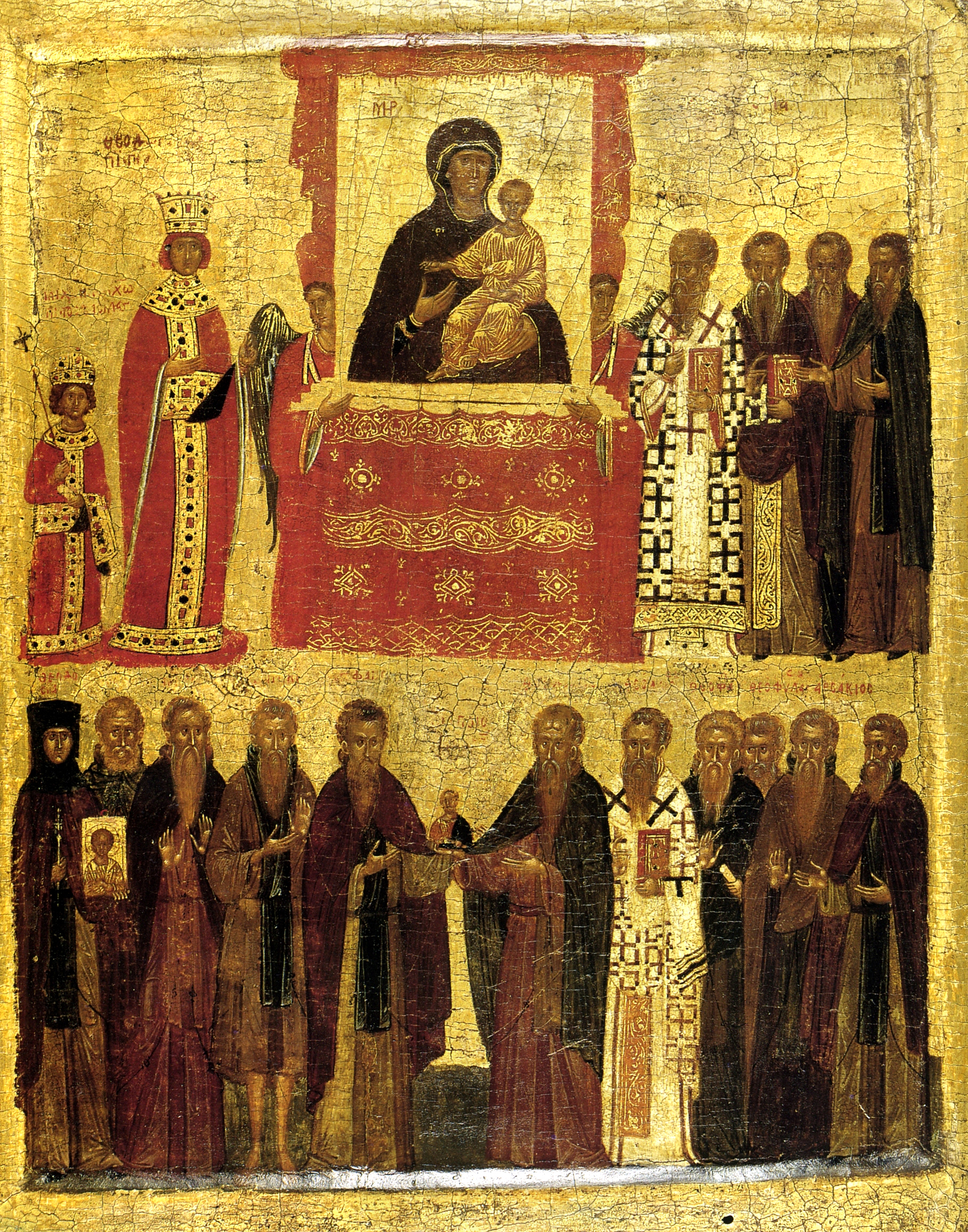
- Year: 1400
- Medium: Egg tempera with gold leaf on wooden panel, covered with gesso and linen
- Dimensions: 37.8 cm × 31.4 cm (14.9 in × 12.4 in)
- Location: The British Museum

The Icon of the Triumph of Orthodoxy (also known as the Icon of the Sunday of Orthodoxy) is a divine celebratory icon created around 1400 to commemorate the first feast of the Triumph of Orthodoxy on the first Sunday of Great Lent. The icon references the overcoming of the Byzantine Empire’s Eastern Orthodox faith from the dominance of the Islamic faith and the Byzantine Iconoclasm in 842. Shown in the icon's composition are important figures such as the Virgin Hodegetria, her child Jesus, and eleven saints and martyrs associated with the Triumph of Orthodoxy. Other elements and saints depicted in the icon’s composition are representative of iconodule ideology and the turmoil endured. It is painted with mediums such as gold leaf and egg wash that are of divine spiritual significance.

== History ==
During the seventh century, the Constantinople’s Orthodox faith saw iconoclasms due to Islam’s dominance in the region and their practice of aniconism. Influenced by Islam's aniconism, iconoclasm of icons and violence against iconodules in the Orthodox faith had become more common. In 842, icon veneration became an acceptable practice again in the Orthodox church with the endorsement of Empress Theodora and the death of iconoclast Emperor Theophilos.Under the later coming threat of Islamic conquest, the Triumph of Orthodoxy on the first Sunday of Great Lent was created to be a reminder of perseverance that led to the end of the Byzantine Iconoclasm. The celebration was created to reassure the people that Muslim conquest would not happen and that the Byzantine Empire would prevail.

The icon was created around the year 1400 to depict the first celebration of the Triumph of Orthodoxy after the founding of the triumph’s celebration in 1370. The usage of the icon was important to the celebration that occurs on the first Sunday of Lent as its main role is to celebrate the end of the iconoclasm in 843. It also served the role of quelling the Byzantine people’s insecurity about the downfall of the Byzantine Empire. The icon is thought to have been painted in Constantinople, capital of the Byzantine Empire. Currently, the icon itself does not play a major role in the celebration of the first Sunday of Great Lent.

The icon was purchased by the British Museum in 1988 and has since then been shown in multiple exhibitions that educate about Byzantine art and history. The icon continues to reside there in the present day in good condition with little or few alterations and defects.

== Composition ==
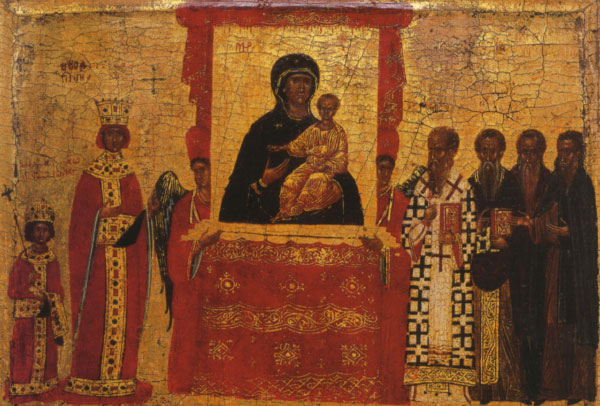
The upper half of the composition depicting figures surrounding the image of the Virgin Hodegetria with her child Christ. (National Icon Collection 18, British Museum)

Created in a style typical of Byzantine artwork, the composition of the icon uses elements of spirituality to overall represent a ceremonial feast between members of the Orthodox church.The composition can be seen to have two separate halves including figures placed in a formation that suggests a gathering for a celebration. The colors used are made up of bright and bold red, gold and brown colors. Other subtle colors such as white and blue are present in the clothing of the figures on the top right and bottom half of the composition. The artwork features high contrast between the space and the subjects through the use of the gold leaf on the wood panel.

The focal point is located on the top center right as a famous icon, here intended to be understood as the physical icon itself, the Virgin Hodegetria. The Hodegetria is a specific representation of the Virgin Mary holding the child Christ. The composition is representative of the original moment in life where the Virgin Hodegetria held the child Jesus. The image was a proliferant icon in the early Byzantine era due to its power in showing populations the way to the Christian faith. The Hodegetria is being held up by two angels while to the left stand Empress Theodora and her son Michael III, who were responsible for ending Iconoclasm in 843. To the right of the Hodegetria are Patriarch Methodios, Bishop Theodore and two monks. Patriarch Methodios is the depicted saint who founded the feast of the Triumph of Orthodoxy. Beneath them are eleven saints and martyrs. Just below the Hodegetria are Theophanes the Confessor and Theodore the Studite jointly holding an image of Christ. To the far left is Saint Theodosia, the only female saint, holding an icon of Christ-Emmanuel. She is depicted wearing a skepe, a veil with a squarish top, typical of Byzantine nuns. The fourth figure from the left, right behind Theophanes the Confessor, is identified as Joannicius the Great. On the right, behind Theodore the Studite, stands a bishop identified by his garb while right behind him stand the brothers Theodorus and Theophanes Graptoi. The last two figures are identified as Saint Theophylaktos and Arsakios. Though they are all depicted together, a number of them were not contemporaries nor relevant until much later after the end of the iconoclasm.

== Iconography ==
The feast depicted in the composition of the work represents members and saints of the Orthodox faith commemorating the Triumph of Orthodoxy. Many of the saints represented in the image are individuals who have fought against the iconoclasm and in turn have suffered, have been exiled or have been executed. Saint Theodosia is regarded as a martyr for defending the icon of the Savior at the Bronze Gates of Constantinople. After killing the soldier ordered to destroy the icon by shaking a ladder, Saint Theodosia was punished with execution. Theophanes the Confessor and Theodore the Studite were saints of whom were imprisoned and punished for condemning iconoclastic rule. Theophylact of Nicomedia similarly condemned iconoclastic rule; he prophesied the death of Emperor Leo V the Armenian, and was exiled to Fortress Strobil where he died. To challenge the focal iconoclastic opinion of the Byzantine Iconoclasm, those who venerated the Icon of the Triumph of Orthodoxy commonly believed that the icon was created by St. Luke, an Evangelist saint, to further the acceptance of image reverence. St. Luke is regarded as the one who first painted the Virgin Hodegetria with the child Christ in life. Many similar icons are created with St. Luke’s original composition to capture and reproduce the same moment in time for its spiritual power. Many of the iconodule saints are painted to hold icons of Christ to convey the message that to destroy an image of Christ is to destroy and insult Christ himself.

On the upper half of the icon where the Virgin Hodegetria and her son Jesus are located, the two angels holding up the stand provide the Virgin and her son a sense of divinity and holiness. The focal point is established through the use of a bold red border surrounding the image of the Virgin and her son, suggesting this is also an icon meant to revere the Virgin Hodegetria. A number of the saints in the composition hold icons; the use of the icons were not only central to the victory of the iconodules, but also the celebration of the first Sunday of Lent. The usage of gold leaf to illuminate the icon also plays a role in providing the figures to be backed on a space that is indiscernible, timeless and incorporeal from reality in its image and message.

== Medium ==
The medium and materials used to paint the icon were of ritualistic significance. The usage of gold leaf in Byzantine artwork is indicative that the work is meant to be divine and spiritual. The icon was created by incorporating egg tempera on gold leaf over a wooden panel. The wood panel then is covered with gesso and linen.

The icon has a height of 37.8 cm, a width of 31.4 cm and a depth of 5.3 cm.

Preceded by 66: Holy Thorn Reliquary	A History of the World in 100 Objects; Object 67	Succeeded by 68: Shiva and Parvati sculpture
