= Council of Constantinople =

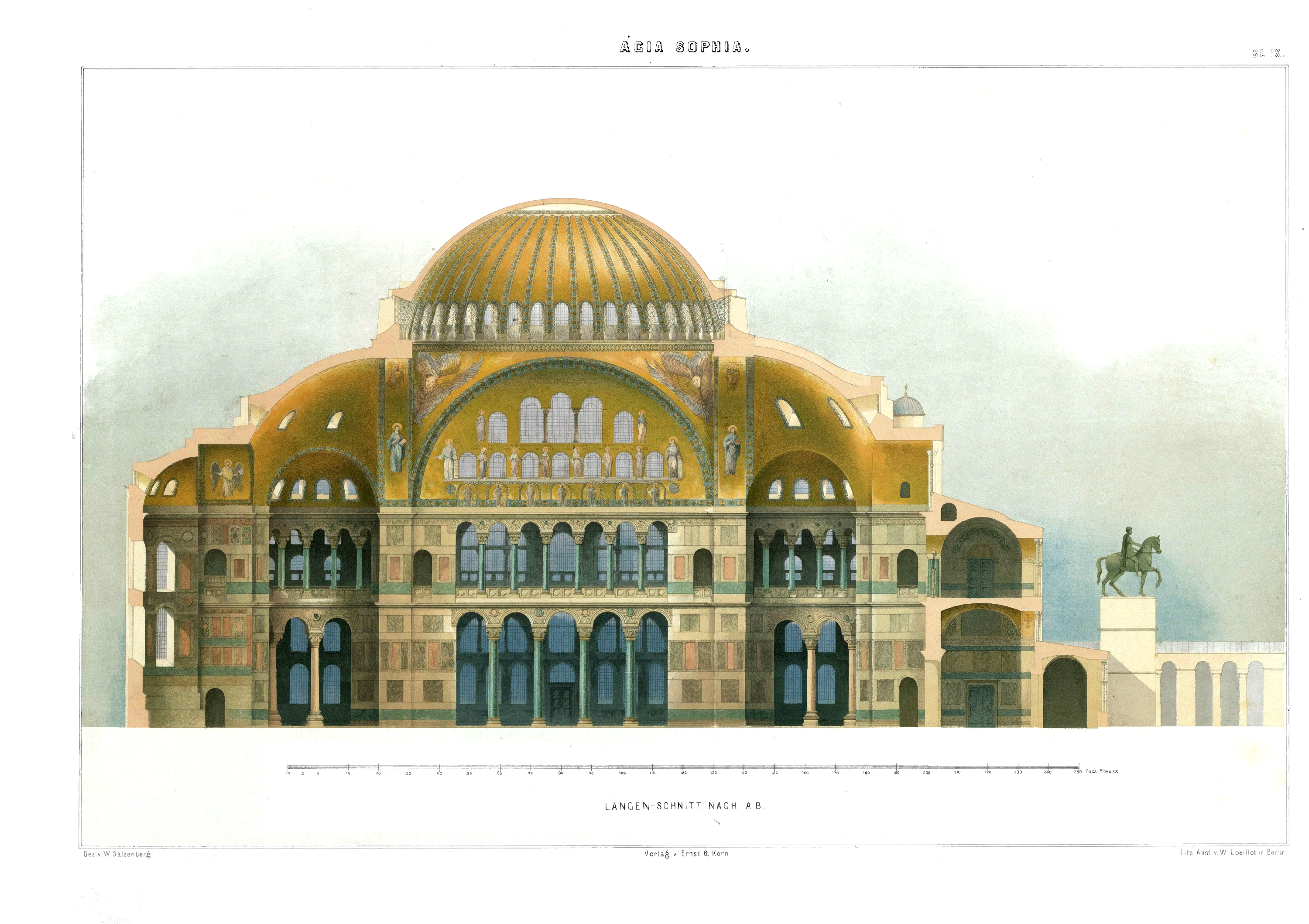
View of the Hagia Sophia as it would have appeared in Byzantine Constantinople

Council of Constantinople can refer to the following church councils (also known as synods) convened in Constantinople (modern day Istanbul, Turkey):

== Councils prior to the East–West Schism of 1054 ==
- Council of Constantinople (360), a local council
- First Council of Constantinople (381), the Second Ecumenical Council
- Council of Constantinople (382), a council convened by Theodosius I.
- Council of Constantinople (383), a local council, rejected teachings of Eunomius
- Council of Constantinople (394), a local council, produced several canons
- Council of Constantinople (518), affirmed the Council of Chalcedon (451)
- Council of Constantinople (536), deposed Anthimus I of Constantinople, condemned opponents of the Council of Chalcedon
- Synod of Constantinople (543), a local council which condemned Origen of Alexandria
- Second Council of Constantinople (553), the Fifth Ecumenical Council
- Third Council of Constantinople (680), the Sixth Ecumenical Council
- Council of Constantinople (692), also called the Quinisext Council or Council in Trullo
- Council of Constantinople (754), better known as the Council of Hieria
- Council of Constantinople (815), a local council that restored iconoclasm
- Council of Constantinople (843), a local council that restored the veneration of icons (the 'Triumph of Orthodoxy')
- Council of Constantinople (861), a local council that confirmed the deposition of Ignatios of Constantinople and election of Photios I of Constantinople

=== Councils of differing interpretation between the Roman Catholic and Eastern Orthodox churches ===
- Council of Constantinople (867), a local council convened by Photius to discuss Papal supremacy and the Filioque
- Fourth Council of Constantinople (Catholic Church) (869), considered the Eighth Ecumenical Council by the Catholic Church, deposed Photios I
- Fourth Council of Constantinople (Eastern Orthodox) (879), considered the Eighth Ecumenical Council by some Eastern Orthodox, also called the Photian Council as it reinstated Photios I

== Councils after the schism (only attended by Eastern Orthodox bishops) ==
- Council of Constantinople (1082), a local council convened to condemn John Italus
- Council of Constantinople (1094), also known as the Council of Blachernae (1094), a local council convened to condemn Leo of Chalcedon
- Council of Blachernae (1157), condemned Soterichos Panteugenos, Patriarch-elect of Antioch; rhetoricians Michael of Thessalonica and Nikephoros Basilakes; and the idea that Christ the Son offered Himself as a sacrifice solely to the Father
- Council of Constantinople (1285), also known as the Council of Blachernae (1285), a local council that rejected the Roman Catholic Second Council of Lyon
- Fifth Council of Constantinople (1341–1351), considered the Ninth Ecumenical Council by some Orthodox, resolved the Hesychast controversy
- Synod of Constantinople (1484), condemned the Roman Catholic Council of Florence
- Council of Constantinople (1583), decided not to accept the Gregorian calendar
- Council of Constantinople (1593), approved the creation of the Moscow Patriarchate
- Synod of Constantinople (1638), condemned Cyril Lucaris' Confession
- Council of Constantinople (1722), condemned all forms of Catholicisation
- Council of Constantinople (1756), affirmed the necessity of rebaptism for Roman Catholics converting to Orthodox Christianity
- Council of Constantinople (1848), issued the Encyclical of the Eastern Patriarchs, a reply to Pope Pius IX's In Suprema Petri Apostoli Sede epistle (also titled the Epistle to the Easterners)
- Council of Constantinople (1872), condemned phyletism as a non-Orthodox schismatic movement
- Council of Constantinople (1923), a major council, (although not ecumenical,) introduced several reforms, most controversially the revised Julian calendar reform
