= Ecumenical Council of Nicea =

Ecumenical Council of Nicea may also refer to:

- The First Council of Nicaea, AD 325
- The Second Council of Nicaea, AD 787
