= Photian Council =

The term Photian Council or Photian Synod may refer to:

- Council of Constantinople (859), confirmed election and consecration of Patriarch Photios
- Council of Constantinople (861), second confirmation of election and consecration of Patriarch Photios
- Council of Constantinople (867), third confirmation of election and consecration of Patriarch Photios
- Council of Constantinople (879-880), rehabilitation of Patriarch Photios

== See also ==
- Council of Constantinople (disambiguation)
- Photios I of Constantinople
