= Rubley =

Rubley is a surname. Notable people with the surname include:

- Carole A. Rubley (born 1939), American politician
- T. J. Rubley (born 1968), American football quarterback

== See also ==
- Rublev
