= Council of Hieria =

Iconoclastic Christian council held in 754

- Date: 754
- Accepted by: Byzantine iconoclasts; Preferred by some Protestants
- Previous council: Third Council of Constantinople (Roman Catholic numbering); Quinisext Council (Eastern Orthodox numbering)
- Convoked by: Constantine V
- President: Archbishop Theodosius of Ephesus
- Attendance: 338 bishops
- Topics: Iconoclasm
- Documents and statements: veneration of icons condemned

The Council of Hieria was a Christian council of 754 which viewed itself as ecumenical, but was later rejected by the Second Council of Nicaea (787) and by Roman Catholic and Eastern Orthodox churches, since none of the five major patriarchs participated. However, it is preferred over Second Nicaea by some Protestants. The council was significant in the controversy of Byzantine iconoclasm, condemning the veneration and production of religious icons as idolatrous and pagan, reflecting Byzantine Emperor Constantine V's iconoclasm. This council declared itself the 'Seventh Ecumenical Council', as did the Second Council of Nicaea.

== Background ==
Quotations in the writings of Patriarch Nikephoros I of Constantinople (c. 758–828) show that Constantine was a competent theologian. He waited until the episcopal see of Constantinople to become vacant, which occurred in January 754 with the death of Patriarch Anastasius of Constantinople, before convoking the council.

The council was convoked by Constantine in the palace of Hieria at Chalcedon, and was in session from February to March 754.

== Iconoclasm ==
Three hundred and thirty-eight bishops attended the council, endorsing Constantine V's iconoclast position. The bishops maintained that the worship of images became widespread after the Third Council of Constantinople of 680–681. They argued that pictorial representation of God is impossible, because an icon of Christ either depicts his humanity alone or confuses his humanity and divinity; which they rule to be Nestorianism and monophysitism respectively. They also considered the only true image of Christ to be the Eucharist. The bishops declared that "the unlawful art of painting living creatures blasphemed the fundamental doctrine of our salvation—namely, the Incarnation of Christ, and contradicted the six holy synods. [...] If anyone shall endeavour to represent the forms of the Saints in lifeless pictures with material colours which are of no value (for this notion is vain and introduced by the devil), and does not rather represent their virtues as living images in himself, etc. [...] let him be anathema". These Christological arguments represent a development from the arguments of earlier iconoclasts, who appealed to the biblical condemnation of the production of images in the Second Commandment.

Similar pronouncements on the issue of religious images had been made in the Synod of Elvira (c. 305) whose Canon 36 states: "Pictures are not to be placed in churches, so that they do not become objects of worship and adoration". If understood this way, it is the earliest such prohibition known.

The council represents a moderate party of iconoclasts which affirmed the intercession of saints and Mary, mother of Jesus, as evidenced by one of its anathemas against the one who "does not ask for [the prayers of Mary and the saints] as having the freedom to intercede on behalf of the world according to the tradition of the church". It is debated among scholars whether Constantine remained faithful to the moderate position or later shifted to the radical view in which the intercession of Mary and saints was denied on the grounds of 'soul-sleep'. This view is reported by later iconodule sources who may have exaggerated for polemical purposes, thus their reliability is questioned in modern scholarship.

== Reception ==
Opponents of the council described it as the Mock Synod of Constantinople or the Headless Council because no patriarchs or representatives of the five great patriarchates were present: the see of Constantinople was vacant; Antioch, Jerusalem and Alexandria were under Islamic dominion; while Rome was not asked to participate. Its rulings were anathematized at the Lateran Council of 769, before being overturned almost entirely by the Second Council of Nicaea in 787, which endorsed and upheld the orthodoxy of the veneration of holy images. After the later triumph of the iconodules, this council became known as a robber council, i.e. as uncanonical, because there were neither the patriarchs nor representatives of patriarchs present. Edward J. Martin describes the later judgment of the council.

On the ecumenical character of the Council there are graver doubts. Its president was Theodosius, archbishop of Ephesus, son of the Emperor Apsimar. He was supported by Sisinnius, bishop of Perga, also known as Pastillas, and by Basil of Antioch in Pisidia, styled Tricaccabus. Not a single Patriarch was present. The see of Constantinople was vacant. Whether the Pope and the Patriarchs of Alexandria, Antioch, and Jerusalem were invited or not is unknown. They were not present either in person or by deputy. The Council of Nicaea [II] considered this was a serious flaw in the legitimacy of the Council. 'It had not the co-operation of the Roman Pope of the period nor of his clergy, either by representative or by encyclical letter, as the law of Councils requires.' The Life of Stephen borrows this objection from the Acts and embroiders it to suit the spirit of the age of Theodore. It had not the approval of the Pope of Rome, although the modern day Catholic theologians assert that there is a canon that no ecclesiastical measures may be passed without the Pope.' The absence of the other Patriarchs is then noticed.

The council and its Christological arguments were later refuted as heretical by Nicaea II, and also by the Council of Constantinople (843) which reasserted the significance of icons in the Church. During the second period of Byzantine iconoclasm, Emperor Leo V the Armenian overtured Nicaea II and reinstated Hieria. However, rather than regarding icons as idolatrous, they were merely considered superfluous, and images that were suspended high up (which could not therefore be actively venerated) were not removed. However the definitive re-establishment of iconodulia was effected under Patriarch Methodios I of Constantinople, and by the 850s iconoclasm was defeated.

Some Protestants accept the council as legitimate.

== Sources ==
- Cormack, Robin (2009). "Art and Iconoclasm". In Jeffreys, Elizabeth; Haldon, John; Cormack, Robin (eds.). The Oxford Handbook of Byzantine Studies (Oxford Handbooks). Oxford University Press.
