= Methodios I of Constantinople =

Ecumenical Patriarch of Constantinople from 843 to 847

Saint Methodius I of Constantinople
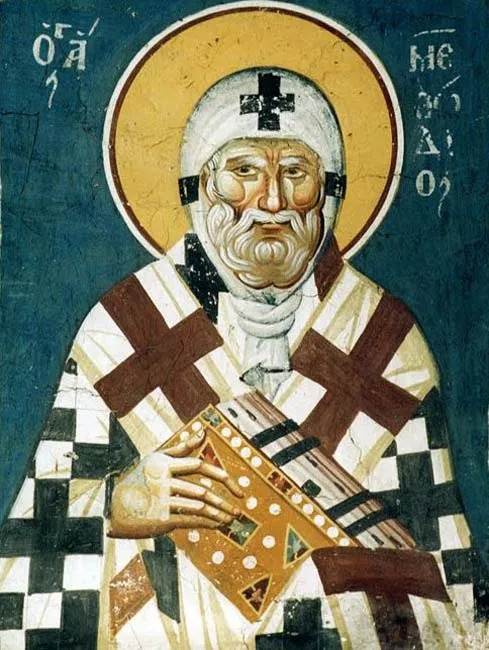
- Fresco from the Church of St. Mary Peribleptos, Ohrid

Ecumenical Patriarch of Constantinople
- Born: Methodius c. 788/800; Syracuse, Theme of Sicily
- Died: 14 June 847; Constantinople
- Venerated in: Eastern Orthodox Church; Catholic Church
- Feast: 14 June

Saint Methodius I of Constantinople
- Ecumenical patriarch of Constantinople
- Installed: 11 March 843
- Term ended: 14 June 847
- Predecessor: John VII of Constantinople
- Successor: Ignatius of Constantinople

Personal details
- Denomination: Chalcedonian Christianity

Methodius I of Constantinople or Methodios I (Greek: Μεθόδιος Α΄; c. 788/800 – 14 June 847) was the Ecumenical Patriarch of Constantinople from 11 March 843 until his death on 14 June 847. He is best known for restoring the veneration of icons in the Byzantine Church in 843, marking the end of the second period of Byzantine Iconoclasm. He is venerated as a saint in both the Eastern Orthodox Church and the Catholic Church, and his feast day is celebrated on 14 June.

== Life ==
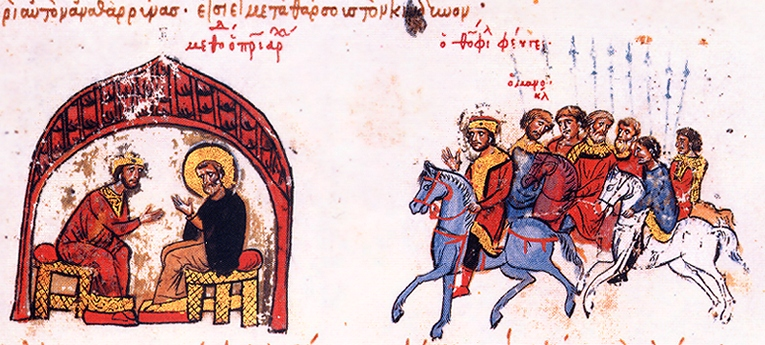
12th-century miniature from the Manasses Chronicle depicting Patriarch Methodius I discussing matters with the emperor Theophilos.

Born to wealthy parents, Methodius was sent as a young man to Constantinople to continue his education and hopefully attain an appointment at court. But instead, he entered a monastery in Bithynia, eventually becoming abbot.

Under Emperor Leo V the Armenian (813–820) the Iconoclast persecution broke out for the second time. In 815 Methodius went to Rome, perhaps as an envoy of the deposed Patriarch Nicephorus I of Constantinople. Upon his return in 821 he was arrested and exiled as an iconodule by the Iconoclast regime of Emperor Michael II. In 828 Michael II, not long before his death, mitigated the persecution and proclaimed a general amnesty. Methodius returned to Constantinople.

Michael II was succeeded by his son, Theophilos, who followed his father's policies. Methodius was again arrested and imprisoned. He escaped and was hidden by friends. Seeing that Methodius was not to be overcome by punishment, the emperor tried to convince him by argument. The result of their discussion was that Methodius to some extent persuaded the emperor. At any rate towards the end of the reign, the persecution was mitigated. Theophilos died in 842.

Soon after the death of the emperor, in 843, the influential minister Theoktistos convinced the Empress Mother Theodora, as regent for her two-year-old son Michael III, to permit the restoration of icons. He then deposed the iconoclast Patriarch John VII of Constantinople and secured the appointment of Methodius as his successor, bringing about the end of the iconoclast controversy.

A week after his appointment and after the Council of Constantinople (843), accompanied by Theodora, Michael III, and Theoktistos, Methodius I made a triumphal procession from the church of Blachernae to Hagia Sophia on 11 March 843, restoring the icons to the church. This heralded the restoration of Christian orthodoxy, and became a holiday in the Byzantine Church, celebrated every year on the First Sunday of Great Lent, and known as the "Triumph of Orthodoxy".

The final years of the saint passed peacefully, he toiled much, wisely guided the Church and his flock. Throughout his short patriarchate, Methodius I tried to pursue a moderate line of accommodation with members of the clergy who were formerly iconoclasts.

Methodius I was well-educated, engaged in both copying and writing of manuscripts. His individual works included polemica, hagiographical and liturgical works, sermons and poetry.

== See also ==
- Council of Constantinople (843)
- Theodora (wife of Theophilos)

== Bibliography ==
- The Oxford Dictionary of Byzantium. Oxford University Press. 1991.

Titles of Chalcedonian Christianity
| Preceded by John VII | Ecumenical Patriarch of Constantinople; 843 – 847 | Succeeded by Ignatius |
