= Council of Constantinople (843) =

Local Christian council in Constantinople

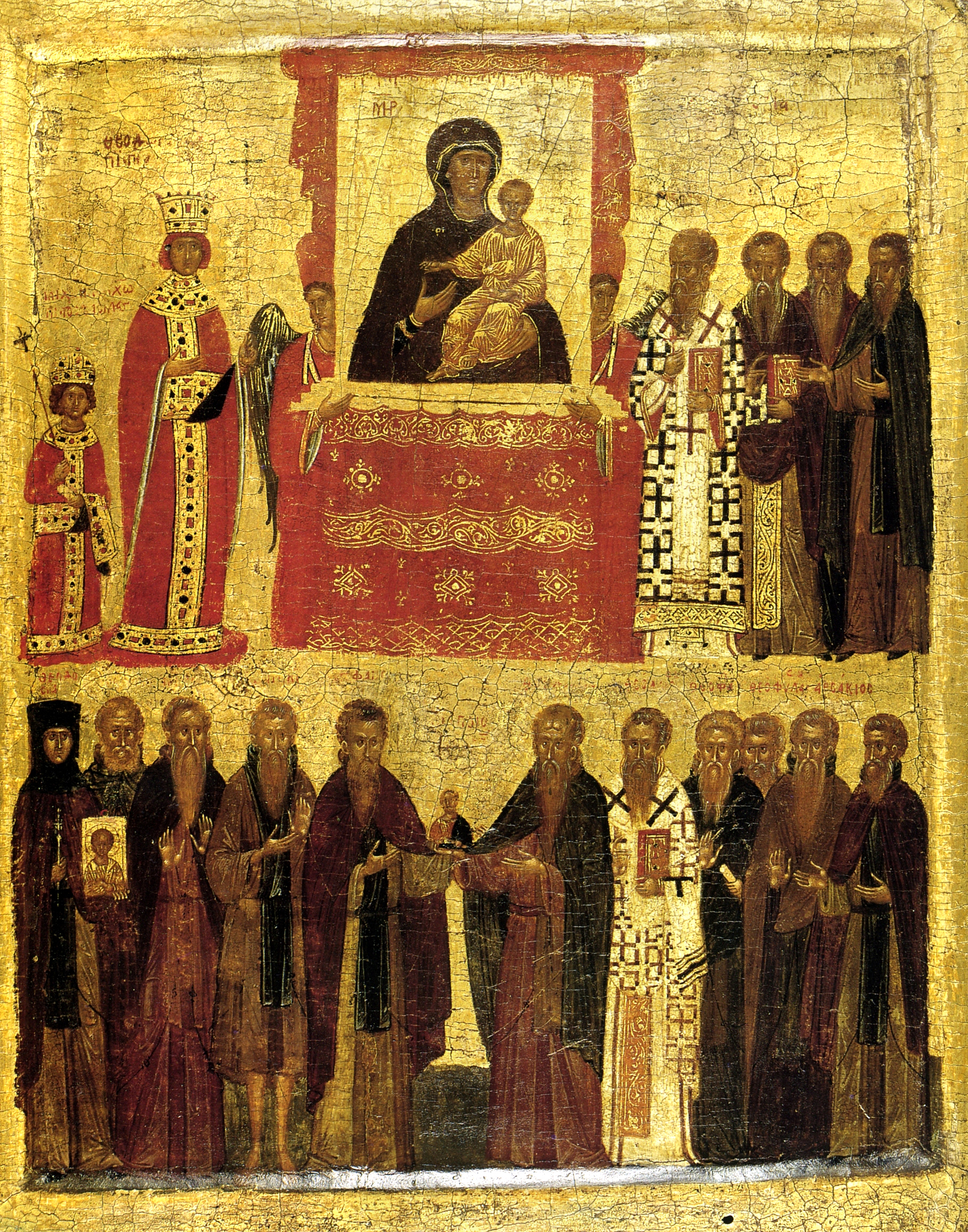
- Late 14th-early to 15th century icon illustrating the Triumph of Orthodoxy over iconoclasm in 843. (National Icon Collection 18, British Museum).
- Date: 3 or 4 March 843 (council), 11 March 843 (date of celebration)
- Accepted by: Eastern Orthodox Church; Byzantine Rite Catholic Churches
- Previous council: Council of Constantinople of 815
- Next council: Council of Constantinople (861)
- Convoked by: Theodora, mother of Emperor Michael III
- President: Patriarch Methodios I of Constantinople
- Attendance: The Holy Endemic Synod of Constantinople
- Topics: Dogmatization of the proper veneration of icons; Condemnation of iconoclasm and disposal of iconoclast clergymen
- Location: Constantinople, Byzantium (modern-day Turkey).

The Council of Constantinople of 843 or the Synod of Constantinople of 843 was a local council (as opposed to an ecumenical council) of Christian bishops that was convened in Constantinople (modern-day Istanbul, Turkey) in AD 843 by the Byzantine regent Theodora to confirm iconophilism in the Church. This council is still celebrated on the first Sunday of Great Lent in the Eastern Orthodox Church, as presecribed by the council. After the council which was under the presidency of the Patriarch Methodios I, the attendees met on 11 March 843 and symbolically processed from the Blachernae Church to the Church of Hagia Sophia bearing an icon of the Mother of God.

== Background ==
In AD 815, iconoclasm was officially reinstated in the Byzantine Empire by Leo the Armenian. This period is generally referred to as the Second Iconoclasm and lasted until of the Council of Constantinople in 843. In 829, Theophilos became the sole emperor and began an intensification of iconoclasm with an edict in 832 forbidding the veneration of icons. After the death of Theophilos in January of 842, the empire was inherited by the infant Michael III and managed by his mother Theodora until 856. The eunuch and Logothetes tou dromou Theoktistos was appointed as coregent with Theodora and was her aid during her regency. It is unclear whether or not Theophilos, being an iconoclast, had known that his wife Theodora was an iconophile.

Theoktistos (who as coregent became a driving force against iconoclasm according to the historians Theophanes Continuatus, Genesios, John Skylitzes, and Zonaras) advocated for the replacement of the iconoclast patriarch John the Grammarian with Methodios I who had earlier been imprisoned by Theophilos. Theodora consented, and Methodios was chosen to become the patriarch of Constantinople during the council on March 3 or 4, 843. After he was elevated (probably a week later on March 11), he immediately disposed of and replaced a great number of iconoclast bishops in the empire.

== Proceedings ==
On March 3 or 4 of AD 843, a council was convened by Theodora. Little is known about the details of the council, and the lengthiest extant description of it comes from the Vitae of Sts. David, Symeon and George. The actual location of the synod is a point of dispute. The Synodicon Vetus and many other authorities name the Kanikleiou Palace, the home of Theoktistos, but there is some indication that this was the location of a pre-council meeting, while the actual synod location was held at the Blachernae Church. Notable attendees of the council were Patriarch Methodios, Theodora, Theoktistos, Sergios Niketiates, and several iconoclast clergymen.

The objective of the council was principally to reaffirm the canonical decisions regarding the proper veneration of icons that the Second Council of Nicaea, the seventh ecumenical council, had already made in AD 787. To do this, the council condemned two iconoclast councils, Hieria (754) and Constantinople (815), and disposed of any bishops who did not respect the resolutions of the Nicea council. These bishops were replaced by iconophile bishops who had been exiled during the Second Iconoclasm. The Council of Hieria had also previously been condemned by the 787 Nicea council. As a condition for signing the resolution of the 843 council, Theodora required that the anathema that the Church had placed on her late husband be lifted.

=== Celebration ===
It is likely that the official elevation of Methodios and restoration of the veneration of icons took place a week after the council on Cheesefare Sunday in the Church of Hagia Sophia, which would be March 11, 843 (it was traditional to elevate a hierarch on a Sunday). Methodios himself wrote that there were monks from all over the empire present, including Mount Athos. Participants symbolically processed from the Blachernae Church to the Church of Hagia Sophia, bearing an icon of the Mother of God to adorn the barren cathedral. The Vitae of Sts. David, Symeon and George recounts, "At dawn, he took that great phalanx of people and they raised on high with their hands the all-holy icon of our Lord and of the Mother of God who bore Him [Christ] and openly carried it through the street in public procession." According to the Book of Ceremonies, the people chanted "Kyrie Eleison" during the procession.

=== Synodikon of Orthodoxy ===
In the Church of Hagia Sophia, the people recited the Synodikon of Orthodoxy, a short profession of the validity of icon veneration which was authored by Patriarch Methodios. This profession of faith is still recited today in the Eastern Orthodox Church on the first Sunday of Great Lent, called the Sunday of Orthodoxy. Beginning in the mid-eleventh century and then increasingly during the Komnenian era (1081–1185), the document received a series of additions. The Synodikon serves as a fundamental piece of the theology and doctrine of icons in the Eastern Orthodox Church.

== See also ==
- Feast of Orthodoxy
- Iconoclasm
- Theodora (wife of Theophilos)
- Methodios I of Constantinople
- Theoktistos
- Council of Constantinople
- Second Council of Nicaea

== Works cited ==
- Barber, Charles (2007). "The Synodikon of Orthodoxy and the Ground of Painting". Contesting the Logic of Painting: Art and Understanding in Eleventh-Century Byzantium. Visualizing the Middle Ages. Vol. 2. Brill Publishers. ISBN 9789004162716.
- Bithos, George P. (2001). Methodios I Patriarch of Constantinople: Churchman, Politician and Confessor for the Faith (Doctoral). Durham Theses. Durham University.
- Chisholm, Hugh, ed. (1911). Encyclopædia Britannica. Vol. 26 (11 ed.). Cambridge University Press. ISBN 9789004162716.
- Davis, Leo Donald (1987). The First Seven Ecumenical Councils (325-787): Their History and Theology. Theology and Life Series. Michael Glazier, Inc. ISBN 0894536168.
- Dragas, George Dion (2005). Ecclesiasticus II: Orthodox Icons, Saints, Feasts and Praye. Orthodox Research Institute. ISBN 0974561800.
- Garland, Lynda (1999). Byzantine Empresses: Women and Power in Byzantium AD 527-1204. Routledge. ISBN 0415146887.
- Gouillard, Jean (1967). Travaux et mémoires. E. de Boccard.
- Hindson, Ed; Mitchell, Dan R., eds. (2013). The Popular Encyclopedia of Church History: The People, Places, and Events that Shaped Christianity. Harvest House. ISBN 9780736948067.
- Hollingsworth, Paul A. (1991). Kazhdan, Alexander (ed.). The Oxford Dictionary of Byzantium. Oxford University Press. ISBN 0195046528.
- Humphreys, Mike (2021). A Companion to Byzantine Iconoclasm. Brill's Companions to the Christian Tradition. Vol. 99. Brill Publishers. ISBN 9789004462007.
- Mango, Cyril (1975). Liquidation of Iconoclasm and Patriarch Photios. Routledge.
- Talbot, Alice-Mary (1998). Byzantine Defenders of Images: Eight Saints' Lives in English Translation. Dumbarton Oaks Byzantine Saints Lives. Dumbarton Oaks. ISBN 0884022684.
- Treadgold, W.T. (1979). "The Chronological Accuracy of the Chronicle of Symeon the Logothete for the Years 813-845". Dumbarton Oaks Papers Washington, D.C. Vol. 33. Dumbarton Oaks.
- Treadgold, Warren (1998). A History of the Byzantine State and Society. Stanford University Press. ISBN 9780804726306.
