= Rublev =

Rublev is a Russian surname Рублёв (Rublyov). Notable people with the surname include:

- Andrei Rublev, Russian icon painter
- Andrey Rublev (born 1997), Russian tennis player

== See also ==
- Andrei Rublev (film)
- Rubley
