= Byzantine Iconoclasm =

Periods in Byzantine history during which religious images were banned

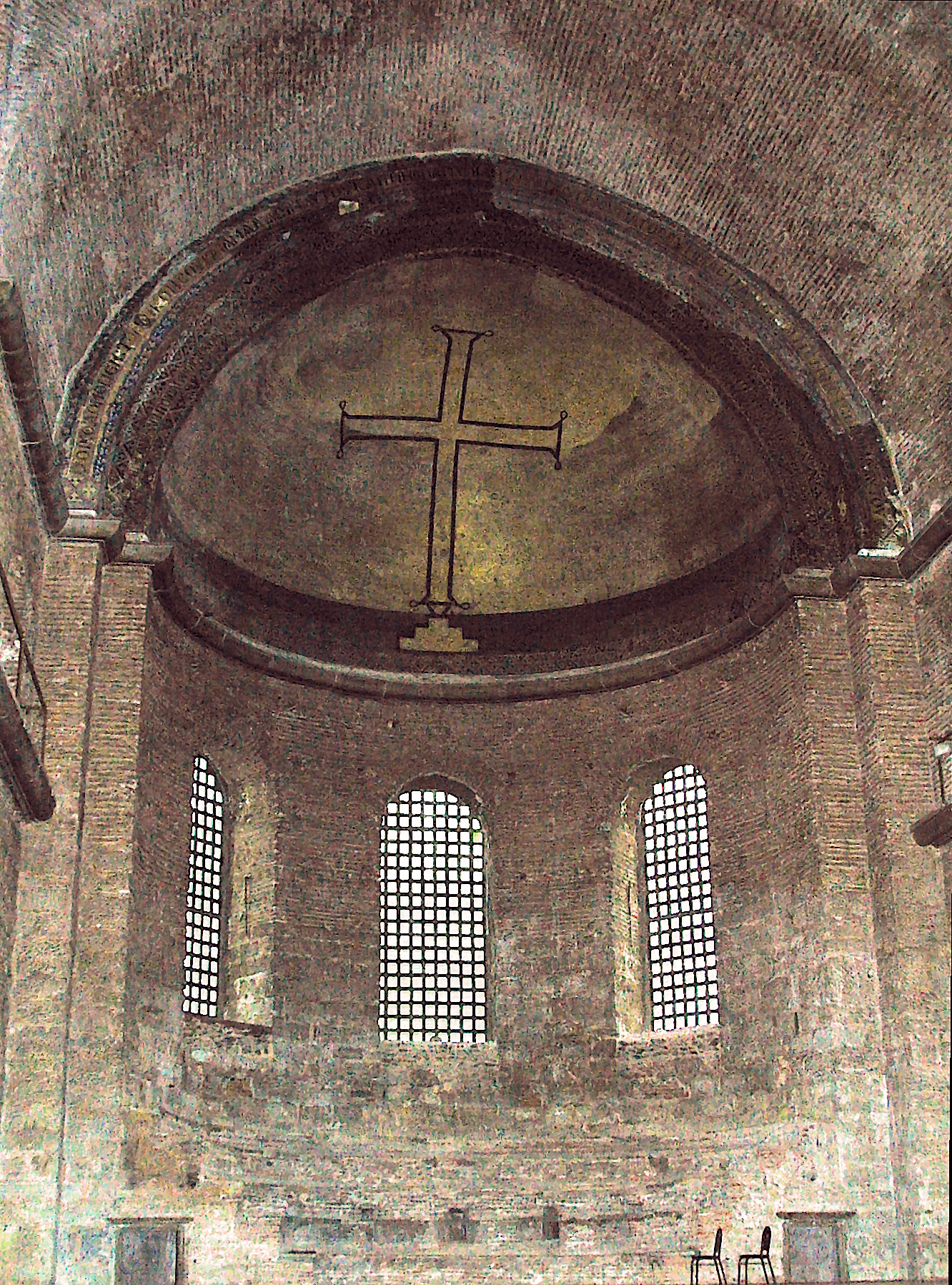
A simple cross: example of iconoclastic art in the Hagia Irene church in Istanbul

The Byzantine Iconoclasm (Ancient Greek: Εἰκονομαχία, romanized: Eikonomachía, lit. 'image struggle', 'war on icons') refers to two periods in the history of the Byzantine Empire when the use of religious images or icons was opposed by religious and imperial authorities within the Ecumenical Patriarchate (at the time still comprising the Roman-Latin and the Eastern-Orthodox traditions) and the temporal imperial hierarchy, leading to several civil wars during the strife. The First Iconoclasm, as it is sometimes called, occurred between about 726 and 787, while the Second Iconoclasm occurred between 814 and 842. According to the traditional view, Byzantine Iconoclasm was started by a ban on religious images promulgated by the Byzantine Emperor Leo III the Isaurian, and continued under his successors. It was accompanied by widespread destruction of religious images and persecution of supporters of the veneration of images. The Papacy remained firmly in support of the use of religious images throughout the period, and the whole episode widened the growing divergence between the Byzantine and Carolingian traditions in what was still a unified European Church, as well as facilitating the reduction or removal of Byzantine political control over parts of the Italian Peninsula.

Iconoclasm is the deliberate destruction within a culture of the culture's own religious images and other symbols or monuments, usually for religious or political motives. People who engage in or support iconoclasm are called iconoclasts, Greek for 'breakers of icons' (εἰκονοκλάσται), a term that has come to be applied figuratively to any person who breaks or disdains established dogmata or conventions. Conversely, people who revere or venerate religious images are derisively called "iconolaters" (εἰκονολάτρες). They are normally known as "iconodules" (εἰκονόδουλοι), or "iconophiles" (εἰκονόφιλοι). These terms were, however, not a part of the Byzantine debate over images. They have been brought into common usage by modern historians (from the seventeenth century) and their application to Byzantium increased considerably in the late twentieth century. The Byzantine term for the debate over religious imagery, iconomachy, means "struggle over images" or "image struggle". Some sources also say that the Iconoclasts were against intercession to the saints and denied the usage of relics; however, it is disputed.

Iconoclasm was motivated theologically by the Biblical commandment "Thou shalt not make unto thee any graven image", which iconoclasts interpreted as a prohibition against the making, veneration and worshipping of icons. The two periods of iconoclasm in the Byzantine Empire during the 8th and 9th centuries made use of this theological theme in discussions over the propriety of images of holy figures, including Christ, the Virgin Mary (or Theotokos) and saints. It was a debate triggered by changes in Orthodox worship, which were themselves generated by the major social and political upheavals of the seventh century for the Byzantine Empire.

Traditional explanations for Byzantine iconoclasm have sometimes focused on the importance of Islamic prohibitions against images influencing Byzantine thought. According to Arnold J. Toynbee, for example, it was the prestige of Islamic military successes in the 7th and 8th centuries that motivated Byzantine Christians to adopt the Islamic position of rejecting and destroying devotional and liturgical images. The role of women and monks in supporting the veneration of images has also been asserted. Social and class-based arguments have been put forward, such as that iconoclasm created political and economic divisions in Byzantine society; that it was generally supported by the Eastern, poorer, non-Greek peoples of the Empire who had to constantly deal with Arab raids. On the other hand, the wealthier Greeks of Constantinople and also the peoples of the Balkan and Italian provinces strongly opposed Iconoclasm. The claim of such a geographical distribution has, however, been disputed. Byzantine iconoclasm influenced the later Protestant reformation.

== Background ==
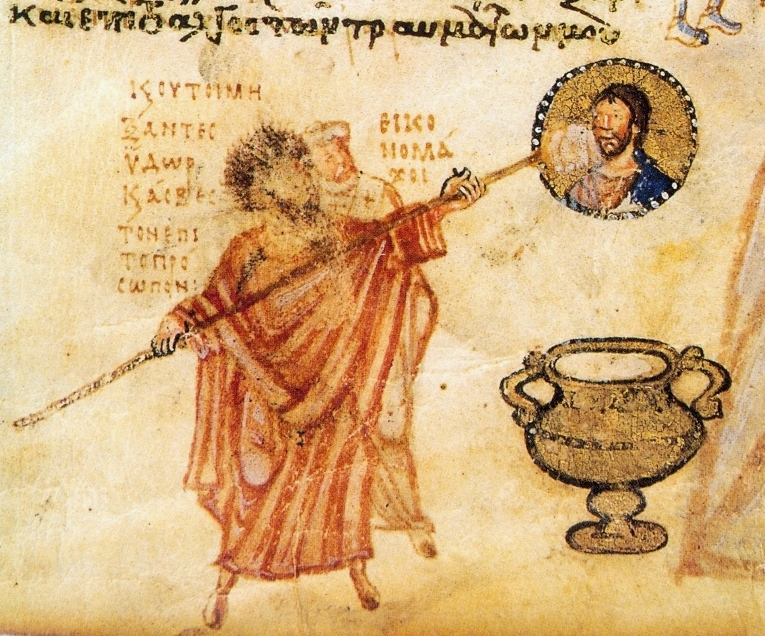
Byzantine Iconoclasm, Chludov Psalter, 9th century.

Christian worship by the sixth century had developed a clear belief in the intercession of saints. This belief was also influenced by a concept of hierarchy of sanctity, with the Trinity at its pinnacle, followed by the Virgin Mary, referred to in Greek as the Theotokos ("birth-giver of God") or Meter Theou ("Mother of God"), the saints, living holy men, women, and spiritual elders, followed by the rest of humanity. Thus, in order to obtain blessings or divine favour, early Christians, like Christians today, would often pray or ask an intermediary, such as the saints or the Theotokos, or living fellow Christians believed to be holy, to intercede on their behalf with Christ. A strong sacramentality and belief in the importance of physical presence also joined the belief in intercession of saints with the use of relics and holy images (or icons) in early Christian practices.

Believers would, therefore, make pilgrimages to places sanctified by the physical presence of Christ or prominent saints and martyrs, such as the site of the Holy Sepulchre in Jerusalem. Relics, or holy objects (rather than places), which were a part of the claimed remains of, or had supposedly come into contact with, Christ, the Virgin or a saint, were also widely utilized in Christian practices at this time. Relics, a firmly embedded part of veneration by this period, provided physical presence of the divine but were not infinitely reproducible (an original relic was required), and still usually required believers to undertake pilgrimage or have contact with somebody who had.

The use of images had greatly increased during this period, and had generated a growing opposition among many in the church, although the progress and extent of these views is now unclear. Images in the form of mosaics and paintings were widely used in churches, homes and other places such as over city gates, and had since the reign of Justinian I been increasingly taking on a spiritual significance of their own, and regarded at least in the popular mind as capable of possessing capacities in their own right, so that "the image acts or behaves as the subject itself is expected to act or behave. It makes known its wishes ... It enacts evangelical teachings, ... When attacked it bleeds, ... [and] In some cases it defends itself against infidels with physical force ...". Key artefacts to blur this boundary emerged in c. 570 in the form of acheiropoieta, images claimed to have been created miraculously or "not by human hands". These sacred images were a form of contact relic, which additionally were taken to prove divine approval of the use of icons. The two most famous were the Mandylion of Edessa (where it still remained) and the Image of Camuliana from Cappadocia, by then in Constantinople. The latter was already regarded as a palladium that had won battles and saved Constantinople from the Persian-Avar siege of 626, when the Patriarch paraded it around the walls of the city. Both were images of Christ, and at least in some versions of their stories supposedly made when Christ pressed a cloth to his face (compare with the later, western Veil of Veronica and Turin shroud). In other versions of the Mandylion's story it joined a number of other images that were believed to have been painted from the life in the New Testament period by Saint Luke or other human painters, and these stories were used to support the notion that Christ and the Virgin supported the icons and that they had been used continuously in Christianity since its start. G. E. von Grunebaum has said "The iconoclasm of the eighth and ninth centuries must be viewed as the climax of a movement that had its roots in the spirituality of the Christian concept of the divinity."

The events of the seventh century, which was a period of major crisis for the Byzantine Empire, formed a catalyst for the expansion of the use of images of the holy and caused a dramatic shift in responses to them. Whether the acheiropoieta were a symptom or cause, the late sixth to eighth centuries witnessed the increasing thinning of the boundary between images not made by human hands, and images made by human hands. Images of Christ, the Theotokos and saints increasingly came to be regarded, as relics, contact relics and acheiropoieta already were, as points of access to the divine. By praying before an image of a holy figure, the believer's prayers were magnified by proximity to the holy. This change in practice seems to have been a major and organic development in Christian worship, which responded to the needs of believers to have access to divine support during the insecurities of the seventh century. It was not a change orchestrated or controlled by the Church. Although the Quinisext council in 692 did not explicitly state that images should be prayed to, it stated that images of Christ had to render him in human form (instead of for example symbolically as a lamb) to testify to his human incarnation. Because Jesus manifested himself as human it was acceptable to make images of him just like it was acceptable to make images of the saints and other humans. The events which have traditionally been labelled 'Byzantine Iconoclasm' may be seen as the efforts of the organised Church and the imperial authorities to respond to these changes and to try to reassert some institutional control over popular practice.

The rise of Islam in the seventh century had also caused some consideration of the use of holy images. Early Islamic belief stressed the impropriety of iconic representation. Earlier scholarship tried to link Byzantine Iconoclasm directly to Islam by arguing that Byzantine emperors saw the success of the early Caliphate and decided that Byzantine use of images (as opposed to Islamic aniconism) had angered God. This does not seem entirely plausible however. The use of images had probably been increasing in the years leading up to the outbreak of iconoclasm. One notable change came in 695, when Justinian II put a full-faced image of Christ on the obverse of his gold coins. The effect on iconoclast opinion is unknown, but the change certainly caused Caliph Abd al-Malik to break permanently with his previous adoption of Byzantine coin types to start a purely Islamic coinage with lettering only. This appears more like two opposed camps asserting their positions (pro and anti images) than one empire seeking to imitate the other. More striking is the fact that Islamic iconoclasm rejected any depictions of living people or animals, not only religious images. By contrast, Byzantine iconomachy concerned itself only with the question of the holy presence (or lack thereof) of images. Thus, although the rise of Islam may have created an environment in which images were at the forefront of intellectual question and debate, Islamic iconoclasm does not seem to have had a direct causal role in the development of the Byzantine image debate; in fact Muslim territories became havens for iconophile refugees. However, it has been argued that Leo III, because of his Syrian background, could have been influenced by Islamic beliefs and practices, which could have inspired his first removal of images.

The goal of the iconoclasts was to restore the church to the strict opposition to images in worship that they believed characterized at the least some parts of the early church. Theologically, one aspect of the debate, as with most in Christian theology at the time, revolved around the two natures of Jesus. Iconoclasts believed that icons could not represent both the divine and the human natures of the Messiah at the same time, but only separately. Because an icon which depicted Jesus as purely physical would be Nestorianism, and one which showed Him as both human and divine would not be able to do so without confusing the two natures into one mixed nature, which was Monophysitism, all icons were thus heretical. Leo III did preach a series of sermons in which he drew attention to the excessive behaviour of the iconodules, which Leo III stated was in direct opposition to Mosaic Law as shown in the Second Commandment. However, no detailed writings setting out iconoclast arguments have survived; we have only brief quotations and references in the writings of the iconodules and the nature of Biblical law in Christianity has always been in dispute.

== Geographical distribution ==
Newer studies have discredited the former theory that Iconoclasm was primarily concentrated in the eastern regions of the Empire; the prevalence of Iconoclasm had nothing to do with distance from the eastern (Arab) border, suggesting that the spread of iconoclasm was independent of direct Islamic influence. For instance, western regions such as the Cyclades contain evidence of iconoclastic loyalties from church decoration, while eastern areas such as Cyprus (then jointly-ruled by the Byzantines and the Arabs) maintained a continuous tradition of icons. Instead, iconodules escaped Iconoclasm by fleeing to peripheral regions away from the iconoclastic imperial authority in both west (Italy and Dalmatia) and east, such as Cyprus, the southern coast of Anatolia, and eastern Pontus. It is also possible that the concentration of Iconoclasm in the eastern Anatolian areas of Isauria, Chaldia and Cappadocia was the result of the military victories of the Isaurian emperors in this border area against the Arabs, as well as the strong imperial authority established in this area.

== Sources ==
A thorough understanding of the Iconoclast period in Byzantium is complicated by the fact that most of the surviving sources were written by the ultimate victors in the controversy, the iconodules. It is thus difficult to obtain a complete, objective, balanced, and reliably accurate account of events and various aspects of the controversy. The period was marked by intensely polarized debate amongst at least the clergy, and both sides came to regard the position of the other as heresy, and accordingly made efforts to destroy the writings of the other side when they had the chance. Leo III is said to have ordered the destruction of iconodule texts at the start of the controversy, and the records of the final Second Council of Nicaea record that books with missing pages were reported and produced to the council. Many texts, including works of hagiography and historical writing as well as sermons and theological writings, were undoubtedly "improved", fabricated or backdated by partisans, and the difficult and highly technical scholarly process of attempting to assess the real authors and dates of many surviving texts remains ongoing. Most iconoclastic texts are simply missing, including a proper record of the council of 754, and the detail of iconoclastic arguments have mostly to be reconstructed with difficulty from their vehement rebuttals by iconodules.

Major historical sources for the period include the chronicles of Theophanes the Confessor and the Patriarch Nikephoros, both of whom were ardent iconodules. Many historians have also drawn on hagiography, most notably the Life of St. Stephen the Younger, which includes a detailed, but highly biased, account of persecutions during the reign of Constantine V. No account of the period in question written by an iconoclast has been preserved, although certain saints' lives do seem to preserve elements of the iconoclast worldview.

Major theological sources include the writings of John of Damascus, Theodore the Studite, and the Patriarch Nikephoros, all of them iconodules. The theological arguments of the iconoclasts survive only in the form of selective quotations embedded in iconodule documents, most notably the Acts of the Second Council of Nicaea and the Antirrhetics of Nikephoros.

== The first iconoclast period: 730–787 ==
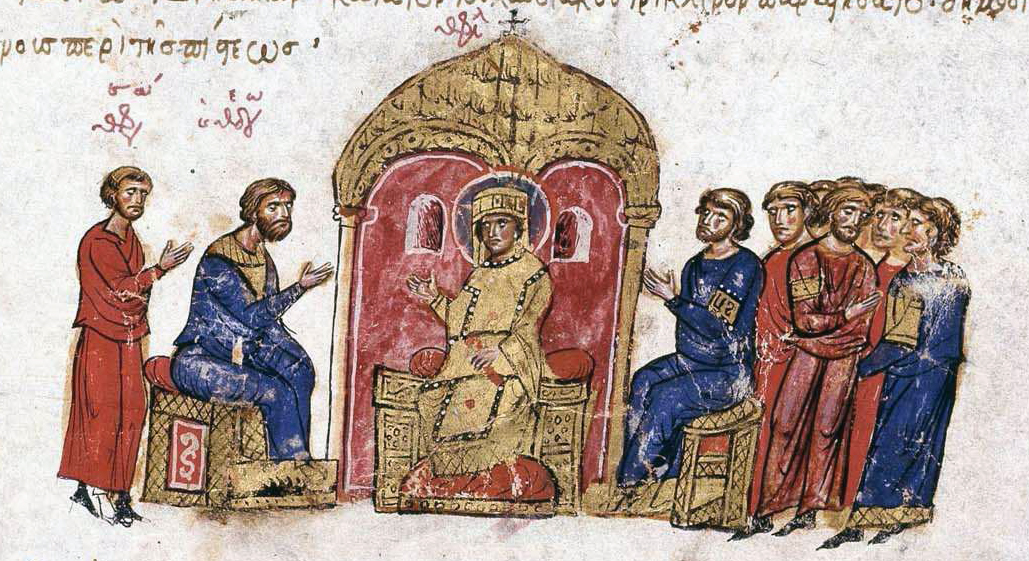
Argument about icons before the emperor, in the Skylitzis Chronicle

An immediate precursor of the controversy seems to have been a large submarine volcanic eruption in the summer of 726 in the Aegean Sea between the island of Thera (modern Santorini) and Therasia, probably causing tsunamis and great loss of life. Many, probably including Leo III, interpreted this as a judgment on the Empire by God, and decided that use of images had been the offense.

The classic account of the beginning of Byzantine Iconoclasm relates that sometime between 726 and 730 the Byzantine Emperor Leo III the Isaurian ordered the removal of an image of Christ, prominently placed over the Chalke Gate, the ceremonial entrance to the Great Palace of Constantinople, and its replacement with a cross. Fearing that they intended sacrilege, some of those who were assigned to the task were murdered by a band of iconodules. Accounts of this event (written significantly later) suggest that at least part of the reason for the removal may have been military reversals against the Muslims and the eruption of the volcanic island of Thera, which Leo possibly viewed as evidence of the Wrath of God brought on by image veneration in the Church.

Leo is said to have described mere image veneration as "a craft of idolatry." He apparently forbade the veneration of religious images in a 730 edict, which did not apply to other forms of art, including the image of the emperor, or religious symbols such as the cross. "He saw no need to consult the Church, and he appears to have been surprised by the depth of the popular opposition he encountered". Germanos I of Constantinople, the iconophile Patriarch of Constantinople, either resigned or was deposed following the ban. Surviving letters Germanos wrote at the time say little of theology. According to Patricia Karlin-Hayter, what worried Germanos was that the ban of icons would prove that the Church had been in error for a long time and therefore play into the hands of Jews and Muslims.

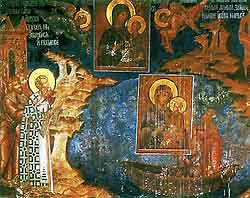
Patriarch Germanos I of Constantinople with icons supported by angels

This interpretation is now in doubt, and the debate and struggle may have initially begun in the provinces rather than in the imperial court. Letters survive written by the Patriarch Germanos in the 720s and 730s concerning Constantine, the bishop of Nakoleia, and Thomas of Klaudioupolis. In both sets of letters (the earlier ones concerning Constantine, the later ones Thomas), Germanos reiterates a pro-image position while lamenting the behavior of his subordinates in the church, who apparently had both expressed reservations about image worship. Germanos complains "now whole towns and multitudes of people are in considerable agitation over this matter". In both cases, efforts to persuade these men of the propriety of image veneration had failed and some steps had been taken to remove images from their churches. Significantly, in these letters, Germanos does not threaten his subordinates if they fail to change their behavior. He does not seem to refer to a factional split in the church, but rather to an ongoing issue of concern, and Germanos refers to Emperor Leo III, often presented as the original Iconoclast, as a friend of images. Germanos' concerns are mainly that the actions of Constantine and Thomas should not confuse the laity.

At this stage in the debate, there is no clear evidence for an imperial involvement in the debate, except that Germanos says he believes that Leo III supports images, leaving a question as to why Leo III has been presented as the arch-iconoclast of Byzantine history. Almost all of the evidence for the reign of Leo III is derived from textual sources, the majority of which post-date his reign considerably, most notably the Life of St. Stephen the Younger and the Chronicle of Theophanes the Confessor. These important sources are fiercely iconophile and are hostile to the Emperor Constantine V (741–775). As Constantine's father, Leo also became a target. Leo's actual views on icon veneration remain obscure, but in any case, may not have influenced the initial phase of the debate.

During this initial period, concern on both sides seems to have had little to do with theology and more with practical evidence and effects. There was initially no church council, and no prominent patriarchs or bishops called for the removal or destruction of icons. In the process of destroying or obscuring images, Leo is said to have "confiscated valuable church plate, altar cloths, and reliquaries decorated with religious figures", but he took no severe action against the former patriarch or iconophile bishops.

In the West, Pope Gregory III held two synods at Rome and condemned Leo's actions, and in response, Leo confiscated papal estates in Calabria and Sicily, detaching them as well as Illyricum from Papal governance and placing them under the governance of the Patriarch of Constantinople.

=== Ecumenical councils ===
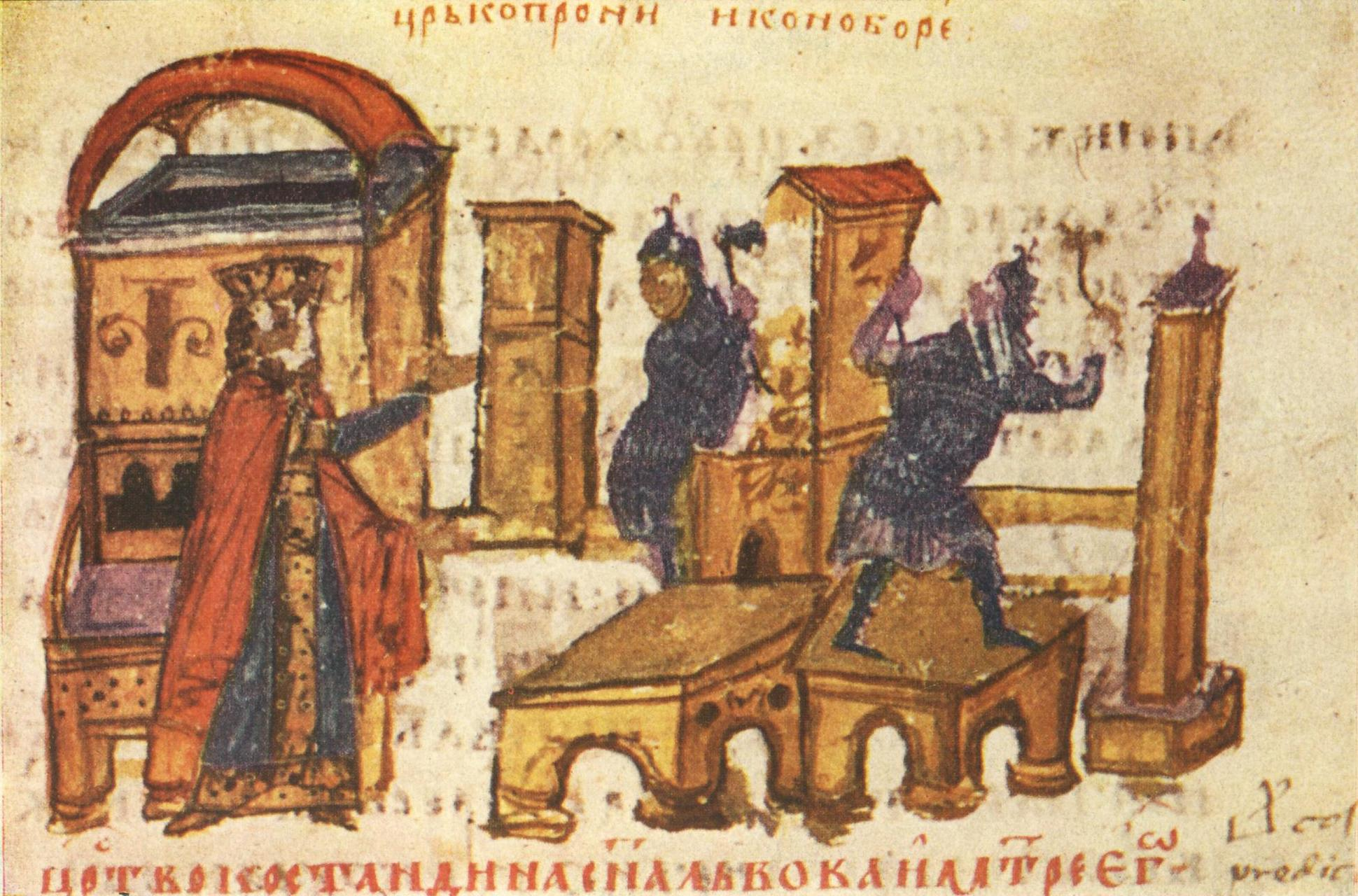
14th-century miniature of the destruction of a church under the orders of the iconoclast emperor Constantine V Copronymus

Leo died in 741, and his son and heir, Constantine V (741–775), was personally committed to an anti-image position. Despite his successes as an emperor, both militarily and culturally, this has caused Constantine to be remembered unfavorably by a body of source material that is preoccupied with his opposition to image veneration. For example, he is accused of being obsessive in his hostility to images and monks; because of this he burned monasteries and images and turned churches into stables, according to the surviving iconophile sources. In 754, Constantine summoned the Council of Hieria, which was the first church council to concern itself primarily with religious imagery. Constantine seems to have been closely involved with the council, and it endorsed an iconoclast position, with 338 assembled bishops declaring, "the unlawful art of painting living creatures blasphemed the fundamental doctrine of our salvation--namely, the Incarnation of Christ, and contradicted the six holy synods. ... If anyone shall endeavor to represent the forms of the Saints in lifeless pictures with material colors which are of no value (for this notion is vain and introduced by the devil), and does not rather represent their virtues as living images in himself, etc. ... let him be anathema." This Council claimed to be the legitimate "Seventh Ecumenical Council", but its legitimacy is now disregarded by both Orthodox and Catholic traditions as no patriarchs or representatives of the five patriarchs were present: Constantinople was vacant while Antioch, Jerusalem, and Alexandria were controlled by Muslims, and Rome did not send a representative.

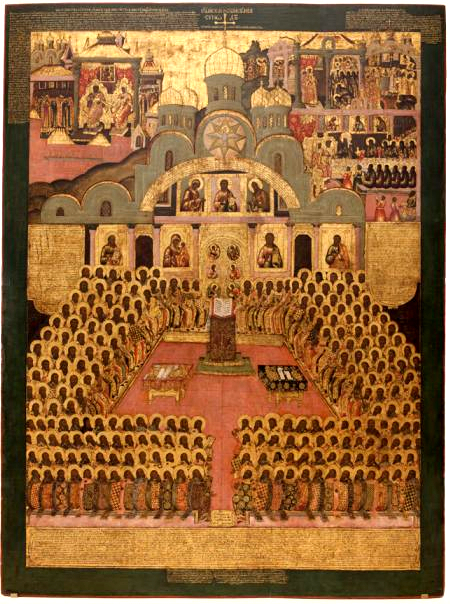
An icon of the Seventh Ecumenical Council (17th century, Novodevichy Convent, Moscow)

The iconoclast Council of Hieria was not the end of the matter, however. In this period, complex theological arguments appeared, both for and against the use of icons. Constantine himself wrote opposing the veneration of images, while John of Damascus, a Syrian monk living outside of Byzantine territory, became a major opponent of iconoclasm through his theological writings.

It has been suggested that monasteries became secret bastions of icon support, but this view is controversial. A possible reason for this interpretation is the desire in some historiography on Byzantine Iconoclasm to see it as a preface to the later Protestant Reformation in western Europe, which was opposed to monastic establishments. In opposition to this view, others have suggested that while some monks continued to support image veneration, many others followed church and imperial policy.

The surviving sources accuse Constantine V of moving against monasteries, having relics thrown into the sea, and stopping the invocation of saints. Monks were forced to parade in the Hippodrome, each hand-in-hand with a woman, in violation of their vows. In 765, St Stephen the Younger was killed, and was later considered a martyr to the Iconophile cause. A number of large monasteries in Constantinople were secularised, and many monks fled to areas beyond effective imperial control on the fringes of the Empire.

Constantine's son, Leo IV (775–780), was less rigorous, and for a time tried to mediate between the factions. When he died, his wife Irene took power as regent for their son, Constantine VI (780–797). Though icon veneration does not seem to have been a major priority for the regency government, Irene called an ecumenical council a year after Leo's death, which restored image veneration. This may have been an effort to secure closer and more cordial relations between Constantinople and Rome. The new ecumenical council, ultimately called the Second Council of Nicaea, first met in Constantinople in 786 but was disrupted by military units faithful to the iconoclast legacy and convened again at Nicaea in 787. This council reversed the decrees of the previous iconoclast Council of Hieria, and appropriated its title as Seventh Ecumenical Council. Thus there were two councils called the "Seventh Ecumenical Council," the first supporting iconoclasm, the second supporting icon veneration.

Unlike the iconoclast council, the iconophile council included papal representatives, and its decrees were approved by the papacy. The Orthodox Church considers it to be the last genuine ecumenical council. Icon veneration lasted through the reign of Empress Irene's successor, Nikephoros I (reigned 802–811), and the two brief reigns after his.

==== Decree of the Second council of Nicaea ====
On October 13, 787, the Second Council of Nicaea decreed that 'venerable and holy images are to be dedicated in the holy churches of God, namely the image of our Lord and God and Saviour Jesus Christ, of our immaculate Lady the Holy Theotokos, and of the angels and all the saints. They are to be accorded the veneration of honor, not indeed the true worship paid to the divine nature alone, but in the same way, as this is accorded to the life-giving cross, the holy gospels, and other sacred offerings' (trans. Price, The Acts of the Second Council of Nicaea [Liverpool 2018], 564-5, abbreviated).

== The second iconoclast period: 814–843 ==
Emperor Leo V the Armenian instituted a second period of Iconoclasm in 815, again possibly motivated by military failures seen as indicators of divine displeasure, and a desire to replicate the military success of Constantine V. The Byzantines had suffered a series of humiliating defeats at the hands of the Bulgarian Khan Krum, in the course of which emperor Nikephoros I had been killed in battle and emperor Michael I Rangabe had been forced to abdicate. In June 813, a month before the coronation of Leo V, a group of soldiers broke into the imperial mausoleum in the Church of the Holy Apostles, opened the sarcophagus of Constantine V, and implored him to return and save the empire.

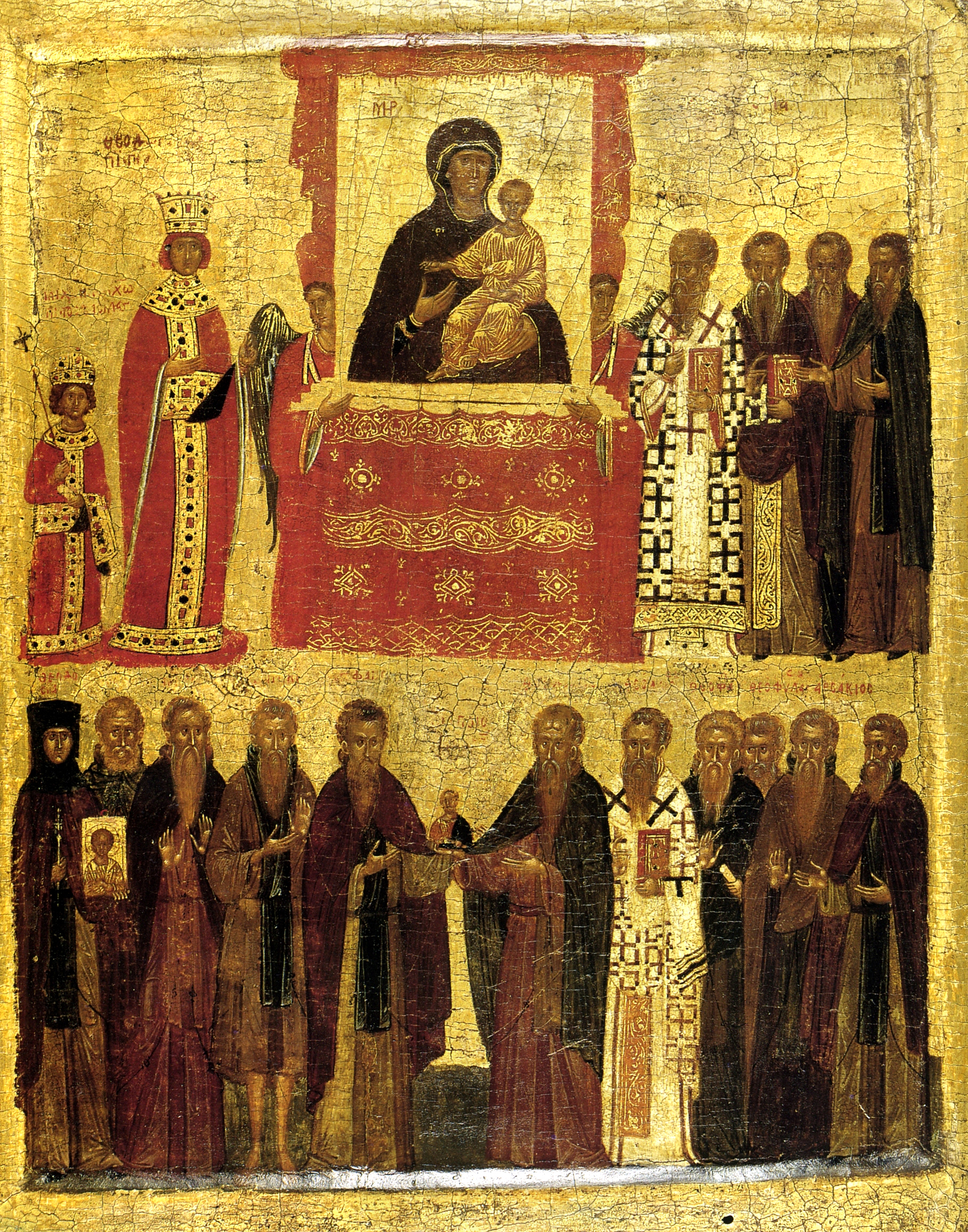
Late 14th-early 15th century icon illustrating the "Triumph of Orthodoxy" under the Byzantine empress Theodora over iconoclasm in 843. (National Icon Collection 18, British Museum).

Soon after his accession, Leo V began to discuss the possibility of reviving iconoclasm with a variety of people, including priests, monks, and members of the senate. He is reported to have remarked to a group of advisors that:

all the emperors, who took up images and venerated them, met their death either in revolt or in war; but those who did not venerate images all died a natural death, remained in power until they died, and were then laid to rest with all honors in the imperial mausoleum in the Church of the Holy Apostles.

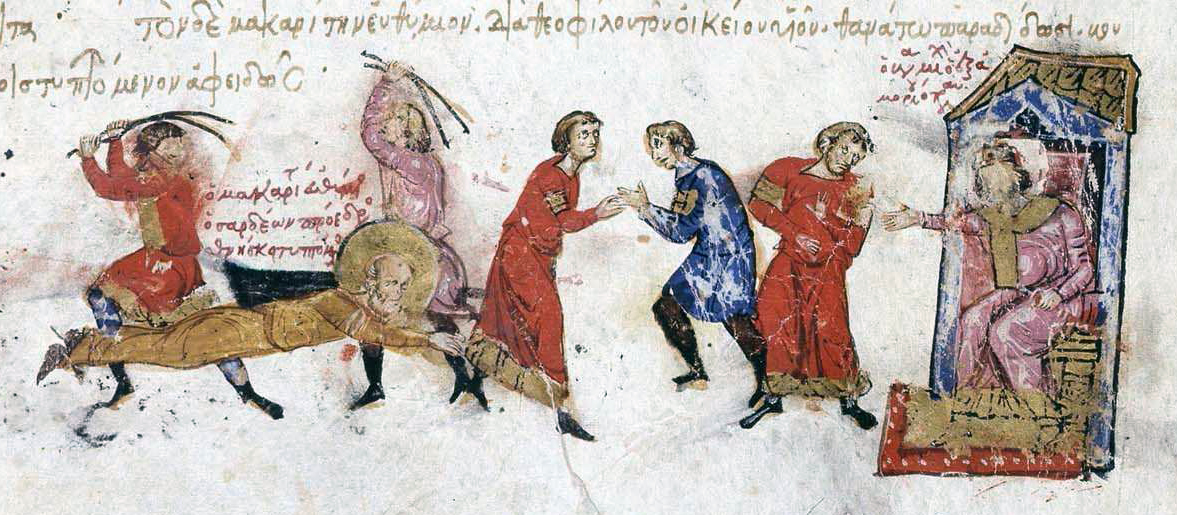
The torture and martyrdom of the iconophile Bishop Euthymius of Sardeis by the iconoclast Byzantine Emperor Michael II in 824, in a 13th-century manuscript

Leo next appointed a "commission" of monks "to look into the old books" and reach a decision on the veneration of images. They soon discovered the acts of the Iconoclastic Synod of 754. A first debate followed between Leo's supporters and the clerics who continued to advocate the veneration of icons, the latter group being led by the Patriarch Nikephoros, which led to no resolution. However, Leo had apparently become convinced by this point of the correctness of the iconoclast position, and had the icon of the Chalke gate, which Leo III is fictitiously claimed to have removed once before, replaced with a cross. In 815 the revival of iconoclasm was rendered official by a Synod held in the Hagia Sophia.

Leo was succeeded by Michael II, who in an 824 letter to the Carolingian emperor Louis the Pious lamented the appearance of image veneration in the church and such practices as making icons baptismal godfathers to infants. He confirmed the decrees of the Iconoclast Council of 754.

Michael was succeeded by his son, Theophilus. Theophilus died leaving his wife Theodora regent for his minor heir, Michael III. Like Irene 50 years before her, Theodora presided over the restoration of icon veneration in 843 at the Council of Constantinople, on the condition that Theophilus not be condemned. Since that time the first Sunday of Great Lent has been celebrated in the Orthodox Church and in Byzantine Rite Catholicism as the feast of the "Triumph of Orthodoxy".

== Arguments in the struggle over icons ==
=== Iconoclast arguments ===
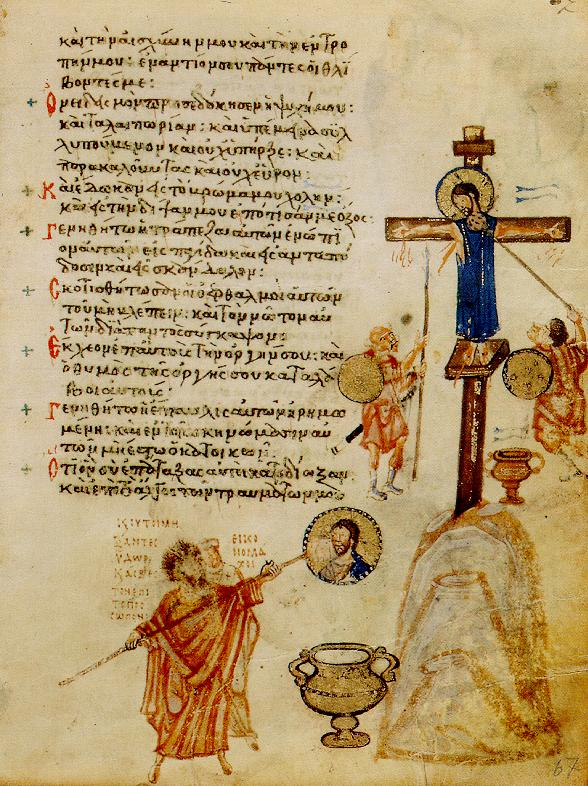
This page of the Iconodule Chludov Psalter, illustrates the line "They gave me gall to eat; and when I was thirsty they gave me vinegar to drink" with a picture of a soldier offering Christ vinegar on a sponge attached to a pole. Below is a picture of the last Iconoclast Patriarch of Constantinople, John VII rubbing out a painting of Christ with a similar sponge attached to a pole. John is caricatured, here as on other pages, with untidy straight hair sticking out in all directions, which was meant to portray him as wild and barbaric.

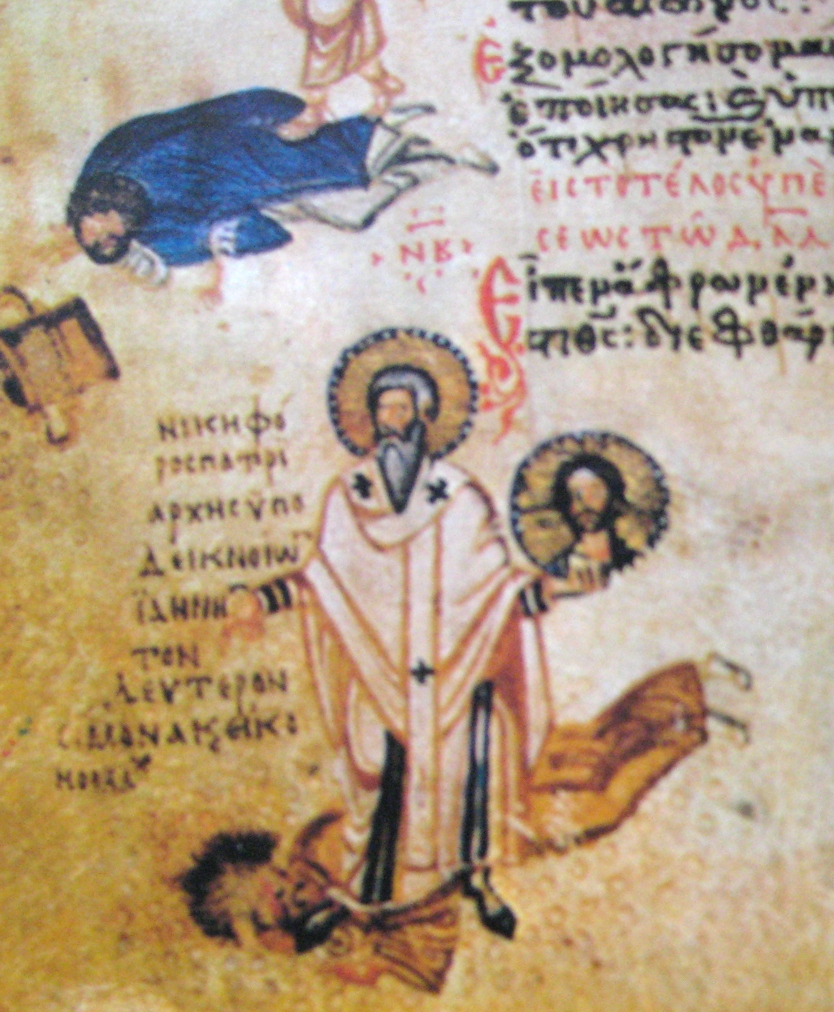
Nikephoros I of Constantinople upholding an icon and trampling John VII of Constantinople. Chludov Psalter.

What accounts of iconoclast arguments remain are largely found in quotations or summaries in iconodule writings. It is thus difficult to reconstruct a balanced view of the popularity or prevalence of iconoclast writings. The major theological arguments, however, remain in evidence because of the need in iconophile writings to record the positions being refuted. Debate seems to have centred on the validity of the depiction of Jesus, and the validity of images of other figures followed on from this for both sides. The main points of the iconoclast argument were:

1. Iconoclasm condemned the making of any lifeless image (e.g. painting or statue) that was intended to represent Jesus or one of the saints. The Epitome of the Definition of the Iconoclastic Conciliabulum held in 754 declared:
  "Supported by the Holy Scriptures and the Fathers, we declare unanimously, in the name of the Holy Trinity, that there shall be rejected and removed and cursed one of the Christian Church every likeness which is made out of any material and colour whatever by the evil art of painters.... If anyone ventures to represent the divine image (χαρακτήρ, kharaktír - character) of the Word after the Incarnation with material colours, he is an adversary of God. .... If anyone shall endeavour to represent the forms of the Saints in lifeless pictures with material colours which are of no value (for this notion is vain and introduced by the devil), and does not rather represent their virtues as living images in himself, he is an adversary of God"
2. For iconoclasts, the only real religious image must be an exact likeness of the prototype -of the same substance- which they considered impossible, seeing wood and paint as empty of spirit and life. Thus for iconoclasts the only true (and permitted) "icon" of Jesus was the Eucharist, the Body and Blood of Christ, according to Orthodox and Catholic doctrine.
3. Any true image of Jesus must be able to represent both his divine nature (which is impossible because it cannot be seen nor encompassed) and his human nature (which is possible). But by making an icon of Jesus, one is separating his human and divine natures, since only the human can be depicted (separating the natures was considered nestorianism), or else confusing the human and divine natures, considering them one (union of the human and divine natures was considered monophysitism).
4. Icon use for religious purposes was viewed as an inappropriate innovation in the Church, and a return to pagan practice.
  "Satan misled men, so that they worshipped the creature instead of the Creator. The Law of Moses and the Prophets cooperated to remove this ruin...But the previously mentioned demiurge of evil...gradually brought back idolatry under the appearance of Christianity."
  It was also seen as a departure from ancient church tradition, of which there was a written record opposing religious images. The Spanish Synod of Elvira Canon 36 states, "It has seemed good that images should not be in churches so that what is venerated and worshiped not be painted on the walls." Eusebius of Caesaria may have written a letter to Constantia (Emperor Constantine's sister) saying "To depict purely the human form of Christ before its transformation, on the other hand, is to break the commandment of God and to fall into pagan error"; (Note: The letter's text is incomplete, and its authenticity and authorship uncertain.) Bishop Epiphanius of Salamis wrote his letter 51 to John, Bishop of Jerusalem (c. 394) in which he recounted how he tore down an image in a church and admonished the other bishop that such images are "opposed … to our religion", although the authenticity of this letter has also long been disputed, and remains uncertain. However, as Christianity increasingly spread among gentiles with traditions of religious images, and especially after the conversion of Constantine (c. 312), the legalization of Christianity, and, later that century, the establishment of Christianity as the state religion of the Roman Empire, many new people came into the new large public churches, which began to be decorated with images that certainly drew in part on imperial and pagan imagery: "The representations of Christ as the Almighty Lord on his judgment throne owed something to pictures of Zeus. Portraits of the Mother of God were not wholly independent of a pagan past of venerated mother-goddesses. In the popular mind the saints had come to fill a role that had been played by heroes and deities."

=== Iconophile arguments ===
The chief theological opponents of iconoclasm were the monks Mansur (John of Damascus), who, living in Muslim territory as advisor to the Caliph of Damascus, was far enough away from the Byzantine emperor to evade retribution, and Theodore the Studite, abbot of the Stoudios monastery in Constantinople.

John declared that he did not worship matter, "but rather the creator of matter." He also declared, "But I also venerate the matter through which salvation came to me, as if filled with divine energy and grace." He includes in this latter category the ink in which the gospels were written as well as the paint of images, the wood of the Cross, and the body and blood of Jesus. This distinction between worship and veneration is key in the arguments of the iconophiles.

The iconophile response to iconoclasm included:

1. Assertion that the biblical commandment forbidding images of God had been superseded by the incarnation of Jesus, who, being the second person of the Trinity, is God incarnate in visible matter. Therefore, they were not depicting the invisible God, but God as He appeared in the flesh. They were able to adduce the issue of the incarnation in their favour, whereas the iconoclasts had used the issue of the incarnation against them. They also pointed to other Old Testament evidence: God instructed Moses to make two golden statues of cherubim on the lid of the Ark of the Covenant according to Exodus 25:18–22, and God also told Moses to embroider the curtain which separated the Holy of Holies in the Tabernacle tent with cherubim Exodus 26:31. Moses was also instructed by God to embroider the walls and roofs of the Tabernacle tent with figures of cherubim angels according to Exodus 26:1.
2. Further, in their view idols depicted persons without substance or reality while icons depicted real persons. Essentially the argument was that idols were idols because they represented false gods, not because they were images. Images of Christ, or of other real people who had lived in the past, could not be idols. This was considered comparable to the Old Testament practice of only offering burnt sacrifices to God, and not to any other gods.
3. Regarding the written tradition opposing the making and veneration of images, they asserted that icons were part of unrecorded oral tradition (parádosis, sanctioned in Catholicism and Orthodoxy as authoritative in doctrine by reference to Basil the Great, etc.), and pointed to patristic writings approving of icons, such as those of Asterius of Amasia, who was quoted twice in the record of the Second Council of Nicaea. What would have been useful evidence from modern art history as to the use of images in Early Christian art was unavailable to iconodules at the time.
4. Much was made of acheiropoieta, icons believed to be of divine origin, and miracles associated with icons. Both Christ and the Theotokos were believed in strong traditions to have sat on different occasions for their portraits to be painted.
5. Iconophiles further argued that decisions such as whether icons ought to be venerated were properly made by the church assembled in council, not imposed on the church by an emperor. Thus the argument also involved the issue of the proper relationship between church and state. Related to this was the observation that it was foolish to deny to God the same honor that was freely given to the human emperor, since portraits of the emperor were common and the iconoclasts did not oppose them.

Emperors had always intervened in ecclesiastical matters since the time of Constantine I. As Cyril Mango writes, "The legacy of Nicaea, the first universal council of the Church, was to bind the emperor to something that was not his concern, namely the definition and imposition of orthodoxy, if need be by force." That practice continued from beginning to end of the Iconoclast controversy and beyond, with some emperors enforcing iconoclasm, and two empresses regent enforcing the re-establishment of icon veneration.

== In art ==
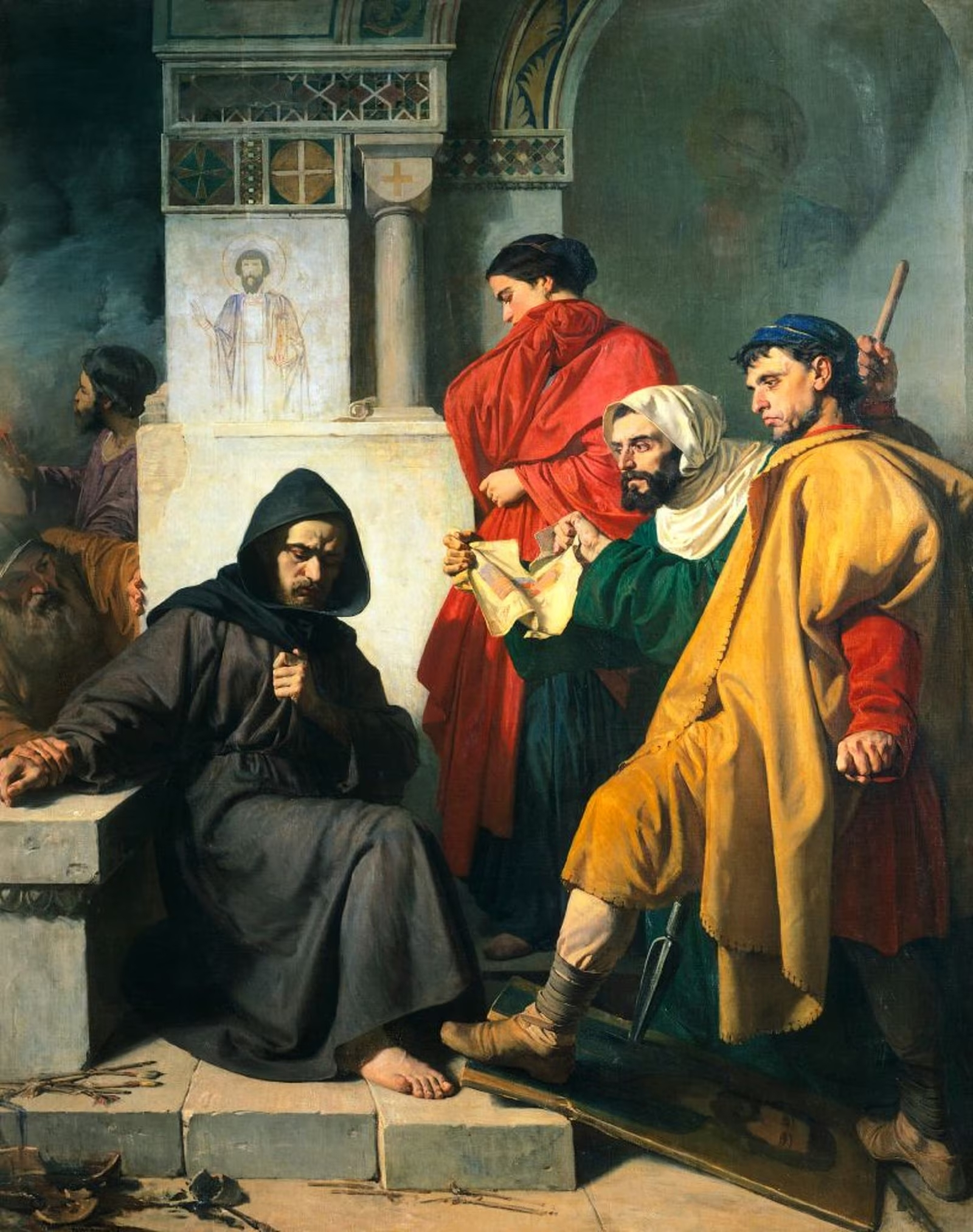
19th-century Italian painting, The Iconoclasts, by Domenico Morelli

The iconoclastic period has drastically reduced the number of survivals of Byzantine art from before the period, both in large religious mosaics, which are now almost exclusively found in Italy and Saint Catherine's Monastery in Egypt as well as portable icons. Important works in Thessaloniki were lost in the Great Thessaloniki Fire of 1917 and the Greco-Turkish War (1919–1922). A large mosaic of a church council in the Imperial Palace was replaced by lively secular scenes, and there was no issue with imagery per se.

The plain Iconoclastic cross that replaced a figurative mosaic by Emperor Constantine V in the apse of Hagia Irene in Constantinople is itself an almost unique survival, but careful inspection of some other buildings reveals similar changes. In Nicaea, photographs of the Church of the Dormition, taken before it was destroyed in 1922, show that a pre-iconoclasm standing Theotokos was replaced by a large cross, which was itself replaced by the new Theotokos seen in the photographs. The Image of Camuliana in Constantinople appears to have been destroyed, as mentions of it cease.

== Reaction in the West ==
The period of Iconoclasm decisively ended the so-called Byzantine Papacy under which, since the reign of Justinian I two centuries before, the popes in Rome had been initially nominated by, and later merely confirmed by, the emperor in Constantinople, and many of them had been Greek-speaking. By the end of the controversy the pope had approved the creation of a new emperor in the West, and the old deference of the Western church to Constantinople had gone. Opposition to icons seems to have had little support in the West and Rome took a consistently iconodule position.

When the struggles flared up, Pope Gregory II had been pope since 715, not long after accompanying his Syrian predecessor Pope Constantine to Constantinople, where they successfully resolved with Justinian II the issues arising from the decisions of the Quinisext Council of 692, which no Western prelates had attended. Of the delegation of 13 Gregory was one of only two non-Eastern; it was to be the last visit of a pope to the city until 1969. There had already been conflicts with Leo III over his very heavy taxation of areas under Papal jurisdiction.

The Iconoclast Controversy caused Papal-Imperial relations to plummet. Pope Gregory III declared an excommunication for all iconoclasts, and the Emperor sent an expedition to Rome which failed. In 754 the Emperor then seized the Papal properties in Sicily, Calabria and Illyria, and in the same year Pope Stephen II formed an alliance with the Frankish Kingdom, signalling the beginning of the end for Papal support of the Byzantine empire. This in turn would set into motion, events like creation of the Carolingian empire through Pope Leo III's crowning of Charlemagne, invoking translatio imperii & the Great Schism.

== See also ==
- Quotations related to Byzantine Iconoclasm at Wikiquote
- Aniconism in Christianity
- Feast of Orthodoxy
- Libri Carolini
