= Feast of Orthodoxy =

Feast observed in Orthodox Christianity

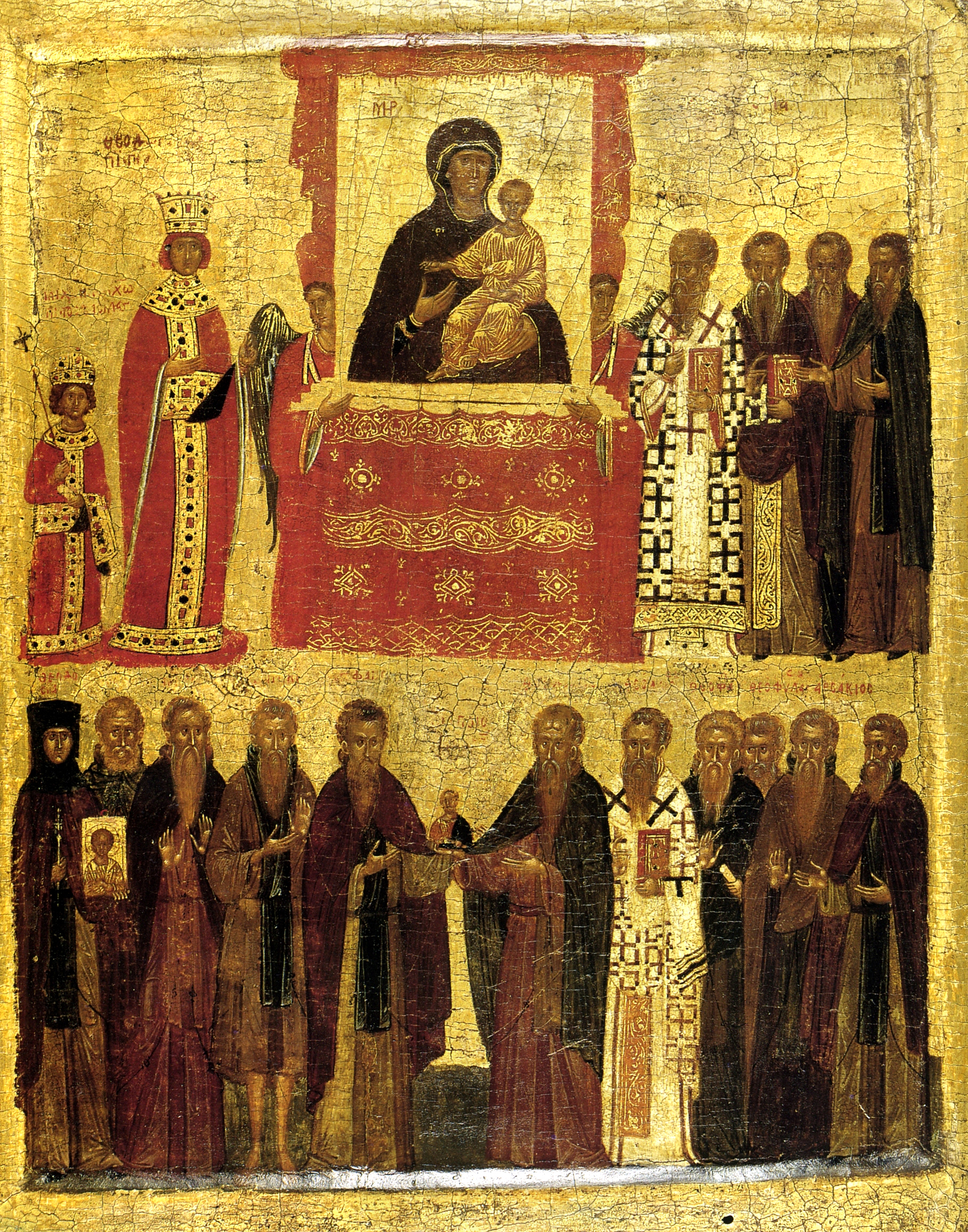
Icon of the Triumph of Orthodoxy illustrating the "Triumph of Orthodoxy" under the Byzantine empress Theodora and her son Michael III over iconoclasm in 843. Late 14th to early 15th century icon (National Icon Collection 18, British Museum).

The Feast of Orthodoxy (or Sunday of Orthodoxy or Triumph of Orthodoxy) is celebrated on the first Sunday of Great Lent in the Eastern Orthodox Church and other churches using the Byzantine Rite to commemorate, originally, only the final defeat of iconoclasm on the first Sunday of Lent in 843, and later also opposition to all heterodoxy.

== History ==
Despite the teaching about icons defined at the Seventh Ecumenical Council in 787, the iconoclasts began to trouble the Church again. After the death of the last iconoclast emperor, Theophilos, his young son Michael III, with his mother the regent Theodora, and Patriarch Methodios, summoned the Synod of Constantinople in 843 to bring peace to the Church. At the end of the first session, all made a triumphal procession from the Church of Blachernae to Hagia Sophia, restoring the icons to the church. This occurred on 11 March, 843 (which that year was the first Sunday of Lent). The Synod decreed that a perpetual feast on the anniversary of that day should be observed each year on the first Sunday of Great Lent, and named the day, "the Sunday of Orthodoxy" (ἡ Κυριακὴ τῆς Ὀρθοδοξίας).

== Service ==
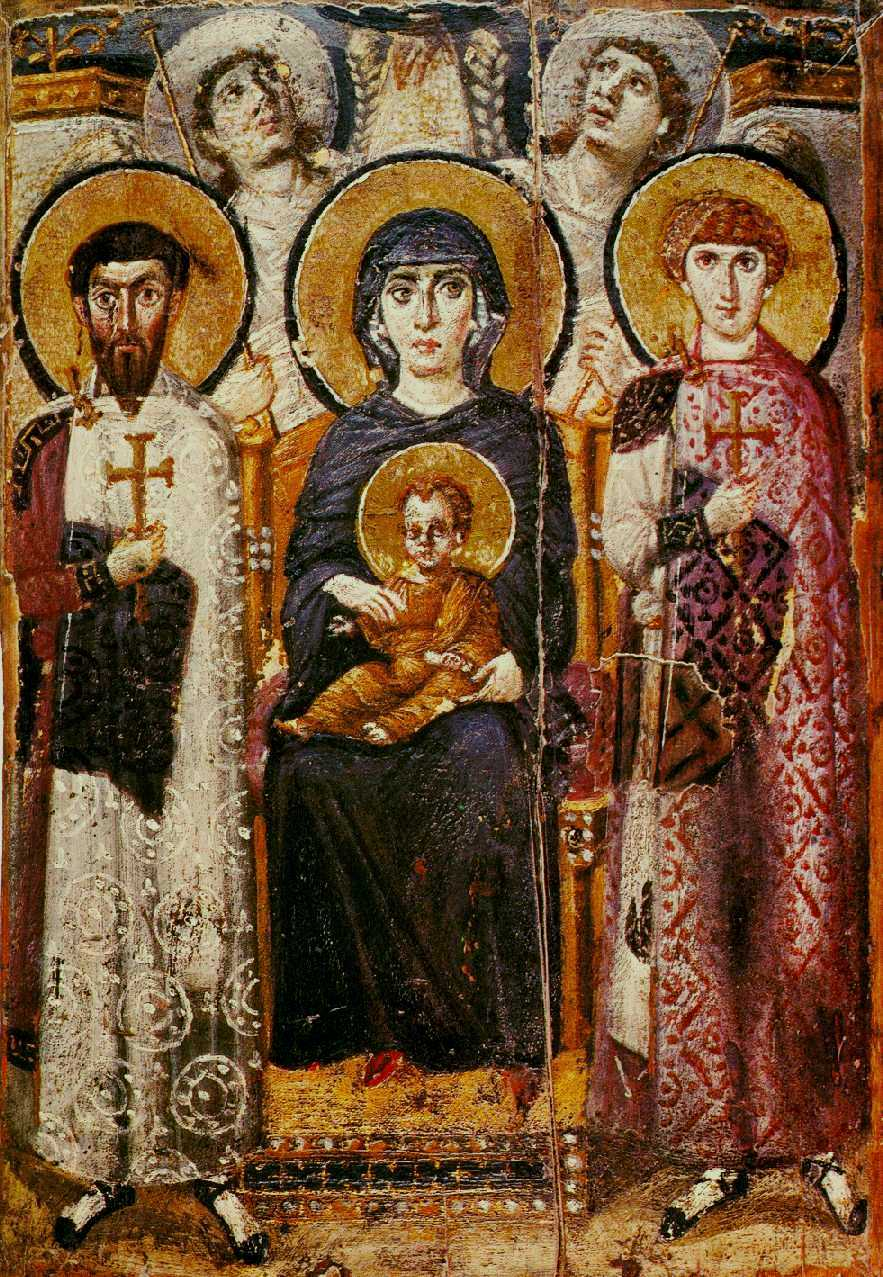
Icon of the Virgin and Child with angels and Sts. George and Theodore Stratelates, c. 600, one of a very few icons to survive Iconoclasm (encaustic on panel. Saint Catherine's Monastery, Mount Sinai).

A special service is celebrated in, usually, only cathedrals and monasteries.

After orthros (matins) or the Divine Liturgy, a procession is made with icons to some destined spot (often merely around the church). Meanwhile, a Canon, attributed to St. Theodore the Studite, is sung.

Once the procession arrives at the place, the Synodikon (decree of the Synod of Constantinople) is proclaimed aloud by the deacon. This Synodikon begins with the memory of certain saints, confessors and heroes of the faith, to each of whose names the people cry out: "Eternal Memory!" three times. Then follows a long list of heretics of all kinds, to each of which the answer is: "Anathema" once or thrice. These heretics comprise all the major opponents of the Orthodox Faith, Arians, Nestorians, Monophysites, Monothelites, Iconoclasts, and so on. Then comes again "Eternal Memory" to certain pious emperors, from Constantine the Great on.

There are inevitably differences between the Orthodox and Byzantine Catholic lists. The Orthodox acclaim Photius, Michael Cerularius, other anti-Roman patriarchs and many emperors. They curse Pope Honorius among the Monothelites, the opponents of Hesychasm. The Synodicon used by Greek-Catholics tends to omit a large number of these names. Also, there are minor differences between the Synodika of individual autocephalous churches.

In Greek usage, the Creed is normally recited by the cantors in the Divine Liturgy, but on the Sunday of Orthodoxy especially it is often recited by a lay member of the congregation who is a secular official; it is a prerogative offered to the head of State, if present, in continuation of the same privilege held by the Emperors.

The service as it had been used in the Russian Empire differed, with the Emperor and his family being acclaimed, and "Eternal Memory!" proclaimed for each member of the Romanov Dynasty; all who deny the divine right of kings and all who "dare to stir up insurrection and rebellion against it" had been anathematized. In the Russian Orthodox Church Outside of Russia anathemas have been added against modernism and ecumenism.

== Liturgical texts ==
The liturgical texts for the Canon, Synodicon, etc., and the rubrics are found in either euchologion, Orthodox or Greek-Catholic. The theme of the day is the victory of the True Faith over heresy. "This is the victory that overcomes the world, our faith" (1 John 5:4). Also, the icons of the saints bear witness that man, "created in the image and likeness of God" (Genesis 1:26), becomes holy and godlike through the purification of himself as God's living image.

The First Sunday of Great Lent originally commemorated the Prophets such as Moses, Aaron, and Samuel. The Liturgy's Prokeimenon and alleluia verses as well as the Epistle and Gospel readings appointed for the day continue to reflect this older usage.

== Theological significance ==
The name of this Sunday reflects the great significance which icons possess for the Orthodox Church. They are not optional devotional extras, but an integral part of Orthodox faith and devotion. The debate involved important issues: the character of Christ's human nature, the Christian attitude towards matter, and the true meaning of Christian redemption. Icons are held by the Orthodox to be a necessary consequence of Christian faith in the Incarnation of the Word (John 1:14), Jesus Christ. Icons are considered by Orthodox Christians to have a sacramental character, making present to the believer the person or event depicted on them. However, the Orthodox always make a clear doctrinal distinction between the veneration (proskynesis) paid to icons and the worship (latria, adoration) which is due to God alone.
