= Second Council of Nicaea =

Ecumenical council of the Eastern Orthodox Church and the Catholic Church (787 AD)

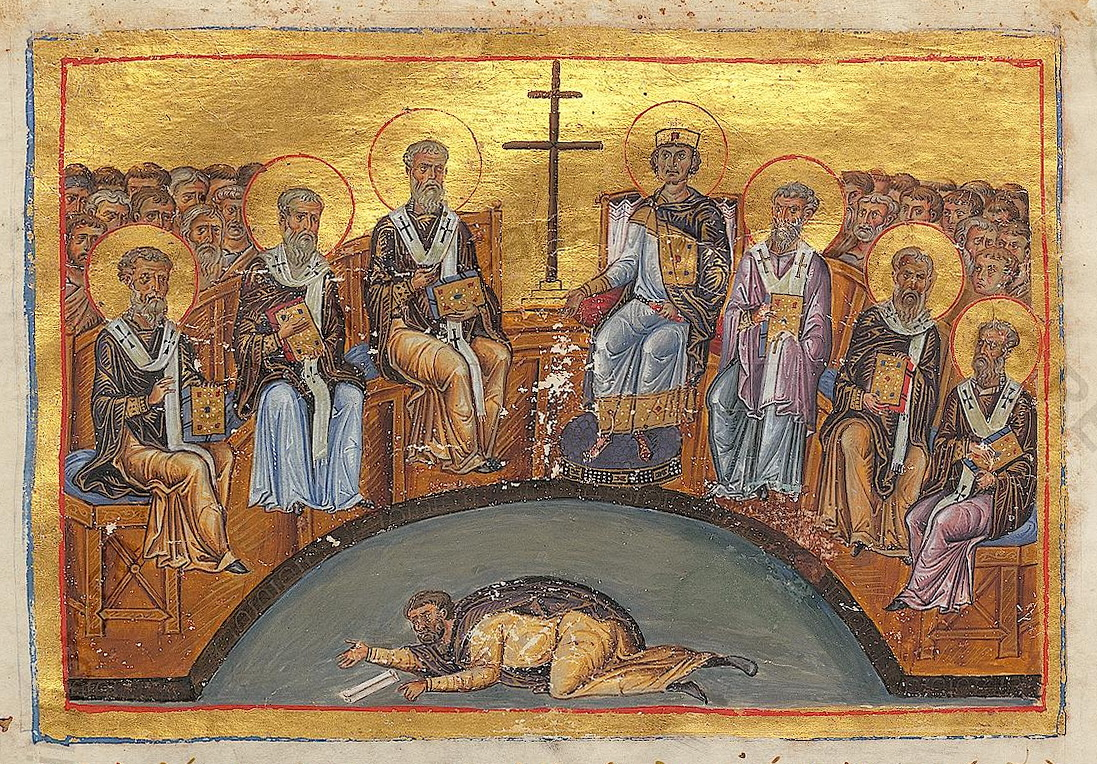
- Second Council of Nicaea, with Patriarch Tarasios (left of cross), Constantine VI (right of cross), seated bishops and a condemned iconoclast (below), Menologion of Basil II
- Date: 787
- Accepted by: Catholic Church; Eastern Orthodox Church; Old Catholic Church; Partial recognition: Oriental Orthodox Churches; Anglican church; Lutheran churches
- Previous council: Third Council of Constantinople (Catholic Church); Quinisext Council (Eastern Orthodox)
- Next council: Fourth Council of Constantinople (869) (Catholic Church); Fourth Council of Constantinople (879) (Eastern Orthodox)
- Convoked by: Emperor Constantine VI and Irene (as regent)
- President: Patriarch Tarasios of Constantinople and legates of Pope Adrian I
- Attendance: 308 bishops, 350 members total (including two papal legates)
- Topics: Iconoclasm
- Documents and statements: Veneration of icons approved

The Second Council of Nicaea is recognized as the last of the first seven ecumenical councils by the Eastern Orthodox Church and the Catholic Church. In addition, it is also recognized as such by Old Catholics and others. Protestant opinions on it are varied.

The Council assembled in 787 AD in Nicaea (site of the First Council of Nicaea; present-day İznik, Bursa, in Turkey), to restore the use and veneration of icons (or holy images), which had been suppressed by imperial edict inside the Byzantine Empire during the reign of Leo III (717–741). His son, Constantine V (741–775), had held the Council of Hieria to make the suppression official.

The Council determined that the honorary veneration (timētikē proskynēsis) of icons was permitted, and that the true adoration (alēthinē latreia) was reserved for God alone. It further stated that honor given to an icon passes through to its subject and therefore is not idolatrous as the iconoclasts believed. The iconodule position was not justified by Christological arguments as in the Council of Hieria. Rather, the antiquity of iconodulia and the Incarnation of Christ, which was said to make acceptable the depiction of Christ, were emphasized.

== Background ==
The veneration of icons had been banned by Byzantine Emperor Constantine V and supported by his Council of Hieria (754 AD), which had described itself as the seventh ecumenical council. The Council of Hieria was overturned by the Second Council of Nicaea only 33 years later, and has also been rejected by Catholic and Orthodox churches, since none of the five major patriarchs were represented. The emperor's vigorous enforcement of the ban included persecution of those who venerated icons and of monks in general. There were also political overtones to the persecution—images of emperors were still allowed by Constantine, which some opponents saw as an attempt to give wider authority to imperial power than to the saints and bishops. Constantine's iconoclastic tendencies were shared by Constantine's son, Leo IV. After the latter's early death, his widow, Irene of Athens, as regent for her son, began its restoration for personal inclination and political considerations.

On Christmas Day 784, the head of the imperial chancellery, Tarasios, was appointed successor to the iconoclast Patriarch of Constantinople, Paul IV, by Irene. Together they were attempting to solemnize the iconodule reversal of imperial policy with an ecumenical council. Pope Adrian I was invited to participate, and gladly accepted, sending two legates.

In 786, the council met in the Church of the Holy Apostles in Constantinople. However, soldiers in collusion with iconoclast bishops entered the church, and broke up the assembly. As a result, Irene resorted to a stratagem. Under the pretext of responding to an alleged Arab attack in Asia Minor, the iconoclastic bodyguard was sent away from the capital—then disarmed and disbanded. Tarasios dealt with the episcopal opposition by allowing notoriously iconoclast bishops to retain their positions so long as they made a public admission of error, and also by disguising two eastern monks as envoys of the patriarchs of Antioch and Jerusalem, to justify the council's claim to ecumenical status.

The Council was again assembled, this time in the symbolic location of Nicaea, the site of the first ecumenical council. The council opened on 24 September 787 at the Hagia Sophia. It numbered about 350 members; 308 bishops or their representatives signed. Tarasios presided, and seven sessions were held in Nicaea.

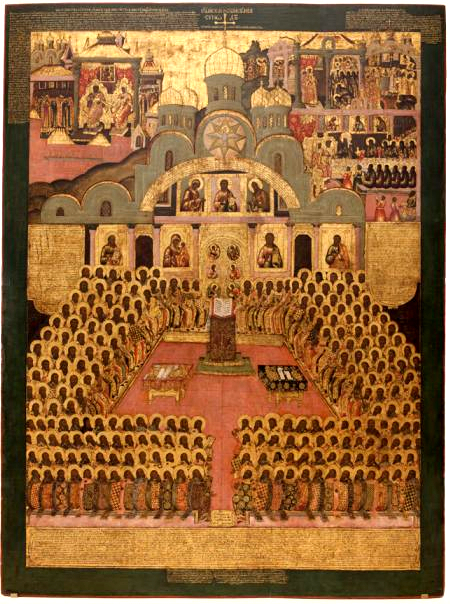
An icon of the Seventh Ecumenical Council (17th century, Novodevichy Convent, Moscow)

== Proceedings ==
- First Session (24 September 787) – There was debate over whether bishops who had accepted iconoclasm when under iconoclast rule could remain in office.
- Second Session (26 September 787) – Letters from Pope Adrian I were read out in Greek translation, approving the veneration of images, but severely critical of Byzantine infringement of papal rights. Accepting the letter at the papal legate's prompting, the bishops answered: "We follow, we receive, we admit".
- Third Session (28 September 787) – The supposed representatives of the oriental patriarchates presented their credentials. From these it is clear that their patriarchs had not in fact appointed them.
- Fourth Session (1 October 787) – Proof of the lawfulness of the veneration of icons was drawn from Exodus 25:19 sqq.; Numbers 7:89; Hebrews 9:5 sqq.; Ezekiel 41:18, and Genesis 31:43-49, but especially from a series of passages of the Church Fathers; and from hagiography.
- Fifth Session (4 October 787) – A further florilegium was read out, "proving" that iconoclasm originated from pagans, Jews, Muslims, and heretics.
- Sixth Session (7 October 787) – The definition of the pseudo-Seventh council (754) and a long refutation of the same (probably by Tarasius) were read.
- Seventh Session (13 October 787) – The council issued a declaration of faith concerning the veneration of holy images.
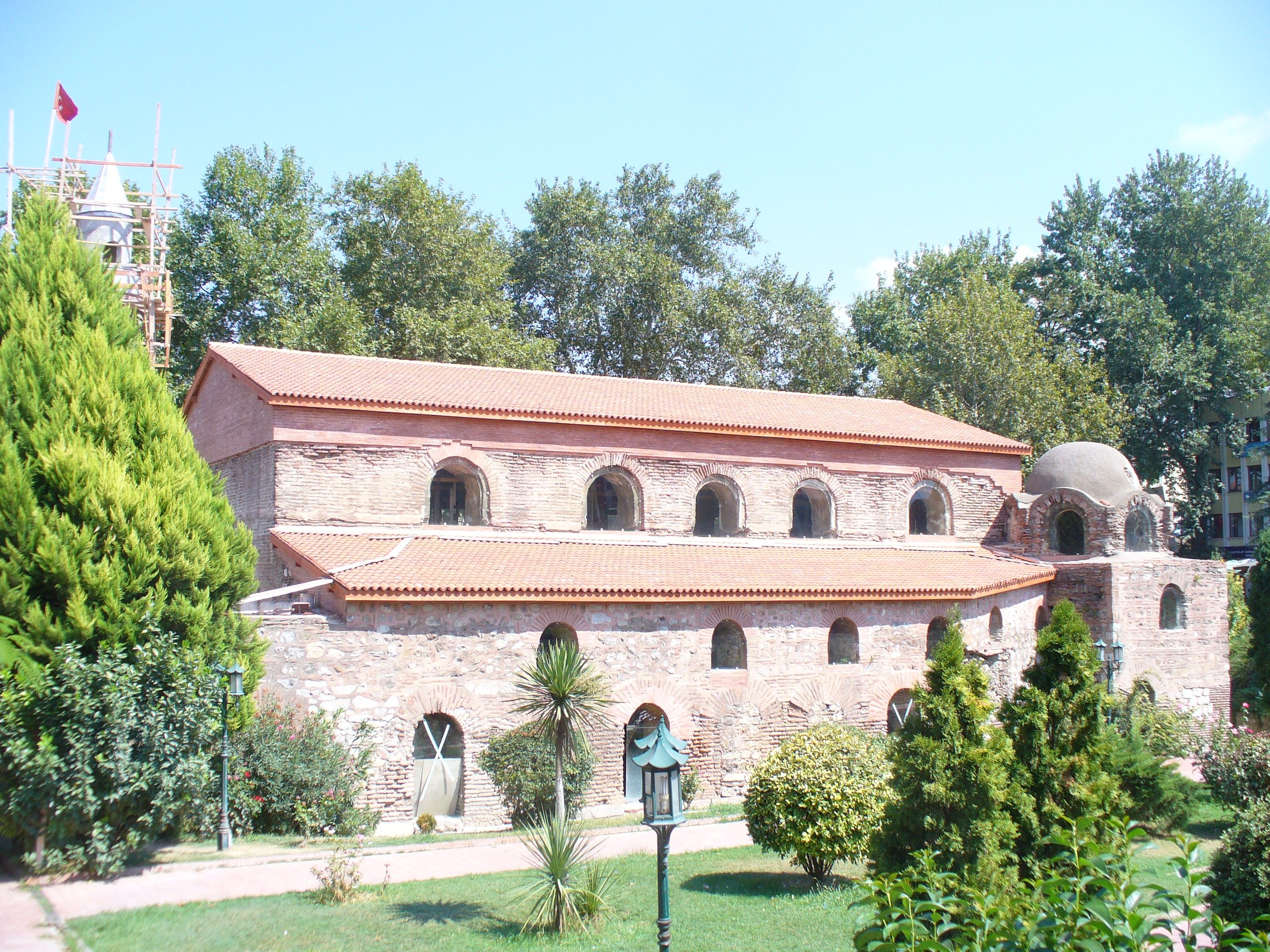
  Hagia Sophia of Nicaea, where the Council took place; Iznik, Turkey
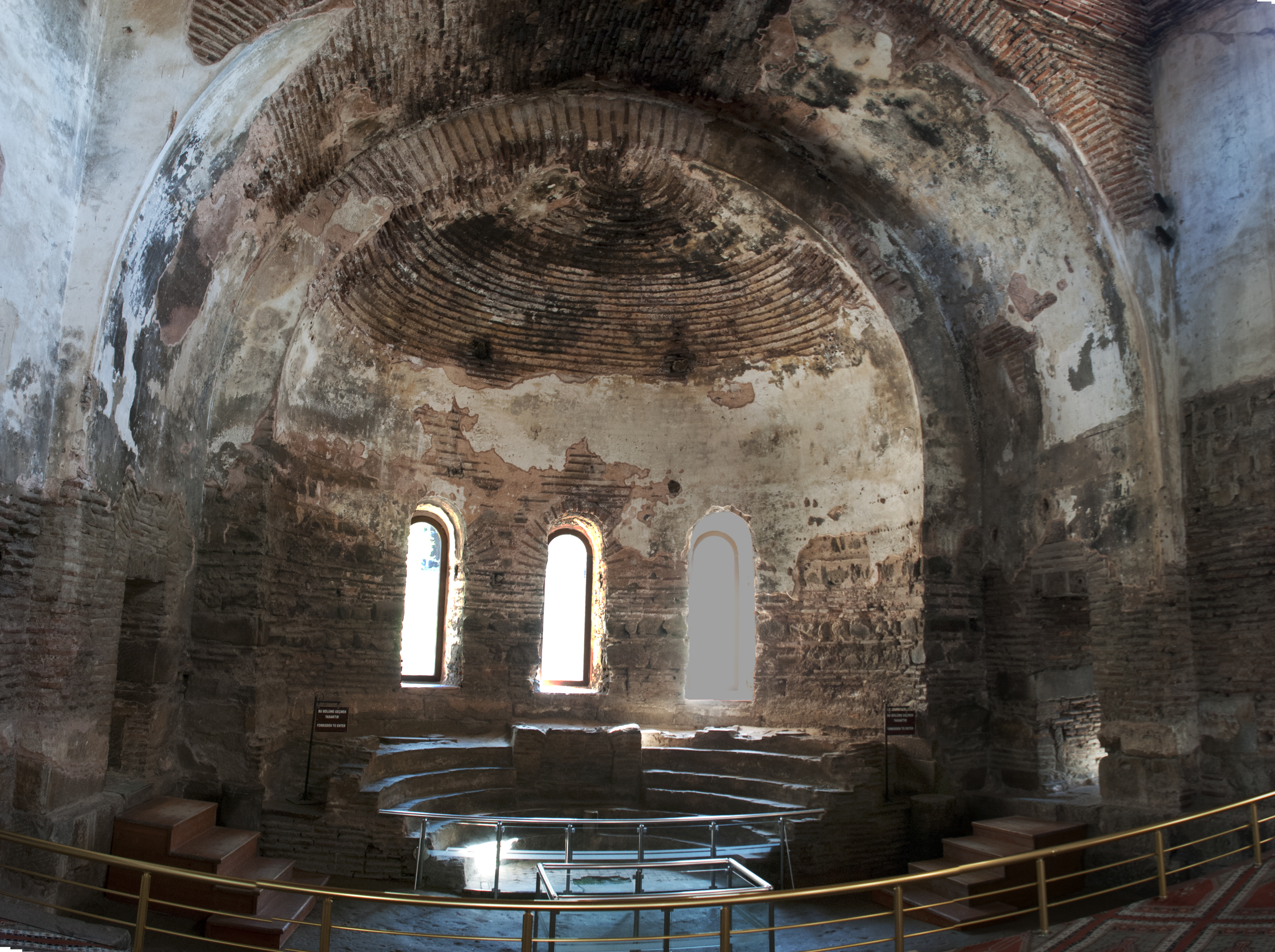
  Hagia Sophia, İznik
  It was determined that:
  As the sacred and life-giving cross is everywhere set up as a symbol, so also should the images of Jesus Christ, the Virgin Mary, the holy angels, as well as those of the saints and other pious and holy men be embodied in the manufacture of sacred vessels, tapestries, vestments, etc., and exhibited on the walls of churches, in the homes, and in all conspicuous places, by the roadside and everywhere, to be revered by all who might see them. For the more they are contemplated, the more they move to fervent memory of their prototypes. Therefore, it is proper to accord to them a fervent and reverent veneration, not, however, the veritable adoration which, according to our faith, belongs to the Divine Being alone—for the honor accorded to the image passes over to its prototype, and whoever venerate the image venerate in it the reality of what is there represented.
  This definition of the proper religious veneration of images centers on the distinction between timētikē proskynēsis, meaning the "veneration of honour", and "alēthinē latreia", meaning "true adoration". The former is permitted to images in the same way as to other holy things, notably the cross and the gospel-book, while the latter, "latreia", is reserved for God alone. But the statement that follows, to the effect that the honor paid to the image passes over to its prototype implies on the contrary that there are not two different degrees of veneration, but a single veneration that is not idolatrous since it treats the image as a door or window through which the person praying to the image perceives and adores the heavenly personage who is depicted in it. This could not lead to a worship of images of the Godhead in Byzantium, since no attempt was made to represent Godhead in art. But a problem remains over the human nature of Christ, which is certainly represented in art and which at the same time shares fully in the adoration paid to Christ as God: it would be heretical to worship Christ's Godhead but only honour his humanity.
- The so-called "Eighth Session" (23 October 787) held in Constantinople at the Magnaura Palace supposedly in the presence of the emperors Constantine IV and Irene. Erich Lamberz has proved that this "session" is a late ninth-century forgery (see Price, The Acts of the Second Council of Nicaea, 655–56). The purpose of the addition was to do justice to the role of the emperors at this ecumenical council as at its predecessors.

The twenty-two canons drawn up in Constantinople also served ecclesiastical reform. Careful maintenance of the ordinances of the earlier councils, knowledge of the scriptures on the part of the clergy, and care for Christian conduct are required, and the desire for a renewal of ecclesiastical life is awakened.

The council also decreed that every altar should contain a relic, which remains the case in modern Catholic and Orthodox regulations (Canon VII), and made a number of decrees on clerical discipline, especially for monks when mixing with women.

== Reception ==
The papal legates voiced their approval of the restoration of the veneration of icons in no uncertain terms, and the Patriarch sent a full account of the proceedings of the council to Pope Adrian I, who had it translated (Pope Anastasius III later replaced the translation with a better one). While Adrian's legates were returning from Constantinople to Rome with a copy of the Acts of the Council, the deposed Lombard king Adalgis along with a Byzantine expeditionary force were disembarking in Italy to drive out the Franks. The proceedings of the Council proclaimed the unity of the Byzantine emperor and pope on iconodulia, intentionally neglecting to mention Charlemagne, King of the Franks, which enraged the Franks who the Pope was attempting to align himself with. However, the Franks successfully repelled the Byzantine expedition, and Adrian's relations with Charlemagne were restored despite his diplomatic blunder.

The Frankish clergy initially rejected the Council at a synod in 794. Charlemagne supported the composition of the Libri Carolini, which was most likely composed in summer 793 by the influential Carolingian theologian, Theodulf of Orléans, in Saint Emmeram's Abbey, Regensburg. The main purpose of the work was to rebut the decrees of the Council, especially the "errors of the Greeks". Some modern scholars judge the Latin translation of the Acts, which Theodulf used, to be very poor: "a monument of inadequate translation. Its garbled nature gave rise to outrage among the court theologians"; it is also said to be, "bedeviled by inaccurate and in some cases intentionally incorrect translations". Other scholars, such as Thomas Noble, note that "the Carolingians themselves exhibited for some fifty or sixty years an essential familiarity with all the basic elements in discussions about sacred art." Theodulf's judgment was that Irene's aim was to "promote the superstitious adoration of images" through the council. Theodulf cited Church Fathers such as Augustine of Hippo as iconoclast witnesses. A copy was sent to Pope Adrian, who responded with a refutation of the Frankish arguments. The Libri would thereafter remain unpublished until the Reformation, and the Council was subsequently accepted as the Seventh Ecumenical Council by the Catholic Church. According to the Libri, the ruling of the council against iconoclasm led to "civil war" within the Empire, and other ninth-century iconodule sources condemn clergymen and laymen who remained iconoclasts.

The Council, or rather the final defeat of iconoclasm in 843, is celebrated in the Eastern Orthodox Church, and Eastern Catholic Churches of Byzantine Rite as "The Sunday of the Triumph of Orthodoxy" each year on the first Sunday of Great Lent, the fast that leads up to Pascha (Easter), and again on the Sunday closest to 11 October (the Sunday on or after 8 October). The former celebration commemorates the defeat of iconoclasm, while the latter commemorates the council itself. The Papacy did not formally confirm the decrees of the council until 880.

Many Protestants who follow the French reformer John Calvin generally agree in rejecting the canons of the Council, which they believe promoted idolatry. He rejected the distinction between veneration (douleia, proskynēsis) and adoration (latreia) as unbiblical "sophistry" and condemned even the decorative use of images. In subsequent editions of the Institutes, he cited the Libri Carolini.

Classical Anglicanism also rejected the decrees of the Council. The official Anglican Homily against the Peril of Idolatry in the 16th century singles it out several times as justifying idolatry: "And at the second Council Nicene, the Bishops and Clergy decreed, that images should be worshipped: and so by occasion of these stumbling blocks, not only the unlearned and simple, but the learned and wise, not the people only, but the Bishops, not the sheep, but also the shepherds themselves (who should have been guides in the right way, and light to shine in darkness) being blinded by the bewitching of images, as blind guides of the blind, fell both into the pit of damnable Idolatry." The Thirty-Nine Articles also states: "…de veneratione tum Imaginum… res est futilis, inaniter conflicta, et nullis Scripturarum testimoniis innititur; imo verbo Dei contradicit."

=== Bishops of Dalmatia ===
It is particularly interesting that four Dalmatian bishops are among the signatories of the synod, whose cities were no longer under Byzantine rule. These Dalmatian bishoprics had been dissolved earlier. So the question arises of when these bishoprics were re-established in these medieval Dalmatian cities.

The four Dalmatian bishops who signed the synod were the following, in order.

- "Ioannes episcopus sanctae ecclesiae Salonentianae" (John of Salona-Split)
- "Laurentius episcopus sanctae Absartianensis ecclesiae" (Lawrence of Osor)
- "Ursus episcopus Avaritianensium ecclesiae" (Ursus of Rab)
- "Ioannes episcopus Decateron" (John of Kotor)

This suggests that new bishoprics was founded or old (Early Christian) episcopal seats were re-established in this area. The founding of these bishoprics is attested by the 8th century Chronicon Gradense. The chronicle reports the foundation of several Dalmatian bishoprics, such as the bishopric of Rab as "Avoriciensis/Avonciensis ecclesia", the foundation of the bishopric of Krk as "episcopatus in Vegla", the foundation of the bishopric of Osor as "episcopatus in Asparo", and the bishopric of Pićan as "episcopus Pathensis". As the chronicle reports a Dalmatian provincial synod held in the city of Grado.

== Critical edition of the Greek text ==
- Concilium universale Nicaenum Secundum, in Acta Conciliorum Oecumenicorum, ser. 2, vol. 3, in 3 parts, ed. Erich Lamberz, Berlin 2008–2016. Also includes the Latin translation by Anastasius Bibliothecarius.

== Translations ==
There are only a few translations of the above Acts in the modern languages.

- English translation made in 1850 by an Anglican priest, John Mendham; with notes taken largely from the attack on the council in the Libri Carolini. The aim of the translation was to show how the Catholic veneration of images is based on superstition and forgery.
- The Canons and excerpts of the Acts in The Seven Ecumenical Councils of the Undivided Church, translated by Henry Robert Percival and edited by Philip Schaff (1901).
- Translation made by Kazan Theological Academy (published from 1873 to 1909) – a seriously corrupted translation of the Acts of the Councils into Russian.
- Polish translation of Ecumenical councils, by Teresa Wnętrzak, Arkadiusz Baron and Henryk Pietras, vol. 1 (2001), Wydawnictwo WAM, ISBN 8370979289.
- A relatively new Vatican's translation (2004) into Italian language. Publishers in Vatican mistakenly thought that they made the first translation of the Acts into European languages.
- The new (2016) Russian version of the Acts of the Council is a revised version of the translation made by Kazan Theological Academy, specifying the cases of corruption by the Orthodox translators. There are several dozens of such cases, some of them are critical.
- Price, Richard, ed. (2018a). The acts of the Second Council of Nicaea (787). Vol. 1. Liverpool: Liverpool University Press. ISBN 9781802071023.
- Price, Richard, ed. (2018b). The acts of the Second Council of Nicaea (787). Vol. 2. Liverpool: Liverpool University Press. ISBN 9781786941275.

== See also ==
- Plato of Sakkoudion
- Sabas of Stoudios
- Fourth Council of Constantinople (Eastern Orthodox)
- Proskynēsis – Expression of respect
