= Iconodulism =

Religious service to icons

Iconodulism (also iconoduly or iconodulia) designates the religious service to icons (kissing and honourable veneration, incense, and candlelight). The term comes from Neoclassical Greek εἰκονόδουλος (eikonodoulos) (from Greek: εἰκόνα – icon (image) + Greek: δοῦλος – servant), meaning "one who serves images (icons)". It is also referred to as iconophilism (also iconophily or iconophilia from Greek: εἰκόνα – icon (image) + Greek: φιλέω – love) designating a positive attitude towards the religious use of icons. In the history of Christianity, iconodulism (or iconophilism) was manifested as a moderate position, between two extremes: iconoclasm (radical opposition to the use of icons) and iconolatry (idolatric veritable (full) adoration of icons).

== History ==
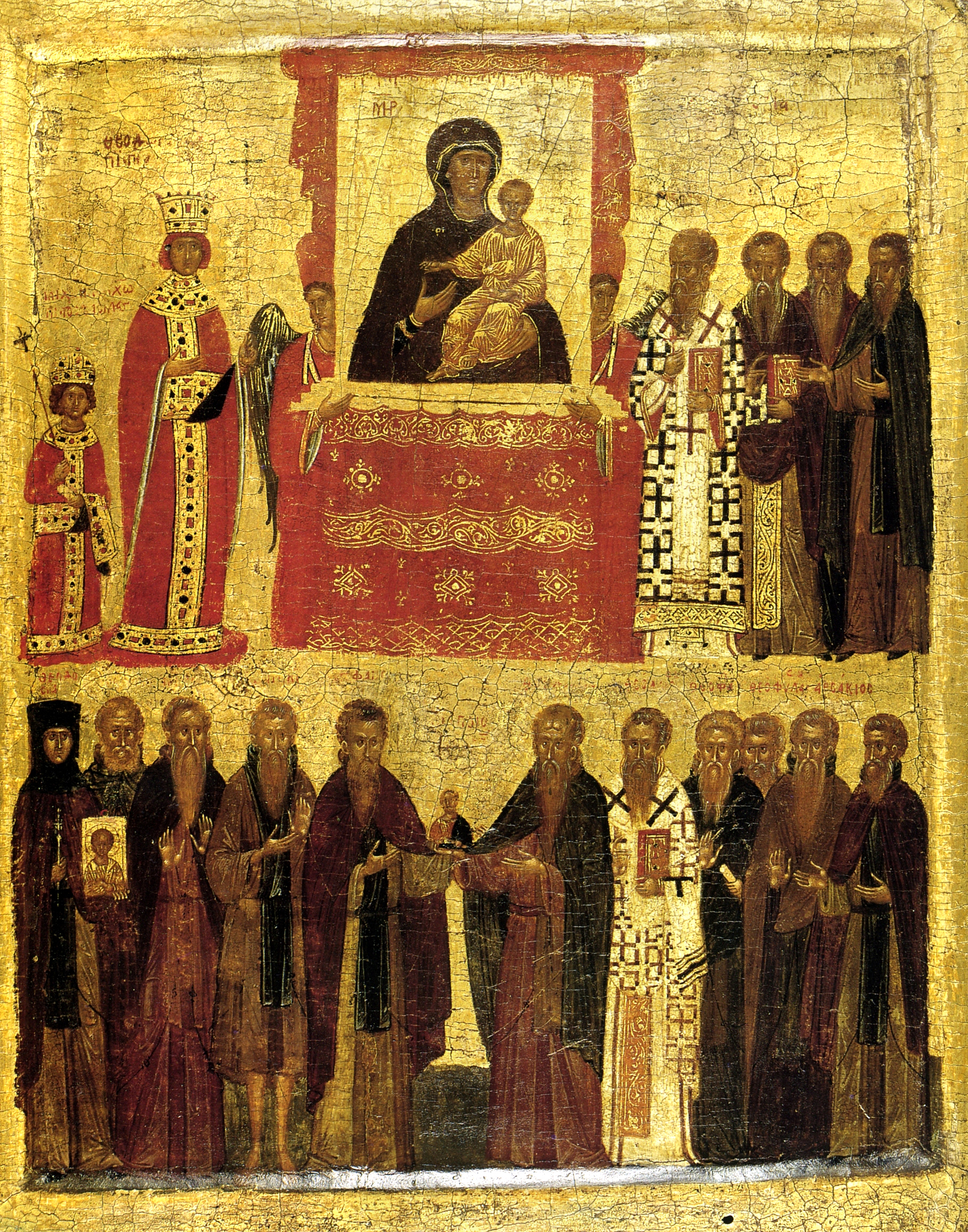
Late 14th-early 15th century icon illustrating the "Triumph of Orthodoxy" under the Byzantine empress Theodora over iconoclasm in 843. (National Icon Collection 18, British Museum).

In contrast to moderate or respectful adoration, various forms of latria of icons (iconolatry) were also starting to appear, mainly in popular worship. Since veritable (full) adoration was reserved for God alone, such an attitude towards icons as objects was seen as a form of idolatry. In reaction to that, the idolatrous misuse of icons was criticized and by the beginning of the 8th century some radical forms of criticism (iconoclasm) were also starting to emerge, arguing not only against adoration of icons, but also against any form of adoration and use of icons in religious life.

The iconoclastic controversy emerged in the Byzantine Empire and lasted through the 8th and the 9th centuries. The most famous iconodules (proponents of the veneration of icons) during that time were saints John of Damascus and Theodore the Studite. The controversy was instigated by the Byzantine Emperor Leo III in 726, when he ordered the removal of the image of Christ above the Chalke Gate of the imperial palace in Constantinople. A wider prohibition of icons followed in 730. St. John of Damascus argued successfully that to prohibit the use of icons was tantamount to denying the incarnation, the presence of the Word of God in the material world. Icons reminded the church of the physicality of God as manifested in Jesus Christ.

Kissing and respected worship (Greek: «ἀσπασμόν καί τιμητικήν προσκύνησιν»; Latin: «osculum et honorariam adorationem»), incense and candles for icons was established by the Second Council of Nicaea (Seventh Ecumenical Council) in 787. The Council decided that icons should not be destroyed, as was advocated and practiced by the iconoclasts, nor veritable (full) worshiped or adored (Greek: «ἀληθινήν λατρείαν»; Latin: «veram latriam»), as was practiced by iconolatrists, but they needed to be kissed and they needed respectful worship as symbolic representations of God, angels or saints. Such a position was approved by Pope Adrian I, but due to mis-translations of conciliar acts from Greek into Latin, a controversy arose in the Frankish kingdom, resulting in the creation of Libri Carolini. The last outburst of iconoclasm in the Byzantine Empire was overcome at the Council of Constantinople (843), which reaffirmed the adoration of icons in an event celebrated as the Feast of Orthodoxy.

The Council of Trent (XIX Ecumenical Council of the Catholic Church) in 1563 confirmed iconodulism. But this council, unlike the Council of Nicaea, used a different expression in relation to icons: "honour and veneration" (Latin: honorem et venerationem). Its decree reads: "we kiss, and before which we uncover the head, and prostrate ourselves, we adore Christ; and we venerate the saints, whose similitude they bear" (Latin: ita ut per imagines, quas osculamur, et coram quibus caput aperimus, et procumbimus, Christum adoremus, et Sanctos quorum illae similitudinem gerunt, veneremur).

== See also ==
- Byzantine iconoclasm
- Iconoclasm
- Iconography
- Idolatry
- Iconolatry
- Council of Constantinople (843)

== Sources ==
- Meyendorff, John (1989). Imperial unity and Christian divisions: The Church 450–680 A.D. The Church in history. Vol. 2. Crestwood, NY: St. Vladimir's Seminary Press. ISBN 9780881410563.
- Ostrogorsky, George (1956). History of the Byzantine State. Oxford: Basil Blackwell.
- Barnard, Leslie William (1974). The Graeco-Roman and oriental background of the iconoclastic controversy. Vol. 5. Brill. ISBN 90-04-03944-9.
- Mendham, John (1850). The Seventh General Council, the Second of Nicaea, Held A.D. 787, in which the Worship of Images was Established: With Copious Notes from the "Caroline Books", Compiled by Order of Charlemagne for Its Confutation. London: W.E. Painter.
