= Council of Constantinople (867) =

Church Council

The Council of Constantinople of 867 was a major Church Council, convened by Emperor Michael III of Byzantium and Patriarch Photios I of Constantinople in order to address several ecclesiastical issues, including the question of Papal supremacy in the Church, and the use of Filioque clause in the Creed.

== Context ==
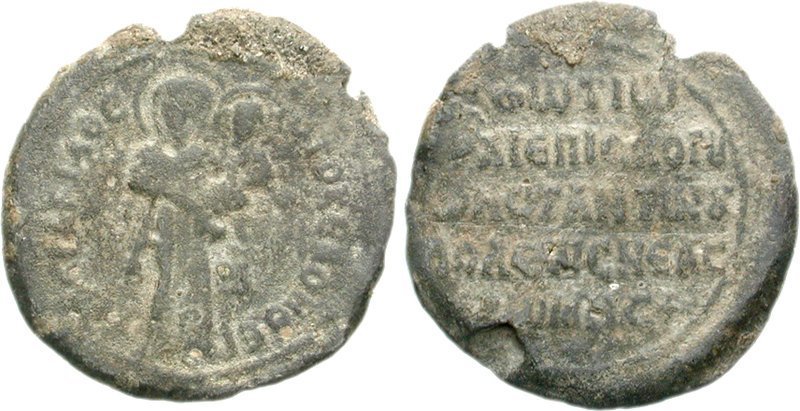
Seal of Patriarch Photios of Constantinople

At least five councils (in 859, 861, 867, 869-870, and 879-880) were held in Constantinople over the deposition of Patriarch Ignatius of Constantinople by Emperor Michael III and his replacement by Photios. The Pope in disagreement held a synod at the Lateran in 863 that reversed the decision of the Eastern Churches and the Emperor; this was taken by the East as an unacceptable intervention by the Pope of Rome. Pope Nicholas I had attempted to remove Photios and reappoint Ignatius as the Patriarch of Constantinople by his own authority and decree. Thus, the Pope was intervening in matters of Imperial authority as well as in the other churches of the East and their own internal councils and authorities, which they understood to be outside the Pope's own jurisdiction of Rome (and perhaps the rest of the West; at the time of these councils there were no other Patriarchs in the West other than Rome, whereas there were four Patriarchs of the East).

The Council at Constantinople in 867 excommunicated Pope Nicholas I and declared him anathema. In addition, Roman claims of papal primacy, his contacts with Bulgaria, and the Filioque clause were condemned. Pope Nicholas I subsequently died and was replaced by Pope Adrian II.

== Aftermath ==
The Council of 867 was followed by another Council of Constantinople, held in 869-870, receiving papal support and abolishing the Council of 867. Several years later, new Council of Constantinople was held in 879-880, restoring the conclusions of the Council of 867. The Roman Catholic Church rejects the councils of 867 and 879-880 but accepts the council of 869-870; the reverse is true of the Eastern Orthodox Church.

== See also ==
- History of the Filioque controversy
- Schism of 863

== Bibliography ==
- Cross, Frank L.; Livingstone, Elizabeth A., eds. (2005) [1957]. The Oxford Dictionary of the Christian Church (3rd rev. ed.). New York: Oxford University Press. ISBN 9780192802903.
- Dvornik, Francis (1948). The Photian Schism: History and Legend. Cambridge, UK: Cambridge University Press.
- Fortescue, Adrian (1907). The Orthodox Eastern Church. London: Catholic Truth Society.
- Louth, Andrew (2007). Greek East and Latin West: The Church AD 681–1071. Crestwood, N.Y.: St Vladimir’s Seminary Press. ISBN 9780881413205.
- Ostrogorsky, George (1956). History of the Byzantine State. Oxford: Basil Blackwell.
- Siecienski, Anthony Edward (2010). The Filioque: History of a Doctrinal Controversy. Oxford University Press. ISBN 9780195372045.
- Tougher, Shaun (1997). The Reign of Leo VI (886-912): Politics and People. Leiden; New York; Köln: Brill. ISBN 9004108114.
