= Fourth Council of Constantinople =

Fourth Council of Constantinople (also Eighth Ecumenical Council) may refer to:

- Fourth Council of Constantinople (Catholic Church) that took place in 869–870
- Fourth Council of Constantinople (Eastern Orthodox) that took place in 879–880
