= History of the filioque controversy =

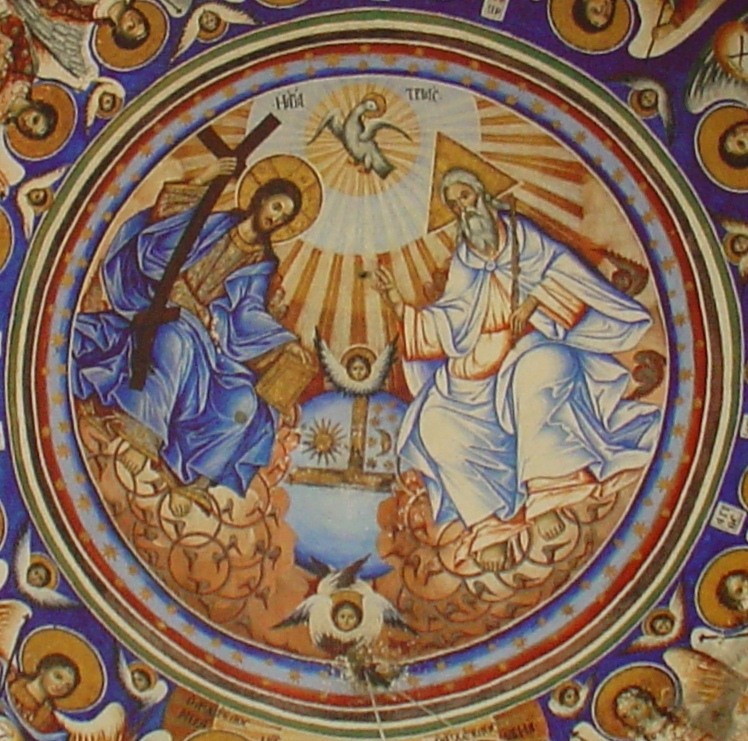
Icon of the Holy Trinity in the Vatopedi Monastery at Mount Athos, Greece

The history of the filioque controversy is the historical development of theological controversies within Christianity regarding three distinctive issues: the orthodoxy of the doctrine of procession of the Holy Spirit as represented by the Filioque clause, the nature of anathemas mutually imposed by conflicted sides during the Filioque controversy, and the liceity (legitimacy) of the insertion of the Filioque phrase into the Nicene Creed. Although the debates over the orthodoxy of the doctrine of procession and the nature of related anathemas preceded the question of the admissibility of the phrase as inserted into the Creed, all of those issues became linked when the insertion received the approval of the Pope in the eleventh century.

== Nicene Creed ==
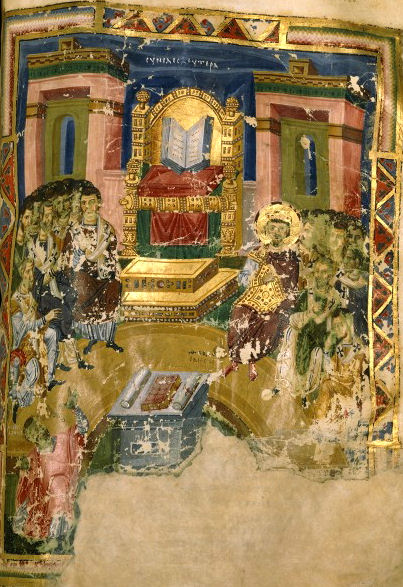
First Council of Constantinople, miniature in Homilies of Gregory Nazianzus (879–882), Bibliothèque nationale de France

The first ecumenical council, that of Nicaea (modern day İznik Province, Turkey) [325] ended its Creed with the words "and [sc. I believe] in the Holy Spirit". The second, that of Constantinople in 381 spoke of the Holy Spirit as "proceeding from the Father" (ἐκ τοῦ Πατρὸς ἐκπορευόμενον). This last phrase is based on John 15:26 (ὃ παρὰ τοῦ πατρὸς ἐκπορεύεται).

The third ecumenical council, held at Ephesus in 431, which quoted the creed in its 325 form, not in that of 381, decreed in its seventh canon:

"It is unlawful for any man to bring forward, or to write, or to compose a different (ἑτέραν) Faith as a rival to that established by the holy Fathers assembled with the Holy Ghost in Nicæa. But those who shall dare to compose a different faith, or to introduce or offer it to persons desiring to turn to the acknowledgment of the truth, whether from Heathenism or from Judaism, or from any heresy whatsoever, shall be deposed, if they be bishops or clergymen; bishops from the episcopate and clergymen from the clergy; and if they be laymen, they shall be anathematized".

While the Council of Ephesus thus forbade setting up a different creed as a rival to that of the first ecumenical council, it was the creed of the second ecumenical council that was adopted liturgically in the East and later a Latin variant was adopted in the West. The form of this creed that the West adopted had two additions: "God from God" (Deum de Deo) and "and the Son" (Filioque). (Note: The two texts, Greek and Latin, are given in Nicene Creed#Ancient liturgical versions.)

== Possible earliest use in the Creed ==
Recent discoveries have shown that the earliest known introduction of "and the Son" into the Nicene Creed may have been the work of a local council in the east, the Council of Seleucia-Ctesiphon in Persia in about 410. This was some twenty years before the Nestorian Schism divided the Church in Persia from the Church in the Roman Empire; the Church in Persia after the schism became known as the Church of the East.

== New Testament ==
In John 15:26 Jesus says of the Holy Spirit: "But when the Helper comes, whom I will send to you from the Father, the Spirit of truth, who proceeds from the Father, he will bear witness about me." In John 16:13–15 Jesus also says of the Holy Spirit "he will take what is mine and declare it to you", and it is argued that in the relations between the Persons of the Trinity one Person cannot "take" or "receive" (λήψεται) anything from either of the others except by way of procession. Texts such as John 20:22 ("He breathed on them and said: Receive the Holy Spirit"), were seen by Fathers of the Church, especially Athanasius, Cyril of Alexandria and Epiphanius of Cyprus as grounds for saying that the Spirit "proceeds substantially from both" the Father and the Son. Other texts that have been used include Galatians 4:6, Romans 8:9, Philippians 1:19, where the Holy Spirit is called "the Spirit of the Son", "the Spirit of Christ", "the Spirit of Jesus Christ", and texts in the Gospel of John on the sending of the Holy Spirit by Jesus (14:16, 15:26,16:7).

Anthony E. Siecienski asserts that it is important to recognize that "the New Testament does not explicitly address the procession of the Holy Spirit as later theology would understand the doctrine." However, he asserts that there are, nonetheless "certain principles established in the New Testament that shaped later Latin Trinitarian theology, and particular texts that both Latins and Greeks exploited to support their respective positions vis-à-vis the filioque." The Orthodox believe that the absence of an explicit mention of the double procession of the Holy Spirit is a strong indication that the filioque is a theologically erroneous doctrine.

== Church Fathers ==
Before the creed of 381 became known in the West and even before it was adopted by the First Council of Constantinople, Christian writers in the West, of whom Tertullian (c. 160 – c. 220), Jerome (347–420), Ambrose (c. 338 – 397) and Augustine (354–430) are representatives, spoke of the Spirit as coming from the Father and the Son, while the expression “from the Father through the Son” is also found among them.

Tertullian, writing at the beginning of the third century, emphasizes that Father, Son and Holy Spirit all share a single divine substance, quality and power, which he conceives of as flowing forth from the Father and being transmitted by the Son to the Spirit.

Hilary of Poitiers, in the mid-fourth century, speaks of the Spirit as "coming forth from the Father" and being "sent by the Son" (De Trinitate 12.55); as being "from the Father through the Son" (ibid. 12.56); and as "having the Father and the Son as his source" (ibid. 2.29); in another passage, Hilary points to John 16.15 (where Jesus says: 'All things that the Father has are mine; therefore I said that [the Spirit] shall take from what is mine and declare it to you'), and wonders aloud whether "to receive from the Son is the same thing as to proceed from the Father" (ibid. 8.20).

Ambrose of Milan, writing in the 380s, openly asserts that the Spirit "proceeds from (procedit a) the Father and the Son", without ever being separated from either (On the Holy Spirit 1.11.20).

None of these writers, however, makes the Spirit's mode of origin the object of special reflection; all are concerned, rather, to emphasize the equality of status of all three divine persons as God, and all acknowledge that the Father alone is the source of God's eternal being.

=== Procession of the Holy Spirit ===
Already in the fourth century the distinction was made, in connection with the Trinity, between the two Greek verbs ἐκπορεύεσθαι (the verb used in the original Greek text of the 381 Nicene Creed) and προϊέναι. In his Oration on the Holy Lights (XXXIX), Saint Gregory of Nazianzus wrote: "The Holy Ghost is truly Spirit, coming forth (προϊέναι) from the Father indeed, but not after the manner of the Son, for it is not by Generation but by Procession (ἐκπορεύεσθαι)".

That the Holy Spirit "proceeds" from the Father and the Son in the sense of the Latin word procedere and the Greek προϊέναι (as opposed to the Greek ἐκπορεύεσθαι) was taught by the early fifth century by Saint Cyril of Alexandria in the East, the Athanasian Creed (probably of the middle of the fifth century), and a dogmatic epistle of Pope Leo I, (Note: "The Holy Ghost is from the Father and the Son, neither made, nor created, nor begotten, but proceeding". In the original Latin:"Spiritus Sanctus a Patre et Filio: non factus, nec creatus, nec genitus, sed procedens".) who declared in 446 that the Holy Spirit proceeds from both Father and Son.

Although the Eastern Fathers were aware that in the West the procession of the Holy Spirit from the Father and the Son was taught, they did not generally regard it as heretical: "a whole series of Western writers, including popes who are venerated as saints by the Eastern church, confess the procession of the Holy Spirit also from the Son; and it is even more striking that there is virtually no disagreement with this theory."

The phrase Filioque first appears as an anti-Arian interpolation in the Creed at the Third Council of Toledo (589), at which Visigothic Spain renounced Arianism, accepting Catholic Christianity. The addition was confirmed by subsequent local councils in Toledo and soon spread throughout the West, not only in Spain, but also in the kingdom of the Franks, who had adopted the Catholic faith in 496, and in England, where the Council of Hatfield imposed it in 680 as a response to Monothelitism. However, it was not adopted in Rome.

A number of Church Fathers of the 4th and 5th centuries explicitly speak of the Holy Spirit as proceeding "from the Father and the Son". They include Hilary of Poitiers (c. 300 – c. 368), (Note: Saint Hilary wrote: "Concerning the Holy Spirit I ought not to be silent, and yet I have no need to speak; still, for the sake of those who are in ignorance, I cannot refrain. There is no need to speak, because we are bound to confess Him, proceeding, as He does, from Father and Son." This English translation of De Trinitate2:29 is cited in Swete 2011 The passage is cited in various other sources. He also said that the Holy Spirit "receives from both the Father and the Son") Ephrem the Syrian (c. 306 – 373), (Note: Saint Ephrem declared: "The Father is the Begetter, the Son the Begotten from the bosom of the Father, the Holy Spirit He that proceedeth from the Father and the Son" The text given in Price, 2001 has a misprint: "The Father is the Begotten", in place of "The Father is the Begetter". It is cited also in) (Note: Cyril of Alexandria could argue (against the Nestorians) that the Spirit proceeds from the Father and the Son. In fact, Greek fathers from Epiphanius to as late as Cyril of Alexandria referred to the Spirit's procession from the Father and the Son (citing Barth, Church Dogmatics, vol. I, pt. 1, 477, referring to Epiphanius, Ephraim and Cyril of Alexandria).") Epiphanius of Salamis(c. 310–320 – 403), (Note: Saint Epiphanius of Salamis wrote: "Christ is believed to be from the Father, God from God, and the Spirit from Christ, from both" (Χριστὸς ἐκ τοῦ Πατρὸς πιστεύεται Θεὸς ἐκ τοῦ Θεοῦ, καὶ τὸ Πνεῦμα ἐκ τοῦ Χριστοῦ, ἢ παρ’ ἀμφοτέρων –Ancoratus 67 in PG 43 137B). This is quoted also by Gerald Bray, Epiphanius also stated: "The Spirit breathes from Father and Son" (τὸ Πνεῦμα ἐκ Πατρὸς καὶ Υἱοῦ πνέει – Ancoratus 75 in PG 43 157A); "The Spirit is God from Father and Son" (Ἄρα Θεὸς ἐκ Πατρὸς καὶ Υἱοῦ τὸ Πνεῦμα – Ancoratus 9 in PG 32C). "Epiphanius could say that the Holy Spirit proceeds from both the Father and the Son" He used the same phrase, "from Father and Son", also in hisPanarion 62, and a similar phrase in his Ancoratus 73, both of which are quoted by Bray.) Ambrose (337–340 – 397), (Note: Saint Ambrose stated: "When the Holy Spirit proceeds from the Father and the Son, He is not separated from the Father, He is not separated from the Son" (Spiritus quoque sanctus cum procedit a Patre et Filio, non separatur a Patre, non separatur a Filio – PL 16:733A) Augustine of Hippo (354 – 430), (Note: Saint Augustine wrote: "God the Father alone is He from whom the Word is born, and from whom the Holy Spirit principally proceeds. And therefore I have added the word 'principally', because we find that the Holy Spirit proceeds from the Son also. But the Father gave Him this too, not as to one already existing, and not yet having it; but whatever He gave to the only-begotten Word, He gave by begetting Him. Therefore He so begat Him as that the common Gift should proceed from Him also, and the Holy Spirit should be the Spirit of both") Cyril of Alexandria (c. 376–444), (Note: Saint Cyril of Alexandria declared: "The Spirit proceeds (πρόεισι) from the Father and the Son; clearly, he is of the divine substance (οὐσίας), proceeding (προϊόν) substantially in it and from it" (Πρόεισι δὲ καὶ ἐκ Πατρὸς καὶ Υἱοῦ. πρόδηλον ὅτι τῆς θείας ἐστιν οὐσίας, οὐσιωδῶς ἐν αὐτῇ καὶ ἐξ αὐτῆς προϊόν) in Thesaurus, PG 75, 585A). Cyril made similar statements also in other passages: "Cyril In Ev. Joh. 2, p. 126 (PG 74.443B); De adoratione in spiritu et veritate 1 (PG 68.148A), The ninth of his anathemas against Nestorius states that "it was by his own proper Spirit through whom (Jesus) worked the divine wonders") and Pope Leo I (c. 400–461). (Note: Saint Leo the Great dogmatically condemned denial of the distinction between the Father, "who begot", the Son, "who is begotten", and the Holy Spirit, "who proceeds from both".) In the 7th century, Saint Maximus the Confessor (c. 580 – 662) declared it wrong to make accusations against the Romans for saying that the Holy Spirit proceeds also from the Son, since the Romans were able to cite the unanimous support of the Latin Fathers and a statement by Saint Cyril of Alexandria. (Note: Saint Maximus the Confessor wrote that the Romans "have produced the unanimous evidence of the Latin Fathers, and also of Cyril of Alexandria, from the study he made of the gospel of St John. On the basis of these texts, they have shown that they have not made the Son the cause of the Spirit – they know in fact that the Father is the only cause of the Son and the Spirit, the one by begetting and the other by procession") Apart from those already mentioned, these Latin Fathers included Saints Faustus of Riez (died between 490 and 495), Gennadius of Massilia (died c. 496), Avitus of Vienne (c. 470 – 523), Fulgentius of Ruspe (462 or 467 – 527 or 533), and Isidore of Seville (died 636).

=== "From the Father through the Son" ===
Church Fathers also use the phrase "from the Father through the Son". (Note: For instance, Tertullian ("I believe that the Spirit proceeds not otherwise than from the Father through the Son" – Against Praxeas 4:1) and John of Damascus ("The Holy Spirit is the power of the Father revealing the hidden mysteries of His Divinity, proceeding from the Father through the Son")) The Roman Catholic Church accepts both phrases, and considers that they do not affect the reality of the same faith and instead express the same truth in slightly different ways. The influence of Augustine of Hippo made the phrase "proceeds from the Father through the Son" popular throughout the West but, while used also in the East, "through the Son" was later, according to Philip Schaff, dropped or rejected by some as being nearly equivalent to "from the Son" or "and the Son". Others spoke of the Holy Spirit proceeding "from the Father", as in the text of the Nicaeno-Constantinopolitan Creed, which "did not state that the Spirit proceeds from the Father alone".

=== Hilary of Poitiers ===
Hilary of Poitiers is one of "the chief patristic source(s) for the Latin teaching on the filioque." However, Siecienski notes that "there is also reason for questioning Hilary's support for the filioque as later theology would understand it, especially given the ambiguous nature of (Hilary's) language as it concerns the procession."

=== Ambrose of Milan ===
Ambrose of Milan, though "firmly rooted in Eastern tradition", was nonetheless "one of the earliest witnesses to the explicit affirmation of the Spirit's procession from the Father and the Son".

=== Jerome ===
Siecienski characterizes Jerome's views on the procession of the Holy Spirit as "defying categorization". His name is often included in Latin florilegia as a supporter of the filioque and Photius even felt called to defend Jerome's reputation against those who invoked him in support of the doctrine. However, because Jerome's writing contains scant references to the doctrine and even those are "far from ambiguous affirmations of a double procession", Orthodox theologians such as John Meyendorff have argued that he "could hardly be regarded a proponent of the filioque".

=== Augustine of Hippo ===
Augustine's writings on the Trinity became the foundation of Latin trinitarian theology and serves as the foundation for the doctrine of the filioque.

=== Pope Leo I ===
Siecienski characterizes the writings of Pope Leo I on the subject of the procession of the Holy Spirit as a "sword that cuts both ways" in that "his writings would later be used by both Latins and Greeks to support their respective positions."

=== Pope Gregory the Great ===
Pope Gregory the Great is usually counted as a supporter of the Spirit's procession from the Father and the Son, despite the fact that Photius and later Byzantine theologians counted him as an opponent of the doctrine. Siecienski attributes this apparent contradiction to two factors: Gregory's "loose and unguarded language" regarding the procession and differences between the original Latin text of Gregory's Dialogues and Pope Zacharias' Greek translation of them. Gregory's text, in Latin, clearly affirmed the Filioque, but Zacharias' translation into Greek used the phrase "abiding in the Son" rather than "proceeding from the Son", thus leading later Byzantine clerics to assert that Gregory did not support double procession. In Homily 26 of his Homilies on the Gospels, Gregory teaches the Filioque equating the Holy Spirit's being sent by the Son from the Father with the Holy Spirit's proceeding from the Father and the Son. In the Moralia in Job teaches the doctrine in several passages.

== First Eastern opposition ==
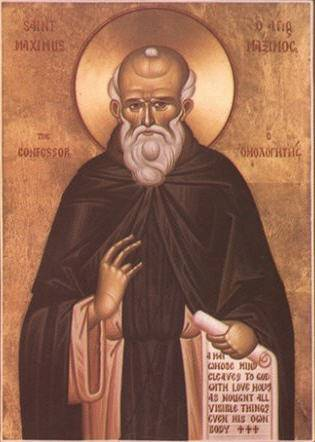
Saint Maximus the Confessor

In 638, the Byzantine emperor Heraclius, with the support of or at the instigation of Patriarch Sergius I of Constantinople, published the Ecthesis, which defined as the official imperial form of Christianity Monothelitism, the doctrine that, while Christ possessed two natures, he had only a single will. This was widely accepted in the East, but before the Ecthesis reached Rome, Pope Honorius I, who had seemed to support Monothelitism, died, and his successor Pope Severinus condemned the Ecthesis outright, and so was forbidden his seat until 640. His successor Pope John IV also rejected the doctrine completely, leading to a major schism between the eastern and western halves of the Chalcedonian Church.

Meanwhile, in Africa, an Eastern monk named Maximus the Confessor carried on a furious campaign against Monothelitism, and in 646 he convinced the African councils to draw up a manifesto against the doctrine. This they forwarded to the new pope Theodore I, who in turn wrote to Patriarch Paul II of Constantinople, outlining the heretical nature of the doctrine. Paul, a devoted Monothelite, replied in a letter directing the Pope to adhere to the doctrine of one will. Theodore in turn excommunicated the Patriarch in 649, declaring him a heretic, after Paul, in 647 or 648, had issued in the name of Emperor Constans II an edict known as the Typos, which banned any mention of either one or two activities or wills in Christ. The Typos, instead of defusing the situation, made it worse by implying that either doctrine was as good as the other. Theodore planned the Lateran Council of 649 but died before he could convene it, which his successor, Pope Martin I, did. The Council condemned the Ecthesis and the Typos, and Pope Martin wrote to Constans, informing the emperor of its conclusions and requiring him to condemn both the Monothelite doctrine and his own Typos. Constans responded by having Pope Martin abducted to Constantinople, where he was tried and condemned to banishment and died as a result of the torture to which he had been subjected. Maximus also was tried and banished after having his tongue and his hand cut off.

Maximus the Confessor (c. 580 – 13 August 662) wrote a letter in defence of the expression used by the Pope Marinus. The words with which Maximus the Confessor declared that it was wrong to condemn the Roman use of Filioque are as follows:

"They [the Romans] have produced the unanimous evidence of the Latin Fathers, and also of Cyril of Alexandria, from the study he made of the gospel of St John. On the basis of these texts, they have shown that they have not made the Son the cause of the Spirit – they know in fact that the Father is the only cause of the Son and the Spirit, the one by begetting and the other by procession –but that they have manifested the procession through him and have thus shown the unity and identity of the essence. They [the Romans] have therefore been accused of precisely those things of which it would be wrong to accuse them, whereas the former [the Byzantines] have been accused of those things it has been quite correct to accuse them [Monothelitism]."

== Later developments ==
Widespread use of the Filioque in the West led to controversy with envoys of the Byzantine Emperor Constantine V at the Synod of Gentilly held at Gentilly in 767. The use of Filioque was defended by Saint Paulinus II, the Patriarch of Aquileia, at the Synod of Friuli, Italy in 796, and it was endorsed in 809 at the local Council of Aachen.

As the practice of chanting the Latin Credo at Mass spread in the West, the Filioque became a part of the Latin liturgical rites. This practice was adopted in Emperor Charlemagne's court in 798 and spread through his empire, but which, although it was in use in parts of Italy by the eighth century, was not accepted in Rome until 1014.

According to John Meyendorff, and John Romanides the Western efforts to get Pope Leo III to approve the addition of Filioque to the Creed were due to a desire of Charlemagne, who in 800 had been crowned in Rome as Emperor, to find grounds for accusations of heresy against the East. The Pope's refusal to approve the interpolation avoided arousing a conflict between East and West about this matter. Emperor Charlemagne accused the Patriarch of Constantinople (Saint Tarasios of Constantinople) of infidelity to the faith of the First Council of Nicaea, because he had not professed the procession of the Holy Spirit from the Father "and the Son", but only "through the Son", an accusation strongly rejected by Rome, but repeated in Charlemagne's commissioned work the Libri Carolini, books also rejected by the Pope.

=== Pope Leo III ===
In 808 or 809 controversy arose in Jerusalem between the Greek monks of one monastery and the Frankish Benedictines of another: the Greeks reproached the latter for, among other things, singing the creed with the Filioque included. In response, the theology of the Filioque was expressed in the 809 local Council of Aachen.

Pope Leo III unambiguously supported the current theological position in the West in his time: the filioque, that is that Holy Spirit proceeds from both the Father and the Son; he stated on this position: "it is forbidden not to believe such a great mystery of the faith". However, he refused to change the creed which he said was the product of the "divine illumination" of the council fathers, and considered not everything needed for salvation was in the creed. Leo III "placed two silver shields in Rome with the uninterpolated creed in both Greek and Latin". The Liber Pontificalis states Leo III put those shields "in his love for and as a safeguard for the orthodox faith".

== Photian controversy ==
Later again around 860AD the controversy over the Filioque and the Frankish monks broke out in the course of the disputes between Photius and Patriarch Ignatius of Constantinople. In 867, Photius was Patriarch of Constantinople and issued an Encyclical to the Eastern Patriarchs, and called a council in Constantinople in which he charged the Western Church with heresy and schism because of differences in practices, in particular for the Filioque and the authority of the Papacy. This moved the issue from jurisdiction and custom to one of dogma. This council declared Pope Nicholas anathema, excommunicated and deposed.

Photius excluded not only "and the Son" but also "through the Son" with regard to the eternal procession of the Holy Spirit: for him "through the Son" applied only to the temporal mission of the Holy Spirit (the sending in time). (Note: "Photius could concede that the Spirit proceeds through the Son in his temporal mission in the created order but not in his actual eternal being" [Henry Chadwick, East and West: The Making of a Rift in the Church (Oxford University Press, 2003 ISBN 0-19-926457-0), p. 154]) (Note: "Photius and the later Eastern controversialists dropped or rejected the per Filium, as being nearly equivalent to ex Filio or Filioque, or understood it as being applicable only to the mission of the Spirit, and emphasized the exclusiveness of the procession from the Father" (Philip Schaff, History of the Christian Church, volume IV, §108).) (Note: "In general, and already since Photius, the Greek position consisted in distinguishing theeternal procession of the Son from the Father, and the sending of the Spirit in time through the Son and by the Son") He maintained that the eternal procession of the Holy Spirit is "from the Father alone". This phrase was verbally a novelty. However, Orthodox theologians generally hold that in substance the phrase was only a reaffirmation of traditional teaching. Sergei Bulgakov, on the other hand, declared that Photius's doctrine itself "represents a sort of novelty for the Eastern church". (Note: In the same book, Bulgakov writes: "The Cappadocians expressed only one idea: the monarchy of the Father and, consequently, the procession of the Holy Spirit precisely from the Father. They never imparted to this idea, however, the exclusiveness that it acquired in the epoch of the Filioque disputes after Photius, in the sense of ek monou tou Patros (from the Father alone)" (p. 48); and what he wrote on page 96 has been summarized as follows: "Bulgakov finds it amazing that with all his erudition Photius did not see that the 'through the Spirit' of Damascene and others constituted a different theology from his own, just as it is almost incomprehensible to find him trying to range the Western Fathers and popes on his Monopatrist side.")

Photius's importance endured in regard to relations between East and West. He is recognized as a Saint by the Eastern Orthodox Church and his line of criticism has often been echoed later, making reconciliation between East and West difficult.

At least three councils (867, 869, 879) were held in Constantinople over the deposition of Ignatius by Emperor Michael III and his replacement by Photius. The Council of Constantinople of 867 was convened by Photius, so to address the question of Papal Supremacy over all of the churches and their patriarchs and the use of the filioque.

The council of 867 was followed by the Council of Constantinople 869, which reversed the previous council and was promulgated by Rome. The Council of Constantinople in 879 restored Photius to his see. It was attended by Western legates Cardinal Peter of St Chrysogonus, Paul Bishop of Ancona and Eugene Bishop of Ostia who approved its canons, but it is unclear whether it was ever promulgated by Rome.

== Adoption in Latin liturgy ==
It was only in 1014, at the request of the German King Henry II who had come to Rome to be crowned Emperor and was surprised at the different custom in force there, that Pope Benedict VIII, who owed to Henry his restoration to the papal throne after usurpation by Antipope Gregory VI, had the Creed, with the addition of Filioque, sung at Mass in Rome for the first time.

Since then the Filioque phrase has been included in the Creed throughout all the Latin liturgical rites except where Greek is used in the liturgy, although it was agreed to not be used by those Eastern Catholic Churches that were united with Rome by the Union of Brest.

== East-West schism ==
Eastern opposition to the Filioque strengthened with the East-West Schism of 1054. Two councils were held to heal the break discussed the question.

The Second Council of Lyon (1274) accepted the profession of faith of Emperor Michael VIII Palaiologos in the Holy Spirit, "proceeding from the Father and the Son".

The council of Lyons also condemned "all who presume to deny that the holy Spirit proceeds eternally from the Father and the Son, or rashly to assert that the holy Spirit proceeds from the Father and the Son as from two principles and not as from one."

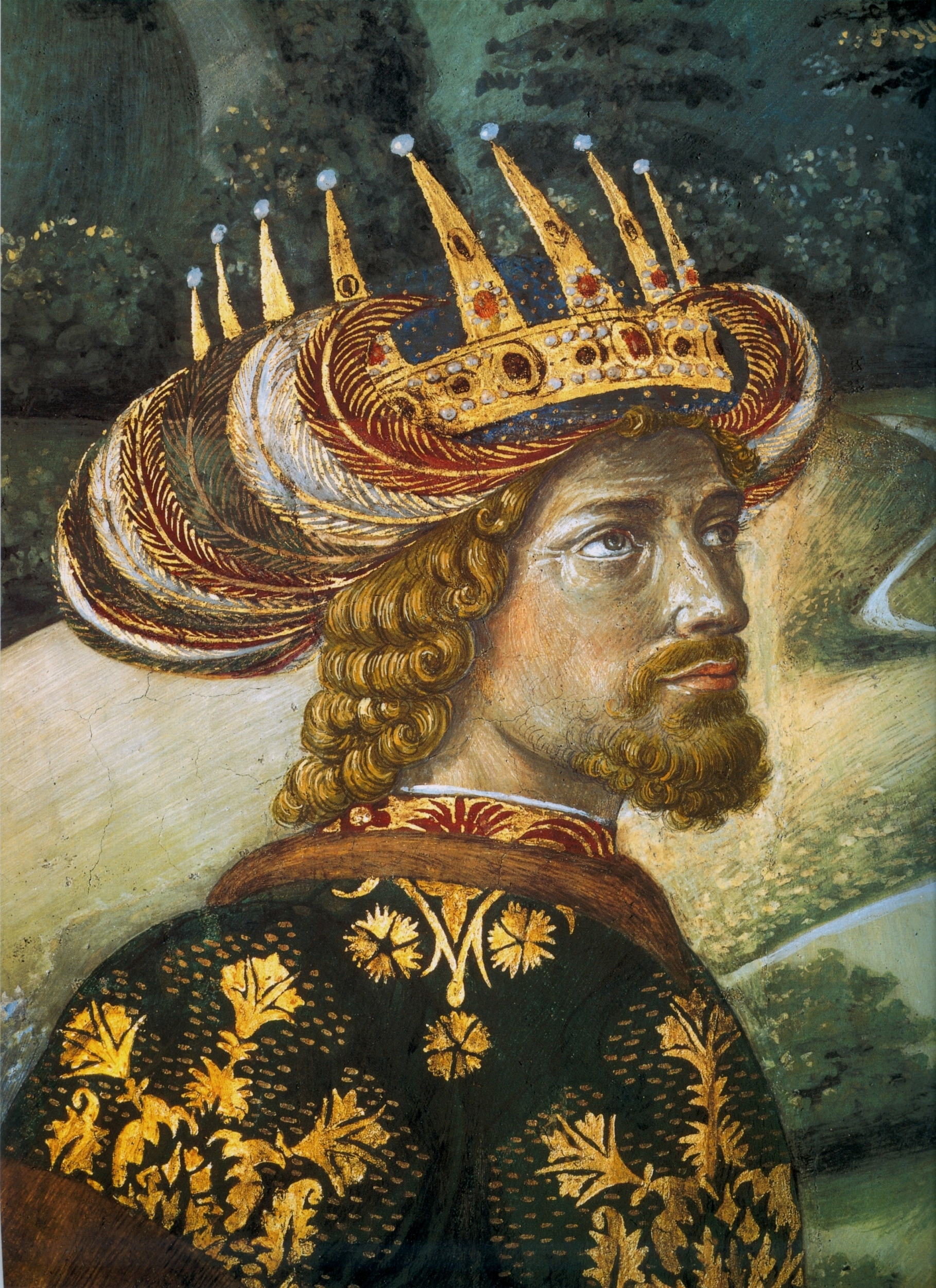
John VIII Palaiologos by Benozzo Gozzoli

Another attempt at reunion was made at the fifteenth-century Council of Florence, to which Emperor John VIII Palaiologos, Ecumenical Patriarch Joseph II of Constantinople, and other bishops from the East had gone in the hope of getting Western military aid against the looming Ottoman Empire. Thirteen public sessions held in Ferrara from 8 October to 13 December 1438 the Filioque question was debated without agreement. The Greeks held that any addition whatever, even if doctrinally correct, to the Creed had been forbidden by the Council of Ephesus, while the Latins claimed that this prohibition concerned meaning, not words.

During the council of Florence in 1439, accord continued to be elusive, until the argument prevailed among the Greeks themselves that, though the Greek and the Latin saints expressed their faith differently, they were in agreement substantially, since saints cannot err in faith; and by 8 June the Greeks accepted the Latin statement of doctrine. On 10 June Patriarch Joseph II died. A statement on the Filioque question was included in the Laetentur Caeli decree of union, which was signed on 5 July 1439 and promulgated the next day, with Mark of Ephesus being the only bishop to refuse his signature.

=== Council of Jerusalem in 1672 AD ===
In 1672, an Eastern Orthodox council was held in Jerusalem, presided by patriarch Dositheos Notaras. Council re-affirmed procession of the Holy Spirit from the Father alone.

== Recent discussion ==
Eastern Orthodox theologian Vasily Bolotov published in 1898 his "Thesen über das Filioque", in which he maintained that the Filioque, like Photios's "from the Father alone", was a permissible theological opinion (a theologoumenon, not a dogma) that cannot be an absolute impediment to reestablishment of communion. This thesis was supported by Eastern Orthodox theologians Sergei Bulgakov, Paul Evdokimov and I. Voronov, but was rejected by Vladimir Lossky.

Several Eastern Orthodox theologians have considered the Filioque anew, with a view to reconciliation of East and West.Theodore Stylianopoulos provided in 1986 an extensive, scholarly overview of the contemporary discussion. Twenty years after writing the first (1975) edition of his book, The Orthodox Church, Metropolitan Kallistos of Diokleia said that he had changed his mind and had concluded that "the problem is more in the area of semantics and different emphases than in any basic doctrinal differences": "the Holy Spirit proceeds from the Father alone" and "the Holy Spirit proceeds from the Father and the Son" may both have orthodox meanings if the words translated "proceeds" actually have different meanings. For some Orthodox, then, the Filioque, while still a matter of conflict, would not impede full communion of the Roman Catholic and Orthodox Churches if other issues were resolved. But many Orthodox consider that the Filioque is in flagrant contravention of the words of Christ in the Gospel,. (Note: Quoting Aleksey Khomyakov, Lossky says "The legal formalism and logical rationalism of the Roman Catholic Church have their roots in the Roman State. These features developed in it more strongly than ever when the Western Church without consent of the Eastern introduced into the Nicean Creed the filioque clause. Such arbitrary change of the creed is an expression of pride and lack of love for one's brethren in the faith. "In order not to be regarded as a schism by the Church, Romanism was forced to ascribe to the bishop of Rome absolute infallibility." In this way, Catholicism broke away from the Church as a whole and became an organization based upon external authority. Its unity is similar to the unity of the state: it is not super-rational but rationalistic and legally formal. Rationalism has led to the doctrine of the works of supererogation, established a balance of duties and merits between God and man, weighing in the scales sins and prayers, trespasses and deeds of expiation; it adopted the idea of transferring one person's debts or credits to another and legalized the exchange of assumed merits; in short, it introduced into the sanctuary of faith the mechanism of a banking house.") has been specifically condemned by the Orthodox Church, and remains a fundamental heretical teaching which divides East and West.

Eastern Orthodox Christians also object that, even if the teaching of the Filioque can be defended, its interpolation into the Creed is anti-canonical. The Roman Catholic Church, which like the Eastern Orthodox Church considers the teaching of the Ecumenical Councils to be infallible, "acknowledges the conciliar, ecumenical, normative and irrevocable value, as expression of the one common faith of the Church and of all Christians, of the Symbol professed in Greek at Constantinople in 381 by the Second Ecumenical Council. No profession of faith peculiar to a particular liturgical tradition can contradict this expression of the faith taught and professed by the undivided Church", but considers permissible additions that elucidate the teaching without in any way contradicting it, and that do not claim to have, on the basis of their insertion, the same authority that belongs to the original. It allows liturgical use of the Apostles' Creed as well of the Nicene Creed, and sees no essential difference between the recitation in the liturgy of a creed with orthodox additions and a profession of faith outside the liturgy such that of the Patriarch of Constantinople Saint Tarasius, who developed the Nicene Creed as follows: "the Holy Spirit, the Lord and giver of life, who proceeds from the Father through the Son".

Some theologians have even envisaged as possible acceptance of Filioque by the Eastern Orthodox Church (Vladimir Lossky) or of "from the Father alone" by the Catholic Church (André de Halleux).

The Catholic view that the Greek and the Latin expressions of faith in this regard are not contradictory but complementary has been expressed as follows:

At the outset the Eastern tradition expresses the Father's character as first origin of the Spirit. By confessing the Spirit as he "who proceeds from the Father", it affirms that he comes from the Father through the Son. The Western tradition expresses first the consubstantial communion between Father and Son, by saying that the Spirit proceeds from the Father and the Son (Filioque). ... This legitimate complementarity, provided it does not become rigid, does not affect the identity of faith in the reality of the same mystery confessed.

For this reason, the Roman Catholic Church has refused the addition of καὶ τοῦ Υἱοῦ to the formula ἐκ τοῦ Πατρὸς ἐκπορευόμενον of the Nicene Creed in the Churches, even of Latin Church, which use it in Greek with the Greek verb "έκπορεύεσθαι". Some Eastern Catholic Churches, semi-autonomous bodies within the Catholic Church, do not use the Filioque in the creed. (Note: "The original form of the Nicene Creed says that the Holy Spirit proceeds 'from the Father'. The phrase 'and the Son' was added, in the West, in the following centuries. Though it is quite true to say that the Spirit proceeds from both the 'Father and the Son', the Eastern Church, encouraged by the Holy See, has asked us to return to the original form of the Creed" (emphasis added))

=== Importance of Saint Maximus in ecumenical relations ===
The study published by the Pontifical Council for Promoting Christian Unity titled "The Greek and the Latin Traditions regarding the Procession of the Holy Spirit" says that, according to Maximus the Confessor, the phrase "and from the Son" does not contradict the Holy Spirit's procession from the Father as first origin (ἐκπόρευσις), since it concerns only the Holy Spirit's coming (in the sense of the Latin word processio and Cyril of Alexandria's προϊέναι) from the Son in a way that excludes any idea of subordinationism. The study says: "The Filioque does not concern the ἐκπόρευσις of the Spirit issued from the Father as source of the Trinity, but manifests his προϊέναι (processio) in the consubstantial communion of the Father and the Son, while excluding any possible subordinationist interpretation of the Father's monarchy".

Eastern Orthodox theologian and Metropolitan of Pergamon, John Zizioulas, says: "For Saint Maximus the Filioque was not heretical because its intention was to denote not the ἐκπορεύεσθαι (ekporeuesthai) but the προϊέναι (proienai) of the Spirit."

Zizioulas added (bold removed):

As Saint Maximus the Confessor insisted, however, in defence of the Roman use of the Filioque, the decisive thing in this defence lies precisely in the point that in using the Filioque the Romans do not imply a "cause" other than the Father. The notion of "cause" seems to be of special significance and importance in the Greek Patristic argument concerning the Filioque. If Roman Catholic theology would be ready to admit that the Son in no way constitutes a "cause" (aition) in the procession of the Spirit, this would bring the two traditions much closer to each other with regard to the Filioque.

In this regard, the study of the Pontifical Council for Promoting Christian Unity upholds the monarchy of the Father as the "sole Trinitarian Cause [aitia] or principle [principium] of the Son and the Holy Spirit" While the Council of Florence proposed the equivalency of the two terms "cause" and "principle" and therefore implied that the Son is a cause (aitia) of the subsistence of the Holy Spirit, the letter of the Pontifical Council distinguishes

between what the Greeks mean by 'procession' in the sense of taking origin from, applicable only to the Holy Spirit relative to the Father (ek tou Patros ekporeuomenon), and what the Latins mean by 'procession' as the more common term applicable to both Son and Spirit (ex Patre Filioque procedit; ek tou Patros kai tou Huiou proion). This preserves the monarchy of the Father as the sole origin of the Holy Spirit while simultaneously allowing for an intratrinitarian relation between the Son and Holy Spirit that the document defines as 'signifying the communication of the consubstantial divinity from the Father to the Son and from the Father through and with the Son to the Holy Spirit'."

Roman Catholic theologian Avery Dulles, writing of the Eastern fathers who, while aware of the currency of the Filioque in the West, did not generally regard it as heretical, said: "Some, such as Maximus the Confessor, a seventh-century Byzantine monk, defended it as a legitimate variation of the Eastern formula that the Spirit proceeds from the Father through the Son."

Michael Pomazansky and John Romanides (Note: 6. Neither the Roman papacy, nor the East Romans ever interpreted the council of 879 as a condemnation of the west Roman Filioque outside the Creed, since it did not teach that the Son is "cause" or "co-cause" of the existence of the Holy Spirit. This could not be added to the Creed where "procession" means "cause" of existence of the Holy Spirit. Neither Maximus the Confessor (7th century), nor Anastasius the Librarian (9th century) say that the west Roman Filioque "can be understood in an orthodox way," as claimed by the DAS (45, 95). They both simply explain why it is orthodox. Also neither uses the term "EKFANSIS" in their texts (DAS 45). Maximus uses the Greek term "PROΪENAI" and, being a west Roman and Latin speaking, Anastasius uses "Missio". Both point out that the Roman "procedere" has two meanings, "cause" and "mission". When used as "cause", like in the Creed, the Holy Spirit proceeds only from the Father. When used as "mission", the Holy Spirit, proceeds from the Father and the Son as denoting the consubstantiality of the Son with the Father. All East Roman Fathers say the same, but do not use the term "EKPOREYSIS" to do so. This mission of the Holy Spirit is not servile, but free since he has the same essence and its natural will, and by nature, from the father through/and the Son. Anastasius the Librarian, who was for a time pope, played an important role in the papacy's preparations for the council of 879 in New Rome. One would have to either conclude that the Roman papacy from the time of Leo III (795–816) had become schizophrenic, both supporting and condemning the Filioque, or else come up with some such analysis as this writer has been proposing.) hold that Maximus' position does not defend the actual way the Roman Catholic Church justifies and teaches the Filioque as dogma for the whole church. While accepting as a legitimate and complementary expression of the same faith and reality the teaching that the Holy Spirit proceeds from the Father through the Son. Maximus held strictly to the teaching of the Eastern Church that "the Father is the only cause of the Son and the Spirit" (Note: His own words, quoted above; cf. "Adhering to the Eastern tradition, John (of Damascus) affirmed (as Maximus had a century earlier) that "the Father alone is cause [αἴτιος]" of both the Son and the Spirit, and thus "we do not say that the Son is a cause or a father, but we do say that He is from the Father and is the Son of the Father") and wrote a special treatise about this dogma. (Note: "7. Not one West Roman Father ever said that the Son is either "cause" or "co-cause" of the Holy Spirit. This appears in Latin polemics and was promulgated as dogma at the council of Florence. This Filoque is a heresy, both as a theologoumenon and as a dogma. The Uniates accept this Filioque as a condition of being united to the Latin Papacy.") (Note: When the Eastern Church first noticed a distortion of the dogma of the Holy Spirit in the West and began to reproach the Western theologians for their innovations, St. Maximus the Confessor (in the 7th century), desiring to defend the Westerners, justified them precisely by saying that by the words “from the Son” they intended to indicate that the Holy Spirit is given to creatures through the Son, that He is manifested, that He is sent — but not that the Holy Spirit has His existence from Him. St. Maximus the Confessor himself held strictly to the teaching of the Eastern Church concerning the procession of the Holy Spirit from the Father and wrote a special treatise about this dogma.) (Note: This confusion is nowhere so clear than during the debates at the Council of Florence where the Franks used the terms "cause" and "caused" as identical with their generation and procession, and supported their claim that the Father and the Son are one cause of the procession of the Holy Spirit. Thus, they became completely confused over Maximos who explains that for the West of his time, the Son is not the cause of the existence of the Holy Spirit, so that in this sense the Holy Spirit does not proceed from the Father. That Anastasios the Librarian repeats this is ample evidence of the confusion of both the Franks and their spiritual and theological descendants.) Later again at the Council of Florence in 1438, the West held that the two views were contradictory. (Note: During the ensuing centuries-long course of the controversy, the Franks not only forced the Patristic tradition into an Augustinian mold, but they confused Augustine's Trinitarian terminology with that of the Father's of the First and Second Ecumenical Synods. This is nowhere so evident as in the Latin handling of Maximos the Confessor's description, composed in 650, of the West Roman Orthodox Filioque at the Council of Florence (1438–42). The East Romans hesitated to present Maximos' letter to Marinos about this West Roman Orthodox Filioque because the letter did not survive in its complete form. They were pleasantly surprised, however, when Andrew, the Latin bishop of Rhodes, quoted the letter in Greek in order to prove that in the time of Maximos there was no objection to the Filioque being in the Creed. Of course, the Filioque was not yet in the Creed. Then Andrew proceeded to translate Maximos into Latin for the benefit of the pope. However, the official translator intervened and challenged the rendition. Once the correct translation was established, the Franks then questioned the authenticity of the text. They assumed that their own Filioque was the only one in the West, and so they rejected on this ground Maximos' text as a basis of union.)

=== Greek verbs translated as "proceeds" ===
In 1995 the Pontifical Council for Promoting Christian Unity published a study titled "The Greek and the Latin Traditions regarding the Procession of the Holy Spirit", which pointed out an important difference in meaning between the Greek verb ἐκπορεύεσθαι and the Latin verb procedere, both of which are commonly translated as "proceed". The pontifical council stated that the Greek verb ἐκπορεύεσθαι indicates that the Spirit "takes his origin from the Father ... in a principal, proper and immediate manner", while the Latin verb, which corresponds rather to the verb προϊέναι in Greek, can be applied to proceeding even from a mediate channel.

Previously the 15th century, the Greek Catholic theologian Bessarion wrote: "That the Son is not the cause of the Spirit we can also say, for we understand the meaning of cause in the strictest sense, as used in the Greek idiom, whereby cause always is understood as the primordial first cause."

Metropolitan John Zizioulas, while maintaining the explicit Orthodox position of the Father as the single origin and source of the Holy Spirit, has declared that the recent document the Pontifical Council for Promoting Christian Unity shows positive signs of reconciliation. Zizioulas states "Closely related to the question of the single cause is the problem of the exact meaning of the Son's involvement in the procession of the Spirit. Saint Gregory of Nyssa explicitly admits a 'mediating' role of the Son in the procession of the Spirit from the Father. Is this role to be expressed with the help of the preposition δία (through) the Son (εκ Πατρός δι'Υιού), as Saint Maximus and other Patristic sources seem to suggest?" Zizioulas continues with "The Vatican statement notes that this is 'the basis that must serve for the continuation of the current theological dialogue between Catholic and Orthodox'. I would agree with this, adding that the discussion should take place in the light of the 'single cause' principle to which I have just referred." Zizioulas continues with saying that this "constitutes an encouraging attempt to clarify the basic aspects of the 'Filioque' problem and show that a rapprochement between West and East on this matter is eventually possible".

John Romanides too, while personally opposing the "Filioque", has stated that in itself, outside the Creed, the phrase is not considered to have been condemned by the 879–880 Council of Constantinople, "since it did not teach that the Son is 'cause' or 'co-cause' of the existence of the Holy Spirit"; however, it could not be added to the Creed, "where 'procession' (Note: ἐκπορευόμενον) means 'cause' of existence of the Holy Spirit".

=== Joint statement in the United States in 2003 ===
The Filioque was the main subject discussed at the 62nd meeting of the North American Orthodox-Catholic Theological Consultation, in June 2002. In October 2003, the Consultation issued an agreed statement, The Filioque: A Church-Dividing Issue?, which provides an extensive review of Scripture, history, and theology. The statement included some mutual recommendations for the two groups.

In the judgment of the consultation, the question of the Filioque is no longer a "Church-dividing" issue, which would impede full reconciliation and full communion.

=== Recent Papal Attitudes ===
Pope Francis omitted the Filioque during his 2021 pastoral visit to Greece. Pope Benedict XVI also omitted the Filioque while reciting the Creed with Ecumenical Patriarch Bartholomew I during the Feast of Sts. Peter and Paul in Rome.

== See also ==
- Papal infallibility

== Notes and references ==
Notes

Citations

== Bibliography ==
Much has been written on the Filioque; what follows is selective.

- Bradshaw, David (2004). Aristotle East and West: Metaphysics and the Division of Christendom. Cambridge: Cambridge University Press. pp. 214–220. ISBN 9780521828659.
- Bulgakov, Sergius (June 2004). The Comforter. Wm. B. Eerdmans Publishing Company. ISBN 978-0-8028-2112-6.
- Bury, John Bagnell (January 2012). A History of the Later Roman Empire from Arcadius to Irene, 395 A.D. to 800 A.D Volume 2. HardPress. ISBN 978-1-290-10221-6.
- Cleenewerck, Laurent (2008). His Broken Body: Understanding and healing the schism between the Roman Catholic and Eastern Orthodox Churches. Washington, DC: Euclid University Press. pp. 321–347.
- Cross, F. Frank Leslie; Livingstone, Elizabeth Anne (2005). "Double Procession of the Holy Spirit". The Oxford Dictionary Of The Christian Church. Oxford University Press. p. 614. ISBN 978-0-19-280290-3.
- Davies, Brian (1992). The Thought of Thomas Aquinas. Clarendon Press. ISBN 978-0-19-826458-3.
- Davies, Rupert Eric (1987-07-01). Making sense of the creeds. Epworth. ISBN 978-0-7162-0433-6.
- Farrell, Joseph P. (2010-01-13). God, History, & Dialectic: The Theological Foundations of the Two Europes and Their Cultural Consequences (Bound edition 1997. Electronic edition 2008 ed.).
- Farrell, Joseph P. (1987). The Mystagogy of the Holy Spirit by St Photius. Holy Cross Orthodox Press. ISBN 978-0-916586-88-1.
- Gibaut, John St. H. (1996). The Cursus Honorum and the Western Case Against Photius. Logos 37. pp. 35–73.
- Gribble, Richard (2010-11-18). "Procession of the Spirit". The Everything Guide to Catholicism: A complete introduction to the beliefs, traditions, and tenets of the Catholic Church from past to present. Everything Books. p. 99. ISBN 978-1-4405-0410-5.
- Groppe, Elizabeth Teresa (2004). Yves Congar's Theology of the Holy Spirit. New York: Oxford University Press. See esp. pp. 75–79, for a summary of Congar's work on the Filioque. Congar is widely considered the most important Roman Catholic ecclesiologist of the twentieth century. He was influential in the composition of several Vatican II documents. Most important of all, he was instrumental in the association in the West of pneumatology and ecclesiology, a new development.
- Guretzki, David (2009). Karl Barth on the Filioque. Farnham, UK: Ashgate. ISBN 978-0-7546-6704-9. Archived from the original on 2011-09-27. A close examination of Karl Barth's defense of the filioque and why his position is closer to an Eastern perspective than has typically been assumed.
- Habets, Myk, ed. (2014). Ecumenical perspectives on the Filioque for the 21st century. London-New York: Bloomsbury Academic. ISBN 9780567164711.
- Haugh, Richard (1975). Photius and the Carolingians: The Trinitarian Controversy. Belmont, MA: Nordland Publishing Company.
- Horton, Michael S. (2011-01-04). The Christian Faith: A Systematic Theology for Pilgrims on the Way. Zondervan. p. 526. ISBN 978-0-310-40918-2.
- Jungmann, Joseph (1962). "Christ our God". Pastoral Liturgy. London: Challoner. pp. 38–48.
- Kärkkäinen, Veli-Matti (2002). Pneumatology: The Holy Spirit in Ecumenical, International, and Contextual Perspective. Grand Rapids, MI: Baker Academic. ISBN 9780801024481.
- Kärkkäinen, Veli-Matti, ed. (2010). Holy Spirit and Salvation: The Sources of Christian Theology. Louisville, KY: Westminster John Knox Press. ISBN 9780664231361.
- Likoudis, James (1992). Ending the Byzantine Greek Schism. New Rochelle, New York. An apologetic response to polemical attacks. A useful book for its inclusion of important texts and documents; see especially citations and works by Thomas Aquinas, O.P., Demetrios Kydones, Nikos A. Nissiotis, and Alexis Stawrowsky. The select bibliography is excellent. The author demonstrates that the Filioque dispute is only understood as part of a dispute over papal primacy and cannot be dealt with apart from ecclesiology.
- Lossky, Nicholas O. (1970-03-01). History of Russian Philosophy. International Universities PressInc. p. 87. ISBN 978-0-8236-8074-0.
- Marshall, Bruce D. (January 2004). ""Ex Occidente Lux?" Aquinas and Eastern Orthodox Theology". Modern Theology. 20 (1): 23–50. doi:10.1111/j.1468-0025.2004.00241.x.. Reconsideration of the views of Aquinas, especially on deification and grace, as well as his Orthodox critics. The author suggests that Aquinas may have a more accurate perspective than his critics, on the systematic questions of theology that relate to the Filioque dispute.
- McGuckin, John Anthony (2010-12-09). The Orthodox Church: An Introduction to its History, Doctrine, and Spiritual Culture. John Wiley & Sons. p. 171. ISBN 978-1-4443-9383-5.
- Meyendorff, John (1979). Byzantine Theology: Historical Trends and Doctrinal Themes (2nd ed.). New York: Fordham University Press. ISBN 9780823209675.
- Meyendorff, John (1989). Imperial unity and Christian divisions: The Church 450-680 A.D. Crestwood, NY: St. Vladimir's Seminary Press. ISBN 9780881410556.
- Nichols, Aidan (2010-02-01). Rome and the Eastern Churches. Ignatius Press. p. 254. ISBN 978-1-58617-282-4.
- Nichols, Aidan (2005-10-31). Wisdom from Above. Gracewing Publishing. p. 157. ISBN 978-0-85244-642-3.
- Norwich, John J. (March 18, 1989). Byzantium: The Early Centuries. Knopf. ISBN 978-0394537788.
- O'Leary, De Lacy (2002). "The Nestorian Schism". The Syriac Church and Fathers. Gorgias Press LLC. p. 88. ISBN 978-1-931956-05-5.
- Papadakis, Aristeides (1997) [1983]. Crisis in Byzantium: The Filioque Controversy in the Patriarchate of Gregory II of Cyprus (1283-1289) (Rev. ed.). Crestwood, NY: St. Vladimir's Seminary Press. ISBN 9780881411768.
- Papadakis, Aristeides (1994). The Christian East and the Rise of the Papacy. Crestwood, NY: St. Vladimir's Seminary Press. pp. 232–238 and 379–408.
- Reid, Duncan (1997). Energies of the Spirit: Trinitarian Models in Eastern Orthodox and Western Theology. Atlanta, Georgia: Scholars Press.
- Siecienski, A. Edward (2005). The Use of Maximus the Confessor's Writing on the Filioque at the Council of Ferrara-Florence (1438–1439). Ann Arbor, Michigan: UMI Dissertation Services.
- Siecienski, Anthony Edward (2010). The Filioque: History of a Doctrinal Controversy. Oxford University Press. ISBN 9780195372045.
- Smith, Malon H. III (1978). And Taking Bread: Cerularius and the Azyme Controversy of 1054. Paris: Beauschesne. This work is still valuable for understanding cultural and theological estrangement of East and West by the turn of the millennium. Now, it is evident that neither side understood the other; both Greek and Latin antagonists assumed their own practices were normative and authentic.
- Tanner, Norman (2011-06-23). New Short History of the Catholic Church. Continuum International Publishing Group. p. 68. ISBN 978-0-86012-455-9.
- Vischer, Lukas, ed. (1981). "The Filioque Clause in Ecumenical Perspective". Spirit of God, Spirit of Christ: Ecumenical Reflections on the Filioque Controversy. London: Society for Promoting Christian Knowledge. pp. 3–18. ISBN 9782825406625.
- Ware, Timothy Kallistos (1993). The Orthodox Church. London: Penguin. pp. 52–61.
- Ware, Timothy Kallistos (1995). The Orthodox Way. Crestwood, New York. pp. 89–104.
- Wilhite, David E. (2009). "The Baptists "And the Son": The Filioque Clause in Noncreedal Theology". Journal of Ecumenical Studies. 44 (2): 285–302.
