= Photian schism =

9th-century schism between Rome and Constantinople

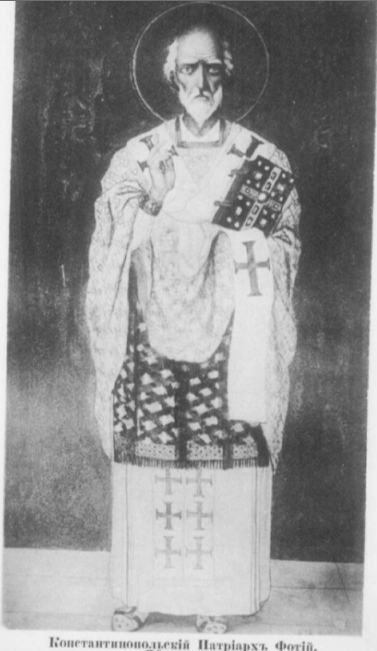
Icon of Photius from an image of a fresco in Saint Sophia's Cathedral, Kiev (1891)

The Photian Schism was a four-year (863–867) schism between the episcopal sees of Rome and Constantinople. The issue centred on the right of the Byzantine Emperor to depose and appoint a patriarch without approval from the papacy.

In 857, Ignatius was deposed or compelled to resign as Patriarch of Constantinople under the Byzantine Emperor Michael III for political reasons. He was replaced the following year by Photius. The pope, Nicholas I, despite previous disagreements with Ignatius, objected to what he considered the improper deposition of Ignatius and the elevation of Photius, a layman, in his place. After his legates exceeded their instructions in 861 by certifying Photius's elevation, Nicholas reversed their decision in 863 by excommunicating Photius.

The situation remained the same until 867. The West had been sending missionaries to Bulgaria. In 867, Photius called a council and excommunicated Nicholas and the entire western Church. That same year, high ranking courtier Basil I usurped the imperial throne from Michael III and reinstated Ignatius as patriarch. After Ignatius died in 877, Photius was brought back, but an agreement between him and Pope John VIII prevented a second schism. Photius was deposed again in 886, and spent his years in retirement condemning the West for its alleged heresy.

The main problem was the papal claim to jurisdiction in the East, not accusations of heresy. The schism arose largely as a struggle for ecclesiastical control of the southern Balkans and because of a personality clash between the heads of the two sees, both of whom were elected in the year 858 and both of whose reigns ended in 867. The Photian Schism preceded what occurred in the 11th century, when papal legates excommunicated the patriarch of Constantinople on the grounds of having lost that authority through heresy. The Photian Schism helped polarize the East and West for centuries, partially over a controversial but widespread belief in a second excommunication of Photius.

== Background ==
In the years shortly before 858, the Byzantine Empire emerged from a time of turmoil and entered into a period of relative stability following the crisis over Byzantine Iconoclasm. For nearly 120 years, from 720 to 843, Byzantines waged war with each other over the legitimacy of religious art, specifically whether that art constituted idol worship or merely legitimate veneration, with only the latter being acceptable according to Christian standards. Emperors generally took the side of the iconoclasts, who unlike the iconodules believed that such images were idolatrous. The situation reached a high point in 832 when Emperor Theophilos issued a decree banning the "worship" of icons in the Roman Empire. A number of people, including monks and bishops, were put in prison after they were discovered to have created sacred images or written in their defense. In 842, Theophilos died. He was succeeded by his wife Theodora, who in 843 restored the veneration of icons. She was at first opposed to the restoration, but her mind was changed by the eunuch Theoktistos and his relative Magister Sergius.

The period after iconoclasm was generally peaceful, but not entirely tranquil. Patriarch Methodius I accommodated former iconoclasts in the Church provided they renounce their heresy. He was opposed by certain "extremist" monks, particularly of the Stoudios monastery. Methodius excommunicated many of them before his death in 847. There was an intense struggle to succeed him. The election ended with the selection of the monk Ignatius, who took a hardline stance on officials in the empire who had been or still were iconoclasts.

In one instance, Archbishop Gregory Asbestas visited the new Patriarch before his coronation to do him homage. Whereupon Ignatius told Gregory that because he, a suspected iconoclast, had not been formally cleared, he could not attend the coronation ceremony. Gregory stormed out and was subsequently excommunicated in a synod for heresy and disobedience. He protested in 853 to Pope Leo IV. For reasons unclear, the Holy See allowed his case to continue into the reign of Leo’s successor, Pope Benedict III. Furthermore, Gregory and several other bishops had been condemned in a synod called by Ignatius without papal consent. Previous patriarchs had consulted the Bishop of Rome before calling a synod of bishops. Leo complained about this in a letter to the Patriarch. Another accusation made by Ignatius's enemies was that because he had not been elected in a synod and subsequently confirmed by the local emperor, instead simply being appointed by Theodora, he was not a true patriarch. Lazarus, Ignatius's envoy to Rome, had struggled to refute the charge, which seemed to create papal interest in Byzantine affairs.

== Beginning ==
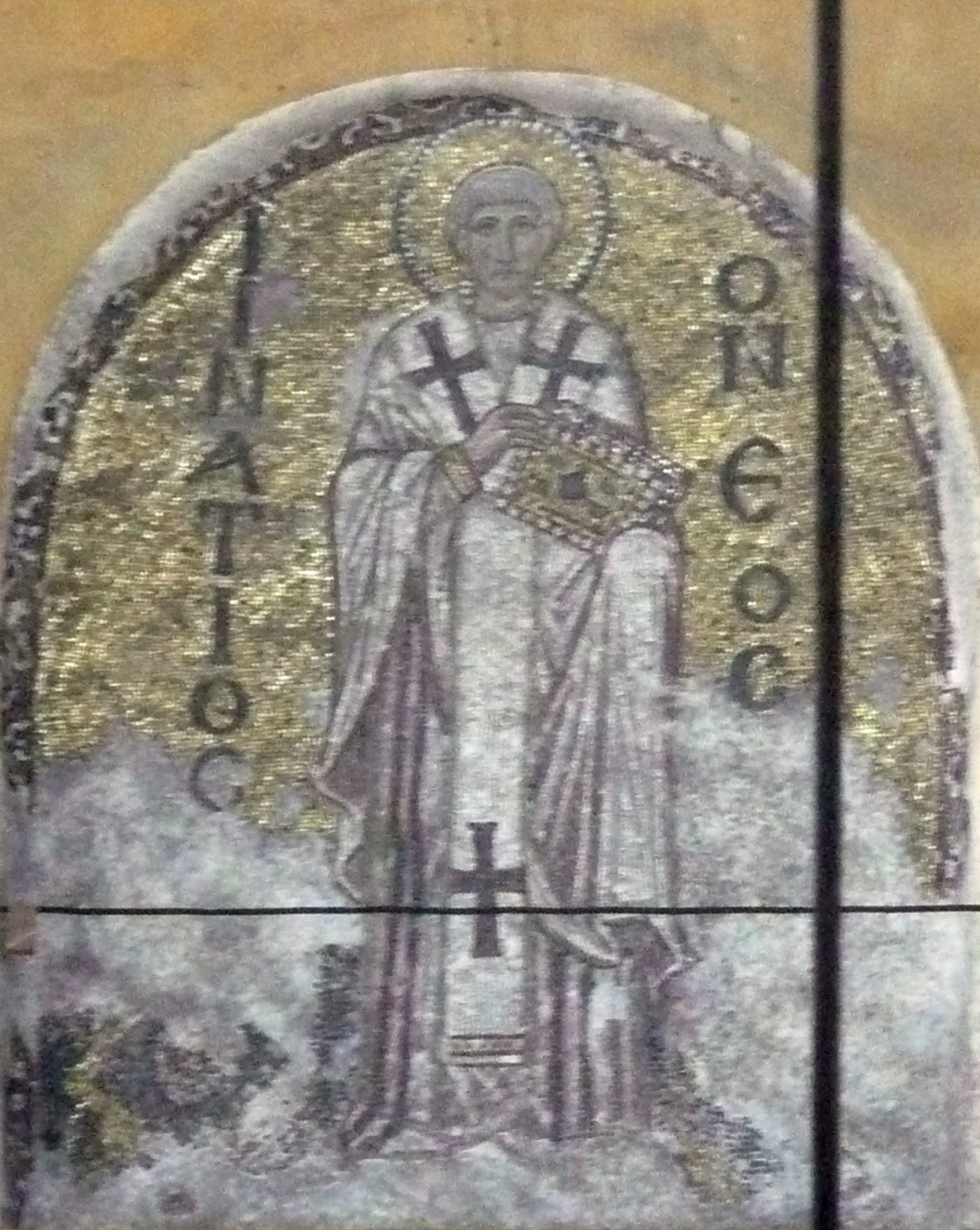
Ignatius

=== Exile of Ignatius ===
The schism was initially caused by problems in the Byzantine court. Michael III became emperor at a young age, while his mother Theodora served as regent. His uncle Bardas was an influential advisor. Church law forbade parodies of the sacred liturgies, but the young Emperor had them performed for his amusement. Former court officials testified at the Fourth Council of Constantinople (869–870) that they were forced to participate in these false ceremonies. Meanwhile, Bardas was accused of committing incest with his daughter-in-law. Because of this accusation, Ignatius publicly denied him the Eucharist in the Hagia Sophia, the main church structure of Constantinople, putting himself in open opposition to the imperial court.

Bardas intensified his attempts to consolidate power. In 855, he ordered the death of Theoktistos. Not long after, he, conspiring with the teenaged Michael, accused Theodora of intrigue and, as it was thought inappropriate to kill members of the imperial family, exiled her to a monastery. Theodora's deposition made him de facto ruler. Bardas asked or demanded that Ignatius approve of Theodora's exile. Ignatius had been appointed to his position by Theodora and, apparently out of loyalty to her, refused to give his consent. Several supporters of Ignatius organized a plot to murder Bardas; they were uncovered and beheaded in the Hippodrome. After this took place, a man named Gebeon claimed that he was Theodora’s son and the rightful king. Many partisans of Ignatius rallied around him. He was put on trial, and Ignatius undertook his defense. He lost the case and Gebeon was executed. Ignatius was then arraigned for high treason and exiled to Sedef Island in the Sea of Marmara in July 857.

There is a strong debate over whether or not Ignatius resigned the patriarchate. Had he done so, his disposition would technically have been valid, whereas this would not have been so had he refused. Contemporary sources provide some contradictions. Nicetas the Paphlagion, a contemporary and fierce partisan of Ignatius, insists that he did not resign. He claims that his resignation was demanded of him several times but that each time he refused, even when the influential court official Photius threatened his life at the instigation of Asbestas. The Council of 869, in condemning Photius, supports his assertion. Another contemporary source, known as the Life of St. Euthymios, contradicts this in stating that Ignatius did resign, "a decision in which he yielded partly to his own preference and partly to external pressure." Francis Dvornik, in his 1948 history of the Photian Schism, challenges the long-held western assertion that Ignatius was deposed. As evidence, he points to the fact that Nicetas did not directly say that he was deposed, only that he did not resign. He does however say that the pressure on him to do so must have been great.

=== Election of Photius ===
A synod was held to decide on a replacement for Ignatius. Asbestas was a likely candidate but was too partisan a figure to make for peace. Instead, the bishops decided on Photius. Photius came from a prominent Byzantine family with a reputation for orthodoxy. His uncle Tarasios was appointed Patriarch by the iconodule Empress Irene of Athens, serving from 784 to 806. Tarasios convened the Second Council of Nicaea, which condemned iconoclasm. Deciding not to become a monk and to pursue a lay career instead, he was a powerful associate of Bardas. He was a profound scholar with diverse interests and a wide range of knowledge.

Photius was hurriedly tonsured a monk on December 20, 858 and on the following four days was successively ordained lector, sub-deacon, deacon and priest. He was made patriarch on Christmas day. This rapid elevation was contrary to the Western canonical rules but not without precedent in Constantinople. One of the consecrating bishops was Asbestas.

== Reign of Photius and papal intervention ==
The reign of Photius I was immediately beset by trouble. When some bishops and most of the monasteries (most notably that of Studion) refused to recognize him, Photius held a synod in 859 that declared Ignatius no longer patriarch. He forbade anyone from taking part in demonstrations against the Emperor. He allegedly arrested several bishops who had been loyal to Ignatius. The supporters of Ignatius sought the aid of Pope Nicholas I. Despite the difficulties the papacy had experienced with Ignatius, the Pope strongly disapproved of what he considered to be the irregular nature of his apparent deposition. He at first hesitated but eventually sent a delegation to Constantinople to assess the matter. It consisted of two legates: Bishops Radoald of Porto and Zachary of Anagni.

The Pope wrote to Photius, expressing satisfaction at his orthodox profession of faith. He reproved his hurried uncanonical consecration, but promising that, if the legates' examination into the conduct of Ignatius supported the accusations made, he would accept Photius as patriarch, reserving judgement to himself. The legates attended a council which was held in May 861. The bishops knew that their instructions were only to report their findings back to Rome and not make any final decision. Nevertheless, Photius refused to reconvene the council unless there would be a decision from the legates on the spot as to the validity of his office. They agreed, supposedly through bribery, to accept Photius as patriarch. Exceeding their powers and perhaps under pressure from the imperial court, they disobeyed their instructions. Photius also seems to have made use of adulation in bringing them to their decision. In one of his sermons, supposedly delivered in the legates' presence, he said:

Peter who denied his master on being questioned by a maid, and declared under oath that he did not know Him, and although convicted of perjury, yet with his tears he cleansed the pollution of his denial so thoroughly, that he was not deprived of being the chief of the apostolic chair, and has been established as the foundation-rock of the Church, and is proclaimed by Truth to be the keybearer of the Kingdom of Heaven.

Byzantine theology tended to diminish the role of the pope, although it acknowledged him as first among equals. Eastern Christians rejected his ability to unilaterally define dogma or to have any greater authority than other bishops.

Dvornik notes that the council marked the first time that the East acknowledged the right of the West to try a Byzantine patriarch. Nevertheless, Nicholas I eventually disavowed the legates' choice. In 863, he held a synod of his own in Rome, which annulled the proceedings of the 861 synod in Constantinople, condemned Photius, and reinstated Ignatius. In doing so, he asserted that no council or synod could be called without papal permission. The legates were summoned before the Pope to answer for their disobedience. Zachary confessed to the Pope that he had exceeded his powers and was forgiven. Radoald refused to appear before the Pope, was condemned in 864, and was threatened with anathema should he ever again attempt to make contact with Photius.

== Bulgaria and complication of Rome ==
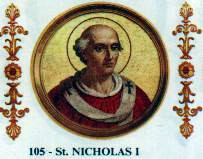
Pope Nicholas I

After Nicholas ruled against him, Photius refused to react. He remained silent, neither denouncing the Pope openly nor acting as if anything had happened. Michael sent Nicholas a strongly worded letter attacking papal primacy and the use of the Latin language. In Nicholas's response, he strongly defends the superiority of see of Rome as the only jurisdiction with immutable claims to apostolic tradition. He then invited both Ignatius and Photius to come to Rome to argue their cases, or to send proxies for this purpose. But rivalry erupted at this stage in relation to the Bulgars. Khan Boris I fought the Byzantines in a short war that resulted in his capitulation and conversion to Christianity and promise to convert his people. On being refused a separate patriarch for these new Christians by Photius, Boris had invited Latin missionaries. The delegation was led by the Bishop of Porto, the future Pope Formosus, who actively tried to convert the population to Latin Christianity. He denounced Byzantine customs of clerical marriage, the use of leavened instead of unleavened bread in the Eucharist, and the omission of the filioque in the Nicene Creed. The mission was met with great success. Boris asked that Formosus be made the Bulgarian archbishop. However, he was recalled to Rome by Nicholas. Formosus was still serving as Bishop of Porto. Canon law forbade anyone from serving as bishop of two diocese at once, and Nicholas was unwilling to relieve him of his lower duties and give him a promotion. Historian Johann Peter Kirsch has suggested that he viewed Formosus as a rival.

In 867, Photius attacked these Latin missionaries for adding the filioque to the Creed. He did not make this accusation against the Western Church as whole, still less against Rome, which at that time had not accepted this addition to the Creed. Only in the late 13th century, when the filioque was central to Byzantine polemics, were his arguments adopted, and few would refer to them until then.

Filioque literally means "and from the Son". In the context of the Nicene Creed, it was meant to state that the Holy Spirit proceeds not only from the Father but from the Son as well. The West held that the term was theologically sound, and that the Pope, as Vicar of Christ and successor to Saint Peter, had the right to add it to the Creed if he wished. The East rejected both views. The doctrinal question of the relationship between the three persons of the Holy Trinity would eventually often find itself subordinated to the more personal and politically important question of whether the Pope had the right to add anything to the Creed at all without the consent of the other bishops.

Khan Boris I of Bulgaria would further complicate relations between Rome and Constantinople by approaching Pope Nicholas. Photius was aware of Boris's approaches and sought to ease his mind on how to be a Christian leader by writing him a lengthy letter called "On the Duties of a Prince". Boris had also asked the Pope 115 questions, which Pope Nicholas answered in Responsa Nicolai papae I. ad consulta Bulgarorum (The Responses of Pope Nicholas I to the Questions of the Bulgars). However, due to the Pope's refusal to appoint Formosus as archbishop of Bulgaria, the Khan once again turned to Byzantium, which granted Bulgaria autocephalous status during the Fourth Council of Constantinople. In 865, Boris received baptism under the name Michael, in honor of the Byzantine Emperor.

Further north than Bulgaria, in Greater Moravia, the Slavic prince asked Photius to send Byzantine missionaries to his jurisdiction. Photius sent a delegation led by the brothers Cyril and Methodius. Eventually, they sided with the West against Photius after Pope Adrian II authorized their use of Slavonic liturgy which they had just invented. In 866, Michael conspired with Basil I to kill Bardas, alleging that he had been plotting to take over as emperor. Basil was then installed as co-emperor.

With the approval of the Emperor, who feared an advance of the Franks close to his capital, Photius invited the patriarchs of Alexandria, Antioch and Jerusalem to meet in Constantinople and pronounce on the "encroachment" into Bulgaria. This 867 synod took the grave step of condemning Pope Nicholas as a heretic and declaring him deposed. He was excommunicated along with anyone who followed him, which presumably meant the whole Church of the West.

== Conclusion ==
Nicholas died in November 867 before news of this action reached Rome. In 867, Basil assassinated Michael and deposed Photius, replacing him at the end of the year with the exiled Ignatius. Ignatius did not formally reconcile with the West, but he did take action against Photius in a manner to please the West. The Fourth Council of Constantinople, held from 869–870, declared that "Photius never was a bishop," thereby invalidating all of his acts. He was condemned for his "diabolical and fraudulent actions in the synod of 867" as well as for his "defamatory writings" against the Pope. The Council, remembering how Photius came to power, declared that no man could be raised to the rank of bishop without having spent at least ten years in a lower clerical state.

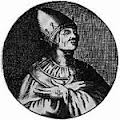
Pope John VIII helped resolve the Photian Schism.

Ignatius upheld Byzantine claims to Bulgaria no less strongly than Photius. Tensions between Rome and Constantinople remained. Ignatius, suffering from a shortage of clergy, wrote to Adrian II asking that penalties imposed on bishops who had supported Photius be lifted. Adrian refused to oblige. Ignatius ruled until his death on October 23, 877. Before dying, he had made a secret agreement with Basil I and Photius to restore the former patriarch to the throne. This was duly carried out, with Photius retaking his former position as patriarch on October 26. This was witnessed in shock by the papal legates, Paul and Eugene. They had received no instructions from Pope John VIII on what to do in such a course of events. Possibly remembering the fate of Radoald and Zachary, the legates did nothing. The Pope was probably satisfied with their cautious performance. Basil, however, was frustrated by the delay, and he wrote to John VIII asking that he recognize Photius and making it clear that Photius's election had been accepted virtually unanimously. As proof, he forwarded letters of assent from three other eastern patriarchs. Simultaneously, Basil acknowledged the Pope to be the head of the universal Church.

Pope John was probably displeased by Photius's elevation, but understanding the political realities, proposed a compromise. In his letter to Basil, he acknowledged with gratitude the Emperor's submission, invoking the Biblical passage in which Jesus instructed Peter, the first pope, to "Feed my sheep." John released Photius and his bishops from censures applied to them, invoking his power to bind and loose. He promised to accept Photius as patriarch but demanded that he apologize before a synod of bishops for his past conduct. This last request proved to be a major obstacle. Photius insisted that his actions in 867 were justified in the midst of Nicholas's interference in Eastern Church matters. In any event, he had been sufficiently punished by the Synod of 869 and had made peace with Ignatius before his death. This should be enough. The legates conceded to his demands and on their own authority absolved Photius of fulfilling this request in return for an acknowledgement of papal supremacy in Bulgaria. Rome was given nominal authority over Bulgaria but actual jurisdiction was in the hands of Constantinople. Dvornik calls John's demand for an apology "obnoxious," arguing that it was entirely unnecessary and would have humiliated Photius.

The Fourth Council of Constantinople (879–880) formally reconciled the Bishop of Rome and the Patriarch of Constantinople. A letter from Pope John VIII to Photius confirms his assent to the actions of his legates.

== Aftermath ==
Photius served as patriarch for six more years. A small group of Ignatians refused to recognize him, but it is unclear how much influence they had. In 886, following the death of Basil, Leo VI the Wise became emperor. Almost immediately, Leo exacted a resignation from Photius and replaced Photius with his (Leo's) brother Stephen I. Photius was sent to live in a monastery, where he spent the remainder of his days unmolested. Sometime during his second exile, Photius composed On the Mystagogy of the Holy Spirit, in which he sharply criticized the Western tradition of using the filioque. In the Mystagogy, he attacks those who "accept impious and spurious doctrines...that the Holy Spirit is distant and mediated." By believing that the Holy Spirit proceeds not from the Father alone but also from the Son, he says, one "alienate[s] the Holy Spirit from the Father's hypostasis." The error is equivalent to polytheism, because it creates three gods which are distinct from one another, rather than being consubstantial. Upon all those who believe and teach such doctrines, he imposed an anathema.

Overall, relations between the East and West remained relatively peaceful until shortly before the East–West Schism in 1054. Unlike the Photian schism, this one had its primary roots not in politics but in accusations of heresy. At the time of the Photian Schism, the Pope was still widely recognized in the Byzantine Empire as "first among equals". Only later would it be alleged that he had lost that standing due to heresy. The exact degree to which the Photian Schism truly initiated a lasting challenge of papal claims in the East has been disputed. There are indications that some people the East still considered the pope's authority in the period of time between the Photian Schism and the 11th century as that of the head of the Church with supreme authority; indeed, even Photius himself seemed at several occasions to acknowledge the supreme authority of Peter among apostles and to it being passed down to his Roman successors.

== Legacy ==
Photius and the schism associated with him have been viewed very differently by Catholics and Eastern Orthodox Christians throughout history. The West has looked upon him as a heretic and schismatic, while the East has seen him as a hero for his resistance to Western encroachment. Part of the reason for polarizing views on Photius and the events surrounding him was the legend of a second excommunication in 880. It was alleged that John VIII had changed his mind about recognizing Photius around the time of the council in 880 and had in fact excommunicated him again. Supposedly, this excommunication was maintained by John's successors. The widespread belief that Photius was an "arch-heretic" was challenged by some Protestants in the 17th century. However, it was not until the 20th century that scholars, particularly Dvornik, began to carefully analyze the historical records surrounding the events of the late 9th century. From their research, they concluded that no second schism existed. This has contributed to a partial rehabilitation of Photius.

== Bibliography ==
=== Primary sources ===
- Saint Photios I (1983). On the Mystagogy of the Holy Spirit. Translated by Wertz, Ronald. Astoria, OR: Studion Publishers. ISBN 9780943670003.
- Photius I of Constantinople (2018). The Homilies of Photius, Patriarch of Constantinople: English Translation, Introduction, and Commentary. Translated by Mango, Cyril. Eugene, OR: Wipf and Stock Publishers. ISBN 978-1-5326-4138-1.

=== Secondary sources ===
- Bokenkotter, Thomas S. (1990) [1979]. A Concise History of the Catholic Church: Revised and Expanded Edition. New York, NY: Doubleday. ISBN 9780307423481.
- Brubaker, Leslie; Haldon, John (2011). Byzantium in the Iconoclast Era, c. 650–850: A History. Cambridge, UK: Cambridge University Press. ISBN 9780521430937.
- Cross, F.L.; Livingstone, Elizabeth A. (2005). The Oxford Dictionary of the Christian Church. Oxford, UK: Oxford University Press. ISBN 978-0-19-280290-3.
- Greenwood, Thomas (1859). "VI–VII". Cathedra Petri: A Political History of the Great Latin Patriarchate. Vol. 3. London, UK.
- Parry, Ken; Melling, David J.; Brady, Dimitri; Griffith, Sidney H.; Healey, John H., eds. (1999). The Blackwell Dictionary of Eastern Christianity. Oxford, UK: Blackwell Publishers.
- Dvornik, Francis (1948). The Photian Schism: History and Legend. Cambridge, UK: Cambridge University Press.
- Geanakopolos, Deno J. (1966). Byzantine East and Latin West: Two Worlds of Christendom in Middle Ages and Renaissance. New York, NY: Harper & Row. ISBN 9780208016157.
- Hussey, Joan M. (1986). The Orthodox Church in the Byzantine Empire. Oxford, UK: Oxford University Press. ISBN 978-01915-2049-5.
- Kirsch, Johann Peter (1909). "Pope Formosus" . In Herbermann, Charles G.; Pace, Edward A.; Pallen, Condé B.; Shahan, Thomas J.; Wynne, John J. (eds.). Catholic Encyclopedia. Vol. 6. New York, NY: Encyclopedia Press. pp. 139–141.
- Kleinhenz, Christopher, ed. (2004). Medieval Italy: An Encyclopedia. Vol. 2. New York, NY: Routledge. ISBN 978-0-415-93931-7.
- Laiou, Angeliki E.; Mottahedeh, Roy Parviz (2001). The Crusades from the Perspective of Byzantium and the Muslim World. Washington, D.C.: Dumbarton Oaks. ISBN 978-0-88402-277-0.
- Meyendorff, John (1979). Byzantine Theology. New York, NY: Fordham University Press. p. 94. ISBN 978-0-8232-0967-5.
- Nichols, Aidan (2010). Rome and the Eastern Churches. Ignatius Press. ISBN 978-1-58617-282-4.
- Scott, Sidney Herbert (1928). The Eastern Churches and the Papacy. London, UK: Sheed & Ward. OCLC 960374374.
- Tougher, Shaun (1997). The Reign of Leo VI (886–912): Politics and People. Leiden, The Netherlands: Brill. ISBN 978-9004-10811-0.
- Treadgold, Warren (1997). A History of the Byzantine State and Society. Stanford, California: Stanford University Press. ISBN 0-8047-2630-2.
- Vlasto, A.P. (1970). The Entry of the Slavs into Christendom. Cambridge, UK: Cambridge University Press. ISBN 9780521074599.
