= Trinitarian controversy =

Trinitarian controversy — in the history of Christian Churches were the controversies on how the Persons of the Holy Trinity relate to one another.

Most important are:

- Modalist controversy (Sabellianism) (since 2nd century)
- Arian controversy (4-5th century)
- Filioque controversy
- Socinian controversy (19th century)
