= Council of Constantinople (861) =

The Council of Constantinople of 861, also known as Protodeutera, was a major Church Council, convened upon the initiative of Emperor Michael III of Byzantium and Patriarch Photios I of Constantinople, and attended by legates of Pope Nicholas I. The Council confirmed the deposition of former Patriarch Ignatius of Constantinople, and his replacement by Photios. Several dogmatic, ecclesiological and liturgical questions were also discussed, and seventeen canons were produced. Decisions of the Council were initially approved by papal legates, but their approval was later annulled by the Pope. In spite of that, the Council is considered as valid by the Eastern Orthodox Church.

== History ==
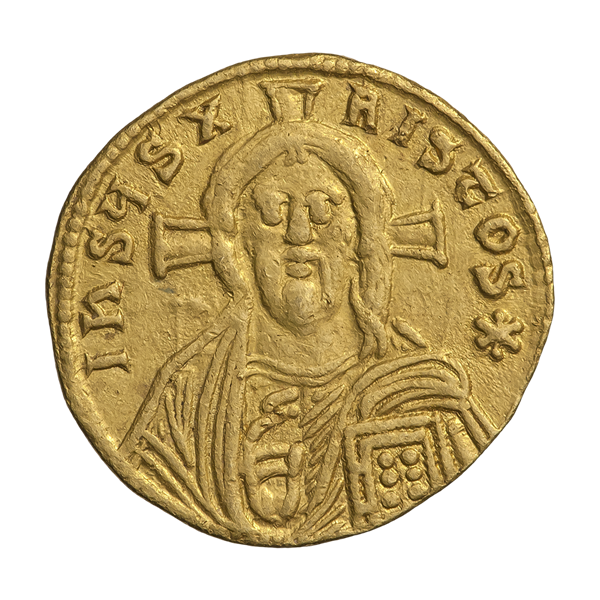
Representation of Jesus Christ on the golden solidus of Byzantine Emperor Michael III (842-867)

In 860, Eastern Roman Emperor Michael III (842-867) and Patriarch Photios I of Constantinople decided to convene a major church council in order to resolve several doctrinal, ecclesiological and liturgical questions. They approached Pope Nicholas I (858-867), who decided to send his representatives to the Council. Papal legates, bishops Radoald of Porto and Zachary of Anagni, were well-received in Constantinople, and soon upon their arrival the Council was convened in the spring of 861. Among major issues discussed at the Council, the most significant were various questions regarding earlier (858) deposition of former Patriarch Ignatius of Constantinople, and in connection with that the questions regarding canonical validity of appointment and speedy promotion of his successor, Patriarch Photios. After extensive deliberation, the Council confirmed the validity of earlier deposition of Ignatius and election of Photios. Such conclusions were also approved by papal legates at the Council, but their approval was later (863) annulled by the Pope.

== See also ==
- Schism of 863
- Council of Constantinople (867)
