= Chomýž =

- Municipality
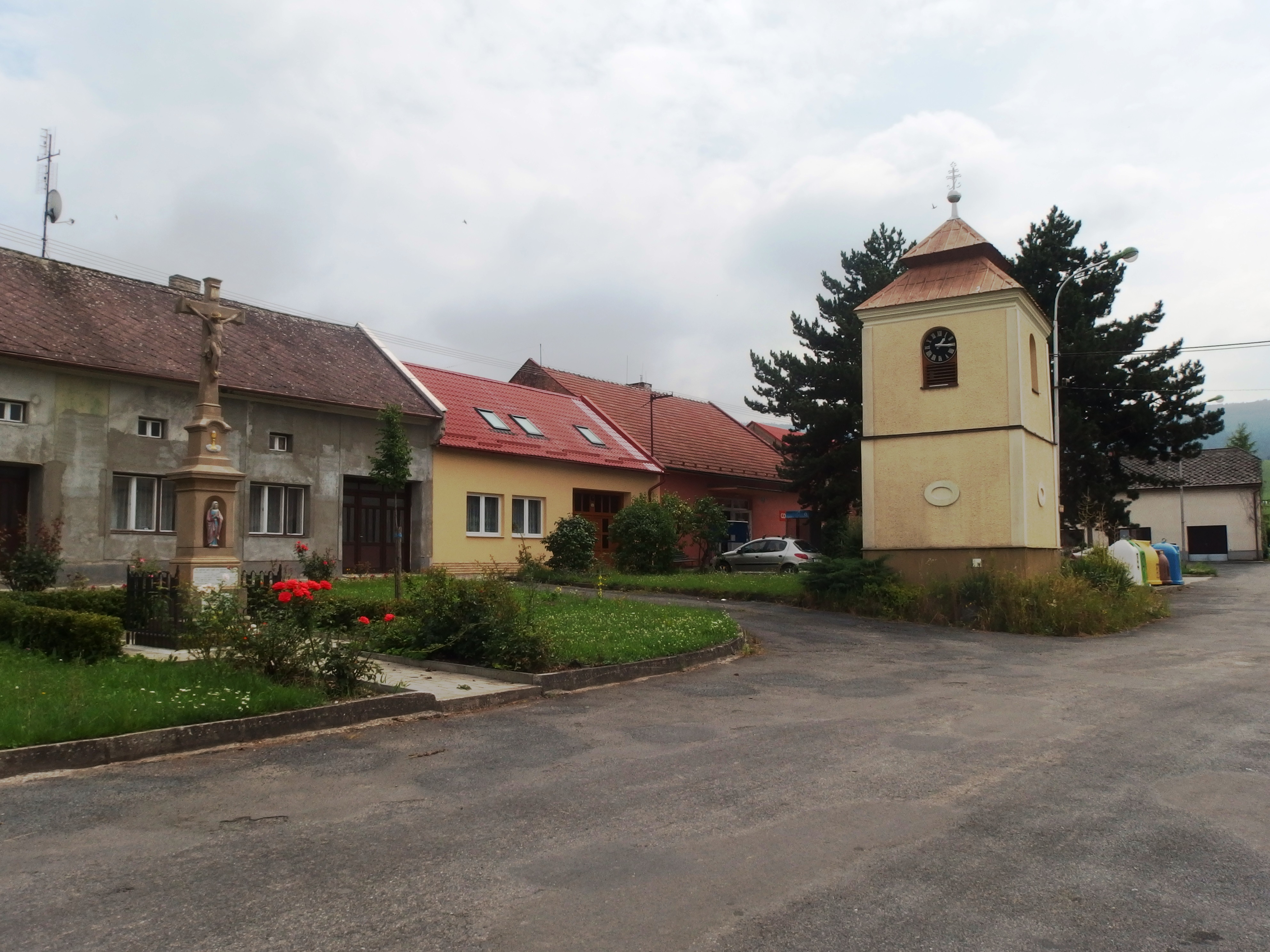
- Centre of Chomýž with belfry and cross

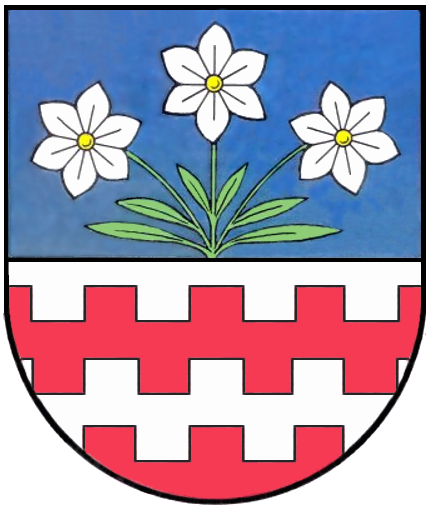
- Coat of arms

- Location in the Czech Republic
- Coordinates: 49°21′45″N 17°38′44″E
- Country: Czech Republic
- Region: Zlín
- District: Kroměříž
- First mentioned: 1365

Area
  - Total: 3.56 km^{2} (1.37 sq mi)
- Elevation: 297 m (974 ft)

Population (2026-01-01)
  - Total: 359
  - Density: 101/km^{2} (261/sq mi)
- Time zone: UTC+1 (CET)
  - Summer (DST): UTC+2 (CEST)
- Postal code: 768 61
- Website: www.chomyz.cz

Chomýž (German: Komeisch) is a municipality and village in Kroměříž District in the Zlín Region of the Czech Republic. It has about 400 inhabitants.

Chomýž lies approximately 20 kilometres (12 mi) east of Kroměříž, 15 km (9 mi) north of Zlín, and 246 km (153 mi) east of Prague.

== Demographics ==
Historical population
Year	Pop.	±%
1869	327	—
1880	352	+7.6%
1890	349	−0.9%
1900	391	+12.0%
1910	408	+4.3%
1921	378	−7.4%
1930	335	−11.4%
1950	345	+3.0%
1961	352	+2.0%
1970	328	−6.8%
1980	375	+14.3%
1991	329	−12.3%
2001	346	+5.2%
2011	347	+0.3%
2021	357	+2.9%
Source: Censuses

== Notable people ==
- Francis Dvornik (1893–1975), historian and priest
