= Fourth Council of Constantinople (Eastern Orthodox) =

Synod accepted by the Eastern Orthodox Church

- Date: 879–880
- Accepted by: Eastern Orthodoxy
- Previous council: Second Council of Nicaea
- Next council: Fifth Council of Constantinople
- Convoked by: Emperor Basil I
- Attendance: 383 bishops
- Topics: Photius' patriarchate
- Documents and statements: Restoration of Photius, protection of Nicene creed

The Fourth Council of Constantinople was held in 879–880. It confirmed the reinstatement of Photius I as patriarch of Constantinople.

The result of this council is accepted by the Eastern Orthodox as having the authority of an ecumenical council. In Eastern Orthodoxy, it is sometimes called the eighth ecumenical council.

== Background ==
The Council settled the dispute that had broken out after the deposition of Ignatius as Patriarch of Constantinople in 858. Ignatius, himself appointed to his office in an uncanonical manner, opposed Caesar Bardas, who had deposed the regent Theodora. In response, Bardas' nephew, the youthful Emperor Michael III engineered Ignatius's deposition and confinement on the charge of treason. The patriarchal throne was filled with Photius, a renowned scholar and kinsman of Bardas. The deposition of Ignatius without a formal ecclesiastical trial and the sudden promotion of Photius caused scandal in the church. Pope Nicholas I and the western bishops took up the cause of Ignatius and condemned Photius' election as uncanonical. In 863, at a synod in Rome the pope deposed Photius, and reappointed Ignatius as the rightful patriarch. However, Photius enjoined the support of the Emperor and responded by calling a Council and excommunicating the pope.

This state of affairs changed when Photius's patrons, Bardas and Emperor Michael III, were murdered in 866 and 867, respectively, by Basil the Macedonian, who now usurped the throne. Photius was deposed as patriarch, not so much because he was a protégé of Bardas and Michael, but because Basil was seeking an alliance with the Pope and the western emperor. Photius was removed from his office and banished about the end of September 867, and Ignatius was reinstated on 23 November. Photius was condemned by a Council held at Constantinople from 5 October 869 to 28 February 870. Photius was deposed and barred from the patriarchal office, while Ignatius was reinstated.

== Council of 879–880 ==
After the death of Ignatius in 877, the Emperor made Photius again Patriarch of Constantinople. A council was convened in 879, held at Constantinople, comprising the representatives of all the five patriarchates, including that of Rome (all in all 383 bishops). Anthony Edward Siecienski writes: "In 879 the emperor called for another council to meet in Constantinople in the hopes that the new pope, John VIII (872-882) would recognize the validity of Photius's claim upon the patriarchate. This council, sometimes called the eighth ecumenical in the East was attended by the papal legates (who had brought with them a gift from the pope—a pallium for Photius) and by over 400 bishops, and who immediately confirmed Photius as rightful patriarch."

The council also implicitly condemned the addition of the Filioque to the Nicene-Constantinopolitan Creed: "The Creed (without the filioque) was read out and a condemnation pronounced against those who 'impose on it their own invented phrases [ἰδίας εὑρεσιολογίαις] and put this forth as a common lesson to the faithful or to those who return from some kind of heresy and display the audacity to falsify completely [κατακιβδηλεῦσαι άποθρασυνθείη] the antiquity of this sacred and venerable Horos [Rule] with illegitimate words, or additions, or subtractions'." Eastern Orthodox Christians argue that thereby the council condemned not only the addition of the Filioque clause to the creed but also denounced the clause as heretical (a view strongly espoused by Photius in his polemics against Rome), while Roman Catholics separate the two and insist on the theological orthodoxy of the clause. According to non-Catholic Philip Schaff, "To the Greek acts was afterwards added a (pretended) letter of Pope John VIII to Photius, declaring the Filioque to be an addition which is rejected by the church of Rome, and a blasphemy which must be abolished calmly and by degrees."

== Confirmation and further reception ==
The formal consultations were completed and final statements drawn up and signed by those present during the fifth session which took place on 26 January 880. The council was held in the presence of papal legates, who approved of the proceedings. Emperor Basil I signed the decrees in a sixth session in the imperial palace on 3 March 880, followed by an imperial acclamation and a speech of thanks by the metropolitan of Ancyra.

Roman Catholic historian Francis Dvornik argues that the pope accepted the acts of the council and annulled those of the Council of 869–870. Other Catholic historians, such as Warren Carroll, dispute this view, arguing that the pope rejected the council. Siecienski says that the Pope gave only a qualified assent to the acts of the council. Philip Schaff opines that the pope, deceived by his legates about the actual proceedings, first applauded the emperor but later denounced the council. In any case, the Pope had already accepted the reinstatement of Photius as Patriarch.

On 8 March 870, three days after the end of the council, the papal and Eastern delegates met with the Bulgarian ambassadors led by the kavhan Peter to decide the status of the Bulgarian Orthodox Church. Since the Bulgarians were not satisfied with the positions of the Pope after prolonged negotiations, they reached favorable agreement with the Byzantines and the decision was taken that the Bulgarian Church should become Eastern Christian.

The Photian Schism (863–867) that led to the councils of 869 and 879 represents a break between East and West. While the previous seven ecumenical councils are recognized as ecumenical and authoritative by both East and West, many Eastern Orthodox Christians recognize the council of 879 as the Eighth Ecumenical Council, arguing that it annulled the earlier one. This council is referred to as Ecumenical in the Encyclical of the Eastern Patriarchs of 1848. The Catholic Church, however, recognizes the council of 869 as the eighth ecumenical council and does not place the council of 879 among its ecumenical councils.

== See also ==
- Fifth Council of Constantinople

== Bibliography ==
- Dvornik, Francis (1948). The Photian Schism: History and Legend. Cambridge, UK: Cambridge University Press.
- Ostrogorsky, George (1956). History of the Byzantine State. Oxford: Basil Blackwell.
- Siecienski, Anthony Edward (2010). The Filioque: History of a Doctrinal Controversy. Oxford University Press. ISBN 9780195372045.
- Nichols, Aidan. Rome And The Eastern Churches. Liturgical Press.
- van Bochove, Thomas Ernst (24 July 2023). To Date and Not to Date: On the Date and Status of Byzantine Law Books. BRILL. ISBN 978-90-04-67565-0.
