= Ignatios of Constantinople =

Ecumenical Patriarch of Constantinople from 847 to 858 and from 867 to 877

Saint Ignatius of Constantinople
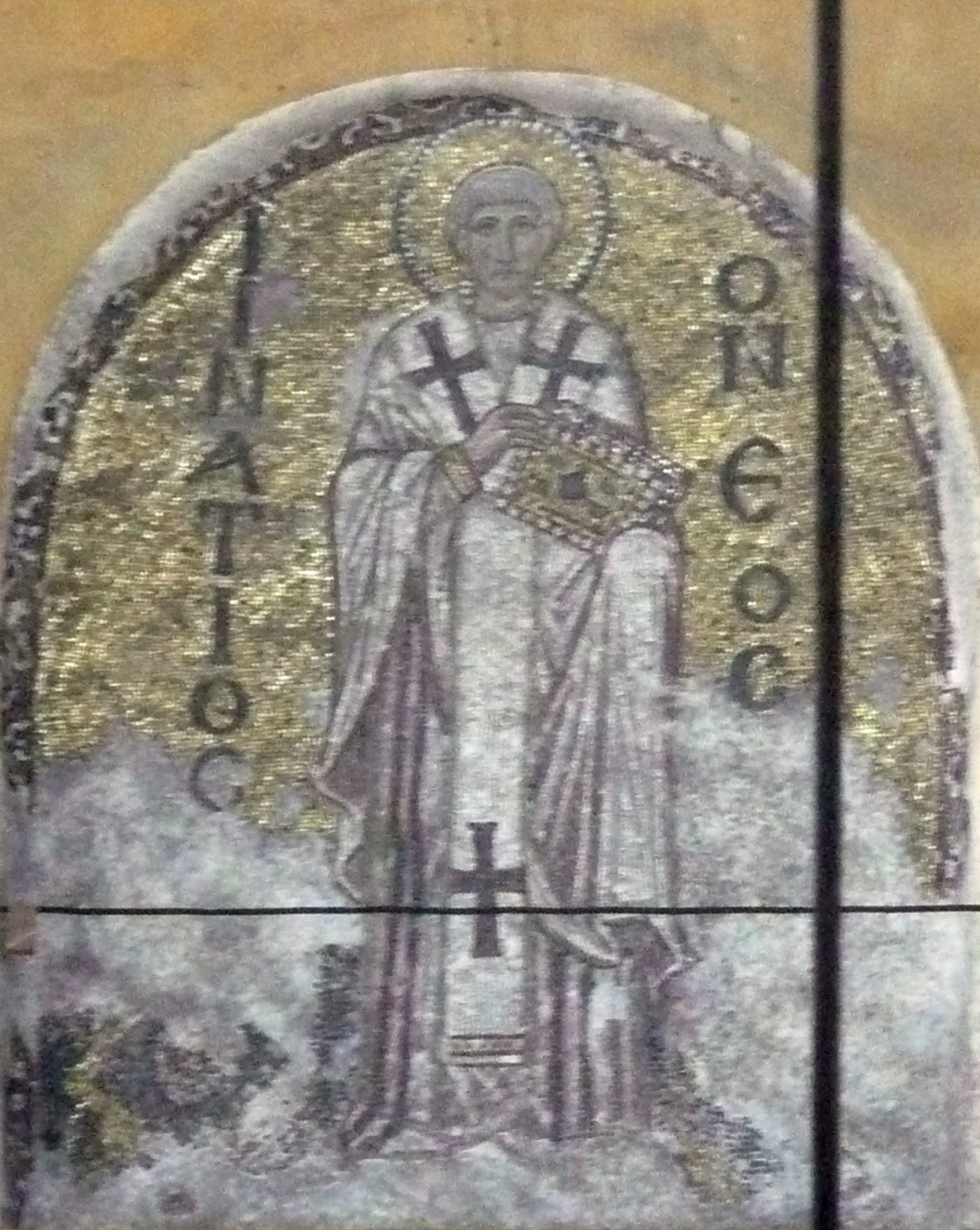
- Ignatius of Constantinople, Northern tympanon, Hagia Sophia, Istanbul

Ecumenical Patriarch of Constantinople
- Born: 798; Constantinople
- Died: 23 October 877 (aged 78–79); Constantinople
- Venerated in: Catholic Church; Eastern Orthodox Church
- Canonized: Pre-Congregation
- Feast: 23 October

Ignatius of Constantinople
- Ecumenical Patriarch of Constantinople
- Installed: 4 July 847, 23 November 867
- Term ended: 23 October 858, 23 October 877
- Predecessor: Methodius I of Constantinople; Photius I of Constantinople
- Successor: Photius I of Constantinople; Photius I of Constantinople

Personal details
- Born: Niketas Rangabe; 798
- Died: 23 October 877
- Denomination: Chalcedonian Christianity

Ignatius of Constantinople (Greek: Ἰγνάτιος; 798 – 23 October 877) was the Ecumenical Patriarch of Constantinople from 847 to 858 and from 867 to 877. Ignatius lived during a complex time for the Byzantine Empire. The Iconoclast Controversy was ongoing, Boris I of Bulgaria converted to Christianity in 864, and the Roman pontiffs repeatedly challenged the ecclesiastical jurisdiction of the Eastern Church in Bulgaria. As patriarch, Ignatius denounced iconoclasm, secured jurisdiction over Bulgaria for the Eastern Church, and played an important role in conflicts over papal supremacy.

== Context ==
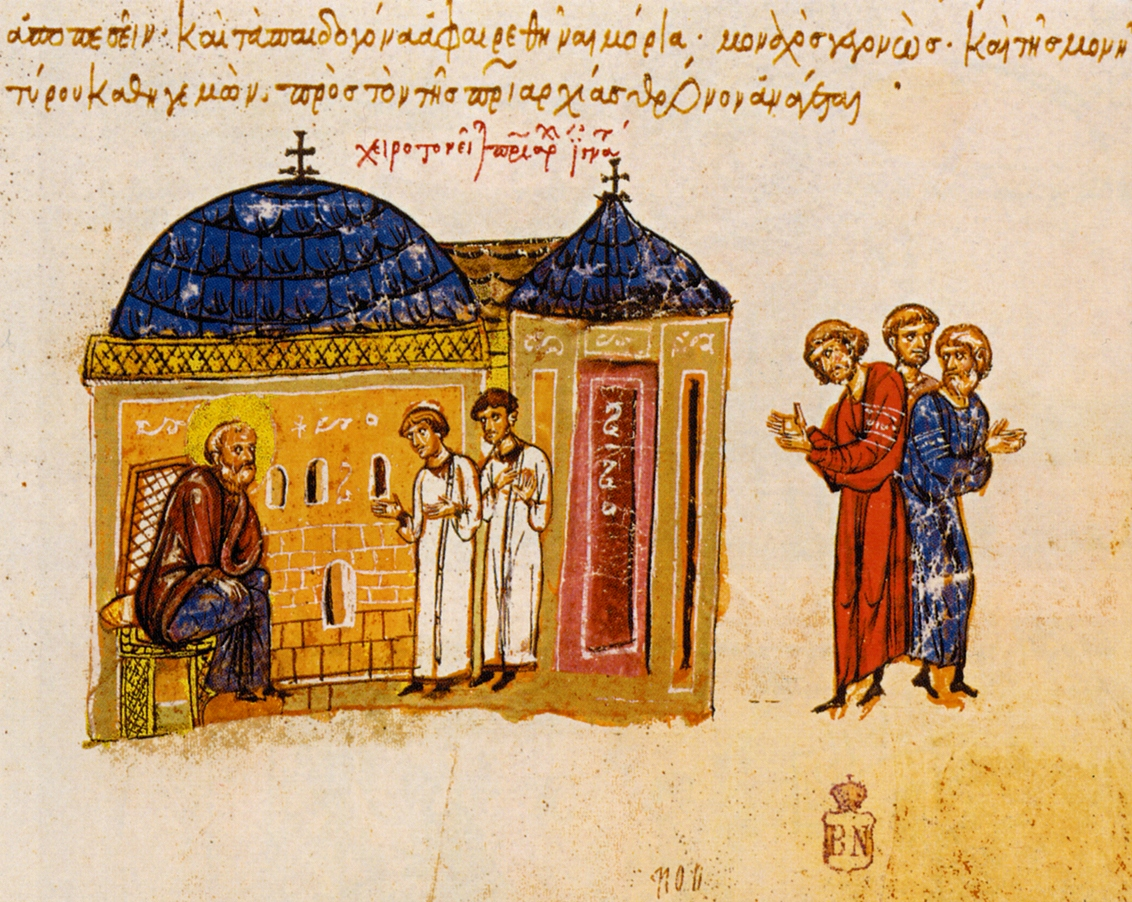
Ignatius is appointed patriarch by Empress Theodora, scene from the 12th century Madrid Skylitzes.

At the time Ignatius lived, relations remained tense between the Eastern and Western Churches. Constantinople was embroiled in several controversies. The Pope, as head of the Western Church, maintained that he had supreme and universal authority over both Churches, but the Eastern Church opposed his claim. Indeed, Photius I, who replaced Ignatius as patriarch when was deposed in 859, condemned the pope and the Western Church in 867 for adding the Filioque ("and the Son") to the Nicene Creed. The Eastern and Western churches also competed to convert the Slavs, and both Churches sought to dominate the Christianisation of Bulgaria. At that time, the Eastern Church faced internal struggles, too. Most notably, the Church had not yet resolved the Iconoclast Controversy. Although the seventh ecumenical council, also known as the Second Council of Nicaea, had decided in favor of icon veneration in 787, Iconoclasm continued.

== Birth and early life ==
Ignatius was born in 798 and died on 23 October 877. He was originally named Niketas, and was a son of the Emperor Michael I and Empress Prokopia. As a child, Niketas was appointed nominal commander of the new corps of imperial guards, the Hikanatoi. When he was fourteen, Emperor Leo V the Armenian had Niketas forcibly castrated, which made him ineligible to become emperor, and effectively imprisoned in a monastery after his father's deposition in 813. As a monk, he took the name Ignatius and eventually became abbot. He also founded three monasteries on the Princes' Islands, a favorite place for exiling tonsured members of the imperial house.

== Patriarchate ==
Theodora appointed Ignatius as Patriarch on 4 July 847 in part because he supported venerating icons. As patriarch, Ignatius became an important ally for Theodora in the midst of the Iconoclast Controversy. Choosing an iconodule as patriarch secured Theodora's power since she was more at risk of being overthrown by iconodules than by iconoclasts. Ignatius served as Patriarch of Constantinople from 4 July 847 to 23 October 858 and from 23 November 867 to his death on 23 October 877.

== Deposition and ascent of Photius ==
The imperial court's resentment of Ignatius began when he excommunicated a high ranking imperial court member, Bardas, for incest. Bardas exiled Empress Theodora, attempting to gain more power, but Ignatius refused to approve of this. Emperor Michael III, influenced by Bardas, removed Ignatius as patriarch and exiled him in 857. A synod was convened which deposed Ignatius on the basis of a canon which prohibited a bishop being appointed by a secular power. Photius, an associate of Bardas, was made patriarch on Christmas Day of 858.

A schism resulted from Photius I's election because many bishops saw Ignatius's exit as illegitimate. Ignatius had only a few supporters once Photius I became patriarch. Most agreed that Ignatius had legitimately resigned, but some of his supporters appealed to Rome for him. A synod of 170 bishops deposed and anathematised Ignatius, but the schism escalated when Pope Nicholas I stepped in. The Roman see thought itself to have universal jurisdiction over all bishops, but Constantinople did not believe that Rome had this right.

== Intervention of Pope Nicholas I and Pope Adrian II ==
Pope Nicholas I questioned Photius I's legitimate status as patriarch. Papal legates retried Ignatius in a synod in 861, which said that Photius I was the legitimate patriarch, but Nicholas I rejected that synod and held his own synod which condemned Photius I and declared Ignatius the legitimate patriarch. He excommunicated Photius I and declared all his ordinations invalid. Emperor Michael III rejected Nicholas I's synod and accepted the one that had approved Ignatius's deposition.

Photius I excommunicated Pope Nicholas I and all Latin Christians in a council in Constantinople in 867 for believing that the Holy Spirit proceeds from both the Father and the Son, as well as adding that belief (the Filioque) to the Nicene Creed in the West. Nicholas I died before hearing about the council, but his successor Pope Adrian II condemned it. The controversy over the Filioque played a key role in the eventual schism that would split the two Churches for over a thousand years.

In 867, Emperor Michael III was murdered and replaced by Basil I, his co-emperor. Basil I exiled Photius I and restored Ignatius as patriarch. Basil I effectively undid the last nine years of church history, restoring the Ignatian bishops and nullifying everything Photius I did, securing his political position as emperor. Pope Adrian II held a council in 869 which condemned Photius I, rejecting and burning the council of 867. The pope's council said that Photius I's ordinations were invalid and if the bishops wanted to be part of the council, they had to sign a document condemning Photius I and affirming the supremacy of Rome. A council was convened at Constantinople in 869 for the eastern bishops to review Pope Adrian II's decision. The council met, condemned Photius I, and reinstated Ignatius, but many eastern bishops did not show up and the papal supremacy canons were rejected.

== Securing Bulgaria for the East ==
The Christianisation of the Slavs created conflict between the Eastern and Western Churches as both vied for control of the new Bulgarian church. Ecclesiastical jurisdiction over Bulgaria meant political influence in the Khanate as well. Emperor Michael III attacked Bulgaria and caught Boris I, the Bulgar Knyaz, off guard. Boris I was forced to submit to the emperor and was baptised in 864, taking the Christian name of Micheal. At the Eighth Ecumenical Council held in 869 in Constantinople, the Bulgarians deferred to Constantinople rather than Rome, thereby confirming that the Bulgarian church submitted to Constantinople, not Rome. A papal letter to Ignatius threatened that he would not be reinstated if he interfered with Roman plans in Bulgaria, but he did not read the letter and chose an archbishop for Bulgaria. Rome still accepted the provisions of the council because it upheld the condemnation of Photius I.

== After death ==
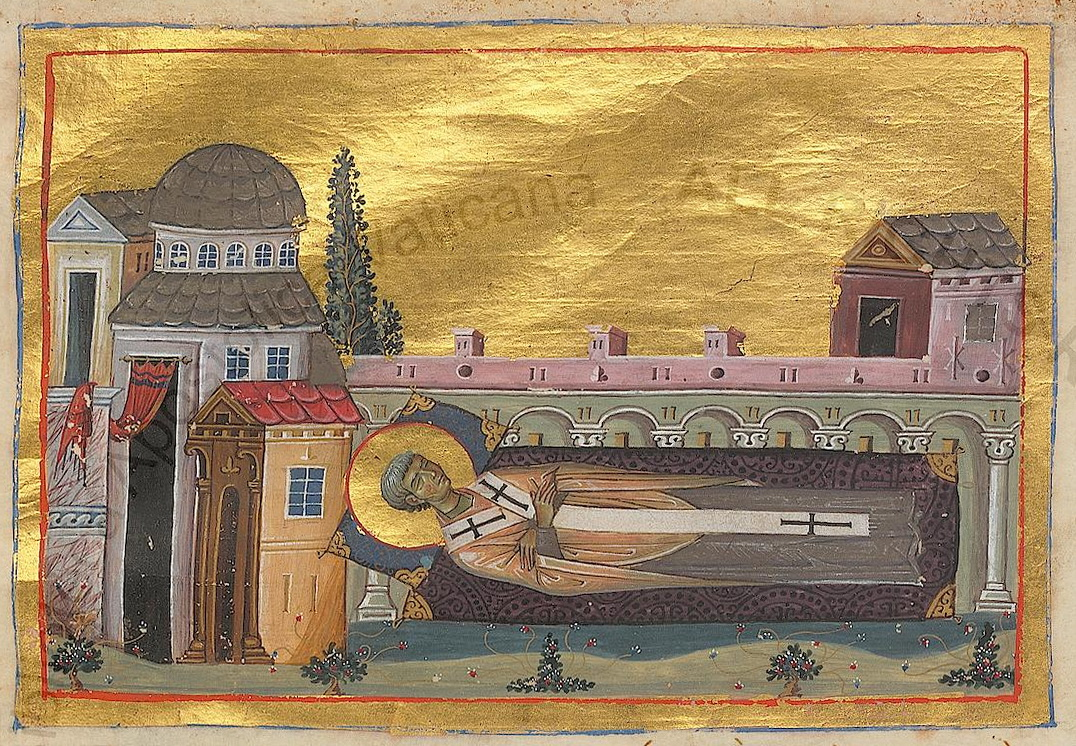
Painting showing the death of Ignatius from the Menologion of Basil II (c. 1000)

After Ignatius died in 877, Photius I became the Patriarch of Constantinople once again, since Ignatius named him as his successor. In the Catholic and Eastern Orthodox churches, he is venerated as a saint, with a feast day of 23 October.

== See also ==
- Council of Constantinople (861)
- Council of Constantinople (867)
- Council of Constantinople (869-870)
- Schism of 863

== Bibliography ==
- Carr, John C.; Fighting Emperors of Byzantium - 133–141, Pen and Sword Military an imprint of Pen and Sword Books, 2015.
- Chadwick, Henry; East and West - The Making of a Rift in the Church - From Apostolic Times until the Council of Florence, Oxford, Oxford University Press, 2003.
- Anthony Kaldellis, The New Roman Empire - A History of Byzantium, New York, Oxford University Press, 2024.
- Ostrogorsky, George (1956). "History of the Byzantine State". Oxford: Basil Blackwell.
- Peeters Publishers, Bondgenotenlaan, 2020.

Titles of Chalcedonian Christianity
Preceded by Methodius I	Ecumenical Patriarch of Constantinople; 847 – 858	Succeeded by Photius I
Preceded by Photius I	Ecumenical Patriarch of Constantinople; 867 – 877	Succeeded by Photius I (2)
