= Fourth Council of Constantinople (Catholic Church) =

8th ecumenical council of the Catholic Church (869–870 AD)

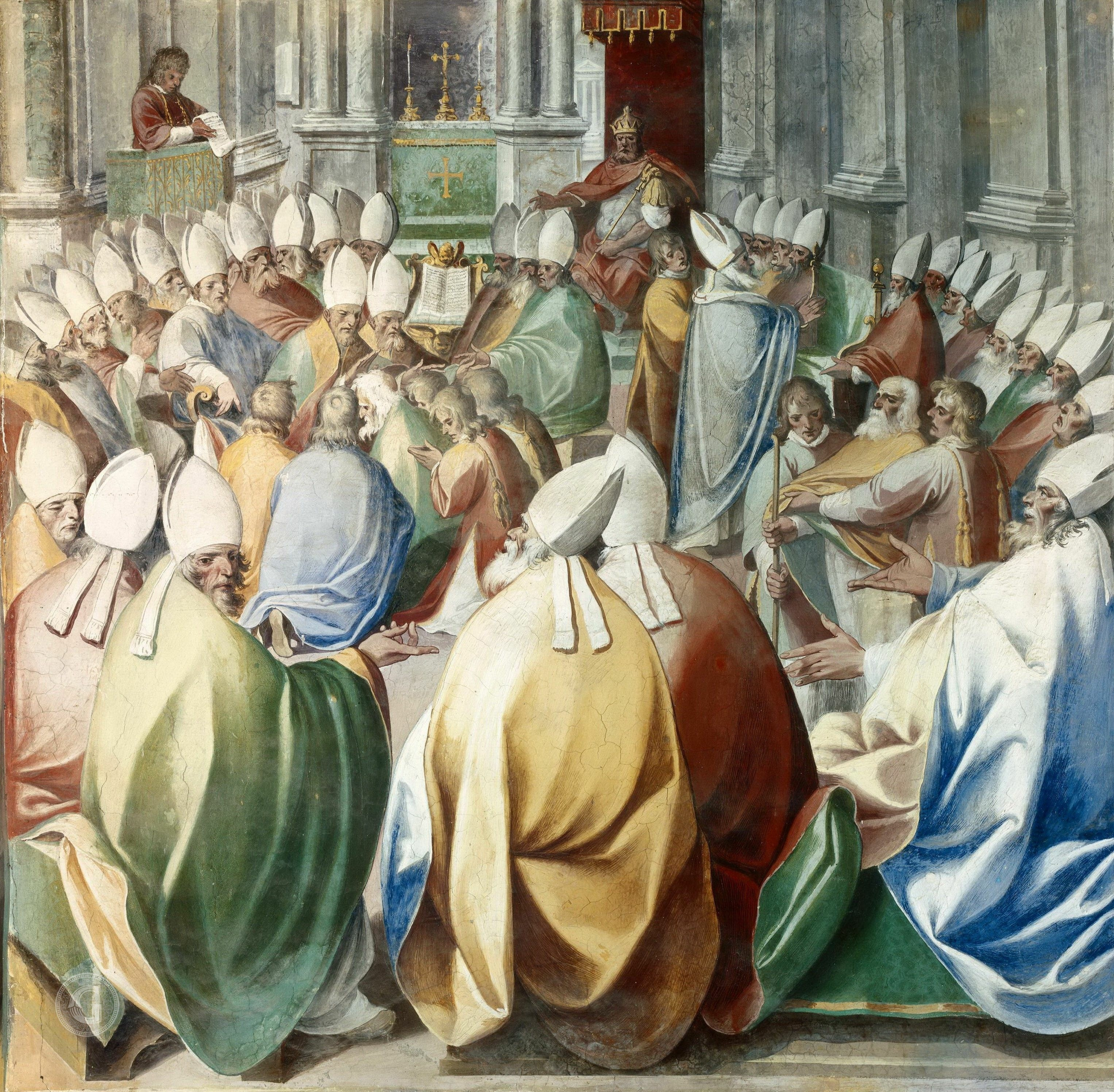
- Artistic rendition of the Fourth Council of Constantinople by Cesare Nebbia
- Date: 869–870
- Accepted by: Catholic Church
- Previous council: Second Council of Nicaea
- Next council: First Council of the Lateran
- Convoked by: Emperor Basil I and Pope Adrian II
- President: Papal legates
- Attendance: 20–25 bishops (first session), 102 bishops (last session)
- Topics: Photius's patriarchate
- Documents and statements: Deposition of Photius, 27 canons

The Fourth Council of Constantinople was the eighth ecumenical council of the Catholic Church held in Constantinople from 5 October 869, to 28 February 870. It was attended by over 103 bishops. In contrast, the pro-Photian council of 879–80 was attended by 383 bishops. The Council met in ten sessions from October 869 to February 870 and issued 27 canons.

The council was called by Emperor Basil I the Macedonian, with the support of Pope Hadrian II. It deposed and anathematized Photius, a layman who had been appointed as Patriarch of Constantinople, and reinstated his predecessor Ignatius.

The Council also reaffirmed the decisions of the Second Council of Nicaea in support of icons and holy images and required the image of Christ to have veneration equal with that of the gospel book. It was a reaction against the local Council of Constantinople (867) that excommunicated Pope Nicholas I and declared him anathema.

A later council, the Eastern Orthodox Fourth Council of Constantinople, was held after Photios had been reinstated on the order of the emperor. Today, the Catholic Church recognizes the council in 869–870 as "Constantinople IV", while the Eastern Orthodox Churches recognize the councils in 879–880 as "Constantinople IV" and revere Photios as a saint.

Whether and how far the Greek Fourth Council of Constantinople was confirmed by Pope John VIII is a matter of dispute. Some argue that he did accept it, in his Letters to the Emperors Basil I, Leo VI and Alexander, which were read in the second session of the 879/80 council, his so-called letter to Photios and his Commonitorium. Francis Dvornik has argued that subsequent popes accepted the council of 879 as binding, only choosing the council of 869–70 as ecumenical years later after the Great Schism due to issues with certain canons (namely the implicit condemnation of the filioque). Siecienski disagrees with Dvornik's assessment. The previous seven ecumenical councils are recognized as ecumenical and authoritative by both Eastern Orthodox and Catholic Christians.

== Background ==
With the coronation of Charlemagne by Pope Leo III in 800, the papacy had acquired a new protector in the West. This freed the pontiffs to some degree from the power of the emperor in Constantinople but it also led to a schism, because the emperors and patriarchs of Constantinople interpreted themselves as the true descendants of the Roman Empire.

After the Byzantine emperor summarily dismissed St. Ignatius of Constantinople as patriarch of that city, Pope Nicholas I refused to recognize his successor Patriarch Photios I of Constantinople. Photios did not at this stage raise the Filioque issue. The Council condemned Photios and defrocked his supporters in the clergy.

== Photian schism ==
In 858, Photius, a noble layman from a local family, was appointed Patriarch of Constantinople, the most senior episcopal position save only that of Rome. Emperor Michael III had deposed the previous patriarch, Ignatius. Ignatius refused to abdicate, setting up a power struggle between the Emperor and Pope Nicholas I. The 869–870 Council condemned Photius and deposed him as patriarch and reinstated his predecessor Ignatius. It also ranked Constantinople before the other three Eastern patriarchates of Alexandria, Antioch and Jerusalem.

== Support for icons and holy images ==
One of the key elements of the Council was the reaffirmation of the decisions of the Second Council of Nicaea in support of icons and holy images. The council thus helped stamp out any remaining embers of Byzantine iconoclasm. Specifically, its third Canon required the image of Christ to have veneration equal with that of the gospel book:

We decree that the sacred image of our Lord Jesus Christ, the liberator and Savior of all people, must be venerated with the same honor as is given the book of the holy Gospels. For as through the language of the words contained in this book all can reach salvation, so, due to the action which these images exercise by their colors, all wise and simple alike, can derive profit from them. For what speech conveys in words, pictures announce and bring out in colors.

The council also encouraged the veneration of the images of the Virgin Mary, angels and saints:

If anyone does not venerate the image of Christ our Lord, let him be deprived of seeing him in glory at his second coming. The image of his all pure Mother and the images of the holy angels as well as the images of all the saints are equally the object of our homage and veneration.

== Lay people ==
Canon 22 set out to restrict the influence of lay people in ecclesiastical matters, although it acknowledged that on invitation, a lay person could contribute to ecclesiastical debate. A statement by Basil to the Council was quoted by Pope Gregory XVI in his letter to the Swiss clergy, Commissum divinitus on 17 May 1835. Gregory was responding to a Swiss initiative, the Baden Articles, which gave some of the Swiss cantons authority over church matters including marriage. Gregory quoted Basil's speech:

What more can I say about you lay people? I have nothing else to say except that it is not permitted for you to speak concerning ecclesiastical matters. It is the duty of patriarchs, popes, and priests, to whom the duty of governing has been entrusted, to investigate and study these matters. They have the power of binding and loosing and of sanctifying. They are the ones who have the ecclesiastical and heavenly keys, not those who must be fed, sanctified, bound, and loosed.

== Sources ==
- Cross, F. L. (ed.). The Oxford Dictionary of the Christian Church, New York: Oxford University Press (2005).
- Dvornik, Francis (1948). The Photian Schism: History and Legend. Cambridge, UK: Cambridge University Press.
- Ostrogorsky, George (1956). History of the Byzantine State. Oxford: Basil Blackwell.
- Siecienski, Anthony Edward (2010). The Filioque: History of a Doctrinal Controversy. Oxford University Press. ISBN 978-0-19-537204-5.
- "Acts of the 869 Fourth Council of Constantinople". 5 October 869.
