= Francis Dvornik =

Czech historian (1893–1975)

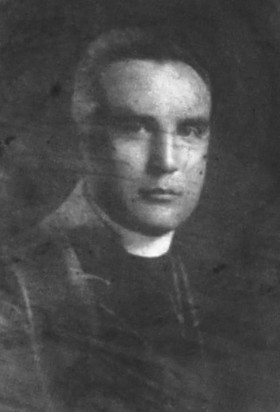
- Born: František Dvorník; 14 August 1893; Chomýž, Austria-Hungary
- Died: 4 November 1975 (aged 82); Chomýž, Czechoslovakia

Academic background
- Thesis: Les Slaves, Byzance et Rome (1926)

Academic work
- Institutions: Charles University; Collège de France; University of Cambridge; Harvard University
- Notable works: Les legendes de Constantin et de Methode vues de Byzan (1933), The Slavs: Their Early History and Civilization (1956), Byzantine Missions among the Slavs (1970)

Francis Dvornik (Czech: František Dvorník; 14 August 1893 – 4 November 1975) was a Czech academic medievalist, byzantinist, slavist and Catholic priest. He was one of the leading 20th century authorities on Slavic and Byzantine history and matters related to the churches of Rome and Constantinople. For almost three decades, he was a professor of Byzantine history at the Dumbarton Oaks Center for Byzantine Studies of Harvard University.

== Career ==
Dvornik was born on 14 August 1893 in Chomýž, Moravia, Austria-Hungary (today the Czech Republic), to Francis Dvornik and Frances Tomečková. Already in his childhood years was showing "outstanding" achievements in elementary school, because of which in 1904 was sent to the local archiepiscopal minor seminary.

In June 1912 completed classical gymnasium with high scores, and between 1912 and 1920, he studied and/or graduated at the Archdiocesan School in Kroměříž, the Faculty of Theology of the University of Olomouc, and the Charles University in Prague (studying Slavic studies under Lubor Niederle and Josef Peisker), receiving his D.D. in theology in 1920 from Olomouc. In the meantime in 1916 he was ordained a Roman Catholic priest. Olomouc's University professor and dean Jan Hejčl desired to be succeeded one day by Dvornik, but his negative experience as an assistant pastor in Germany (1917-1919), and rising political and anti-Catholic Away from Rome! movement, impacted a change in his career path.

In summer 1920, went to study several specialties at the University of Paris, graduating Sciences Po in 1923, and PhD in humanities from Sorbonne University in 1926, influenced by Charles Diehl to become a Byzantist. Then he returned to home country, became an ecclesiastical history professor at Charles University in Prague, and helped founding the Institute of Slavic Studies and the academic journal Byzantinoslavica.

During the World War II period, he emigrated to France and Great Britain, where became Schlumherger Lecturer at the Collège de France in Paris, and was appointed Birbeck Lecturer at Cambridge University in 1946. In England he received honorary degree of Doctor of Letters, in 1947 became corresponding fellow of the Royal Society and honorary membership at the Royal Historical Society.

Despite assured academic career in England, he accepted the invitation to join the Institute of Byzantine Studies at the Dumbarton Oaks Center of Harvard University in the United States. Dvornik became most known for his activity as a professor there, first as visiting in 1948, and then of resident full professor of Byzantine history since 1949 until 1964. In 1951 started to conduct his own course "Early Slavic History and Civilization" (which lectures expanded and published as a book). In 1952 he was elected membership in the American Academy of Arts and Sciences (member since 1955) and corresponding fellow of the Medieval Academy of America (or 1954). He also had a membership in the Royal Academy of Science, Letters and Fine Arts of Belgium, Czech Academy of Sciences, and Romanian Academy of Sciences. He was also named Knight of the French Legion of Honour, and in memoriam received Order of Tomáš Garrigue Masaryk (class III).

Participating in nine Byzantine Studies symposia, he directed in 1952 the "Byzantium and the Slavs" and in 1964 with Roman Jakobson "The Byzantine Mission to the Slavs: St. Cyril and St. Methodius". Since 1964 he has continued his research and teaching as Professor Emeritus at Dumbarton Oaks. By then, several academic societies, associations and universities in the US awarded him honorary degrees and awards.

He died on 4 November 1975 in his home during a visit from the United States. At his funeral came two bishops and 120 priests, and many academics and scholars paid homage to him.

== Legacy ==
Dvornik has been credited to have "changed our views of the history of Byzantium, of the Slavs and of the Church of Rome; provided large syntheses of Slavic civilization from its beginnings to the early modern period; and traced the development of Byzantine political ideas from their beginnings in the ancient Orient to their reflections in post-Byzantine Eastern Europe". Dumbarton Oaks has called him "one of the leading twentieth-century experts on Slavic and Byzantine history and on relations between the churches of Rome and Constantinople". When published two volumes on the history of Slavic nations (1956, 1962), was deemed "that no one was better qualified to present so wide a synthesis of such a complex history". He also contributed to research that helped rehabilitate, from a Catholic standpoint, the Byzantine patriarch and writer, Photios I of Constantinople. Jan N. Bremmer considered that the modern use of word "iconoclasm" and study of Byzantine history from an iconoclastic viewpoint in Anglosphere began and was influenced by work of Dvornik and Ernst Kitzinger. For all those achievements, Dvornik in 1972 received Award for Distinguished Contributions to Slavic Studies by American Association for the Advancement of Slavic Studies.

Dvornik was hailed for his "erudition", "intelligence, ability to view history in large interconnected units, and sheer passion for writing". Sirarpie Der Nersessian noted that at the Dumbarton Oaks "from the very beginning his unbiased attitude in intellectual matters as well as in personal relations, his loyalty, his kindliness, and his genial personality won the esteem and affection of his colleagues and of the younger Fellows, as well as of the members of the Staff. His broad outlook, his judgement and wise counsels have been of invaluable assistance ... and of major importance has been his role in the development of its Library".

== Bibliography ==
Dvornik is the author of 18 books and monographs, of which several have become classics in the fields of Byzantine and Slavic studies. His thesis and first book Les Slaves, Byzance et Rome au IXe siècle (1926 on 360 pages, engl. The Slavs, Byzantium and Rome in the Ninth Century), and The Photion Schism (1948), both received an award by the French Academy. The Les Légendes de Constantin et de Méthode: vues de Byzance (1933) for "once and forever" established the reliability and authenticity of the historical work Vita Constantini slavica. For The Idea of Apostolicity and the Legend of the Apostle Andrew (1958) received Haskins Medal in 1960. The Origins of Intelligence Services (1974) was first and for many years only work about the topic. He was one of chosen experts to make contribution in 1962 commentary edition of Constantine VII's De Administrando Imperio (ed. Gyula Moravcsik and transl. Romilly Jenkins in 1949), specifically on the chapters about South Slavs, Dvornik's contribution was described as "gems of synthesis and compression ... particularly detailed and useful commentary ... constitute in effect a treatise on early Slavic history".

He has also published more than 130 articles and 60 reviews in scholarly publications throughout the world. In 1954 Harvard University Press published a festschrift, a collection of Essays Dedicated to F. Dvornik on the Occasion of his 60th Birthday (Harvard Slavic studies no. 2), while in 1973 the Dumbarton Oaks Papers 27th volume was dedicated to his 80th birthday.

=== Books ===
- Les Slaves, Byzance et Rome au IXe siècle. Travaux publiés par l'Institut d'études slaves no. 4. Paris: Champion, 1926. Reprinted 1970.
- La Vie de saint Grégoire le Décapolite et les Slaves macédoniens au IXe siècle. Travaux publiés par l'Institut d'études slaves no. 5. Paris: Champion, 1926.
- Zivot Svatého Václava k tisícímu výrocí jeho mucednické smrti. Prague, 1929.

In French as Saint Venceslas, Duc de Bohême, martyr. Prague: [Comité du Millénaire de St. Venceslas], 1929.
In English as The Life of Saint Wenceslas. Prague: [State printing office], 1929.

- Les Légendes de Constantin et de Méthode: vues de Byzance. Recueil pour l'étude des relations byzantino-slaves, Supplemental. Prague: Commissionnaire "Orbis", 1933. Second edition Hattiesburg: Academic International, 1969.
- The Photian Schism: History and Legend. Cambridge University Press, 1948. Reprinted 1970.

In French as Le Schisme de Photius: histoire et légende. Unam sanctam 19. Paris: Éditions du Cerf, 1950. With a preface by Yves Congar.

- The Making of Central and Eastern Europe. London: Polish Research Centre, 1949. Second edition Gulf Breeze, Fla.: Academic International Press, 1974.

In Czech: Zrod střední a východní Evropy: mezi Byzancí a Římem, translated by Petr Slunéčko. Edice Obzor no. 21. Prague: Prostor, 1999. Second edition 2008.

- The Slavs: Their Early History and Civilization. Boston: American Academy of Arts and Sciences, 1956. Reprinted 1959.

In Italian: Gli Slavi: storia e civiltà dalle origini al secolo XIII. Collana di studi sull'Europa orientale 13. Padua: Liviana, 1974.

- The Idea of Apostolicity in Byzantium and the Legend of the Apostle Andrew. Dumbarton Oaks Studies 4. Cambridge, Mass.: Harvard University Press, 1958.
- The Ecumenical Councils. Twentieth Century Encyclopedia of Catholicism 82. New York: Hawthorn Books, 1961.

In the United Kingdom as The General Councils of the Church. Faith and Fact Books 83. London: Burns & Oates, 1961.

- The Slavs in European History and Civilization. New Brunswick, N.J.: Rutgers University Press, 1962.

In Italian, Gli Slavi nella storia e nella civiltà europea, 2 vol., Bari, edizioni Dedalo, 1968. Russian edition, Moscow, 2001.

- Byzance et la primauté romaine. Unam Sanctam 49. Paris: Éditions du Cerf, 1964.

In English: Byzantium and the Roman Primacy. New York: Fordham University Press, 1966. Corrected edition 1979.

- Early Christian and Byzantine Political Philosophy. Dumbarton Oaks Studies 9. Washington: Dumbarton Oaks Center for Byzantine Studies, 1966. 2 vol.
- Svatý Vojtěch: druhý pražský biskup. Sůl země no. 1. Řím: Křesťanská akademie, 1967.
- Svatý Václav: dědic České země. Sůl země no. 3. Řím: Křesťanská akademie, 1968.
- Les Slaves: histoire et civilisation : de l'Antiquité aux débuts de l'époque contemporaine. translated by Danielle Pavlevski with the collaboration of Maroussia Chpolyansky. Paris: Seuil, 1970. French combination of The Slavs (Boston, 1956) and The Slavs in European History and Civilisation (New Brunswick, 1962).
- Byzantine Missions among the Slavs. Rutgers Byzantine Series. New Brunswick, N.J.: Rutgers University Press, 1970.
- Photian and Byzantine Ecclesiastical Studies. Collected Studies 32. Variorum collected studies series. London: Variorum Reprints, 1974.
- Origins of Intelligence Services: The Ancient Near East, Persia, Greece, Rome, Byzantium, the Arab Muslim Empires, the Mongol Empire, China, Muscovy. New Brunswick, N.J.: Rutgers University Press, 1974.

=== Lectures and articles ===
- "Le premier schisme de Photios" in Actes du IVe Congrés international des études Byzantines. Bulletin de l'institut archéologique bulgare, IX, 1935.
- "L'oecuménicité du huitième concile (869-870) dans la tradition occidentale du moyen âge". Bulletins de la classe des lettres et des Sciences Morales et Politiques, 5th ser., vol. 24 (1938), pp. 445–487.
- "The First Wave of the 'Drang nach Osten'". Cambridge Historical Journal 7:3 (1943), pp. 129–145.
- "National Churches and the Church Universal". Eastern Churches Quarterly 5 (1945).
- "The Study of Church History and Christian Reunion". Eastern Churches Quarterly 6 (1945).
- "The Diffusion of Greek Culture. 6, Byzantium and the North". Geographical Magazine 19 (1946), pp. 295–304.
- "The Kiev State and Its Relations with Western Europe". Transactions of the Royal Historical Society (1947), pp. 27–46. Reprinted in Essays in Medieval History, selected from the Transactions of the Royal Historical Society on the occasion of its centenary, edited by R. W. Southern. London: Macmillan, 1968.
- "The Diffusion of Greek Culture. 9, Byzantine Influences in Russia". Geographical Magazine 20 (1947), pp. 29–40.
- "The Photian Schism in Western and Eastern Tradition". The Kornes Lecture, given at King's College, University of London May 8, 1947. Printed in The Review of Politics 10:3 (1948), pp. 310–331.
- "Byzance, les Slaves et les Francs". Russie et Chrétienté 3-4 (1949).
- "Photius et la réorganisation de l'académie patriarchale". Mélanges Paul Peeters, vol. 2 (Analecta Bollandiana 68). Brussels: Société des Bollandistes, 1950, pp. 108–125.
- "Pope Gelasius and Emperor Anastasius I". Byzantinische Zeitschrift 44 (1951), pp. 111–116.
- "Emperors, Popes, and General Councils", Dumbarton Oaks Papers 6 (1951), pp. 1–23.
- "The Patriarch Photius and Iconoclasm", Dumbarton Oaks Papers 7 (1953), pp. 67–97.
- "Les Bénédictins et la christianisation de la Russie", in 1054-1954: L'Église et les églises. Neuf siècles de douloureuse séparation entre l'Orient et l'Occident. Études et travaux sur l'unité chrétienne offerts à Dom Lambert Beauduin. Chevetogne: Éditions de Chevetogne, 1954, pp. 323–349.
- "The Mediaeval Cultural Heritage of the Mid-European Area". Review of Politics 18:4 (1956), pp. 487–507. ("Based on a lecture given ... at Wayne University Detroit, March 17, 1954.")
- "Byzantine Political Ideas in Kievan Russia], Dumbarton Oaks Papers 9/10 (1956), pp. 73–121.
- "The Byzantine Church and the Immaculate Conception", in The Dogma of the Immaculate Conception, edited by Edward D. O'Connor. Notre Dame, Ind.: University of Notre Dame Press, 1958, pp. 87–112.
- "Die Benediktiner und die Christianisierung Russlands". Benediktinische Monatschrift 35:4 (1959), pp. 292–310.
- "Patriarch Photius: Scholar and Statesman", Classical Folia 13 (1959), pp. 3–18; 14 (1960), pp. 2–22.
- "The role of Bohemia and St. Adalbert in the spread of Christianity in Poland", The Polish Review 5:4 (1960), pp. 15–28.
- "The Patriarch Photius and Roman Primacy". Chicago Studies (1963), pp. 94–107.
- "The Slavs between East and West". Marquette University Slavic Institute Papers no. 19. Milwaukee, Wis.: Marquette University, Slavic Institute, 1964.
- "Die Bedeutung der Brüder Cyrill und Method für die Slaven- und Kirchengeschichte: Festvortrag", in Prolegomena ad Acta Congressus historiae Slavicae Salisburgensis in memoriam SS. Cyrilli et Methodii anno 1963 celebrati. Wiesbaden: Otto Harrassowitz, 1964, pp. 17–32.
- "The Significance of the Missions of Cyril and Methodius". Slavic Review 23:2 (1964), pp. 195–211.
- "SS. Cyrille et Méthode et la Christianisation des Slaves". Slavic and East-European Studies 8 (1963), pp. 132–152.
- "Two Problems in the History of St. Constantine-Cyril", in Festschrift für Dmitrij Tschizewskij zum 70. Geburtstag. Munich: Wilhelm Fink Verlag, 1966, pp. 181–186.
- "Patriarch Ignatius and Caesar Bardas". Byzantinoslavica 27:1 (1966), pp. 7–22.
- "The Embassies of Constantine-Cyril and Photius to the Arabs", in To Honor Roman Jakobson: Essays on the Occasion of his Seventieth Birthday. The Hague: Mouton, 1967, pp. 569–576.
- "The Byzantine Mission to Moravia", in Czechoslovakia Past and Present, edited by Mila Rechcigl. Vol. 2. Essays on the arts and sciences. Mouton, [1968?], pp. 1107–1121.
- "Missions of the Greek and Western Churches in the East during the Middle Ages". Lecture at the 13th International Congress of Historical Sciences, Moscow, 1970.
- "Photius, Nicholas I and Hadrian II", Byzantinoslavica 34:1 (1973), pp. 33–50.
