= Religious images in Christian theology =

Icons and symbols in Christianity

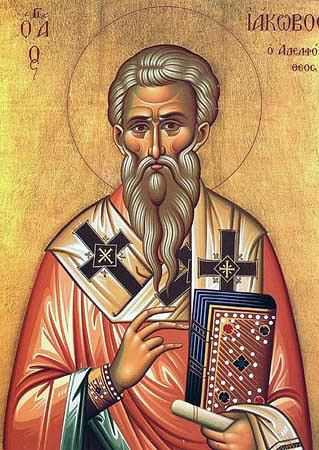
An icon depicting James the Just, whose judgment was adopted in the Apostolic Decree of Acts 15:19–29, c. 50 AD: "...we should write to them [Gentiles] to abstain only from things polluted by idols and from fornication and from whatever has been strangled and from blood..." (NRSV)

Religious images in Christian theology have a role within the liturgical and devotional life of adherents of certain Christian denominations. The use of religious images has often been a contentious issue in Christian history. Concern over idolatry is the driving force behind the various traditions of aniconism in Christianity.

In the early Church, Christians used the Ichthys (fish) symbol to identify Christian places of worship and Christian homes. The Synod of Elvira (306 AD - 312 AD) "prohibited the exhibition of images in churches". However, since the 3rd century AD, images have been used within Christian worship within parts of Christendom, although some ancient Churches, such as the Church of the East, have apparently long traditions of not using images. However, there is also both literary and archaeological evidence for the early presence of images in the Church of the East tradition.

Certain periods of Christian history have seen supporters of aniconism in Christianity, first with the movement of Byzantine Iconoclasm, in which Eastern Orthodox and Byzantine Emperors Michael II, as well as Theophilos, "banned veneration of icons and actively persecuted supporters of icons." Later, during the Iconoclastic Fury, Calvinists removed statues and sacred art from churches that adopted the Reformed faith.

The Church Father John of Damascus argued for the exhibition of religious iconography (most notably in his work, “Three Treatises on the Divine Images”), that, “God's taking on human form sanctified the human image, noting that the humanity of Christ formed an image of God; therefore, artists could use human images to depict the incarnate Word as well as human saints." As such, religious imagery today, in the form of statues, is most identified with the Roman Catholic and Lutheran traditions. Two dimensional icons are used extensively, and are most often associated with parts of Eastern Christianity, although they are also used by Roman Catholics, Lutherans, and, increasingly, Anglicans. Since the 1800s, devotional art has become very common in Christian homes, both Protestant and Catholic, often including wall crosses, embroidered verses from the Christian Bible, as well as imagery of Jesus. In Western Christianity, it is common for believers to have a home altar, while dwelling places belonging to communicants of the Eastern Christian Churches often have an icon corner.

A cult image is a human-made object that is venerated or worshipped for the deity, person or spirit that it embodies or represents. It is also controversially and pejoratively used by some Protestants, particularly certain Anabaptist and Reformed Christians, to describe the Eastern Orthodox (and, to a lesser extent, Catholic) practice of worshipping God through the use of icons, a charge which these Christians reject. In a similarly controversial sense, it is also used by these Protestants to pejoratively describe various Catholic and Eastern Orthodox devotional practices, such the Catholic use of scapulars and the common veneration of statues and flat images of the Virgin Mary and other saints, which Catholics and Eastern Orthodox do not consider idolatry.

== Origins within the Old Testament ==
Idolatry is prohibited by many verses in the Old Testament, but there is no one section that clearly defines idolatry. Rather there are a number of commandments on this subject spread through the books of the Hebrew Bible, some of which were written in different historical eras, in response to different issues.

The Israelites used various images in connection with their worship, including carved cherubim on the Ark of the Covenant (Exodus 25:18–22) which God instructed Moses to make, and the embroidered figures of cherubim on the curtain which separated the Holy of Holies in the Tabernacle tent (Exodus 26:31). Similarly, the Nehushtan, which God commanded Moses to make and lift high to cure any Israelites who looked at it of snakebites, is God-ordained use of an image. However, as part of a later religious reform Hezekiah destroyed the Serpent, which the Hebrew people had been burning incense to (2 Kings 18:4).

== New Testament ==
Judaism's animosity towards what they perceived as idolatry was inherited by Jewish Christianity. Although Jesus discussed the Mosaic Law in the Sermon on the Mount, he does not speak of issues regarding the meaning of the commandment against idolatry. His teachings, however, uphold that worship should be directed to God alone (Matthew 4:10 which is itself a quote of Deuteronomy 6:13, see also Shema in Christianity, Great Commandment, and Ministry of Jesus).

The Pauline Epistles contain several admonitions to "flee from idolatry" (1 Cor 5:11, 6:9–10, 10:7, 10:14, Gal 5:19–21, Eph 5:5, Col 3:5) A major controversy among Early Christians concerned whether it was permissible to eat meat that had been offered in pagan worship. Paul of Tarsus, who agreed to the Apostolic Decree, also wrote that it was permitted to do so, as long as a blessing was pronounced over it, and provided that scandal was not caused by it. However, he said that the gods worshiped in idolatry were in his belief demons, and that any act of direct participation in their worship remained forbidden (1 Corinthians 10:14-22). See also the Law of Christ.

The New Testament also uses the term "idolatry" to refer to worship like passion for things such as wealth, as in Colossians 3:5, "Put to death, therefore, whatever belongs to your earthly nature: sexual immorality, impurity, lust, evil desires and greed which is idolatry." Some Christian theologians see the absolutization of an idea as idolatrous. Therefore, undue focus on particular features of Christianity to the exclusion of others would constitute idolatry.

The New Testament does contain the rudiments of an argument which provides a basis for religious images or icons. Jesus was visible, and orthodox Christian doctrine maintains that Jesus is YHWH incarnate. In the Gospel of John, Jesus stated that because his disciples had seen him, they had seen God the Father (Gospel of John 14:7-9). Paul of Tarsus referred to Jesus as the "image of the invisible God" (Colossians 1:15). Theologians such as John of Damascus argued that the connection between Jesus' incarnation and the use of images is so strong that to reject or prohibit the use of images is tantamount to denying the Incarnation of Jesus.

Early Christianity grew in a society where religious images, usually in the form of statues, both large ones in temples and small ones such as lares and penates in the home, were a prominent feature of traditional pagan religions, such as traditional Ancient Roman religion, Ancient Greek religion and other forms of Eastern paganism. Many writings by Church Fathers contain strong denunciations of these practices, which seem to have included outright idol-worship. Statues on secular buildings, however, could serve as expression of secular power in various periods of Christianity, without implications of idol-worship.

== The use of icons and symbols in Christian worship ==
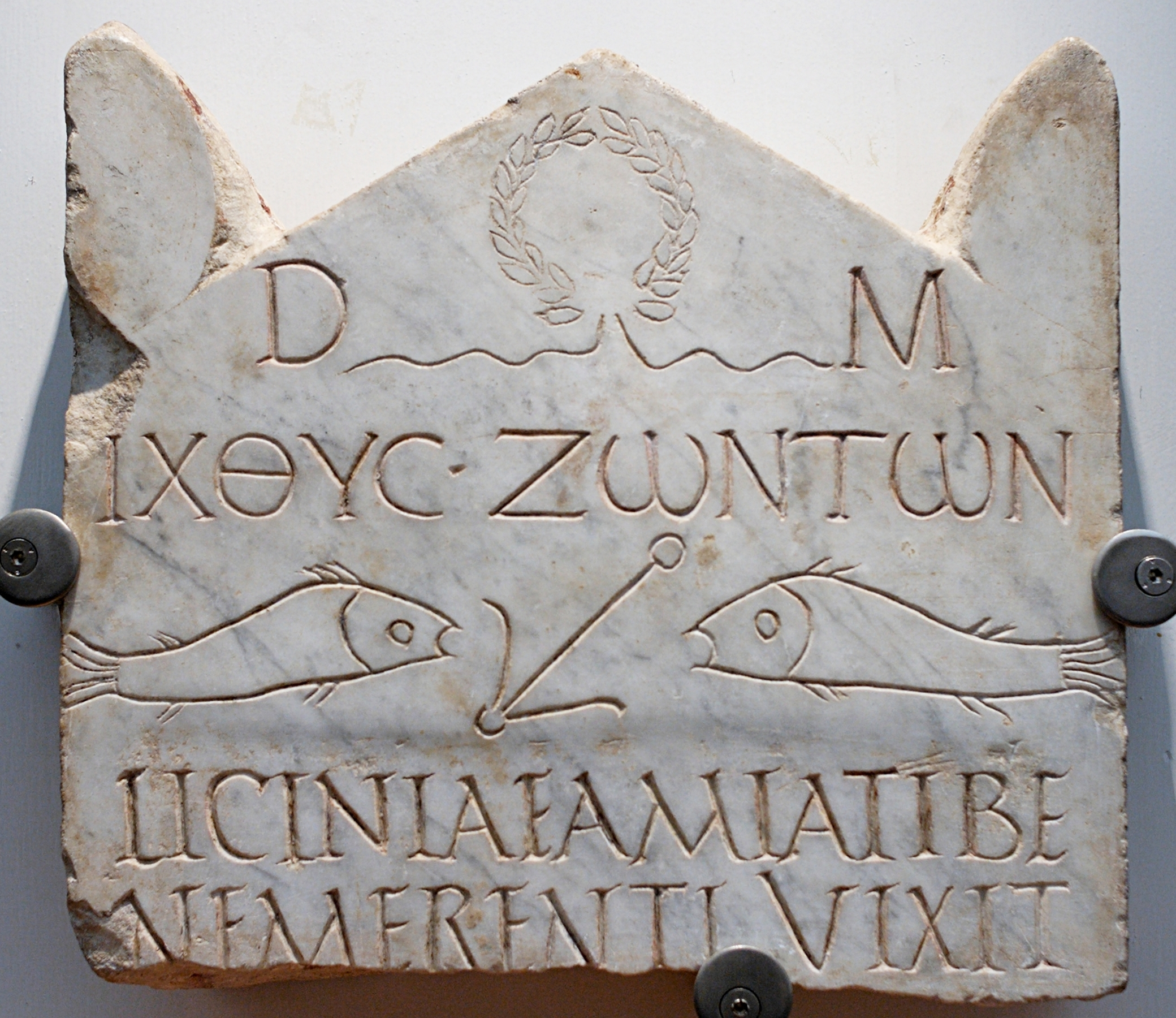
Funerary stele with the inscription ΙΧΘΥϹ ΖΩΝΤΩΝ ("fish of the living"), early 3rd century, National Roman Museum.

Periods of aniconism have characterized various points of Christian history; early Christianity was largely aniconic, with Church Fathers Tertullian and Clement of Alexandria regarding the Ten Commandments to be binding on Christians. Early Christian apologists argued that God was beyond representation "and insisted that material things, unlike divine beings, were subject to disintegration, rust and decay." Marcus Minucius Felix stated that Christians lacked images "because Christians believe in and worship an invisible God." Aniconism was notable during the controversy of the Byzantine iconoclasm of the eighth century, and in the 16th century, when Calvinism rejected all images in churches, and this practice continues today in conservative Reformed (Calvinist) churches, as well as in Anabaptist Christianity. The Catholic Church and the Lutheran Church defend the use of sacred images in churches, shrines, and homes.

Early Christian art that existed used symbolic and allegorical images, primarily. In the Catacombs of Rome, Jesus was represented indirectly by pictogram symbols such as the Ichthys (fish), peacock, Lamb of God, or an anchor (the Labarum or Chi-Rho was a later development). Later, personified symbols were used, including Jonah, whose three days in the belly of the whale pre-figured the interval between Christ's death and Resurrection, Daniel in the lion's den, or Orpheus charming the animals.

The image of "The Good Shepherd", a beardless youth in pastoral scenes collecting sheep, was the most common of these images, and was probably not understood as a portrait of the historical Jesus. The depiction of Jesus already from the 3rd century included images very similar to what became the traditional image of Jesus, with a longish face and long straight hair. As the Church increased in size and popularity, the need to educate illiterate converts led to the use of pictures which portrayed biblical stories, along with images of saints, angels, prophets, and the Cross (though only portrayed in a bejewelled, glorified state).

After the end of persecution, and the adoption of Christianity by Constantine, large churches were built and from the start decorated with elaborate images of Jesus and saints in mosaic. Small carved reliefs were also found on sarcophagi like the Sarcophagus of Junius Bassus. However large monumental sculpture of religious subjects was not produced, and in Byzantine art and Eastern Orthodox art it is avoided to the current day. It only reappeared in Carolingian art, among peoples who had no memory of pagan religious statues.

Paintings of Old Testament scenes are found in Jewish catacombs of the same period, and the heavily painted walls of Dura Europos Synagogue in Syria. Catholic and Orthodox historians affirm, on the basis of these archeological finds in the Catacombs, that the veneration of icons and relics had begun well before Constantine I.

Christian use of relics also dates to the catacombs, when Christians found themselves praying in the presence of the bodies of martyrs, sometimes using their tombs as altars for sharing the Eucharist, which was, and in Catholicism, Lutheranism and Eastern Orthodoxy is, the central act of Christian worship. Many stories of the earliest martyrs end with an account of how Christians would gather up the martyr's remains, to the extent possible, in order to retain the martyr's relics. This is shown in the written record of the martyrdom of Saint Polycarp, a personal disciple of Saint John the Apostle.

Significant periods of iconoclasm (deliberate destruction of icons) have occurred in the history of the Church, the first major outbreak being the Byzantine iconoclasm (730–787), motivated by a strictly literal interpretation of the second commandment and interaction with Muslims who have a very strict teachings against the creation of images. Iconoclasm was officially condemned by the Western and Eastern Churches at the Second Council of Nicaea in 787 AD (the Western Church was not represented, but approved the decrees later).

This decision was based on the arguments including that the biblical commandment forbidding images of God was because no-one had seen God. But, by the Incarnation of Jesus, who is God incarnate in visible matter, humankind has now seen God. It was therefore argued that they were not depicting the invisible God, but God as He appeared in the flesh.

The Libri Carolini are a response prepared in the court of Charlemagne, when under the mistaken impression that the Nicea Council had approved the worship as opposed to the veneration of images.

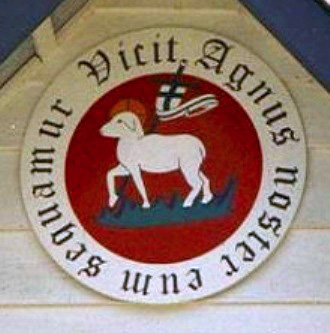
The emblem of the Moravian Church depicts an image of the Lamb of God (Agnus Dei in ecclesiastical Latin) with the flag of victory, surrounded by the Latin inscription: Vicit agnus noster, eum sequamur (English: "Our Lamb has conquered, let us follow Him").

=== Different understandings of the use of images ===
==== Catholicism ====
Catholics use images, such as the crucifix, the cross, in religious life and pray using depictions of saints. They also venerate images and liturgical objects by kissing, bowing, and making the sign of the cross. They point to the Old Testament patterns of worship followed by the Hebrew people as examples of how certain places and things used in worship may be treated with reverence or venerated, without worshiping them. The Ark of the Covenant was treated with great reverence and included images of cherubim on top of it (Exodus 25:18–22), and certain miracles were associated with it, yet this was not condemned as it was commissioned by the God of Israel Himself for the manifestation of His presence as well as physical manifestations of His Judgement and Glory.

Catholicism interprets the commandment not to make "any graven image, or any likeness of any thing that is in heaven above" to mean to not "bow down and worship" the image in and of itself nor a false god through the image. Catholic theology offers the following explanations of liturgical practice that features images, icons, statues, and the like:

- Gregory the Great wrote, "...it is one thing to adore an image, it is quite another thing to learn from the appearance of a picture what we must adore. What books are to those who can read, that is a picture to the ignorant who look at it; in a picture even the unlearned may see what example they should follow; in a picture they who know no letters may vet read. Hence, for barbarians especially a picture takes the place of a book."
- Thomas Aquinas said, (Summa, III, 25, 3), but "no reverence is shown to Christ's image, as a thing---for instance, carved or painted wood: because reverence is not due save to a rational creature". In the case of an image of a saint, the worship would not be latria but rather dulia, while the Blessed Virgin Mary receives hyperdulia. The worship of whatever type, latria, hyperdulia, or dulia, can be considered to go through the icon, image, or statue: "The honor given to an image reaches to the prototype" (St. John Damascene in Summa ³). Adrian Fortescue sums up Church teaching: "We should give to relics, crucifixes and holy pictures a relative honour, as they relate to Christ and his saints and are memorials of them. We do not pray to relics or images, for they can neither see nor hear nor help us."
- Both the literal worship of an inanimate object and latria, or sacrificial worship to something or someone that is not God, are forbidden; yet such are not the basis for Catholic worship. The Catholic knows "that in images there is no divinity or virtue on account of which they are to be worshipped, that no petitions can be addressed to them, and that no trust is to be placed in them. . . that the honour which is given to them is referred to the objects (prototypa) which they represent, so that through the images which we kiss, and before which we uncover our heads and kneel, we adore Christ and venerate the Saints whose likenesses they are" (Council of Trent, Sess. XXV, de invocatione Sanctorum).

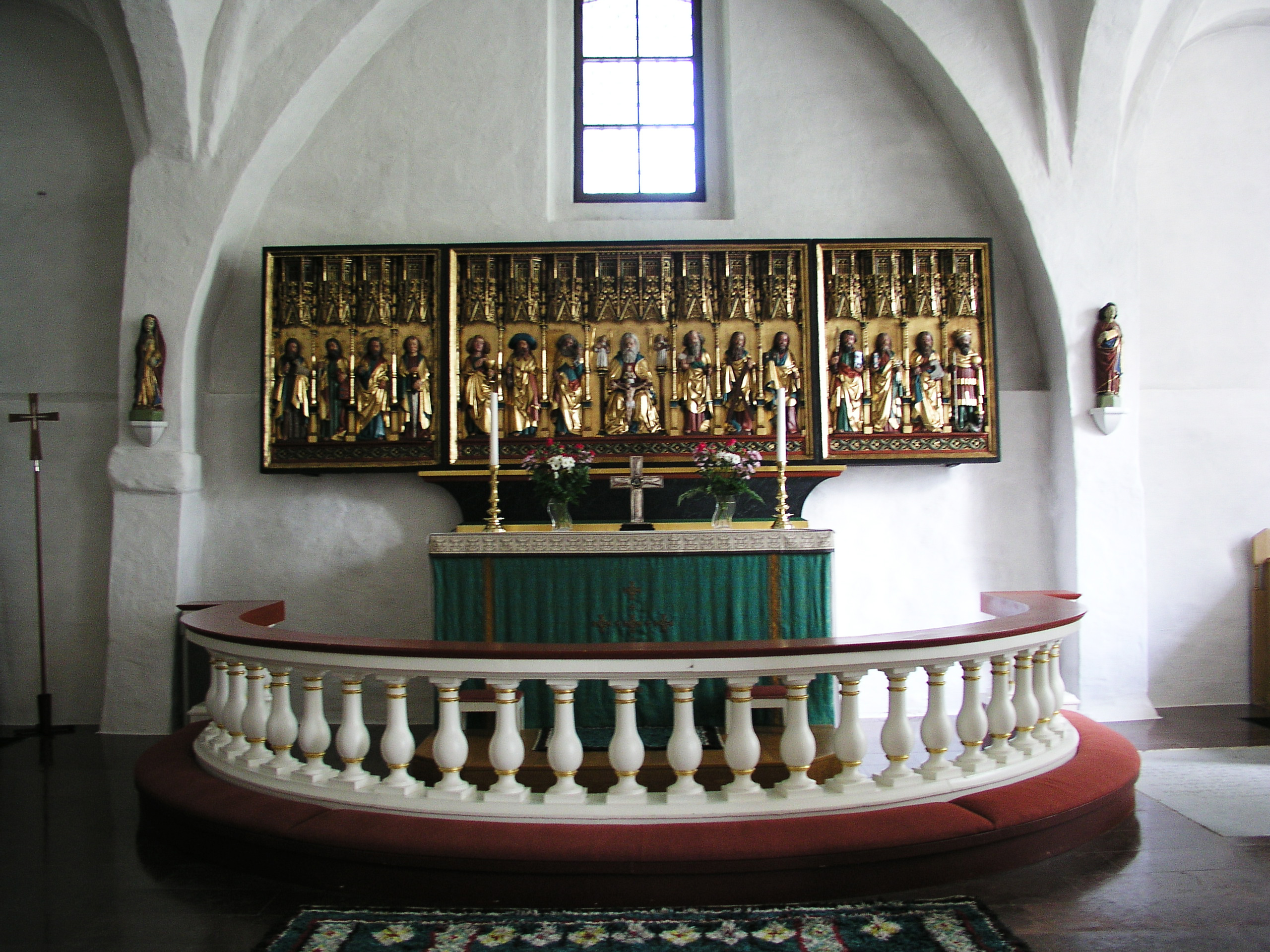
A 1512 altarpiece adorns the chancel of Drothem Church, a medieval-era Lutheran parish of the Church of Sweden.

The Catholic Church states that idolatry is consistently prohibited in the Hebrew Bible, including as one of the Ten Commandments (Exodus 20:3–4) and in the New Testament (for example 1 John 5:21, most significantly in the Apostolic Decree recorded in Acts 15:19–21). There is a great deal of controversy over the question of what constitutes idolatry and this has bearing on the visual arts and the use of icons and symbols in worship, and other matters. As in other Abrahamic religions the meaning of the term has been extended very widely by theologians. The Catechism of the Catholic Church states: "Idolatry not only refers to false pagan worship...Man commits idolatry whenever he honours and reveres a creature in place of God, whether this be gods or demons (for example satanism), power, pleasure, race, ancestors, the state, money etc." The USCCB also refers to materialism, sports, and those who resort to omens by mediums or others who claim to control time and history as potential forms of idolatry. Speaking of the effects of idolatry, Benedict XVI says, "Worship of an idol, instead of opening the human heart to Otherness, to a liberating relationship that permits the person to emerge from the narrow space of his own selfishness to enter the dimensions of love and of reciprocal giving, shuts the person into the exclusive and desperate circle of self-seeking"

==== Eastern Orthodoxy ====
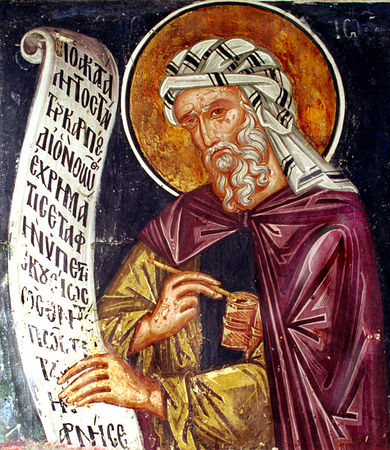
Icon of John of Damascus, who was a strong advocate of iconodulism, in Mount Athos

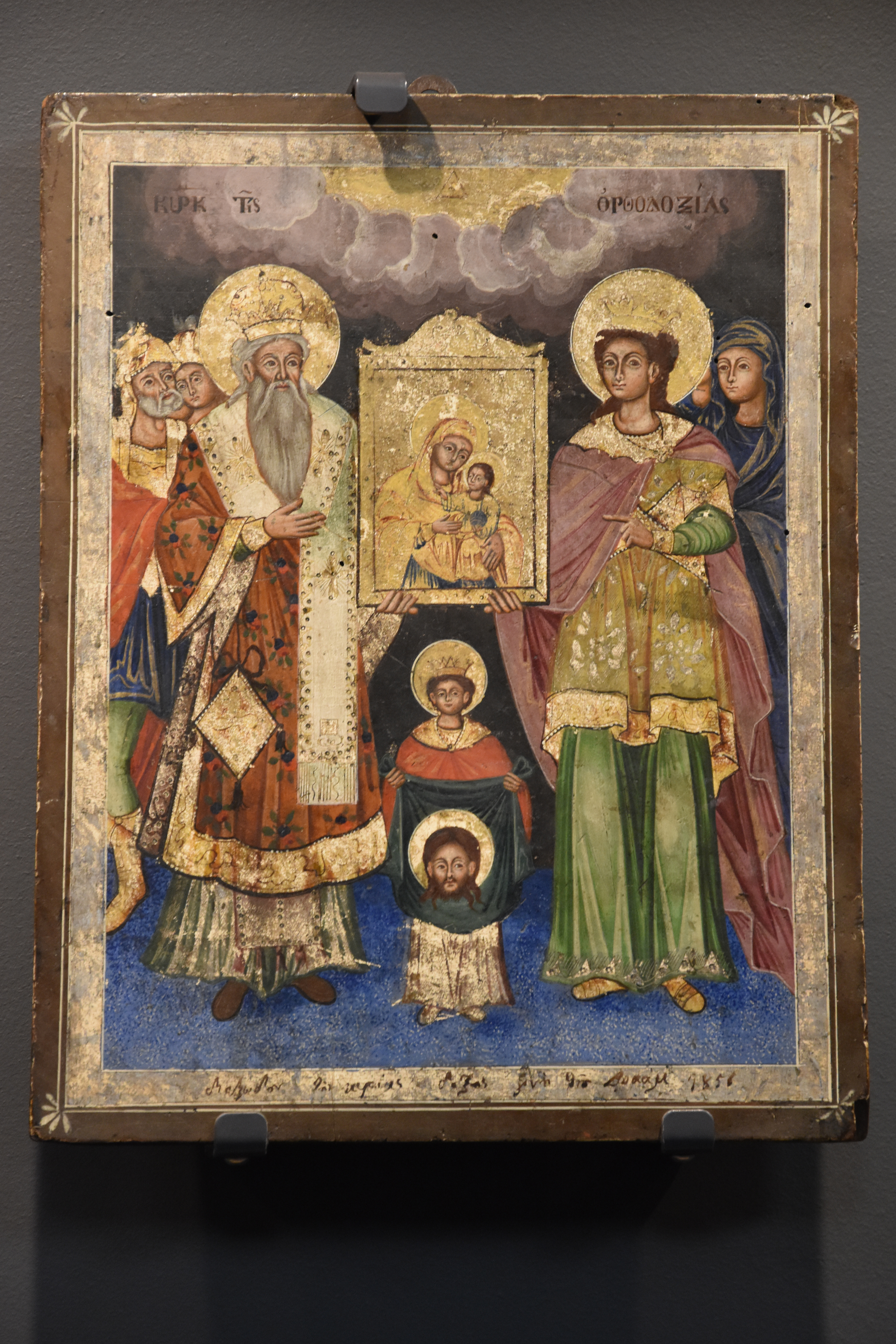
The Feast of Orthodoxy celebrates the end of Byzantine iconoclasm. Portrayed in this image of the Feast are 2 important icons of Constantinople - the Hodegetria & the Image of Edessa.

Eastern Orthodoxy avoids 3-dimensional religious iconography, but has a rich history of using 2 dimensional icons. Eastern Orthodox position in this regard is elaborated by John Damascene as follows

I do not adore creation more than the Creator, but I adore the creature created as I am, adopting creation freely and spontaneously that He might elevate our nature and make us partakers of His divine nature. Together with my Lord and King I worship Him clothed in the flesh, not as if it were a garment or He constituted a fourth person out of the Trinity — God forbid. That flesh is divine, and endures after its assumption (N.B. The opposite of this, i.e to say that Jesus' body was not real, is considered a heresy).
Human nature was not lost in the Godhead, but just as the Word made flesh remained the Word, so flesh became the Word remained flesh, becoming rather one with the Word through Union. I do not draw an image of the immortal Godhead. I paint the visible flesh of God, for it is impossible to represent a spirit, how much more God who gives breath yo the spirit.

— John Damascene, On Holy Images

Damascene argues that the injunction against icon-veneration applied as long as God hadn't been seen by mortals, but that no longer applied after Jesus' Incarnation. (see Supersession of the Old Covenant with the New Covenant). He interpreted the contemporary Byzantine iconoclasm as 'The letter kills while the spirit gives life'.(2 Corinthians 3:6)

He continues

It is clear that when you contemplate God, who is a pure spirit, becoming man for your sake, you will be able to clothe Him in with the human form. When the Invisible One becomes visible to the flesh, you may then draw a likeness of His form. When He who is a pure spirit, without form or limit, immeasurable in the boundlessness of His own nature, existing as God, takes upon Himself the form of a servant (Philippians 2:7) in substance and in stature, and a body of flesh, then you may draw His likeness, and show it to anyone willing to contemplate it. Depict His effable Condenscension, His virginal birth, His baptism in the Jordan, His Transfiguration on Tabor, His All-powerful sufferings, His death and miracles, the proofs of His Godhead, the deeds which He worked in the flesh through divine power, His life-saving Cross, His Sepulchre, and resurrection, and ascent into heaven. Give to it all the endurance of engraving and colour.

An image is a likeness of the original with a certain difference, for it not an exact reproduction of the original. Thus the Son is the living, substantial, unchangeable image of the Invisible God, (Colossians 1:15) bearing in Himself the whole Father, being in all things equal to him, differing in only being begotten by the Father, who is the begetter; the Son is begotten.

Of old God the incorporeal and uncircumscribed was never depicted. Now however, when God is seen clothed in flesh, and conversing with men, I make an image of the God whom I see. I do not worship matter, I worship the God of matter, who became matter for my sake and feigned to inhabit matter, who worked out my salvation through matter. I will not cease from honouring that matter which works my salvation. I venerate it, though not as God....Was not the thrice happy and thrice blessed wood of the Cross matter ? Was not the sacred & holy mountain of Calvary matter ? What of the life-giving rock, the Holy Sepulchre, the source of our resurrection, was it not matter ? Is not the most holy book of the Gospels matter ? Is not the blessed table which gives us the bread of life ? Are not the gold and silver matter, of which crosses and altarplate and chalices are made ? And before all these, is not the body and blood of our Lord matter ? Either do away with the veneration and worship due to all these things, or submit to the tradition of the Church in the worship of images, honouring God and His friends, and following in this the grace of the Holy Spirit. Do not despise matter, for it is not despicable. Nothing is that which God has made. This is the Manichaen heresy. That alone is despicable which does not come from God, but is our own invention, the spontaneous choice of will to disregard the natural law, that is to say, sin.

— John Damascene, On Holy Images

Nevertheless, Eastern Orthodoxy has some rules governing iconography. Portrayal of God the Father and Christ as Lamb, while commonplace in Catholicism, is prohibited. All iconography must follow the Byzantine art style, hence leaving no ground for artistic innovation. Athonite monk Dionysious of Fourna has codified the traditional canons of Eastern Orthodox iconography into his compendium titled 'The Painter's Manual'. In it, the painter is directed to receive the blessing of the priest and address a prayer mentioning Luke's painting the Theotokos' likeness and Jesus sending the imprint of his face to Abgarbefore starting to create an icon.

Following is an extract from the text

The creation rejoices on account of thee
The heaven with the sun and the moon; the Virgin is seated above on a throne with the infant Christ. Around her is the inscription "All creation rejoices on account of thee, gracious virgin, the hierarchy of angels, and the race of men. Above her to the right and left is a crowd of holy angels, four of whom hold scrolls; the first says : "Hail, glory of the angels; Hail protector of men." The second : "Hail, temple of God; Hail throne of the Lord". On the left, the third says : "Hail, paradise of delight; Hail tree of life. The fourth : "Hail, temple and throne of the great king". Below them are all choirs of the saints, arranged on clouds in this way : the prophets, with John the Forerunner in front of them holding a scroll which says : "Hail to thee, who fulfilled the sayings of the prophets". The apostles with Peter in front of them, saying : "Hail ceaseless mouthpiece of the apostles". The bishops, with Chrysostom in front, saying : "Hail, guardian of priests and the prize of bishops". The martyrs, with George in front of them, saying : "Hail, glory of the martyrs and strength of the victors". The holy men, with Antony in front of them, saying : "Hail glory of monks and splendour of holy men". The just kings, with Constantine in front of them, saying : "Hail, O virgin, strength and diadem of kings". The female martyrs, with Catherine in front of them, saying : "Hail, glory of virgins, their Fortress and their bastion". The holy women, with Euphrasia in front of them, saying : "Hail, happy comforter of solitary women". Below them is the paradise of Eden adorned with birds and various animals and decked with flowers and fine trees; it is surrounded by a wall of gold. The patriarch Abraham is in the midst of it with a crowd of innocent children in a circle round him. All the forefathers and just men are with him with women and children, gazing upwards with great rejoicing; with these is the good thief carrying the cross on his shoulders.

— Dionysious of Fourna, The Painter's Manual

==== Lutheran ====
A recent joint Lutheran-Orthodox statement made in the 7th Plenary of the Lutheran-Orthodox Joint Commission, in July 1993 in Helsinki, reaffirmed the Ecumenical Council decisions on the nature of Christ and the veneration of images:

7. As Lutherans and Orthodox we affirm that the teachings of the ecumenical councils are authoritative for our churches. The ecumenical councils maintain the integrity of the teaching of the undivided Church concerning the saving, illuminating/justifying and glorifying acts of God and reject heresies which subvert the saving work of God in Christ. Orthodox and Lutherans, however, have different histories. Lutherans have received the Nicaeno?Constantinopolitan Creed with the addition of the filioque. The Seventh Ecumenical Council, the Second Council of Nicaea in 787, which rejected iconoclasm and restored the veneration of icons in the churches, was not part of the tradition received by the Reformation. Lutherans, however, rejected the iconoclasm of the 16th century, and affirmed the distinction between adoration due to the Triune God alone and all other forms of veneration (CA 21). Through historical research this council has become better known. Nevertheless it does not have the same significance for Lutherans as it does for the Orthodox. Yet, Lutherans and Orthodox are in agreement that the Second Council of Nicaea confirms the christological teaching of the earlier councils and in setting forth the role of images (icons) in the lives of the faithful reaffirms the reality of the incarnation of the eternal Word of God, when it states: "The more frequently, Christ, Mary, the mother of God, and the saints are seen, the more are those who see them drawn to remember and long for those who serve as models, and to pay these icons the tribute of salutation and respectful veneration. Certainly this is not the full adoration in accordance with our faith, which is properly paid only to the divine nature, but it resembles that given to the figure of the honored and life?giving cross, and also to the holy books of the gospels and to other sacred objects" (Definition of the Second Council of Nicaea).

Martin Luther held to the "importance of images as tools for instruction and aids to devotion". He stated that "If it is not a sin but good to have the image of Christ in my heart, why should it be a sin to have it in my eyes?" He permitted the commissioning of new Lutheran altarpieces, including those of the Last Supper. The Schneeberg Altarpiece was placed at the high altar of St. Wolfgang's Church, Schneeberg and as Lutheran sacred imagery, reflects "the devotional forms of fifteenth- and early sixteenth century northern art". Lutheran sacred art, however, gained a new function in addition to exciting one's mind to thoughts of the Divine by also serving a didactic purpose. He saw the Evangelical Lutheran Church as a continuation of the "ancient, apostolic church" and Lutherans therefore continued to worship in pre-Reformation churches, generally with few alterations to the interior.

==== Methodist ====
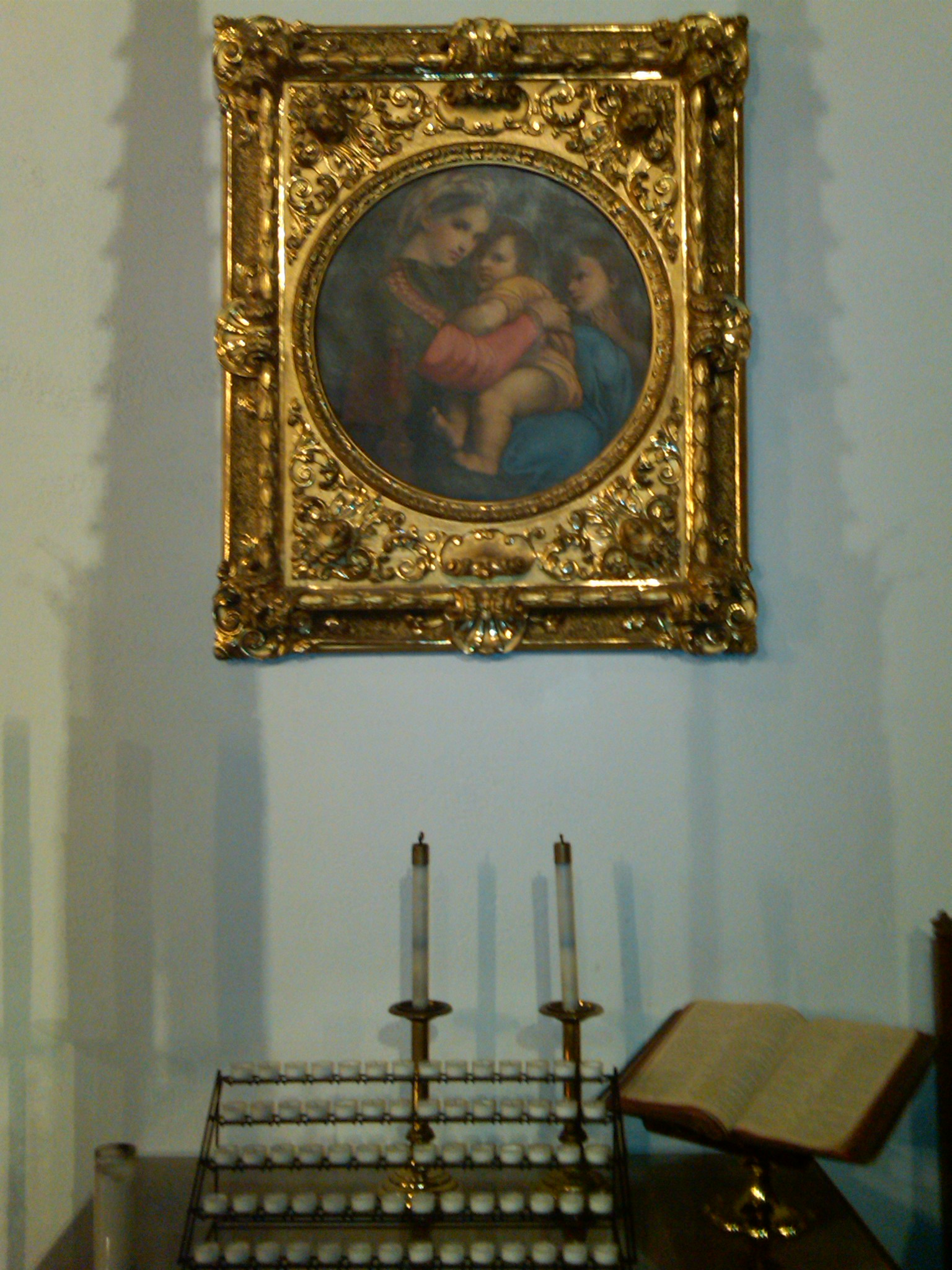
Madonna and Child with a votive candle rack and kneeler in a Methodist church in Cleveland.

Writing for the United Methodist Church, Tricia Brown discusses the importance of sacred art:

Throughout the ages, art has been a part of the church. God designed the temple, employing artisans to create its beautiful and ornate workmanship. Churches of old included stained-glass windows created to illustrate God’s word, and even the most simple country churches often include beautiful wooden crosses and podiums. Writers, speakers and musicians have always taken part in worship services. Art is and always has been part of the church. It is simply another way in which people wonder at and express God’s creativity, love and majesty.

The Methodist Modern Art Collection is housed by the Methodist Church of Great Britain, and the Secretary of the Methodist Conference, the Revd Canon Gareth J Powell, writes that it features "vibrant expressions of God's love, and a whole range of conversations that are both missional and pastoral".

==== Reformed ====
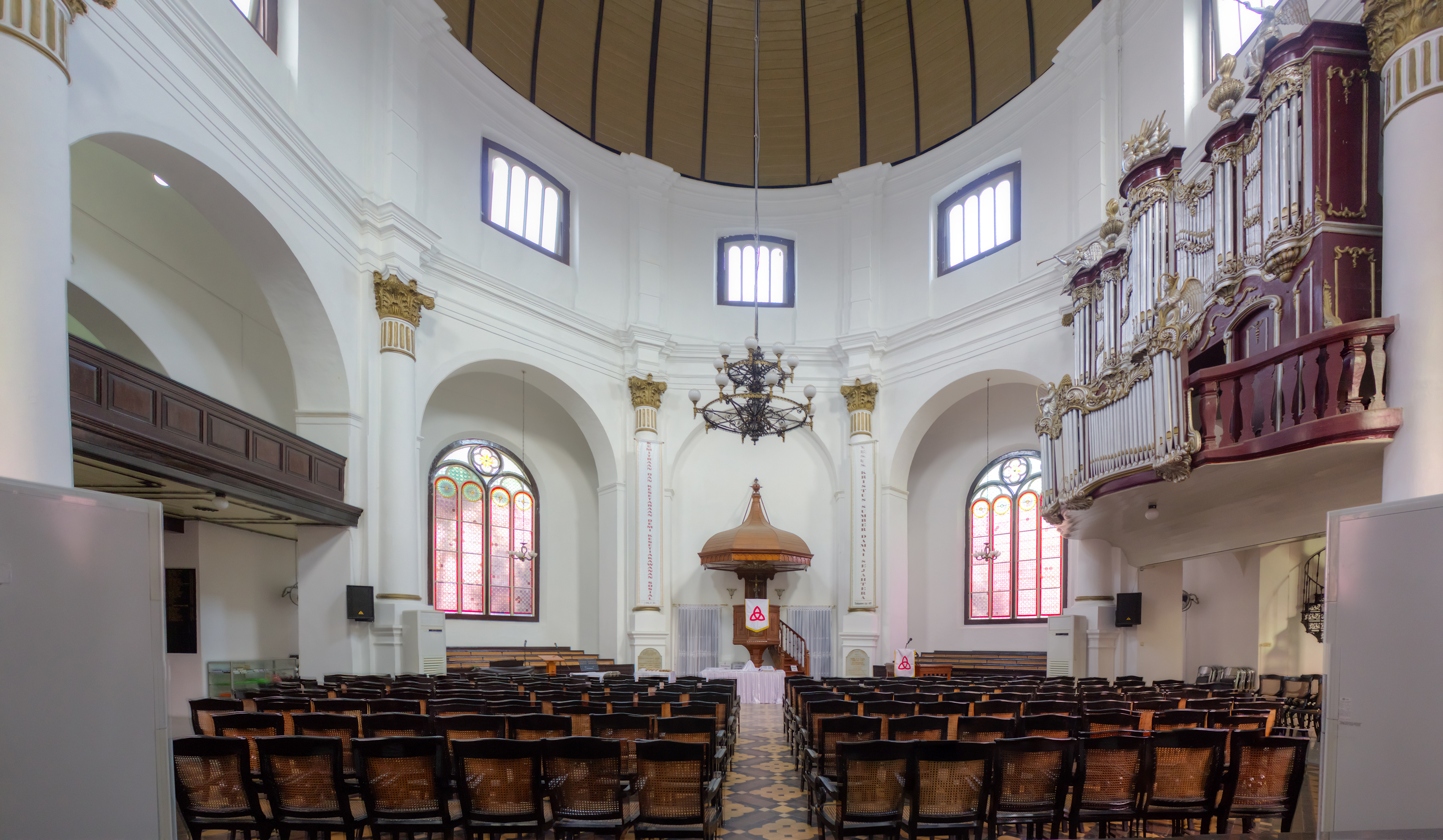
Reformed Christianity has been known at times for its simple, unadorned churches and lifestyles, as depicted in this photograph of the interior of a Calvinist church in Semarang.

John Calvin, the progenitor of the Reformed tradition of Christianity that influenced the Continental Reformed, Congregational, Anglican and Presbyterian traditions, was always extremely hostile to all publicly displayed religious images, which were systematically destroyed by Calvinists, as in the Beeldenstorm in the Netherlands. Towards the end of the 16th century there were disputes between Lutherans and Calvinists, with the Lutherans offering strong opposition to Calvinist iconoclasm. Though both groupings did not object to book illustrations or prints of biblical events, or portraits of reformers, production of large-scale religious art virtually ceased in Protestant regions after about 1540, and artists shifted to secular subjects, ironically often including revived classical mythology.

The earliest catechisms of Reformed (Calvinist) Christianity, written in the 16th through 18th centuries, including the Heidelberg (1563), Westminster (1647) and Fisher's (1765), included discussions in a question and answer format detailing how the creation of images of God (including Jesus) was counter to their understanding of the Second Commandment's prohibition against creating images of worship in any manner. 20th century Calvinist theologian J. I. Packer, in Chapter 4 of his book Knowing God, writes that, "Imagining God in our heads can be just as real a breach of the second commandment as imagining Him by the work of our hands." His overall concern is that "The mind that takes up with images is a mind that has not yet learned to love and attend to God's Word." In other words, image making relies on human sources rather than on divine revelation. Another typical Christian argument for this position might be that God was incarnate as a human being, not as an object of wood, stone or canvas, and therefore the only God-directed service of images permitted is the service of other people. During the period of Archbishop William Laud's conflicts with Puritans within the Church of England, the use of ritual implements prescribed by the Book of Common Prayer was a frequent cause of conflict. (See vestments controversy)

=== Non-use in Anabaptist Christianity ===
Proto-Anabaptist leader Andreas Karlstadt read the commandment that one should make no graven images, and he applied that to any image. He said that if someone made an image of something in heaven, on the earth, or below the earth, then he is breaking the commandment and is guilty of idolatry.

The Amish are an Anabaptist Christian group that forbids the use of images in secular life. In their critiques these groups argue that such practices are in effect little different from idolatry, and that they localize and particularize God, who, they argue, is beyond human depiction.

== See also ==
- Bibliolatry
- Christianity and Paganism
- Heterodoxy
- Aniconism in Islam
- Jean-Luc Marion
