= Aniconism in Christianity =

Prohibition of the veneration of images in Christianity

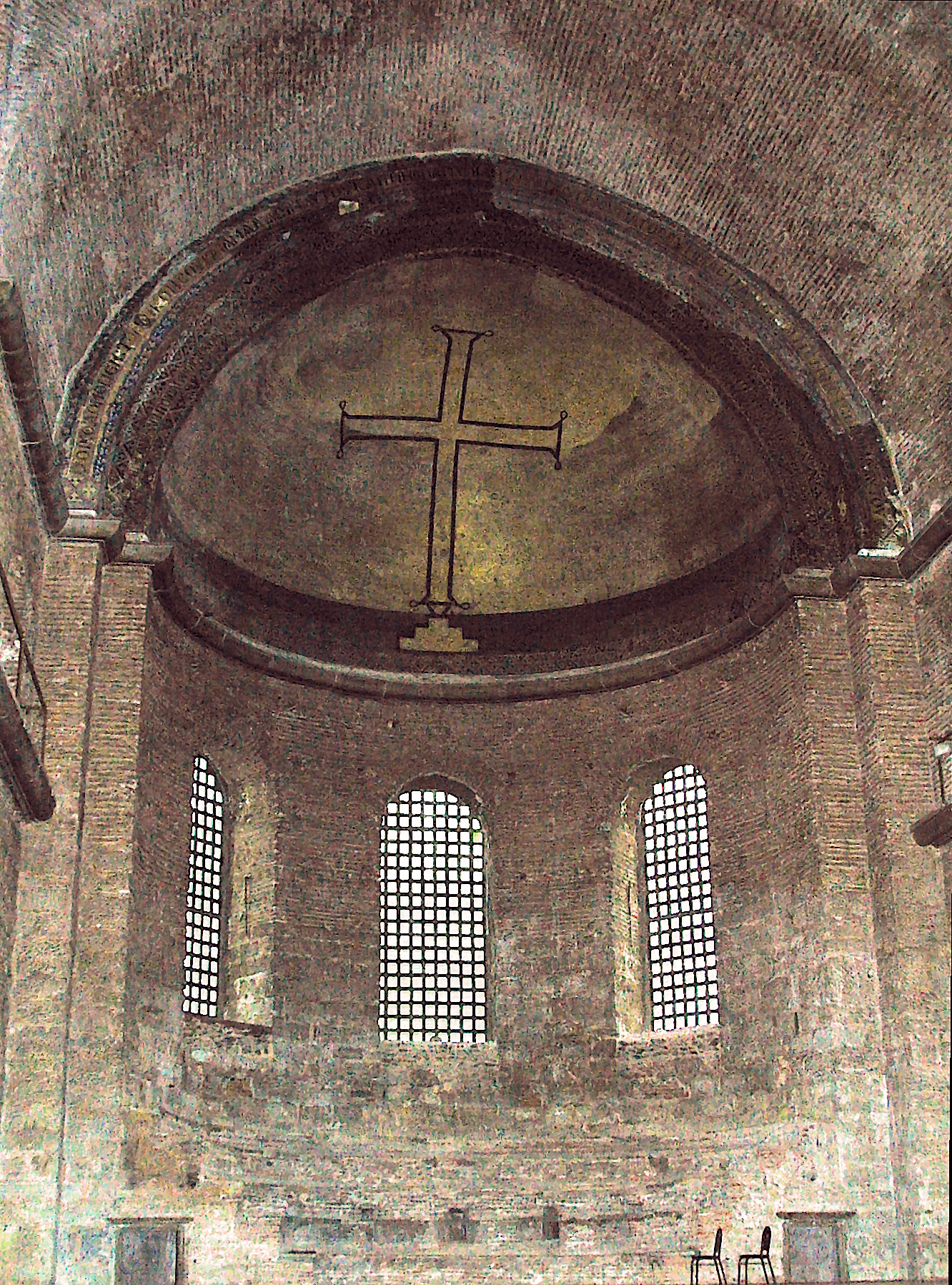
A simple cross replaced a mosaic figure during the Byzantine iconoclasm, Hagia Irene Church in Istanbul

Aniconism is the absence of material representations of the natural world and the supernatural in various cultures. Most denominations of Christianity have not generally practiced aniconism, or the avoidance or prohibition of these types of images, even dating back to early Christian art and architecture. Those in the faith have generally had an active tradition of making artwork and Christian media; depicting God, Jesus, The Holy Spirit, religious figures including saints and prophets, and other aspects of theology like The Trinity and Manus Dei.

Periods of aniconism have characterized various points of Christian history; early Christianity was largely aniconic, with Church Fathers Tertullian and Clement of Alexandria regarding the Ten Commandments to be binding on Christians. Early Christian apologists argued that God was beyond representation "and insisted that material things, unlike divine beings, were subject to disintegration, rust and decay." Marcus Minucius Felix stated that Christians lacked images "because Christians believe in and worship an invisible God." Aniconism was notable during the controversy of the Byzantine iconoclasm of the eighth century, and following the Protestant Reformation of the 16th century, when Calvinism in particular rejected all images in churches, and this practice continues today in conservative Reformed (Calvinist) churches, as well as in Anabaptist Christianity. The Catholic Church has always defended the use of sacred images in churches, shrines, and homes, encouraging their veneration but condemning anyone who would worship them as if they were divine themselves.

The use of religious icons and images continues to be advocated at the highest level by religious leaders of major Christian denominations such as some Lutherans, Anglo-Catholics and Roman Catholics. The veneration of icons is also a key element of the doxology of the Eastern Orthodox Church. The Catholic Church and Eastern Orthodox Church accept the church council which condemned iconoclasm and mandated the use of sacred images, the icons of saints, and the crucifix in churches, public shrines, and in homes. The explanation of the consistency of sacred images with the Christian religion was largely based on the arguments of St. John Damascene.

Modern Anglicanism contains both schools of thought – aniconism and iconodulism. While some Anglicans (typically of the Low-Church variety) maintain the aniconism of the English Reformation, articulated in the religious injunctions of Edward VI and Elizabeth I, as well as the Homily against the Peril of Idolatry and the Superfluous Decking of Churches, other Anglicans, influenced by the Oxford Movement and later Anglo-Catholicism, have introduced the devotional use of images back into their churches.

Christian aniconism has only very rarely covered general secular images, unlike aniconism in Islam; Anabaptist groups such as the Amish are rare exceptions.

== Early Christianity ==
Several voices in early Christianity expressed "grave reservations about the dangers of images", though contextualizing these remarks has often been the source of fierce controversy, as the same texts were brought out at intervals in succeeding centuries. Ernst Kitzinger described the mentions of Christian views on Christian images before the mid-6th century as "scattered and spotty", and of an earlier period wrote:

It is a striking fact that when painting and sculpture first began to infiltrate Christian assembly rooms and cemeteries they did so practically unheeded by either opponents of or apologists for Christianity—engaged though these were in passionate disputes over idols and idolatry. No literary statement from the period prior to the year 300 would make one suspect the existence of any Christian images other than the most laconic and hieroglyphic of symbols.

— Kitzinger, page 86

Yet from archaeology it is clear that the use of quite complex figurative Christian images was widespread by that date. There are mentions of images of Jesus from the 2nd century onwards. The Catacombs of Rome contain the earliest images, mostly painted, but also including reliefs carved on sarcophagi, dating from the end of the 2nd century onwards. Jesus is often represented by pictogram symbols, though he is also portrayed. In the Dura-Europos church, of about 230–256, which of the very early churches surviving is in the best condition, there are frescos of biblical scenes including a figure of Jesus, as well as Christ as the Good Shepherd.

The traditional Protestant position on the history of images in places of worship however is expressed by Philip Schaff, who claimed that:

Yet previous to the time of Constantine we find no trace of an image of Christ properly speaking except among the Gnostic Carpocratians and in the case of the heathen emperor Alexander Severus who adorned his domestic chapel as a sort of pantheistic Pantheon with representatives of all religions. The above mentioned idea of the uncomely personal appearance of Jesus the entire silence of the Gospels about it and the Old Testament prohibition of images restrained the church from making either pictures or statues of Christ until the Nicene age when a great reaction in this respect took place though not without energetic and long continued opposition.

— Philip Schaff, History of the Christian Church, page 381

Paul Corby Finney's analysis of Early Christian writing and material remains distinguishes three different sources of attitudes affecting Early Christians on the issue: "first that humans could have a direct vision of God; second that they could not; and, third, that although humans could see God they were best advised not to look, and were strictly forbidden to represent what they had seen". These derived respectively from Greek and Near Eastern pagan religions, from Ancient Greek philosophy, and from the Jewish tradition and the Old Testament. Of the three, Finney concludes that "overall, Israel's aversion to sacred images influenced early Christianity considerably less than the Greek philosophical tradition of invisible deity apophatically defined", so placing less emphasis on the Jewish background of most of the first Christians than most traditional accounts. Finney also suggests that "the reasons for the non-appearance of Christian art before 200 have nothing to do with principled aversion to art, with other-worldliness, or with anti-materialism. The truth is simple and mundane: Christians lacked land and capital. Art requires both. As soon as they began to acquire land and capital, Christians began to experiment with their own distinctive forms of art".

Images were also associated with the idolatry of the pagan Ancient Roman religion and other cults and religions around them, and much early Christian polemic was devoted to attacking paganism for idolatry. In the 1st century the issues are discussed in the Letters of St. Paul and a prohibition of idolatry is included in the Apostolic Decree. The objections to "decorative and symbolic devices, narrative and didactic images", a description that encompasses much though not all of the earliest Christian art, were much less, as these were not plausibly capable of "idolatric abuse"; according to Kitzinger, "much of the art of the Roman catacombs betrays a studied attempt to avoid any suspicion or encouragement of idolatric practices". Jocelyn Toynbee agrees: "In two-dimensional, applied art of this kind there was never any danger of idolatry in the sense of actual worship of cult-images and votive pictures".

In the 4th century there are increased, if scattered, expressions of opposition to images. At the Spanish non-ecumenical Synod of Elvira (c. 305) bishops concluded, "Pictures are not to be placed in churches, so that they do not become objects of worship and adoration", if understood this way, it's the earliest such prohibition known. Though a more formal translation would suggest it is about not having images painted directly into the walls in order to protect them from vandalism. Eusebius (died 339) wrote a letter to Constantia (Emperor Constantine's sister) saying "To depict purely the human form of Christ before its transformation, on the other hand, is to break the commandment of God and to fall into pagan error"; though this did not stop her decorating her mausoleum with such images. By the end of the century Bishop Epiphanius of Salamis (died 403) "seems to have been the first cleric to have taken up the matter of Christian religious images as a major issue". He wrote an appeal to John, Bishop of Jerusalem (c. 394) in which he recounted how he tore apart a curtain hanging on the doors of the church decorated with an image of 'Christ or one of the saints' and admonished the other bishop that such images are "opposed ... to our religion", while also replacing the curtain with another expensively embroidered one. Other writers cited in later controversies were Clement of Alexandria, Tertullian, and Lactantius, although evidence of opposition to images by church leaders is often also evidence of their usage in the church. In the second century Origen of Alexandria opposed the use of images.

It has been suggested that the question of images caused a tension in the early church between a theologically trained clerical elite and the broad mass of followers of the church, and perhaps especially women; the letter of Eusebius being a leading piece of evidence cited here. However other scholars, including Finney and Toynbee, dispute this reading of the documentary evidence, pointing out that the physical evidence of sites such as the Catacomb of Callistus suggests that "church authorities at least tolerated if not approved both the decoration and the content of the iconography on its own property over a fairly long period of time".

There is some evidence that the use of images was regarded as especially characteristic of heretics. Irenaeus, (c. 130–202) in his Against Heresies (1:25–26) says scornfully of the Gnostic Carpocratians, "They also possess images, some of them painted, and others formed from different kinds of material; while they maintain that a likeness of Christ was made by Pilate at that time when Jesus lived among them. They crown these images, and set them up along with the images of the philosophers of the world that is to say, with the images of Pythagoras, and Plato, and Aristotle, and the rest. They have also other modes of honouring these images, after the same manner of the Gentiles [pagans]". Irenaeus does not speak critically of icons or portraits in a general sense, only of certain gnostic sectarians use of icons. On the other hand, by the 8th century there is evidence that opposition to images was associated with what was by then the largely vanished heresy of Arianism, though the historical evidence for this now appears slender, and important early figurative mosaics in Italy were created under Arian rule.

== After Constantine ==
However, as Christianity increasingly spread among gentiles with traditions of religious images, and especially after the conversion of Constantine (c. 312), the legalization of Christianity, and, later that century, the establishment of Christianity as the state religion of the Roman Empire, many new people came into the new large public churches, which began to be decorated with images that certainly drew in part on imperial and pagan imagery: "The representations of Christ as the Almighty Lord on his judgment throne owed something to pictures of Zeus. Portraits of the Mother of God were not wholly independent of a pagan past of venerated mother-goddesses. In the popular mind the saints had come to fill a role that had been played by heroes and deities." The possibility that Christian art was a movement from below, disapproved of by the clerical hierarchy, vanishes in the large churches built with imperial patronage at the urging of that hierarchy.

The earliest literary evidence of proskynesis before images comes from the first half of the 6th century; it had already been common before the cross by the end of the 4th century. The lighting of candles before images, and leaving lit candles and lamps (going beyond what might merely be necessary to actually see them) is mentioned in 6th century sources.

== From Justinian to the Iconoclastic period ==
The period after the reign of Justinian (527–565) evidently saw a huge increase in the use of images, both in volume and quality, and a gathering aniconic reaction. According to Kitzinger, "during the late sixth and seventh centuries devotional practices in front of images became elaborate, common, and intense". In addition it was in this period that images seem to have become common in Christian homes, and "Once admitted to that sphere their use and abuse was beyond control". Literary mentions of Christian images greatly increase, in the accounts of pilgrims to the Holy Land, in works of history, and in popular accounts of the lives of saints; at the same time some of these begin to mention acts of iconoclasm against images. The legendary nature of much of the last two types of material is clear, but the stories remain evidence of practices around images and beliefs as to what images were capable of.

It is this period that the attribution to individual images of the potential to achieve, channel or display various forms of spiritual grace or divine power becomes a regular motif in literature. In the many miracle stories, there is a "tendency to break down the barrier between image and prototype", so that "the image acts or behaves as the subject itself is expected to act or behave. It makes known its wishes ... It enacts evangelical teachings, ... When attacked it bleeds, ... [and] In some cases it defends itself against infidels with physical force ...". Images make promises, and demand that promises made by others are kept, are immune to attack, and most commonly of all, images bestow "some kind of material benefit upon ... votaries". The most famous example of this is the role ascribed to the Image of Edessa (or Mandylion) in the failure of the Persian siege of the city in 544. The image is not mentioned in the account of Procopius, writing soon after the event, but first appears as the agent of the failure in the history of Evagrius Scholasticus of about 593. Though most often images are described as acting through some kind of intermediary, sometimes direct physical contact produces the benefit, as with a dry well that refilled when an icon was lowered in the bucket, or medical benefit ascribed to drinking some ground-up plaster from a fresco in water.

In the 6th century Julian of Atramytion objected to sculpture, but not paintings, which is effectively the Orthodox position to the present day, except for small works.

== Byzantine iconoclasm ==
There were two periods of iconoclasm, or image destruction, in the Byzantine Empire, in the mid eighth and early ninth centuries. The arguments of the Iconoclasts remain rather obscure, as almost all their writings were destroyed after the "Triumph of Orthodoxy". The simple belief that images were idolatrous appears to have been their main motive; reference was made to the prohibitions on the worship of graven images in the Mosaic Law, and aniconic statements by the Church Fathers, some of which may now be lost. One theological issue revolved around the two natures of Jesus. Iconoclasts believed that icons could not represent both the divine and the human natures of the Messiah at the same time, but separately. Because an icon which depicted Jesus as purely physical would be Nestorianism, and one which showed Him as both human and divine would not be able to do so without confusing the two natures into one mixed nature, which was Monophysitism, all icons were thus heretical.

The political aspects of the conflicts are complex, involving with the relationship between the Byzantine Emperors, the Orthodox Church councils, and the Pope. There has been much scholarly discussion over the possible influence on the Iconoclasts of the aniconism in Islam, the century-old religion which had inflicted devastating defeats on Byzantium in the decades preceding. Most scholars reject direct religious influence, though many feel the feeling of crisis produced by defeats at the hands of Islam contributed to the Iconoclast movement. Both the cross and secular two-dimensional images continued to be acceptable, indeed were used to replace religious imagery in the two best-known examples. The defeat of Byzantine Iconoclasm was so emphatic that the issue has never arisen again in Orthodoxy. Indeed, the final cessation of the iconoclast controversy and the permanent use of images in the Orthodox Church is celebrated annually during Great Lent during the Feast of Orthodoxy.

== After Iconoclasm ==
Figurative monumental sculpture was still avoided in the West until the time of Charlemagne around 800; the Franks had no association of sculpture with cult images and a life-size crucifix (with "corpus") known to have been in the Palatine Chapel, Aachen, was probably a pivotal work, opening the way to the free general use of large sculpture. This was contemporary with the Byzantine iconoclasm (see above). Religious sculpture, especially if large and free-standing, has always been extremely rare in Eastern Christianity. The Western church was anxious to distinguish its use of images from idolatry, and set out its theological position in the Carolingian Libri Carolini, in similar but slightly different terms to those set out by the Eastern church after the episode of Iconoclasm.

In his travels through the Auvergne between 1007 and 1020 the cleric Bernard of Angers was initially disapproving of the large crucifixes with a sculpted three-dimensional corpus, and other religious statues that he saw, but he came to accept them. The Gero Cross, the earliest life-size crucifix image to survive, probably dates to around 960.

=== God the Father ===
The depiction of God the Father in art long remained unacceptable; he was typically only shown with the features of Jesus, which had become fairly standardized by the 6th century, in scenes such as the Garden of Eden. The rationale for this was the doctrine of the pre-existing Christ or Logos, which holds that Christ has existed from the beginning of time. Very simply put, as a member of the Holy Trinity of three persons in one God, representations of God could be achieved by depicting Jesus as Logos, except in the few cases where both Jesus and God the Father needed to be shown separately, as in scenes of the Baptism of Jesus. Alternatively God the Father was represented only by the Hand of God, which probably reached Christian art from Hellenistic Judaism, as it is prominent in the wall paintings of the 3rd century Dura-Europos synagogue in Syria. Depictions of God the Father, essentially as the Old Testament Ancient of Days, only became common in the West from about 1200 onwards, and remain controversial in Eastern Orthodoxy, still being prohibited by the Russian Orthodox Church for example (where images of the Ancient of Days, also banned, are held to represent Christ). Free-standing monumental sculpture is also avoided by the Orthodox churches, and reliefs are much rarer, especially large ones. On the other hand, icons have a slightly different theological position in Orthodoxy and play a more significant part in religious life than in Roman Catholicism, let alone the Protestant churches.

=== Bernard of Clairvaux ===
Bernard of Clairvaux (1090–1153) was an influential Cistercian monk who famously wrote against the excessive use of imagery in a monastic context, and was largely responsible for the unornamented style of Cistercian architecture. However his attack concentrated on what he saw as frivolous non-religious elements in the Romanesque religious art of his day, which he said distracted monks from their religious life. Nonetheless, he was prepared to sacrifice religious imagery also, both to save money and avoid "distractions of the senses".

== In the Church of the East ==
In the Church of the East, pejoratively but incorrectly also known as the Nestorian Church by its detractors, opposition to religious images eventually became the norm due to the rise of Islam in the region, where it forbade any type of depictions of Saints and biblical prophets. As such, the Church was forced to get rid of their icons.

Houses of worship belonging to the Assyrian Church of the East tend to be simple.

In their homes, Christians belonging to the Assyrian Church of the East hang a plain Christian Cross on the eastern wall of the main room.

== Reformation and Counter-Reformation ==
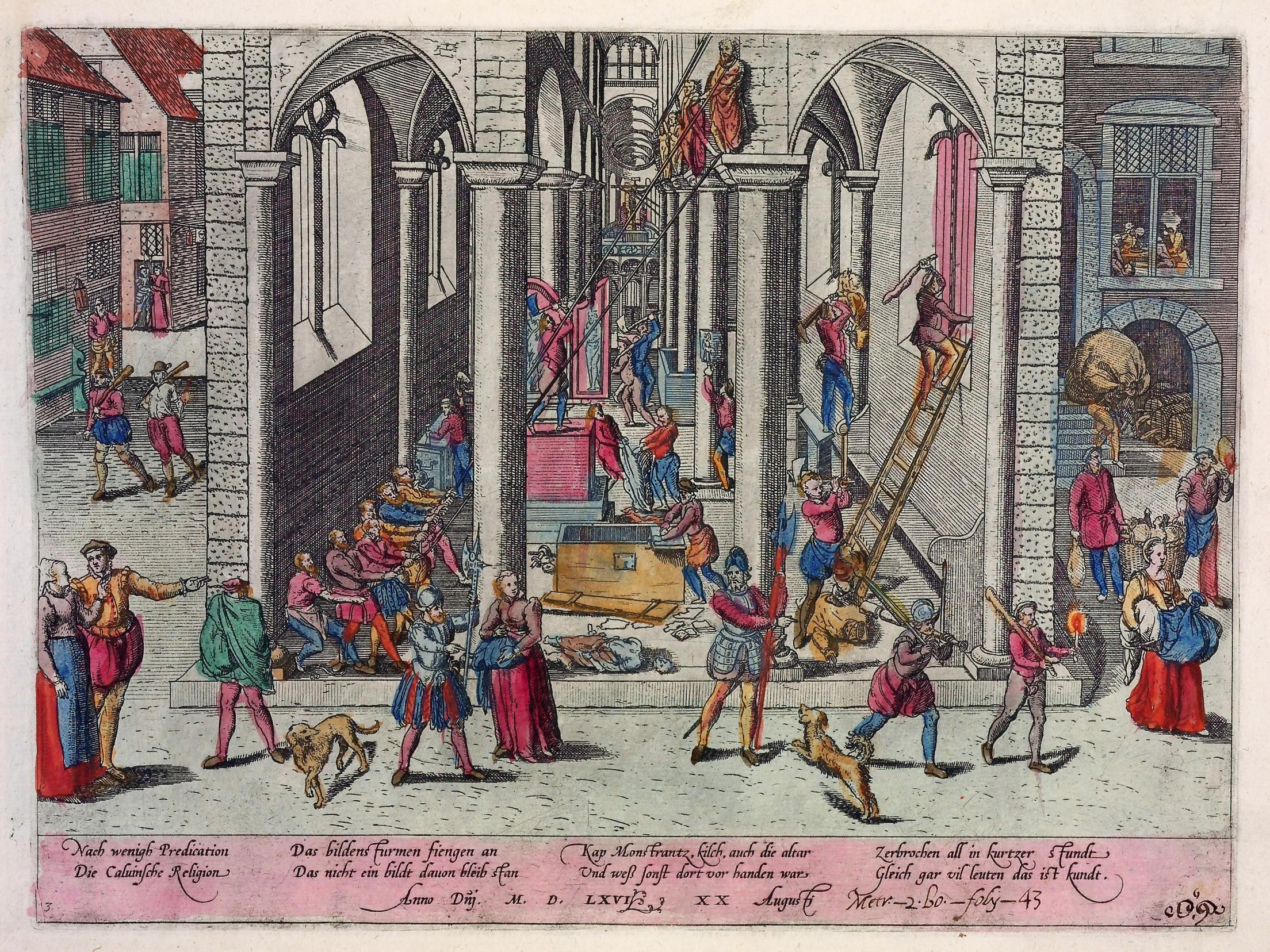
Print of the destruction in the Church of Our Lady in Antwerp by Calvinists, the "signature event" of the Beeldenstorm, August 20, 1566, by Frans Hogenberg

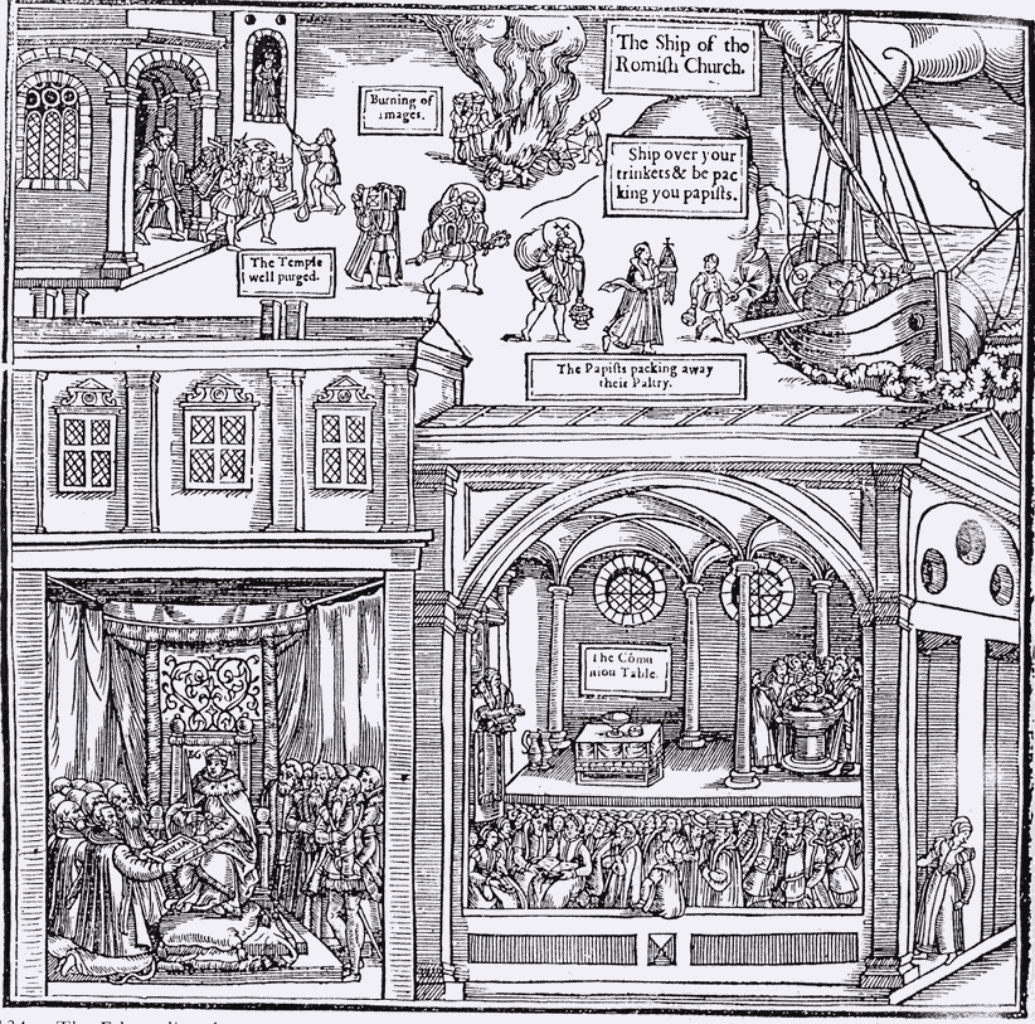
Woodcut of 1563 from the Protestant Foxe's Book of Martyrs showing the destruction of Catholic images in the upper portion. Edward VI, whom Cranmer charged to emulate Josiah's purging of the Temple, is shown enthroned in lower left, while a Reformed church service according to the Book of Common Prayer takes place in the lower right.

Opposition to religious imagery was a feature of proto-Protestant movements such as the Lollards in England.

The Reformation produced two main branches of Protestant Christianity; one was the Evangelical Lutheran churches, which followed the teachings of Martin Luther (1483–1546), and the other Reformed churches, which followed the ideas of John Calvin (1509–1564) and of Huldrych Zwingli (1484–1531). Out of these branches grew three main sects, the Lutheran tradition, as well as the Continental Reformed and Anglican traditions, the latter two broadly following the Reformed (Calvinist) faith. Lutherans and Reformed Christians had different views regarding religious imagery.

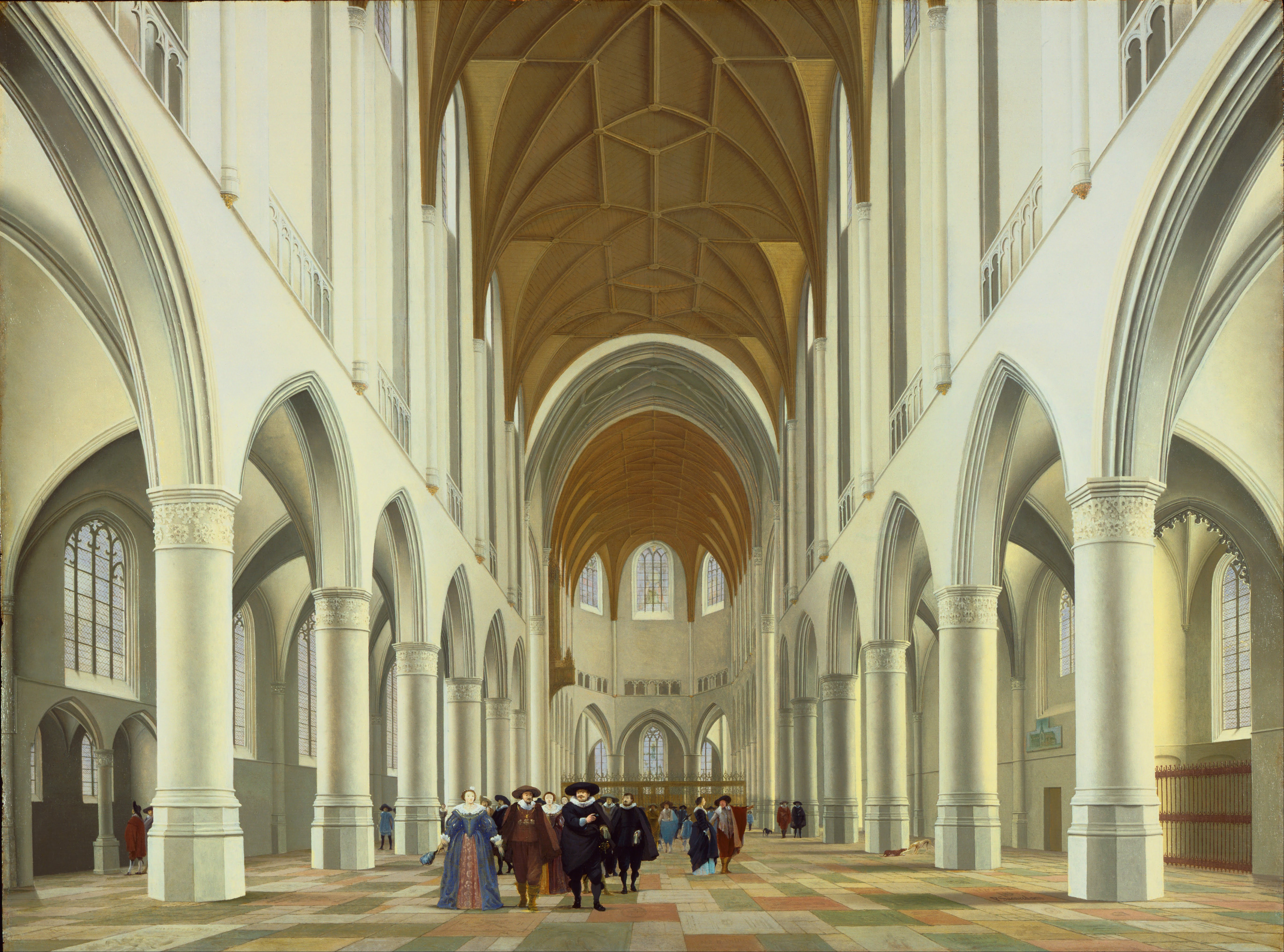
Pieter Jansz. Saenredam, Interior of Saint Bavo, Haarlem, 1631, a medieval cathedral stripped bare after it adopted the Reformed faith.

For Lutherans, "the Reformation renewed rather than removed the religious image", at least temporarily. The Lutheran Divine Service occurred in ornate churches, reflecting Lutherans' exalted view of the Eucharist. Lutherans employed the use of the crucifix as it highlighted Martin Luther's theology of the cross. Lutheran altarpieces, such as Last Supper by Lucas Cranach the Elder (c. 1472–1553), were commissioned, although they now served a dual purpose of exciting the mind to thoughts of the Divine, as well as serving to teach Lutheran doctrine. The altarpiece in St. Peter und Paul in Weimar exemplified the doctrine of the communion of saints by showing Luther and Cranach "alongside John the Baptist at the foot of the cross". Lutherans strongly opposed the iconoclastic campaigns of the Reformed partisans. But within a few decades of the start of the Reformation, production of new paintings for Lutheran churches had all but ceased, and large religious sculpture (as opposed to smaller figures decorating pulpits and other fittings) has never been produced for Lutheran use.

On the other hand, at the time of the Reformation, Calvinists preached in violent terms the rejection of what they perceived as idolatrous Catholic practices such as religious pictures, statues, or relics of saints, as well as against the Lutheran retention of sacred art. Andreas Karlstadt (1486–1541) was the earliest extreme iconoclast, to be followed by Huldrych Zwingli and John Calvin. The Reformed (Calvinist) churches (including the Anglican, Puritan/Congregational and Reformed Baptist churches) completely prohibited the display of religious images. Reformed theologians such as Francis Turretin, Theodore Beza, the Divines of the Westminster Assembly, and later Robert Dabney and John Murray, explicitly reject the depiction of Christ, citing arguments drawn from the second commandment, as well as from writings of the early church, using the same texts and arguments as Byzantine iconoclasts. The Calvinist Westminster Larger Catechism of 1647 asks in Question 109:

'What are the sins forbidden in the second commandment?
Answer: The sins forbidden in the second commandment are, all devising, counseling, commanding, using, and anywise approving, any religious worship not instituted by God himself; tolerating a false religion; the making any representation of God, of all or of any of the three persons, either inwardly in our mind, or outwardly in any kind of image or likeness of any creature'.

The Puritan Thomas Watson (c. 1620–1686) declared:

Romanists make images of God the Father, painting him in their church windows as an old man; and an image of Christ on the crucifix; and, because it is against the letter of this commandment, they sacrilegiously blot it out of their catechism, and divide the tenth commandment into two.

— Thomas Watson, The Ten Commandments

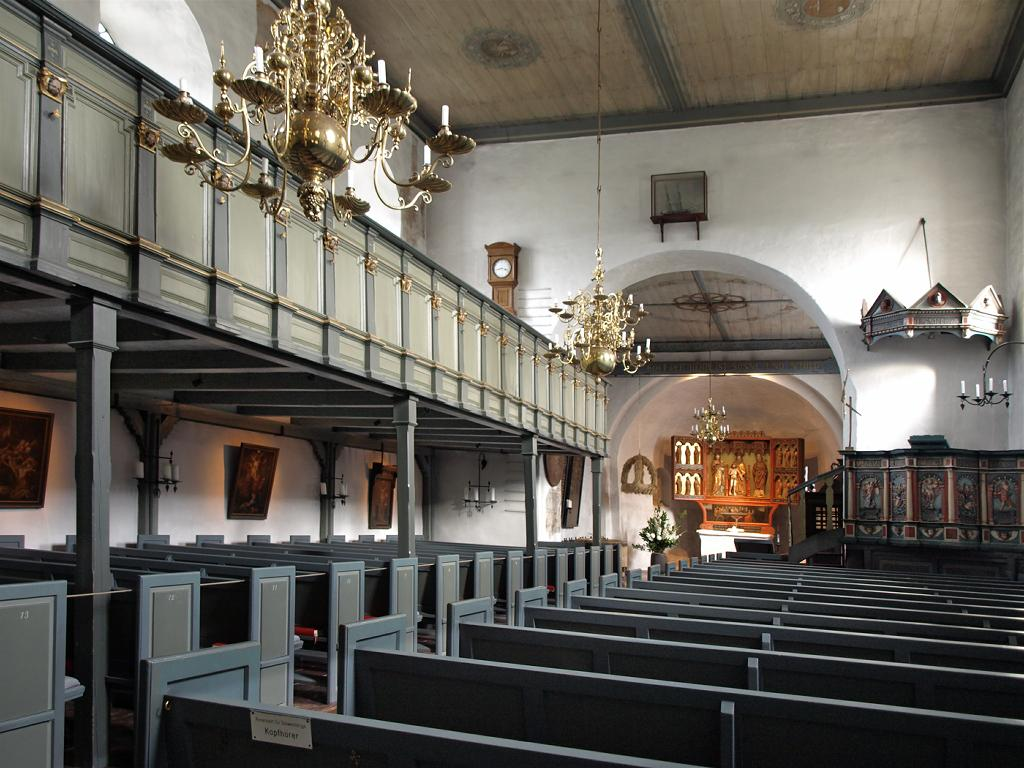
St Severin, Keitum, a German Lutheran church that retains its pre-Reformation carved altarpiece as well as other smaller post-Reformation paintings.

Apart from official destruction of art, there were outbreaks of violent Calvinist iconoclasm – such as the Beeldenstorm in the Low Countries in 1566. During this time, early Anglicanism, falling with the broader Reformed tradition, also removed most religious images and symbols from churches and discouraged their private use. Elizabeth I of England (r. 1558–1603), the Supreme Governor of the Church of England, was one of many Anglicans to exhibit somewhat contradictory attitudes, both ordering a crucifix for her chapel when they were against a law she had approved, and objecting forcefully when the Dean of St Paul's put in the royal pew a service book with "cuts resembling angels and saints, nay, grosser absurdities, pictures resembling the Holy Trinity". Generally, Reformed churches are now more relaxed over the use of religious art and symbols than they were in the Reformation period, though many denominations avoid images in churches and may discourage the interpretation of Biblical texts in symbolic terms.

In the Anglican Church matters such as the use of altar crosses and crucifixes can arouse strong feelings. However while early Anglicans destroyed portraits of saints, portraits of contemporary individuals, including church leaders, were not considered problematic, and exist in large numbers. Reformed Christians did not object to small religious images, typically of episodes from the New Testament, in the form of prints; Bible illustrations or picture books, especially those intended for children, were and continue to be widely used in Protestantism, so that in the 17th century, even "the ordinary Puritan enjoyed a Bible with pictures".

Faced with the Protestant challenge to imagery, then far more virulent than it usually is in the 21st century, the Catholic Counter-Reformation (c. 1545 – c. 1648) reacted by quietly removing some types of medieval imagery that could not be justified theologically, but otherwise by strengthening its commitment to the use of art and images to promote the Christian message, though tightening up on the detailed content of imagery, which the church brought under stricter control.

The virtual end of the production of religious painting in Reformed parts of Europe had the effect of diverting artistic production into secular subjects, especially in Dutch Golden Age painting of the 17th century. While Catholic Europe was still producing Baroque altarpieces in large numbers, the Netherlands produced genre scenes (very often depicting ungodly behavior), still lifes, portraits and landscapes. Moralistic messages were often attached to these, though the subject matter often fights somewhat with them. Protestant religious art, mainly in the form of illustrations of biblical events, continued in printmaking and in book illustrations, for example in the etchings of Rembrandt (1606–1669), who also painted biblical subjects. In the early stages of the Reformation, Protestant propagandists made vigorous use of images satirizing their opponents.

== Among Christians today ==
The Gothic Revival 19th century chapel of Mansfield College, Oxford, an English Calvinist foundation, with statues and stained glass figures of divines of the Reformed tradition

Lutheran churches continue to be ornate, with respect to sacred art:

Lutheran places of worship contain images and sculptures not only of Christ but also of biblical and occasionally of other saints as well as prominent decorated pulpits due to the importance of preaching, stained glass, ornate furniture, magnificent examples of traditional and modern architecture, carved or otherwise embellished altar pieces, and liberal use of candles on the altar and elsewhere.

— Declan Marmion, Salvador Ryan and Gesa E. Thiessen, Remembering the Reformation: Martin Luther and Catholic Theology, page 169

Calvinist aniconism, especially in printed material, and stained glass, can generally be said to have weakened in force, although the range and context of images used are much more restricted than in Catholicism, Lutheranism, or parts of Anglicanism, the latter of which also incorporated many high church practices after the Oxford Movement.

The Methodist and Pentecostal traditions, as well as other Wesleyan-Arminian Evangelical churches, are inspired by the Moravian rather than Calvinist tradition, and are therefore readier to use large crosses and other images, though not with the profusion of traditional Catholicism or Lutheranism. Hence works like the 52 ft tall Lux Mundi statue in Ohio. Bob Jones University, a standard bearer for Protestant Fundamentalism, has a major collection of Baroque old master Catholic altarpieces proclaiming the Counter-Reformation message, though these are in a gallery, rather than in a church.

The Amish and some other Mennonite groups continue to avoid photographs or any depictions of people; their children's dolls usually have blank faces. The Brethren in Christ, another branch of Anabaptism, rejected all use of photography until the mid-20th century.

The Iglesia ni Cristo (Church of Christ) and Members Church of God International, Philippines-based sects with Restorationist-like beliefs, also explicitly forbid the use of any religious image, including the crucifix.

The use of icons and images of Jesus continues to employed in Christian denominations such as Lutherans, Anglicans, Methodists and Catholics. The veneration of icons is a key element of the doxology of the Eastern Orthodox Church which continues to celebrate the Feast of Orthodoxy which originally marked the end of iconoclasm and the reintroduction of images into churches.

In his 2003 book on praying with icons of Christ, Archbishop of Canterbury, Rowan Williams referred to 2 Corinthians 4.6: "the light of the knowledge of the glory of God in the face of Jesus Christ" and wrote that meditation on the icons of Christ "gives us the power to see all things freshly". Williams states that the arguments in favor of the use of images of Christ eventually won over iconoclasm among Christians at large because the use of icons is "so closely connected with the most essential beliefs of Christians about Jesus Christ himself".

In his 29 October 1997 general audience, Pope John Paul II reiterated the statement of Lumen gentium, 67 that: "the veneration of images of Christ, the Blessed Virgin and the saints, be religiously observed". In his 6 May 2009 general audience Pope Benedict XVI referred to the reasoning used by John of Damascus who wrote: "In other ages God had not been represented in images, being incorporate and faceless. But since God has now been seen in the flesh, and lived among men, I represent that part of God which is visible. I do not venerate matter, but the Creator of matter" and stated that it forms part of the theological basis for the veneration of images. The use of significant representations of Jesus has continued among Catholics, e.g. with the 2008 parishioner funded 50 foot statue of Jesus in Mindanao, Philippines.

== See also ==
- Aniconism in Judaism
- Aniconism in Islam
- Iconoclasm
