= Thou shalt not make unto thee any graven image =

One of the Ten Commandments

"Thou shalt not make unto thee any graven image" (Biblical Hebrew: לֹא-תַעֲשֶׂה לְךָ פֶסֶל, וְכָל-תְּמוּנָה, romanized: Lōʾ-ṯaʿăśe lək̲ā p̄esel, wəḵol-təmûnā) is an abbreviated form of the second part of one of the Ten Commandments which, according to the Book of Deuteronomy, were spoken by God to the Israelites and then written on stone tablets by the Finger of God. It continues, "... any graven image, or any likeness [of any thing] that [is] in heaven above, or that [is] in the earth beneath, or that [is] in the water under earth: Thou shalt not bow down thyself to them, nor serve them."

Rabbinical Judaism does not allow images. Christians abide by this law with their own interpretation depending on the denomination. Catholics and Orthodox focus on images and icons rather than idols, sometimes with destruction of images (iconoclasm) occurring, particularly images of Jesus and the saints. Aniconism is a common but not universal aspect of modern Islam.

Although no single biblical passage contains a complete definition of idolatry, the subject is addressed in numerous passages, so that idolatry may be summarized as the strange worship of idols or images; the worship of polytheistic gods by use of idols or images; the worship of created things (trees, rocks, animals, astronomical bodies, or another human being); and the use of idols in the worship of God (YHWH Elohim, the God of Israel). Covetousness is forbidden by the 10th commandment, and as greed is defined as idolatry in the New Testament. When the commandment was given, opportunities to participate in the honor or worship of idols abounded, and the religions of Canaanite tribes neighboring the Israelites often centered on a carefully constructed and maintained cult idol. However, according to the book of Deuteronomy, the Israelites were strictly warned neither to adopt nor adapt any of the religious practices of the peoples around them.

Nevertheless, according to the Hebrew Bible the story of the people of Israel until the Babylonian Captivity includes the violation of this commandment as well as the one before it, "Thou shalt have no other gods before me". Much of biblical preaching from the time of Moses to the exile relates to the choice between the exclusive worshiping of God and the worshiping of other idols. The Babylonian exile seems to have been a turning point after which the Jewish people as a whole were strongly monotheistic and willing to fight battles (such as the Maccabean Revolt) and face martyrdom before paying homage to any other god.

According to the psalmist and the prophet Isaiah, those who worship inanimate idols will be like them, that is, unseeing, unfeeling, unable to hear the truth that God would communicate to them. Paul the Apostle identifies the worship of created things (rather than the Creator) as the cause of the disintegration of sexual and social morality in his letter to the Romans. Although the commandment implies that the worship of God is not compatible with the worship of idols, the status of an individual as an idol worshiper or a God worshiper is not portrayed as predetermined and unchangeable in the Bible. When the covenant is renewed under Joshua, the Israelites are encouraged to throw away their foreign gods and "choose this day whom you will serve". King Josiah, when he becomes aware of the terms of God's covenant, zealously works to rid his kingdom of idols. According to the book of Acts, Paul tells the Athenians that though their city is full of idols, the true God is represented by none of them and requires them to turn away from idols.

== Commandment ==
Thou shalt not make unto thee any graven image, or any likeness of any thing that is in heaven above, or that is in the earth beneath, or that is in the water under earth: Thou shalt not bow down thyself to them, nor serve them: for I the LORD thy God am a jealous God, visiting the iniquity of the fathers upon the children unto the third and fourth generation of them that hate me; And shewing mercy unto thousands of them that love me, and keep my commandments.

— Exodus 20:4–6 (KJV)

לֹֽ֣א תַֽעֲשֶׂ֨ה־לְךָ֥֣ פֶ֣֙סֶל֙׀ וְכָל־תְּמוּנָ֡֔ה אֲשֶׁ֤֣ר בַּשָּׁמַ֣֙יִם֙׀ מִמַּ֡֔עַל וַֽאֲשֶׁ֥ר֩ בָּאָ֖֨רֶץ מִתַָּ֑֜חַת וַאֲשֶׁ֥֣ר בַּמַּ֖֣יִם׀ מִתַּ֥֣חַת לָאָֽ֗רֶץ

לֹֽא־תִשְׁתַּחְוֶ֥֣ה לָהֶ֖ם֮ וְלֹ֣א תָעָבְדֵ֑ם֒ כִּ֣י אָֽנֹכִ֞י יְהוָ֤ה אֱלֹהֶ֙יךָ֙ אֵ֣ל קַנָּ֔א פֹּ֠קֵד עֲוֺ֨ן אָבֹ֧ת עַל־בָּנִ֛ים עַל־שִׁלֵּשִׁ֥ים וְעַל־רִבֵּעִ֖ים לְשֹׂנְאָֽ֑י׃ וְעֹ֥֤שֶׂה חֶ֖֙סֶד֙ לַאֲלָפִ֑֔ים לְאֹהֲבַ֖י וּלְשֹׁמְרֵ֥י מִצְוֺתָֽי׃ ס

— שמות 20:4-6 (WLC)

== Words translated as "graven image" ==
The English words "graven image" or "idol" in translations of the Bible may represent any of several Hebrew words. The word is pesel (פֶסֶל), translated in modern Hebrew as “sculpture” indicating something carved or hewn. In subsequent passages, pesel was applied to images of metal and wood, as well as those of stone. Other terms, such as nēsek and massēkâ, massēbâ, ōseb, and maskit also indicate a material or manner of manufacture.

Some terms represent the consistently negative moral view with which idols are portrayed by the Bible. For example, idols are referred to as "non-God", "things of naught", "vanity", "iniquity", "wind and confusion", "the dead", "carcasses", and "a lie". Other terms are deliberately contemptuous, such as elilim, "powerless ones", and gillulim, "pellets of dung".

== Cultural context ==
The idols of the Ancient Near East were central figures of the tribal cults around the Israelites. They are said to have been placed upon pedestals, clothed and colored, and fastened with chains of silver or nails of iron lest they fall over or be carried off. To demonstrate victory over an enemy's idols, it was customary to take away the idols of the vanquished, and a similar custom is frequently mentioned in the cuneiform texts.

Scholars have discussed whether idol worshipers made a distinction between a spiritual being that existed independently of idols and the physical idols themselves. Some scholars opine that the pagans in the Hebrew Bible did not literally worship the objects themselves, so that the issue of idolatry is really concerned with whether one is pursuing a "false god" or "the true God". In addition to the spiritual aspect of their worship, peoples in the Ancient Near East took great care to physically maintain their cult idols and thought that the instructions for their manufacture and maintenance came from the spirit of the god. Magical ceremonies were performed through which the people believed the spirit of the god came to live in the physical idol. When idols were captured or not cared for, the associated religious practices also flagged. So while scholars may debate the relative importance of belief in the physical object or the spirit it represented or housed, in practice the distinction was not easy to discern.

== Biblical injunctions ==
Idolatry is prohibited in many biblical passages, although there is no single section that contains a complete definition. Rather there are a number of commandments on this subject spread through the books of the Tanakh, and taking these passages together, idolatry may be defined as the worship of idols (or images); the worship of polytheistic gods by use of idols (or images); the worship of created things (trees, rocks, animals, astronomical bodies, or another human being); and even the use of idols in the worship of the God of Israel.

The question has been raised whether the ancient view of this command prohibits images of Yahweh. Some scholars have proposed that the golden calf made by Aaron (while Moses was on the mountain receiving the Ten Commandments) was supposed to represent Yahweh, or perhaps a throne or steed on which the people were to envision Yahweh. It is generally held that the Masoretes altered ʾābı̂r ("bull") to ʾabbı̂r ("mighty one") by changing the pointing (adding a dagesh to the bet), to disguise any association between Yahweh and a bull. Other suggestions are that the calf represents some other god, with El, Baal, and particularly the moon god Sin being proposed. According to Exodus 32:7–8, in a divine speech to Moses, God reveals the events going on at the base of Mt. Sinai to Moses, judging the golden calf to be a violation of the recently revealed law: "They have turned aside quickly from the way that I commanded them". Others point out that the golden calf episode leads to the breaking of the tablets of the Decalogue, something that implies that the covenant had been violated. This event and the plurality of the language used in the second commandment leads many scholars to conclude that it prohibits the making of any image of Yahweh as well as any image of a created thing to which divinity would be ascribed.

In a number of places the ancient texts assert that God has no shape or form and is utterly incomparable; thus no idol, image, idea, or anything in creation could ever capture God's essence. The narrative in Deuteronomy 4 recounts that when the Israelites were visited by God at Mt. Sinai at the time the Ten Commandments were given, they saw no shape or form and this is stated as a reason why any physical representation of the divine is prohibited – no idols of humans, animals, or heavenly bodies were to be made. Rather than use an idol, God chose to reveal himself in words, by working through people, and by working in history.

According to the Book of Joshua, Abraham came from a land and a family that worshiped strange gods. However, when their God revealed himself to Abraham and called him to leave his native land for Canaan, he did so. According to the Book of Genesis, image worship existed in the time of Jacob, from the account of Rachel taking teraphim along with her on leaving her father Laban's house.

As the leadership of Israel passed from Moses to Joshua, the covenant between Israel and God was renewed and warnings were repeated against adapting or adopting the customs of idol worship among the people the Israelites would encounter, on penalty of corporate destruction and loss of the Promised Land. Through the centuries, idolatry became pervasive among the Israelites and supported by many of their kings, despite repeated warnings from the prophets and culminating in the Babylonian Exile. Along with the original warnings was a promise of restoration for those who would turn away from idols and back to God. However, after repeated refusals to turn away from idols over time, God announced through the prophet Jeremiah that the covenant was broken beyond repair and the judgment (Babylonian Captivity) was sure to happen.

The commandments in the Hebrew Bible against idolatry also forbade the adoption of the beliefs and practices of the nations who lived around the Israelites at the time, especially the religions of ancient Mesopotamia, and Egypt. In dozens of passages, the Hebrew Bible refers to specific practices used to worship idols, including the offering of incense, prayers, food, drink, and blood offerings, singing and dancing, cutting one's flesh, bowing down to and kissing the idol, lewd behavior, passing one's children through the fire, cultic male and female prostitution, and human sacrifice, including child sacrifice.

The ancient understanding apparently did not conflict with the artistic rendering of created things, and the Bible describes the Tabernacle, and later the Temple, as having tapestries and objects incorporating cherubim, flowers, fruits, trees, and animals.

However, sometimes objects that God instructed to be made were turned into idols by the Israelites. The Book of Numbers contains a narrative in which God instructed Moses to make a bronze snake as part of addressing a plague of venomous snakes that had broken out among the Israelites as a punishment for sin. The bronze snake is mentioned again in 2 Kings 18; however, rather than remaining a memorial of God's providence, it became an idol that the people named and worshipped. Thus the bronze snake was destroyed in King Hezekiah's reforms.

According to Exodus 25 and 37, the Ark of the Covenant was a rectangular container overlaid with pure gold with two gold cherubim on its cover. It was considered holy; it was kept in the Holy of Holies, the innermost part of the Tabernacle (and later the Temple), was not to be touched directly, and was only to be transported in a prescribed manner. However, it was not to be an object of worship, and when the Israelites carried it into war like a cult idol, assuming it would guarantee victory, they were defeated, suffering 30,000 casualties, and the Ark was captured and taken to the temple of a foreign god.

== Historic violations and prophetic rebukes ==
A narrative in 1 Kings 12:28–30 describes how Jeroboam had golden calves made for places of worship at Bethel and Dan. This was done for political purposes, to distance the allegiance of the Israelites from loyalty to worship in Jerusalem, which was in Judah and ruled by King Rehoboam. The text says, "This thing became a sin", and its establishment was accompanied by several related violations of the covenant with God. The language used by Jeroboam to introduce the worship of these idols to Israel was very similar to that used by Aaron with regard to the golden calf at Mount Sinai. The images themselves were reminiscent of Egyptian gods represented by the bull. According to 1 Kings 13, God sends a prophet from Judah to denounce Jeroboam's actions and predict the coming of King Josiah (290 years later), who would destroy those priests who participated in the idolatrous practices.

Not only did the common people substitute Canaanite gods and worship for the worship of the God of Israel, polytheism and worship of foreign gods became virtually official in both the northern and southern kingdoms despite repeated warnings from the prophets of God.

The Book of Kings gives an account of the great 9th-century BCE contest at Carmel between Yahweh and Baal regarding control of the rain, and hence of deity: Elijah challenges the Israelites "If Yahweh is God, follow him, but if Baal, then follow him." The people remain ambivalent until the victory of Yahweh is clear, at which point they execute the 450 prophets of Baal said to be present. Although the official, polytheistic policy propelled by King Ahab's wife Jezebel was unchanged in the short term, subsequent text indicates that Ahab later turned away from idols back to Yahweh.

The prophetic books (Nevi'im) recount a continuing struggle against idolatry. For example, the biblical prophet Jeremiah complains: "According to the number of thy cities are thy gods, O Judah." Jeremiah, Ezekiel and Hosea referred to Israel's worship of other gods as spiritual adultery: "How I have been grieved by their adulterous hearts, which have turned away from me, and by their eyes, which have lusted after their idols". This led to a broken covenant between Yahweh and Israel and "divorce", manifested as defeat by King Nebuchadnezzar of Babylon followed by exile, from which the northern kingdom never recovered.

The psalmist described idols as being made of gold, silver, wood, and stone. They are described as being only the work of men's hands, unable to speak, see, hear, smell, eat, grasp, or feel, and powerless either to injure or to benefit. The psalmist, and also the prophet Isaiah, warn that worship of such powerless objects is not harmless, however: "Those who worship them will be like them", that is, unseeing, unfeeling, unable to hear the truth that God would communicate to them.

The Bible presents Daniel and his companions as distinct, positive examples of individuals refusing to pay homage to another god, even at the price of their lives. During the time of the exile, Nebuchadnezzar erects a gold statue of himself and commands all subjects to worship it. Three Jewish officials – Shadrach, Meshach, and Abednego – who had been taken to Babylon as youths along with Daniel, refuse to bow to the statue. As they face being burned alive in a furnace, they communicate their faith as well as their resolve: "If we are thrown into the blazing furnace, the God we serve is able to save us from it, and he will rescue us from your hand, O king. But even if he does not, we want you to know, O king, that we will not serve your gods or worship the image of gold you have set up."

== Maccabean revolt ==
After Antiochus IV Epiphanes recaptured Jerusalem in 167 BC, he forbade Torah and introduced worship of foreign gods into the Second Temple, and many Jews were martyred because they refused to acknowledge the claims of Seleucid deities.

== Judaism ==
In Judaism, God chooses to reveal his identity, not as an idol or image, but by his words, by his actions in history, and by his working in and through mankind. Idolatry is one of three sins (along with adultery and murder) the Mishnah says must be resisted to the point of death. By the time the Talmud was written, the acceptance or rejection of idolatry was a litmus test for Jewish identity: "Whosoever denies idols is called a Jew". "Whosoever recognizes idols has denied the entire Torah; and whosoever denies idols has recognized the entire Torah." The Talmud discusses the subject of idolatry in many passages. An entire tractate, the Avodah Zarah ("strange worship") details practical guidelines for interacting with surrounding peoples so as to avoid practicing or even indirectly supporting such worship.

In his works, Philo of Alexandria defended the Jewish view of God against both the emperor-worship of the Roman world and the idolatrous worship of animals by the Egyptians.

Maimonides warned that special objects (such as the mezuzah) and special prayers (such as the shema) are intended to remind people of love for God and his precepts and do not in themselves guarantee good fortune (they are not to become idols).

Although Jews are forbidden in general to mock at anything holy, it is meritorious to deride idols. This apparently originated in ancient times, as some of the several Hebrew words from the Tanakh translated as "idol" are pejorative and even deliberately contemptuous, such as elilim, "powerless ones", and gillulim, "pellets of dung".

Attitudes towards the interpretation of the Commandment changed through the centuries, in that while first century rabbis in Judea objected violently to the depiction of human figures and placement of statues in Temples, third century Babylonian Jews had different views; and while no figural art from first century Roman Judea exists, the art on the Dura synagogue walls developed with no objection from the Rabbis.

== Christianity ==
Although Jesus discussed the Ten Commandments in the Sermon on the Mount, he did not speak directly of issues regarding the meaning of the commandment against idolatry. According to Acts of the Apostles, the apostles discussed the issue of what immediate behavioral changes would be required of gentiles who became followers of Jesus Christ at the Council of Jerusalem. They decided to instruct new converts: "You are to abstain from food sacrificed to idols, from blood, from the meat of strangled animals and from sexual immorality". In his first letter to the Corinthians, Paul clarified this instruction to counsel converts, who were concerned about the fact that much of the meat sold in the marketplace may have been ritually slaughtered on an idol's altar and/or part of it may have been consumed as an offering to an idol. He condemned attendance at idol feasts, where participation was clearly participation with idolatry. However, Paul advised the Corinthians not to be concerned about meat being sold in the general marketplace or served to them at a meal at which they were a guest – as long as it was not advertised as having been sacrificed to an idol and with consideration not to cause offense to another person's conscience. The language used by Paul in these passages is similar to the first two commandments in regular reference to the jealousy of God, sharp warnings against idolatry and idol images, and the identification of Yahweh as creator and the one who delivered the Israelites from Egypt.

In Athens, Paul was greatly distressed to see that the city was full of idols, and in the Areopagus, he presented the God of Israel as the creator of everything, as unique and not represented by any idol. He taught:

Therefore since we are God's offspring, we should not think that the divine being is like gold or silver or stone—an image made by man's design and skill. In the past God overlooked such ignorance, but now he commands all people everywhere to repent. For he has set a day when he will judge the world with justice by the man he has appointed. He has given proof of this to all men by raising him [Jesus] from the dead.

— Acts 17:29–31 (NIV)

In Ephesus, Paul incurred the wrath of silversmiths (who were worried about losing income from decreased sales of idols) when people responded to his preaching and turned away from idol worship. Paul taught that Christians should actively avoid participating in the worship of anything other than God. He considered it common sense that the worship of God and the worship of any other spiritual being are incompatible:

Therefore, my dear friends, flee from idolatry. I speak to sensible people; judge for yourselves what I say ... Do I mean then that a sacrifice offered to an idol is anything, or that an idol is anything? No, but the sacrifices of pagans are offered to demons, not to God, and I do not want you to be participants with demons. You cannot drink the cup of the Lord and the cup of demons too; you cannot have a part in both the Lord's table and the table of demons. Are we trying to arouse the Lord's jealousy? Are we stronger than he?

— 1 Corinthians 10:14, 19–22 (NIV)

The New Testament also uses the term "idol" in reference to conceptual constructs, as in Paul's letter to the church in Colosse: "Put to death, therefore, whatever belongs to your earthly nature: sexual immorality, impurity, lust, evil desires and greed which is idolatry." This expands the scope of that which is included in idolatry to certain behaviors and priorities, which capture attention and regard at the expense of that which is owed to God. (See also Thou shalt have no other gods before me.) Paul warned the Galatians that those who live in idolatry "will not inherit the kingdom of God", and in the same passage associates witchcraft with idolatry. In his letter to the Philippians, he refers to those whose "god is their stomach". In several New Testament scriptures, including the Sermon on the Mount, the term 'idolatry' is applied to the love of money. The apostle James rebukes those who focus on material things, using language similar to that of Old Testament prophets: "When you ask [in prayer], you do not receive, because you ask with wrong motives, that you may spend what you get on your pleasures. You adulterous people, don't you know that friendship with the world is hatred toward God? Anyone who chooses to be a friend of the world becomes an enemy of God".

Paul commended the church in Thessalonica saying, "Your faith in God has become known everywhere ... They tell how you turned to God from idols to serve the living and true God, and to wait for his Son from heaven, whom he raised from the dead—Jesus, who rescues us from the coming wrath." Paul identifies the worship of created things (rather than the Creator) as the cause of the disintegration of sexual and social morality in his letter to the Romans. The apostle Peter and the Book of Revelation also refer to the connection between the worship of other gods and sexual sins, whether metaphorically or literally.

The apostle John wrote simply, "Dear children, keep yourselves from idols".

=== Catholicism ===
Because God's identity and transcendent character are described in Scripture as unique, the teaching of the Catholic Church proscribes superstition as well as irreligion and explains the commandment is broken by having images to which divine power is ascribed as well as in adoring anything that is not God. "Man commits idolatry whenever he honors and reveres a creature in place of God, whether this be gods or demons ... power, pleasure, race, ancestors, the state, money, etc.". The Catholic Church teaches that idolatry extends beyond the worship of images of other gods. "Idolatry rejects the unique Lordship of God; it is therefore incompatible with communion with God". The Catechism commends those who refuse even to simulate such worship in a cultural context and states that "the duty to offer God authentic worship concerns man both as an individual and as a social being".

The Catechism of the Catholic Church notes that this commandment is recalled many times throughout the Bible and quotes passages describing temporal consequences for those who place trust elsewhere than in God:

Scripture constantly recalls this rejection of "idols, [of] silver and gold, the work of men's hands. They have mouths, but do not speak; eyes, but do not see". These empty idols make their worshippers empty: "Those who make them are like them; so are all who trust in them." (Psalm 115:4–5, 8; see also Isaiah 44:9–20; Jeremiah 10:1–16; Daniel 14:1–30). God, however, is the "living God" (Joshua 3:10; Psalm 42:3; etc.) who gives life and intervenes in history.

— Catechism of the Catholic Church 2112

In his exposition of Psalm 96, Augustine of Hippo agreed with the psalmist's description of inanimate idols, and he recalled Paul's words to the Corinthians that sacrifices to such are offered to demons. Rather than alternate deities condemned by monotheism, these demons are portrayed by Augustine as malevolent beings seeking not to rule as much as to seduce people into sharing eternal punishment, much as a twisted criminal might implicate an innocent person to feed his own malevolence.

Anthony of Padua, seeking to reform the inordinate desire for money he observed in some priests, compared to idols those priests who bought and sold offices and abandoned their flocks, using the language of the psalmist and Isaiah to describe them as having eyes but not seeing, having feet but not walking.

=== Protestantism ===
John Calvin, a prolific and influential Reformation scholar, took a straightforward view of idolatry, patterned after the simplicity of the faith of the early apostles:

In one word, their theology was in substance this—There is one God who created all the world, and declared His will to us by Moses and the prophets, and finally by Jesus Christ and His apostles; and we have one sole Redeemer, who purchased us by His blood, and by whose grace we hope to be saved: All the idols of the world are curst, and deserve execration.

— John Calvin, "Enduring Persecution for Christ"

John Wesley preached on the text of the Apostle John: "Dear children, keep yourselves from idols." He thought that John was not referring to idols of the religions around Israel, since through the Babylonian Captivity, a deep abhorrence of such was in the Jewish people and would have been understood by converts. By idols, Wesley interpreted this verse to mean any thing or priority to which one's heart is given rather than to God. He notes that the Apostle John often encouraged love among Christians and realized that it must first be founded on love of God, which is only possible by being separate from the worship of idols:

As there is no firm foundation for the love of our brethren, except the love of God, so there is no possibility of loving God, except we keep ourselves from idols.

— John Wesley

Martin Luther taught that whatever a person places their trust or priorities in, other than God, can become an idol. Rather than scorn the Israelites for falling into the worship of idols, Luther commented that people are spiritual beings, who know there is a divine authority and easily fall into idolatry because of our fallen nature. Knowing truth from idolatry, he explained, depends on the Bible, for without paying attention to the Word of God, people make up God's characteristics to believe that God is in agreement "with such works and worshippings as your devotion and good intention make choice of".

=== Eastern Orthodoxy ===
The Eastern Orthodox Church, like the other churches of Christendom, holds the view that idolatry is contrary to God's will. Albeit often confused with idols, icons are highly revered and prevalent within the Eastern Orthodox Church, and are highly revered as "windows into heaven". The icons are used to help one "focus on the divine things". The Orthodox Church argues that icons "are spiritually necessary", as “the Word became flesh and dwelt among us”, and confirms the belief in dyophysitism.

Byzantine iconoclasm had once been practiced in the majority-Eastern Orthodox population of the Byzantine Empire. In 754, the Council of Hieria had condemned iconography, and posthumously anathematized John of Damascus. In his writing, Three Treatises on the Divine Images, John distinguished the difference between latria and dulia, the former which is veneration (worship) solely reserved to the Trinity. John argued that, in the Old Testament, the Ark of the Covenant was adorned with the statues of cherubim, yet it was not considered idolatry. After periods of iconoclasm and persecution of iconodules in Byzantium, the theology and doctrine on icons, confirmed by John of Damascus, were accepted at the Second Council of Nicaea, and the ecumenical council, and the installation of iconophile Methodios I of Constantinople is commemorated on the Feast of Orthodoxy.

The Orthodox Church fervently condemns idolatry, and considers it to be "partaking in the table of demons".

== See also ==
- Cult image
- Icon
- Murti
- Shirk (Islam)
- Aniconism
  - Aniconism in Christianity
