= Three Treatises on the Divine Images =

8th century theological treatise

- Author: John of Damascus
- Translator: Andrew Louth
- Subject: Theology
- Publication date: 8th century AD
- Pages: 163
- ISBN: 978-0-88141-245-1

The "Treatise on Divine Images" (also known as "Three Apologies Against Those Who Attack the Holy Images", "Three Treatises on the Divine Images", or "On the Divine Images") is a theological work by John of Damascus written in the 8th century in defense of the veneration of icons during the period of Byzantine Iconoclasm.

It is one of the earliest theological defenses of the use of sacred images in Christian worship and is considered foundational for the theology of icons in the Eastern Orthodox and Catholic traditions.

== Background ==
During the early 8th century, the Byzantine Empire experienced a significant theological and political controversy known as iconoclasm—a movement that opposed the use of religious images in churches and in private use. This movement was championed by a number of emperors, notably Leo III the Isaurian, who issued edicts banning icons and ordering their destruction. John of Damascus was a monk living at the Mar Saba monastery, which was under Muslim rule at the time.

== Content and structure ==
The treatise is structured in three discourses (or apologies). Each addresses specific theological objections to icons and offers defenses quoted from Scripture, the teachings of the Church Fathers, and the Incarnation of Christ.

== Key arguments ==
- Defense of the Incarnation: John of Damascus argues that because God became visible in the person of Jesus Christ, it is legitimate to depict Him (the Son) in images. “When the Invisible One becomes visible to flesh, you may then draw a likeness of His form.” (I.8)
- Instructions on what images cannot be made: Damascene quotes the Bible, in which God says "no one may see me and live” in the Biblical Book of Exodus. John argues that "it is impossible to make an image of God who is incorporeal, invisible, immaterial and with neither shape nor circumscription nor apprehension." (II.7)
- Separation of church and state: Damascene argues in II.12 that "it is not for emperors to legislate for the Church", which was written in order to combat the iconoclast Leo III.
- Distinction between worship and veneration: Damascene draws a clear line between "latria" (Greek: "λατρεία")- worship due to God alone- and "proskynesis" ("προσκύνησις": veneration or honor), which can be offered to saints, relics, and icons. John argues that the bowing and veneration offered to the cross when displayed.
- Didactic purpose of icons: Icons are seen as a “book for the illiterate,” a visual means of teaching the truths of the Christian faith, especially in a largely non-literate society.
- Biblical references: Damascene compares the Second Commandment (in Orthodox and most Protestant denominations' count, the First Commandment in Catholicism and Lutheranism) to the command of making cherubim on the Ark of the Covenant.
- Tradition of the Church: He invokes the continuous tradition of the Church from the earliest centuries, including references to catacomb art and writings of Church Fathers who supported the use of sacred images.

== Legacy and influence ==
The Treatise on Divine Images assisted in shaping the theology adopted at the Second Council of Nicaea (787 AD), which restored the veneration of icons and condemned iconoclasm.

According to tradition, the emperor Leo III was successfully able to convince the Muslim caliph that Damascene was a traitor, and John's hand was cut off. John later witnessed the Virgin Mary (also known as the Theotokos) in a dream, in which she reattached his hand to his arm. He is later believed to have fastened a silver copy of his hand and attached it to the riza of an icon of Mary, which is now known as the Trojeručica.
