= Latria =

Adoration directed only to the Holy Trinity

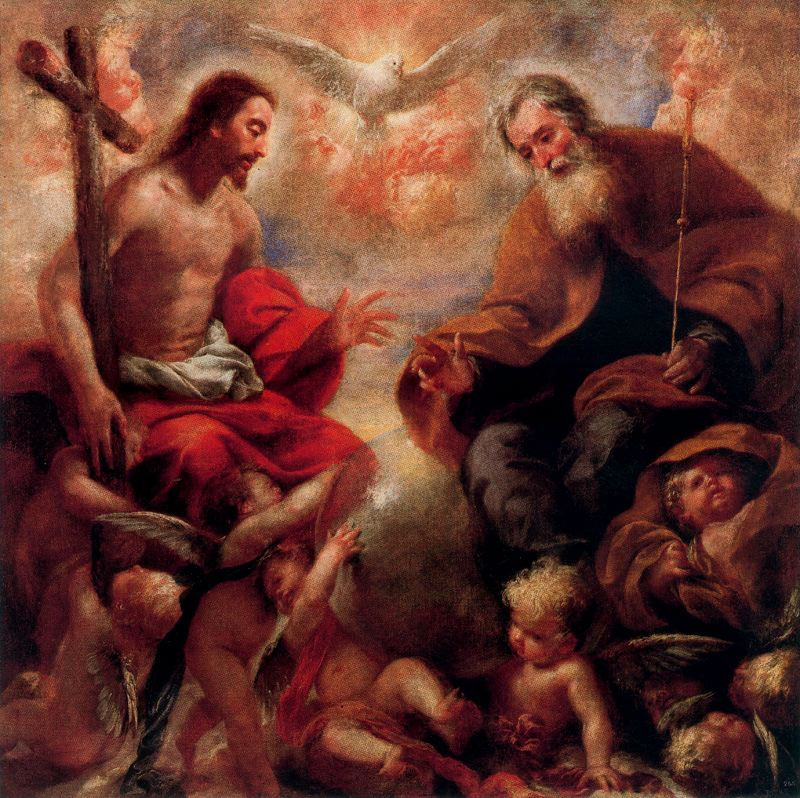
The Holy Trinity by Francesco Cairo (1630)

Latria or latreia (also known as latreutical worship) is a theological term (Latin Latrīa, from the Greek λατρεία, latreia) used in Catholic theology and Eastern Orthodox theology to mean adoration, a reverence directed only to the Holy Trinity. Latria carries an emphasis on the internal form of worship, rather than external ceremonies. Christians took the Greek word λατρεία, present in the Septuagint, into their practice of worship. Latreia, in Greek, means 'service', or 'being in a condition of servitude'. Thus, Christian ministers render service unto God. This Divine Service is worship.

== Eucharist ==
Latria also applies to the Eucharist and Eucharistic adoration. In the 16th century, the Council of Trent made specific affirmations of the presence of Christ in the Eucharist and the theological basis for Eucharistic adoration and stated:

"The only-begotten Son of God is to be adored in the Holy Sacrament of the Eucharist with the worship of "latria", including external worship.

Pope Paul VI's 1965 encyclical Mysterium fidei: also affirmed this belief and in items 56 stated:"The Catholic Church has always displayed and still displays this latria that ought to be paid to the Sacrament of the Eucharist, both during Mass and outside of it".

== Latria, hyperdulia, protodulia and dulia ==
Latria or Adoration is sacrificial in character, and may be offered only to God. Catholic and Orthodox Christians offer other degrees of reverence to the Blessed Virgin Mary, Saint Joseph, John the Baptist, and to the other saints; these non-sacrificial types of reverence are called hyperdulia, protodulia and dulia, respectively. In English, dulia is also called veneration. Hyperdulia is essentially a heightened degree of dulia provided only to the Blessed Virgin.

This distinction, written about as early as Augustine of Hippo and St Jerome, was detailed more explicitly by Thomas Aquinas in his Summa Theologiae, AD 1270: "Reverence is due to God on account of His Excellence, which is communicated to certain creatures not in equal measure, but according to a measure of proportion; and so the reverence which we pay to God, and which belongs to latria, differs from the reverence which we pay to certain excellent creatures; this belongs to dulia, and we shall speak of it further on (103)"; in this next article St. Thomas Aquinas writes: "Wherefore dulia, which pays due service to a human lord, is a distinct virtue from latria, which pays due service to the Lordship of God. It is, moreover, a species of observance, because by observance we honor all those who excel in dignity, while dulia properly speaking is the reverence of servants for their master, dulia being the Greek for servitude".

== Protestant critique of dulia ==
New Testament scholar James Dunn discusses the tradition of Catholic dulia in Augustine and Aquinas, mentioning that the New Testament's use of δουλεία (pronounced dulia) is always used negatively. He states:

"douleia occurs only in the sense of 'slavery, servility', and always in a negative sense – the slavery to physical corruption (Rom. 8.21), slavery to the law (Gal. 5.1), slavery to the fear of death (Heb. 2.15)."

Bill Mounce overviews the New Testament's use of δουλεία with the following chart:

Romans 8:15	For you did not receive the spirit of slavery (douleias | δουλείας | gen sg fem) leading back to fear, but you received the Spirit of adoption. By him we cry out, "Abba! Father!"
Romans 8:21	that the creation itself will be set free from its bondage (douleias | δουλείας | gen sg fem) to decay into the glorious freedom of the children of God.
Galatians 4:24	This may be interpreted allegorically, for these women represent two covenants. One is from Mount Sinai, bearing children to be slaves (douleian | δουλείαν | acc sg fem); she is Hagar.
Galatians 5:1	For freedom Christ has set us free. Stand firm, therefore, and do not be subject again to a yoke of slavery (douleias | δουλείας | gen sg fem).
Hebrews 2:15	and liberate those who throughout life were held in (douleias | δουλείας | gen sg fem) slavery (douleias | δουλείας | gen sg fem) by their fear of death.

== Linguistic distinctions in English ==
The word worship is derived from the West Saxon dialect noun weorðscipe 'condition of being worthy', which is from weorð 'worthy' + -scipe '-ship'. The word worship is used in a strong sense in relation to God (latria), but also in a weak sense in relation to man: for instance, "His Worship the Mayor", or "Your Worship" (when addressing a magistrate in Court), or the worship of the saints (dulia) as distinct to the adoration of God (latria). Adoration provides a clear and unequivocal, and therefore better, translation of latria and expression of the absolute sacrificial reverence due to God alone.

"This worship called forth by God, and given exclusively to Him as God, is designated by the Greek name latreia (Latinized, latria), for which the best translation that our language affords is the word Adoration. Adoration is different from other acts of worship, such as supplication, confession of sin, etc., inasmuch as it formally consists in self-abasement before the Infinite, and in devout recognition of His transcendent excellence."

Roman Catholic and Eastern Orthodox Christians especially adore with latria during their religious service, the Mass or Divine Liturgy. Catholics consider themselves to literally participate in the sacrifice at the foot of Calvary, that what Christ offered once "participates in the divine eternity", while Methodists teach that Holy Communion is a type of sacrifice that re-presents the sacrifice of Christ on the Cross; with regard to the Eucharist, the Methodist churches further teach that:

We also present ourselves as sacrifice in union with Christ (Romans 12:1; 1 Peter 2:5) to be used by God in the work of redemption, reconciliation, and justice. In the Great Thanksgiving, the church prays: "We offer ourselves in praise and thanksgiving as a holy and living sacrifice, in union with Christ's offering for us ..." (UMH; page 10).

A formal statement by the USCCB affirms that "Methodists and Catholics agree that the sacrificial language of the Eucharistic celebration refers to 'the sacrifice of Christ once-for-all', to 'our pleading of that sacrifice here and now,' to 'our offering of the sacrifice of praise and thanksgiving,' and to 'our sacrifice of ourselves in union with Christ who offered himself to the Father.'"

== See also ==
- Proskynesis
