= Aniconism =

Banning of material representations

Aniconism is the cultural absence of artistic representations (icons) of the natural and supernatural worlds, or it is the absence of representations of certain figures in religions. The prohibition of material representations may only extend to a specific supreme deity, or it can encompass an entire pantheon, it can also include depictions of a prophet, saints, or sages, or even depictions of living beings and anything in existence generally. It is generally codified by religious traditions and as such, it becomes a taboo. When it is enforced by the physical destruction of images, aniconism becomes iconoclasm.

Aniconism has historical phases in both Buddhism and Christianity, though these movements have been largely rejected as Buddha in art, life of Buddha in art, Buddhas and bodhisattvas in art, God the Father in Western art, Holy Spirit in Christian art, the depiction of Jesus, The Trinity in art, and Manus Dei are common. By contrast Islam has predominantly been aniconistic throughout their histories, including representations of major figures such as Muhammad. The view of aniconism in Judaism has been challenged, with a number of medieval Ashkenazi illuminated manuscripts collected by David Kaufmann. The earliest phases of ancient Greek religion were rich in aniconic representation, even though Greek mythology is heavily anthropomorphic.

The word "aniconism" is derived from Greek εικων 'image' with the negative prefix an- (Greek privative alpha) and the suffix -ism (Greek -ισμος). Iconoclasm is the active destruction of images for religious or cultural reasons.

== General aspects ==
In monotheistic religions, aniconism was shaped by theological considerations and historical contexts. It emerged as a corollary in which people believed that God was the ultimate power holder, and people who practiced it believed that they needed to defend God's unique status against competing external and internal forces, such as pagan idols and critical humans. Idolatry was seen as a threat to God's uniqueness, and one way in which prophets and missionaries chose to fight against it was through the prohibition of physical representations. The same solution worked against humans who pretended to have the same power of creation that God had (hence, their banishment from the Heavens, the destruction of Babel, and the Second Commandment in the biblical texts).

Some modern scholars who have studied various cultures have gathered material which shows that in many cases, the idea of aniconism is an intellectual construction rather than a fact of tangible reality, it suits specific intents and historical contexts.

== In Buddhism ==
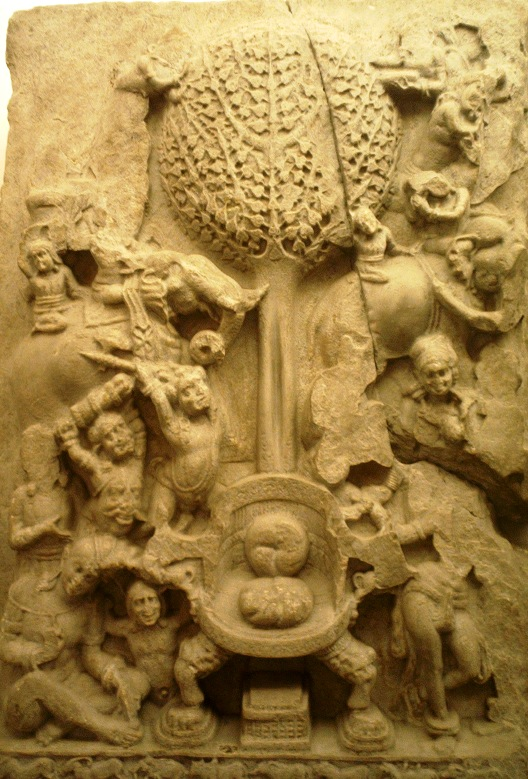
An aniconic representation of Mara's assault on the Buddha, 2nd century CE, Amaravati, India.

Since the beginning of the serious study of the history of Buddhist art in the 1890s, the earliest phase, which lasted until the 1st century CE, has been described as aniconistic; the Buddha was only represented with symbols such as an empty throne, a Bodhi tree, a riderless horse with a parasol floating above an empty space (at Sanchi), Buddha's footprints, and the dharma wheel. However, other persons and their surroundings are often depicted in great numbers and care, and the scenes are often crowded, but with an empty space in the centre.

In relation to the image of the Buddha, this aniconistic tradition could have been based on an ancient Buddhist rule which prohibited images of the Buddha in which he appeared in human form, a rule which is written in the Sarvastivada vinaya (the rules of the early Buddhist school of the Sarvastivada): "Since it is not permitted to make an image of the Buddha's body, I pray that the Buddha will grant that I can make an image of the attendant Bodhisattva. Is that acceptable?" The Buddha answered: "You may make an image of the Bodhisattava".

Although they are still a subject of debate, the first anthropomorphic representations of the Buddha are frequently considered a result of the Greco-Buddhist interaction, a cultural exchange which was particularly widespread in Gandhara, a theory which was first fully expounded upon by Alfred A. Foucher, but from the start, it was criticized by Ananda Coomaraswamy. Foucher also accounted for the origins of the aniconistic symbols by collecting small souvenirs which he removed from the main pilgrimage sites and carried away, souvenirs which were later recognized and popularized as symbols of the events which occurred at the site. Other explanations stated that it was inappropriate to represent a person who had attained nirvana.

However, in 1990, the notion of aniconism in Buddhism was challenged by Susan Huntington, initiating a vigorous debate among specialists that still continues to occur. She sees many early scenes claimed to be aniconic as in fact not depicting scenes from the life of the Buddha, but worship of cetiya (relics) or re-enactments by devotees at the places where these scenes occurred. Thus the image of the empty throne shows an actual relic-throne at Bodh Gaya or elsewhere. She points out that there is only one indirect reference for a specific aniconic doctrine in Buddhism to be found, and that pertaining to only one sect.

As for the archeological evidence, it shows that some anthropomorphic sculptures of the Buddha actually existed during the supposedly aniconistic period, which ended during the 1st century CE. Huntington also rejects the association of "aniconistic" and "iconic" art with the division that emerged between Theravada and Mahayana Buddhism. Huntington's views have been challenged by Vidya Dehejia and others. Although some earlier examples of them have been found in recent years, it is widely-believed that the large free-standing iconic images of the Buddha which are so prevalent in later works of Buddhist art are not prevalent in works of Buddhist art which were produced during the earliest period of the history of Buddhism; discussion is focused on smaller figures in relief panels, conventionally considered to represent scenes from the life of the Buddha, and now re-interpreted by Huntington and her supporters.

== In Hinduism ==
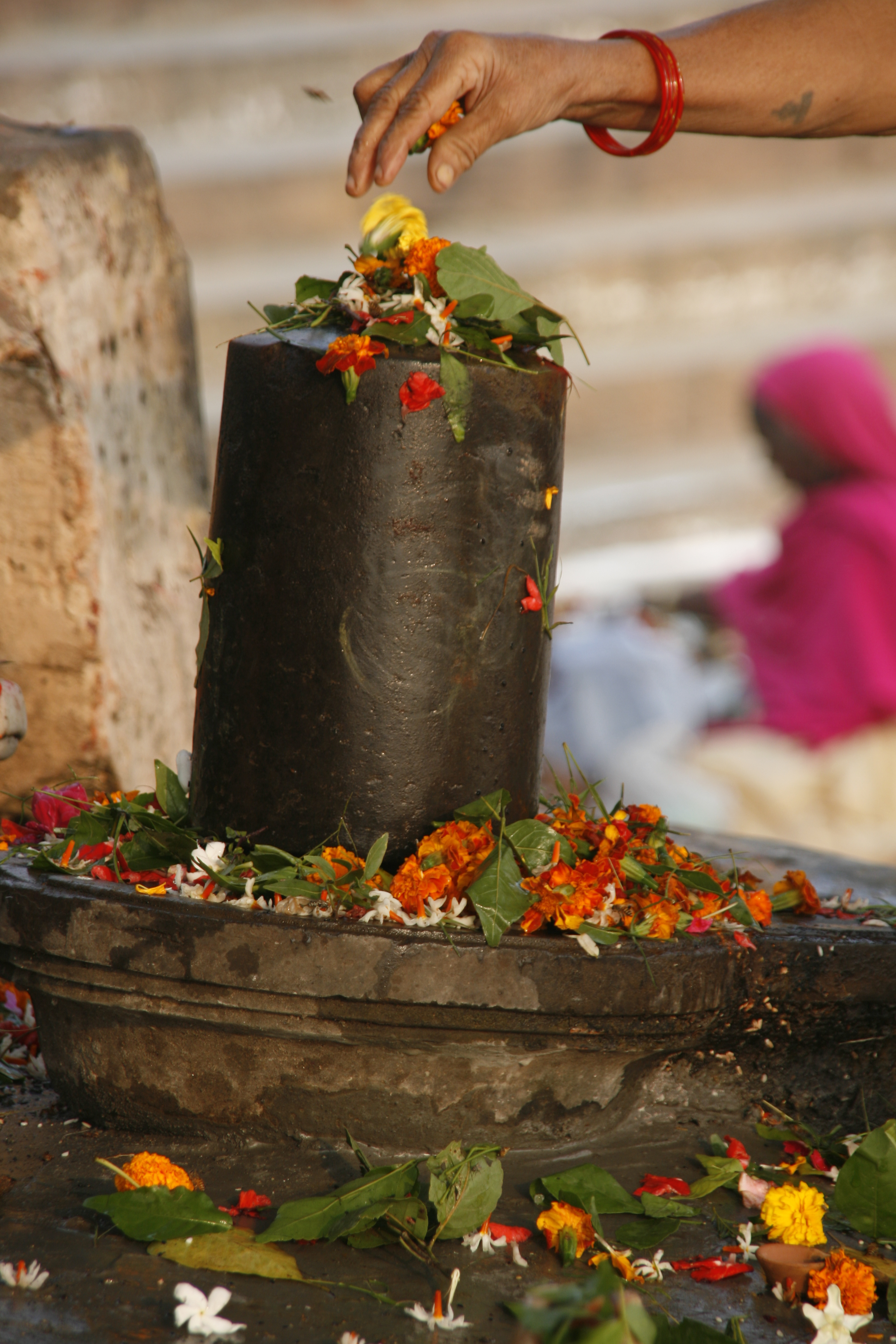
Traditional flower offering to the aniconic Shiva linga in Varanasi

Although aniconism is better known in connection to Abrahamic religions, basic patterns are shared between various religious beliefs including Hinduism, which also has aniconistic beliefs. For example, although Hinduism is commonly represented by such anthropomorphic religious murtis, aniconism is equally represented with such abstract symbols of God such as the Shiva linga and the saligrama. Moreover, Hindus have found it easier to focus on anthropomorphic icons, Krishna says in the Bhagavad Gita that it is much more difficult to focus on God as the unmanifested than God with form, because human beings have a need to perceive via the senses.

== In Christianity ==
=== Byzantine iconoclasm ===
There were two periods of iconoclasm, or icon-destruction, in the Byzantine Empire, in the mid eighth and early ninth centuries. The political aspects of the conflicts are complex, dealing with the relationship between the Byzantine Emperors, the Catholic Church and Orthodox Church councils, and the Pope. Theologically, the debate, as with most in Orthodox theology at the time, revolved around the two natures of Jesus. Iconoclasts believed that icons could not represent both the divine and the human natures of the Messiah at the same time, but separately. Because an icon which depicted Jesus as purely physical would be Nestorianism, and one which showed Him as both human and divine would not be able to do so without confusing the two natures into one mixed nature, which was Monophysitism, all icons were thus heretical. Reference was also made to the prohibitions on the worship of graven images in the Law of Moses.

=== During the Protestant Reformation ===
Aniconism was also prevalent during the Protestant Reformation, when some Protestants began to preach rejection of what they perceived as idolatrous Catholic practices which filled its churches with pictures, statues, or relics of saints. The Reformed (Calvinist) churches and certain sects (most notably the Puritans and some of the Baptist churches) began to prohibit the display of religious images. There were aggressive campaigns of iconoclasm, or the destruction of images (and often much else); the most famous is perhaps the Beeldenstorm in the Netherlands in 1566, where the attacks were mostly on churches that were still Catholic.

=== Among Christians today ===
In the Church of the East, also known as the Nestorian church, opposition to religious images eventually became the norm due to the rise of Islam in the region, where it forbade any type of depictions of saints and biblical prophets. As such, the Church was forced to get rid of their icons. This tradition is still in practice today, with many Assyrian churches lacking artistic depictions of biblical figures, including those of Jesus and Mary.

Some Amish prefer not to have their photo taken. This has been attributed to the Biblical commandment "Thou shalt not make unto thyself a graven image," and the belief that photographs can "steal your soul," among other reasons. Modern Amish differ in their attitudes towards photography, with some accepting it as a part of the modern world around them.

Among Jehovah's Witnesses, followers are prohibited from wearing religious themed jewelry displaying icons such as the cross, as idol worship is prohibited. Having images or sculptures of Jesus, Jehovah (God), and angels is also considered a taboo according to their interpretation of Exodus 20:4,5 and 1 Corinthians 10:14. Followers are also admonished to avoid any objects portraying depictions of the supernatural.

== In Islam ==
=== Theological views ===
The Quran, the Islamic holy book, does not explicitly prohibit the depiction of human figures; it merely condemns idolatry (e.g.: 5:92, 21:52). Interdictions of figurative representation are present in the Hadith, among a dozen of the hadith recorded during the latter part of the period when they were being written down. Because these hadith are tied to particular events in the life of Muhammad, they need to be interpreted in order to be applied in any general manner. Sunni exegetes, from the 9th century onward, increasingly saw in them categorical prohibitions against producing and using any representation of living beings. There are variations between religious schools and marked differences between different branches of Islam. Aniconism is common among fundamentalist Sunni sects such as Salafis and Wahhabis (which are also often iconoclastic), and less prevalent among liberal movements in Islam. Shi'a and mystical orders also have less stringent views on aniconism. On the individual level, whether or not specific Muslims believe in aniconism may depend on how much credence is given to hadith (e.g. Submitters do not believe in any hadith), and how liberal or strict they are in personal practice.

Aniconism in Islam not only deals with the material image, but touches upon mental representations as well. It is a thorny question, discussed by early theologians, as to how to describe God, Muhammad and other prophets, and, indeed, if it is permissible at all to do so. God is usually represented by immaterial attributes, such as "holy" or "merciful", commonly known from His "Ninety-nine beautiful names". Muhammad's physical appearance, however, is amply described in the literary tradition of his biography (Sīrah). In the Ottoman Empire, descriptions of Muhammad's physical appearance became a genre unto themselves, called Hilya.

=== Aniconism in practice ===
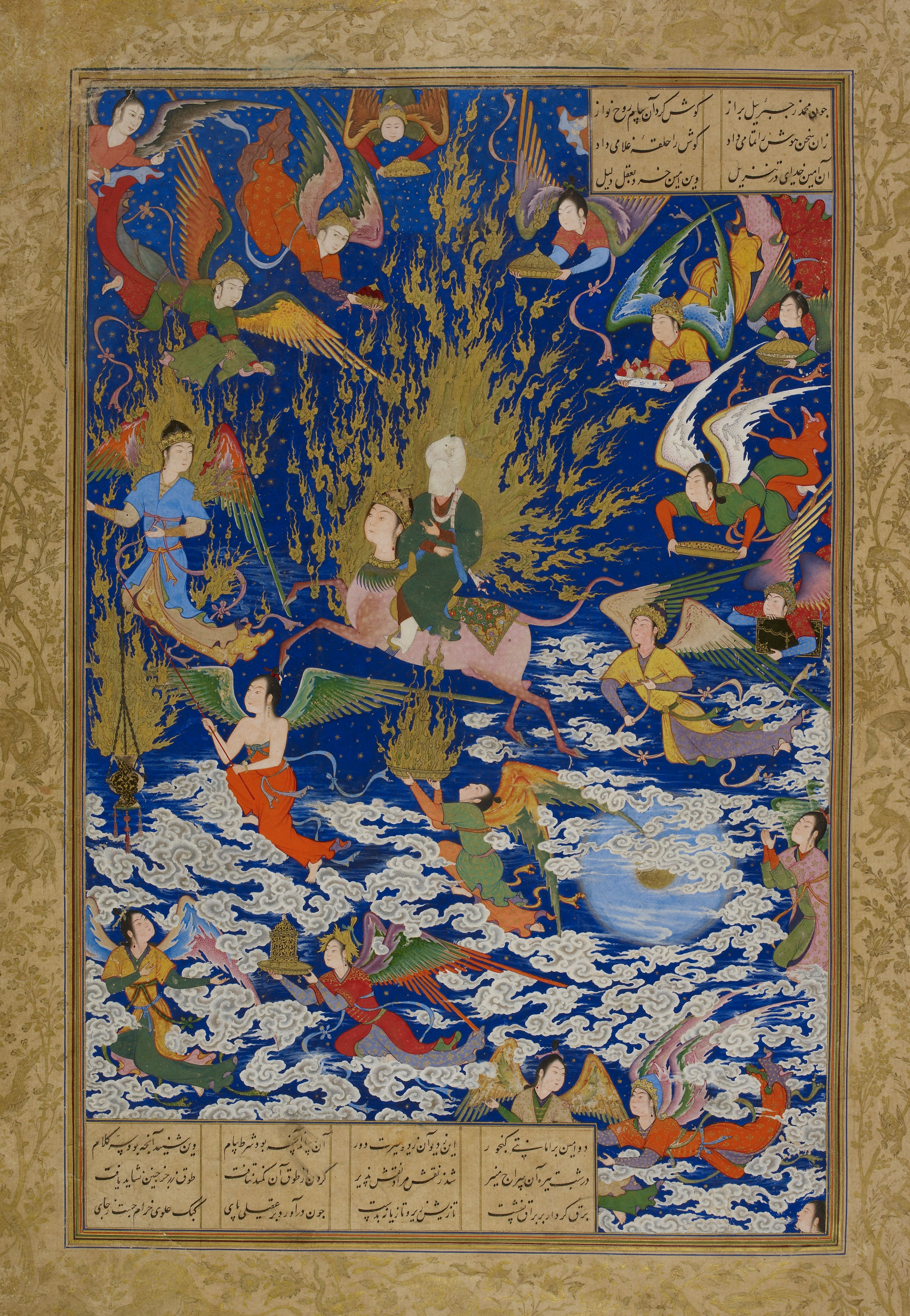
Persian miniature painting from the 16th century AD, depicting Muhammad, his face veiled, ascending on the Buraq into the Heavens, a journey known as the Mi'raj.

In practice, the core of normative religion in Islam is consistently aniconic. Its embodiment are spaces such as the mosque and objects like the Qur'an or the white dress of pilgrims entering Mecca, deprived of figurative images. Other spheres of religion – schisms, mysticism, popular piety, private level – exhibit in this regard significant variability. Profane aniconism is even more fluctuating. Generally speaking aniconism in Islamic societies is restricted in modern times to specific religious contexts, while its prevalence in the past wasn't enforced in numerous areas and during extended periods.

Depending on which segment of Islamic societies are referred to, the application of aniconism is characterized with noteworthy differences. Factors are the epoch considered, the country, the religious orientation, the political intent, the popular beliefs, the private benefit or the dichotomy between reality and discourse. Today, the concept of an aniconic Islam coexists with a daily life for Muslims awash with images. TV stations and newspapers (which do present still and moving representations of living beings) have an exceptional impact on public opinion, sometimes, as in the case of Al Jazeera, with a global reach, beyond the Arabic-speaking and Muslim audience. Portraits of secular and religious leaders are omnipresent on banknotes and coins, in streets and offices. Anthropomorphic statues in public places are to be found in most Muslim countries (Saddam Hussein's are infamous), as well as arts schools training sculptors and painters. In the Egyptian countryside, it is fashionable to celebrate and advertise the returning of pilgrims from Mecca on the walls of their houses. Sometimes those who profess aniconism will practice figurative representation (cf. portraits of Taliban fighters from the Kandahar photographic studios during their imposed ban on photography). For Shi'a communities, portraits of the major figures of Shi'ite history are important elements of religious devotion. Portraits of 'Ali – with veiled and unveiled face alike – can be bought in Iran around shrines and in the streets, to be hung in homes or carried with oneself, while in Pakistan, India and Bangladesh they notoriously ornate trucks, buses and rickshas. Contrary to the Sunni tradition, a photographic picture of the deceased can be placed on the Shi'ite tombs. A curiosity in Iran is an Orientalist photograph supposed to represent Muhammad as a young boy. The Grand Ayatollah Sistani of Najaf in Iraq gave a fatwa declaring the depiction of Muhammad, Islamic prophets and other characters considered holy, permissible if it is made with the utmost respect.

Neither is the representation of living beings in Islamic countries a modern phenomenon or due to current technology, westernization or the cult of the personality. Statues of humans and animals adorned palaces of the Umayyad era, while frescoes were common under the Umayyads, and later in many Muslim countries, notably under the Safavids and various Central Asian dynasties. Figurative miniatures from Medieval Arabic countries, India, Persia and Turkey are among the pinnacles of Islamic art and account for a good deal of its attraction. Potent rulers like Shah Tahmasp in Persia and Akbar in India, patrons of some of the most beautiful figurative miniatures in arts from Islamic countries, migrated during their life between an extravagant 'figurative' and an extremist 'aniconic' period. During the 15th and 17th century representations of Muhammad (veiled, unveiled) and other prophets or Biblical characters, like Adam, Abraham or Jesus; and Solomon and Alexander the Great, became common in painted manuscripts from Persia, India and Turkey. Extreme rarities are an illustrated Qur'an depicting Muhammad and, in a Spanish-Muslim manuscript datable from the 16th century, five Umayyad and Abbasid caliphs. Iblis too is present in various illustrated manuscripts. However, there are no known figurative depictions of God.

Medieval Muslim artists found various ways not to infringe any prohibition of the image, while still representing living beings. It can be argued that since God is absolute, the act of depiction is his own and not that of a human; and miniatures are obviously very crude representations of the reality, so the two can't be mistaken. At the material level, prophets in manuscripts can have their face covered by a veil or all humans have a stroke drawn over their neck, a symbolic cut preventing them from being alive. Calligraphy, the most Islamic of arts in the Muslim world, has also its figurative side due to anthropo- and zoomorphic calligrams.

== In Judaism ==
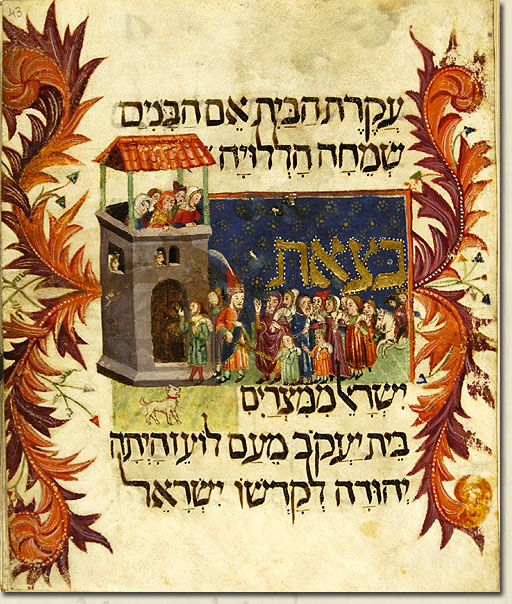
14th-century hagaddah depicting Moses leading the people (David Kaufmann collection)

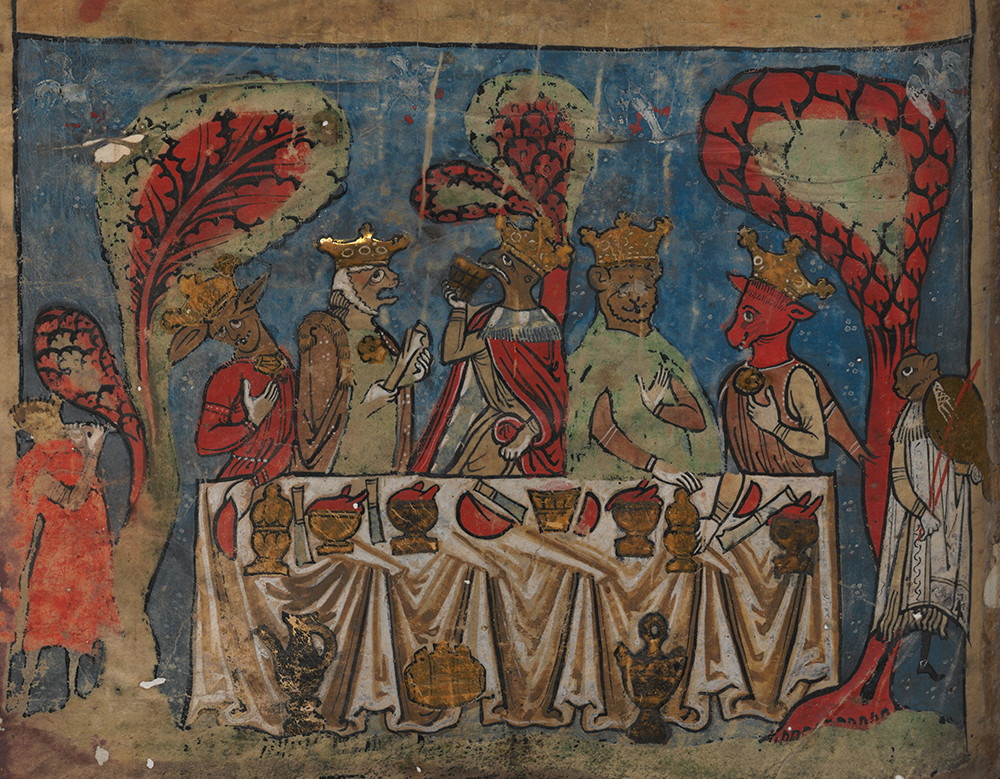
The Feast of the Righteous, detail of fol. 136r, Ambrosian Tanakh, c. 1236–38, Biblioteca Ambrosiana

The view that Judaism is an aniconic religion was challenged by David Kaufmann, who marshalled an extensive and comprehensive corpus of data to prove that this view was untenable. He was the first to use the term "Jewish art" in an article he published in 1878, and he is also considered the founder of the scholarly discipline of Jewish art history. In 1901, his disciple Samuel Krauss wrote:

As late as ten years ago, it would have been absurd to speak about a Jewish art. It is Kaufmann's own merit to have uncovered this art. Not only did he have to prove that such an art existed, he also had to prove that it could exist, as he showed that the idea that the prohibition of images would obstruct the development of such an art was mistaken, and even established it as an irrefutable fact that the art in wide areas was not prohibited insofar as no worship was associated with it.

In a refutation of the belief in an aniconistic form of Judaism, and more generally in an underestimation of Jewish visual arts, the historian of ideas Kalman Bland proposed that the phenomenon is a modern construction, stating that "Jewish aniconism crystallized simultaneously with the construction of modern Jewish identities". Others have also argued that the notion of a total prohibition of figural representation in the biblical era and Hellenistic-Roman period is untenable.

Some illustrations from the Middle Ages feature fantastic creatures—usually animal-headed humanoids—even when the depictions are quite clearly meant to be those of historical or mythological humans, known as zoocephalic figures. A well-known example is the German Birds' Head Haggadah (c. 1300). Although it is theorized that zoocephalic art is intended to circumvent this prohibition, the presence of human faces in some manuscripts casts doubt on this assumption. The reasons for this illustration style are not fully understood.

The Ambrosian Bible or Ambrosian Tanakh of 1236 by Jacob ben Samuel and Joseph ben Kalonymus is one of the earliest Ashkenazic illuminated manuscripts and biblical codices. It contains figural representations and depictions of biblical figures such as Adam and Eve, Abraham, Isaac, Jacob (or Joseph), Moses, Solomon, David, and others. Some of the figures appear with faces obscured or zoocephalic. It was made for a patron probably from Ulm.

=== Hebrew Bible ===
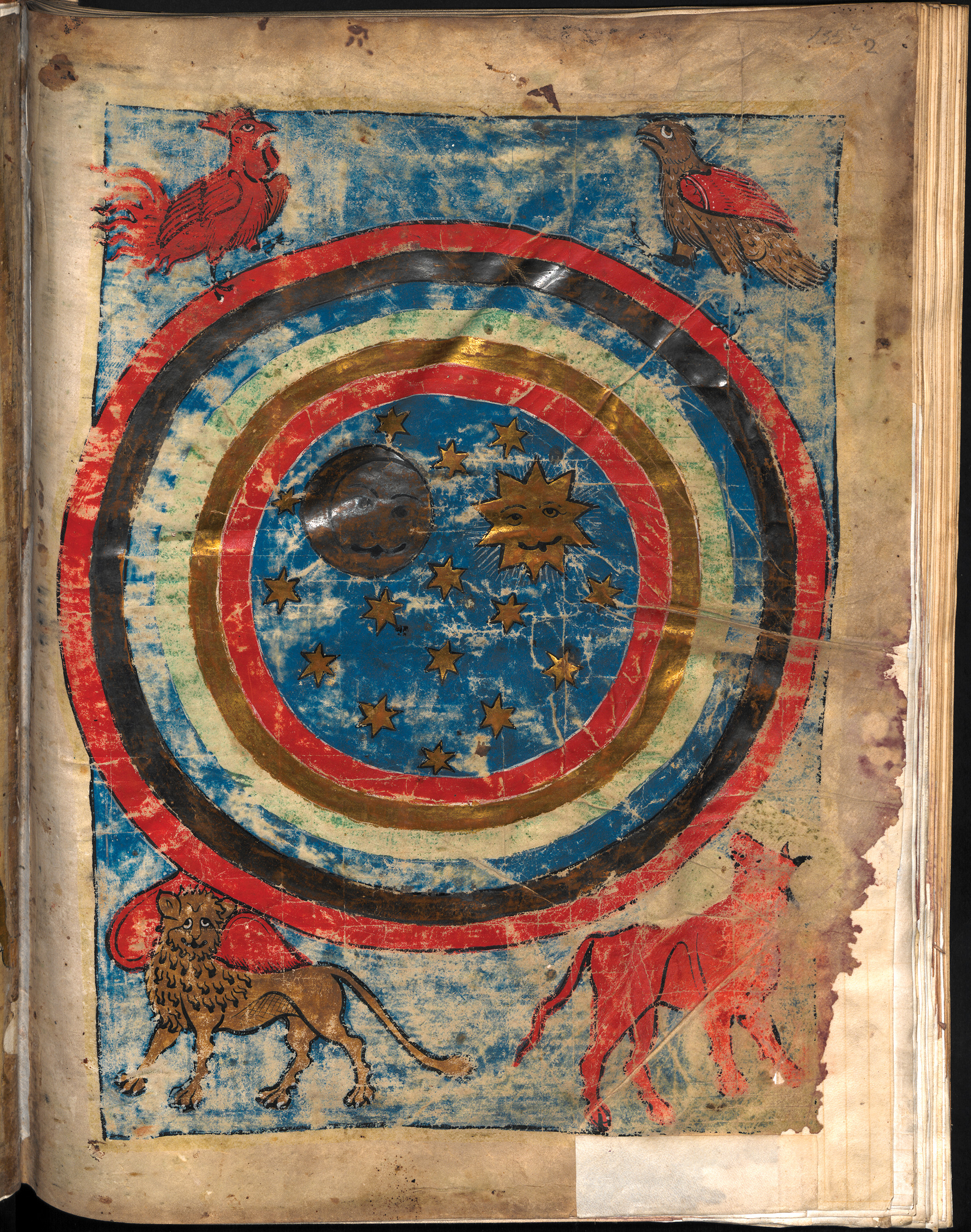
The Vision of Ezekiel, fol. 135v, Ambrosian Tanakh, ca. 1236–38, Biblioteca Ambrosiana

A number of verses in the Hebrew Bible (Tanakh) refer to prohibitions against the creation of graven images, which are invariably linked directly to idolatry. The strongest source, Exodus 20:3–6, is based on what Judaism counts as the second of the Ten Commandments:

Thou shalt not make unto thee a graven image, nor any manner of likeness, of any thing that is in Heaven above, or that is in the earth beneath, or that is in the water under the earth; thou shalt not bow down unto them, nor serve them; for I the LORD thy God am a jealous God, visiting the iniquity of the fathers upon the children unto the third and fourth generation of them that hate Me; and showing mercy unto the thousandth generation of them that love Me and keep My commandments.

Another source is Leviticus 26:1:

Ye shall make you no idols, neither shall ye rear you up a graven image, or a pillar, neither shall ye place any figured stone in your land, to bow down unto it; for I am the LORD your God.

=== Orthodox Halakha ===
Despite the semantic association with idols, Halakha (Jewish law), at least as codified in the Shulkhan Aruch, interprets the verses as prohibiting the creation of certain types of graven images of people, angels, or astronomical bodies, whether or not they are actually used as idols. Joseph Karo, the compiler of the Shulkhan Aruch, writes in Yoreh De'ah 139: "It is forbidden to make complete solid or raised images of people or angels, or any images of heavenly bodies except for purposes of study". Karo translates פֶּסֶל (pésel) as "graven image", which is from the root פּ־ס־ל (p-s-l); 'to engrave'). The Orthodox Jewish community, therefore, sees the prohibition as applying specifically to certain forms of sculpture and depictions of the human face. It is thought that illustrations from the Middle Ages of zoocephalic figures, such as in the Birds' Head Haggadah, do not violate this prohibition. Because such creatures as griffins, harpies, sphinxes, and the phoenix do not actually exist, no violation of the prohibition is perceived in such depictions. This is based on the fact that the commandment, as stated in the book of Exodus, refers specifically to "anything in the heaven above, on the earth below, or in the water below the land." However, it is forbidden, per the Kitzur Shulchan Aruch, to make the four faces on the Divine Chariot described in the book of Ezekiel or the ministering angels, because these are believed to be real beings that actually exist "in the heaven above."

== In the Baháʼí Faith ==
Like other Abrahamic religions, depictions of God are prohibited in the Bahá’í Faith and Bahá’í Houses of Worship are devoid of statues or images. Photographs and depictions of the Báb and Bahá'u'lláh, who are considered Manifestations of God, are considered very precious. They are viewed and handled with reverence and respect, and their existence itself is not considered offensive. However, Shoghi Effendi, the Guardian of the Baháʼí Faith, stated that believers should only view the images when they can be treated with the utmost respect, and not let them be exposed to the public or displayed in their private homes:

There is no objection that the believers look at the picture of Bahá'u'lláh, but they should do so with the utmost reverence, and should also not allow that it be exposed openly to the public, even in their private homes.

— (From a letter written on behalf of Shoghi Effendi to an individual believer, December 6, 1939, republished in Lights of Guidance, p. 540)

Shoghi Effendi has also written in the Directives from the Guardian regarding the portrait of the Báb:

The portrait of the Báb should be regarded as an inestimable privilege and blessing to behold, as past generations were denied a glimpse of the Face of the Manifestation, once He had passed on."

— (Shoghi Effendi, Directives from the Guardian, p. 43)

Two pictures of Bahá'u'lláh and a portrait of the Báb are on display at the Baháʼí World Centre in the International Archives building, where the Baháʼís view it as part of an organized Baháʼí pilgrimage.

== Other religions ==
In Africa aniconism varies from culture to culture from elaborate masks and statues of humans and animals to their total absence. A common feature, however, across the continent, is the refusal to give the "High God" a material shape.

About the Germanic tribes, the Roman historian Tacitus writes the following: "They don't consider it mighty enough for the Heavens to depict Gods on walls or to display them in some human shape." His observation was not general to all the Germanic peoples (or, similar to the Greeks, it evolved after his time) as documentary evidence suggests (see Ardre image stones).

In the ancient Etruscan religion, the dii involuti or "veiled gods", a group of gods who were superior to the ordinary pantheon and regulated the infliction of disasters, were never named or depicted. Depictions of gods more generally were infrequent in Etruscan civilization until after the adoption of Greek influences in the "Orientalizing" period of the 7th–6th centuries BC, and sometimes carried negative associations, their faces in particular. An Etruscan divination calendar describes being "visited with visions of the faces of the gods" as a negative event.

In some Australian Aboriginal cultural groups, the "naming and depiction of recently deceased people is often prohibited under customary law and the mourning period may last for weeks, months or years". It is believed that depicting them will inhibit their passage to the Great Dreaming of the Ancestors. Some broadcasters (such as the ABC) include content warnings in programs or articles that depict Aboriginal people. The prohibition does not apply to the depiction of non-Aboriginal people who are deceased.

== See also ==
- Censorship
  - Censorship by organized religion
- Jyllands-Posten Muhammad cartoons controversy
