= David Kaufmann =

Austrian academic (1852–1899)

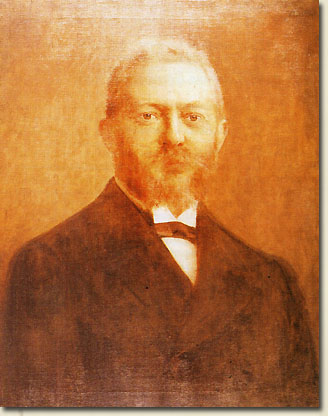
David Kaufmann (1852–1899), portrait by Izidor Thein.

David Kaufmann (7 June 1852 – 6 July 1899) (Hebrew: דוד קויפמן) was a Jewish-Austrian scholar born at Kojetín, Moravia (now in the Czech Republic). From 1861 to 1867, he attended the gymnasium at Kroměříž, Moravia, where he studied the Bible and Talmud with Jacob Brüll, rabbi of Kojetín, and with the latter's son Nehemiah.

== Life ==
Kaufmann was born to a father who managed a farm. He received a Jewish education as a young boy, then went to piarist school to complete his primary education. In 1867, he went to the Jewish Theological Seminary at Breslau, where he studied for ten years, while simultaneously taking courses at the University of Breslau. In the summer of 1874, he received his Ph.D. from the University of Leipzig; and on 29 January 1877, he was ordained rabbi. In the latter year, he declined the offer of a professorship at the Jewish Theological Seminary, preferring to accept instead the chairs of history, philosophy of religion, and homiletics at the newly founded Rabbinical Seminary of Budapest, which he continued to hold till his death. He also taught Greek and German in the preparatory school of the same institution, carrying on this work in the Hungarian language, which he had rapidly mastered.

As librarian of the seminary, he acquired the large library of Lelio della Torre of Padua, which made the seminary one of the most valuable Hebrew libraries of Europe. As a teacher, Kaufmann was highly successful; and his relation to his students was that of a friendly adviser. He maintained a lively correspondence not only with the most eminent Jewish scholars, but also with the leaders in other branches of science. Kaufmann was a corresponding member of the Royal Academy of Sciences of Madrid and a member of the executive committee of the Budapest branch of the Alliance Israélite Universelle. He died in Karlovy Vary, Bohemia, on 6 July 1899.

== Works ==
Title page of Geschichte der Attributenlehre... by David Kaufmann (1877/1967).

Kaufmann displayed a many-sided literary activity. The bibliography of his works, which M. Brann compiled for the Gedenkbuch zur Erinnerung an David Kaufmann (ed. M. Brann and F. Rosenthal, Breslau, 1900), includes 546 items, covering nearly every branch of Jewish science. His voluminous contributions to the periodical literature of the last two decades of the 19th century show him as a finished writer both of German and of Hebrew. His first and most important works, dealing with the philosophy of religion, include:

- Die Theologie des Bachja ibn Pakuda, Verfasser des חובות הלבבות, a prize essay written while a student at the seminary (in Berichte der Kaiserlichen Akademie der Wissenschaften, Vienna, 1874)
- Geschichte der Attributenlehre in der Jüdischen Religionsphilosophie des Mittelalters von Saadia bis Maimuni (Gotha, 1877–78), his chief work, being a survey of the Jewish and Arabic religious philosophy of the Middle Ages
- Die Spuren al-Batlajusi's in der Jüdischen Religionsphilosophie Nebst einer Ausgabe der Hebr. Uebersetzung Seiner Bildlichen Kreise (Budapest, 1880; also in Hungarian)
- Die Sinne. Beiträge zur Geschichte der Physiologie und Psychologie im Mittelalter. Aus Hebräischen und Arabischen Quellen (Budapest, 1884; also in Hungarian)
- an edition of the Minḥat Ḳena'ot of Jehiel ben Samuel Pisa (Berlin, 1898, forming a part of the Meḳiẓe Nirdamim collection)
- Studien über Salomon ibn Gabirol (Budapest, 1899; also in Hungarian)
- a large number of essays in various periodicals, noteworthy among which is the paper Der Führer Maimuni's in der Weltlitteratur (reprinted from Archiv für Geschichte der Philosophie, by L. Stein, xi., No. 3).

== Contributions to Jewish history ==
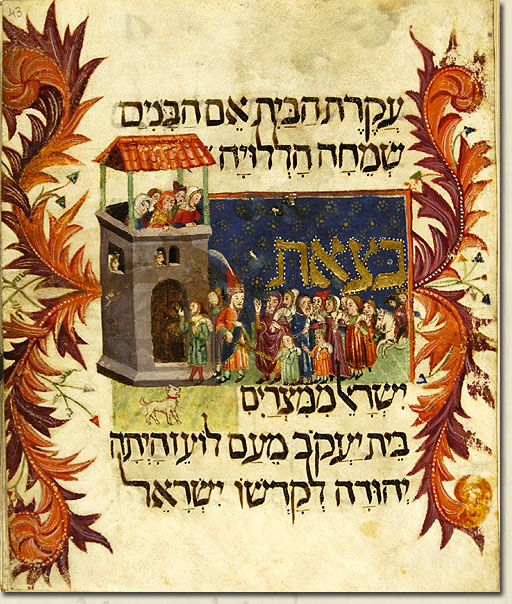
14th century hagaddah

His most important historical monographs are:

- Die Letzte Vertreibung der Juden aus Wien, Ihre Vorgeschichte (1625–70) und Ihre Opfer (Vienna, 1889; also in Hungarian)
- Zur Gesch. Jüdischer Familien: Samson Wertheimer, der Oberhoffactor und Landesrabbiner, 1658–1724, und Seine Kinder (Vienna, 1888)
- Urkundliches aus dem Leben Samson Wertheimers (Budapest, 1891; also in Hungarian)
- Die Familien Prags nach den Epitaphien des Alten Jüdischen Friedhofs in Prag, Zusammengestellt von Simon Hock, aus Dessen Nachlasse Herausgegeben, mit Anmerkungen Versehen und Biographisch Eingeleitet von Prof. Dr. D. Kaufmann (with Hebrew title-page, Presburg, 1892)
- Zur Gesch. Jüdischer Familien: I., R. Jair Chajjim Bacharach, 1638–1702, und Seine Ahnen (Treves, 1894)
- Dr. Israel Conegliano und Seine Verdienste um die Republik Venedig bis nach dem Frieden von Carlowitz (Budapest, 1895; also in Hungarian)
- Die Erstürmung Ofens und Ihre Vorgeschichte nach dem Berichte Isaak Schulhofs [Megillat Ofen], 1650–1732; Herausgegeben und Biographisch Eingeleitet (Treves, 1895)
- Aus Heinrich Heine's Ahnensaal (Breslau, 1896)
- Die Memoiren der Glückel von Hameln (Frankfort-on-the-Main, 1896, with Hebrew title-page);
- Die Chronik des Achimaaz aus Oria (reprint from "Monatsschrift," 1896).

== On Jewish art ==
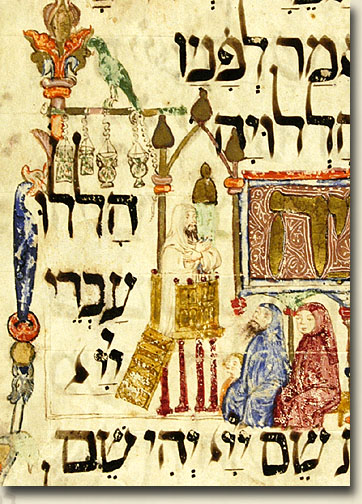
Mamluk lamps in Kaufmann Haggadah

Kaufmann was the first to take up the history of art in the synagogue, challenging the prevalent view that Judaism had always been aniconic. He marshalled a large and comprehensive corpus of data in order to prove it untenable. He was the first to use the term “Jewish art” in an article published in 1878, and is regarded as the founder of the scholarly discipline of Jewish art history. His disciple Dr. Samuel Krauss said in 1901:

As late as ten years ago it would have been absurd to speak about a Jewish art. It is Kaufmann's own merit to have uncovered this art. Not only did he have to prove that such an art existed, he also had to prove that it could exist, as he showed that the idea that the prohibition of images would obstruct the development of such an art was mistaken, and even established it as an irrefutable fact that the art in wide areas was not prohibited insofar as no worship was associated with it.

The following works of his in this field may be mentioned:

- Zur Gesch. der Kunst in den Synagogen (Vienna, 1897)
- Zur Gesch. der Jüdischen Handschriften-Illustration (contribution. to the édition de luxe of the Sarajevo Haggadah by D. H. Müller and I. v. Schlossar, Vienna, 1898)
- Sens et Origines des Symboles Tumulaires de l'Ancien Testament dans l'Art Chrétien Primitif (R. E. J. xiv. 33, 217).

Kaufmann also polemicized much on behalf of Judaism. Noteworthy among his writings along this line are:

- Ein Wort im Vertrauen an Herrn Hofprediger Stöcker yon Einem, Dessen Name Nichts zur Sache Thut (Berlin, 1880)
- Paul de Lagarde's Jüdische Gelehrsamkeit (Leipzig, 1887), a defense of his friend and master Zunz
- Wie Heben Wir den Religiösen Sinn Unserer Mädchen und Frauen (Treves, 1893)
- introduction to S. Heller's Die Echten Hebräischen Melodien (ib. 1893)

He was also an active member of the Meḳiẓe Nirdamim, a society for the publication of old Hebrew manuscripts. Kaufmann was the possessor of a large library, which contained many valuable manuscripts (including the Kaufmann Manuscript of the Mishnah), incunabula, and first editions, and of which the Marco Mortara library, acquired by Kaufmann, formed the nucleus.

== Jewish encyclopedia bibliography ==
An entire Kaufmann literature has arisen, of which the following works may be mentioned:

- F. Rosenthal, biography in the Kaufmann Gedenkbuch;
- Samuel Krauss, David Kaufmann, Berlin, 1902;
- H. Bloch, in Abendblatt of the Pester Lloyd, July 10, 1899;
- D. H. Müller, in Jahrb. des Vereines für Jüd. Gesch. und Literatur, Berlin, 1900;
- L. Blau, in Jahresbericht der Landesrabbinerschule, 1900.
