= Koy (animal) =

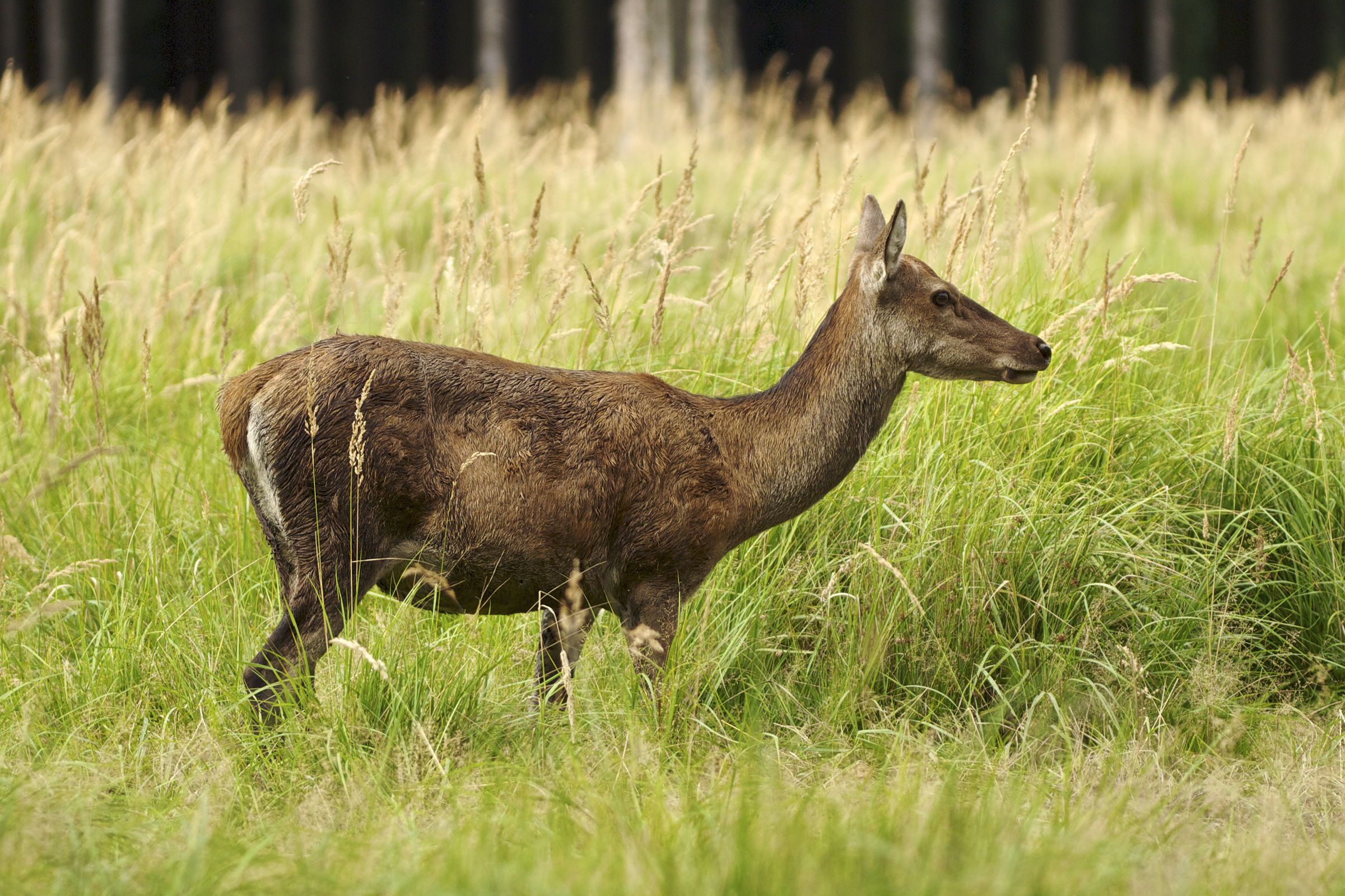

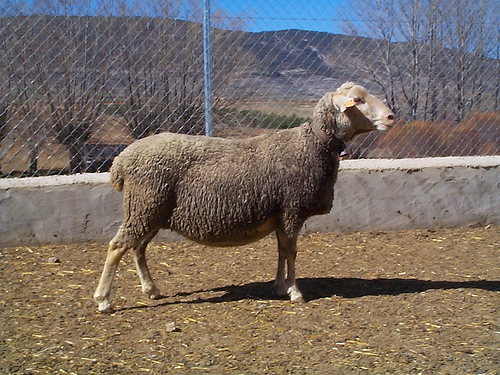
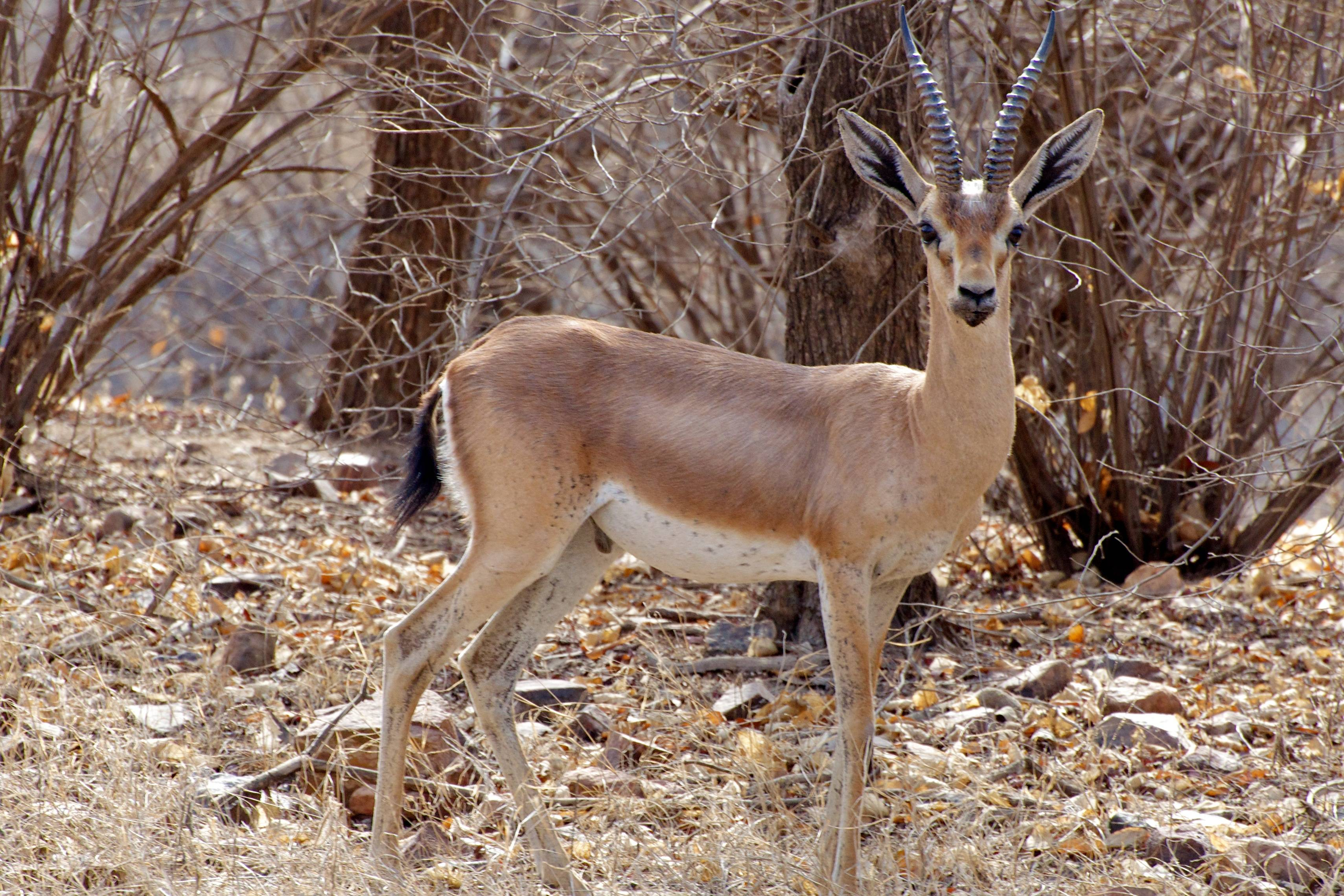
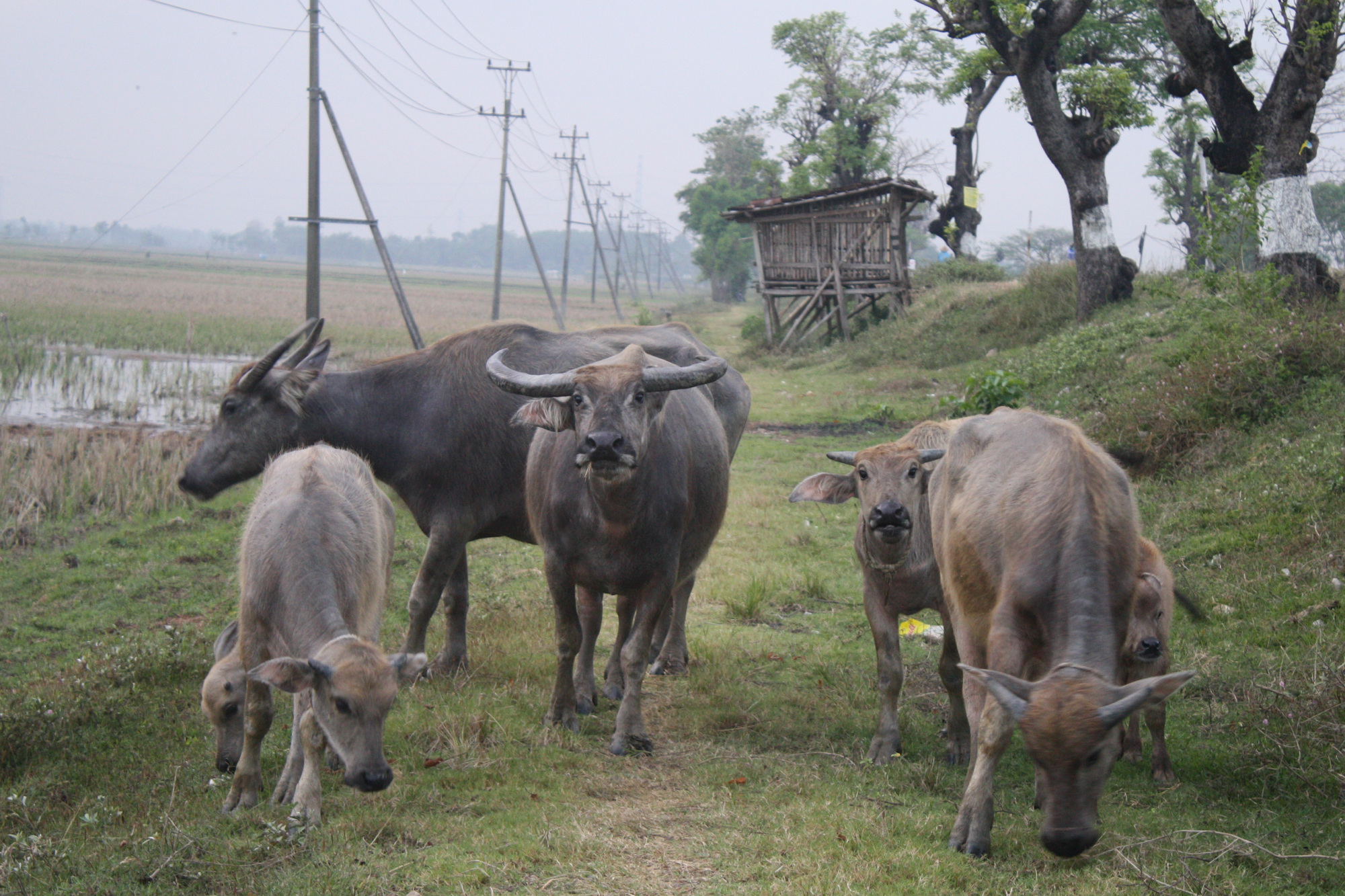

Different opinions regarding the identity of the koy:
Deer, hybrid of sheep and gazelle and Bubalus

The koy (Mishnaic Hebrew: כוי) is a kosher animal classified in the Mishnah as an intermediate between cattle and beast.

== Spelling and pronunciation ==
Ashkenazi Jews traditionally pronounced the word as kvi (Hebrew: כְּוִי); while Yemenite Jews and most Sephardi Jews pronounced it as koy (Hebrew: כּוֹי). Nowadays, many Ashkenazi Jews also pronounce it as koy which is the correct spelling according to most scholars.

Different spellings are found in various manuscripts such as the Kaufmann Manuscript and others.

== Etymology ==
One opinion is that the word is from the same root as cow, and refers to the cow of the Germanic peoples which was halfway domesticated. Another possibility is that the word is from the same root as the Arabic قوي (kawy), meaning strong.

== Identity ==
The Talmud cites three opinions regarding the identity of the koy:

1. It is a type of wild deer (Hebrew: איל הבר) (identified by some as the mouflon).
2. The Talmud brings down that some say it is a hybrid of a male goat (Hebrew: תיש) and a female gazelle (Hebrew: צביה). Since the father is considered a type of cattle and the mother a type of beast, the question remains whether the offspring (the koy) has the halakhic status of cattle or beast. This might be the opinion of Rav Chisda.
3. It is a separate species for itself.

Some modern scholars identify the koy as the Bubalus.

== Halakhic ramifications ==
The sages were not sure whether the koy has the halakhic status of cattle or beast, and therefore they ruled stringently, sometimes giving it the status of cattle and sometimes giving it the status of beast. The details of these laws are recorded in the Mishnah.
