= Yechezkel Kutscher =

Israeli philologist and Hebrew linguist

Edward Yechezkel Kutscher
- יחזקאל קוטשר
- Born: 1 June 1909; Topoľčany, Austria-Hungary
- Died: 12 December 1971 (aged 62)
- Occupations: Philologist, linguist
- Awards: Israel Prize (1961)

Academic work
- Discipline: Hebrew linguistics
- Institutions: Hebrew University of Jerusalem; Bar-Ilan University
- Notable works: Research on Mishnaic Hebrew and Aramaic

Edward Yechezkel Kutscher or Yechezkel Kutscher (Note: also: Ezekiel Kutscher) (Hebrew: יחזקאל קוטשר; 1 June 1909 – 12 December 1971) was an Israeli philologist and Hebrew linguist.

== Biography ==
Kutscher was born in 1909 in Topoľčany, Slovakia, then part of the Austro-Hungarian Empire. He studied at the yeshiva in his home town and, later, in Frankfurt. In 1931 he emigrated to Mandatory Palestine and continued with his studies at the Mercaz HaRav Yeshiva and at a Mizrachi Movement teachers seminary. For several years subsequently, he taught at various schools in Tel Aviv and Jerusalem.

In 1941, he completed his studies in Hebrew linguistics at the Hebrew University of Jerusalem and, in 1949, began lecturing in linguistics at the Hebrew University, which he continued to do until his death. In 1960 he was appointed a professor. In 1958 he also started lecturing at Bar-Ilan University.

For many years Kutscher was a member of the Academy of the Hebrew Language and its predecessor, the Hebrew Language Committee (Vaʻad ha-lashon ha-ʻIvrit). In 1965 he was appointed editor of the periodical Leshonenu ("Our Language").

Kutscher was regarded as "probably the greatest living authority on Aramaic until his death in 1971." His research work included the study of different Mishnaic Hebrew scripts, including the Kaufmann Manuscript and Dead Sea Scrolls. His work revealed the Kaufmann Manuscript to be most authentic of the Mishnah.

== Awards ==
- In 1961, Kutscher was awarded the Israel Prize, for the humanities.

== See also ==
- List of Israel Prize recipients
