= Seligmann Heller =

Austrian poet and journalist

Seligmann Heller (8 July 1831 – 8 January 1890) was an Austrian poet and journalist.

Heller was born at Raudnitz, Bohemia. After completing his course at the University of Vienna, where he studied philology and law, he engaged in business with his father. In 1866 he became teacher of German at a commercial school at Prague, and was at the same time member of the editorial staff of "Bohemia." He taught also at the Talmud Torah at Prague. In 1873 he went to Vienna, where he became dramatic critic for the "Deutsche Zeitung," and, subsequently, teacher of the history of literature at the Handelsakademie.

Heller published "Ahasverus," an epic poem on the Wandering Jew, Leipzig, 1866 (2d ed., ib. 1868); "Die Letzten Hasmonäer," Prague, 1865; and "Gedichte," Vienna, 1872. He died in Vienna

After Heller's death his translations of medieval Hebrew poems were edited by his friend David Kaufmann and published under the title "Die Echten Hebräischen Melodien," Treves, 1892 (2d ed., Breslau, 1903).
