= Kaufmann Manuscript =

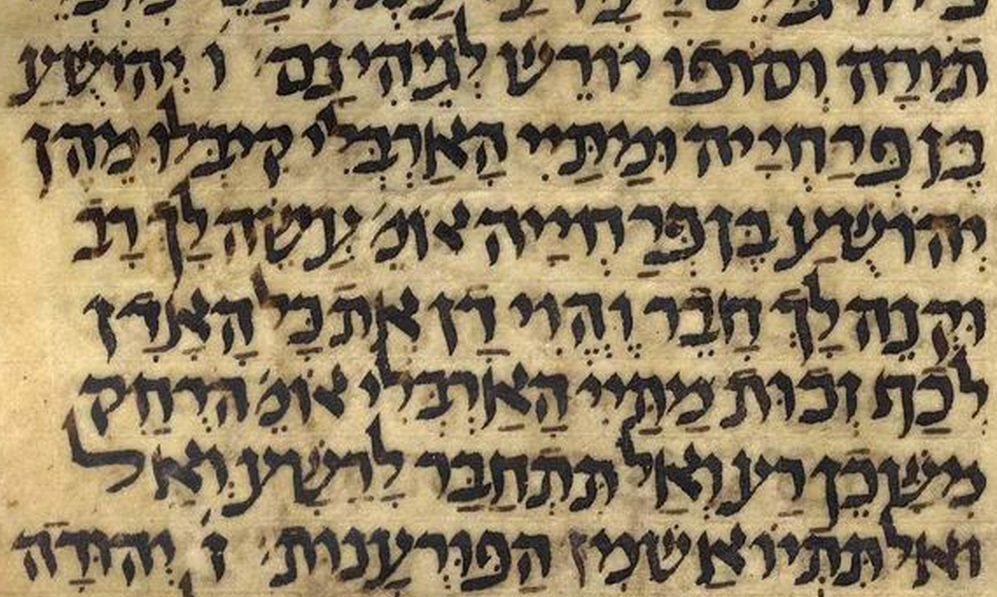
Tractate Avot, Chapter 1. You can read the first two lines the names of Nittai of Arbela (written here Mattai) and of Joshua ben Perachiah.

The Kaufmann manuscript is a complete Hebrew manuscript of the Mishnah. It is part of the collection of David Kaufmann located at the Library of the Hungarian Academy of Sciences in Budapest (MS A50).

== The Manuscript ==
This is a complete manuscript of all six orders of the Mishnah. It was written in the 10th or 11th century, probably in the land of Israel or perhaps in Italy (the experts disagree). The text includes the diacritics (nekudot). However, the letters and the nekudot were not done by the same author. The manuscript was vocalized a few centuries after the text was written, and the vocalization was introduced from a copy of the Mishnah having a different text than the Kaufmann manuscript. In some places, the words of the manuscript are indeed written in full, while the nekudot were added as if the word was written in defective writing. However, it is assumed that one person was responsible for all of the nekudot of the manuscript. The author of this vocalization seems to belong to the Sephardic tradition, which sometimes reverses the pataḥ with qamats, and tsere with segol. Although in general the difference exists, one can find צַריך, אַמַה, עומֶד, עושֵה.

As demonstrated by Yechezkel Kutscher, the Kaufmann manuscript is the most complete early manuscript of the Mishnah that has survived. It retains the original forms of the language as it was spoken by Chazal in the 2nd century, not mixing in biblical forms. This language belongs to the western dialect of the language of the Sages; that is to say, the dialect used in the Land of Israel, as opposed to the Babylonian dialect.

== Bibliography ==
- Safrai, Shmuel, ed. (1987), "The Literature of the Sages", First Part: Oral Torah, Halacha, Mishna, Tosefta, Talmud, External Tractates, Assen, Maastricht and Philadelphia: Van Gorcum and Fortress Press, ISBN 978-0800606053
