= Holy Spirit in Christian art =

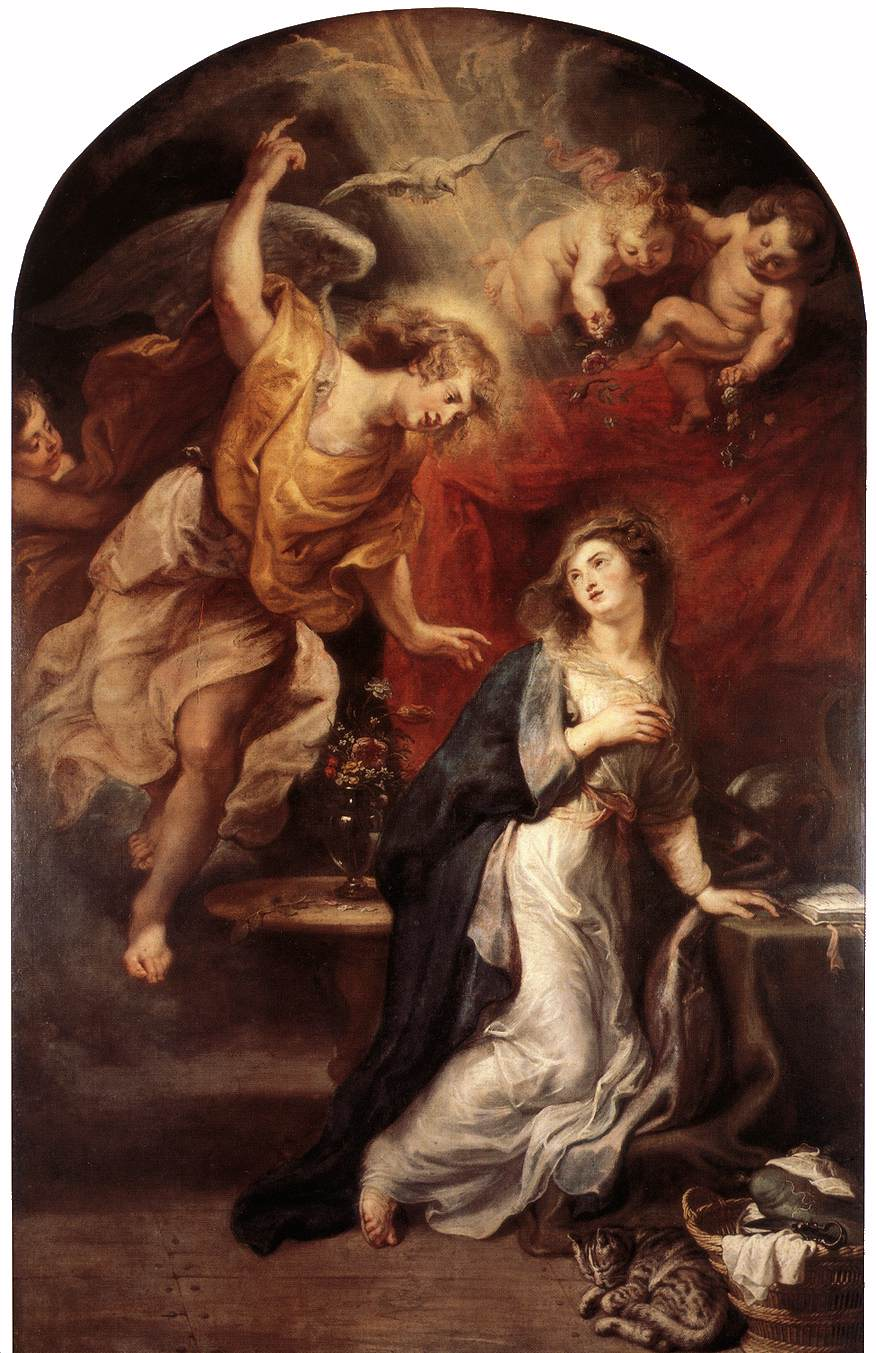
The Holy Spirit as a dove in the Annunciation by Rubens, 1628

The Holy Spirit has been represented in Christian art both in the Eastern and Western Churches using a variety of depictions.

The depictions have ranged from nearly identical figures that represent the three persons of the Holy Trinity from a dove to a flame.

The Holy Spirit is often depicted as a dove, based on the account of the Holy Spirit descending like a dove on Jesus at his baptism. In many paintings of the Annunciation, the Holy Spirit is shown in the form of a dove, coming down towards Mary on beams of light, as the Archangel Gabriel announces Christ's coming to Mary.

A dove may also be seen at the ear of Saint Gregory the Great─as recorded by his secretary or other church father authors, dictating their works to them.

The dove also parallels the one that brought the olive branch to Noah after the deluge, as a symbol of peace.

The book of Acts describes the Holy Spirit descending on the apostles at Pentecost in the form of a wind and tongues of fire resting over the apostles' heads. Based on that account, the Holy Spirit is sometimes symbolized by a flame.

There are also depictions of the Holy Spirit in the book of Genesis. In The Vatican Museum in Rome is a carved stone sarcophagus depicting the Holy Trinity as three bearded men during the creation of Eve. The majority of early Christian art depicts The Holy Spirit in an anthropomorphic form as a human with two other Identical human figures representing God the Father and Jesus Christ. They either sit or they stand grouped together. This is used to portray the unity of the Most Holy Trinity.

The Holy Spirit is represented in various artistic mediums such as stained glass windows and calligraphy.

== Gallery ==
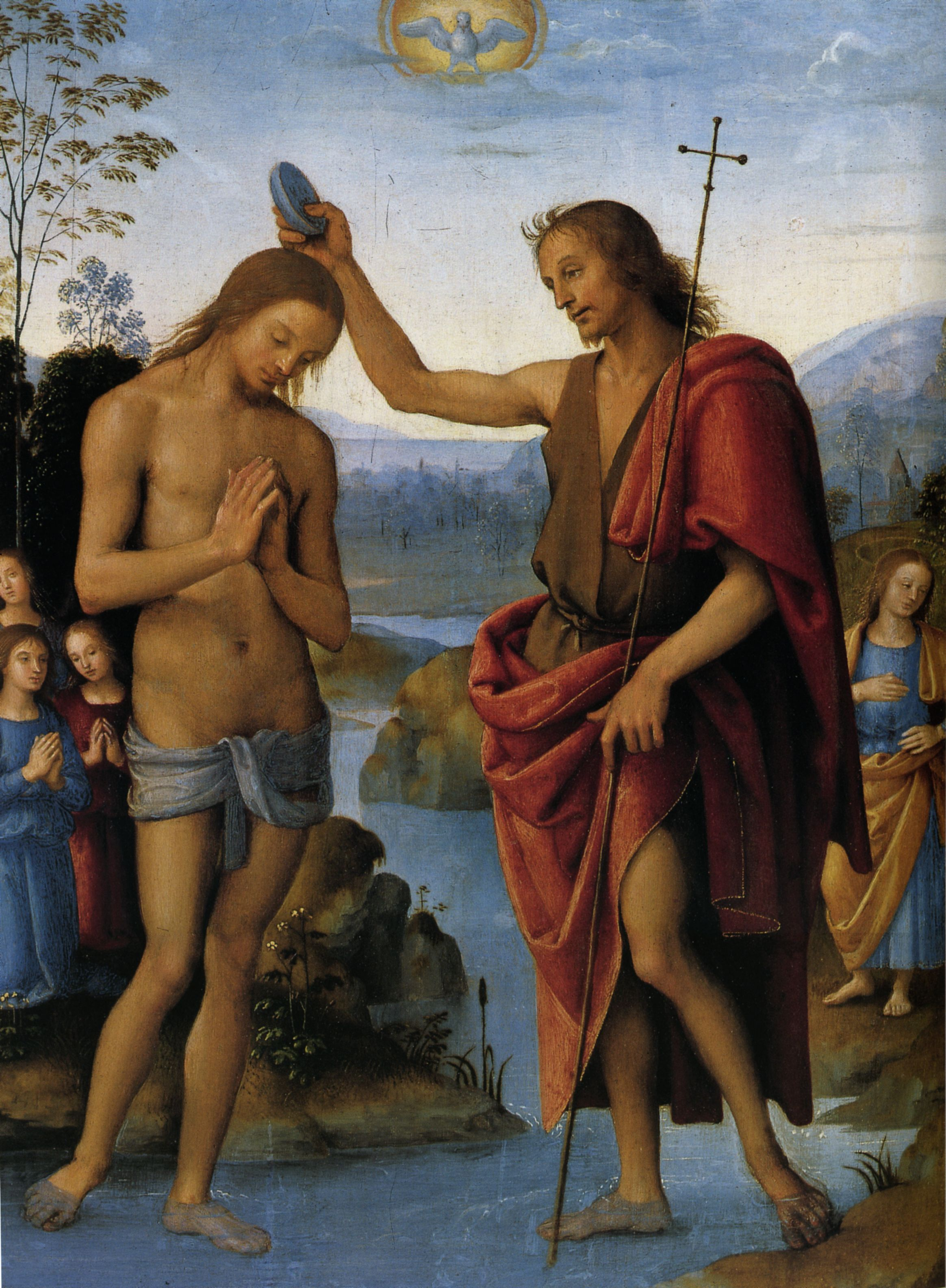
Baptism of Christ by Pietro Perugino, circa 1498

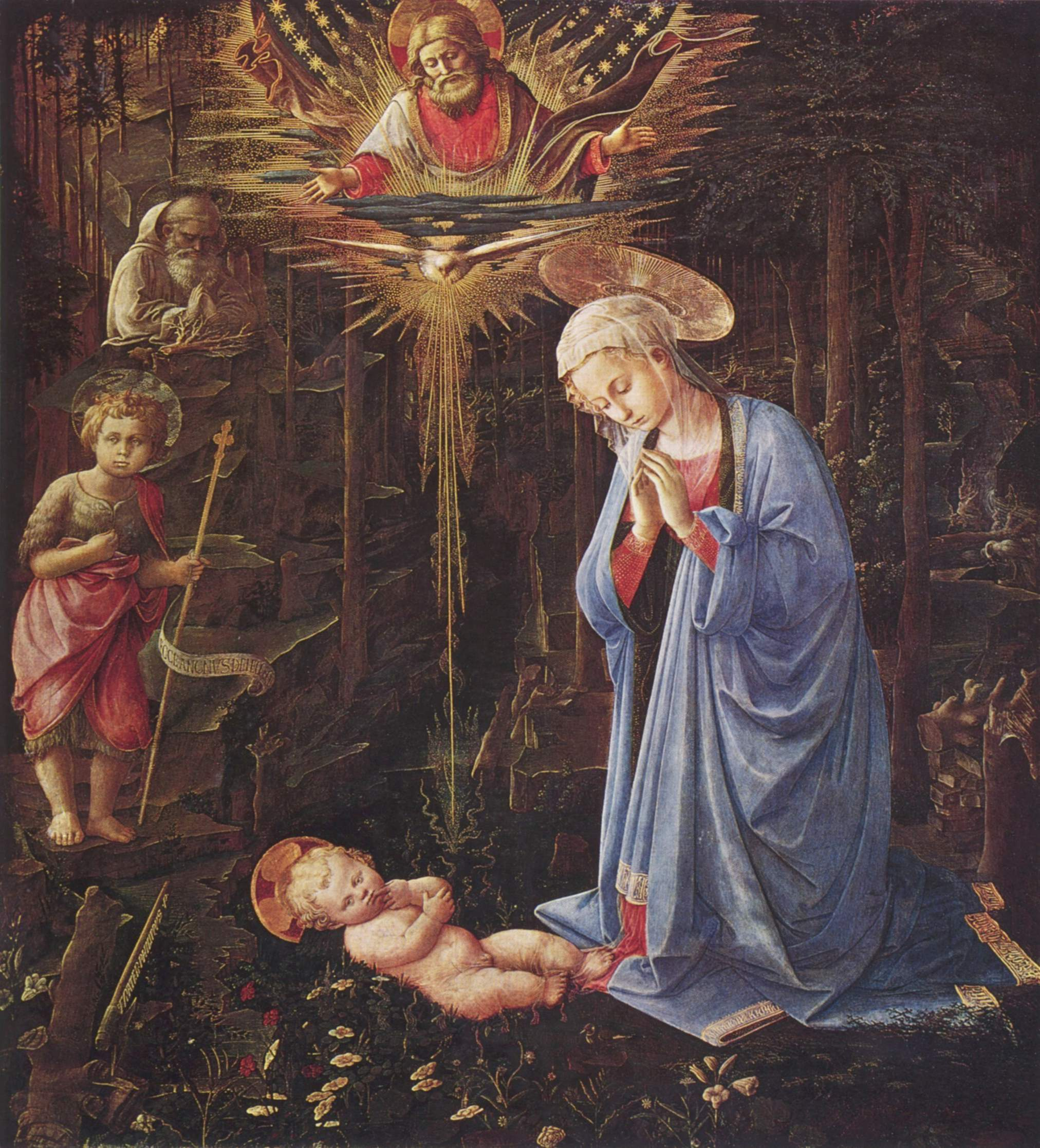
Scene by Filippo Lippi, 1459

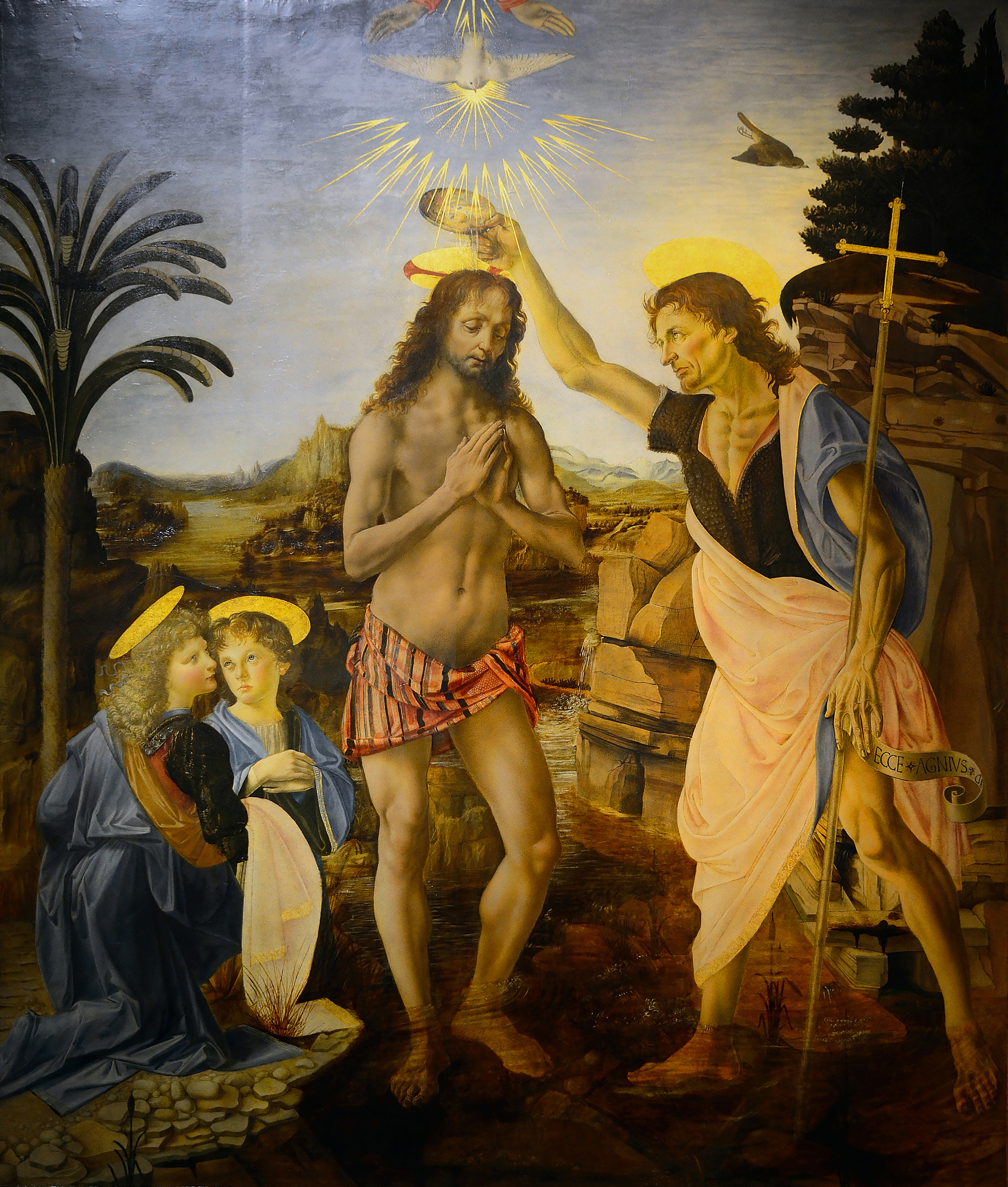
Both hands of God (relatively unusual) and the Holy Spirit as a dove in Baptism of Christ, by Verrocchio, 1472.

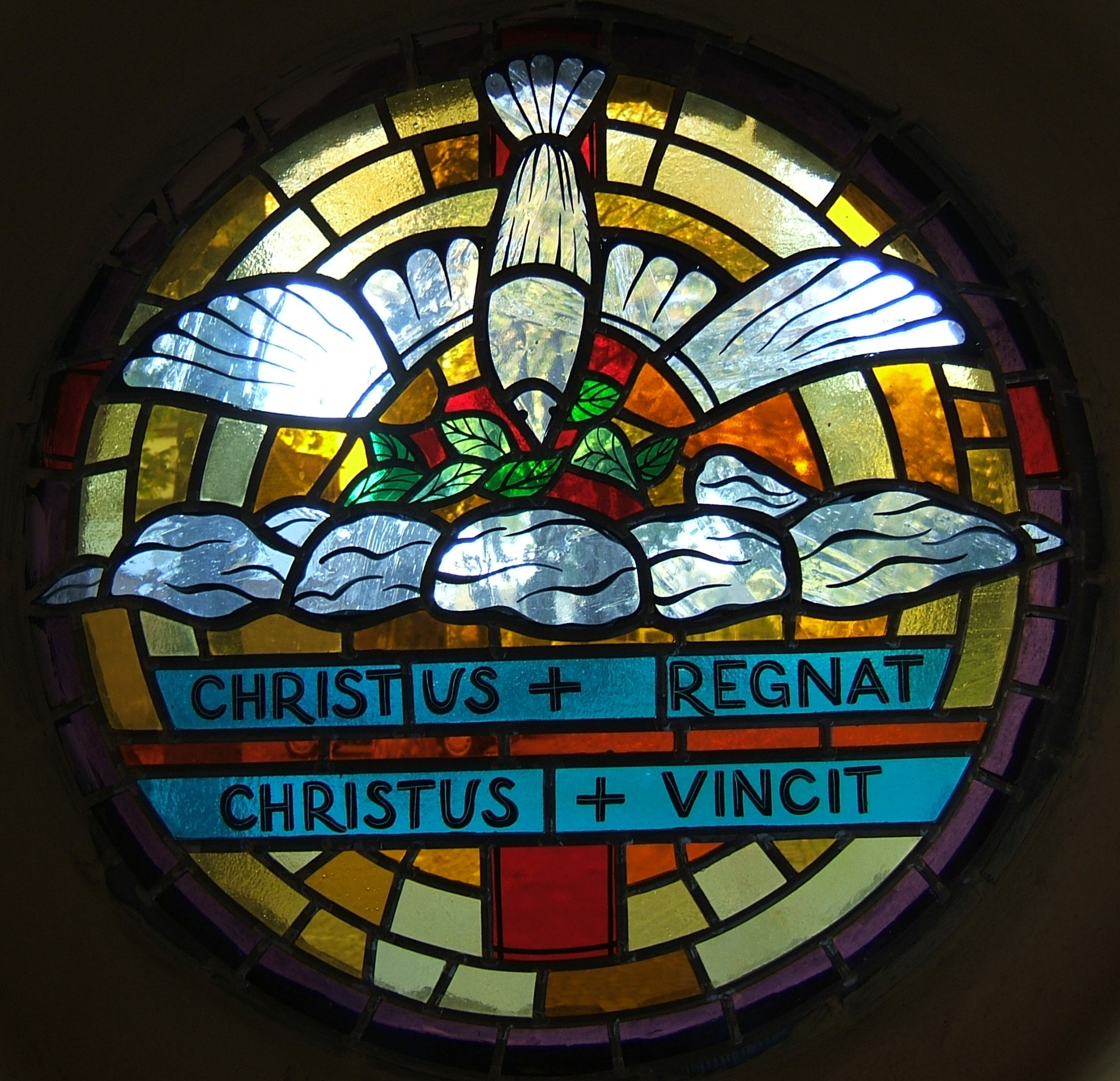
Stained glass window, Zabrze, Poland

=== In the Trinity ===
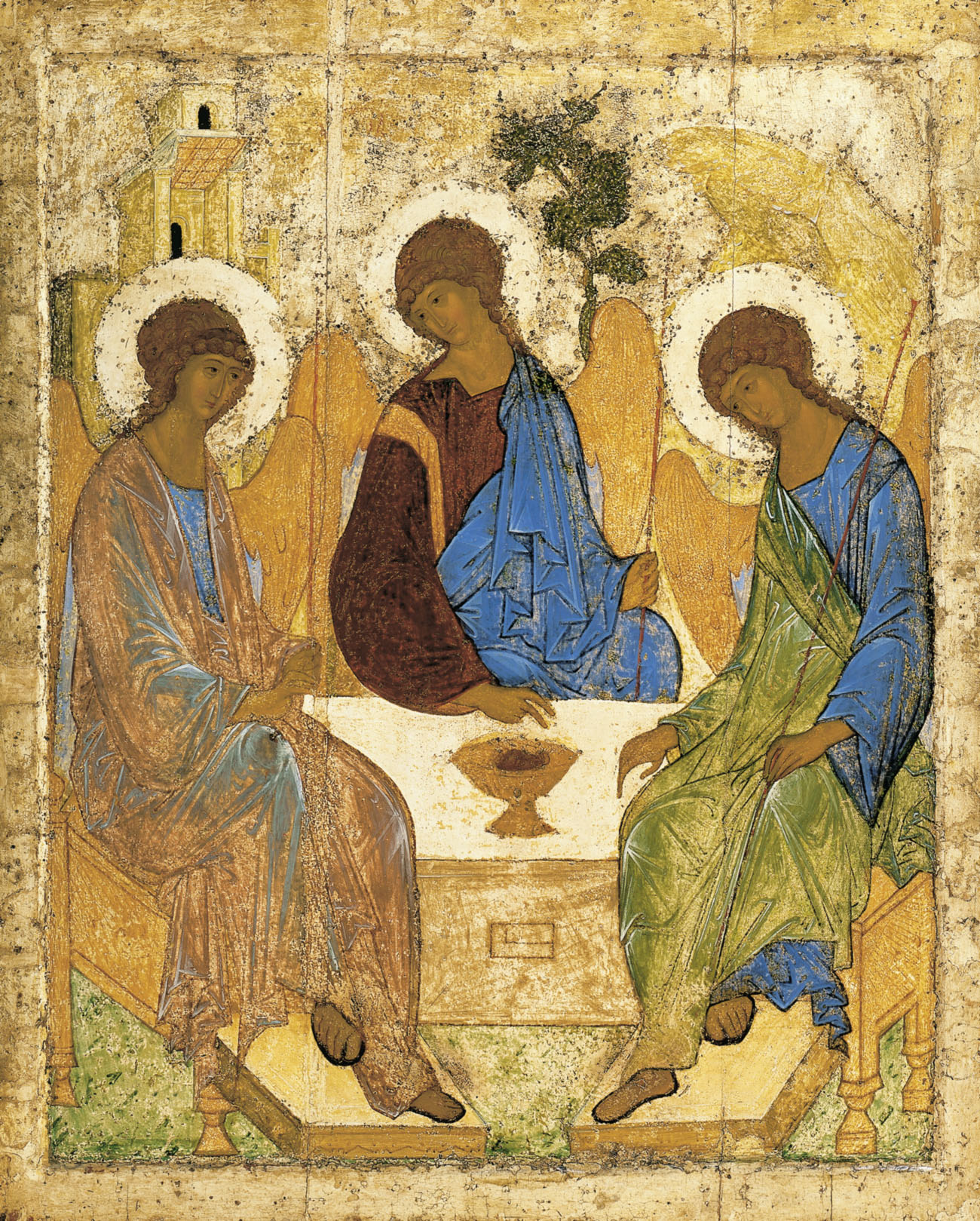
Andrei Rublev's Trinity, representing the Father, Son and Holy Spirit in a similar manner.

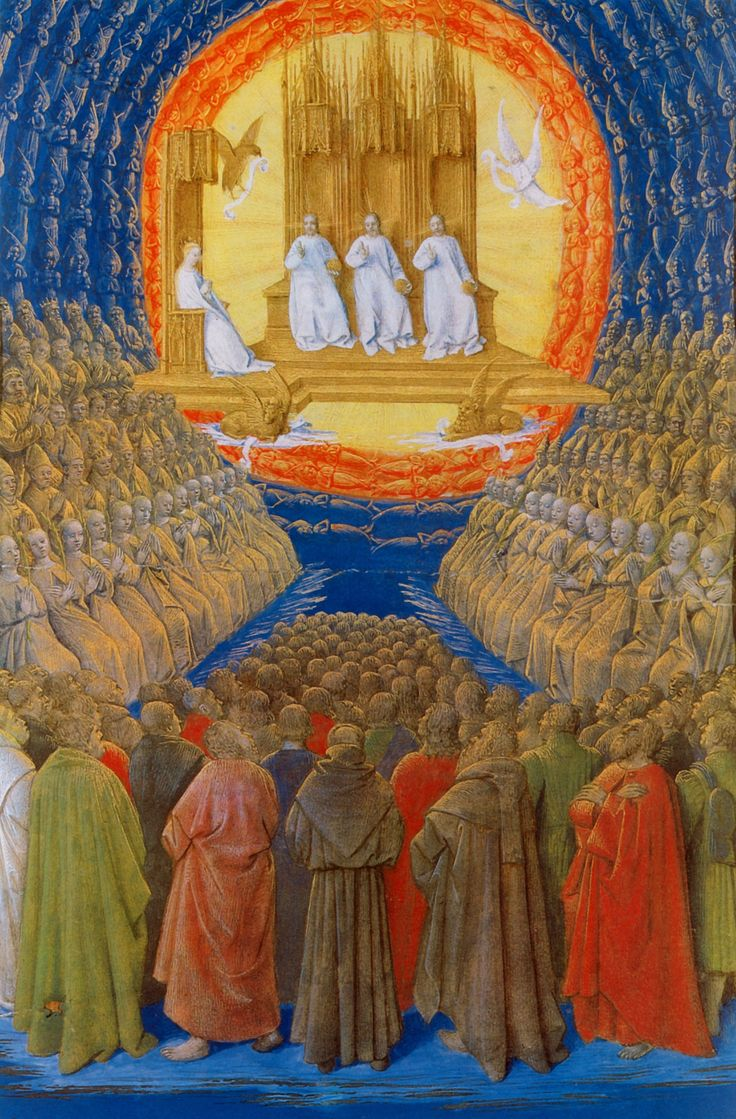
Trinity and all the saints, Jean Fouquet, 15th century

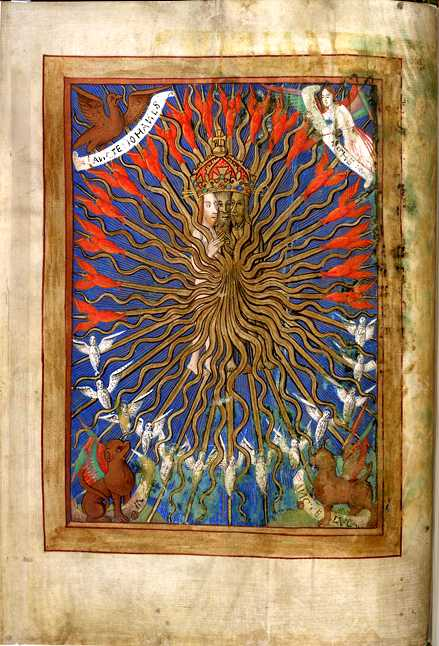
Multiple head representation, 16th century

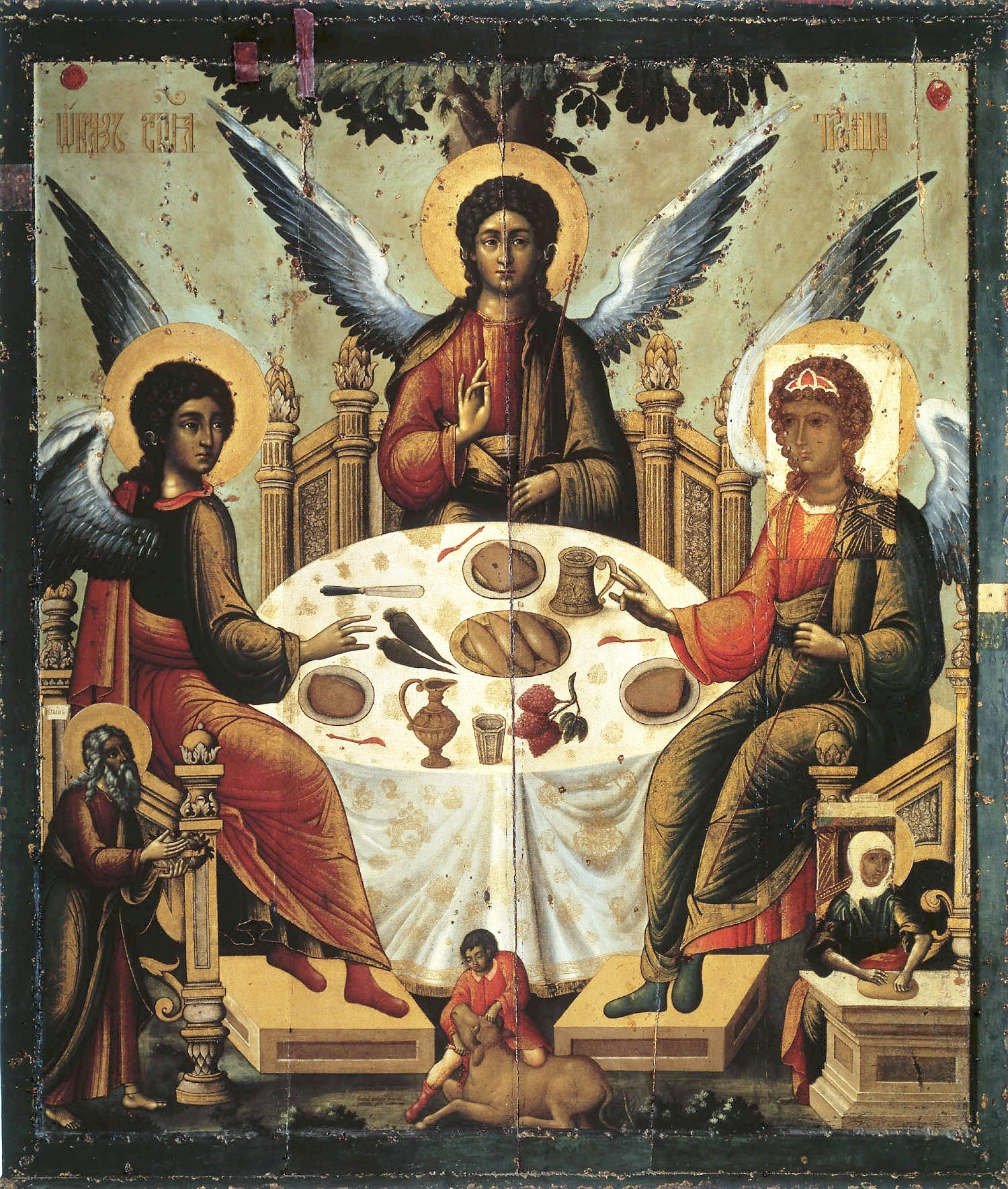
Russian icon of Holy Trinity

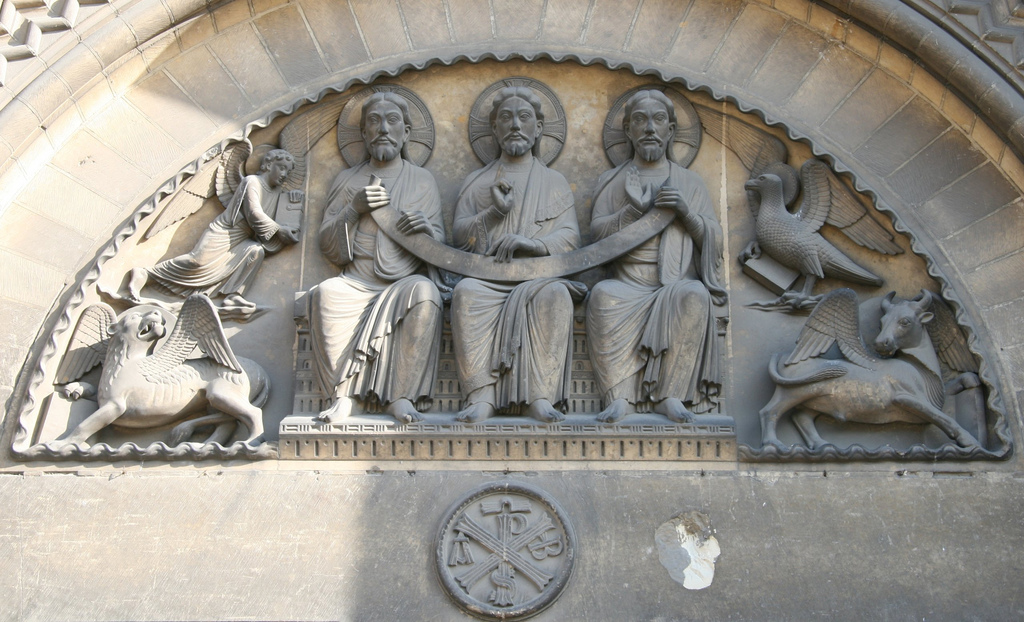
Abbaye aux-dames Sainte-Trinité Caen, 1862

=== Pentecost ===
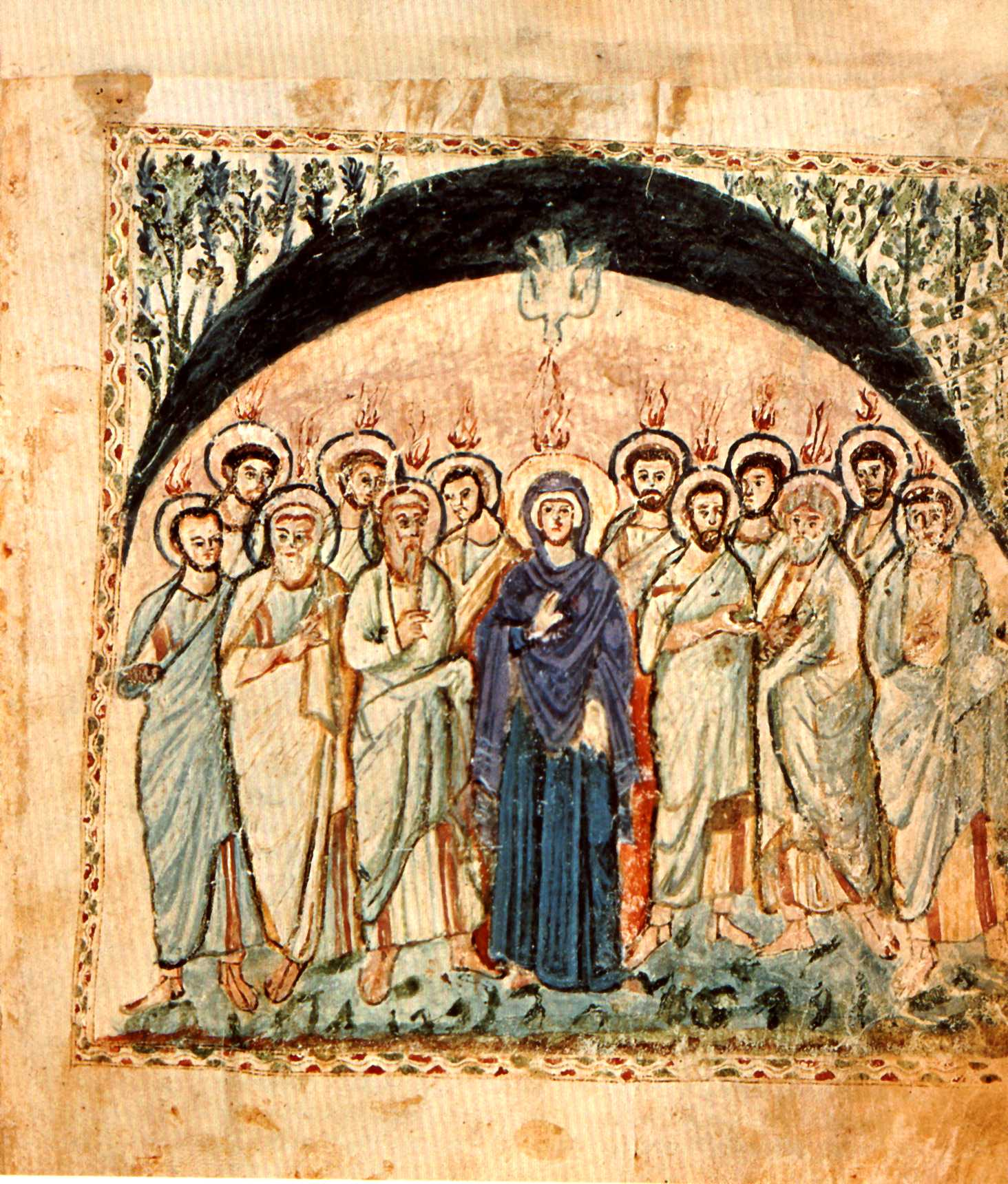
Early depiction from the Rabbula Gospels, 6th century

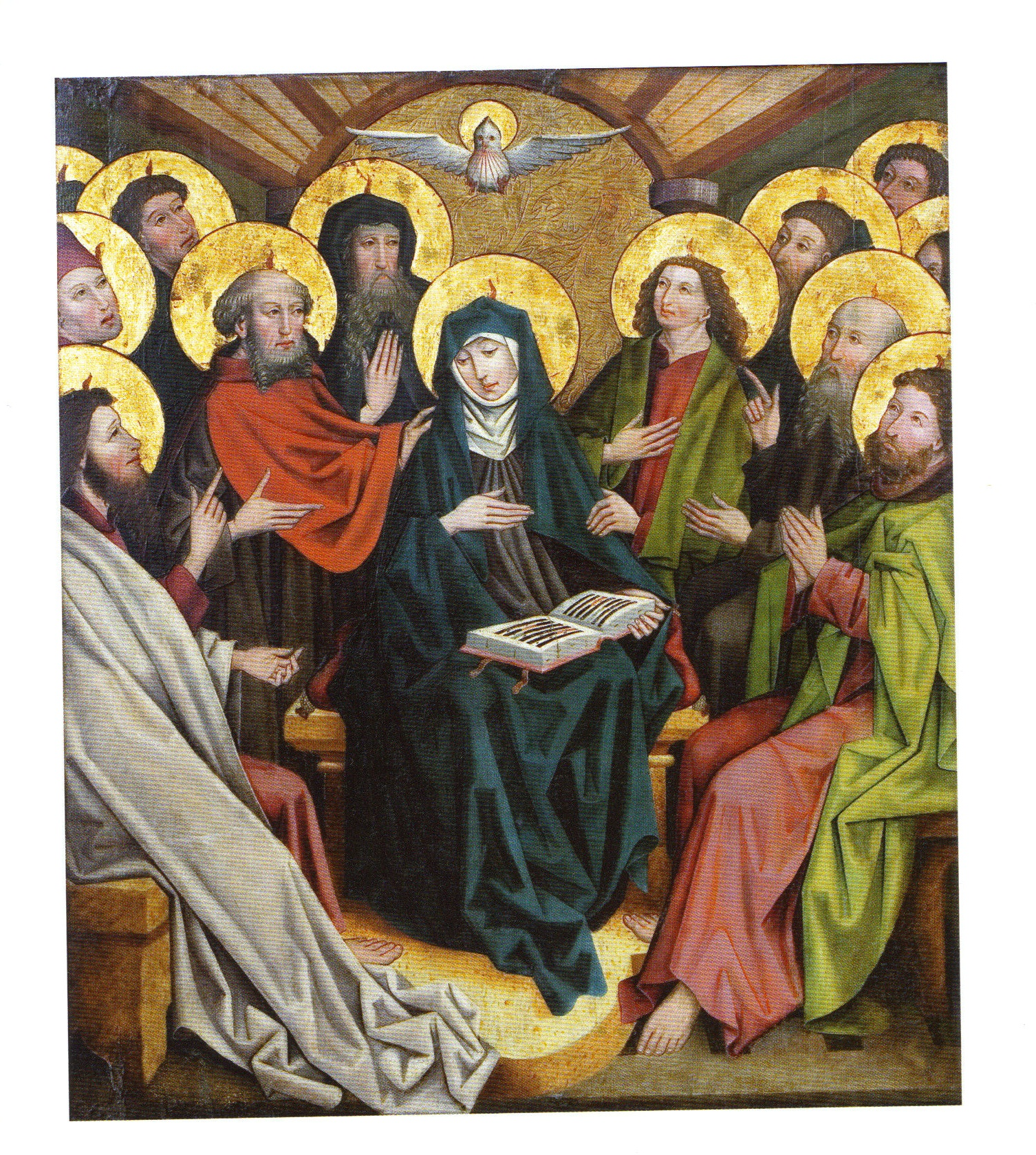
Wolfegg Castle, 15th century

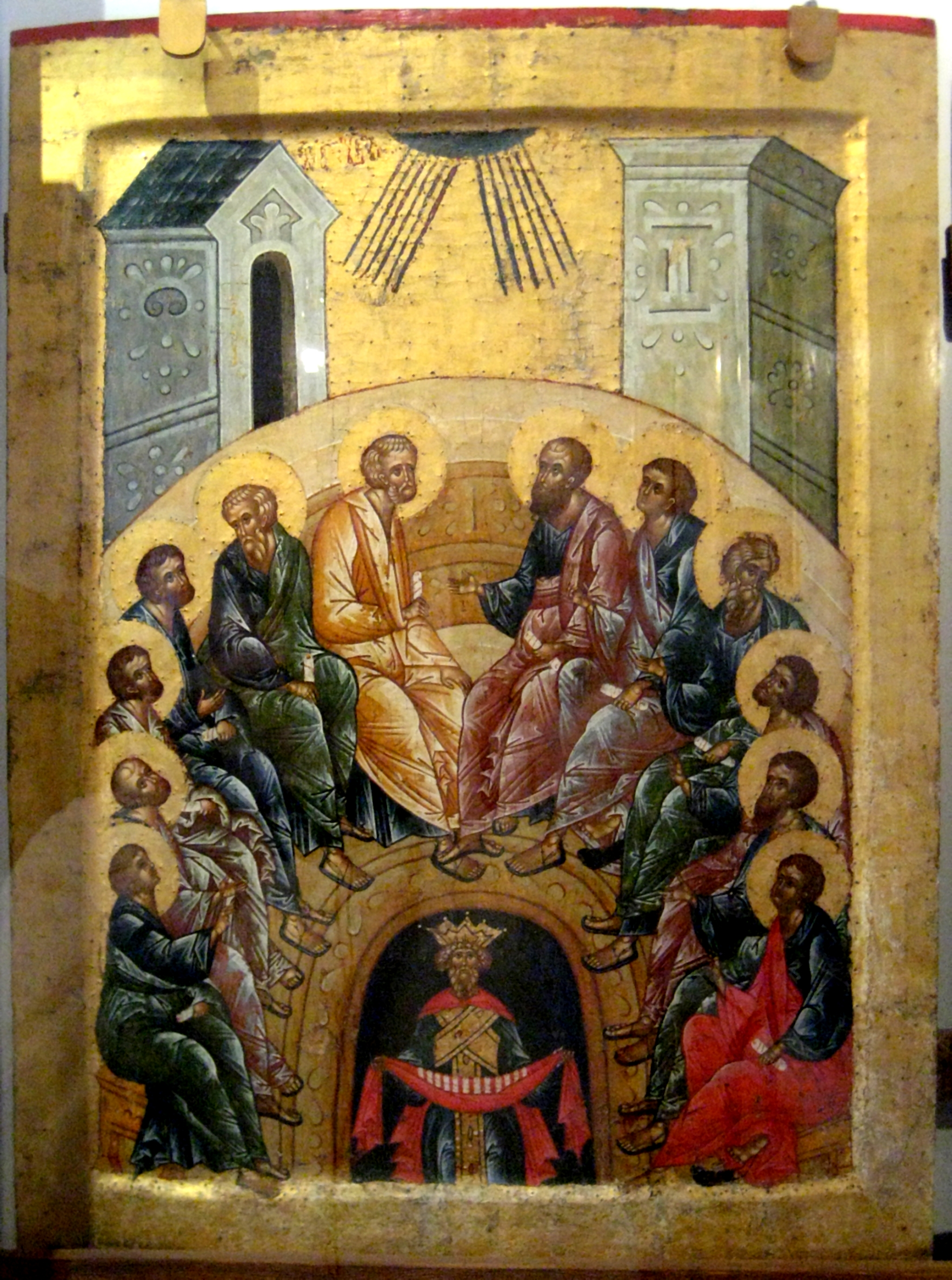
Russian icon, 15th century

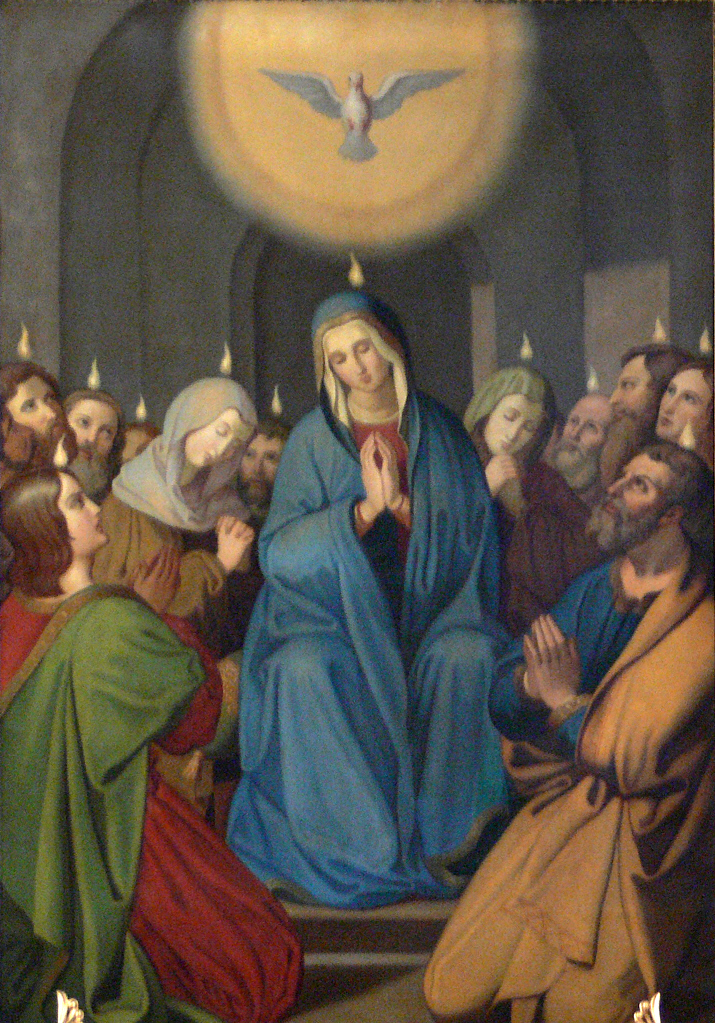
Ravensburg, Germany, 1867

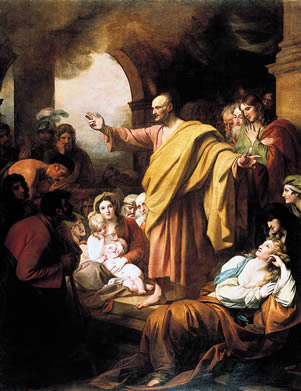
Benjamin West, 19th century

== See also ==
- God the Father in Western art
- Trinity in Christian art
