= Samuel Krauss =

Jewish scholar (1866–1948)

- Krauss in 1912
- Born: 18 February 1866; Ukk, Kingdom of Hungary
- Died: 4 June 1948 (aged 82); Cambridge, England
- Occupations: Scholar of ancient Judaism; professor
- Known for: Talmudische Archäologie; contributions to the Jewish Encyclopedia

Samuel Krauss (Ukk, 18 February 1866 - Cambridge, 4 June 1948) was professor at the Jewish Teachers' Seminary, Budapest, 1894–1906, and at the Jewish Theological Seminary, Vienna, 1906–1938. He moved to England as a refugee and spent his last years at Cambridge.

He was a contributor to the Jewish Encyclopedia as S. Kr.

"Professor Krauss's scholarship encompassed every area of ancient Judaism." In 1910, he became a pioneer in Talmudic archaeology with the publication of Talmudische Archäologie, which was reprinted in Hebrew in 1924. In 1998, his 1922 study of the ancient synagogue, Synagogale Altertümer, was still considered essential reading on the topic.

In 1935 he published a comprehensive and detailed study of Biblical names of ninety eight then modern nations.
