= Marmara Archipelago =

Island group in the sea of Marmara, Turkey

The Marmara Archipelago (Turkish; Marmara Takimadaları) is a group of islands located in the South of the Sea of Marmara, belonging to the Balıkesir Province of Turkey. The Marmara Islands consist of four inhabited and 17 uninhabited islands. The archipelago has one small central town called Marmara (population 2000) and 13 villages. The inhabited islands are Marmara, Avsa, Pasalimani and Ekinlik.

The two islands are divided between the different districts of the Balıkesir Province. Avsa and Ekinlik belong to Marmara District, which is the biggest island in the area, and Pasalimani belongs to Erdek District, which is located in Kapidagi Peninsula.

Marmara is a mountainous and island with a mostly green landscape. The island has beaches, hotels and pensions although it is not a popular tourist spot. Avşa is a smaller island with less vegetation, less mountainous landscape, more beaches, more nightlife alternatives and is bustling during the summer season. Pasalimanı and Ekinlik Islands have few tourists, less vegetation and minimal facilities for travelers.

== Inhabited islands ==
- Marmara Island - 117.8 square km (Population: 6.800). Villages; Marmara (center), Gündoğdu, Çınarlı, Asmalı, Topağaç, Saraylar
- Avşa Island - 20.6 square km (Population: 2527). Villages; Avşa (center), Yiğitler
- Paşalimanı Island - 21.4 square km (Population: approx 1500). Villages; Paşalimanı, Harmanlı, Tuzla, Balıklı, Poyrazlı
- Ekinlik Island - 2.5 square km (Population: 102)

== Archipelago ==
- Marmara Archipelago Marmara Adaları, Arap Adaları, Marmaron, Marmaros, Proconnesus, Prokonnesos
  - Avşa Island Türkeli, Afusia, Afissia, Afyssia, Afisia, Afousia, Afisya, Ophioussa, Ophiousa, Ofiousa, Ofiusa, Aosia, Araplar, Arablar, Panagia, Avşar
    - Ekin Kayası Island; Fener, Round Rock
    - Martı Island
  - Ekinlik Island Kutali, Koútali, Akanthos, Ekenlik, Arktónēssos, Κούταλη, Άρκτόνησος
  - Erdek Islands
    - Tavşan Island; Erdek, Artake
    - Zeytinli Island
  - İmralı Island Aigaion, Besbicus, Besbikos, Kalolimnos, Kalolimni, Galios, Galyos, Emir Ali
  - Kapıdağ Islands
    - Akçaada Island; Akça, Fatih
    - Martı Kayası Island
  - Koyun Island Phoibe, Phivi, Kuyus
    - Hacı Islands
      - Hasır Island
      - Soğan Island
    - Mamalı Island; Mamalya, Mamalia
  - Marmara Island Proikonesos, Prokonnesos, Proikonnesos, Prokonnisos, Prikonnisos, Proconnesus, Marmaron, Marmaros, Marmora, Elafonisos, Elaphonnesos, Elafonessos, Neuris
    - Anataş Island; Adataş, Adalaş, Batizona
    - Eşek Islands
      - Eşek Island; Işık, Nisi
      - Kayainönü Island
    - Fener Island; Fenerada, Fanar, Asmalı, Asmalıada, Delphakie, Delphakia, Polydora, Polydori
    - Hayırsız Island; Skopelos
  - Paşalimanı Island Halónē, Alóni, Haloni, Aulonia, Alonya, Alonisos, Nea Prokennos, Porphyrione, Porfyrioni, Άλώνη, Αλώνη
    - Hızır Reis Island; Hızırreis
    - Kötürüm Island
    - Kuş Island; Bala, Pala
    - Palamut Island
    - Yer Island; Nísos Panagía

== Access ==
The distance from Istanbul to Marmara Island is 76 nautical miles (141 km; 87 mi). Transport facilities vary depending on the season. During the summer season many tourists visit the islands. Avşa and Marmara have daily connections from Istanbul from May to October. Connections are available everyday from Tekirdağ and Erdek. Paşalimanı has daily transport from Erdek District only. Ekinlik Island has connections through Erdek District and Avşa Island.
