= Belkıs Tombolo =

- Tombolo
- Location in Turkey
- Coordinates: 40°22′N 27°53′E
- Location: Balıkesir Province, Turkey

Dimensions
  - Length: 1.5 km (0.93 mi)
  - Width: 1.7 km (1.1 mi)

Belkıs Tombolo is a tombolo in Marmara Sea of Turkey. It is in Balıkesir Province. At 40°22′N 27°53′E the tombolo connects Kapıdağ Peninsula to main land (Anatolia). The width of the tombolo is 1,700 metres (5,600 ft) and the length is 1,500 metres (4,900 ft). Bandırma Gulf is to the east and Erdek Gulf is to the west of the tombolo. The eastern shore is covered by sand dunes and the western shore is a sandy beach. The midpoint of the tombolo is a marshland. There are two highways across the tombolo from Bandırma in the mainland to the peninsula; One to the eastern coast and one to the western coast and Erdek.
