= Erdek Gulf =

Gulf of the Marmara Sea, Turkey

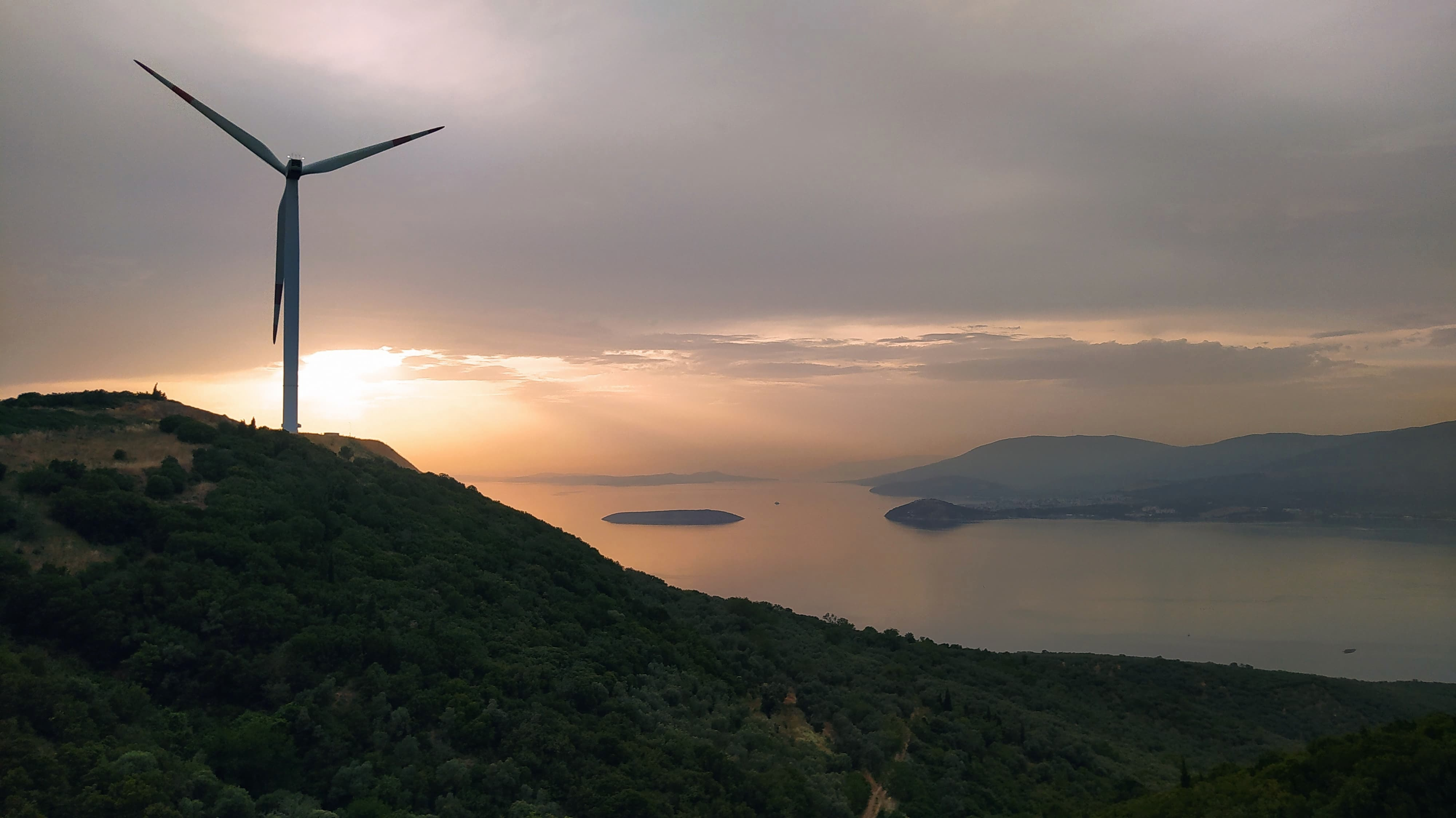
A view of Erdek Gulf.

Erdek Gulf is a gulf of Marmara Sea, Turkey. It is administratively a part of Balıkesir Province. In fact, the gulf is named after Erdek, an ilçe (district) of the Balıkesir Province which is situated at the north coast of the gulf . The midpoint of the gulf is at about 40°22′N 27°40′E. Kapıdağ Peninsula, Paşalimanı Island and Avşa Island are to the north, Belkıs Tombolo (connecting Kapıdağ Peninsula to the Anatolia mainland) is to the east, Karabiga ilçe is to the west and the Marmara coast of Anatolia is to the south. The maximum depth of the gulf is 47 metres (154 ft).

There are ferry services in the gulf. One service is to Barbaros in the Thracen side of Turkey, close to Tekirdağ. There are also ferry services to the nearby islands such as Marmara Island (Saraylar terminal), Avşa Island and the Paşalimanı Island.
