= 1935 Erdek–Marmara Islands earthquake =

Earthquake in Turkey

- Location within Marmara
- UTC time: 1935-01-04 14:41:30
- ISC event: 904020
- USGS-ANSS: ComCat
- Local date: 4 January 1935
- Local time: 16:41 EET
- Magnitude: 6.4 M_{w}
- Depth: 15 km (9.3 mi)
- Epicenter: 40.62°N 27.45°E
- Areas affected: Turkey
- Total damage: Several villages
- Max. intensity: MMI VIII (Severe)
- Casualties: 5 dead, 30 injured

The 1935 Erdek–Marmara Islands earthquake occurred at 16:41:30 local time 4 January on the islands of Marmara and Avşa off Erdek in the Sea of Marmara, Turkey. It had a moment magnitude of 6.4 and a maximum felt intensity of VIII (Severe) on the Mercalli intensity scale, causing 5 deaths and 30 injuries.

Three aftershocks occurred in conjunction with this destructive earthquake that was felt strongly in Istanbul, Edirne and İzmir. The villages Gündoğdu, Çınarlı, and Asmalı on Marmara Island were completely flattened, and the island's town center was damaged. On the neighboring Avşa Island, 128 houses in the Türkeli village and all the houses of Yiğitler village were destroyed. On Paşalimanı Island, the villages Poyraz and Harmanlı were completely destroyed and the villages Paşalimanı and Balıklı were partly damaged. The foghorn building on Hayırsız Island was demolished and rocks at the shore fell into the sea.

The submarine communications cable running across the Sea of Marmara remained intact. In the villages Narlı and Ocaklar on the Kapıdağ Peninsula, and as well as around Avşa, fountains dried and emitted noise. Since the earthquake occurred in the daytime, fatalities were few. Five people were killed and 30 were injured. Aftershocks continued until March 7, 1935.

== See also ==
- List of earthquakes in 1935
- List of earthquakes in Turkey
