= Marmara region =

Marmara Marmara Bölgesi
- Region
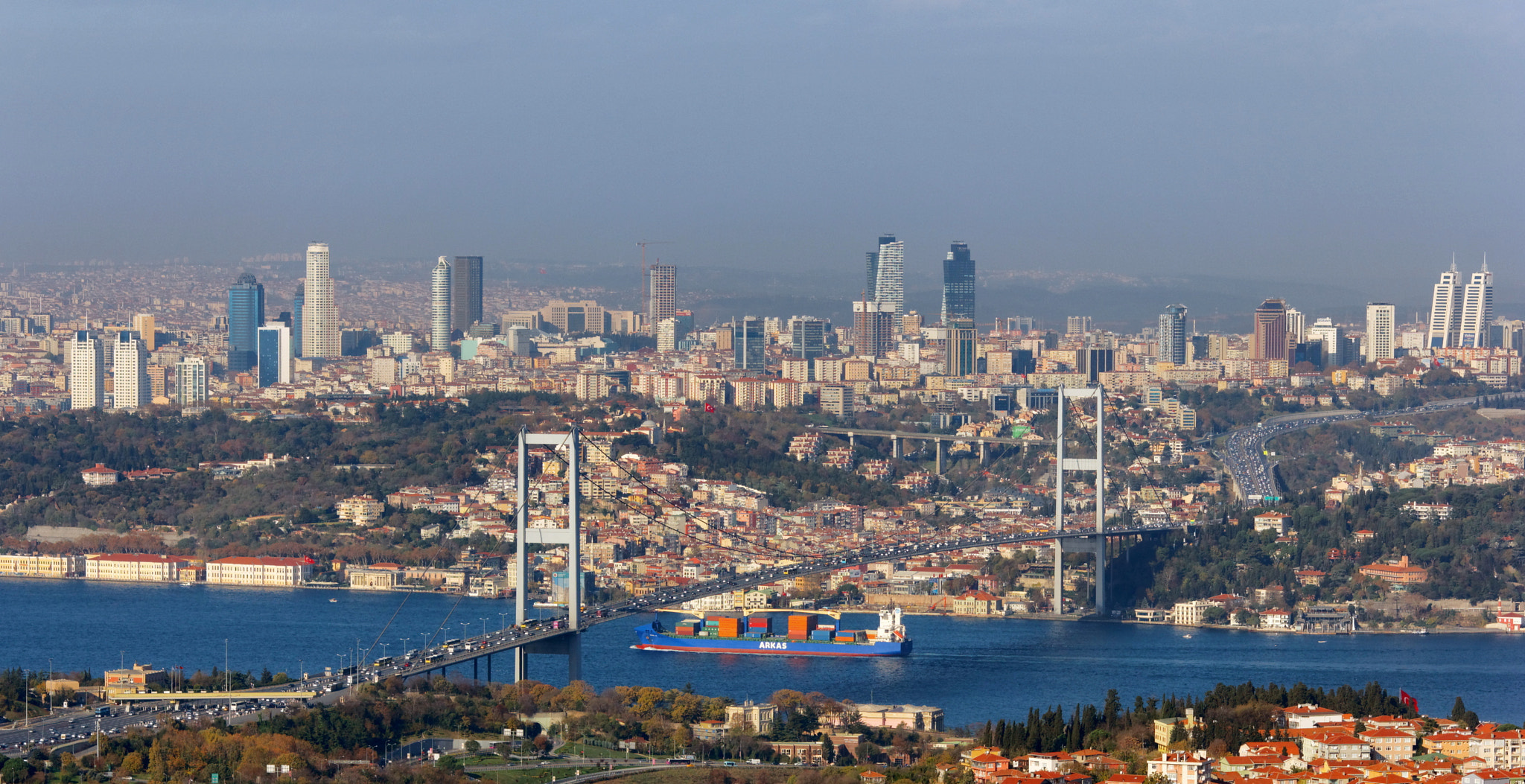
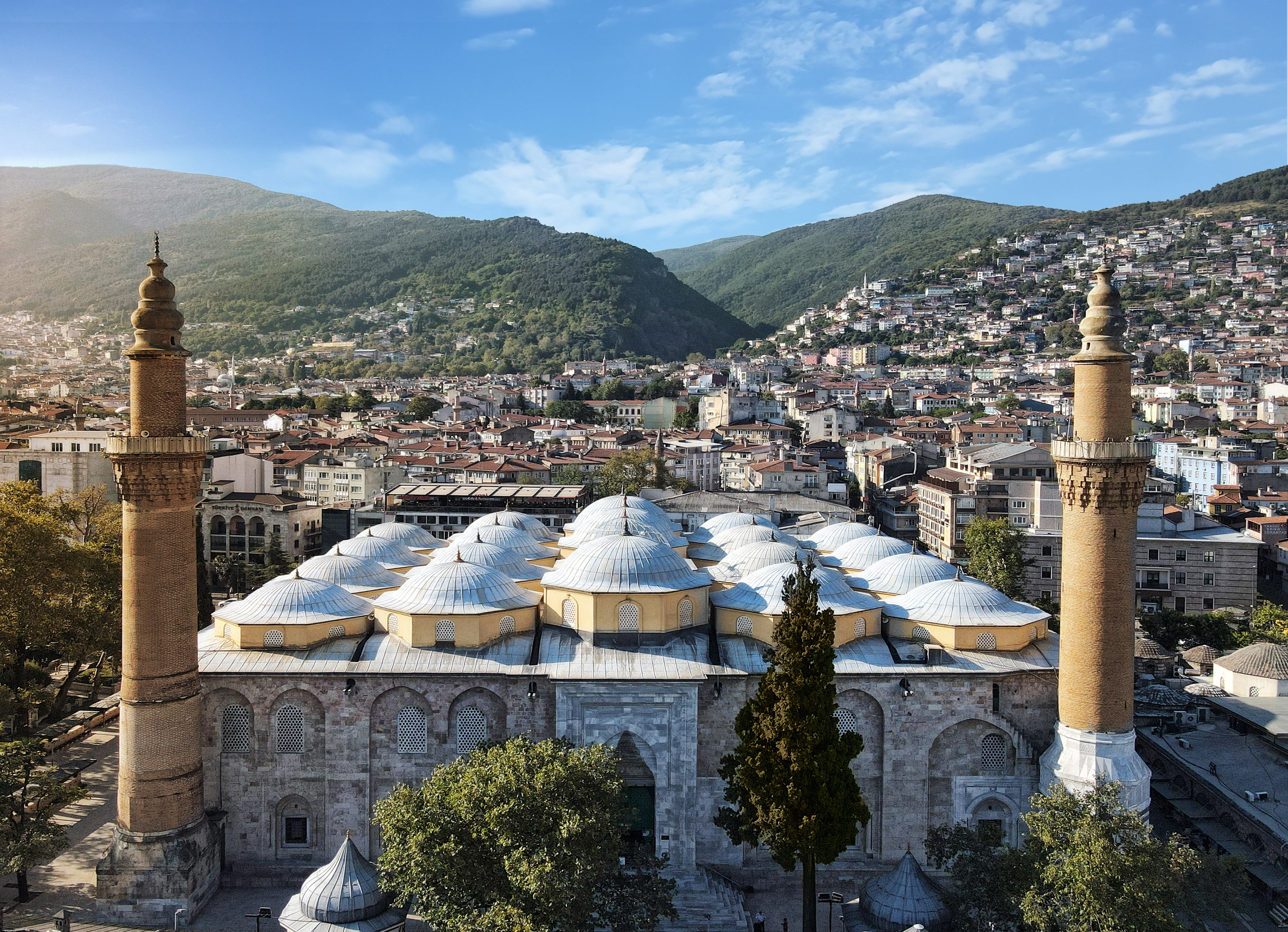
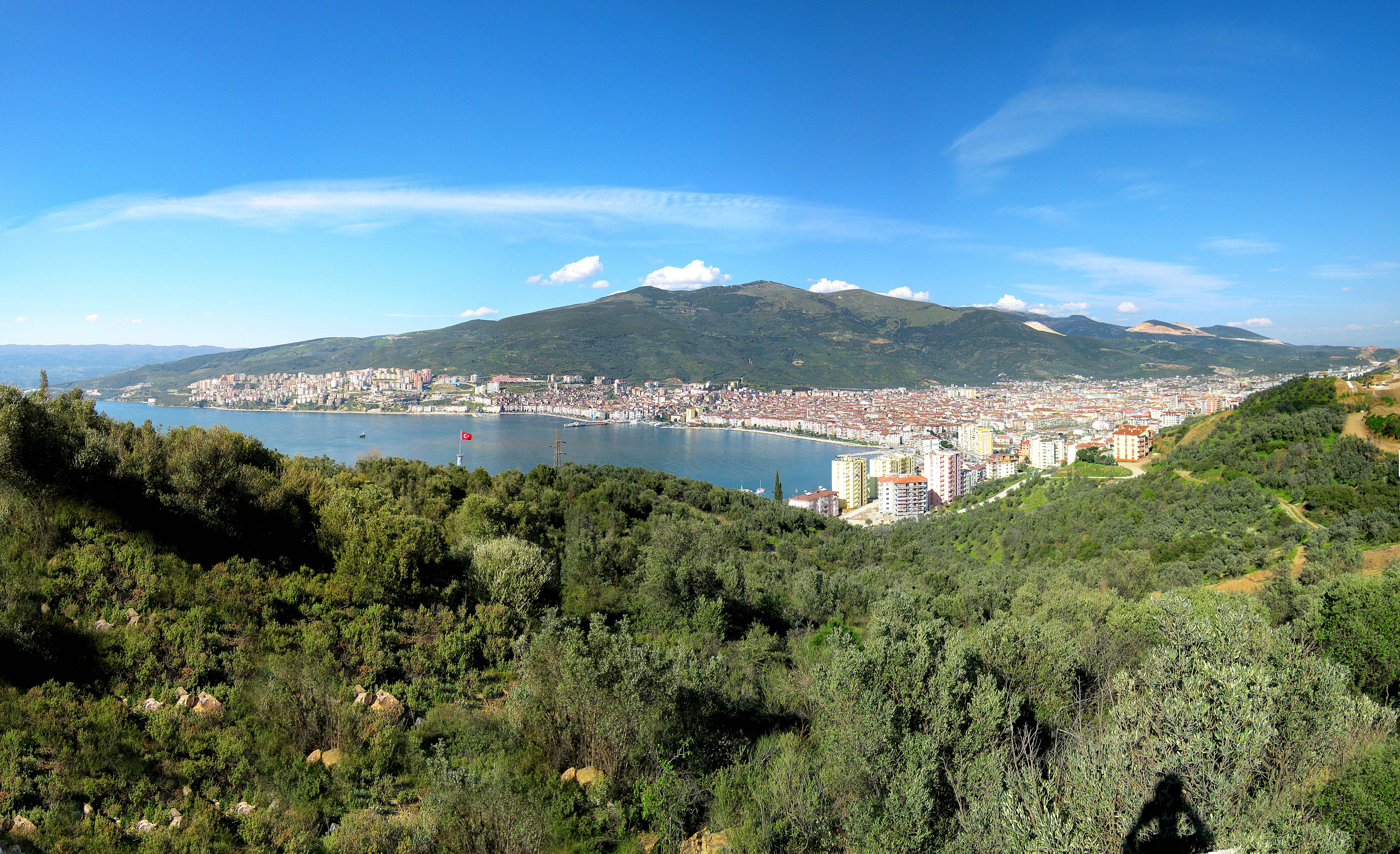
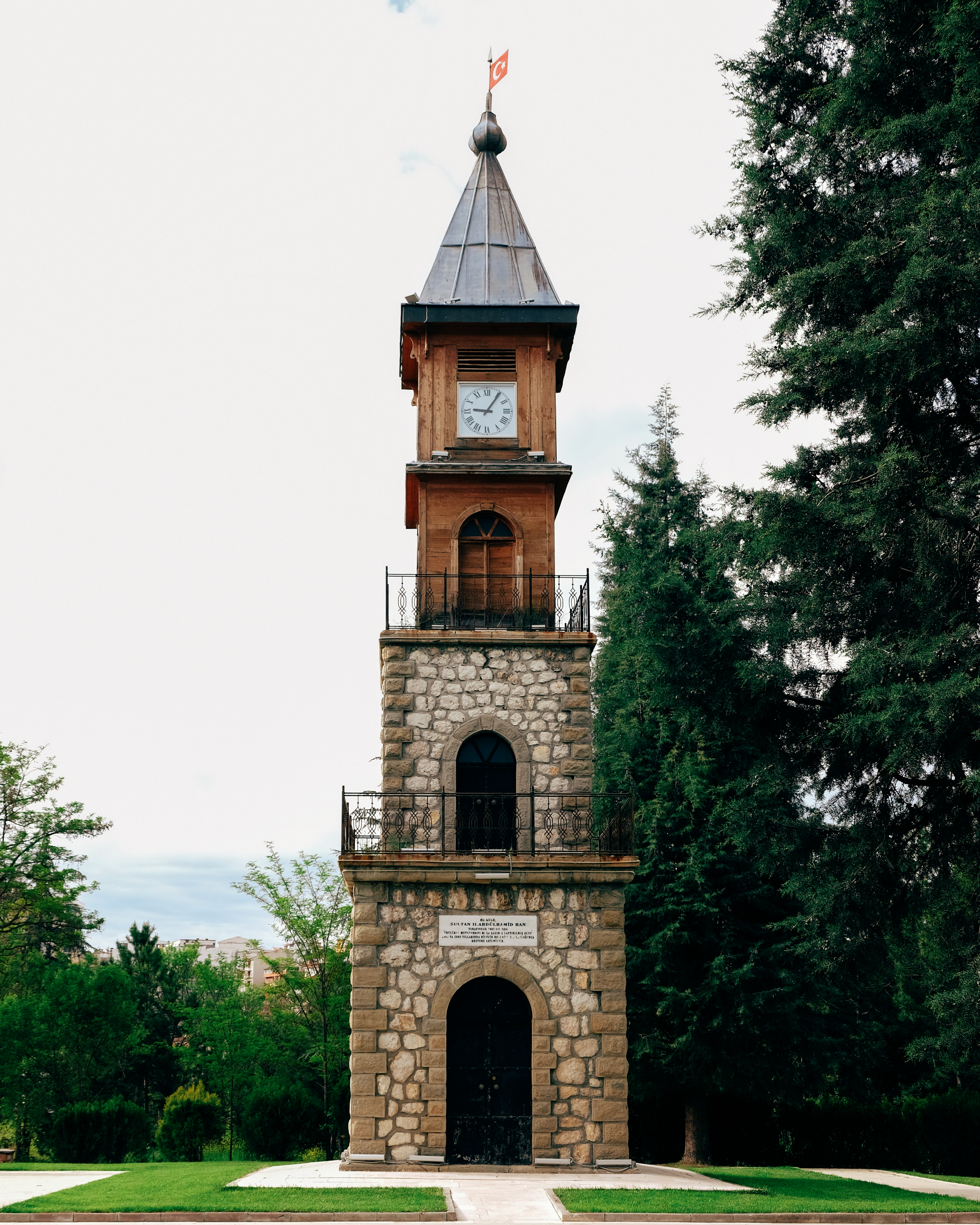
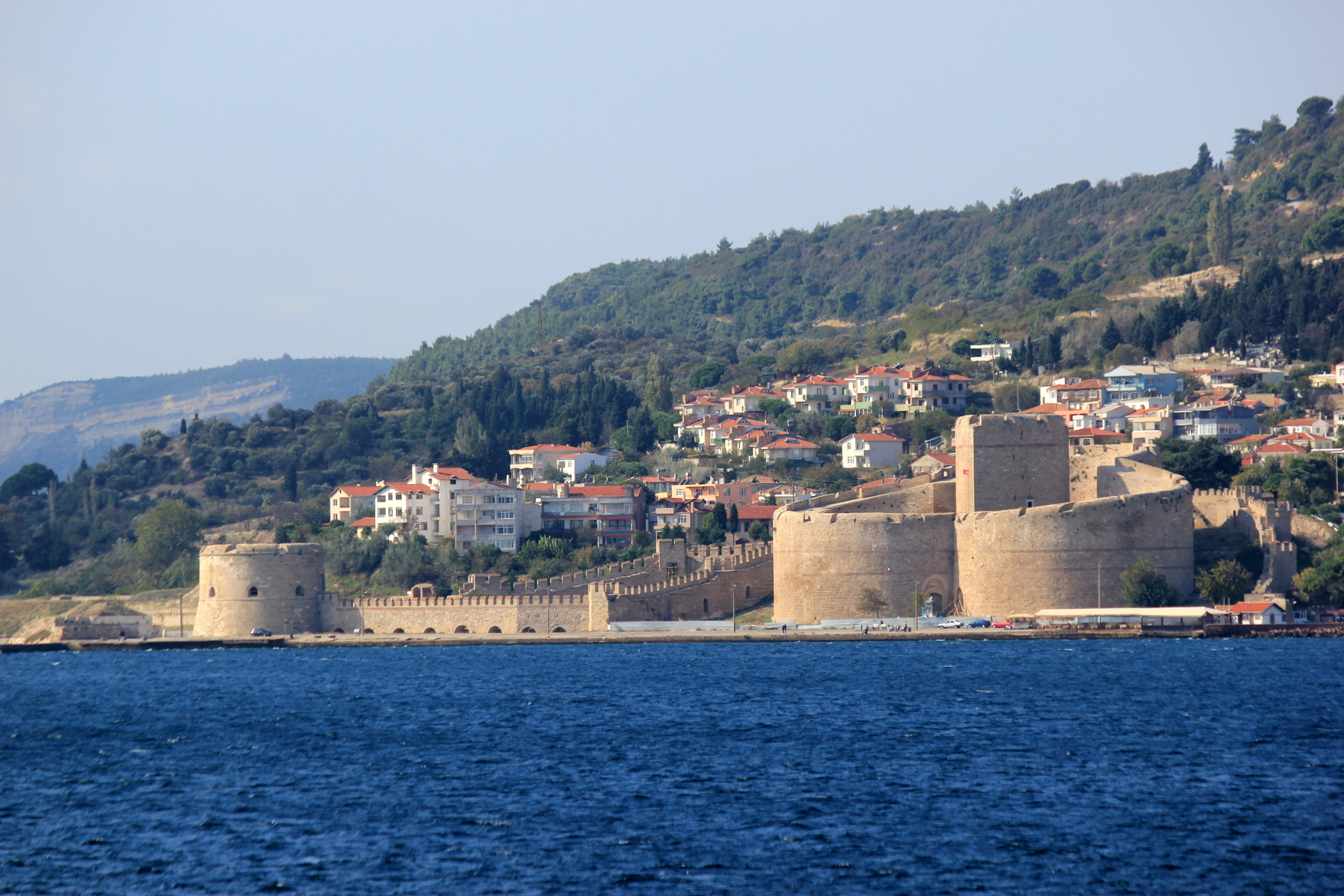
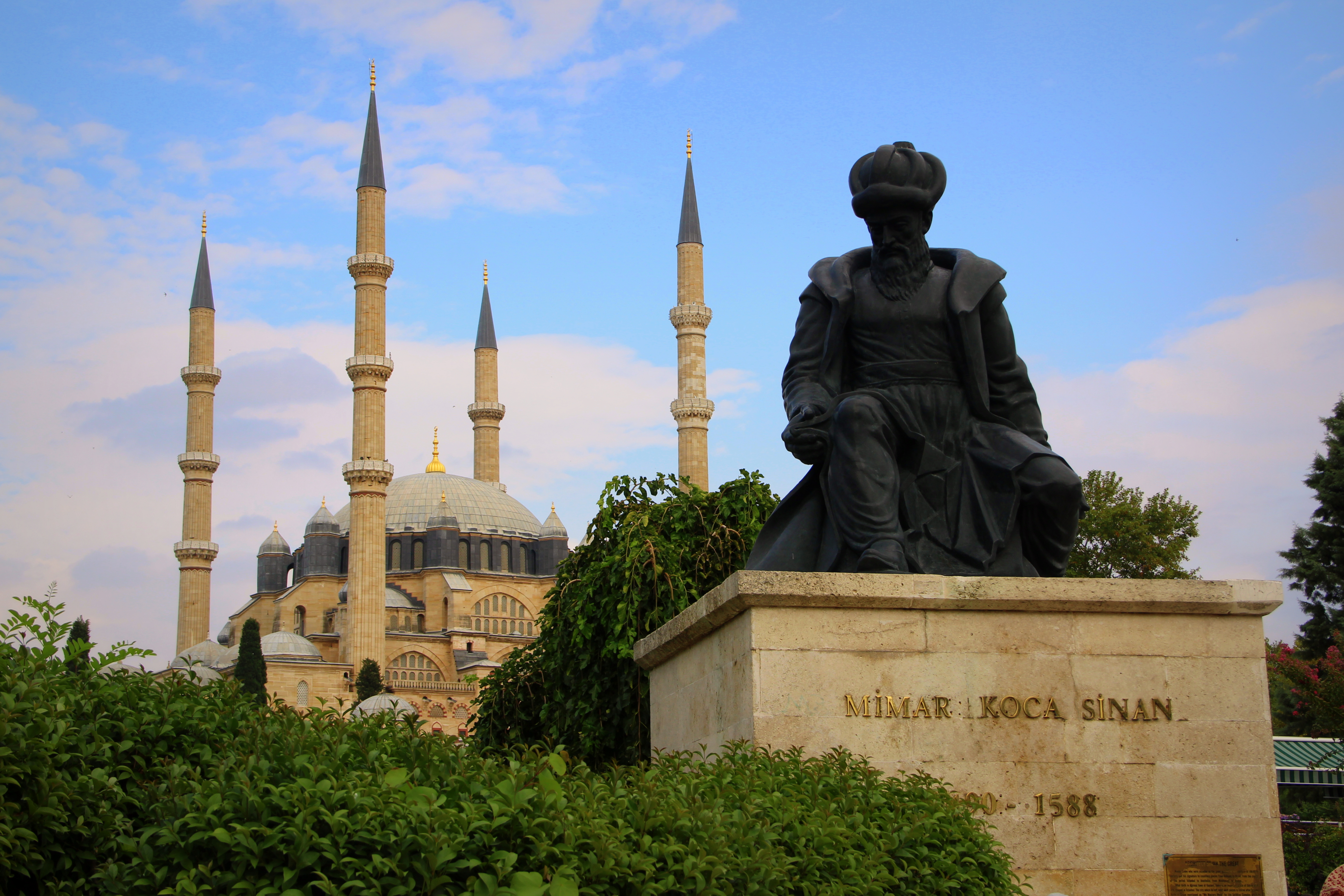

- Coordinates: 41°00′N 29°00′E
- Country: Turkey
- Capital: Istanbul
- Provinces: 11: Balikesir; Bilecik; Bursa; Çanakkale; Edirne; Istanbul; Kırklareli; Kocaeli; Sakarya; Tekirdağ; Yalova

Area
  - Total: 67,000 km^{2} (26,000 sq mi)
  - Rank: 6th

Population (Jan. 2022)(INSEE)
  - Total: 27,050,405
  - Rank: 1st
  - Density: 400/km^{2} (1,000/sq mi)
- Demonym: Turkish: Marmaralı

GDP
  - Total: US$ 367.040 billion (2022)
  - Per capita: US$ 13,569 (2022)
- Time zone: UTC+03:00 (TRT)
  - Summer (DST): UTC+03:00 (TRT)
- ISO 3166 code: TR-IDF
- NUTS Region: TR1
- Website: marmara.gov.tr

The Marmara region (Turkish: Marmara Bölgesi) is a geographical region of Turkey.

It is bordered by Greece and the Aegean Sea to the west, Bulgaria and the Black Sea to the north, the Black Sea Region to the east, and the Aegean Region to the south. At the center of the region is the Sea of Marmara, which gives the region its name. The largest city in the region is Istanbul. Other big cities are Bursa, İzmit, Balıkesir, Tekirdağ, Çanakkale and Edirne.

Among the seven geographical regions, the Marmara region has the second-smallest area, yet the largest population; it is the most densely populated region in the country.

It includes the region of East Thrace.

== Etymology ==
The region is named for the Sea of Marmara, which in turn is named after Marmara Island, named for the marble (μάρμαρος) found there.

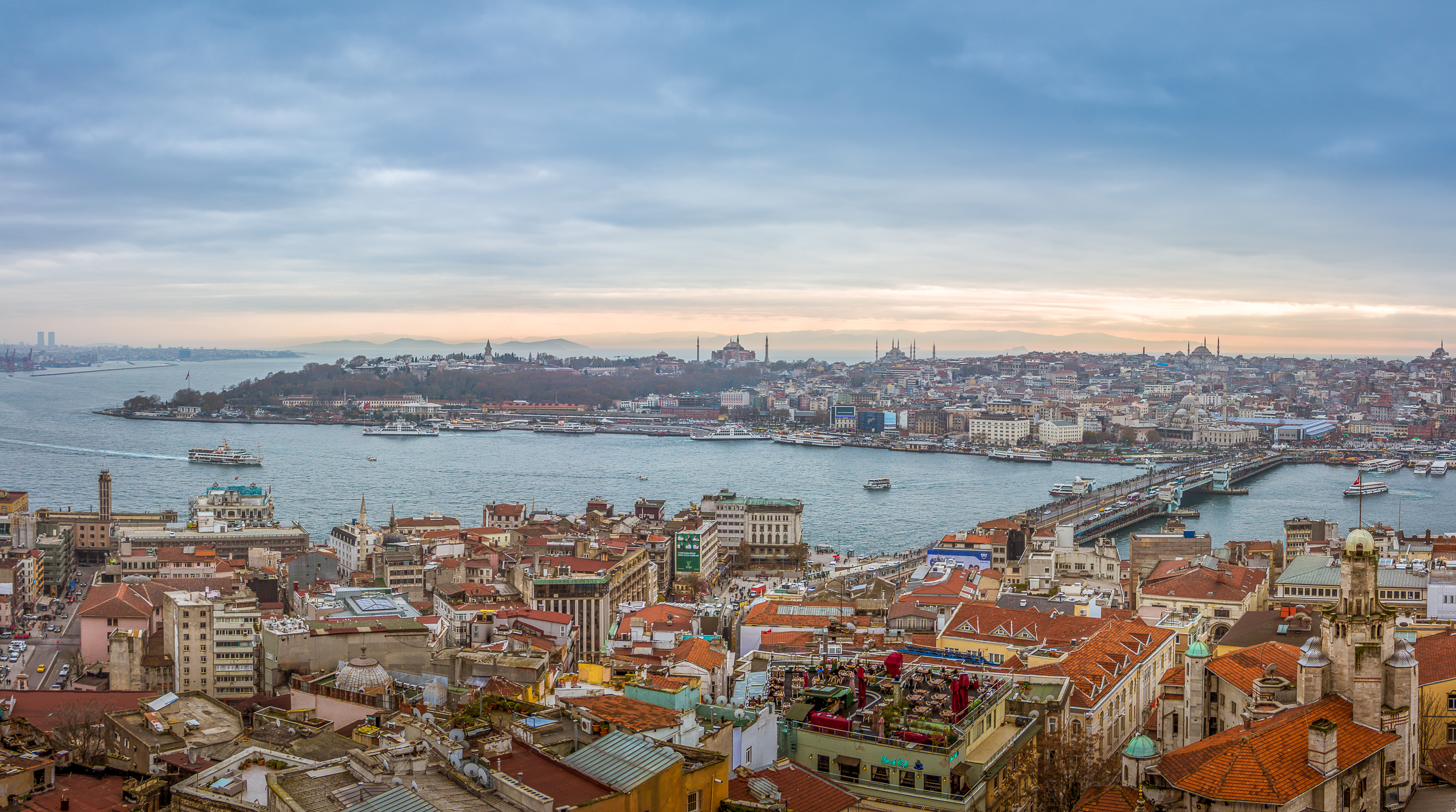
Panorama of Istanbul taken from Galata Tower. From left to right you can see the asian side of the city, Topkapi Palace, Hagia Sophia, the Blue Mosque, Galata Bridge and the New Mosque.

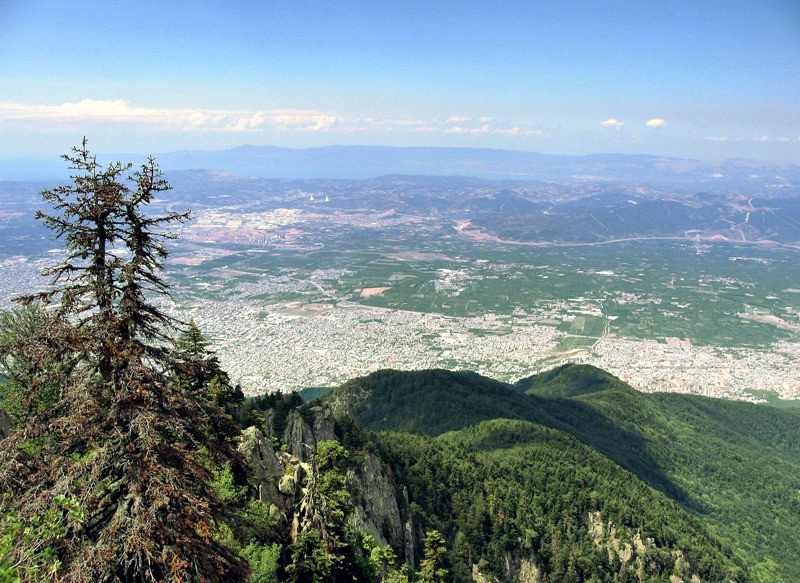
View of Bursa from the hills near Mount Uludağ, the ancient Mysian Olympus

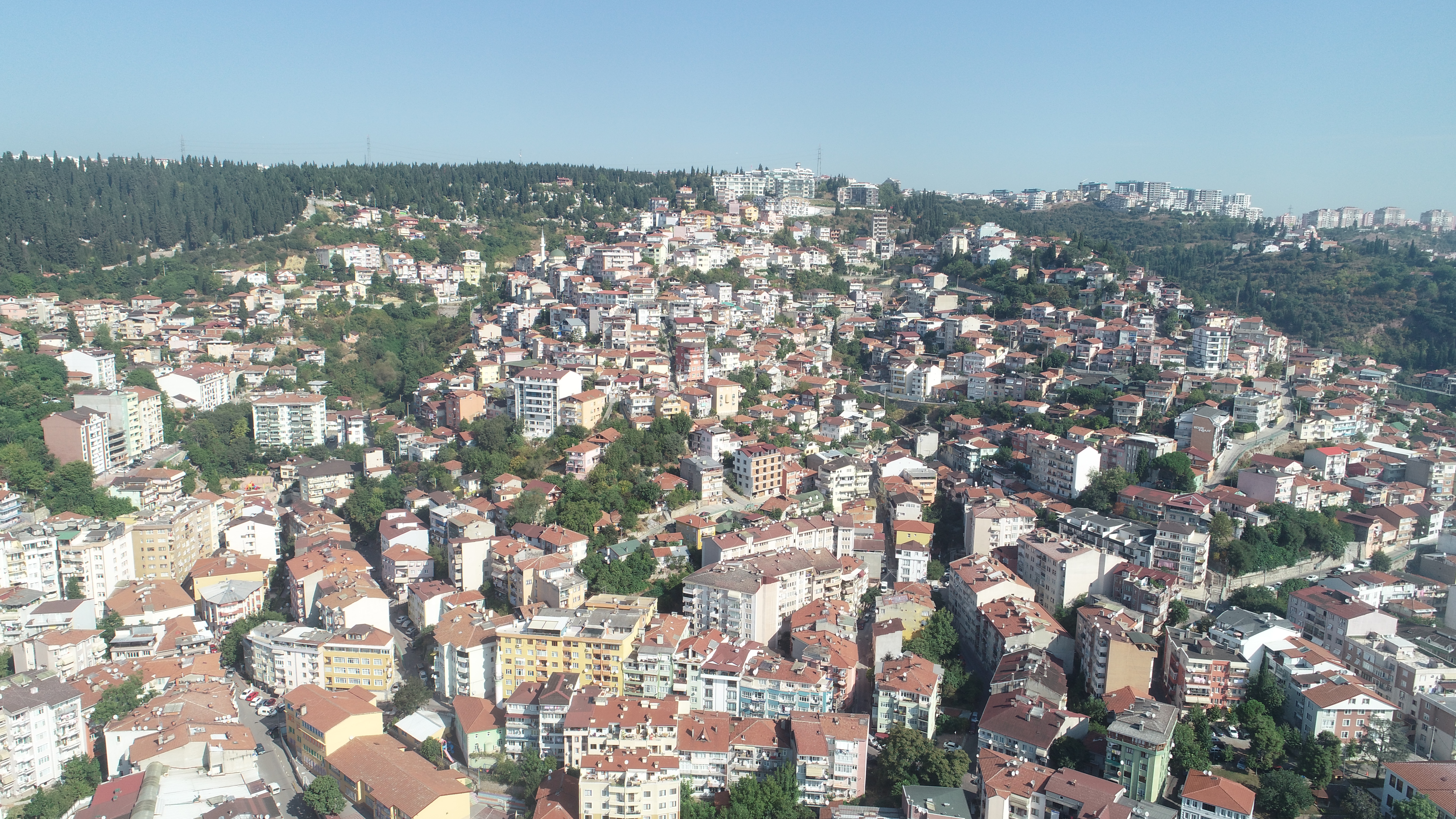
Izmit General View

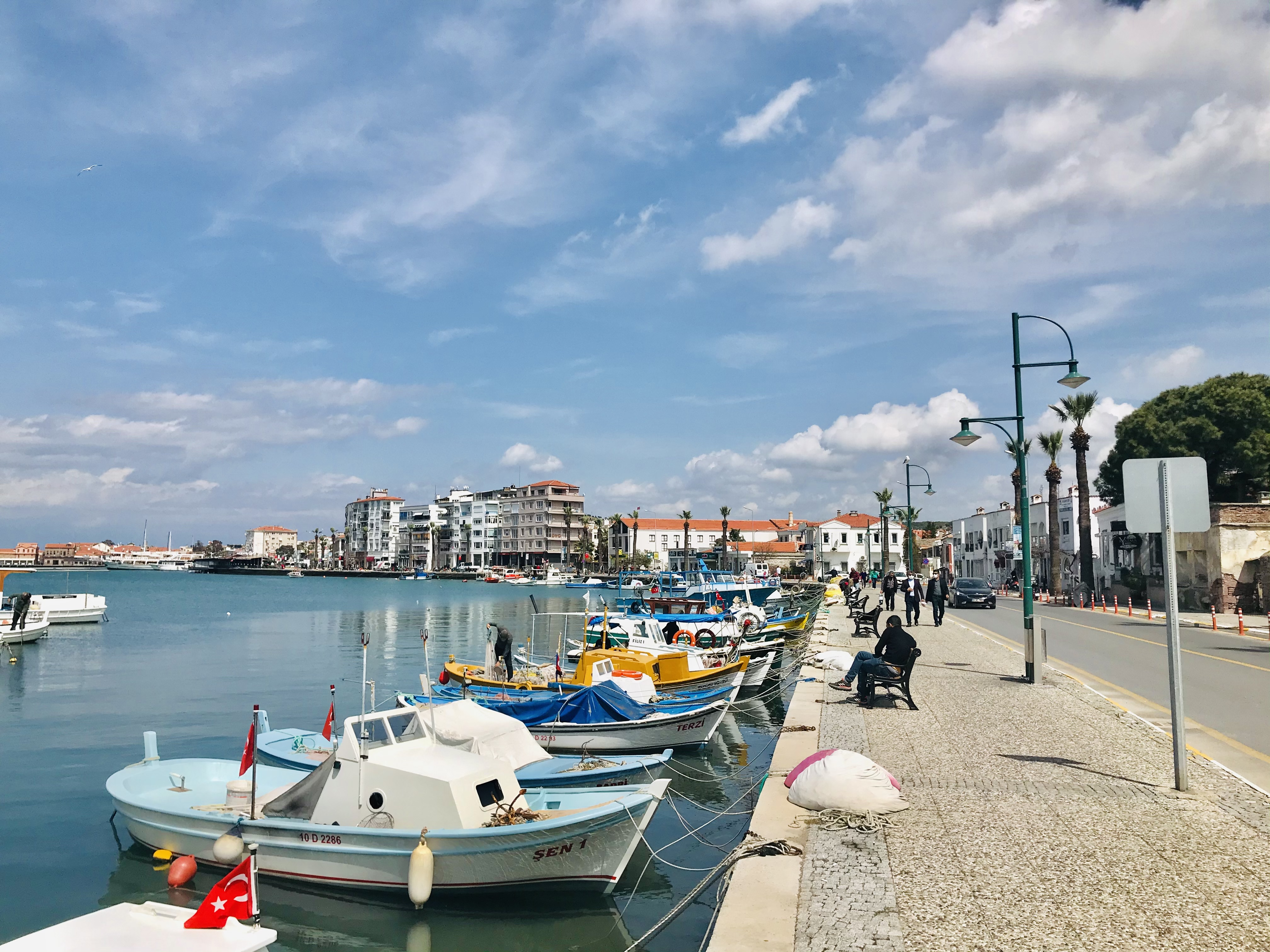
Ayvalık, Balıkesir

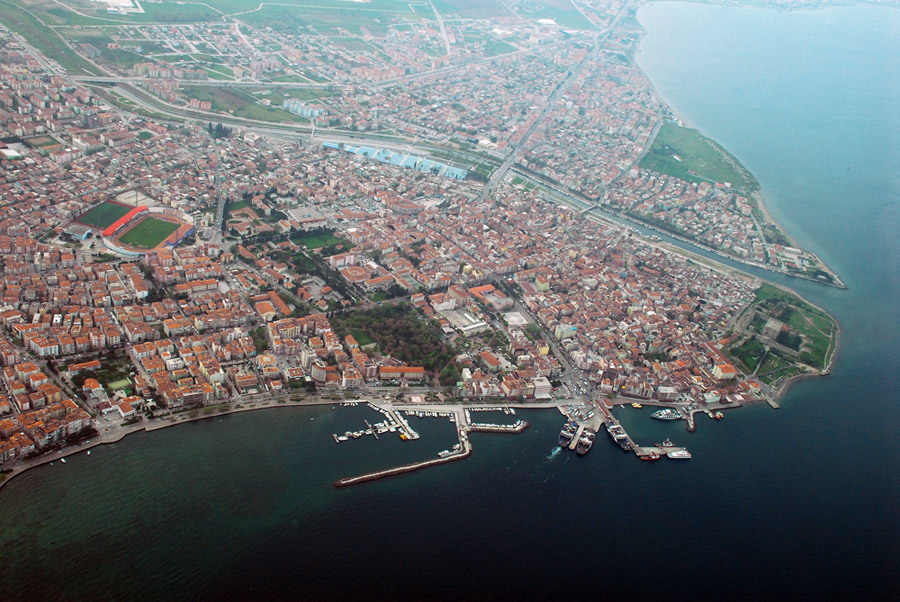
Çanakkale

== Subdivision ==
- Çatalca - Kocaeli Section (Turkish: Çatalca - Kocaeli Bölümü)
  - Adapazarı Area (Turkish: Adapazarı Yöresi)
  - Istanbul Area (Turkish: Istanbul Yöresi)
- Ergene Section (Turkish: Ergene Yöresi)
- Southern Marmara Section (Turkish: Güney Marmara Bölümü)
  - Biga - Gallipoli Area (Turkish: Biga - Gelibolu Yöresi)
  - Bursa Area (Turkish: Bursa Yöresi)
  - Karesi Area (Turkish: Karesi Yöresi)
  - Samanlı Area (Turkish: Samanlı Yöresi)
- Yıldız Section (Turkish: Yıldız Bölümü)

== Ecoregions ==
=== Terrestrial ===
==== Palearctic ====
===== Temperate broadleaf and mixed forests =====
- Balkan mixed forests
- Euxine-Colchic deciduous forests

===== Temperate coniferous forests =====
- Northern Anatolian conifer and deciduous forests (Turkey)

===== Mediterranean forests, woodlands, and scrub =====
- Aegean and Western Turkey sclerophyllous and mixed forests
- Anatolian conifer and deciduous mixed forests

== Provinces ==
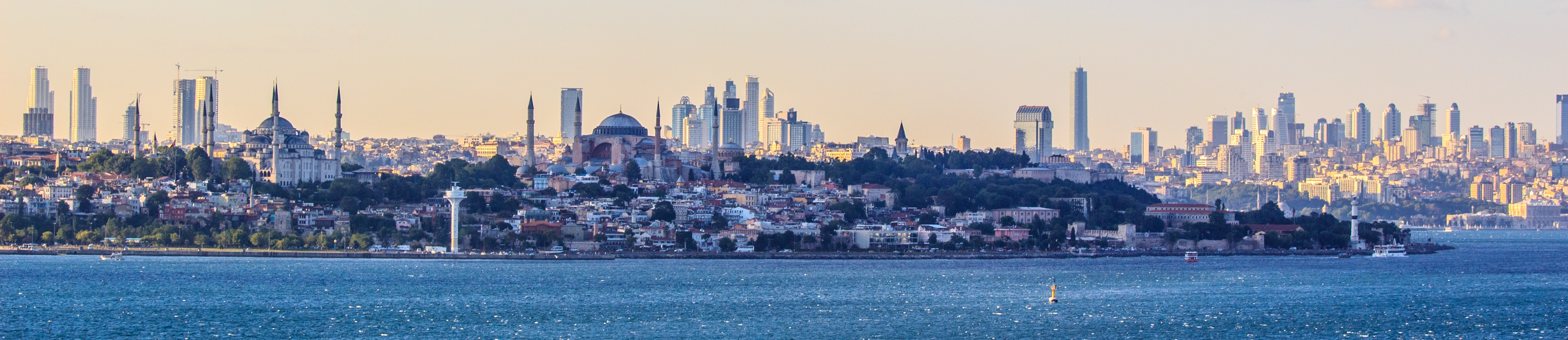
Panoramic view of Istanbul

Provinces that are entirely in the Marmara Region:

- Edirne
- İstanbul
- Kırklareli
- Kocaeli
- Tekirdağ
- Yalova

Provinces that are mostly in the Marmara Region:

- Balıkesir
- Bilecik
- Bursa
- Çanakkale
- Sakarya
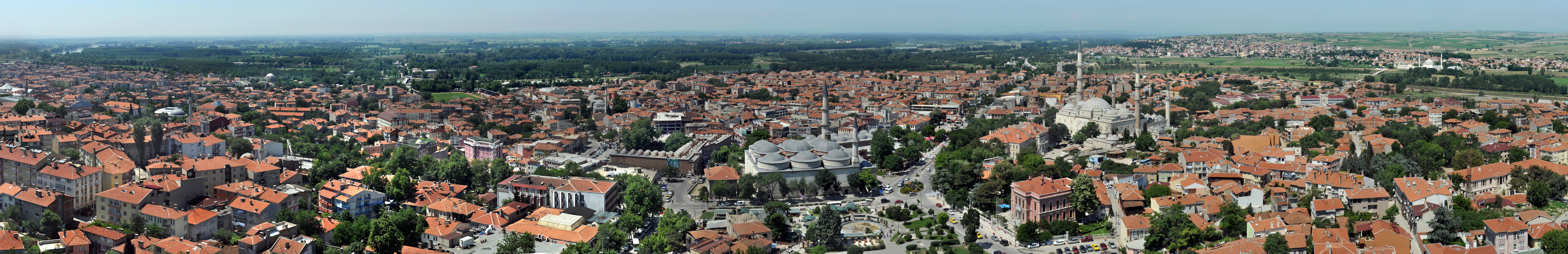
Panoramic view of Edirne from Selimiye Mosque.

== Geography ==
The Yıldız Mountains and Uludağ are in the Marmara Region. Islands in the Aegean Sea are Gökçeada and Bozcaada, and in the Sea of Marmara are Marmara Island, Avşa, Paşalimanı, İmralı and the Princes' Islands of Istanbul.

=== Climate ===
The Marmara region has a borderline Mediterranean and humid subtropical climate on the Aegean Sea and south Marmara Sea coasts, and an oceanic climate on the Black Sea coast. Summers are warm to hot and moderately dry whereas winters are cool, wet and sometimes snowy. The coastal climate keeps the temperatures relatively mild.

== See also ==
- Dardanelles
- Bosporus
- Turkish Straits
- Geographical regions of Turkey
- Provinces of Turkey
