= Kleovoulos Klonis =

Greek journalist

Kleovoulos Klonis (c. 1900 – December 2, 1988) was a Greek scenographer and journalist.

Born in Koutali, Propontis, he grew up in Piraeus. Klonis studied at the University of Athens and the National Technical University of Athens.

He began his career as a journalist in the 1920s, contributing to various publications and illustrating his own articles. Klonis's scenic design career started in 1926 with the operetta Miss Charleston. He joined the "Eleftheri Skini" theater in 1929, and from 1931, he collaborated with the National Theatre of Greece for 50 years.

Klonis was known for his work in ancient Greek theater scenic design, notably at outdoor venues like Epidaurus and the Herodeion. In partnership with Antonis Fokas, he worked on over 500 theatrical productions. He also collaborated with the Greek National Opera from 1939 to 1973, and the National Theatre of Northern Greece.

Klonis received several awards, including the silver medal from the Academy of Athens. He died in 1988 in Athens and was buried in the First Cemetery of Athens.
