= Topağaç, Marmara =

Topağaç
- Neighbourhood
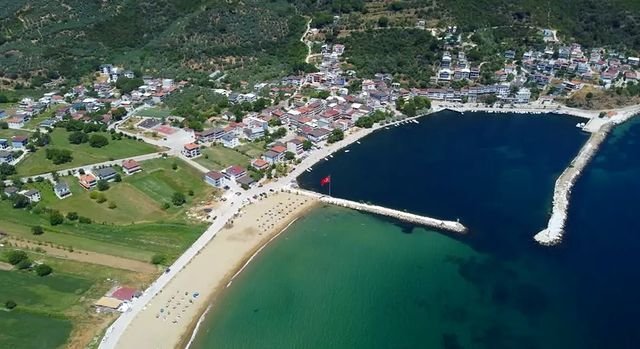

- Country: Turkey
- Municipality: Marmara
- Elevation: 5 m (16 ft)
- Population (2025): 688
- Time zone: UTC+3 (TRT)
- Area code: 0266

Topağaç is a neighborhood in the Marmara District of Balıkesir Province.

Topağaç is a neighborhood located on the southern coast of the island, known for its expansive agricultural lands and often referred to as "the island's fruit and vegetable warehouse." The local population earns their livelihood through agriculture, fishing, and marble mining, and it is also one of the neighborhoods on the island with the highest number of summer residents. Additionally, due to clean beaches in Marmara Sea, it is a popular destination for local tourists during the summer months. The swamp that once covered a large part of the town and the mouth of the plain was largely filled with rocks and gravel in order to combat malaria and create a more suitable foundation for settlement. As a result of this filling process, the productivity of agricultural lands and wetlands was increased.

== Geography ==
Topağaç is 12 km from the district center and 141 km from the provincial center. Located 230 meters south of the Topağaç harbor is the Laz Kayası coral reef area.

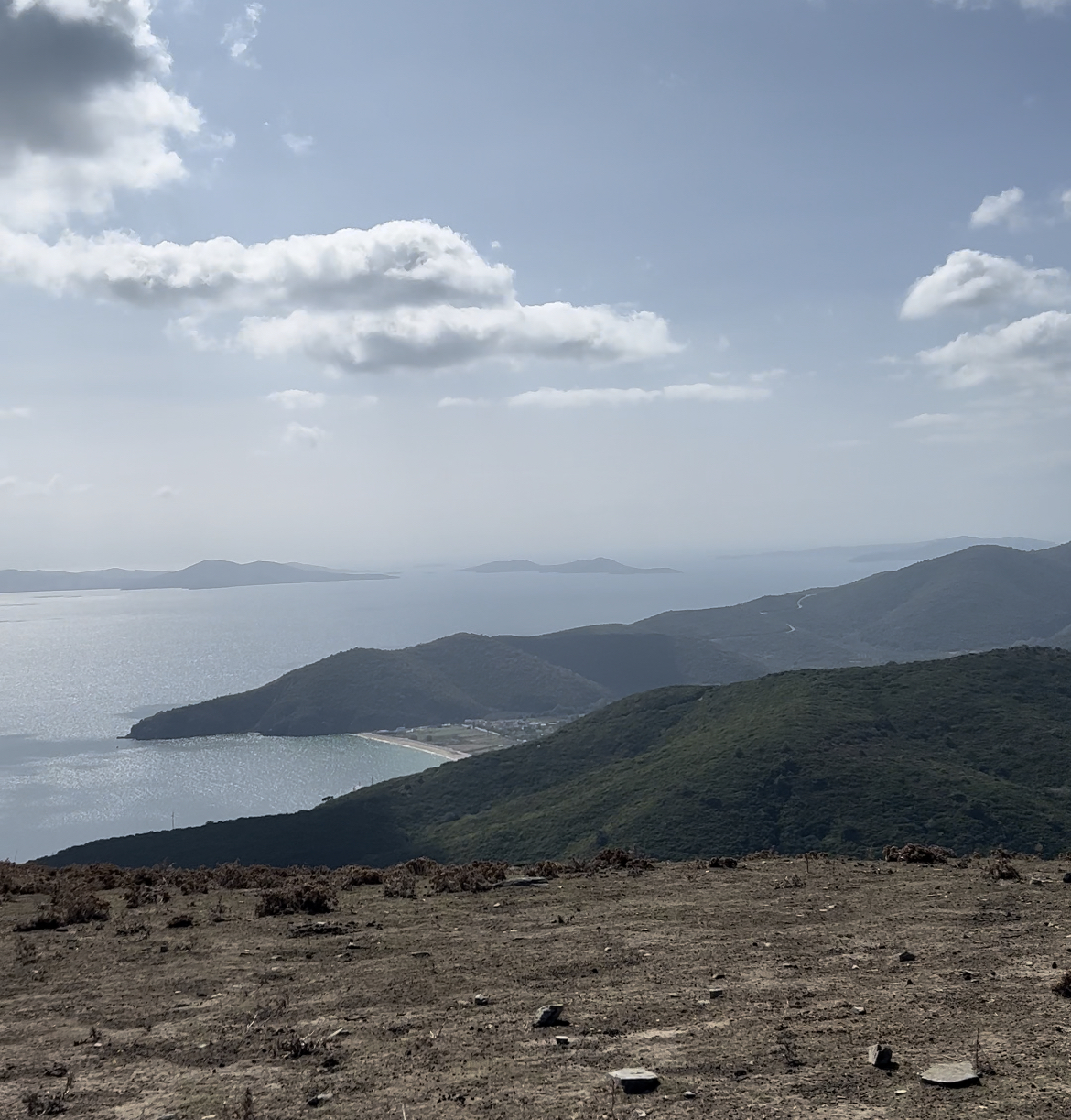
View of Topağaç Plain from Tahtırevan Hill, with the Marmara Archipelago in the Background

The northern part of the village is a region encircled by the Ilyas Mountains and the Tahtırevan area. This region contains natural wildlife, where various wild farm animals and feral horses can be easily seen. Tahtırevan can be accessed from Topağaç’s Paşabayırı locality via paths and unpaved roads. This area provides a popular route for nature hikers.

== History ==
The neighborhood's name is recorded as Klazáki or Lazaki in the 1795 records, and as Kılazak in the 1911 records. Previously a neighborhood of Asmalı Village, it gained the status of a village on December 22, 1952. After the legislative change in 2012, it was restored to the status of a neighborhood.

Topağaç (Klazaki), although a small town during the Ottoman period, made a name for itself among the surrounding authorities. Originally inhabited by Greek Orthodox Christians, this town is described by Gedeon as a miserable place cursed by a bishop. This curse likely stemmed from the residents' conversions to Islam to avoid paying the kliaratch (tribute). According to Dallaway, "The Ottomans, not wanting to encourage this behavior at the expense of revenue loss and fearing the spread of such actions, imposed double taxation on the inhabitants of Topağaç."

Later on, the Topağaç Plain and its famous marshland, which was a breeding ground for malaria at the time, led those who acquired land there to temporarily settle in Asmalı Village to the north. Permanent settlement in Topağaç Village began in 1928 with migrants from Greece, and in 1930, worker families from Karabiga were also settled there. Families from Rize and Çayeli, however, settled in the western part of the island in Çınarlı Village in 1927.

=== Agios Timotheos ===
The Agios Timotheos Monastery, located in Topağaç Neighborhood, is a historical structure. Built in the 6th century, the monastery is situated at an elevation of 600 meters on Karalı Mountain. According to a local legend, this site is also known for its famous holy spring, commonly referred to as "ayazma." The legend claims that a daughter of Byzantine Emperor Justinian the Great, who was possessed by demons, was sent to Marmara Island by her father. While wandering the island's mountains, she discovered the sacred spring (ayazma). After drinking its water, she recovered with the help of St. Timothy of Proconessus and returned to the palace. Saint Timothy reposed in peace on August 1. In gratitude, Empress Theodora established a monastery at the healing site, where his relics were found and a sacred spring emerged. The monastery hosted an annual festivals in his honor, and Saint Timothy is venerated as the patron saint of the island. In the early 20th century, the spring was converted into a water mill, with some additions to its walls reflecting this transformation.

The monastery is a complex consisting of twelve cells, a church, and other partially underground structures, preserving its historical significance. However, it suffered considerable damage over time, especially after the 1935 earthquake. Today, it is protected as a cultural heritage site, with its structural remains and cultural values preserved.

A depiction of Topağaç and the Timotheos Monastery is featured in the icon of Saint Timotheos at the Agios Georgios Karipis Monastery on Burgazada. This icon was painted by K. Dimarchopoulos and presented to the Agios Georgios Karipis Monastery by Theofanis Theofanidis in 1927.

== Population ==
Population data of the neighborhood by years
2025	688
2020	539
2015	522
2010	451
2000	513
1990	374
