= Koyun Island =

Island in Turkey

Native name: Koyun Adası
- Location within Turkey

Geography
- Location: Marmara
- Coordinates: 40°30′33″N 27°34′40″E

Administration
- Turkey
- İl (province): Balıkesir Province
- İlçe: Bandırma

Koyun Island (Turkish: Koyun Adası, literally "Sheep Island") is a Turkish island in the Sea of Marmara. At 40°30′33″N 27°34′40″E it is a part of Erdek ilçe (district) of Balıkesir Province. It is situated between the better known islands of Avşa Island and Paşalimanı Island.

The island is a long island from north to south. Its total area is about 1.7 square kilometres (0.66 sq mi). There are only a few summer houses on the otherwise uninhabited island.
