= Bandırma Gulf =

Gulf in Turkey

Coordinates: 40°23′N 27°59′E

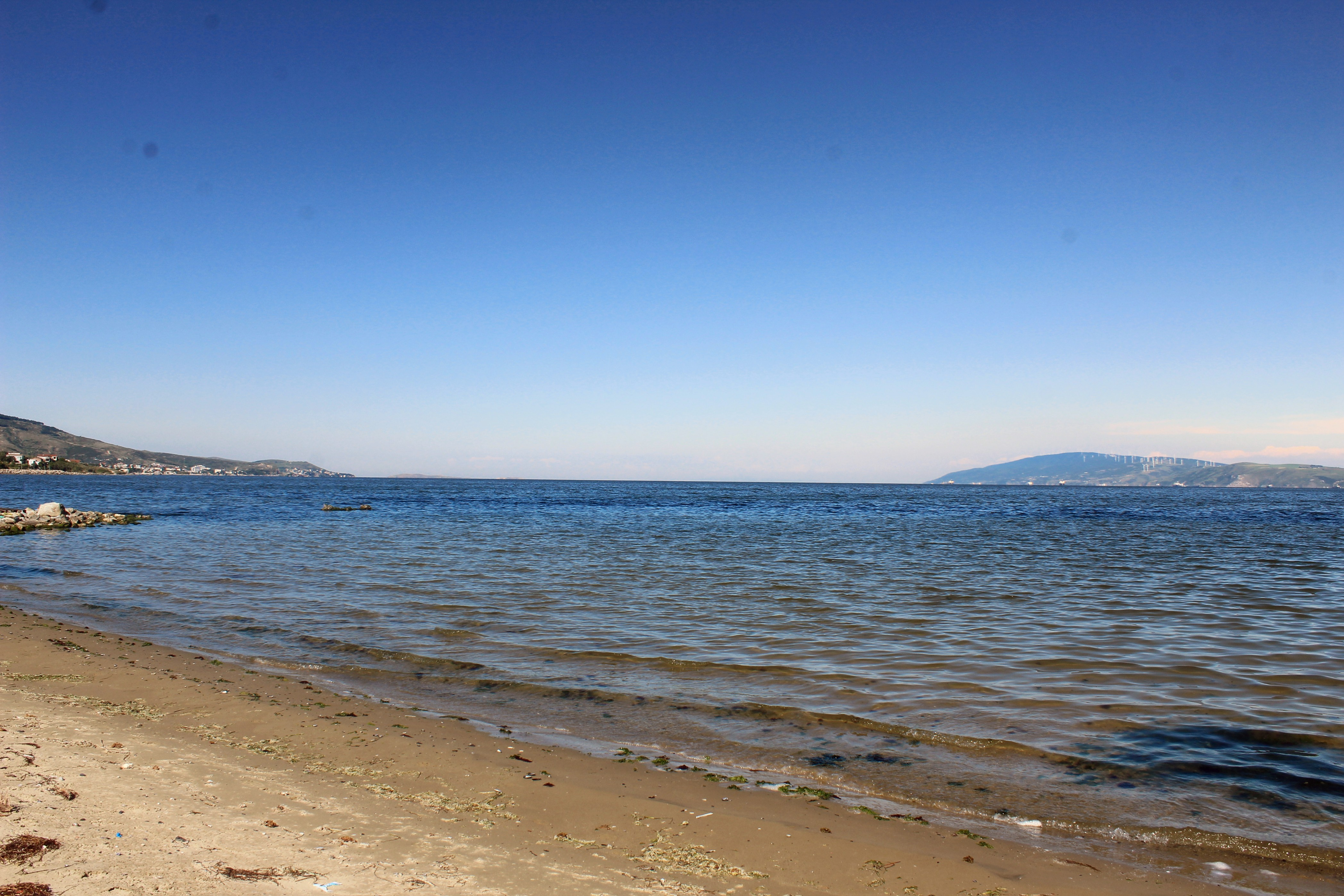
Bandırma Gulf in 2025

Bandırma Gulf is a gulf on the Anatolian side of the Marmara Sea in Turkey. It is administratively a part of Bandırma district of Balıkesir Province.

Belkıs Tombolo (connecting the Kapıdağ Peninsula to the Anatolia mainland) is to the west, the Kapıdağ Peninsula is to the north and the Marmara coast of Anatolia is to the south. The Mola group of islands is to the northeast of the gulf. The main settlement of the bay is Bandırma, an industrial city and a port .

The two main ferry services in the gulf are from Bandırma to Tekirdağ in the Thracean (European) part of Turkey and to Yenikapı and Kadıköy on the European and Anatolian sides of Istanbul.
