= Kapıdağ Peninsula =

Tombolo in Balıkesir Province, northwestern Turkey

Native name: Kapıdağ Yarımadası
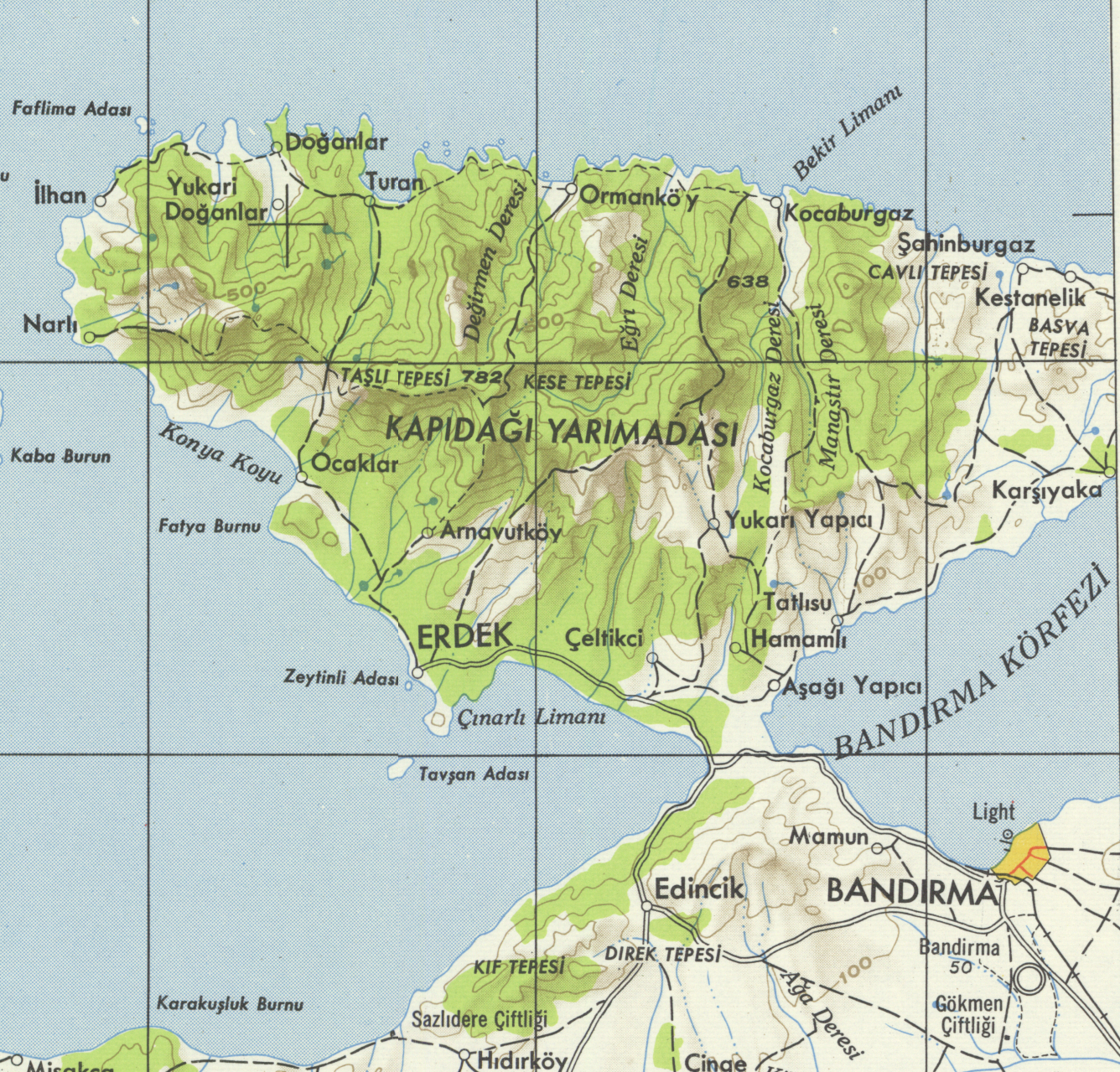
- 1956 map of the Kapidag Peninsula
- Interactive map of Kapıdağ Peninsula

Geography
- Location: Marmara Sea
- Coordinates: 40.45949°N 27.85172°E

Administration
- Turkey
- Region: Marmara
- Provinces: Balıkesir
- Cities and towns: Erdek

Kapıdağ Peninsula (Turkish: Kapıdağ Yarımadası) is a tied island in northwestern Anatolia extending into the Sea of Marmara in Balıkesir Province, Turkey. The peninsula forms the Gulf of Bandırma on its east and the Gulf of Erdek on its west.

Kapıdağ was the classical island of ancient Greek Arctonnesus, but was joined to the mainland by a narrow isthmus in historic times either by an earthquake or (according to legend) by Alexander the Great. It was also known as the Peninsula of Cyzicus after its chief town.

Cyzicus was abandoned following a series of severe earthquakes, but served from 1303 to 1304 as the base of the Catalan Company of the East and was the site of the Battle of the Cyzicus in October 1303. After its conquest by the Ottoman Empire, it was part of the kaza of Erdek in the province of Bursa.

== Locations ==
Erdek, a small town known as a seaside resort, is located in the Gulf of Erdek west of the peninsula. Erdek hosts a naval base of the Turkish Navy.
