= Erdek =

- District and municipality
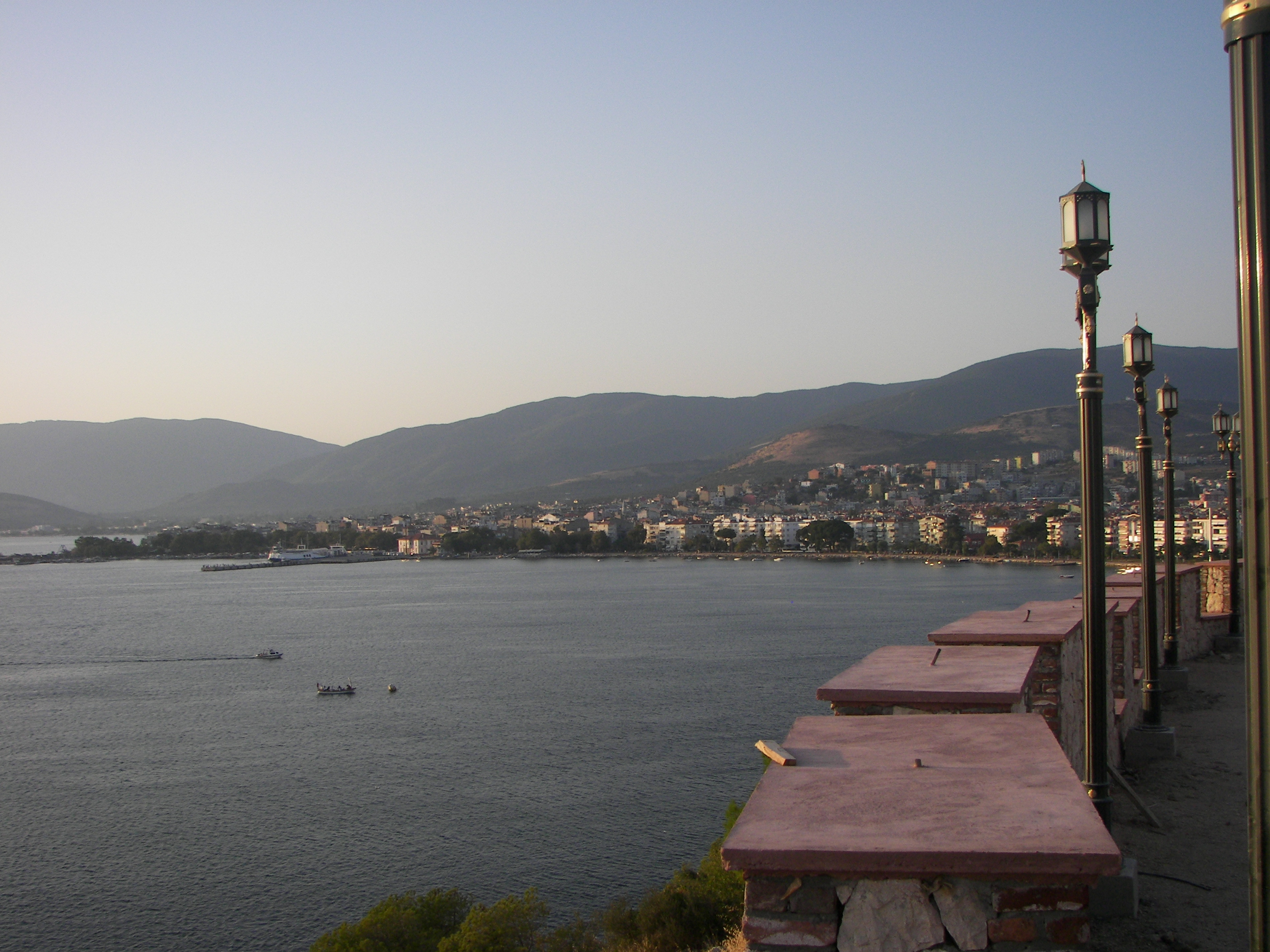
- Gulf of Erdek

- Map showing Erdek District in Balıkesir Province

- Location within Turkey Location within Marmara
- Coordinates: 40°23′53″N 27°47′29″E
- Country: Turkey
- Province: Balıkesir

Government
  - Mayor: Burhan Karışık (CHP)
- Area: 307 km^{2} (119 sq mi)
- Population (2024): 32,021
  - Density: 104/km^{2} (270/sq mi)
- Time zone: UTC+3 (TRT)
- Postal code: 10550
- Area code: 0266
- Website: www.erdek.bel.tr

Erdek is a municipality and district of Balıkesir Province, Turkey. Its area is 307 km^{2}, and its population is 32,021 (2024). Located on the Kapıdağ Peninsula, on the north coast of the Gulf of Erdek at the south of the Sea of Marmara, Erdek is a popular domestic holiday destination with several hotels dating back to the 1960s. The surrounding area has a rugged geology and topography with evergreen wooded areas and large olive groves. It is dominated by Mt Dindymus (782m). Erdek district also included the islands of Koyun and Paşalimanı.

In the summer ferries travel from Erdek to Avşa Adası, one of the Marmara Islands in the Sea of Marmara. The harbour overlooks tiny Zeytinlik island where there is a research station devoted to olives.

== History ==
During the Hittite era it was known as Artukka. Later it became a colony of Miletus. Together with other Greek cities, it took part in the Ionian Revolt against the Persian Empire, but was burned by the Persians; it seems unlikely that it was rebuilt in ancient times since Strabo does not mention it. In the Roman period it was known as Artace.

During the Ottoman period, Erdek was the centre of the Sanjak of Karasi. According to the Ottoman General Census of 1881/82–1893, the kaza of Erdek had a total population of 33,007, consisting of 29,165 Greeks, 3,070 Muslims, 300 Jews, 18 Armenians and 454 foreign citizens.

In the 1960s, before Bodrum and Marmaris became popular vacation spots, Erdek was a fashionable holiday resort for Istanbul residents. The Pinar Oteli was the most popular place to stay then and is still in business today.

== Composition ==
There are 28 neighbourhoods (including villages) in Erdek District:

- Alaaddin
- Aşağıyapıcı
- Atatürk
- Balıklı
- Ballıpınar
- Belkıs
- Çakılköy
- Çeltikçi
- Doğanlar
- Halitpaşa
- Hamamlı
- Harmanlı
- İlhanköy
- Karşıyaka
- Kestanelik
- Narlı
- Ocaklar
- Ormanlı
- Paşalimanı
- Poyrazlı
- Sahil
- Şahinburgaz
- Tatlısu
- Turan
- Tuzla
- Yalı
- Yukarıyapıcı
- Zeytinli

== Twin towns — sister cities ==
Erdek is twinned with:

- Otranto, Italy since 2001

== See also ==
- Erdek Naval Base
- Nea Artaki, Greece
