= Paşalimanı =

Island in Turkey

Coordinates: 40°29′22″N 27°36′32″E

Paşalimanı Island (Turkish: Paşalimanı Adası), formerly Halone (Greek: Ἁλώνη), is an island in the southern Sea of Marmara in Turkey. The island is the fifth largest island of Turkey (26.2 km^{2} (10.1 sq mi)) and administratively belongs to the Erdek town of Balikesir Province in northwestern Turkey. The island has five small villages and has 962 population in total. Paşalimanı Island is also part of the Marmara Archipelago along with three other islands Marmara, Avşa and Ekinlik.

== History ==
Paşalimani Island was first inhabited during the Chalcolithic age same as the neighbouring islands of Avşa and Marmara. According to Hittite sources the area was under the rule of Troy (Wilusa) during 1300s BC. In 844 BC Ionian colonizers from Miletus occupied the area and they were the first Greek-speaking inhabitants. In 493 BC the island was ravaged by Phoenicians since the islanders were against the Persian invasions. Consequently new Ionian settlers brought and settled from Miletus and Samos island. Halonia island was under Byzantine rule until the Ottoman Empire captured the archipelago in 15th century. During the Ottoman period, until 1923 Greeks and Turks lived together in peace. In 1923 Turkey and Greece agreed to exchange the population and Greek-speaking people of the island left. Today the local people of the island are originally from Greece, Bosnia and Black Sea Region of Turkey.

== Climate ==
Paşalimanı Island has predominantly Mediterranean climate, at the same time some effects of the Black Sea climate are observed. It gets more rainfall in the summer months comparing to the Mediterranean climate. During the winter the island may also gets some snow from time to time due to the cold weather from the north.

== Villages and population ==
Paşalimanı Island has five villages and does not have any administrative central town. Contrary to the other surrounding islands, Paşalimanı island belongs to Erdek District, not to Marmara, the central town of the archipelago.

- Harmanlı (Greek: Αλώνια (Alonia or Halonia)); 285 pop.
- Paşalimanı (Greek: Πασά Λιμάνι (Pasa Limani)); 180 pop.
- Poyrazlı (Greek: Βώρυ (Vori)); 184 pop.
- Balıklı (Greek: Σκοπιά (Skopia)); 159 pop.
- Tuzla (Greek: Χουχλιά (Huhlia)); 154 pop.

== See also ==
- 1935 Erdek–Marmara Islands earthquake
- Avşa Island
- Balıkesir
- List of islands of Turkey
- Marmara Island
