= Ekinlik Island =

Island in Turkey

Coordinates: 40.549°N 27.485°E

- Interactive map of Ekinlik Island

Ekinlik Island, formerly Koutalis (Greek: Κούταλης) is an island situated off the Turkish coast, in the Sea of Marmara. Administratively, the island belongs to Marmara, the central settlement of Marmara Island in Balikesir, Turkey. The island has an area of approximately 2.47 square kilometres, one village with the same name, and a population of 102, according to the 2014 census.

== History ==
According to Hititian sources Marmara Archipelago and its surrounding area belonged to the Luwian in 1000 BC, while the Greek-speaking people of the region settled during the 7th century BC to colonise the islands. The oldest records specifically on Ekinlik Island belong to the 14th century during the Byzantine period, saying that the Catalan mercenaries captured the island. In the 15th century, the island passed under Ottoman rule. In the 17th century, according to the Geographer Athenian Meletios, the island was named Koutali, which was used until 1923. In 1923, as a result of the Lausanne Treaty signed between Turkey and Greece, the island's Greek-speaking people migrated to Greece and the United States, and the settlement was placed with the people who migrated from the Black Sea region of Turkey.
