= Marmara Island =

Island in Turkey

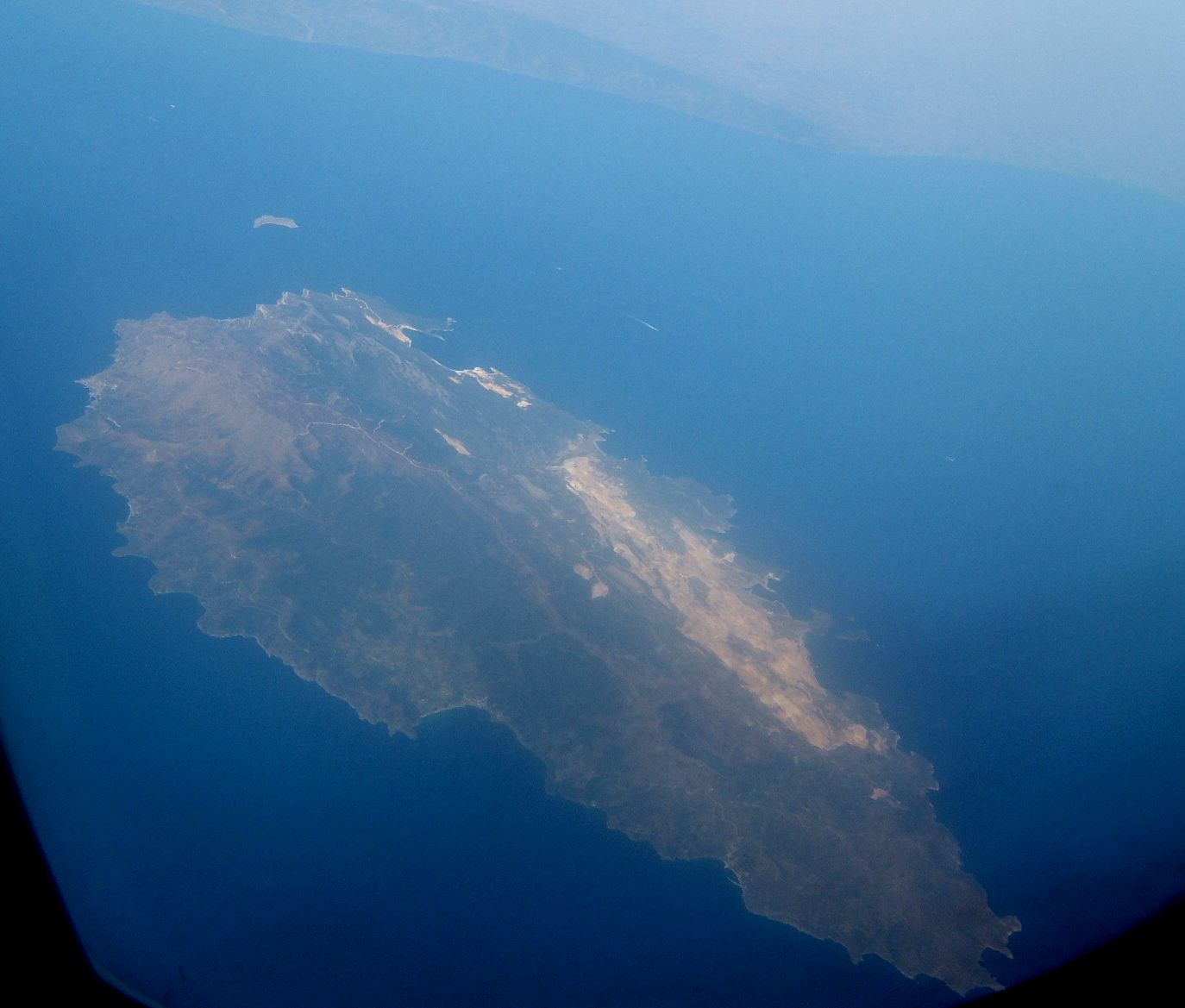
- View of Marmara from a plane

- Location within Marmara Location within Turkey
- Coordinates: 40.62°N 27.63°E
- Country: Turkey
- Region: Marmara
- Province: Balıkesir
- Area: 126.1 km^{2} (48.7 sq mi)

Marmara Island (Turkish: Marmara Adası) is a Turkish island in the Sea of Marmara. With an area of 126.1 km^{2} (48.7 sq mi), it is the largest island in the Sea of Marmara and the second-largest island of Turkey - after Gökçeada (formerly Turkish: İmroz; Greek: Ίμβρος Imvros). It is the center of Marmara District in Balıkesir Province. Ships and ferries provide transportation from Istanbul, as do motorboats from Tekirdağ and Erdek. Marmara Island has many historical artifacts. The town of Marmara on the island's south-western coast takes its name from the quarried marble (Ancient Greek: μάρμαρος, romanized: marmaros) for which the town is famous and which gives the island, the sea, and the whole region their names.

Marmara Island is notable for its diverse natural and cultural attributes. Located near Istanbul, it features clean waters, pebble and sandy beaches, and ideal trekking routes. The island experiences two distinct climates: Mediterranean on the south and Black Sea on the north side. It is renowned for having the highest mountain peak in the Marmara Sea and is home to Turkey's richest concentration of flora for its land size. Marmara Island is also unique in its support of wild horse populations and is renowned for its ancient marble quarries. Additionally, it is the birthplace of the enigmatic ancient poet Aristeas (c. seventh century BC) and is known for producing Turkey's most exquisitely flavored sage tea. The island is the only one in Turkey to offer a combination of high mountains, lowlands suitable for agriculture, streams, waterfalls, olive cultivation, tourism, and mining.

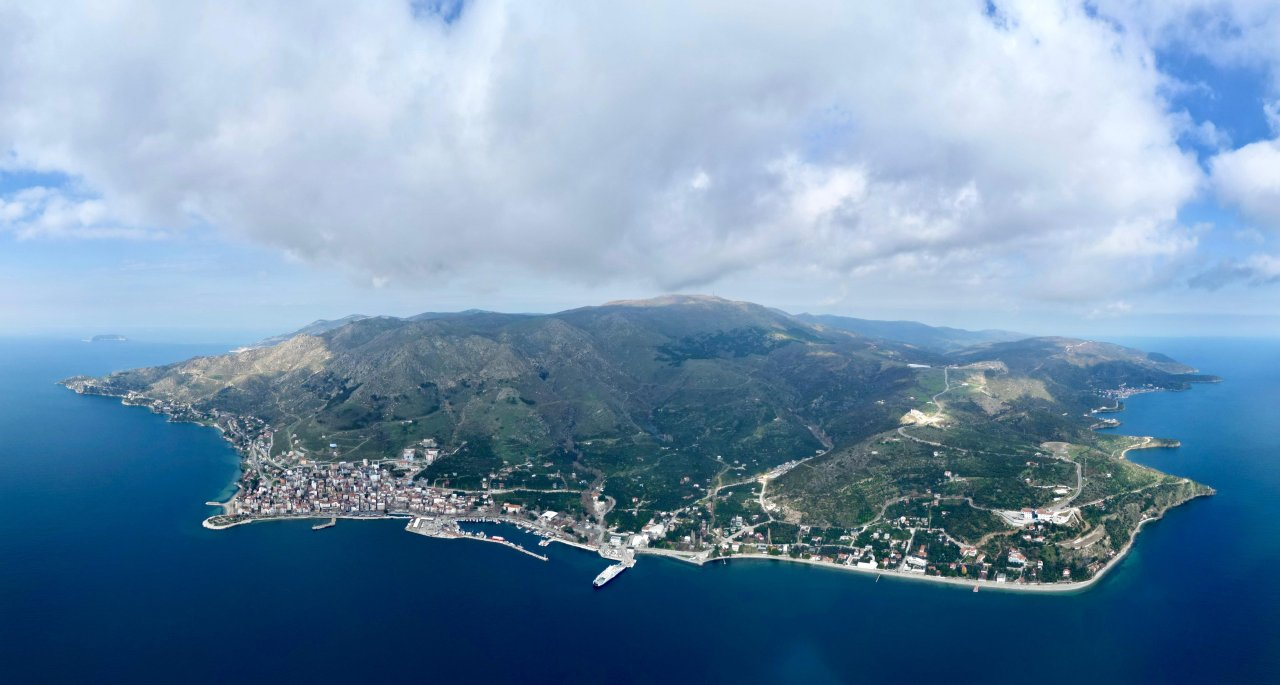
A bird's-eye view of Marmara district and the İlyas Mountains

== Etymology ==
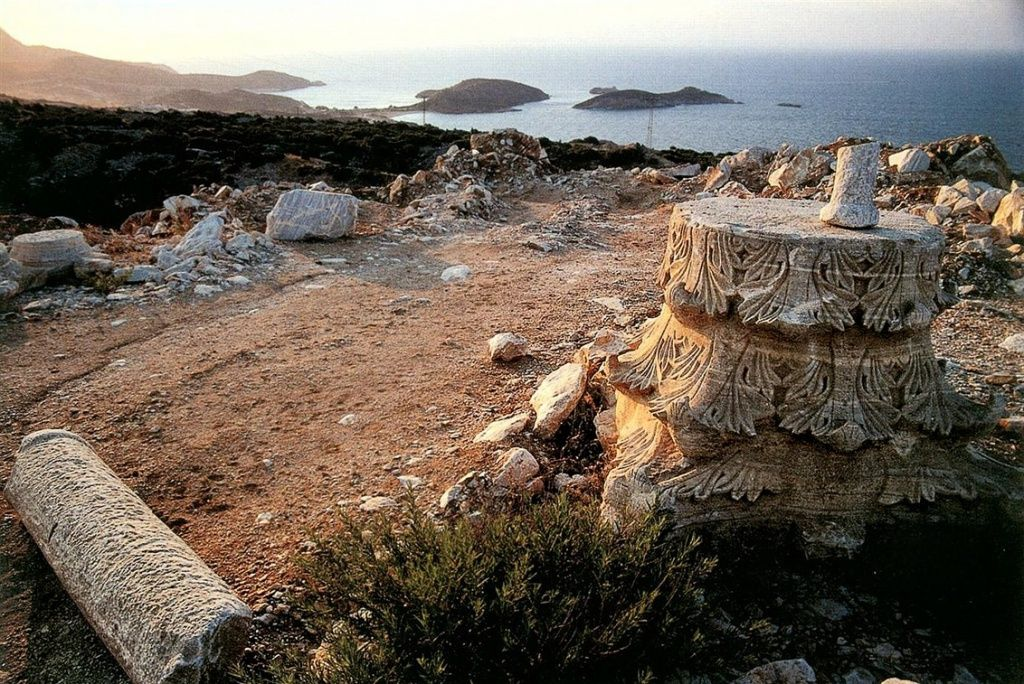
Ancient marble quaries, Abroz and Saraylar behind

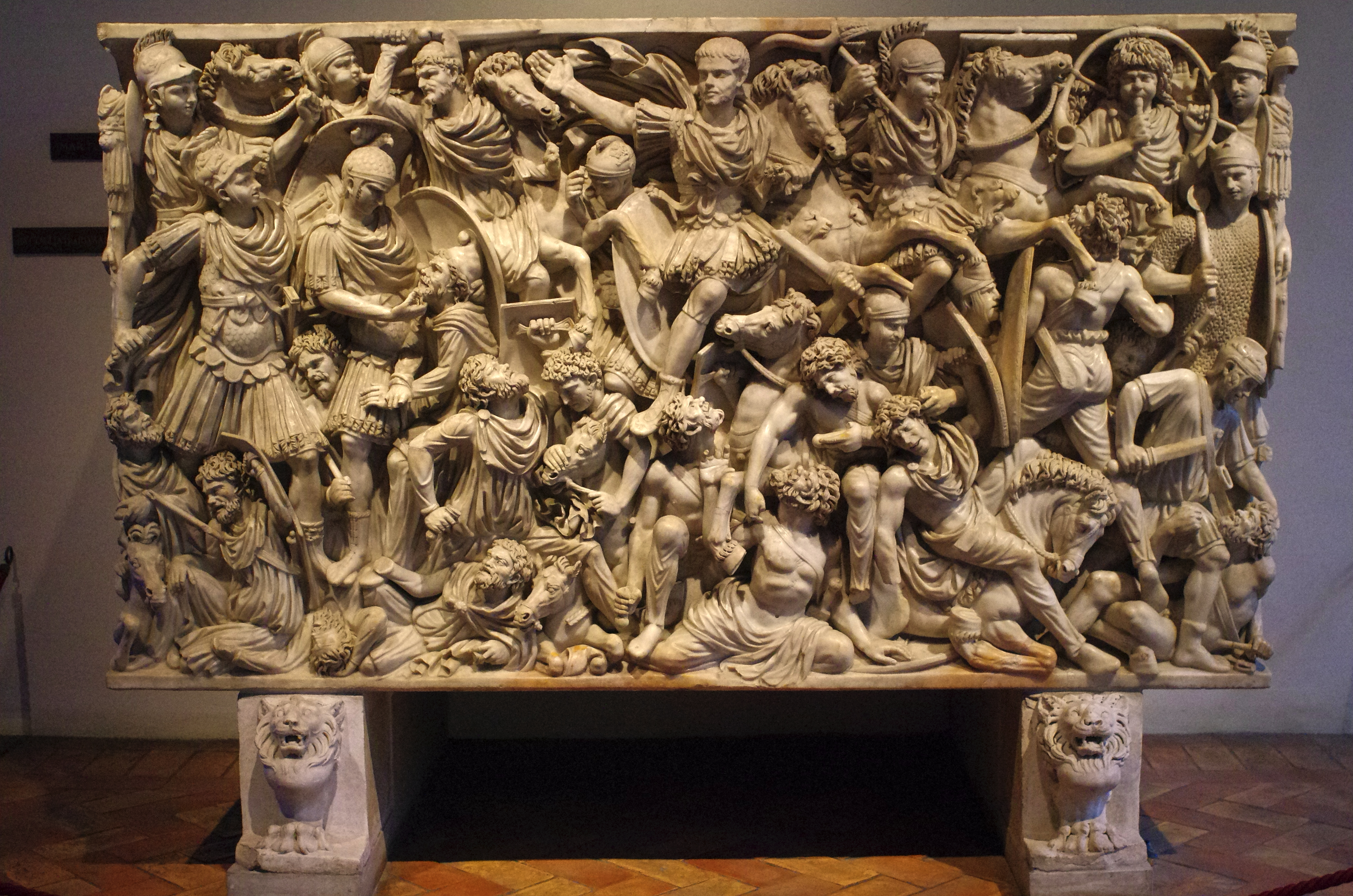
Great Ludovisi sarcophagus from the Palazzo Altemps in the National Museum of Rome – carved in Proconnesian marble

In ancient times the island was called Proikonesos (Προικόνησος) or Prokonnesos (Προκόννησος), Latinized as Proconnesus. The modern name "Marmara" is derived from the Greek μάρμαρον (marmaron) and that from μάρμαρος (mármaros), "crystalline rock", "shining stone", perhaps from the verb μαρμαίρω (marmaírō), "to flash, sparkle, gleam", because it was famous for the white marble quarried there. Under the name Proconnesus it is a titular see of the Roman Catholic Church (the see has been vacant since the death in 1963 of the most recent occupant), and of the Ecumenical Patriarchate of Constantinople.

Proconnesian marble was used extensively in the Hagia Sophia, Blue Mosque in Istanbul, Temple of Artemis at Ephesus, satrapal palace of Halicarnassus, and exclusively in the Herculean Sarcophagus of Genzano now in the British Museum. Additionally, it was used in the Basilica of Maxentius and the arch of Septimius Severus in the Roman Forum. Proconnesian marble played a significant role in meeting the marble needs of the Roman Empire (marble is still the island's primary export).

== History ==
Stories and legends identify the island of Marmara (ancient Prokonnessos) as a visiting place of Jason and the Argonauts and with the expedition against Troy, the Trojan War, which Herodotus dates around 1250 BC. Historical evidence of the first Hellenic presence on Marmara came with the early colonization of Ionian Greeks in the eighth century BC. In 493 BC, it was burned by a Phoenician fleet fighting for Darius the Great. The island was ruled for the Achaemenid Empire under a Greek tyrant named Metrodorus.

In 410 BC, Alcibiades conquered it for Athens. During the Diocletianic Persecution, Emperor Diocletian ordered low-status Manichaeans to be executed, while high-status Manichaeans were to be sent to work in the quarries of Proconnesus or the mines of Khirbat Faynan.

During the reign of Constantine the Great in the fourth century, notable aristocracy from Constantinople first settled on the island. By 569, many Byzantine aristocrats had built palaces on the island that they had accepted as their home. The greatest palace of this period was built by Emperor Justinian I. With the emperor came a large entourage of nobility, palace guards, tradesmen, and servants. Justinian also built a large convent on Marmara that is one of the earliest in recorded history. The Byzantine royal presence on the island was strongly felt through strong ties to the Patriarchate of Constantinople. During most of its history, the island was called "Proikonnesos" (island of the royal dowry), and "Prinkipo", (island of the aristocracy). In the early 13th century, the island began to be referred to as Marmara. During the 15th century, the Turks, who took control of the island, adopted the name Marmara because it was easy to pronounce, and this name has continued to the present. On Marmara Island, gravestones document the presence of Turkish and Islamic influences dating well in the past.

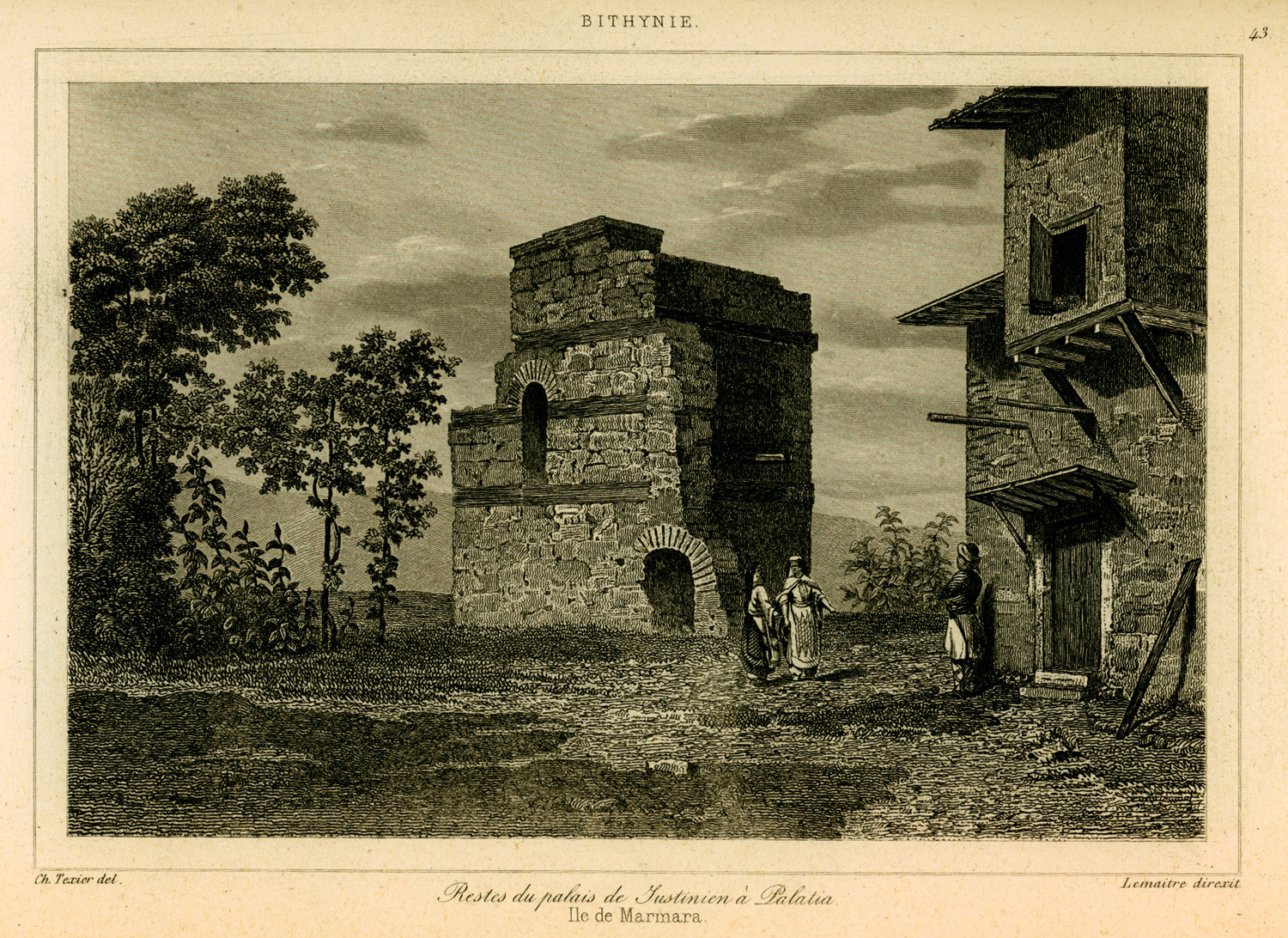
Ruins of the Justinian Palace, Palaces, Marmara Island – Drawn in 1882 by Charles Félix Marie Texier

From the fall of the Byzantine Empire through the beginning of the Ottoman period, the island was almost exclusively populated by Greek Orthodox Christians. The island was a refuge for the runaways of the Devshirme System. For example, in 1567, a group of runaways was protected and hidden by the locals of Marmara Island while the batches of children were being transported from the port of Dutlimanı in Bandırma. Beginning in the 17th century, some Turks and a relatively large number of Jewish people lived on the island; most of these were Sephardi who had left Spain after the Inquisition. During World War I, much of the population was forced off the island onto the mainland, and following the war, as a result of the 1923 Treaty of Lausanne and the population exchange between Greece and Turkey, all remaining Greeks native to the island of Marmara emigrated to Greece and other locations around the globe.

The island's Greek Orthodox diaspora settled primarily in Neos Marmaras in Chalkidiki, the island of Euboea, and in the city of Thessaloniki in northern Greece. In addition, Canada, Australia, and South America were popular destinations for Greek immigration of that time. Many of the former Jewish residents settled in the North American cities of New York, Los Angeles, San Francisco, Portland (Oregon), and the Seattle/Tacoma area.

Many of the current residents of Marmara Adasi are descendants of Turks who fled Greek islands during the population transfers of the 1920s. Initially, immigrants from Crete and families from the Black Sea region were settled in the houses and other properties left by the Greeks on the islands, particularly on Marmara Island. Since the Topağaç Plain, located in the eastern part of Marmara Island, was a malaria hotspot at that time, those who acquired land there were temporarily settled in Asmalı Village to the north. Permanent settlement in Topağaç Village began in 1928 with immigrants from Greece, and in 1930, worker families from Karabiga were also settled in this village.

=== 1935 earthquake ===
On 4 January 1935 at 16:41:29 local time, an earthquake hit the Marmara Island and its neighboring islands Avşa and Paşalimanı, causing five deaths, 30 people injured, and several villages destroyed.

== Geography and climate ==
Marmara Island has an area of 117.18 km^{2}. The island, which roughly resembles an ellipse, has mountainous terrain in its central regions, while its north and south are generally hilly. The hilly area in the north extends in a strip and narrows towards the west. The height of these hills, which expand east of Badalan Bay, reaches 337 m in the east. Karabanlar Hill in the southern part of this hilly area in the northern section of the island reaches 346 m, while the Yavuzaki ridge reaches up to 359 m.

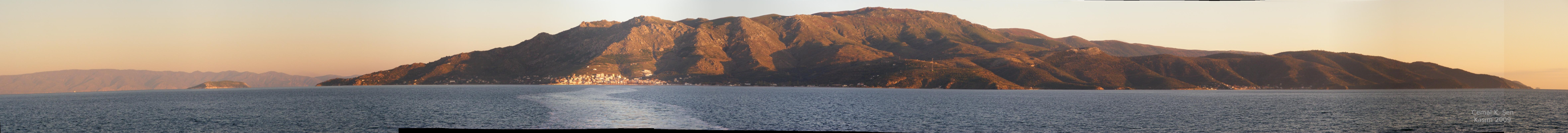
A panorama of Marmara

The mountainous area in the central part rises to 516 m at Keltepe in the west and 598 m at Viranköy Hill in the east. The highest point of the island and the mountainous area is Büyükçayır Peak, which extends up to 699 m in the central-western part of the island. The southern coast of the island has a hilly area similar to that in the north, but with elevations not exceeding 300 m. In the southeast, between the hills, lies the Topağaç Plain, an important agricultural area. The average width of the plain is about 1 km.

Marmara Island, the highest of the Marmara Islands, differs from the other islands in terms of its natural vegetation. While the remaining islands in the archipelago have a steppe appearance, Marmara Island features occasional areas of red pine forests. In the drier southern part, maquis vegetation is common. The northern part, with its forest cover, is richer in terms of plant life. Additionally, Marmara Island is rich in olive trees.

== Administration center and the villages ==
Marmara Island has five villages and one central town. The center is called Marmara and is the administration center of two more islands (Avşa and Ekinlik Islands) nearby. The population was mainly Greek along with some Turkish and Jewish population in Marmara settlement until the population exchange between Greece and Turkey in 1923. Today, the local people are originally from different regions of Turkey and Balkans, mainly from Middle and East of Black Sea Region and Western Thrace of Greece. The permanent population, distances from the center, the current names, and the previous names of the villages are:

- Marmara (Greek; Marmara and Proconnesus): 2183
- Çınarlı (Greek; Galemi): 503, 7 km
- Gündoğdu (Greek; Prastos): 278, 4 km
- Topağaç '

(Greek; Kilazaki): 518, 12 km

- Asmalı (Greek; Aftoni): 237, 18 km
- Saraylar (Greek; Palatia): 2687, 24 km

== Transportation ==
No airport is on Marmara Island, but it can be reached from Tekirdağ, Istanbul, and Erdek district in Balıkesir by sea. Ferries and passenger boats provide basic transportation from Tekirdağ and Erdek, with the journey taking 2 h. Additionally, during summer seasons, IDO operates a sea bus from Istanbul, and the trip takes 2.5 h.

== Notable residents ==
- Aristeas of Proconnesos (7th century BC), a semilegendary Greek poet and miracle worker, was a native of Proconnesus.
- Justinian I (482–565), Roman emperor
- Themistocles (5th century BC), an Athenian politician, after being ostracized from Athens, he sought refuge on Prokennesos.
- Eubulides (4th century BC), a Greek philosopher and mathematician, he was exiled to Prokennesos.
- Saint Timothy (6th century BC), a wonderworker and bishop of Proconnesus, his healing of Emperor Justinian's demon-possessed daughter Arabia led Empress Theodora to build a monastery in gratitude, where his relics and a "sacred" spring were discovered in Topağaç.
- Stephen the Younger (713–764), a Byzantine monk from Constantinople, he became one of the leading opponents of the iconoclastic policies of Emperor Constantine V. He was exiled to Prokennesos.
- Yaşar Kemal (1923–2015), Turkish writer and human rights activist
- Oktay Rıfat (1914–1988), a Turkish writer and playwright, he registered in the island during the census of 1970 to reach the 2,000-inhabitant limit required for Marmara.

== See also ==
- SS Kurtuluş, a cargo ship that sank off the island in 1942 carrying food aid to Greece.
