= Marmara District =

Marmara
- District and municipality
- Map showing Marmara District in Balıkesir Province

- Location in Turkey Marmara (Marmara)
- Coordinates: 40°35′15″N 27°33′19″E
- Country: Turkey
- Province: Balıkesir

Government
  - Mayor: Süleyman Aksoy (AKP)
- Area: 134 km^{2} (52 sq mi)
- Population (2022): 10,601
  - Density: 79.1/km^{2} (205/sq mi)
- Time zone: UTC+3 (TRT)
- Area code: 0266
- Website: www.marmara.bel.tr

Marmara is a municipality and district of Balıkesir Province, Turkey. Its area is 134 km^{2}, and its population is 10,601 (2022). It comprises Marmara, Avşa and Ekinlik islands along with the neighbouring smaller islands. The mayor is Süleyman Aksoy (AKP). The seat of the municipality is in the neighbourhood Cumhuriyet on Marmara Island. The seat of the district governor (kaymakam) is in the neighbourhood Yenimahalle, also on Marmara Island.

== Composition ==
There are 14 neighbourhoods in Marmara District:

- Abroz
- Asmalı
- Avşa
- Çınarlı
- Cumhuriyet
- Deniz
- Ekinlik
- Gündoğdu
- Hürriyet
- Okullar
- Saraylar
- Topağaç
- Yenimahalle
- Yiğitler
