= Avşa =

Island in Turkey

Coordinates: 40°30′43″N 27°29′55″E

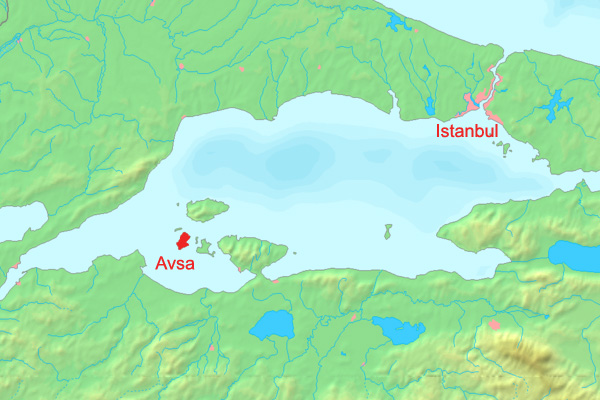
Geographical location of Avşa island.

Avşa Island (Turkish: Avşa Adası) or Türkeli is a Turkish island in the southern Sea of Marmara with an area of about 20.6 square kilometres (8 square miles). It was the classical and Byzantine Aphousia (Greek: Ἀφουσία or Ἀφησιά) and was a place of exile during the Byzantine period. The tomb of St. Macarius of Pelecete was on the island. The Greek inhabitants fled to Sarti Chalkidiki after the 1923 population exchange.

The island belongs to the Marmara District of Balıkesir Province in northwestern Turkey. It is a popular domestic tourist destination, especially for tourists from Istanbul. The local population is around 2,000 according to the last census, but during the summer season the number of visitors increases as far as forty to fifty thousand.

== Transportation ==
The island is within reach from Istanbul by ship and ferry. It is also accessible from Erdek and Tekirdağ by motorboat.

== Location ==
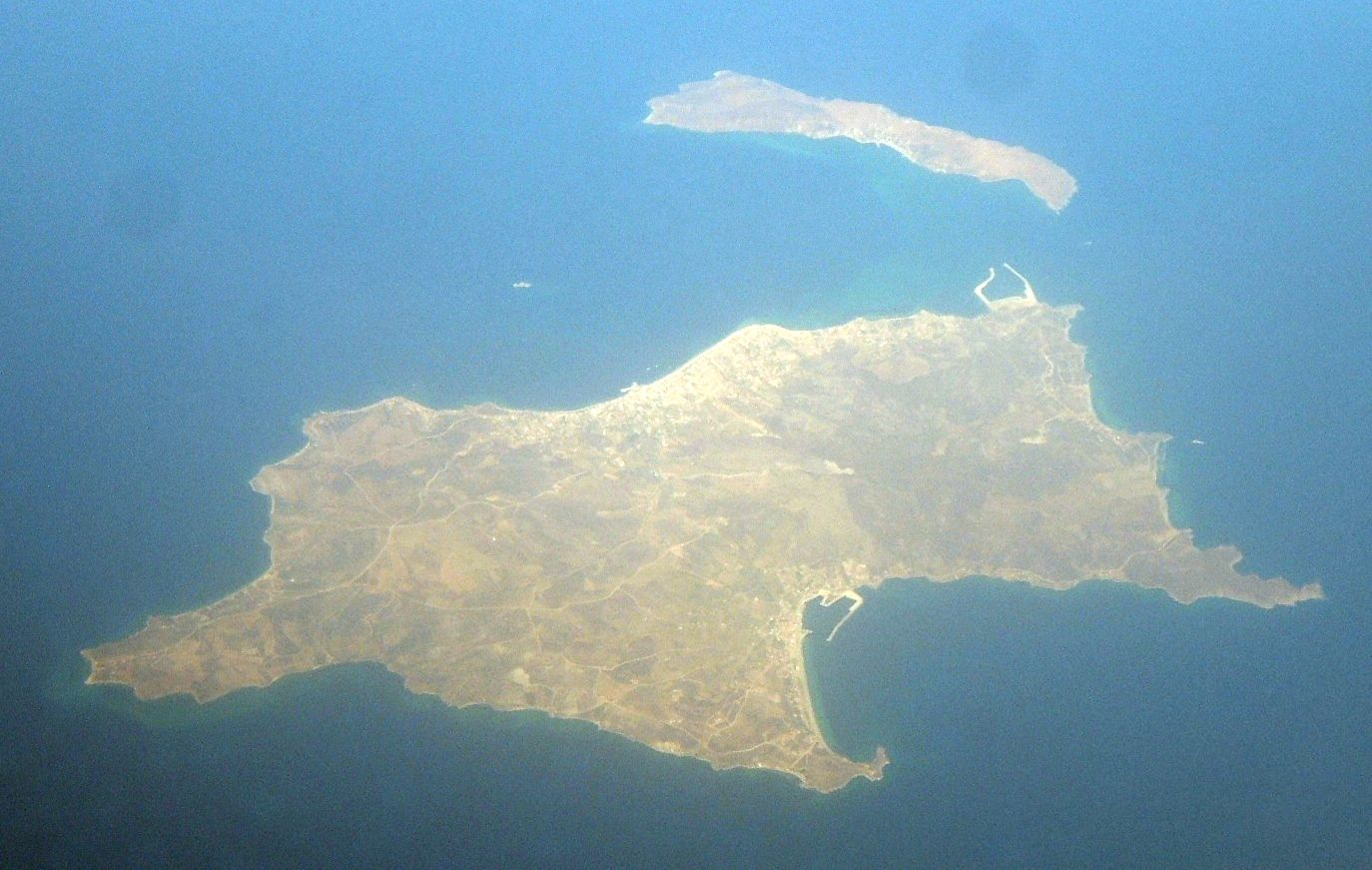
Avşa island aerial view

The exact location of Avşa island is shown in the following map in red color. The larger island north of Avşa is the island of Marmara and the island to the east is Paşalimanı.

== See also ==
- 1935 Erdek–Marmara Islands earthquake
- Balıkesir
- Marmara Island
- Paşalimanı
- Sea of Marmara
