= Sea of Marmara =

Sea between the Black Sea and the Mediterranean Sea

- Marmara Denizi (Turkish)
- The Bosphorus highlighted in red, the Dardanelles strait in yellow.

- Location of the Sea of Marmara within Turkey

- Bathymetry and surrounding relief
- Location: Southern Europe and West Asia
- Coordinates: 40°40′N 28°00′E
- Type: Inland sea
- Primary inflows: Simav River, Biga Çayı, Nilüfer River
- Primary outflows: Turkish Straits
- Catchment area: 11,500 km^{2} (4,400 sq mi)
- Basin countries: Turkey
- Surface area: 11,350 km^{2} (4,380 sq mi)
- Average depth: 494 m (1,621 ft)
- Max. depth: 1,370 m (4,490 ft)
- Water volume: 3,378 km^{3} (810 cu mi)
- Islands: Avşa, Ekinlik, İmralı, Marmara, Paşalimanı, and the Prince Islands
- Settlements: Balıkesir, Bursa, Çanakkale, Istanbul, İzmit, Tekirdağ, and Yalova

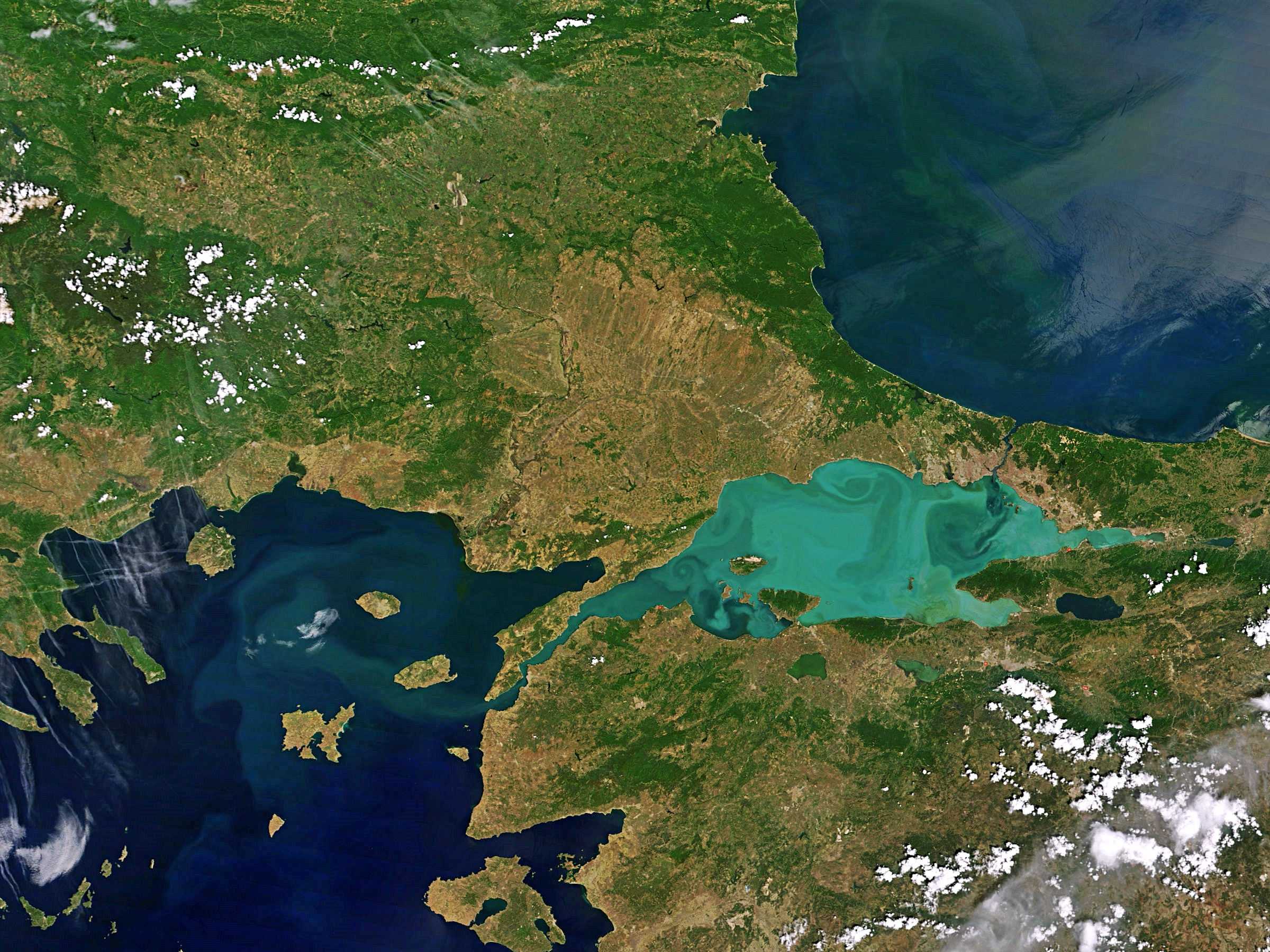
Satellite image of the Sea of Marmara

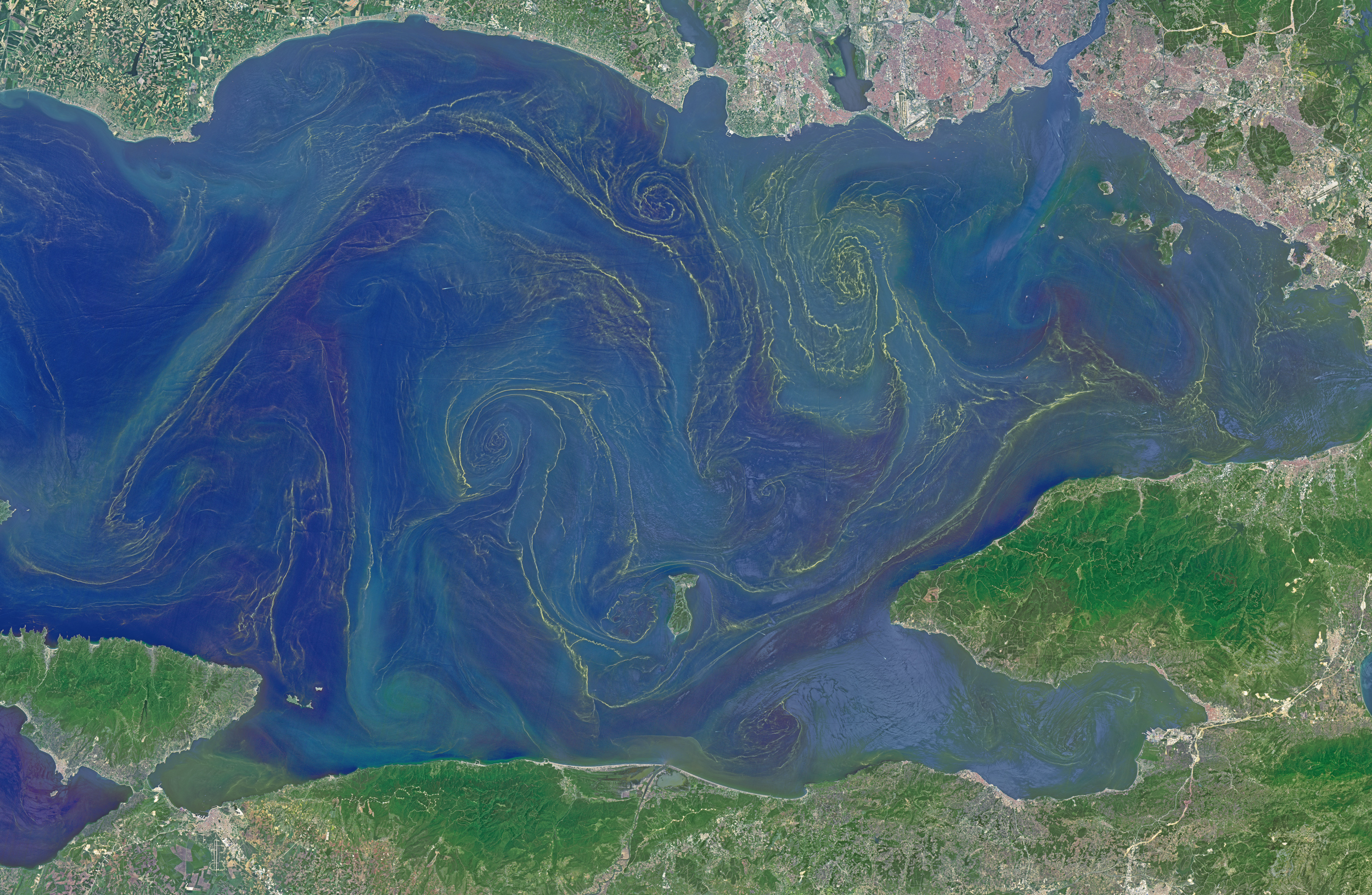
Algal bloom on the Sea of Marmara

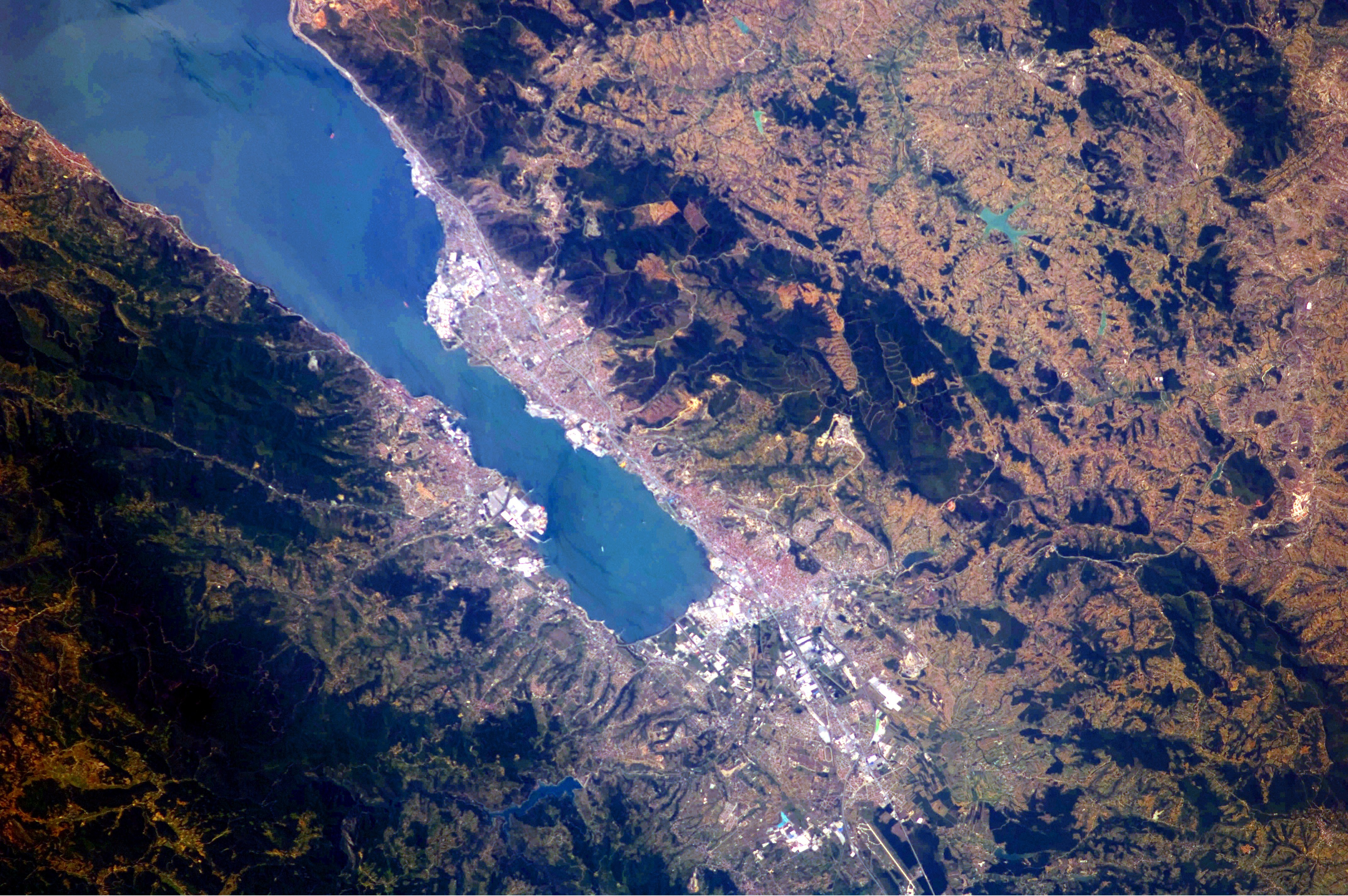
Satellite image showing metropolitan İzmit along northern and eastern shores

The Sea of Marmara, (Note: /ˈmɑːrmərə/; Turkish: Marmara Denizi; Ancient Greek: Προποντίς, Προποντίδα, romanized: Propontís, Propontída) also known as the Sea of Marmora, the Marmara Sea, or Propontis (/prəˈpɒntɪs/; ancient Greek: Προποντίς /pro.ponˈdis/), is a small inland sea entirely within the borders of Turkey. It links the Black Sea and the Aegean Sea via the Bosporus and Dardanelles straits, separating Turkey's European and Asian sides. It has an area of 11,350 km^{2} (4,380 sq mi), and its dimensions are roughly 280 km × 80 km (174 mi × 50 mi), considered as the smallest sea in the world. Its greatest depth is 1,370 m (4,490 ft).

== Name ==
The Sea of Marmara is named after the largest island on its south side, called Marmara Island because it is rich in marble (Greek μάρμᾰρον, mármaron "marble").

In classical antiquity, it was known as the Propontis, from the Greek pro "in front of" + pontos "sea", specifically the Black Sea, since the Ancient Greeks sailed through it to reach the Black Sea.

== Mythology ==
In Greek mythology, a storm on the Propontis brought the Argonauts back to an island they had left, precipitating a battle in which either Jason or Heracles killed King Cyzicus, who had mistaken them for his Pelasgian enemies.

== Geography and hydrology ==
The International Hydrographic Organization defines the limits of the Sea of Marmara as:

On the West. The Dardanelles limit of the Aegean Sea [A line joining Kum Kale (26°11'E) and Cape Helles].

On the Northeast. A line joining Cape Rumili with Cape Anatoli (41°13′N). The sea's south coast is heavily indented and includes the Gulf of İzmit (Turkish: İzmit Körfezi), the Gulf of Gemlik (Turkish: Gemlik Körfezi), the Gulf of Bandırma (Turkish: Bandırma Körfezi), and the Gulf of Erdek (Turkish: Erdek Körfezi).

The surface salinity of the Marmara averages about 22 parts per thousand, which is slightly more than that of the Black Sea, but only about two-thirds that of most oceans. The water is much more saline at the bottom of the sea, averaging a salinity around 38 parts per thousand, similar to that of the Mediterranean Sea. This high-density saline water does not migrate to the surface, as is also the case with the Black Sea. Water from the Susurluk, Biga (Granicus), and Gönen Rivers also reduces the salinity of the sea, though with less effect than on the Black Sea. With little land in Thrace draining southward, almost all of these rivers flow from Anatolia.

=== Islands ===
Two main groups of islands are in the Sea of Marmara. To the north lie the Princes' Islands, an archipelago made up of the inhabited islands of Kınaliada, Burgazada, Heybeliada, Büyükada, and Sedef Adası, and several uninhabited islands, including Sivriada, Yassıada, Kaşıkadası and Tavşanadası. The inhabited islands are readily accessible by ferry from both the European and Asian shores of İstanbul, and the entire archipelago forms part of the conurbation.

To the south lie the Marmara Islands, an archipelago made up of the eponymous Marmara Island and three other inhabited islands – Avşa, Paşalimanı, and Ekinlik, as well as 17 largely uninhabited islands, including the prison island of Imralı, whose most famous prisoner, since 1999, has been the PKK leader Abdullah Öcalan. These islands lie within Balıkesir Province and are most readily accessible from Tekirdağ in Thrace or Erdek on the southern shore of the Sea of Marmara. In high summer, additional ferries travel to Avşa and Marmara Islands from the centre of İstanbul to facilitate a growing tourist trade.

Also, a few individual islands are elsewhere in the Sea of Marmara, such as Koç Adası, off Tuzla, which is privately owned by the Koç family of industrialists.

== Environmental challenges ==
The North Anatolian Fault runs under the sea and has triggered several major earthquakes, such as the Izmit and Düzce in August and November 1999, respectively. The August 1999 earthquake is commonly referred to as the Marmara Earthquake, since its epicentre lay under the sea and most of the places worst affected by the quake and ensuing tsunami lay along its shores.

In a storm on 29 December 1999, the Russian oil tanker Volgoneft-248 broke in two in the Sea of Marmara, spilling more than 1,500 tonnes of oil into the water.

The main cities in Turkey, especially Istanbul, the largest city, are around the Marmara Sea, a small inland sea. Despite its limited size, the basin is home to about one-third of the country's population. Rapid population growth and uncontrolled construction in this area have put heavy pressure on the sea. For many years, waste was dumped into the Marmara Sea with little or no treatment, surpassing the sea's ability to handle it. As a result, many species in the sea have disappeared, and fishing was banned in the "East Bay" of the Marmara Sea for years due to severe pollution. One of the most serious environmental problems in the Marmara Sea in recent years has been mucilage, a thick, sticky substance that appears for up to six months. The mucilage outbreak began in January and lasted until June in 2021. It caused habitat loss and economic issues, and disrupted vital ecosystem services, such as fishing.

== Towns and cities ==
Towns and cities on the coast of the Sea of Marmara include:

Istanbul Province

Istanbul

Adalar
Bakırköy
Bostancı
Kadıköy
Kartal
Fatih
Maltepe
Pendik
Üsküdar
Yeşilköy
Zeytinburnu

Büyükçekmece

Kumburgaz

Silivri
Tuzla

Balıkesir Province

Bandırma
Erdek
Gönen
Marmara

Bursa Province

Gemlik
Karacabey
Mudanya

Çanakkale Province

Biga
Gelibolu
Lapseki

Kocaeli Province

Derince
Eskihisar
Gebze
Gölcük
Hereke
İzmit (Pr. Cap)
Karamürsel
Körfez

Tekirdağ Province

Marmara Ereğli
Şarköy
Tekirdağ (Pr. Cap)

Yalova Province

Altınova
Armutlu
Çiftlikköy
Çınarcık
Termal
Yalova (Pr. Cap)

== Gallery ==
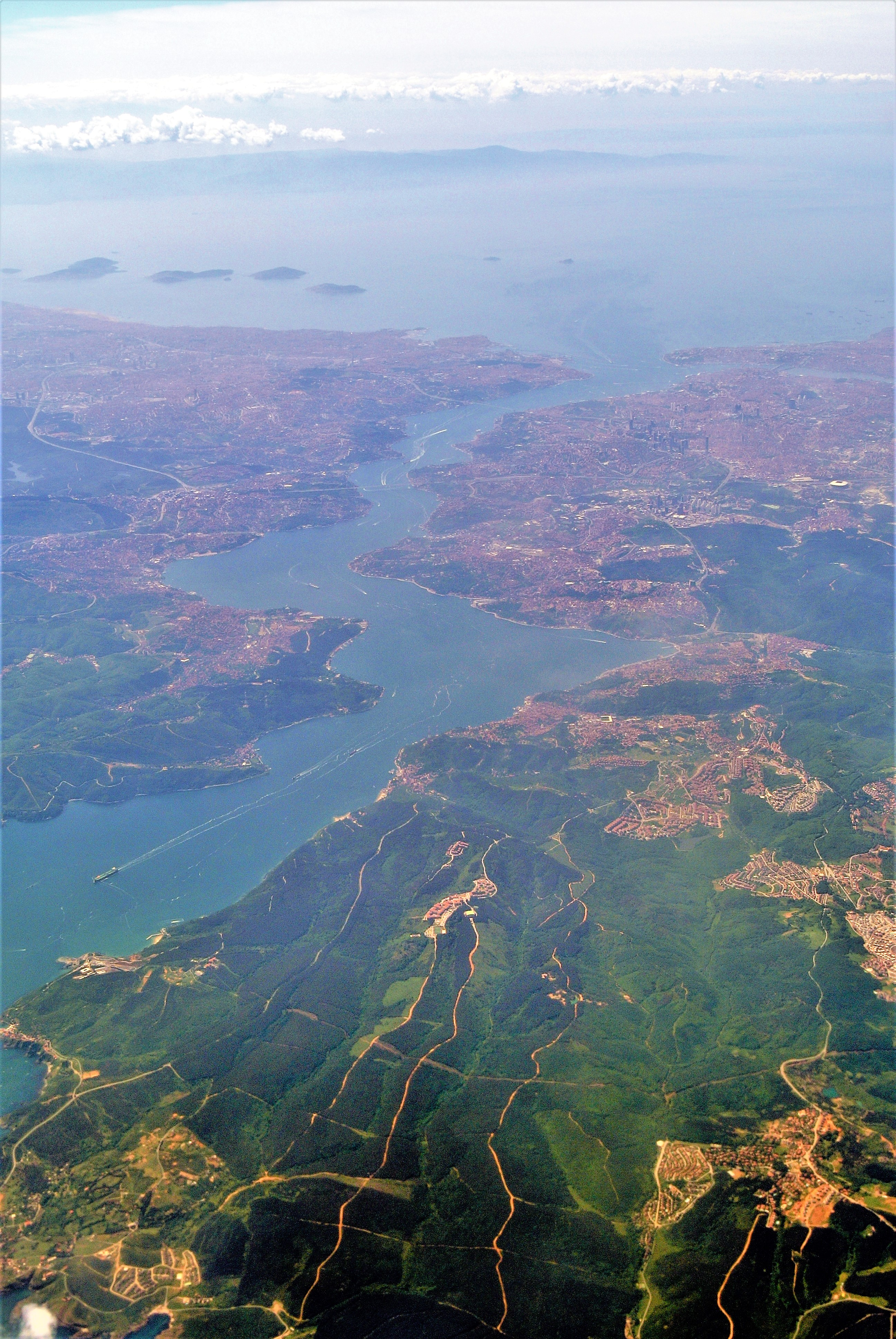
The Bosporus with Istanbul in the background

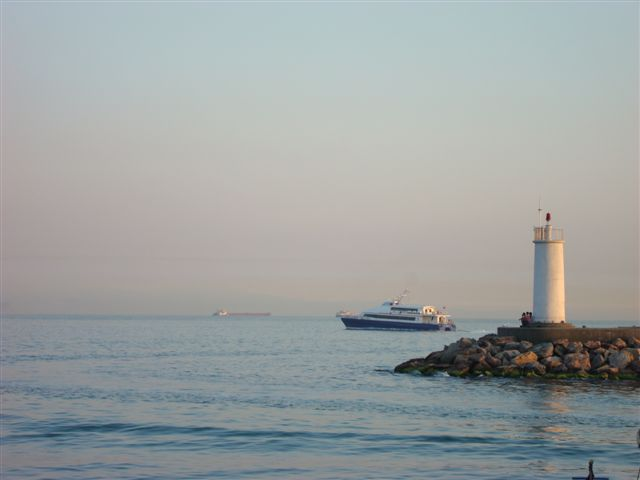
View of Marmara Sea from Istanbul

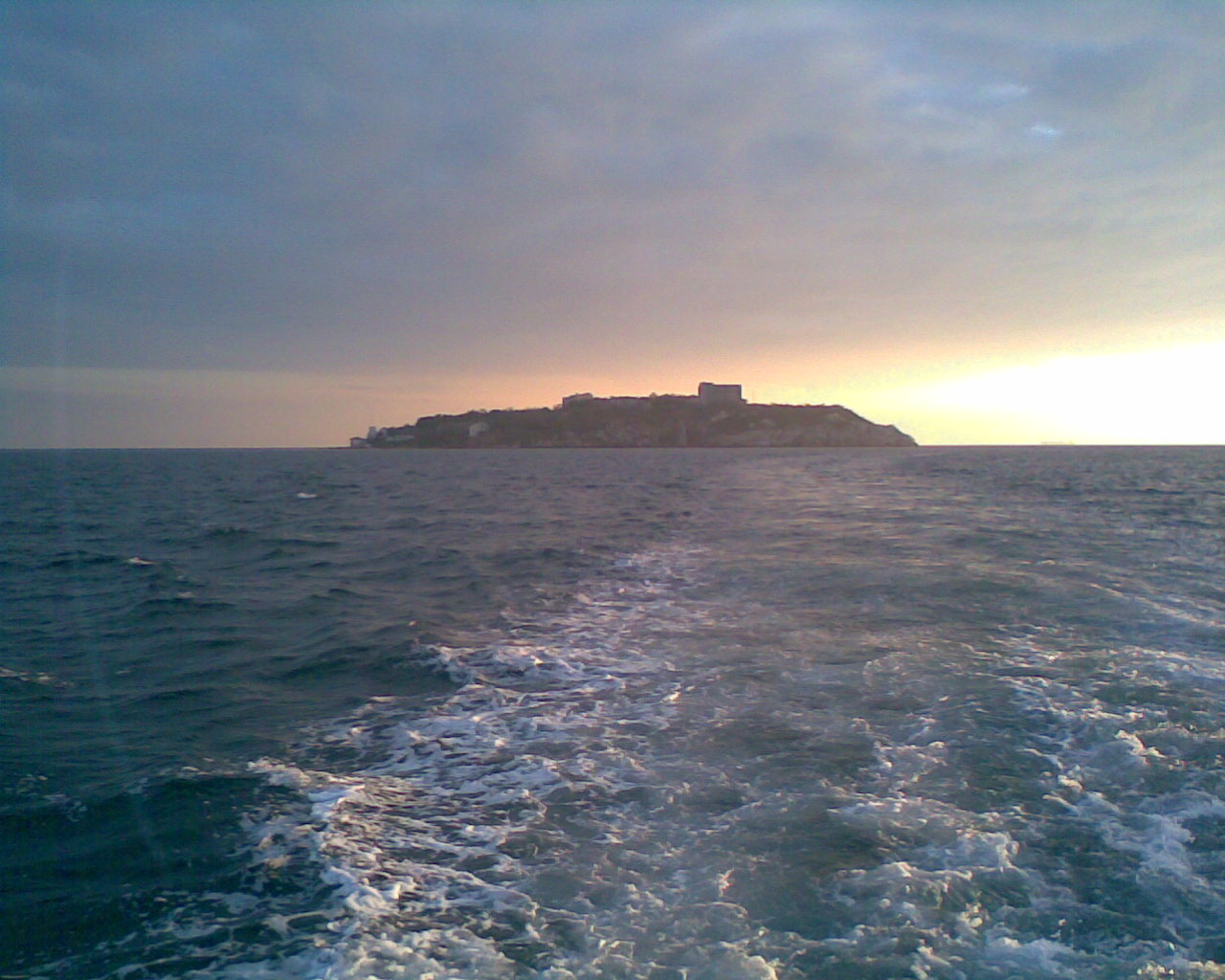
Sea of Marmara approaching Yassıada

== See also ==
- 1509 Constantinople earthquake
- 1766 Istanbul earthquake
- 1999 İzmit earthquake
- Black Sea deluge hypothesis
- Kanal İstanbul
- Montreux Convention Regarding the Regime of the Straits
- Turkish Straits
