= List of European islands by population =

This is a list of islands in Europe ordered by population. Ten islands on the list are not geographically in Europe, but listed since they politically belong. The list is not complete.

== European islands ==
Ranking	Island	Countries	Population
1	Great Britain	United Kingdom	66,397,821
2	Ireland	Republic of Ireland; United Kingdom (Northern Ireland)	7,026,636
3	Sicily	Italy	4,789,826
4	Zealand	Denmark	2,409,950 (2025)
5	Sardinia	Italy	1,670,219
6	Cyprus (Asia)	Republic of Cyprus; United Kingdom (Akrotiri and Dhekelia); Northern Cyprus	1,278,686 (2021)
7	Tenerife (Africa)	Spain	966,354 (2020)
8	Mallorca	Spain	896,038 (2019)
9	Gran Canaria (Africa)	Spain	870,595 (2020)
10	Södertörn (Note: Defined as an island in 2014 by Statistics Sweden)	Sweden	797,333 (2013)
11	Crete	Greece	634,930 (2019)
12	Funen	Denmark	478,986 (2025)
13	Sakhalin (Asia)	Russia	471,515 (2014)
14	IJsselmonde	Netherlands	423,000
15	Malta	Malta	552,056 (2026)
16	Iceland	Iceland	385,230 (2022)
17	Flevopolder	Netherlands	317,000
18	Corsica	France	349,465 (2022)
19	North Jutlandic Island (Note: Was not an island until a storm in 1825 caused a connection between the North Sea and Limfjord.)	Denmark	295,375 (2025)
20	Madeira (Africa)	Portugal	251,060 (2021)
21	Žitný ostrov	Slovakia	226,446 (2001)
22	Amager	Denmark	225,746 (2025)
23	Vasilyevsky Island	Russia	209,188 (2017)
24	Portsea Island	United Kingdom	207,100 (2010)
25	Euboea	Greece	191,206 (2011)
26	Csepel Island	Hungary	166,953 (2012)
27	Voorne-Putten	Netherlands	156,133 (2020)
28	Lanzarote (Africa)	Spain	154,530 (2020)
29	Hisingen	Sweden	165,000 (2021)
30	Ibiza	Spain	147,914 (2019)
31	Isle of Wight	United Kingdom	140,000
32	São Miguel Island	Portugal (Azores)	133,295 (2021)
33	Eiland van Dordrecht	Netherlands	118,871 (2006)
34	Rhodes	Greece	115,490 (2011)
35	Lesbos Island	Greece	114,880 (2020)
36	Fuerteventura (Africa)	Spain	126,227 (2020)
37	Södermalm	Sweden	102,756 (2013)
38	Corfu	Greece	102,071 (2011)
39	Menorca	Spain	92,348 (2015)
40	Jersey	Jersey (crown dependency of United Kingdom)	88,200
41	Hoeksche Waard	Netherlands	88,000
42	La Palma (Africa)	Spain	82,346 (2015)
43	Isle of Man	Isle of Man (crown dependency of United Kingdom)	80,000
44	Usedom	Germany, Poland	76,500
45	Rügen	Germany	73,000
46	Anglesey/Ynys Môn	United Kingdom	68,900
47	Guernsey	Guernsey (part of a crown dependency of United Kingdom)	62,200
48	Venice (Note: Many small islands connected by bridges)	Italy	62,000
49	Kungsholmen	Sweden	58,194 (2013)
50	Värmdö	Sweden	57,497 (2013)
51	Gotland	Sweden	56,656 (2013)
52	Lolland	Denmark	56,392 (2025)
53	Ischia	Italy	56,100
54	Terceira Island	Portugal (Azores)	55,833 (2001)
55	Chios	Greece	54,030 (2020)
56	Chioggia	Italy	51,336
57	Goeree-Overflakkee	Netherlands	51,054
58	Als	Denmark	49,373 (2025)
59	Lidingö	Sweden	43,897 (2013)
60	Kotlin Island	Russia	43,100
61	Falster	Denmark	41,481 (2025)
62	Zakynthos	Greece	40,759 (2011)
63	Salamis Island	Greece	39,283 (2011)
64	Saaremaa	Estonia	39,200
65	Bornholm	Denmark	38,966 (2025)
66	Isle of Sheppey	United Kingdom	37,852
67	Canvey Island	United Kingdom	37,473
68	Cephalonia	Greece	35,801 (2011)
69	Tromsøya	Norway	35,000 (2007)
70	Schouwen-Duiveland	Netherlands	34,158 (2022)
71	Kos	Greece	33,387 (2011)
72	Samos	Greece	32,977 (2011)
73	Hinnøya	Norway	32,101
73	Elba	Italy	32,000
74	Gozo	Malta	31,100
75	Karmøy	Norway	29,940
76	Öland	Sweden	24,984 (2013)
77	Askøy	Norway	24,000 (2009)
78	Fasta Åland	Finland	23,600
79	Lauttasaari (Drumsö)	Finland	23,226
80	Lefkada	Greece	22,652 (2011)
81	Streymoy	Denmark (Faroe Islands)	22,555 (2009)
82	Port Island (Gdańsk)	Poland	22,167
83	Syros	Greece	21,507 (2011)
84	Sylt	Germany	21,000
85	La Gomera (Africa)	Spain	20,783 (2015)
86	Oléron	France	20,000
87	Lido di Venezia	Italy	20,000
88	Lewis and Harris (Note: The Isle of Lewis and Isle of Harris together form a single island, but by tradition and usage they are often treated as two separate islands.)	United Kingdom	19,918
89	Mors	Denmark	19,486 (2025)
90	Stord	Norway	19,400
91	Naxos	Greece	18,904 (2011)
92	Nøtterøy	Norway	18,500
93	Wolin	Poland	18,000
94	Krk	Croatia	17,860
95	Shetland Mainland	United Kingdom	17,550
96	Lemnos	Greece	16,992 (2011)
97	Hayling Island	United Kingdom	16,887
98	Korčula	Croatia	16,182
99	Kalymnos	Greece	16,179 (2011)
100	Langøya	Norway	15,844
101	Santorini	Greece	15,550 (2011)
102	Ekerö	Sweden	15,369 (2013)
103	Sotra (Store Sotra)	Norway	15,356
104	Orkney Mainland	United Kingdom	15,315
105	Faial Island	Portugal (Azores)	15,063 (2001)
106	Île de Ré	France	15,000
107	Pico Island	Portugal (Azores)	14,806 (2001)
108	Hammarö	Sweden	14,709 (2013)
109	Orust	Sweden	14,562 (2013)
110	Brač	Croatia	14,031
111	Tjörn	Sweden	14,024
112	Thasos	Greece	13,770 (2011)
113	Paros	Greece	13,715 (2011)
114	Texel	Netherlands	13,700
115	Holy Island, Anglesey	United Kingdom	13,600
116	Aegina	Greece	13,056 (2011)
117	Fehmarn	Germany	13,000
118	Great Island	Ireland	13,000
119	Capri	Italy	12,200
120	Formentera	Spain	11,878 (2015)
121	Jeløya	Norway	11,825 (2017)
122	Langeland	Denmark	11,732 (2025)
123	Sant'Antioco	Italy	11,700
124	Walney Island	United Kingdom	11,391
125	Gökçeada	Turkey	11,331 (2025)
126	Hvar	Croatia	11,103
127	Hiiumaa	Estonia	11,087
128	Lipari	Italy	11,000
129	Eysturoy	Denmark (Faroe Islands)	10,883 (2009)
130	Vestvågøya	Norway	10,700
131	Procida	Italy	10,694 (2004)
132	El Hierro (Africa)	Spain	10,587 (2015)
133	Frösö	Sweden	10,570 (2013)
134	São Jorge Island	Portugal (Azores)	10,500 (2001)
135	Kvaløya (Troms)	Norway	10,300
136	Mykonos	Greece	10,134 (2011)
137	Île de Noirmoutier	France	10,000
138	Møn	Denmark	8,925 (2025)
139	Büyükada (Princes' Islands)	Turkey	8,903 (2025)
140	Marmara Island	Turkey	7,369 (2025)
141	Heybeliada (Princes' Islands)	Turkey	4,469 (2025)
142	Avşa	Turkey	4,189 (2025)
143	Cunda/Alibey	Turkey	3,461~ (2025)
144	Bozcaada	Turkey	3,384 (2025)
145	Kınalıada (Princes' Islands)	Turkey	1,987 (2025)
146	Burgazada (Princes' Islands)	Turkey	1,620 (2025)
147	Paşalimanı	Turkey	1,119 (2025)
148	Ekinlik Island	Turkey	150~ (2025)
149	Serpent Island	Ukraine	100~
150	Şövalye Island (Knight Island)	Turkey	40~ (2025)
151	Sedef Island (Princes' Islands)	Turkey	15~ (2025)

== See also ==
- List of European islands by area
- List of islands by population

== Notes ==
- Population figures for Alderney, Sark and Herm have been deducted from the total population of the Bailiwick of Guernsey. These three are parts of the Bailiwick, but are separate islands.
- It could be argued that some islands of Saint Petersburg, most notably Vasilievsky Island and Kamenny Island, should be added. But it is hard to find any statistics on them which is not in Russian.
- It is hard to find statistics on Île de la Cité and Île Saint-Louis, the two islands in the Seine in Paris, or to decide whether they belong to the list.
- Population figures of some small islands of Iceland (e.g. Heimaey) have been deducted from the population of the republic of Iceland.
- Madeira Island of Portugal is not included, as it is not a European island.
- Canary Islands of Spain are likewise not included, as they are not European islands either.
- To be precise, Venice and Chioggia (two distinct cities, the first one at the centre, the second one at the southern end of the Venice Lagoon) are not two islands themselves, but two groups of larger and smaller lagoon islands, very near one to another but separated by larger and smaller lagoon channels. Just as for Paris and Saint Petersburg, it would be difficult to find statistics about the population of every single island.
- The status of Södertörn and Södermalm as islands has been disputed in earlier Wikipedia articles; the publication of includes a changed definition of an "island" to be used - which clarifies the question, at least in official Swedish statistics.
- Population figures (as of 31 December 2013) of Swedish islands except Södermalm and Kungsholmen as published by.
- Population figures for the Swedish island Södermalm do not include the population of the nearby smaller islands of Reimersholme and Långholmen, neither is the population of Hammarby Sjöstad.
- Population figures (as of 31 December 2013) of Swedish islands Södermalm and Kungsholmen are calculated from.
- The population shown for Lipari is for the main island; there are a few other inhabited islands in the archipelago.

Footnotes
