= Streptomyces burgazadensis =

Scientific classification
- Domain: Bacteria
- Kingdom: Bacillati
- Phylum: Actinomycetota
- Class: Actinomycetia
- Order: Streptomycetales
- Family: Streptomycetaceae
- Genus: Streptomyces
- Species: S. burgazadensis

Binomial name
- Streptomyces burgazadensis Saricaoglu et al. 2014

Type strain
- Z1R7

Species of bacterium

Streptomyces burgazadensis is a bacterium species from the genus of Streptomyces which has been isolated from soil from the Marmara Sea in Burgazada in Istanbul in Turkey.

== See also ==
- List of Streptomyces species
