= Kaşık Island =

Island in Turkey

Coordinates: 40°53′03″N 29°04′38″E

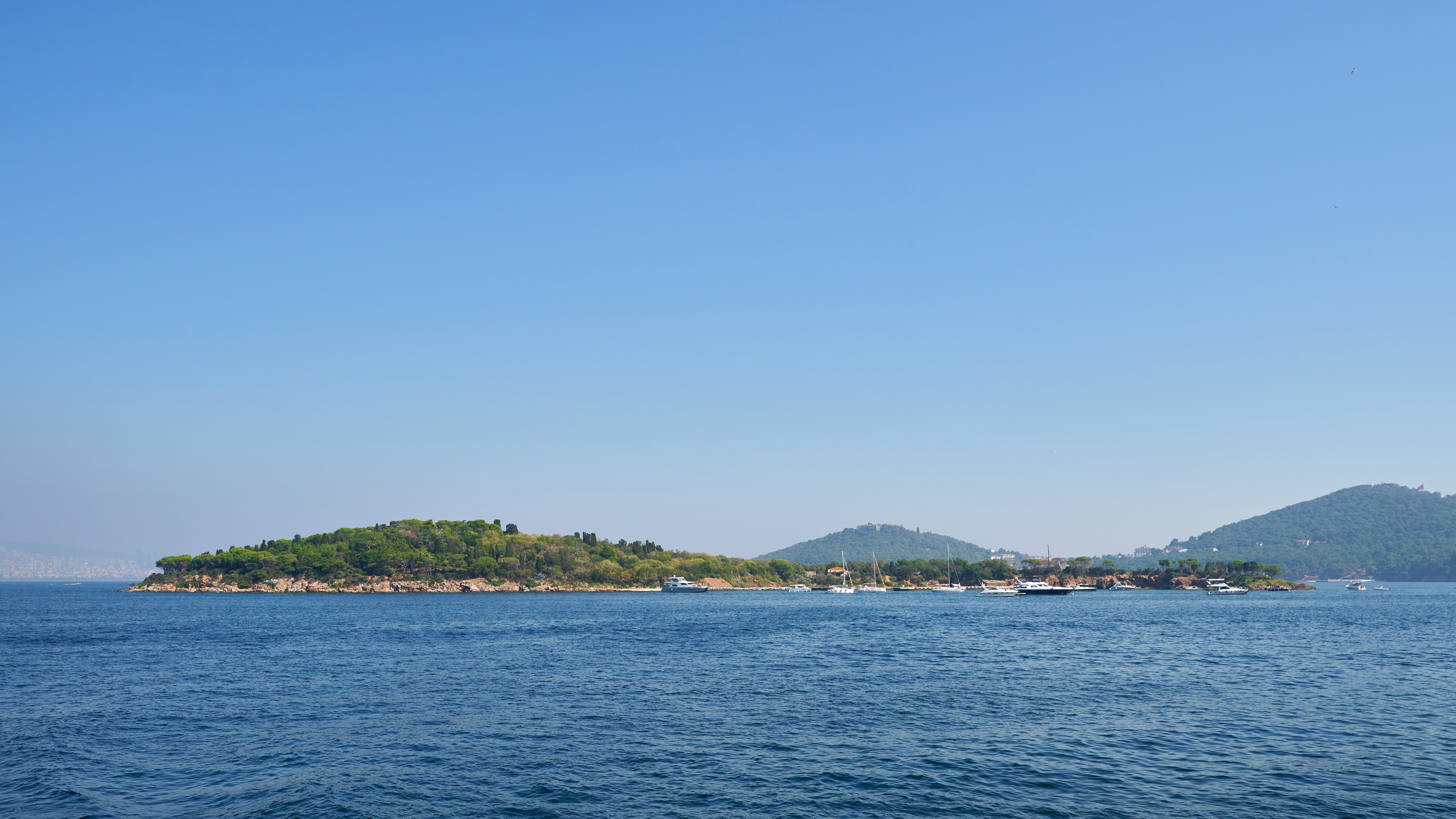
Kaşık Adası viewed from Burgazada.

Kaşık Island, (Turkish: Kaşık Adası, literally "Spoon Island"; Greek: Πίτα) is one of the nine islands comprising the Princes' Islands in the Sea of Marmara, near Istanbul. It is located between the islands of Burgazada and Heybeliada. Kaşık Adası is officially administered by Burgazada neighborhood in the Adalar district of Istanbul, Turkey.

== See also ==
- List of islands of Turkey
