= Kınalıada =

Island in Turkey

Kınalıada Πρώτη (Greek)
- Neighbourhood
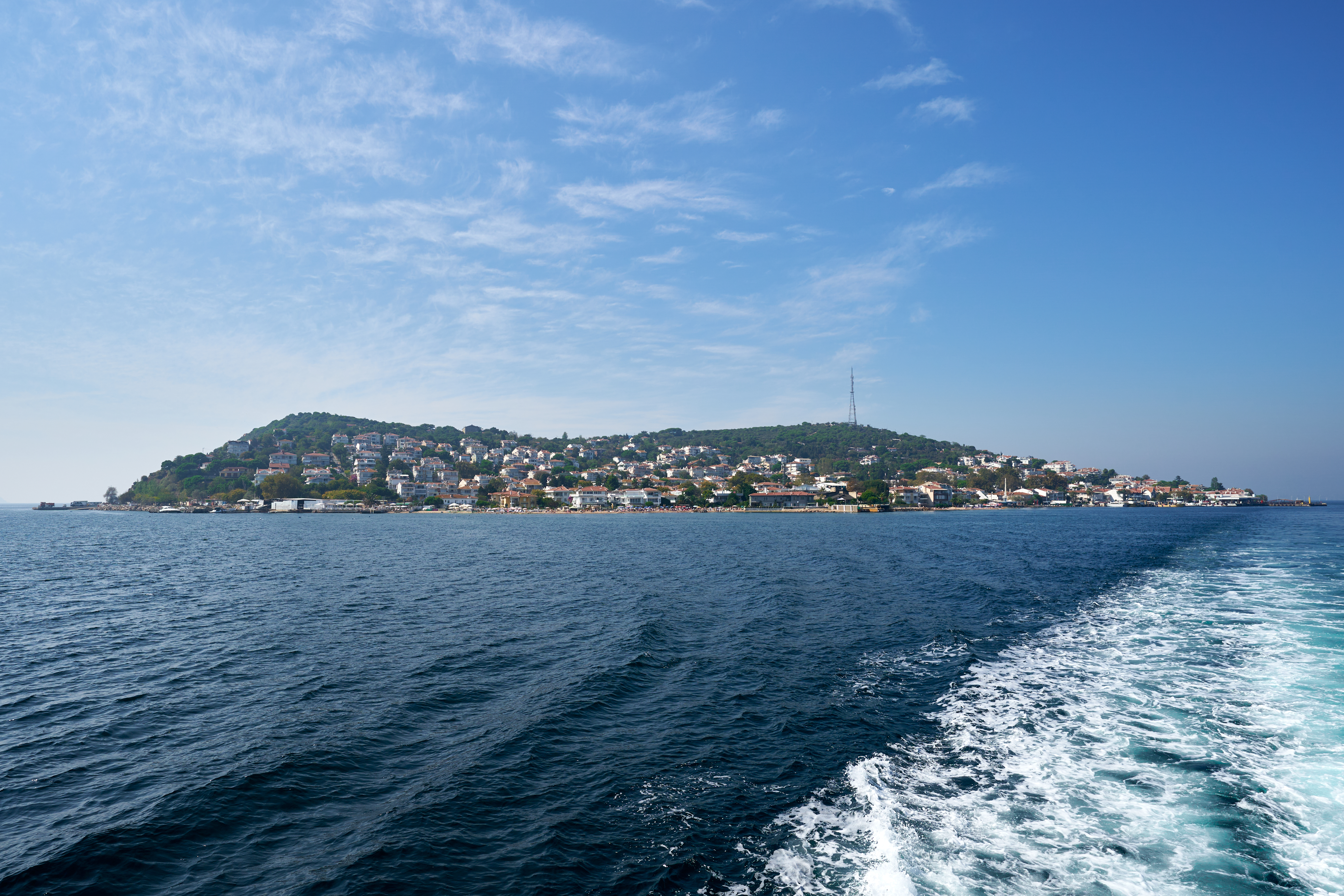
- Distant view of Kınalıada from south-east

- Location within Turkey Location within Istanbul
- Coordinates: 40°54′47″N 29°03′00″E
- Country: Turkey
- Province: Istanbul
- District: Adalar
- Population (2022): 2,025
- Time zone: UTC+3 (TRT)

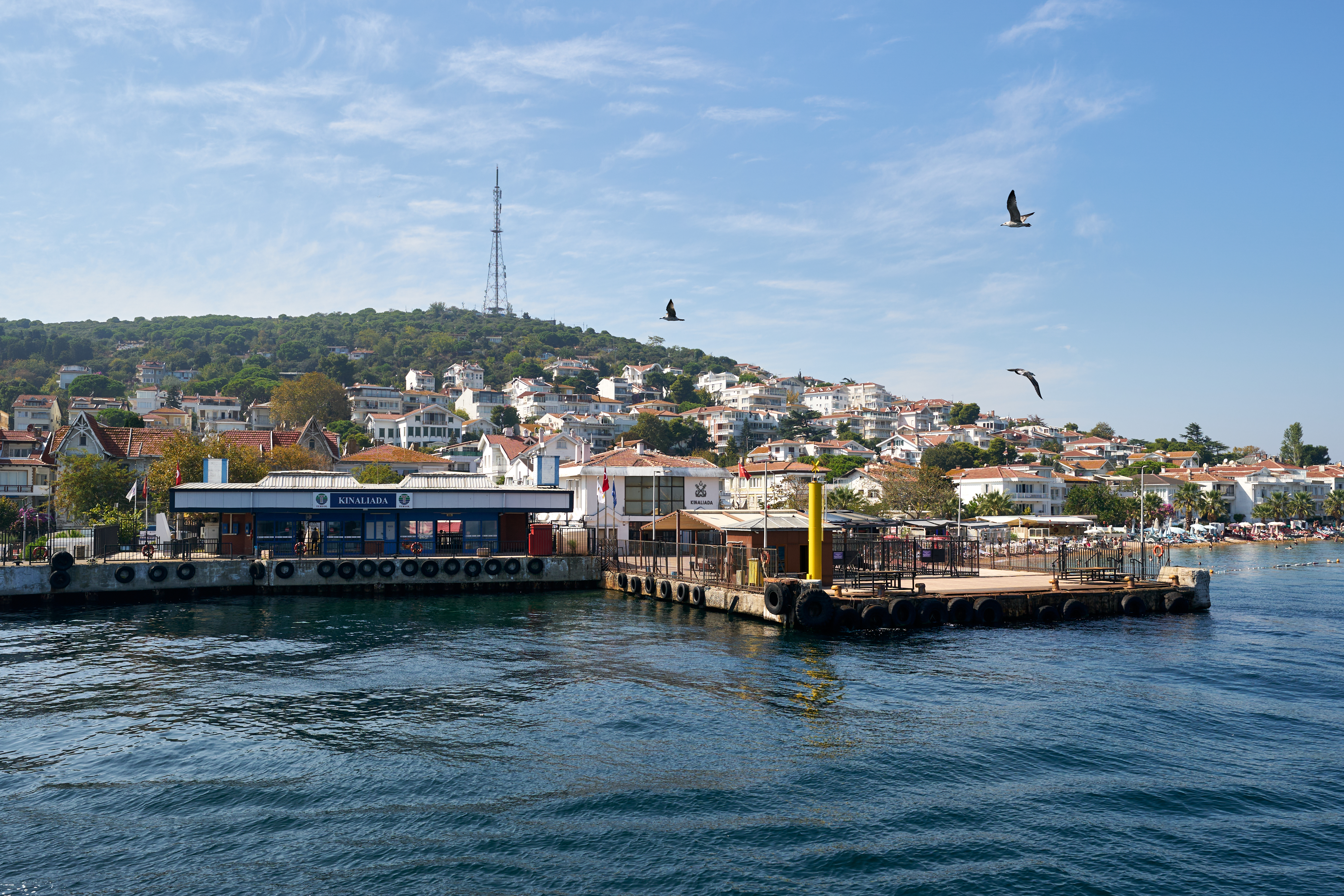
Harbor of Kınalıada

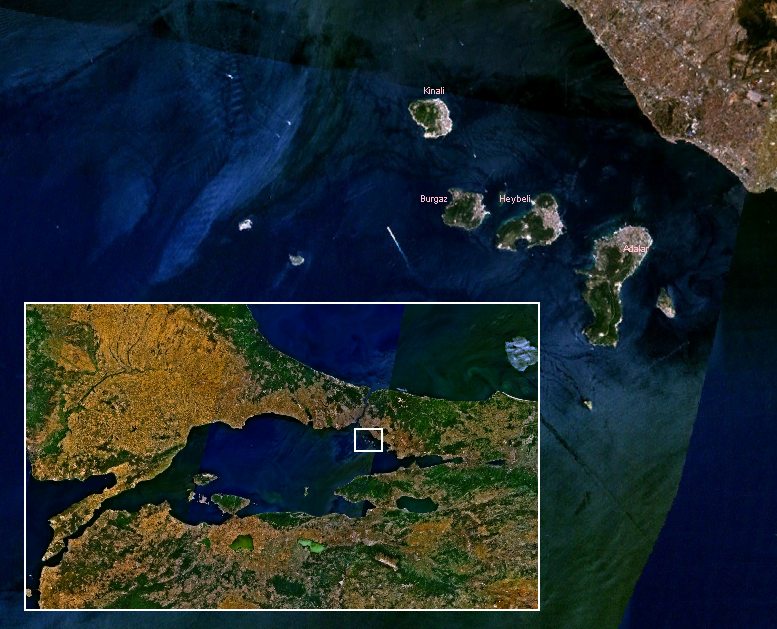
Satellite photo of the Princes' Islands (Kınalıada is the first one at top left)

Kınalıada (Turkish for: Henna Island; Greek: Πρώτη, romanized: Proti, lit. 'first', known classically in English as Prote) is the fourth largest inhabited island in the Princes' Islands in the Sea of Marmara; near Istanbul, Turkey. It is also the closest of the islands to the mainland, lying about 12 kilometres (7 mi) to the south. Administratively, it is a neighbourhood in the municipality and district of Adalar, Istanbul Province, Turkey. Its population is 2,025 (2022). In the past it was called Proti by its Greek residents.

Kınalıada means "Henna Island" in Turkish, because the land has a reddish colour as a result of the iron and copper that has been mined there. It is dominated by Çınar Tepesi (Plane Tree Hill, 115 m/377 ft), Teşrifiye Tepesi (Visiting Hill, 110 m/360 ft) and Manastır Tepesi (Monastery Hill, 93 m/305 ft). This is one of the least forested of the Prince Islands.

Proti (Greek: First) was the island most commonly used as a place of exile under the Byzantine Empire. The most notable exile was Emperor Romanos IV Diogenes, who remained in the Monastery of the Transfiguration on Hristo Peak of the island after the Battle of Manzikert in 1071. The island was also the burial place of the deposed Emperor Tiberius III.

The island is home to one former Greek Orthodox monastery, the Monastery of Christ.

The waterfront Kınalıada Mosque is a rare example of modern architecture in the islands. It was designed in 1964 by Başar Acarlı and Turhan Ayuroğlu to evoke the shape of a yacht.

Şehir Hatları ferries connect the island with the mainland from terminals at Eminönü and Kabataş on the European side of Istanbul and from Kadıköy and Bostancı on the Asian side. As it is the closest of the Princes' Islands to the ferry terminals of mainland Istanbul, most of the ferries call first at Kınalıada before continuing to Burgazada, Heybeliada and Büyükada.

== Notable residents ==
- Empress Irene (c. 752–803), Byzantine empress
- Michael I Rangabe (c. 770–844), Byzantine emperor
- Romanos I Lekapenos (870–948), Byzantine emperor
- Romanos IV Diogenes (c. 1030–1072), Exiled Byzantine emperor
- Zabel Sibil Asadour (1863–1934), Armenian poet and writer
- Eşfak Aykaç (1918–2003), Turkish football player and coach
- Zahrad (1924–2007), Armenian poet
- Mesrob II Mutafyan (1956–2019), Armenian Patriarch

== See also ==
- List of Armenian ethnic enclaves
