= Sivriada =

Island in Turkey

Coordinates: 40°53′N 28°58′E

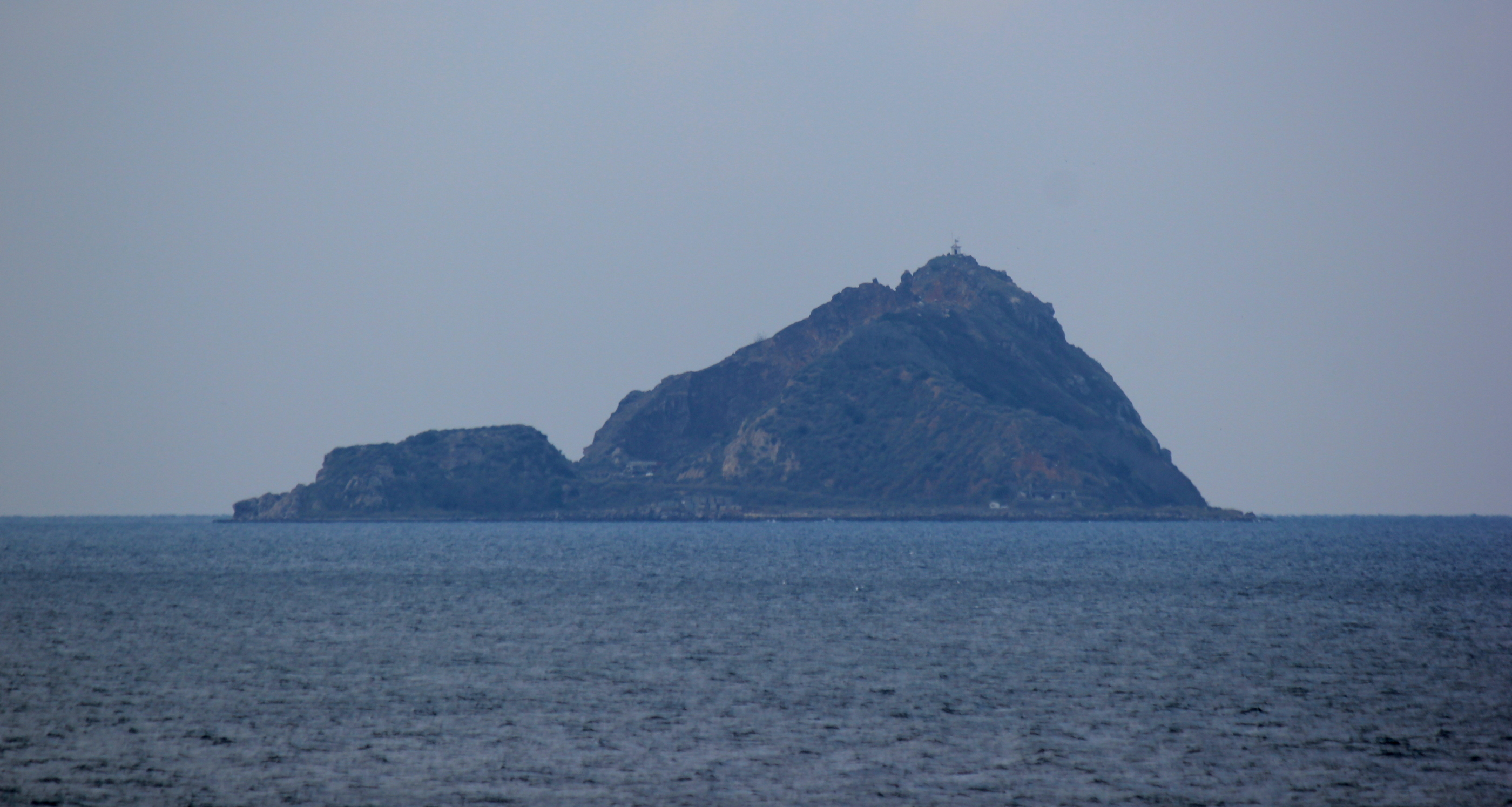
Sivriada as seen from the east

Sivriada (Greek: Ὀξεία, Oxeia) also known as Hayırsızada, is one of the Princes' Islands in the Sea of Marmara, near Istanbul.

The island, which has an area of 0.05 km², is officially a neighbourhood in the Adalar district of Istanbul, Turkey.

== History ==
Sivriada was often used by the Byzantine clerics as a distant place for peaceful worship, and by the Byzantine emperors as a convenient prison to detain prominent people whom they deemed troublesome. The first famous person to be imprisoned in the island by the order of emperor Nikephoros I was Plato of Sakkoudion, the uncle of renowned cleric Theodoros Stoudites, for supporting his nephew in his conflict with the emperor. Other famous people who stayed in the island for religious and political reasons were Gebon, Basil Skleros, Nikephoritzes (the chief minister of Michael VII Doukas), Patriarch John of Antioch and Patriarch Michael II of Constantinople. The graves of those who died on the island during the Byzantine period can still be seen today.

The ruins of a Roman settlement and a 9th-century Byzantine monastery can still be seen on the shore, close to the fishermen's shelter, a small wharf which is often used by yachts. The most important buildings on the island were built in the 9th century AD, including a church, a chapel dedicated to religious martyrs, a monastery on the eastern end (with its walls still seen today) and a cistern in the center of the island (a part of which can still be seen).

In 1911, in an event called "Hayırsızada Dog Massacre", the Governor of Istanbul ordered the stray dogs in the streets to be rounded up and exiled to Sivriada. About 80,000 dogs were killed during the ordeal, mostly due to hunger and thirst on the barren land of the island, and some due to drowning as they tried to escape the horrible conditions. A severe earthquake which immediately followed the event was perceived by the local as "a punishment by God for abandoning the dogs." That is why the island is known both as Sivriada and Hayırsızada ("the inauspicious island"). The film Taskafa, Stories of the Street (2013) by Andrea Luka Zimmerman covers the event.

=== Proposed hotel and convention center ===
In recent years, Sivri Ada was the site of a controversial development project. Plans were made to construct a hotel and convention center on the island. The project began with initial construction phases; however, it faced significant opposition from various environmental and historical preservation groups.

In 2019, the project came to a halt when Turkey's highest court intervened. The court ruled against the development, citing concerns over environmental impact and the preservation of the island's natural and historical integrity. Following this decision, all construction activities were ceased, and efforts were made to restore the island to its original state. As a result, Sivri Ada remains undeveloped and retains its natural charm, continuing to be a site of historical and ecological significance.
