= Tavşan Adası =

Island in Turkey

Coordinates: 40°49′10″N 29°06′45″E

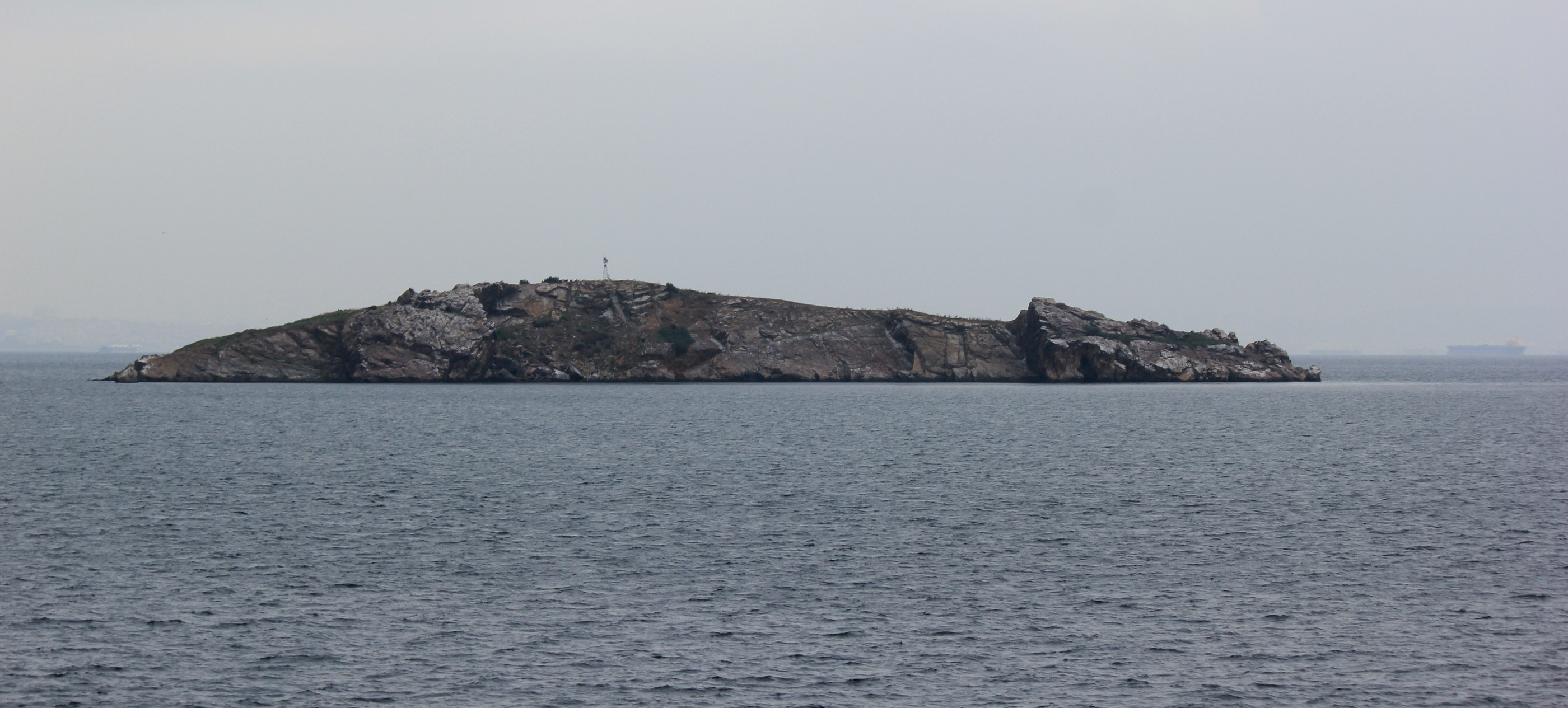
The island seen from the west

Tavşan Adası ("Rabbit Island" in Turkish) (Greek: Neandros (Νέανδρος), the name of a mythological figure.) or Balıkçı Adası is the smallest of the Princes' Islands in the Sea of Marmara, to the southeast of Istanbul, Turkey. It is under the administration of the Adalar (literally Islands or Isles) district of Istanbul Province. The island has an area of 0.004 km^{2} (0.0015 sq mi).

On 10 April 2021, it was declared as a protected vulnerable marine area through a presidential decree.

== See also ==
- List of islands of Turkey
