= Princes' Islands =

Archipelago in the Sea of Marmara, near Istanbul

Princes' Islands Adalar
- District and municipality
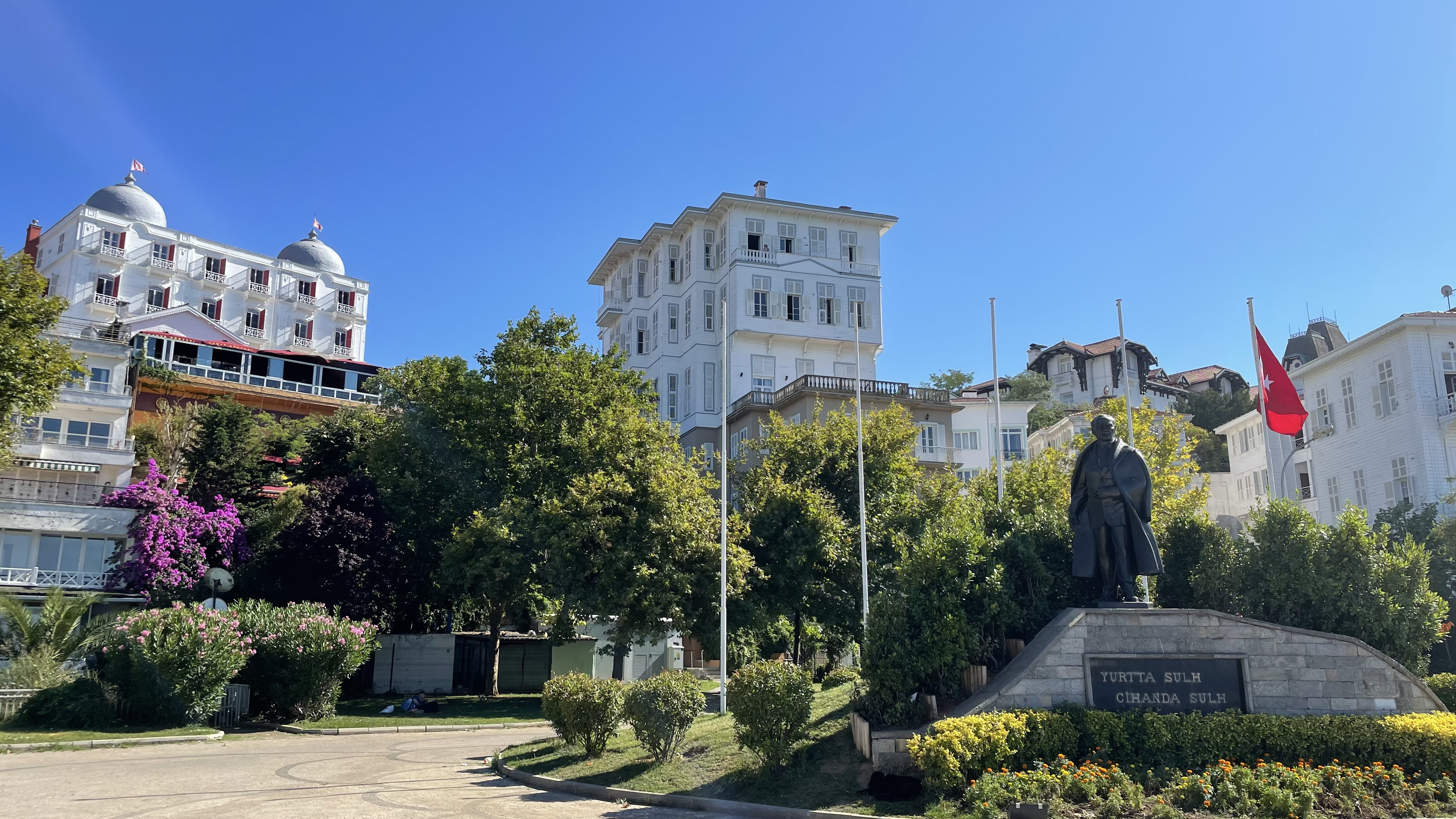
- Statue of Atatürk in Büyükada, the largest of the Princes' Islands

- Logo

- Map showing Adalar District in Istanbul Province

- Location within Turkey Location within Istanbul
- Coordinates: 40°52′N 29°06′E
- Country: Turkey
- Province: Istanbul

Government
  - Mayor: Ali Ercan Akpolat (CHP)
- Area: 11 km^{2} (4.2 sq mi)
- Population (2022): 16,690
  - Density: 1,500/km^{2} (3,900/sq mi)
- Time zone: UTC+3 (TRT)
- Postal code: 34970
- Area code: 0216
- Website: www.adalar.bel.tr

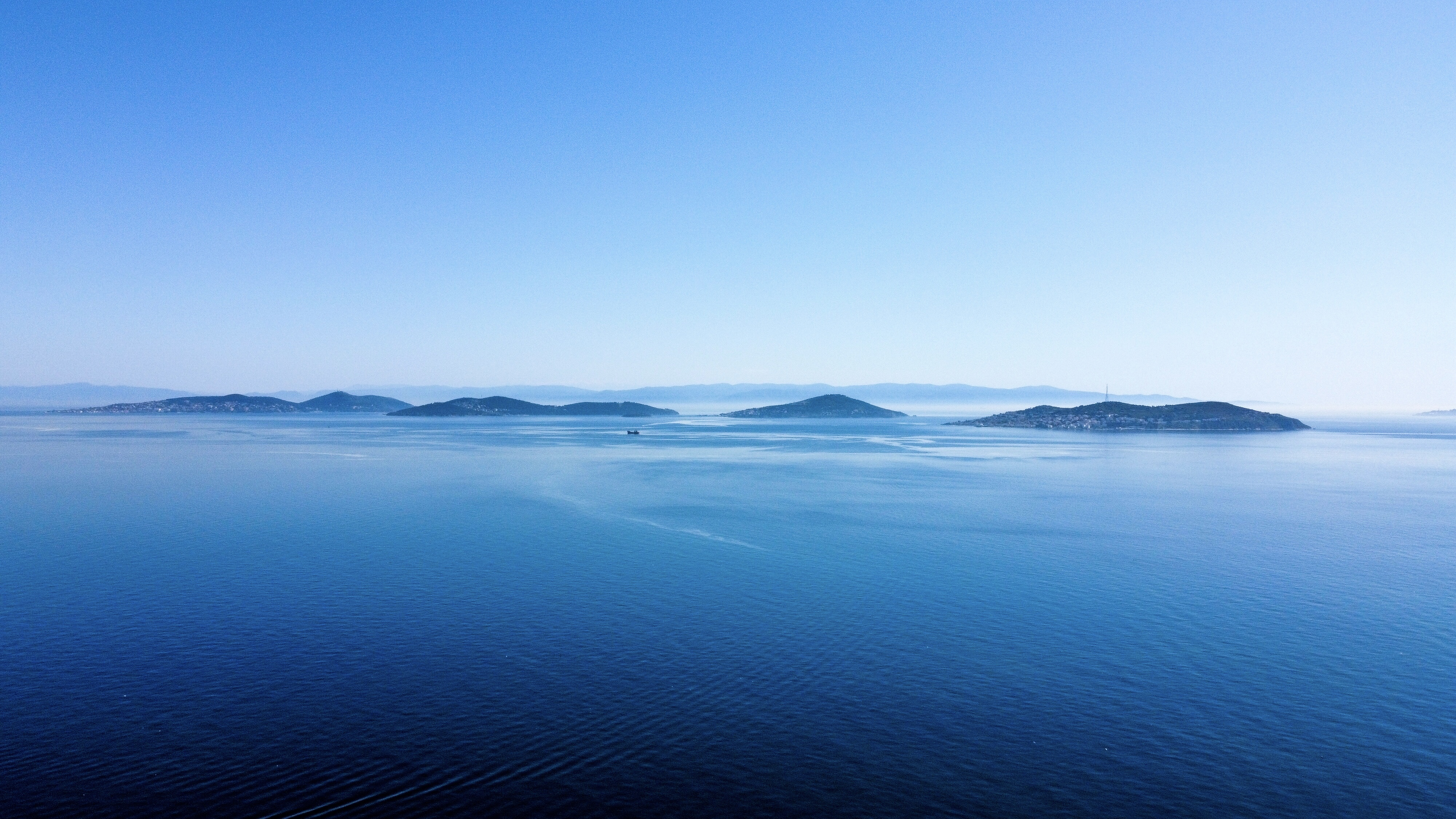
Aerial view of the four main islands from left to right (Büyükada, the largest of the Princes' Islands in the Sea of Marmara, Heybeliada, Burgazada, and Kınalıada).

The Princes' Islands (Turkish: Prens Adaları; the word "princes" is plural, because the name means "Islands of the Princes", Greek: Πριγκηπονήσια, Prigkēponḗsia), officially just Adalar (English: Islands); alternatively the Princes' Archipelago; is an archipelago of nine islands off the coast of Istanbul, Turkey, in the Sea of Marmara. These constitute the municipality and district of Adalar within Istanbul Province. With a total land area of 11 km^{2} (4.2 sq mi), it is the fifth smallest district in Istanbul and, with a permanent population of 16,690 (2022), by far the least populous district in Istanbul.

Adalar District is made up of the main four islands (Büyükada, Kınalıada, Burgazada, and Heybeliada) and the other smaller islands.

== Etymology ==
There are several references to the islands in the ancient Greek period, when they went by the name Δημόνησοι (Dēmónēsoi), often transliterated as Demonesi or Demonisi. During the Middle Byzantine period the archipelago has been recorded by the 6th century lexicographer Hesychius of Alexandria as Δημόνησοι (Dēmónēsoi), meaning "demon's islands" in Medieval Greek. In 1795 German cartographer Franz Ludwig Güssefeld recorded the islands under the name Papadónisi, meaning "priest's islands".

According to Sevan Nişanyan there has not been a historical proper name for the islands in the Turkish language.

== History ==
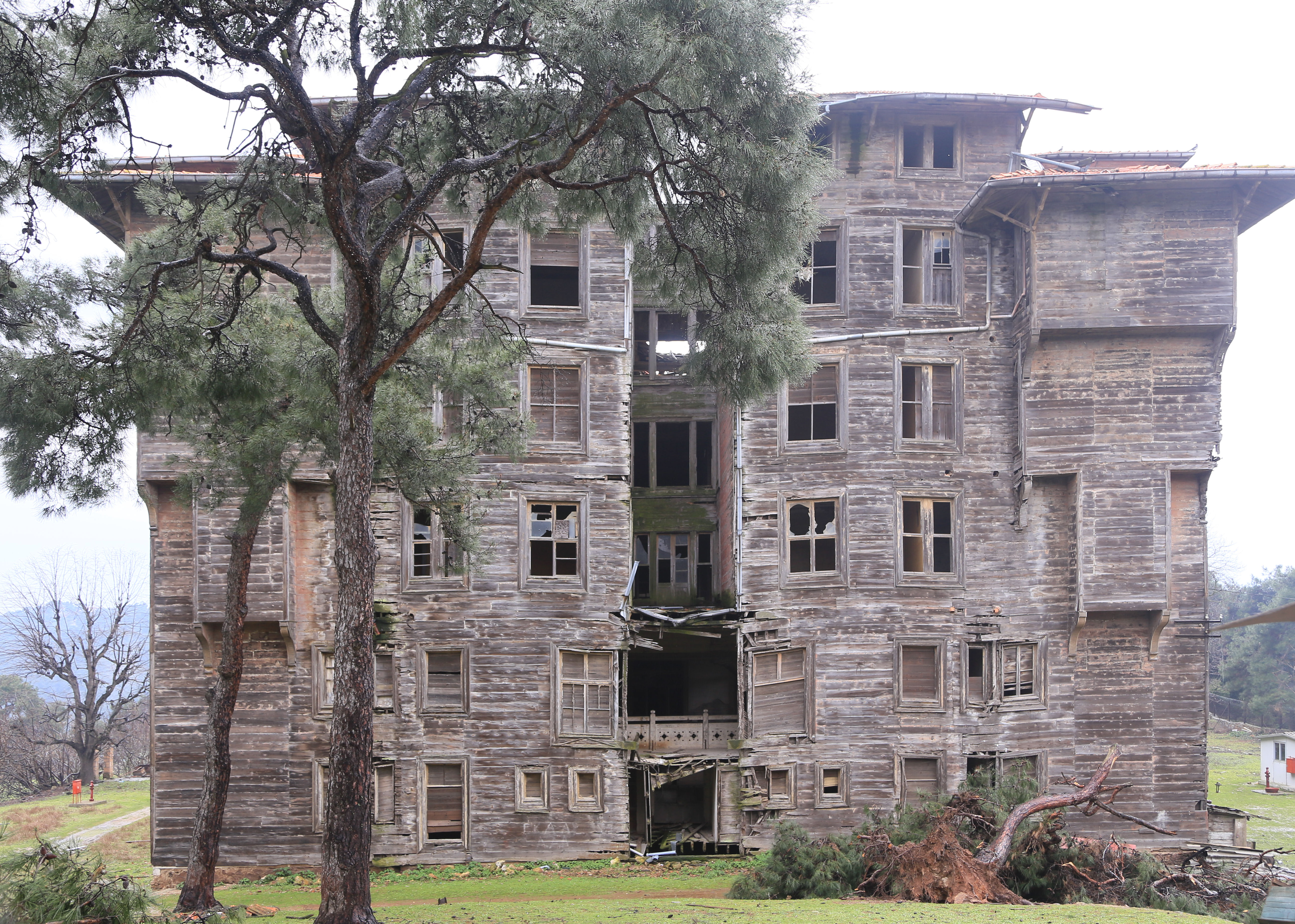
Prinkipo Greek Orthodox Orphanage in Büyükada, the largest wooden building in Europe and second largest in the world.

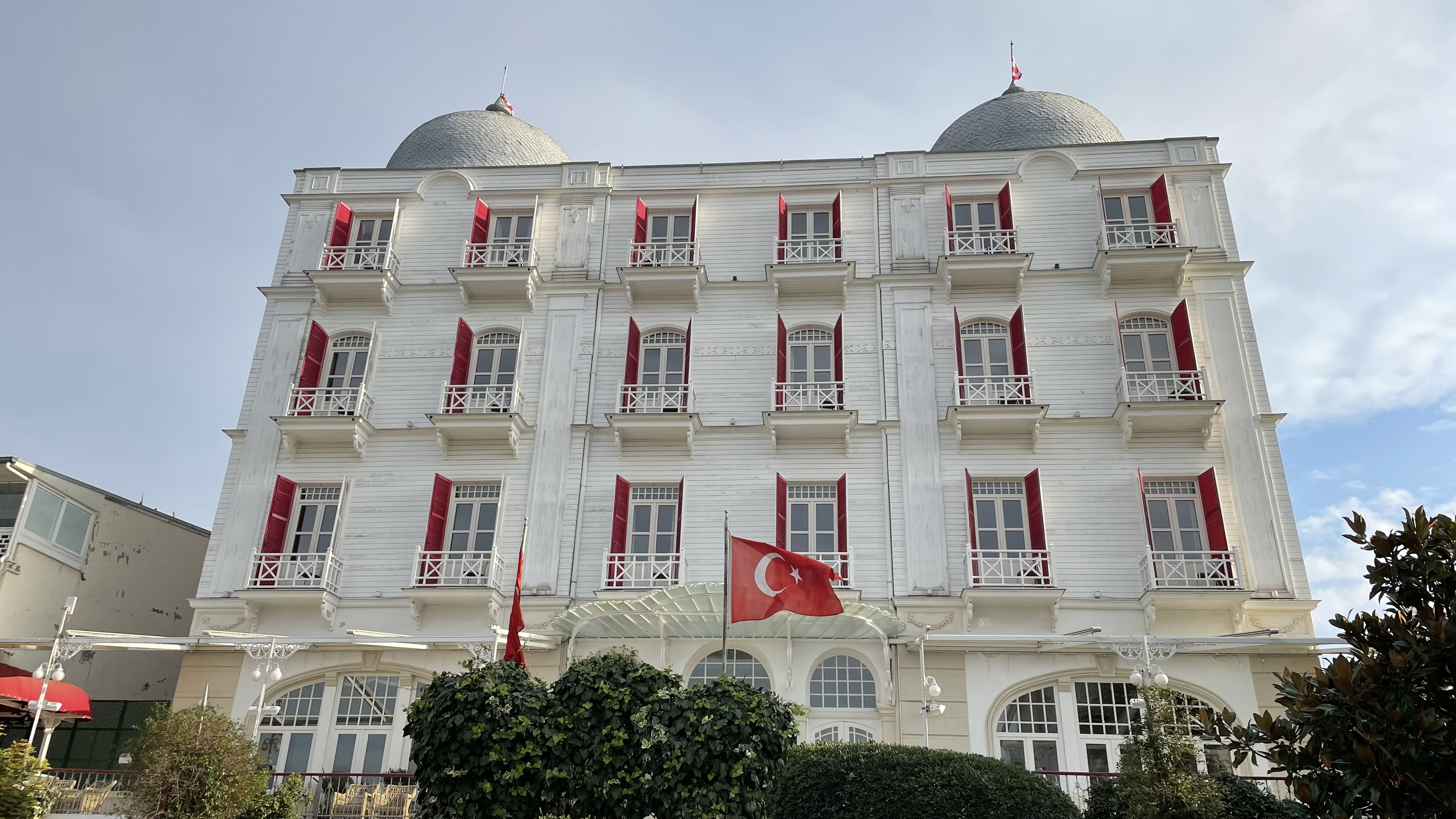
The historic Splendid Palace Hotel (1908) in Büyükada.

During the period of the Byzantine Empire, out-of-favor princes and other royalty were exiled on the islands. After 1453, members of the Ottoman sultans' family were exiled there too, hence the island's present name. The Ottoman fleet captured the islands during the siege of Constantinople in 1453.

During the nineteenth century, the islands became a popular resort for Istanbul's wealthy, and Victorian-era cottages and houses are still preserved on the largest of the Princes' Islands. According to the Ottoman general census of 1881/82–1893, the kaza of the Princes' Islands (Adalar) had a total population of 7,937, consisting of 5,501 Greeks, 533 Armenians, 254 Muslims, 133 Catholics, 65 Jews, 27 Latins, 7 Protestants, 3 Bulgarians and 1.404 foreign citizens.

The Halki seminary, formally the Theological School of Halki (Greek: Θεολογική Σχολή Χάλκης and Turkish: Ortodoks Ruhban Okulu), was founded on 1 October 1844 on the island of Halki (Turkish: Heybeliada), the second-largest of the Princes' Islands in the Sea of Marmara. It was the main school of theology of the Eastern Orthodox Church's Ecumenical Patriarchate of Constantinople until the Turkish parliament enacted a law banning private higher-education institutions in 1971. The theological school is located at the top of the island's Hill of Hope, on the site of the Byzantine-era Monastery of the Holy Trinity. The premises of the school continue to be maintained by the monastery and are used to host conferences. It is possible to visit the island where it is located via boat in approximately one hour from the shore of Istanbul.

In 1912 the islands had a population of 10,250 Greeks and 670 Turks. The islands have become more and more ethnically Turkish in character due to the influx of wealthy Turkish jetsetters, a process which began in the 1920s in the first days of the Turkish Republic when the British Yacht Club on Büyükada was appropriated as Anadolu Kulübü for Turkish parliamentarians to enjoy Istanbul in the summer. The islands are an interesting anomaly because they allow for a very rare, albeit incomplete, insight into a multicultural society in modern Turkey, possibly akin to the multicultural society that once existed during the Ottoman Empire in places such as nearby Istanbul/Constantinople. Prior to the 1950s, each of the inhabited islands had significant communities of ethnic minorities of Turkey, which is now the case to a much smaller extent. Since the vast majority of the residents and visitors are Turkish, today the minority legacy is of cultural rather than demographic importance.

== Geography ==
Princes' Islands are located in the Sea of Marmara, near the coast of southeastern Istanbul. The distance from the Istanbul mainland changes between 13 and 25 km (8.1 and 15.5 mi), the closest being Kınalıada and farthest being Tavşanadası. Excluding Yassıada, Sivriada and Tavşanadası, all of the archipelago is located on a 12-kilometre-long (7.5 mi) line running from northwest (Kınalıada) to southeast (Sedefadası).

The island chain consists of four larger islands, Büyükada ("Big Island") with an area of 5.46 km^{2} (2.11 sq mi), Heybeliada ("Saddlebag Island") with an area of 2.4 km^{2} (0.93 sq mi), Burgazada ("Fortress Island") with an area of 1.5 km^{2} (0.58 sq mi), Kınalıada ("Henna Island") with an area of 1.3 km^{2} (0.50 sq mi), and five much smaller ones, Sedef Adası ("Mother-of-Pearl Island") with an area of 0.157 km^{2} (0.061 sq mi), Yassıada ("Flat Island") with an area of 0.05 km^{2} (0.019 sq mi), Sivriada ("Sharp Island") with an area of 0.4 km^{2} (0.15 sq mi), Kaşık Adası ("Spoon Island") with an area of 0.6 km^{2} (0.23 sq mi), and Tavşan Adası ("Rabbit Island") with an area of 0.4 km^{2} (0.15 sq mi).

All islands contain hills, the highest being Büyükada's Aya Yorgi Hill with 203 meters of elevation.

== Islands ==
=== Büyükada ===
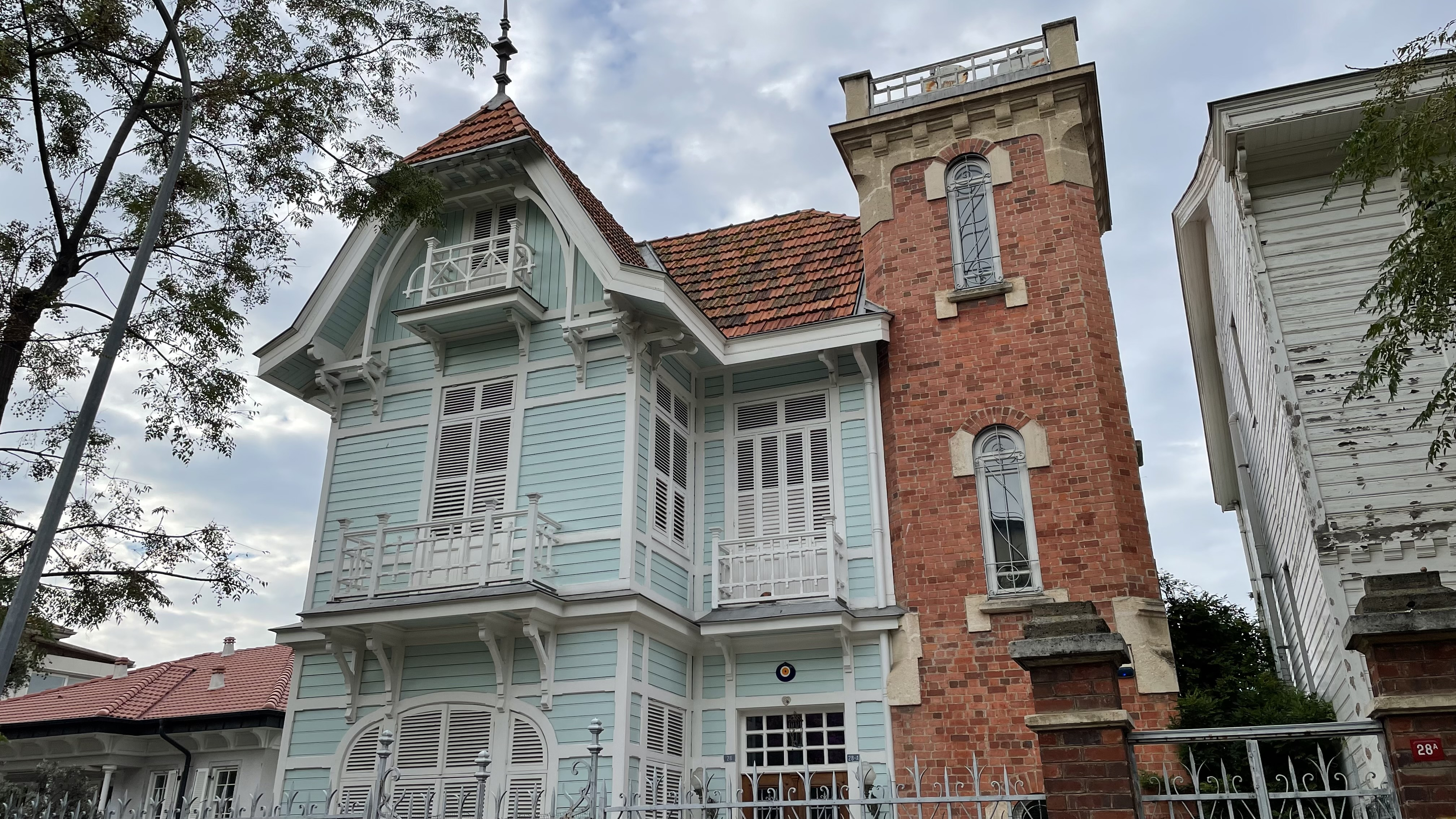
One of numerous Ottoman-era mansions which line the streets of Büyükada

Büyükada (meaning "Big Island" in Turkish; Greek: Πρίγκηπος, romanized: Prígkēpos) is the largest of the nine islands comprising the Princes' Islands in the Marmara Sea, close to Istanbul. As on the other islands, motorized vehicles – except service vehicles – are forbidden, so visitors explore the island by foot; by riding a bicycle (numerous bicycle shops rent them with hourly prices); or in battery powered electric vehicles which function like taxi cabs, also offering "round-the-island" sightseeing tours. Until 2020 there were horse-drawn carriages on the island, but these were phased out due to a serious equine disease. A convent on Büyükada was the place of exile for the Byzantine empresses Irene, Euphrosyne, Theophano, Zoe and Anna Dalassena. After his deportation from the Soviet Union in February 1929, Leon Trotsky also stayed for four years on Büyükada, his first station in exile. Fahrünissa Şakir (known as Princess Fahrelnissa Zeid after her second marriage) was born on the island. There are several historical buildings on Büyükada, such as the Ayia Yorgi Church and Monastery dating back to the sixth century, the Ayios Dimitrios Church, and the Hamidiye Mosque built by Abdul Hamid II. Büyükada consists of two peaks. The one nearest the iskele (ferry landing), Hristos, is topped by the former Greek Orphanage, a huge wooden building now known as the Prinkipo Environmental Center. In the valley between the two hills sit the church and monastery of Ayios Nikolaos and a former fairground called Luna Park. Visitors can take the 'small tour' of the island by horse-drawn vehicle, leading to this point, from where it is an easy climb to Ayia Yorgi, a tiny church with a café on the grounds serving wine, chips and sausage sandwiches, this being part of the "classic" Ayia Yorgi (St. George, in Greek: Άγιος Γεώργιος) experience.

=== Heybeliada ===
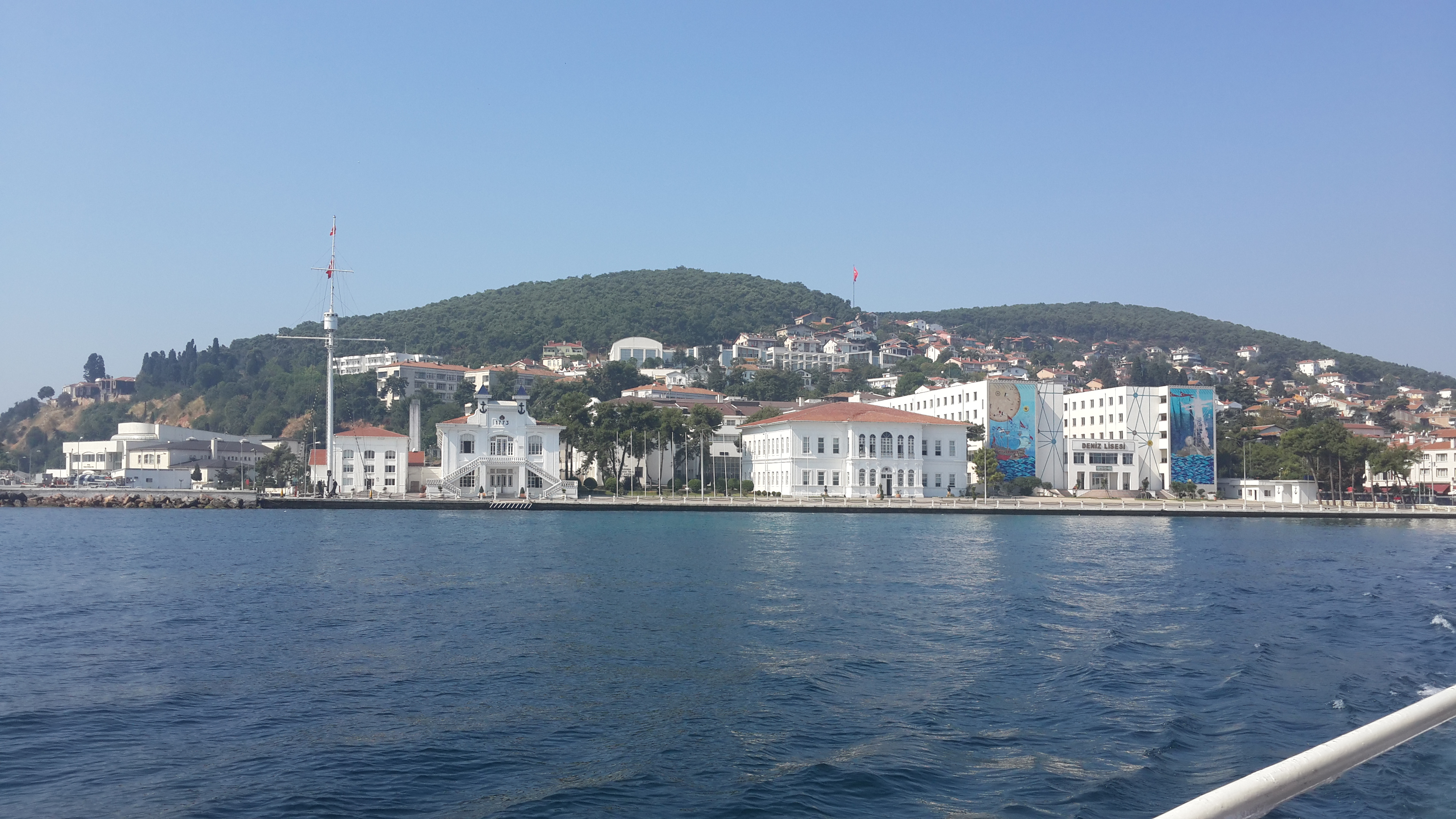
Naval Cadet School in Heybeliada, the second largest of the Princes' Islands

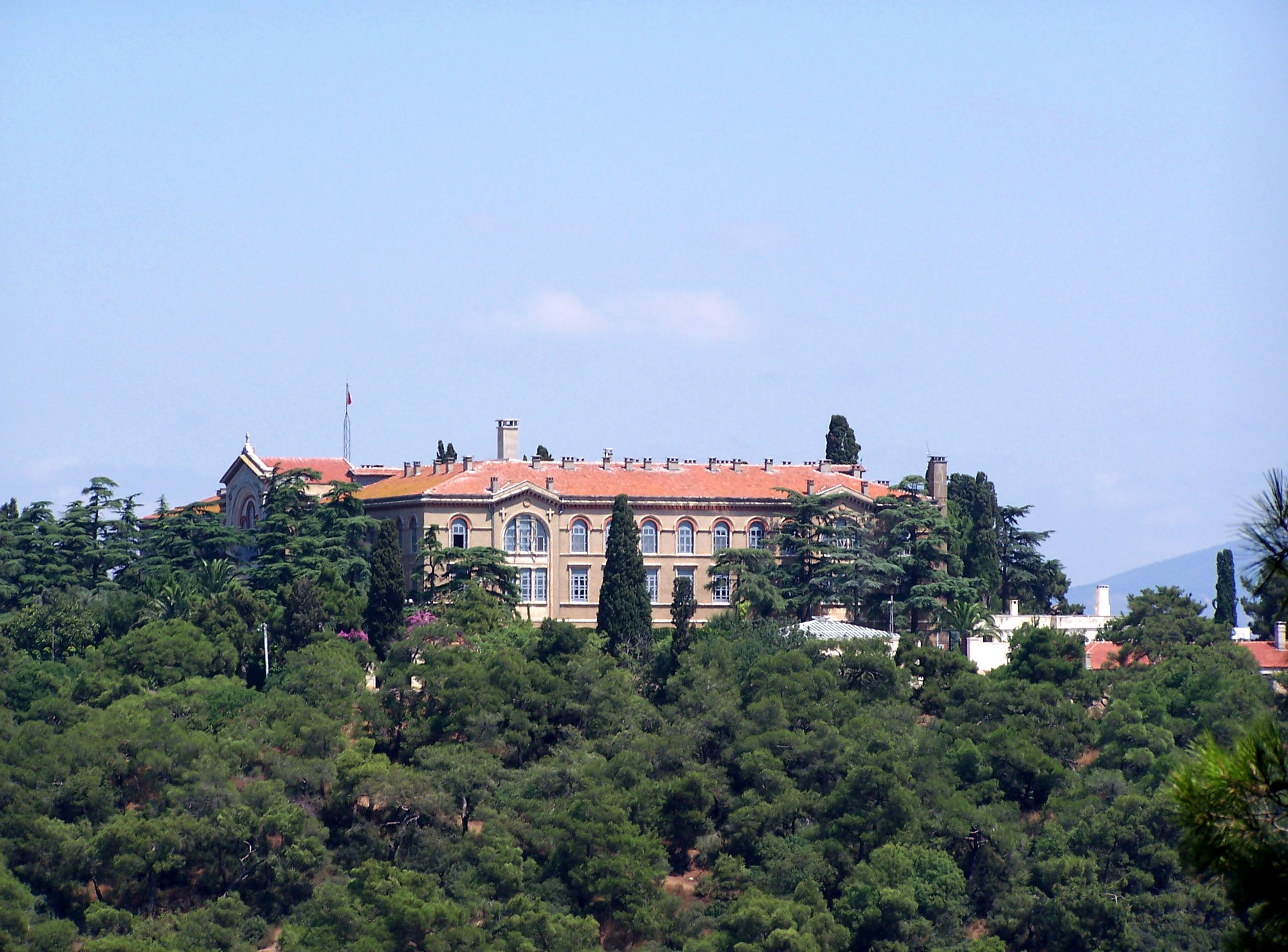
Halki seminary in Heybeliada.

Heybeliada (meaning "Saddlebag Island" in Turkish; Greek: Χάλκη, romanized: Chálkē, also rendered Halki) is the second largest of the Princes' Islands in the Sea of Marmara. It is a neighbourhood in the Adalar district of Istanbul. The large Naval Cadet School overlooks the jetty to the left as you get off the ferry. There are two interesting pieces of architecture on the grounds of the school. One is Kamariotissa, the only remaining Byzantine church on the island, and more importantly the last church to be built before the conquest of Constantinople. The other is the grave of the second English Ambassador to be sent to Constantinople by Elizabeth I of England, Edward Barton, who chose to live on Heybeli to escape the bustle of the city. To the right of the jetty lies the town with its bars and cafes, a hotel that stays open all year round, and many lovely wooden houses. At the top of the central mountain is an eleventh-century Greek Orthodox monastery, it houses the Halki seminary, the only Greek Orthodox seminary in Turkey and Theological Seminary of the Ecumenical Patriarchate closed by the Turkish Government in 1971, after the ban on private higher-education institutions passed the Parliament. The monastery attracts tourists from all over Greece and Turkey, and despite the Turkish Government's promise to reopen the seminary, it still remains closed. To prevent the island from becoming polluted, the only motorized vehicles permitted on the island are service vehicles such as ambulances, fire trucks, police cars, and the like. The only forms of transport are by foot, horse and buggy and service transport. There is no airport; the only way of getting there is by boat. The winter population of the island is around 3,000, but in the summer, the owners of the summer houses return and the population swells to 10,000. The main summer attractions are small-scale open-air concerts sponsored by the local council, a swimming and fitness club next to the sea, and an annual Independence Day march, which is commemorated by a resident naval band touring the island.

=== Burgazada ===
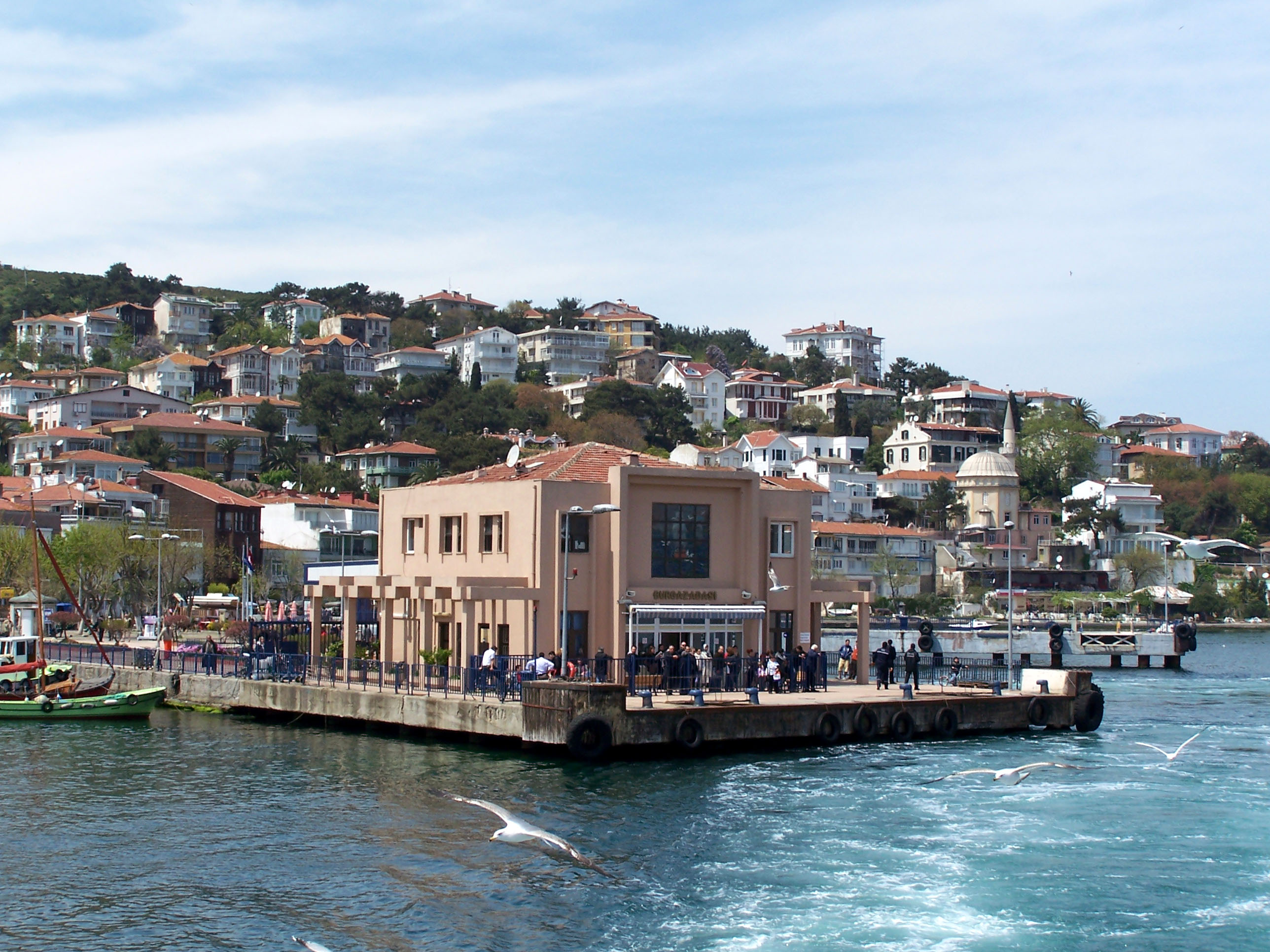
Ferry port of Burgazada

Burgazada (meaning "Fortress Island" in Turkish; Greek: Ἀντιγόνη, romanized: Antigónē) is the third largest of the Islands, a single hill 2 km across. Demetrius I of Macedon, one of the Diadochi (Successors) of Alexander the Great, built a fort here and named it after his father Antigonus I Monophthalmus. The island took this name, but today is generally known by the Turks simply as "Burgaz" (Turkish for "fort"). In 2003 Burgaz suffered a forest fire, losing 4 square kilometres of woodland. Burgaz is a common setting and even a major theme for writer Sait Faik Abasıyanık, where he also resided. Today, his residence is kept as a museum. At his favourite restaurant in Kalpazankaya (the counterfeiter's rock) one will also find his bronze statue enjoying the view with a glass of rakı freshly filled everyday by the restaurant owners. Until the mid-20th century, Burgazada was predominantly Jewish.

=== Kınalıada ===
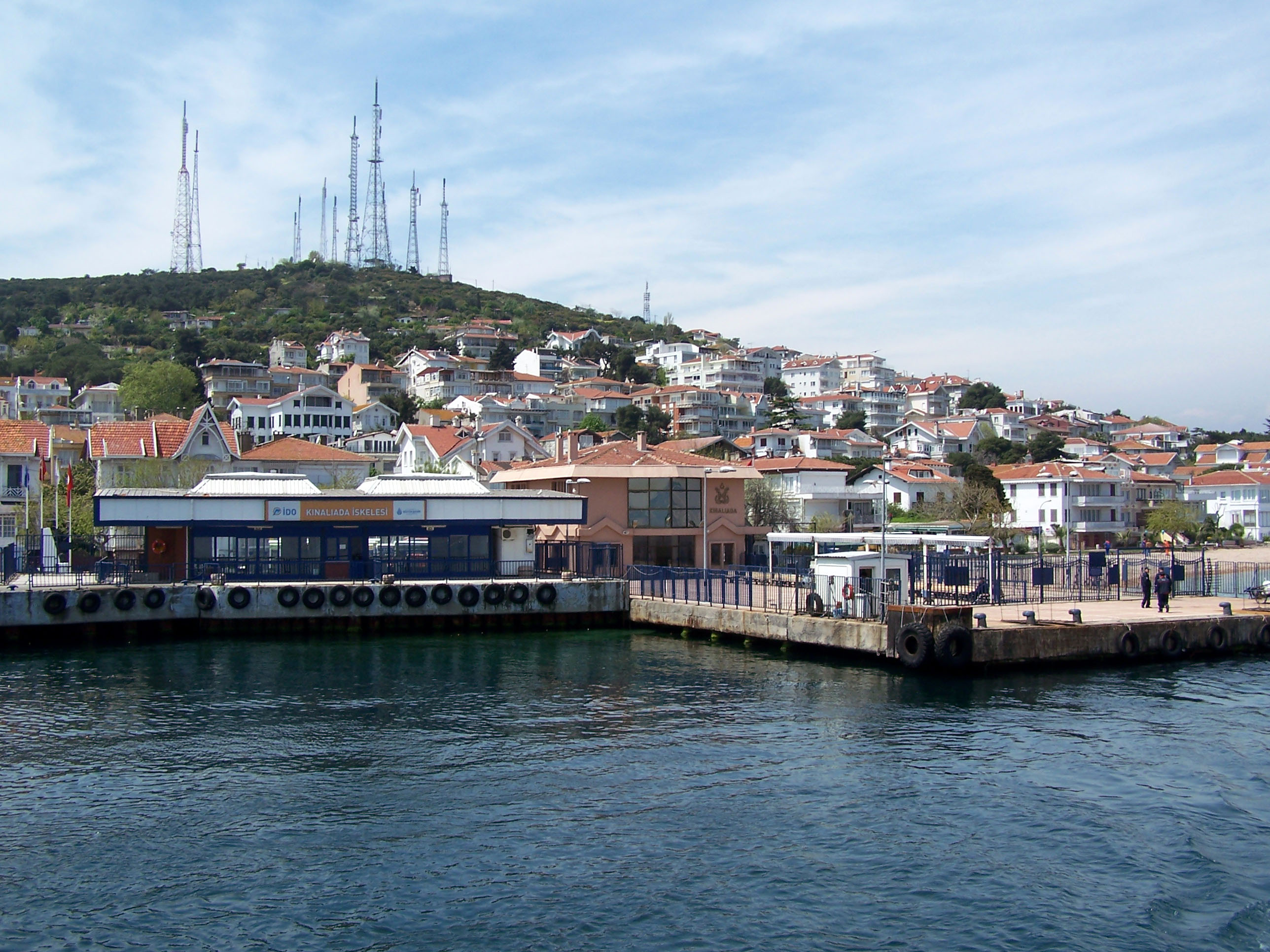
Ferry port of Kınalıada

Kınalıada (meaning "Henna Island" in Turkish, named after the colour of its earth; Greek: Πρώτη, romanized: Prṓtē, "First") is the nearest island to the European and Asian side of Istanbul, about 12 kilometres (7 mi) to the south. This is one of the least forested islands, and the land has a reddish colour from the iron and copper that has been mined here. This was the island most used as a place of exile in Byzantine times (the most notable exile being the former emperors Romanos I Lekapenos from 944, and Romanos IV Diogenes, after the Battle of Manzikert, 1071). Also, this island has a historical abbey top of it. From the 19th century to the mid-20th century, Kınalıada was predominantly Armenian, giving it the highest density of Armenians living anywhere in Istanbul, albeit mainly in summer homes. During the summer, approximately 90% of the population on the island was Armenian. The island was also a summer retreat for the Armenian patriarchs of Istanbul. The islands are reachable by ferry services that depart from Kabataş on the European side. The voyage takes about 25 minutes by fast ferry and 40 minutes by regular ferry (vapur).

=== Sedef Island ===
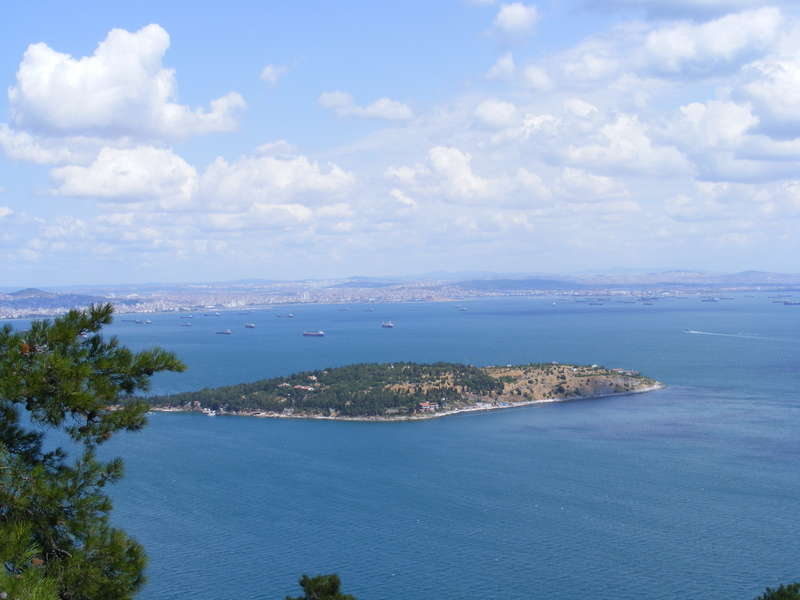
A view of Sedef Island from Büyükada

Sedef Island, (Turkish: Sedef Adası, meaning "Mother-of-Pearl Island" in Turkish; Greek: Τερέβινθος, romanized: Terébinthos, also in the modern corrupted form Αντιρόβυθος, Antiróvythos) is one of the smallest islands of the archipelago, and has 108 private homes. The section that's open to the general public largely consists of a beach hamlet. The island is mostly private property and the current pine forests were largely planted by its owner Şehsuvar Menemencioğlu, who purchased the island in 1956 and also played an important role in the imposition of a strict building code to make sure that the island's nature and environment will be protected. He has forbidden the building of structures with more than 2 floors. The island's Greek name, Terebinthos, means "terebinth", which suggests a significant presence of the terebinth in earlier times. In 857 AD Patriarch Ignatios of Constantinople was exiled to the island and imprisoned for 10 years before being re-elected as Patriarch in 867 AD.

=== Yassıada ===
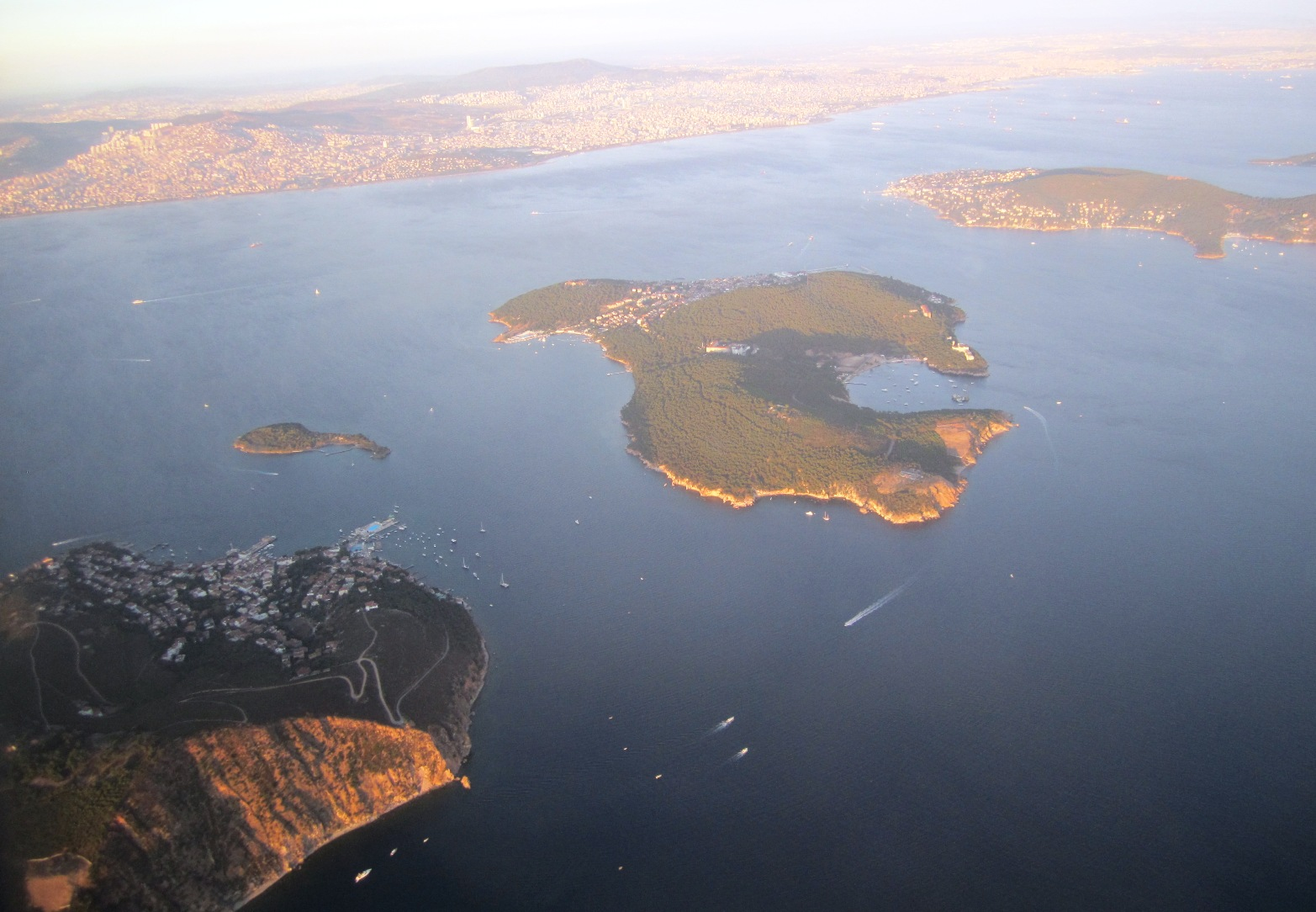
Adalar

Yassıada (meaning "Flat Island" in Turkish; Greek: Πλάτη, romanized: Plátē) was used by the Byzantines for sending prominent figures into exile. One such person was the Armenian Patriarch (Catholicos) Narses who was first sent to this island before being imprisoned at Büyükada in the 4th century AD. In the 11th century AD the Byzantines used the island for political prisoners. The remains of the 4 underground prison cells from this period can still be seen. The Byzantines also built a monastery and church on the island. Yassıada (Plati) was captured by the Latin Crusaders during the Fourth Crusade in 1204. In 1857, Yassıada was purchased by the British ambassador Henry Bulwer, brother of novelist Edward Bulwer-Lytton, who built himself a mansion and a number of other structures to live undisturbed on this distant island. Henry Bulwer also organized agricultural production on the island to self-sustain his little realm at least to a certain degree, but later sold Yassıada to the Khedive of Ottoman Egypt and Sudan, Ismail Pasha; who, however, didn't construct any new buildings and completely neglected the island. With the establishment of the Republic of Turkey in 1923, the island became a property of the Turkish state, and in 1947 Yassıada was handed over to the Turkish Navy which built several school buildings. Between 1960 and 1961, these school buildings became the venue for the trials of the members of the former ruling party, Demokrat Parti, after the military coup of 1960. Several of the defendants were sentenced to death, and three of these, including the former Prime Minister Adnan Menderes, were taken to İmralı Island (further southwest, near the southern shoreline of the Sea of Marmara) and executed in 1961. After the end of the trials, Yassıada was given back to the Turkish Navy and lessons continued to take place at the naval school buildings until 1978. In 1993, the island became the property of Istanbul University's department of Marine Life and Sea Products, which used it for lessons and research. However, the strong winds on the island made life difficult for the students and eventually classes were held elsewhere. Today, the island is a favourite location for scuba diving schools like Balıkadam Türkiye as well as amateur divers.

=== Sivriada ===
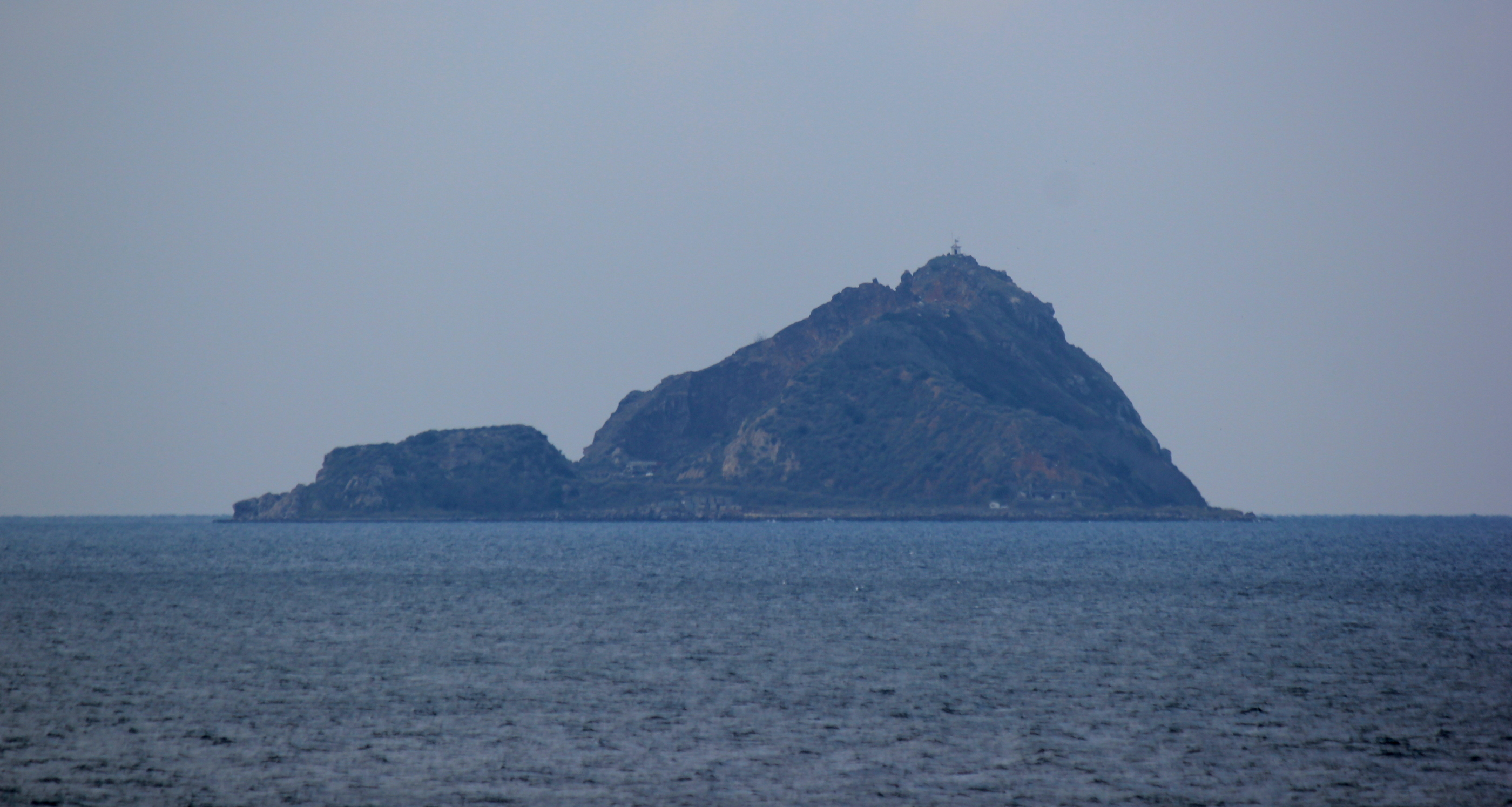
Sivriada

Sivriada (meaning "Sharp Island" in Turkish; Greek: Ὀξεία, romanized: Oxeía) currently is deserted. The island was often used by the Byzantine clerics as a distant place for peaceful worship, and by the Byzantine emperors as a convenient prison to detain prominent people whom they deemed troublesome. The first famous person to be imprisoned on the island by the order of emperor Nikephoros I was Plato of Sakkoudion, the uncle of renowned cleric Theodoros Stoudites, for supporting his nephew in his conflict with the emperor. Other famous people who stayed in the island for religious and political reasons were Gebon, Basil Skleros, Nikephoritzes (the chief minister of Michael VII Doukas), Patriarch John of Constantinople and Patriarch Michael II of Constantinople. The graves of those who died in the island during the Byzantine period can still be seen today. The ruins of a Roman settlement and a ninth-century Byzantine monastery can still be seen on the shore, close to the fishermen's shelter, a small wharf which is often used by yachts. The most important buildings on the island were built in the ninth century AD, including a church, a chapel dedicated to religious martyrs, a monastery on the eastern end (with its walls still seen today) and a cistern in the center of the island (a part of which can still be seen).

=== Kaşık Island ===
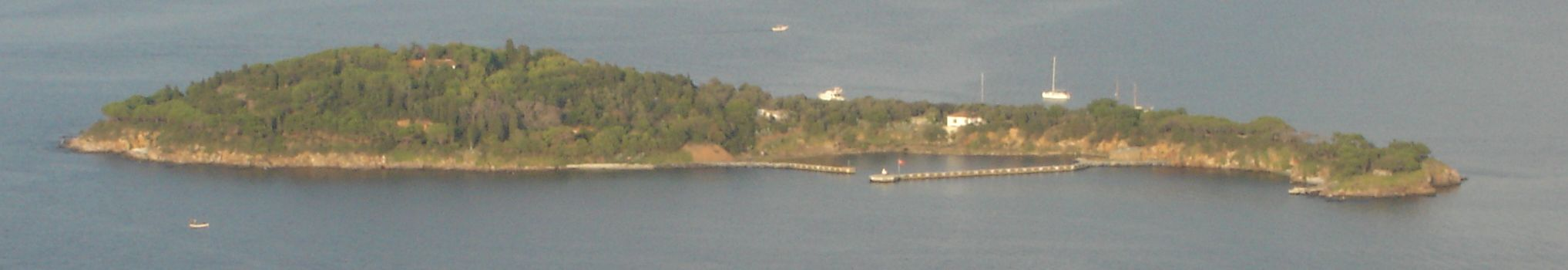
Kaşık Adası (Spoon Island) viewed from Burgazada

Kaşık Island, (meaning "Spoon Island" in Turkish; Greek: Πίτα, romanized: Píta) is located between the islands of Burgazada and Heybeliada. Kaşık Adası is officially administered by the Burgazada neighborhood in the Adalar district of Istanbul. It is the second-smallest of the Princes' Islands, with an area of 0.006 km^{2} (0.0023 sq mi).

=== Tavşan Island ===
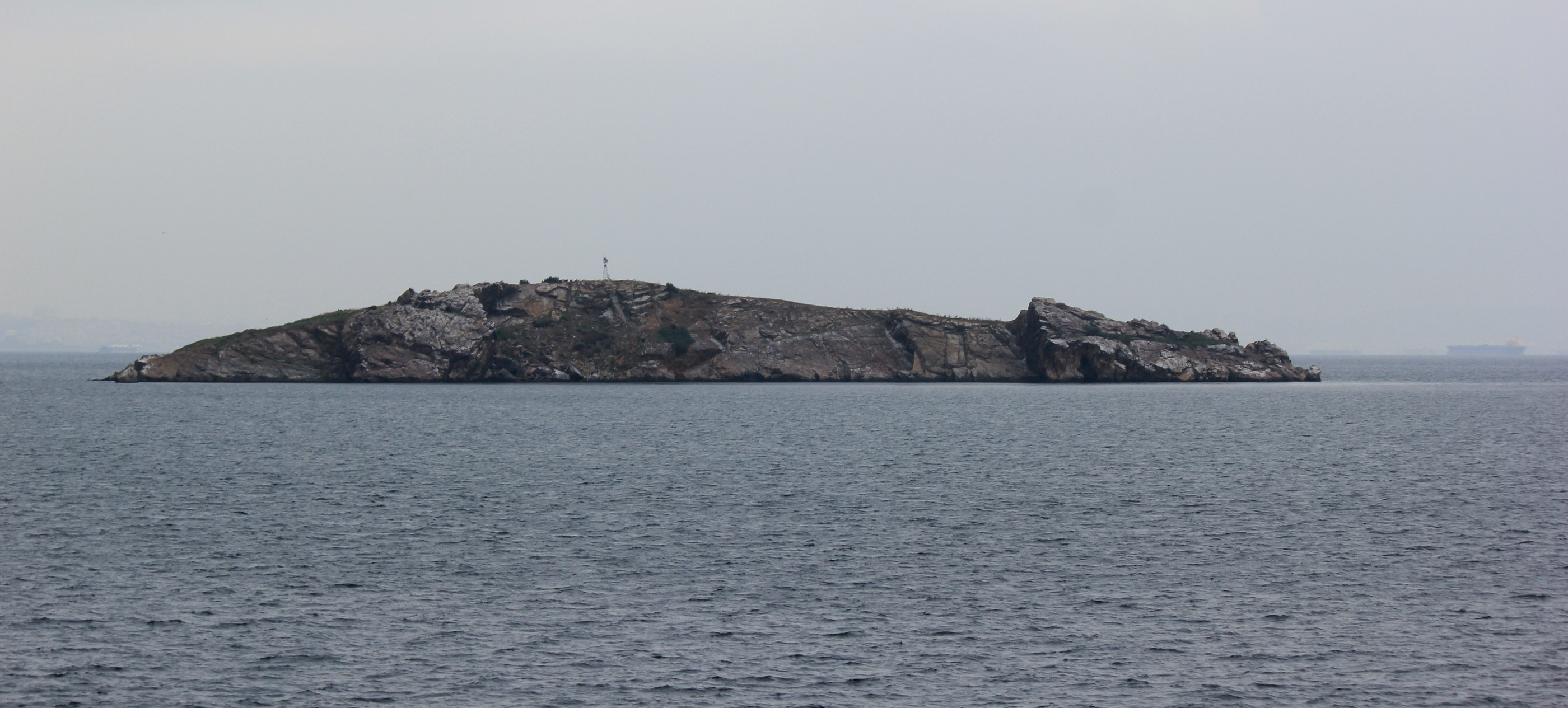
Tavşan Adası

Tavşan Adası (meaning "Rabbit Island" in Turkish; Greek: Νέανδρος, romanized: Néandros, the name of a mythological figure) is the smallest of the Princes' Islands, with an area of 0.004 km^{2} (0.0015 sq mi).

=== Former islands ===
The Vordonos Islands, which were 700 meters away from the Istanbul mainland, were hypothesized to be almost fully submerged during the 1010 earthquake, though this has been contested by citing a 1770 drawing of the islands in The Gentleman's Magazine. Two skerries that are located off the coast of Dragos and Küçükyalı have been identified with the sunken islands of Vordonosi. The skerries currently contain two lighthouses to ward off ships against shallow waters.

== Politics and administration ==
The mayor of the Adalar district is Erdem Gül of the CHP. Historically Recep Koç (ANAP, 1984–1994), Can Esen (ANAP, 1994–1999), Coşkun Özden (ANAP, afterwards AKP 1999–2009), Mustafa Farsakoğlu (CHP, 2009–2014) and Atilla Aytaç (CHP, 2014–2019) had been mayors of the district. The provincial governor is Mevlüt Kurban. In the 2023 Turkish presidential election the district voted overwhelmingly for the Kemal Kılıçdaroğlu with more than 74% of the votes cast for him.

There are five neighbourhoods in Adalar District:

- Burgazada
- Heybeliada
- Kınalıada
- Maden
- Nizam

== Economy ==
According to a 2017 study Adalar is among the wealthiest districts of Istanbul concerning monthly household income.

=== Tourism ===
During the summer months, the Princes' Islands are popular destinations for day trips from Istanbul. As for cultural tourism, Büyükada happens to have the first and only city museum in İstanbul, the Museum of the Princes' Islands in Aya Nikola Bay.

== Transportation ==
As there is almost no motor traffic on the Islands, the only transport being bicycles and horse and cart, they are more peaceful than the city of Istanbul. They are just a short ferry ride from Istanbul, with ferries departing from Bostancı, Kadıköy, Kartal and Maltepe on the Asian side, and from Beşiktaş and Kabataş on the European side. Most ferries call in turn at the four largest of the nine islands: Kınalıada, Burgazada, Heybeliada and, finally, Büyükada. Ferry and ship services are provided by six different companies. In spring and autumn, the islands are quieter and more pleasant, although the sea can be rough in spring, autumn and winter, and the islands are sometimes cut off from the outside world when the ferry services are cancelled due to storms and high waves. During winter, with the addition of the biting cold and the strong winds and the resulting ferry cancellations, the islands become almost deserted.

== Notable residents ==
Many Turks fondly remember the Islands as the home of the famous short-story writer Sait Faik Abasıyanık (1906–1954) and of the football legend Lefter Küçükandonyadis (1925–2012).

After the deportation of Leon Trotsky from the Soviet Union in February 1929, his first residence in exile was a house in Büyükada, the largest of the Princes' Islands; he lived there for four years between 1929 and 1933.

The famous poet Nâzım Hikmet attended the Naval Cadet School in Heybeliada between 1913 and 1918.

Famous Armenian writers and poets have lived on the islands, including Zahrad (1924–2007) and Zabel Sibil Asadour (1863–1934), both of whom lived in Kınalıada.

According to Kōnstantinoupolis employee Manuel Gedeon, Ottoman Greek publisher Demetrius Nicolaides (c. 1843-1915) had a house in Antigone (Burgazada).

== International relations ==
Princes' Islands are twinned with:

- Cholpon-Ata, Kyrgyzstan
- Nacka, Sweden
- Palaio Faliro, Greece
- Pokhara, Nepal
- Santa Ana, Costa Rica
- Veles, North Macedonia
