= Sedef Island =

Island in Istanbul

Coordinates: 40°51′00″N 29°08′40″E

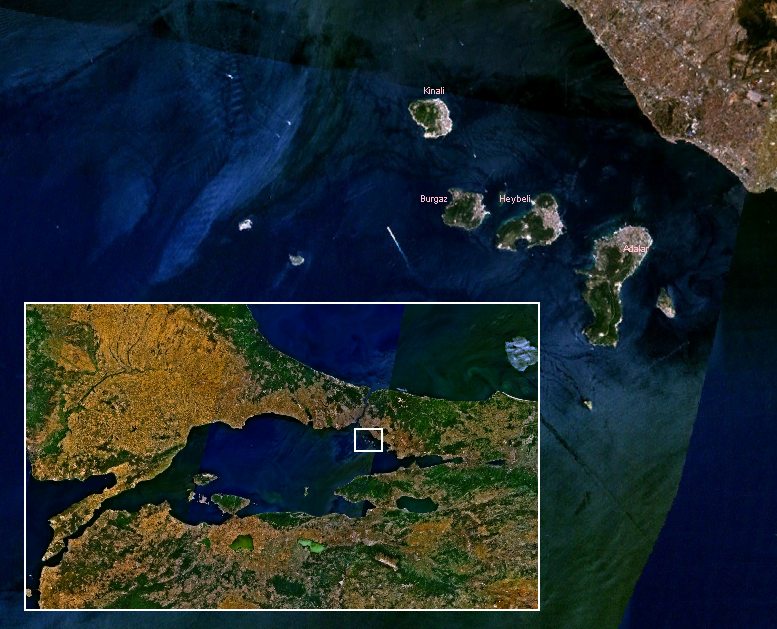
Satellite photo of the Princes' Islands (Sedef Adası is the first small island at right, next to Büyükada)

Sedef Island, (Turkish: Sedef Adası, literally "Mother-of-Pearl Island"; Greek: Τερέβυνθος Terebinthos, and in ancient times also Androvitha or Andircuithos) is one of the nine islands consisting the Princes' Islands in the Sea of Marmara, near Istanbul, Turkey. Sedef Adası is officially a neighbourhood in the Adalar district of Istanbul.

With an area of 0.157 km², it is one of the smallest islands of the archipelago. The island is mostly private property and the current pine forests were largely planted by its owner Şehsuvar Menemencioğlu, who purchased the island in 1956 and also played an important role in the imposition of a strict building code to make sure that the island's nature and environment will be protected. It is not allowed to build houses with more than 2 floors.

The island's Greek name, Terebinthos, means "turpentine", which suggests a significant presence of the turpentine tree or terebinth in earlier times. In 857 AD Patriarch Ignatios of Constantinople was sent in exile to the island, where he was imprisoned for 10 years before being re-elected as Patriarch in 867 AD.

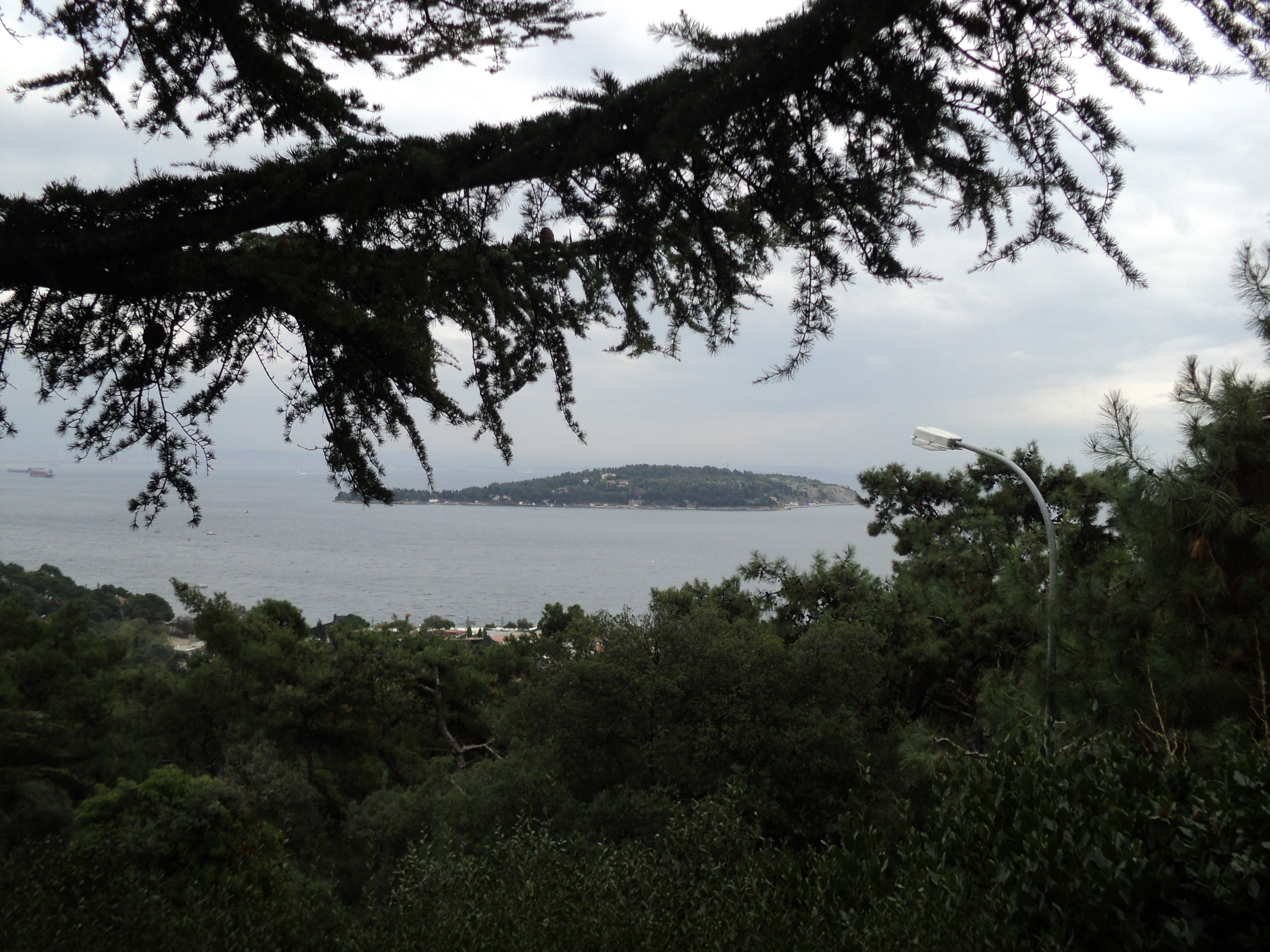
A view of Sedef Adası from Büyükada.

== See also ==
- List of islands of Turkey
