= Burgazada =

Island in the Sea of Marmara, near Istanbul, Turkey

- Neighbourhood
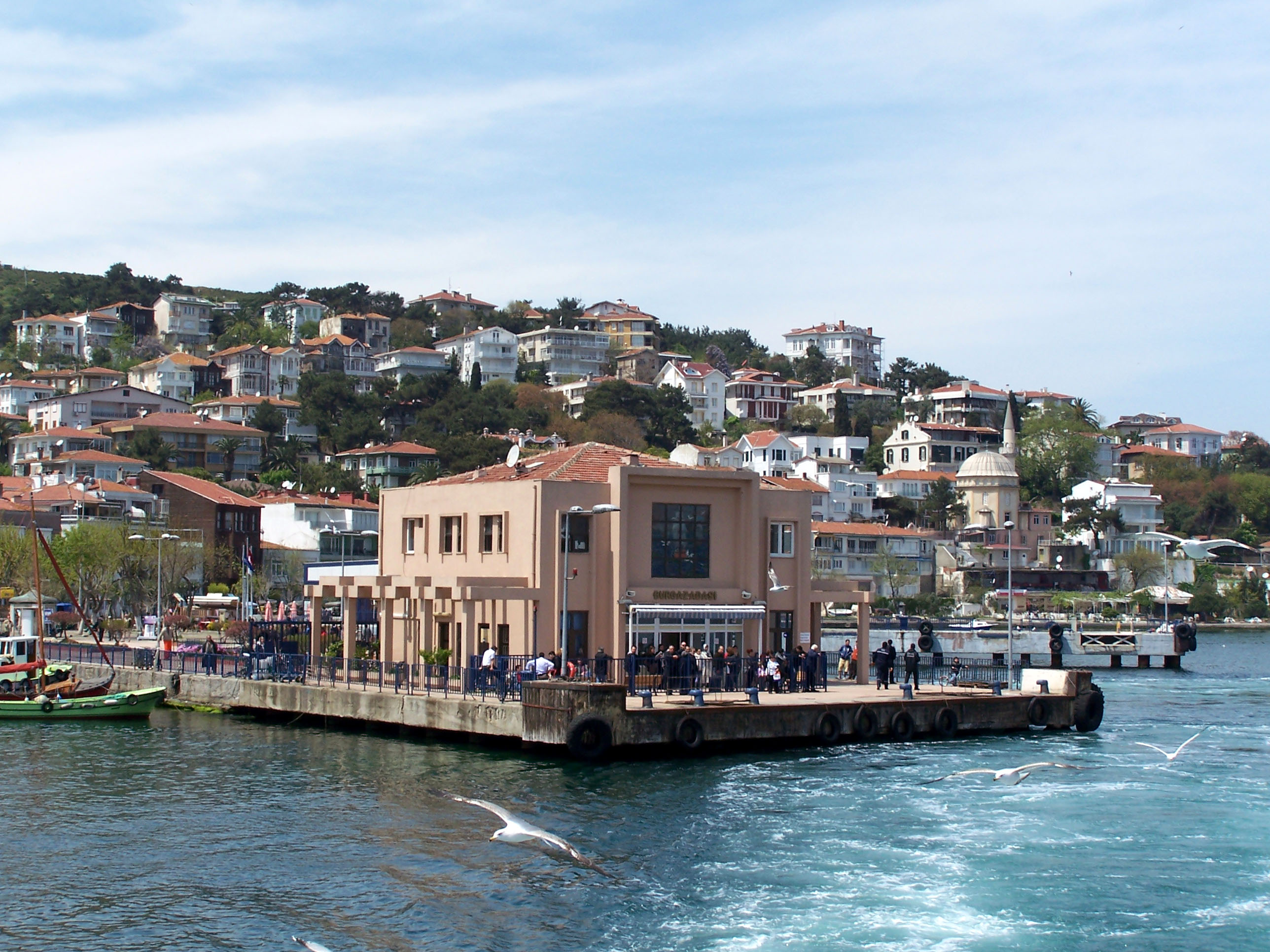
- Old ferry port of Burgazada

- Location within Turkey Location within Istanbul
- Coordinates: 40.8799°N 29.0618°E
- Country: Turkey
- Province: Istanbul
- District: Adalar
- Population (2022): 1,655
- Time zone: UTC+3 (TRT)

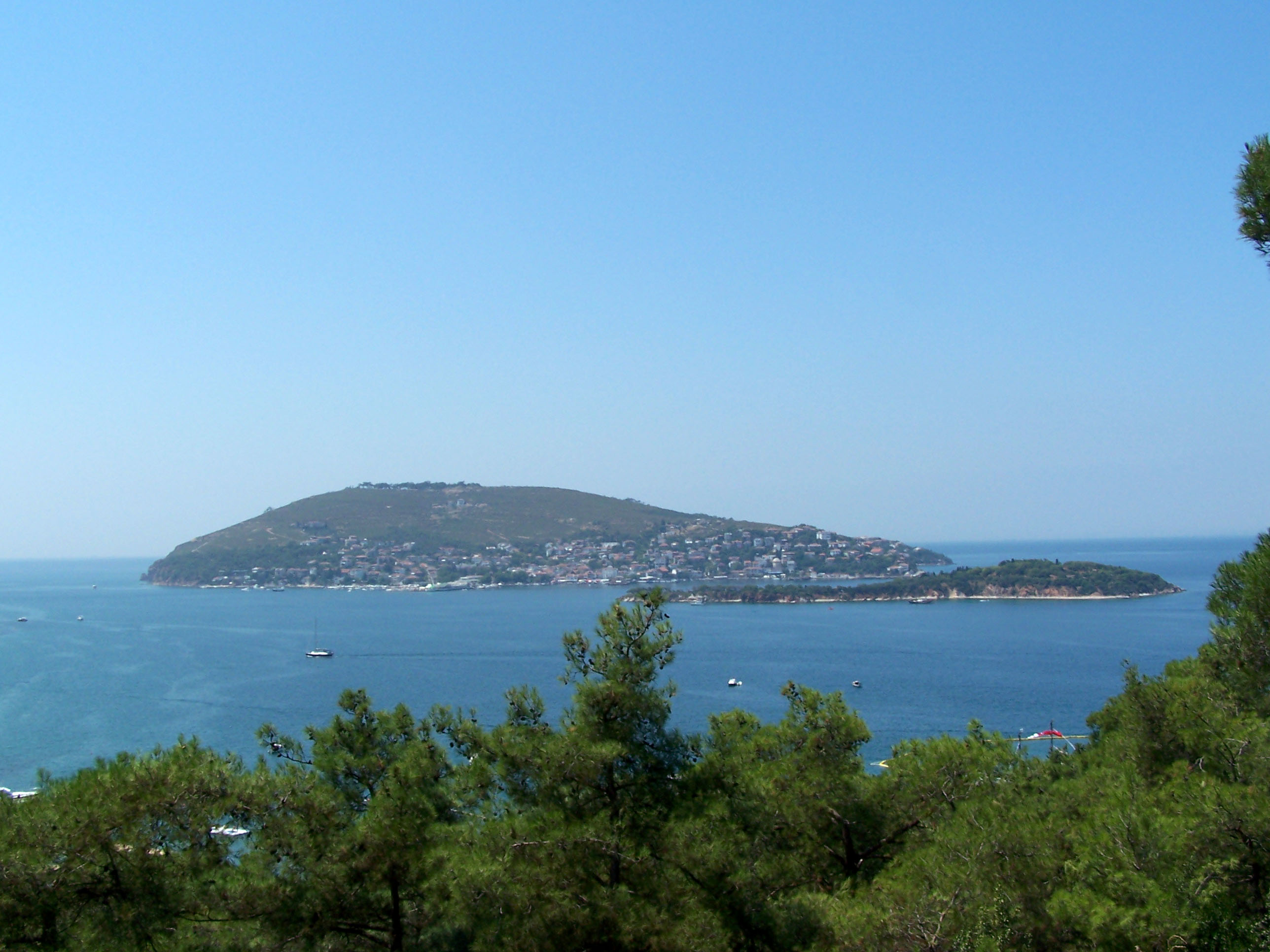
Burgazada seen from Heybeliada

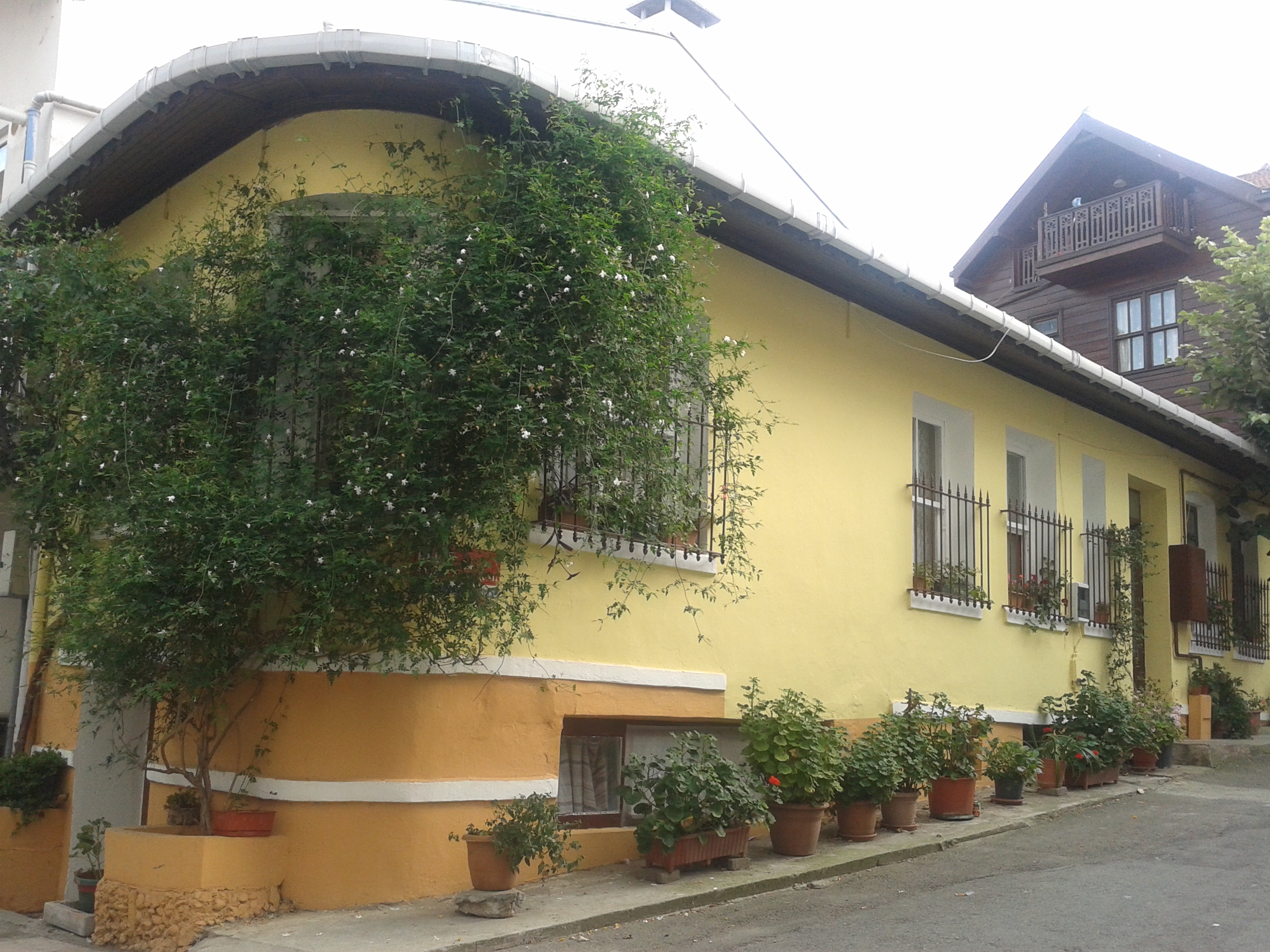
A classic house in Burgazada

Burgazada, or Burgaz Adası (Burgaz for short), is the third largest of the Princes' Islands in the Sea of Marmara, near Istanbul, Turkey. It is officially a neighbourhood in the municipality and district of Adalar, Istanbul Province, Turkey. Its population is 1,655 (2022). In the past, it was called Antigoni (Greek: Ἀντιγόνη) after Antigonus I Monophthalmus, the father of Demetrius I of Macedon, one of the Diadochi (Successors) of Alexander the Great, who built a fort (Greek: Pyrgos for fort/tower) here. The name Burgas is thought to be derived from Pyrgos.

The island covers an area of 1.5 mi^{2} and is dominated by a single hill, Bayraktepe (Flag Hill, 170m/558 ft), also known as Hristos Tepesi (Christ Hill). In 2003, a terrible fire decimated most of its woodland. Visible just offshore is tiny uninhabited Kaşıkadası (Spoon Island). There are great views back towards the mainland from the remote Kalpazankaya ("Counterfeiter's Rock" in Turkish).

Historically, the island was mainly inhabited by Greeks and in the 20th century many Jews from Istanbul settled here. However, with the dwindling of Turkey's minorities, the make-up of the local population is now virtually indistinguishable from the rest of Istanbul.

Şehir Hatları ferries connect the island with the mainland from terminals at Eminönü and Kabataş on the European side of Istanbul and from Kadıköy and Bostancı on the Asian side. Most of the ferries call at Burgaz after Kınalıada and before Heybeliada and Büyükada.

== Attractions ==
The island was home to short-story writer Sait Faik Abasıyanık whose house, originally called Spanudis Mansion, is sometimes open to visitors. Many of Sait Faik's stories are set on Burgazada.

The Church of Iohannes Prodromos (John the Baptist), built in 1899, dominates the small town on the island. It was extensively restored after the Marmara Earthquake of 1999. The site was originally occupied by a Byzantine church which became a prison for St Methodius the Confessor, who was exiled here for his opposition to iconoclasm but eventually went on to become the Greek patriarch.

The Monastery of Hagios Georgios Garipi was largely built in 1897 and had to be extensively restored after the 1999 Marmara Earthquake. In 1917 it served as a refuge for some of the White Russians fleeing the Russian Revolution. There has been a monastery on the site since at least the 17th century.

On the top of Bayraktepe stands the Monastery of the Transfiguration, dating back to Byzantine time and standing on the site of an Ancient Greek temple. The current building is mainly a work of the 19th century.

The Burgazada Sanitorium, founded in 1928, is one of the oldest sanitoria in the country. The site has been unoccupied for quite a time and recently been transformed to a restaurant.

== Notable residents ==
- Sait Faik Abasıyanık
- According to Kōnstantinoupolis, Ottoman Greek publisher Demetrius Nicolaides had a house in Antigone.
- Halide Edıb Adıvar, Turkish writer and politician
- Marko Paşa, Turkish surgeon
- Tilbe Saran (born 1961), Turkish stage actress
- Lale Mansur : Turkish cinema and TV actress
- Halit Refiğ : one of Turkish movie industries most important directors. Deceased 2009
- Prof. Dr. Balkan Naci İslimyeli : Turkish artist and academician. Deceased 2022.
- Necmi Tanyolaç : Sports executive, journalist. Founding member of Turkish Sports Journalist Association (TSYD).
- Ruhi Ayangil : Qanun soloist, Turkish Music conductor and composer.
- Ayla Algan : Turkish stage actress and singer
- Martha Kazar : Known as Madam Martha, her name is given to the cove she swam daily and mostly naked. Of Coptic origin, she was also one the first ballerinas of the newly formed Republic of Turkey.
