= Heybeliada =

Island in Turkey

- Neighbourhood
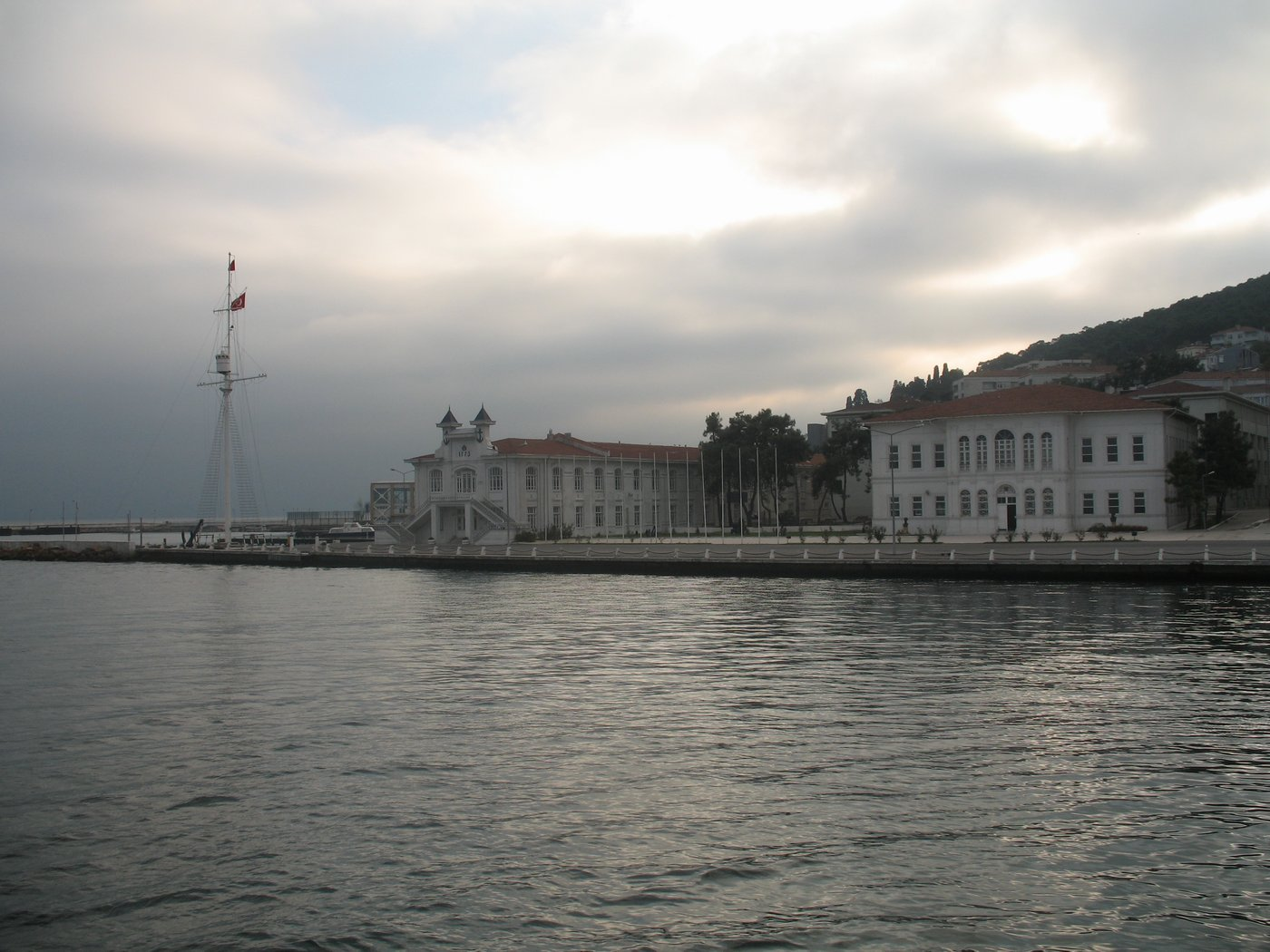
- Naval Cadet School in Heybeliada

- Location within Turkey Location within Istanbul
- Coordinates: 40°52′40″N 29°05′30″E
- Country: Turkey
- Province: Istanbul
- District: Adalar
- Population (2022): 4,424
- Time zone: UTC+3 (TRT)

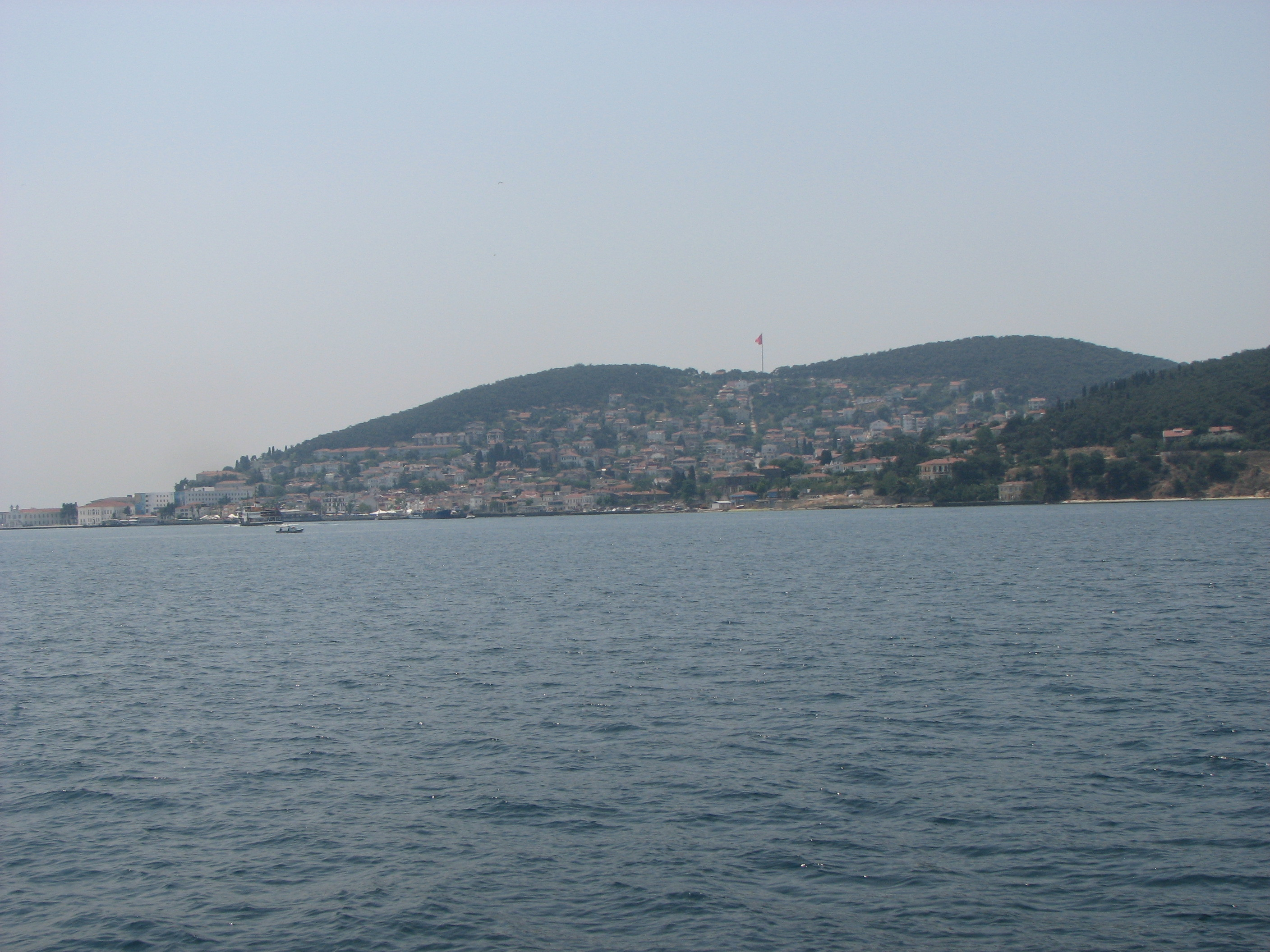
View from north–northeast

Heybeliada, or Heybeli Ada, (Greek: Χάλκη) is the second largest of the Princes' Islands (Adalar) in the Sea of Marmara, near Istanbul, Turkey. It is officially a neighbourhood in the municipality and district of Adalar, Istanbul, Turkey. Its population is 4,424 (2022). Its name, meaning 'with a saddlebag' in Turkish, is supposed to refer to the valley between two hills.

The island was known as Halki, Halkitis (Greek: Χαλκίτις) and Demonesos (Δημόνησος) in antiquity, the first two toponyms deriving from the Greek word halkos (Greek: χαλκός), meaning copper. The island was famous for its copper and copper ores in antiquity.

In winter, the island's population is approximately 4400, but in summer, when owners of summer houses return, the population swells to approximately 30,000.

Launched in 2008, TCG Heybeliada, used by the Turkish Navy is named after the island.

Until 2020, the only vehicles permitted on the island were ambulances, fire tenders, and police vehicles. The only official form of transport was by horse-drawn phaeton. However, as tourism steadily increased, animal rights activists became increasingly concerned about the horses' welfare, and so the phaetons were withdrawn in favour of electric vehicles.

The island is served by Şehir Hatları ferries from Kabataş and Eminönü on the European side of İstanbul and Kadıköy and Bostancı on the Asian side.

== Geography ==
Heybeli only covers 2.35 sqm but has four hills - Ümit Tepesi (Hope Hill, 85m/278 ft), Değirmen Tepesi (Mill Hill, 136m/446 ft), Köy Tepesi (Village Hill, 128m/420 ft) and Baltıcıoğlu Tepes (Woodcutter's Son Hill, 98m/322 ft).

Climate Data

Heybeliada is a place where winters are quite mild. In the coldest month, the day is 9 degrees and the night is 6 degrees, and there is almost no frost throughout the year. The lowest temperature in winter is 0 degrees. This climate supports many tropical plants. Therefore, species such as Bougainvillea, Duranta Erecta, Brugmansia and Canna Indica grow easily on the island. The climate is in the transition zone between Cfa and Csa, as the driest month has 4 days with 26 millimeters of precipitation.

Ort. Sıcaklık (°C)	Min. Sıcaklık (°C)	Maks. Sıcaklık (°C)	
Ocak	7.4	5.7	9.1
Şubat	8.0	6.1	9.9
Mart	8.9	6.5	11.3
Nisan	11.9	8.5	15.3
Mayıs	16.8	13.4	20.2
Haziran	21.5	18.1	24.9
Temmuz	24.2	20.8	27.6
Ağustos	24.5	21.6	27.8
Eylül	20.9	18.3	23.9
Ekim	16.3	14	18.8
Kasım	12.2	9.9	14.5
Aralık	8.9	6.9	11

== Attractions ==
The island's main attractions in summer are small-scale open-air concerts and a swimming and fitness club beside the sea. The annual Independence Day march on 29 October is celebrated by the resident naval band touring the island.

A large Naval High School, originally founded in 1773, overlooks the jetty. In its grounds is Kamariotissa, the only remaining Byzantine church on the island, and, more importantly, the last church to be built before the conquest of Constantinople. It is not open to the public. Also in the grounds is the grave of Edward Barton, the second English Ambassador sent to Constantinople by Elizabeth I of England, who spent his last days on Heybeli to escape an outbreak of plague raging through the city in 1598. His gravestone was later relocated to the British War Graves Cemetery in the Haydarpaşa quarter of Üsküdar.

The monastery of Hagios Georgios tou Kremnou (St George on the Cliff) was founded in the late 16th century and was often used as a haven for the local Greek population when plague hit the mainland. Another monastery, built in the late 19th century and dedicated to Hagios Spyridon, is in ruins.

Mavromatakis Köşkü, a house belonging to İsmet İnönü, the second President of Turkey who was a regular visitor to the island, is sometimes open as a museum.

In the centre of Halki Town is the Greek Orthodox church of Hagios Nikoloas (St Nicholas), built in 1857 on the site of an older Byzantine church. It contains a spring (ayazma) dedicated to Hagia Paraskevi. Nearby are the Ben Yazkor synagogue and Heybeliada Cami, their proximity recalling more cosmopolitan times.

Like Büyükada, Heybeliada has many fine 19th-century mansions especially on Lozan Zeferi and Refah Şehitler Streets. They are all listed in John Freely's book on the islands. Published in 2006 Mary Ann Whitten's book, An Island in Istanbul: At Home on Heybeliada, recounts the story of an American couple who bought one of the old houses to live in.

== The Halki Seminary ==
On Ümit Tepesi (Hope Hill) in the centre of the island is the Greek Orthodox monastery of Hagia Triada (Greek: Μονή Αγίας Τριάδας; "Monastery of the Holy Trinity"). Its origins are shrouded in mystery but it was restored by patriarch Photios I of Constantinople who was buried there in the 9th century. The monastery was destroyed in 1453 but rebuilt and given an extensive library in 1550. It burned down again in 1821, and was finally reconstructed by patriarch Germanus IV of Constantinople in 1844 when it became home to the Halki Theological Seminary (Greek: Ιερά Θεολογική Σχολή της Χάλκης) of the Ecumenical Patriarchate of Constantinople, the main Greek Orthodox seminary in Turkey. In 1894 it was again destroyed, this time by an earthquake, only to be rebuilt two years later by Perikles Photiades.

The Seminary has had a very chequered history and in 1971, parts of Turkey's Private University Law were ruled unconstitutional by the Constitutional Court, forcing all private institutions of higher education to become parts of state universities or close down. Halki's Board of Trustees refused to let it become part of the University of Istanbul so the seminary was shuttered. Its closure made it impossible to train any more Greek Orthodox clergy within Turkey and has proved very controversial, with President Erdoğan suggesting in 2021 that it might be reopened independently if Greece improved conditions for the Turkish Muslim population of Thrace.

== Famous Residents of Heybeliada ==
- İsmet Inönü, second president of Turkey
- Edward Barton, second ambassador of Queen Elizabeth I to Constantinople
- Hüseyin Rahmi Gürpınar, Turkish novelist and politician
- Nicodemus I, patriarch of Jerusalem
- Ahmet Rasım, Turkish writer and historian
- Metrophanes III of Constantinople, Ecumenical Patriarch of Constantinople
