= Abbasid invasions of Asia Minor =

Abbasid invasions of Asia Minor or Abbasid invasions of Anatolia may refer to:

- Abbasid invasion of Asia Minor (779)
- Abbasid invasion of Asia Minor (780)
- Abbasid Invasion of Asia Minor (781)
- Abbasid invasion of Asia Minor (782)
- Abbasid invasion of Asia Minor (788)
- Abbasid invasion of Asia Minor (798)
- Abbasid invasion of Asia Minor (806)
- Abbasid invasion of Asia Minor (831)
- Abbasid invasion of Asia Minor (838)
- Abbasid invasion of Asia Minor (844)
- Abbasid invasion of Asia Minor (862)
