= Abbasid invasion of Asia Minor (780) =

- Part of the Arab–Byzantine wars
- Map of Byzantine Asia Minor and the frontier region with the Abbasid Caliphate c. 780
Date	Summer–September 780
Location	Asia Minor
Result	Byzantine victory

Belligerents
Byzantine Empire	Abbasid Caliphate

Commanders and leaders
Leo IV The Khazar # Michael Lachanodrakon; Tatzates	Al-Mahdi; Harun al-Rashid; Thumama ibn al-Walid; Al-Hasan ibn Qahtaba; Yahya al-Barmaki; Al-Rabi ibn Yunus

Strength
54,000	Approximately 50,000-75,000

Casualties and losses
Unknown	Heavy; western column routed

The Abbasid invasion of Asia Minor c. 780 was a large scale-retaliatory military expedition against the Byzantine Empire, launched by the Abbasid Caliph Al-Mahdi. despite initial success, the campaign ended in a successful Byzantine defense against the second column.

== Background ==
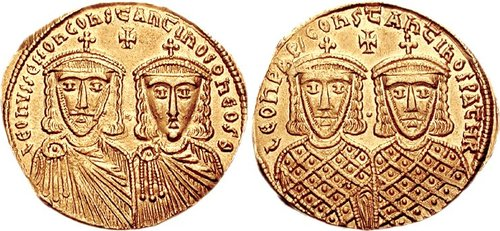
Golden solidus depicting the busts of Emperor Leo IV and Constantine VI, alluding to their ancestors, Leo III and Constantine V

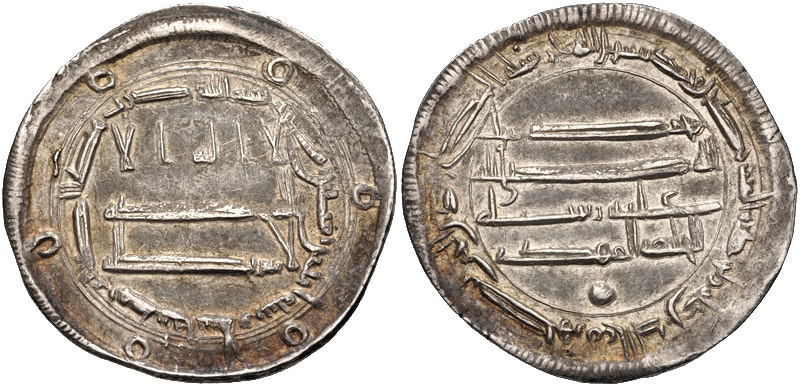
Silver dirham of Caliph Al-Mahdi

Following the ascension of both Emperor Leo IV and Caliph Al-Mahdi in 775, hostilities between Byzantium and the Abbasid Caliphate had resumed. When the new caliph sought to gain prestige by resuming the traditional annual summer raids, which had been in decline under their Umayyad predecessors. In 776, Al-Mahdi lunched his first major military expedition against the Byzantines, which penetrated as far deep as Ancyra, under Thumama ibn al-Walid and his uncle Abbas ibn Muhammad, unsuccessfully besieged the city from 776–777. The following year, Leo IV conducted a major successful counteroffensive that advanced near the city of Germanikeia, which consisted of men drawn from the Thracesian, Anatolic, Bucellarian, Armeniac, and Opsikion themes, under the sole command of his father’s general, Michael Lachanodrakon, accompanied by the strategoi of each theme.

Micheal lifted the siege of the fortress after the caliph’s uncle bribed him. Lachanadrakon's army then raided the surrounding areas near Germanikeia and eventually encountered and defeated a relief army under the command of Thumama, which resulted in the loss of five Emirs. Lachanodrakon would later return his men back home to their Anatolian quarters. In 779, Thumama was again put in charge of the army, however he failed to carry out the expedition. He was replaced by the veteran general Al-Hasan ibn Qahtaba, who crossed the frontier accompanied by Yazid bin Asid Al-Sulami. Their army numbered around at least 30,000 regular troops and jihadist volunteers. They reached as far as the city of Dorylaeum in the Opsikion Theme and put it under siege. Their army lated 15 days, until they ran short on supplies and were forced to lift the siege. The army then tried attacking Amorium but failed and Al-Hasan was forced to abandon the campaign entirely, which infuriated Al-Mahdi, who launched another invasion the following year.

== Invasion ==
Al-Mahdi departed from Baghdad and took personal command of the army. He refortified and repaired several key fortresses and marched to Arabissus, where he left his army under the command of his fourteen-year old son Harun al-rashid, who was accompanied by his mentor Yahya al-Barmaki, and the generals Thumama and Al-Hasan. Harun crossed the border and advanced to the Armeniac Theme, capturing the fortress of Semaluos. The second column under Thumama reached as far as the Thracesian Theme, where he was heavily defeated by Michael Lachanodrakon, killing Thumama’s brother. The remaining Abbasid forces retreated back across the Taurus Mountains around autumn, ending all offensive operations for the rest of year.

== Aftermath ==
In September 780, Leo IV had succumbed to his tuberculosis while preparing to campaign against the First Bulgarian Empire. His wife, Irene of Athens immediately acted as regent for their ten-year old son, Constantine Vl. Undaunted, Al-Mahdi spent the subsequent winter reorganizing to launch another large-scale expedition for the upcoming summer. In the summer of 781, Irene mobilized the Anatolian Themes to guard the mountain passes on the frontier. Sensing political weakness, the Abbasid Caliph al-Mahdi dispatched a force under Abd al-Kabir numbering around 30,000-50,000 men, but they were met and defeated by Byzantine forces near the city of Caesarea by Michael Lachanodrakon, accompanied by Tatzates and John the Sakellarios.
