= Battle of Syca =

Battle during the Arab-Byzantine wars

Battle of Syca (771)
- Part of the Arab-Byzantine wars
- Asia Minor and the Byzantine-Arab frontier c. 780 AD
Date	771
Location	Syca, Mersin Province, Turkey
Result	Abbasid victory

Belligerents
Abbasid Caliphate	Byzantine Empire

Commanders and leaders
Ibn Wakkas	Michael Lachanodrakon; Manes of Bucellarian; Bardanes of Armenia; Petronas of Cibyrrhaeot

Casualties and losses
Unknown	Heavy

The Battle of Syca was a military engagement between the Abbasids and the Byzantine army. The Abbasids launched a raid into the Isaurian city of Syca, but they were surrounded by a Byzantine army. A fierce charge by the Arabs broke the Byzantines and routed them, allowing the Arabs to return home safely.

== Background ==
During the reign of the Byzantine emperor Constantine V, the Islamic world faced internal civil wars between the Umayyad Caliphate and the Abbasid revolt. The Umayyads were overthrown, and the Abbasids came as the new emerging power. Constantine began taking military action against the Arabs. In the year 745, he managed to capture Germanicea, which was his father's birthplace. The next year, the Byzantine fleet won a crushing naval victory against the Arabs near Cyprus. In the year 751, Constantine managed to capture Melitene and Theodosiopolis. The internal struggles in the Islamic world prevented them from retaliating against the Byzantines for several years. However, in 756, the Abbasid Caliph al-Mansur dispatched an army and retook and rebuilt Melitene and Theodosiopolis. The Arabs resumed their attacks on Byzantium and defeated Byzantine armies in 759 and 771.

== Battle ==
In the year 771, after a decade of relative peace, the Abbasids launched a raid against the Byzantine Empire. An Abbasid raiding army led by ibn Wakkas attacked Asia Minor from the south. The Arabs raided Isauria and went to the fortress of Syca; there the Abbasids besieged the fortress. Hearing the news of the Arab raid, the Byzantine emperor, Constantine V, wrote to the strategos of the Anatolic theme, Michael Lachanodrakon, alongside Manes of the Bucellarian, Bardanes of the Armeniac, and Petronas of the Cibyrrhaeot to join forces together and march against the Abbasids in Syca. The Byzantine fleet of the Cibyrrhaeots reached Syca's harbor and anchored there.

Meanwhile, the three main thematic armies, which consisted of cavalry forces, seized the rugged pass, which was the Abbasids' main exit route, thus successfully cutting his escape and trapping him in the defiles. The Abbasid commander lost all hope for himself, but out of desperation, he began encouraging and inspiring his troops to fight back. The Arabs charged at the Byzantine cavalry forces while shouting their war cries, broke through their lines, killing many, and routed them. After their victory the Arabs captured a considerable amount of plunder and began ravaging the countryside. Afterwards, the Arabs returned home safely.

== Aftermath ==
The Byzantine emperor asked for a truce from the Abbasid Caliph al-Mansur but got no results. Constantine would pass away in the year 775.

== Sources ==
- Warren Treadgold (1997), A History of the Byzantine State and Society.
- John Bagnell Bury (1889), A History of the Later Roman Empire from Arcadius to Irene (395 A.D. to 800 A.D.).
- Harry Turtledove (1982), The Chronicle of Theophanes. Anni Mundi 6095-6305 (A.D. 602-813).
- Leif Inge Ree Petersen (2013), Siege Warfare and Military Organization in the Successor States (400-800 AD). Byzantium, the West and Islam.
