= Battle of Caesarea (781) =

Battle during the Arab-Byzantine wars

- Part of the Arab–Byzantine wars
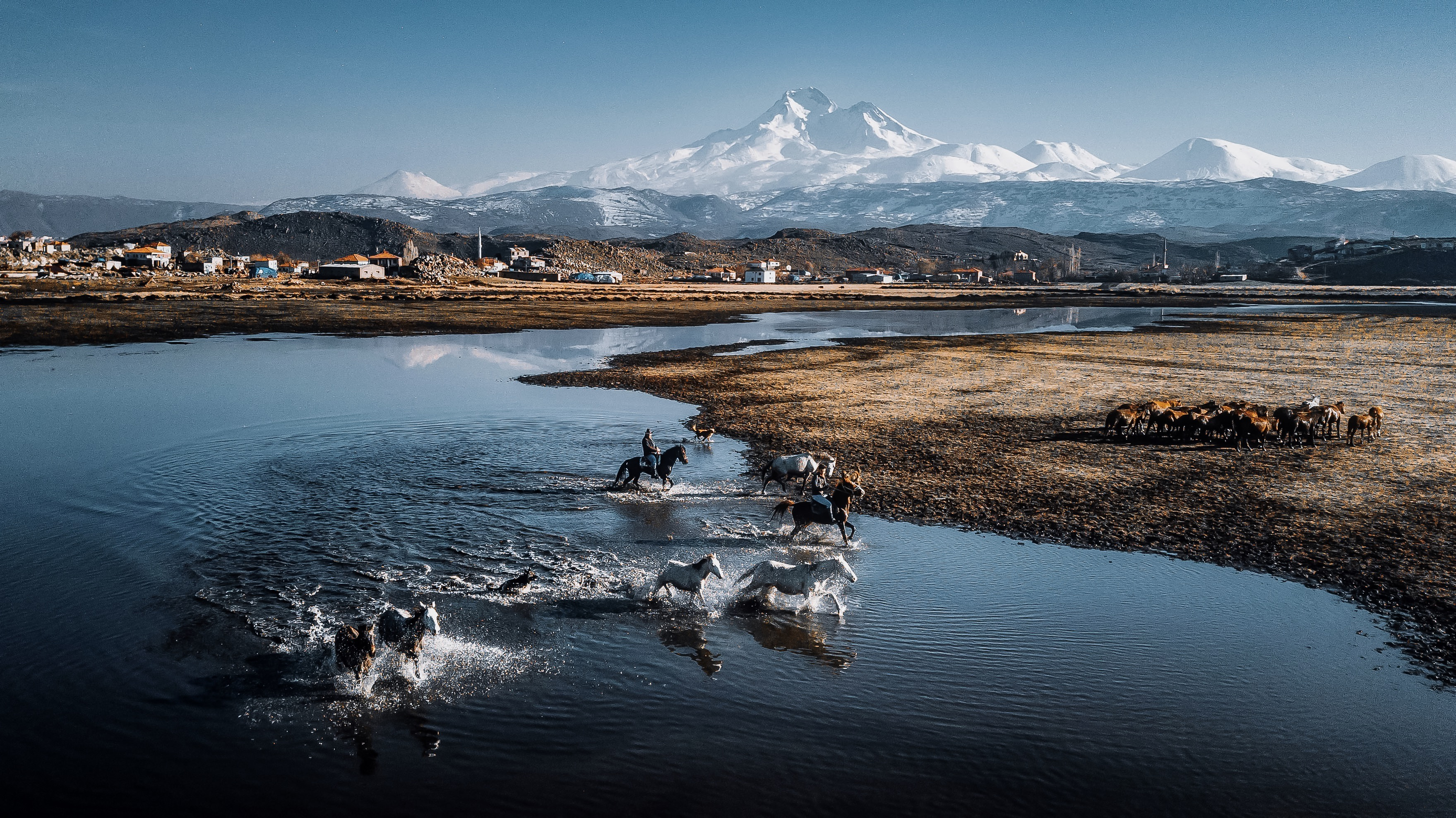
- Modern view of the terrain near Caesarea, with Mount Erciyes visible in the background
Date	June 781 AD
Location	Caesarea (modern Kayseri), Cappadocia
Result	Byzantine victory

Belligerents
Byzantine Empire	Abbasid Caliphate

Commanders and leaders
Michael Lachanodrakon; Tatzates; John the Sakellarios	Abd al-Kabir

Strength
90,000 (Al-Tabari); 40,000–50,000 (modern estimates) (Note: The estimate of the potential number of men the Byzantines could field in Anatolia during this period is given by Treadgold (1988, p.67))	30,000–40,000

The Battle of Caesarea or Battle of Melon was a military engagement fought in 781 in Cappadocia, between the combined thematic forces of the Byzantine Empire and a large Abbasid army. In the pitched battle, the Byzantines were victorious and forced the invading Abbasids to retreat.

== Background ==
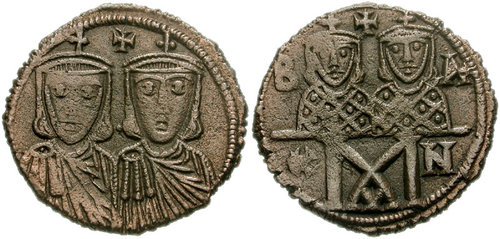
Follis depicting Leo IV and Constantine VI, paralleling them with Leo III and Constantine V

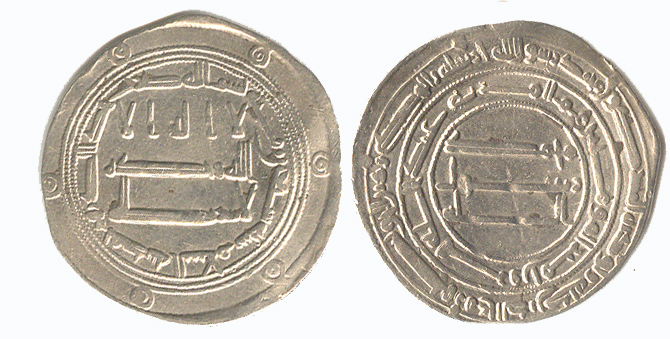
Silver Dirham of Harun al-Rashid

From 777, during the reign of Leo IV, conflict between the Byzantine Empire and the Abbasid Caliphate continued annually with invasions and counter-invasions exchanged between the two sides. The successes of Michael Lachanodrakon during an invasion of Abbasid territory led to a series of large-scale military campaigns by the Caliphate over the following years. In 779 an Abbasid campaign into Asia Minor made little gain due to the Byzantines' effective employment of a Fabian strategy. The following year the Abbasids mounted another massive expedition with an army of over 50,000 men, under the command of Harun al-Rashid and Thumama ibn al-Walid, attacking the Armeniakon Theme. They managed to starve the men defending the fortress of Semalouos into surrender after initial Abbasid efforts to storm the location failed, with lenient terms given to the Byzantine garrison. However, this success was mitigated later in the expedition when troops under the command of Michael Lachanadrakon confronted and defeated a raiding Abbasid army under Thumama, which had reached as far as the Thracesian Theme, with Thumama's brother being killed in the fighting.

Undaunted by their setbacks, the Abbasids prepared to mount another large expedition in 781. They may have considered the prospects of success greater in this year than previously, due to the political weakening of the Byzantines following the death of Leo IV and the regency of his wife, Irene of Athens, on behalf of his underage son, Constantine VI.

== Campaign and Battle ==
In June 781, a massive Arab invasion force of 30,000-50,000 men assembled at Hadath. (Note: The preceding Abbasid expeditions had fielded armies from 30,000 to 50,000 strong, with the campaigning force in 781 also described as being particularly large by Theophanes (Treadgold 1988 p.34 & Howard-Johnston 2015 p.482)) This army, under the command of Abd al-Kabir, crossed the Taurus mountains, through the pass of Adata and deep into Anatolia, where they were confronted by the forces of Michael Lachanodrakon. Theophanes the Confessor recorded that the name of the location at which the two sides met was Melon, which historian Warren Treadgold identified to be a place near the city of Caesarea. (Note: Theophanes serves as the main primary source on the battle. The later Persian historian Al-Tabari omitted mention of a defeat in his writing on the campaign, but described an impromptu Abbasid withdrawal from Anatolia)

The Byzantines assembled a powerful force consisting of men drawn from all the Asian themes, with both Lachanodrakon having brought the Thracesians under his command and Tatzates leading the Bucellarians as the strategos of that theme. Al-Tabari describes the figure of 90,000 men in the Byzantine army opposing the Abbasids at this time, but modern historians consider such a figure to be inflated. Nevertheless, the assembled thematic army was significant in number, possibly up to 50,000 men. Abd al-Kabir arrayed his troops and advanced to engage the Byzantines but suffered a defeat with heavy casualties in the ensuing battle and was forced to withdraw with the remainder of his army. Treadgold has criticised Al-Kabir's decision to engage the Byzantines in these circumstances, and his poor performance enraged Caliph Al-Mahdi, who imprisoned his defeated commander after being persuaded not to execute him, as he initially intended.

== Aftermath ==
The defeat of the Abbasids in 781 prompted an extraordinary response by Al-Mahdi in the next year. Assembling the largest army of his reign, Al-Mahdi appointed his second son and future Caliph Harun to lead it against the Byzantines. Likely influenced by the lack of success of the preceding Abbasid campaigns through the pass of Adata, Harun took a different route through the Cilician Gates to surprise the thematic forces. In the following expedition, after grueling combat, the Abbasids were able to impose a tribute on the Byzantines.

== Bibliography ==
- Treadgold, Warren (1988). The Byzantine Revival, 780–842.
- McMahon, Lucas (2015). The past and future of De Velitatione Bellica and Byzantine Guerrilla Warfare (PDF). Budapest, Hungary: Central European University.
- Turtledove, Harry (1982). 'The Chronicle of Theophanes' An English translation of anni mundi 6095-6305 (a.p. 602-813), with introduction and notes. Philadelphia: University of Pennsylvania Press. ISBN 0-8122-7842-9.
- Howard-Johnston, James (2015). "Theophanes on the Recent Past: The Crisis of 782 and Its Antecedents". Studies in Theophanes. Travaux et mémoires. Vol. 19. Paris: Association des Amis du Centre d’Histoire et Civilisation de Byzance.
