= Abbasid invasion of Asia Minor (779) =

Failed campaign against the Byzantines

- Part of the Arab–Byzantine wars
- Map of Byzantine Asia Minor and the Byzantine-Arab frontier region c. 780
Date	Summer 779
Location	Asia minor, Cilicia
Result	Byzantine victory

Belligerents
Byzantine Empire	Abbasid Caliphate

Commanders and leaders
Leo IV the Khazar; Michael Lachanodrakon; Niketas; Artavabas	Al-Mahdi; Thumama ibn al-Walid (until late summer) Hasan ibn Qahtaba; Yazid bin Asid Al-Sulami

Strength
15,000 elite thematic troops	30,000 regular troops Unknown number of jihadist volunteers

The Abbasid invasion of Asia Minor in 779 AD was a large retaliatory summer expedition launched by the Abbasid Caliphate against the Byzantine Empire, for military setbacks in previous years. The campaign was marked by effective use of scorched earth and Fabian strategies by the Byzantines, by order of the Emperor Leo IV, in stopping the efforts of the Abbasid army to capture major settlements.

== Background ==
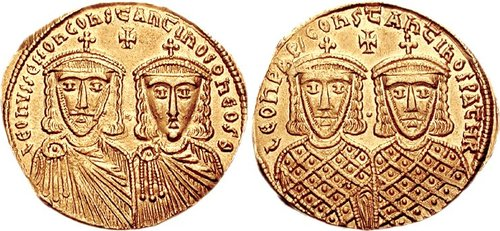
Gold solidus of Leo IV, also depicting Constantine VI, as well as their ancestors Leo III the Isaurian and Constantine V

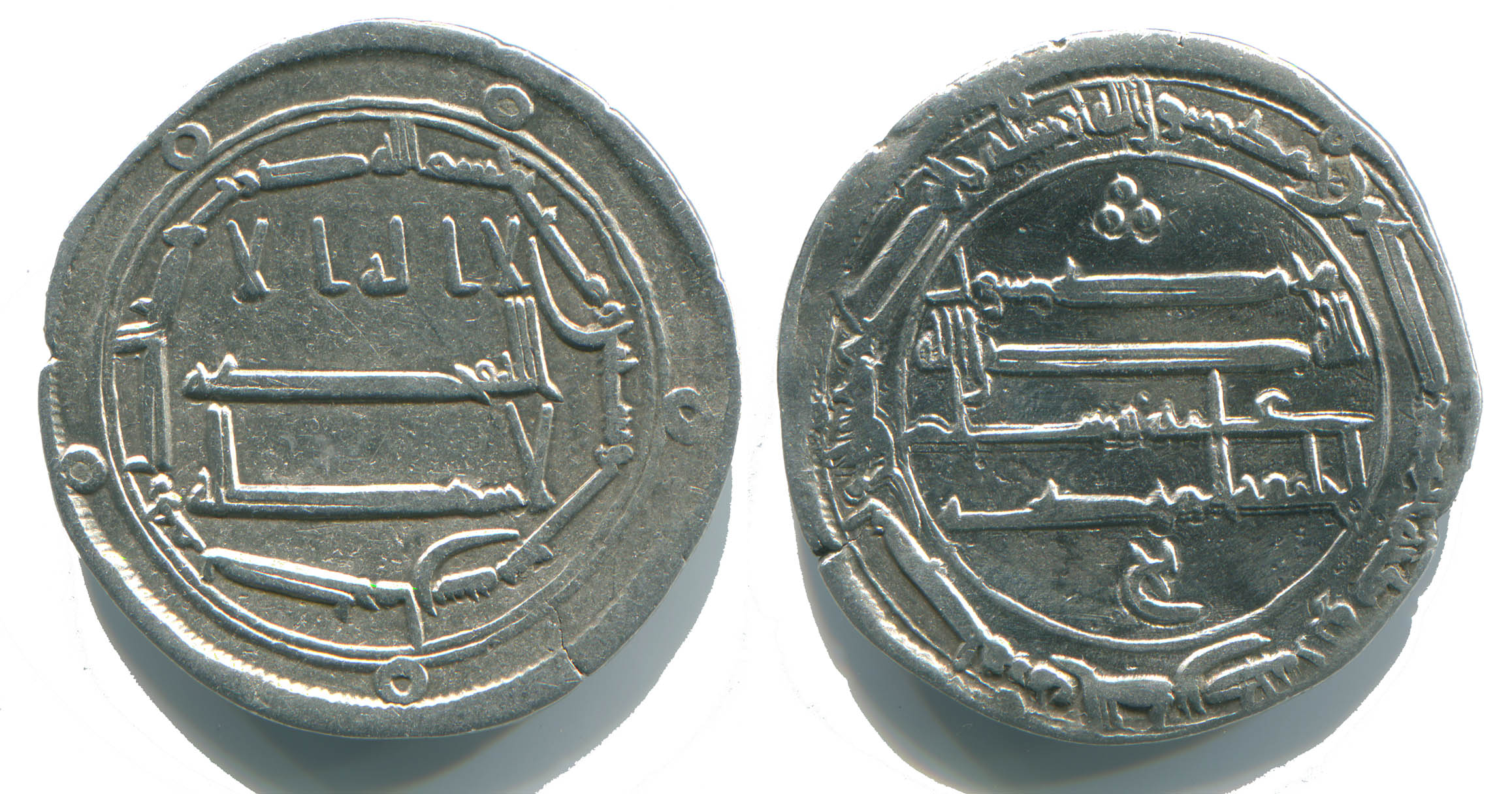
Silver dirham of al-Mahdi

In response to the successes achieved by the Byzantines during their campaign near Germanikeia in 778, the Caliph al-Mahdi intensified efforts to conduct a large-scale invasion into Asia Minor in retaliation. Before the end of 778, an Abbasid army was defeated by Michael Lachanodrakon during its attempted invasion of Anatolia, which further aggravated the need for a large-scale Abbasid military response.

In 779 the Abbasid general Thumama ibn al-Walid was replaced as master of the forthcoming expedition with the veteran commander Hasan ibn Qahtaba. Hassan took over preparations to assemble a major force for the campaign, and by summer 779 he had assembled an army consisting of 30,000 Abbasid regular soldiers, which was bolstered further by an unknown quantity of volunteer jihadist warriors. As part of a pronged offensive strategy, a second and presumably smaller Abbasid army was prepared to advance against the Armeniakon Theme from the direction of Theodosiopolis, under the command of Yazid bin Asid Al-Sulami.

== Campaign ==
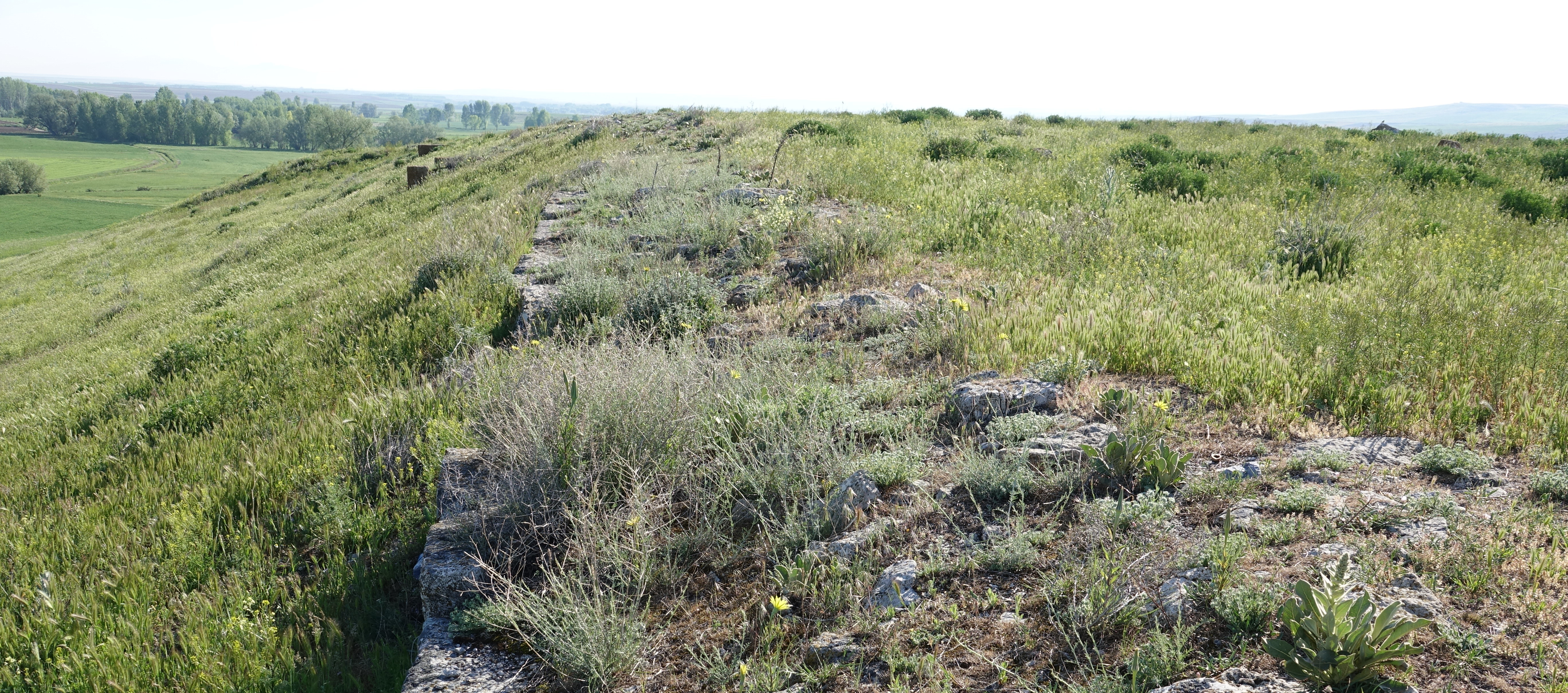
Ruins of the walls of Amorium

Cautious of the large Abbasid army entering Anatolia, Leo IV ordered his strategoi to avoid meeting the enemy in set-piece battles. Instead, they were to conduct a scorched earth policy on the Anatolian pastures to deny the animals of Hasan's army sustenance. The Byzantine strategoi were instructed to divide their forces into separate thematic detachments of elite troops of 3,000 men each, in order to shadow the Abbasid army and only engage small contingents, which separated from Hasan's main army to raid or forage for supplies.

Hasan's column advanced through Cappadocia with little opposition until it reached the city of Dorylaeum in the Opsikion Theme and put it under siege. However as part of the defensive strategy, Byzantine officers had reinforced the garrison of Dorylaeum with additional men and logistics. They also oversaw the evacuation of non-combatant civilians, so that these would not exhaust the defenders' supplies. Hasan's men encamped and blockaded the city for 15 days, but because of Byzantine Fabian tactics, the Abbasids ran low on supplies and they were forced to lift siege. On the way back from Dorylaeum, Hasan's army conducted an attack on Amorium. As the city had also been reinforced on the Emperor's orders, its garrison also repulsed the Abbasids.

The northern Abbasid column under Yazid advanced through the pass at Qaliqala into Byzantine territory, wherein they appear to have achieved limited success. According to Al-Tabari, Yazid's troops pillaged three settlements and took many captives, though the Armenian historian Łewond recorded that this army sustained defeats and attained minimal success. Abbasid fortunes in 779 were further deteriorated by a significant reversal further south along the Al-Awasim. Exploiting the lack of Abbasid activity after the withdrawal of Hasan's army, the Byzantines launched a counteroffensive into Abbasid Cilicia, as they had previously done in 778, targeting the Abbasid base at Hadath. The Byzantines captured the fortress city in 779 and demolished its fortifications.

== Aftermath ==
Following the defeat at Hadath, Al-Mahdi travelled from Baghdad and marched via Aleppo to the fortress, which he refortified and repaired. He then marched to Arabissus, where he left his army and returned to Baghdad, entrusting the army to his son and future caliph Harun. In 780 Harun led a division in person to raid the Armeniac Theme and took the fortress of Semaluos, while the other half of the Abbasid army under the reappointed Thumama raided as far as the Thracesian Theme, until his forces were confronted and heavily defeated by Michael Lachanodrakon. The war nonetheless continued beyond the death of Leo IV into the regency of Irene of Athens, with the Abbasids conducting further major expeditions in 781 and 782.

== Bibliography ==
- Treadgold, Warren (1988). The Byzantine Revival, 780–842.
- Howard-Johnston, James (2015). "Theophanes on the Recent Past: The Crisis of 782 and Its Antecedents". Studies in Theophanes. Travaux et mémoires. Vol. 19. Paris: Association des Amis du Centre d’Histoire et Civilisation de Byzance.
- Turtledove, Harry (1982). 'The Chronicle of Theophanes' An English translation of anni mundi 6095-6305 (a.p. 602-813), with introduction and notes. Philadelphia: University of Pennsylvania Press. ISBN 0-8122-7842-9.
- McMahon, Lucas (2015). The past and future of De Velitatione Bellica and Byzantine Guerrilla Warfare (PDF). Budapest, Hungary: Central European University.
