= Siege of Ancyra (776–777) =

Unsuccessful Arab attempt to capture the Byzantine city of Ancyra

- Part of the Arab–Byzantine wars
Date	776–777 AD
Location	modern-day Ankara
Result	Byzantine victory

Belligerents
Byzantine Empire	Abbasid Caliphate

Commanders and leaders
Unknown	Thumama ibn al-Walid Abbas ibn Muhammad (Uncle of al-Mahdi)

The Siege of Ancyra was an unsuccessful Arab attempt to capture the Byzantine city of Ancyra in the heartland of Asia Minor by the Abbasid Caliphate during the Arab-Byzantine wars.

== Background ==
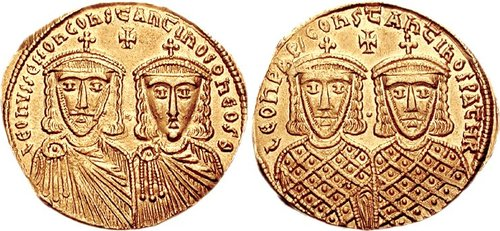
Solidus depicting Emperor Leo IV the Khazar and Constantine VI, paralleling them with Leo III and Constantine V

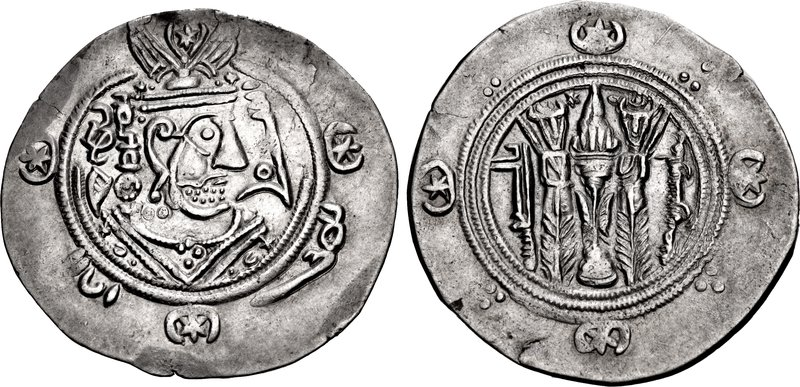
Sasanian-inspired dirham of Caliph Al-Mahdi

In 775, both empires underwent a leadership change. Caliph Al-Mansur and Emperor Constantine V died within months of each other. Their successors, Al-Mahdi and Leo IV, were eager to prove their military mettle. Leo dispatched an envoy named Tarath to Baghdad to congratulate the new caliph, who sought to revive the traditional annual summer raids (ṣawā’if) to gain prestige. Both the emperor and the caliph likely sought to gain prestige via military success in order to secure their respective positions.

Caliph Al-Mahdi himself conducted an expedition into Anatolia in early 776, renewing the conflict between the two polities. In the summer of 776, Leo ordered an invasion into Abbasid territory, dispatching forces eastward to initiate the operation. This army gained victories, pillaging far and wide and taking many prisoners. The crowning achievement of the campaign was the siege and capture of Samosata, an important Abbasid stronghold along the Al-Awasim. These Byzantine successes prompted a retaliatory invasion of Anatolia by the Abbasids, who prepared an expedition that would be led by Thumama ibn al-Walid in late 776.

== Siege ==
Before initiating the invasion, Thumama's army had been reinforced with men and officers from Abbasid Khorasan. Having thus been strengthened, Thumama marched into Asia Minor. His campaign gained initial success when his army succeeded in capturing civilians who had tried to take refuge in underground shelters, using fire and smoke to force the people out of these.

Thumama continued through Cappadocia and penetrated as far west as Ancyra. There, he invested the city in a siege. However, he was unable to breach the defenses and ultimately the siege ended in failure. The Abbasids eventually lifted the siege, returning to their own territory in early 777.

== Aftermath ==
The following year in 778, the Byzantines retaliated and launched a major counteroffensive under the personal command of Michael Lachanodrakon, in a massive Byzantine thematic coalition army that overran northern Syria, famously defeating an Abbasid relief force after initially besieging the city at Germanikeia.

== Bibliography ==
- Treadgold, Warren (1997). A History of the Byzantine State and Society. Stanford, California: Stanford University Press. ISBN 0-8047-2630-2.
- Warren Treadgold (1988), The Byzantine revival, 780–842.
- Howard-Johnston, James. "Theophanes on the Recent Past: The Crisis of 782 and Its Antecedents". Studies in Theophanes. Travaux et mémoires. Vol. 19. Association des Amis du Centre d’Histoire et Civilisation de Byzance.
- Kaegi, Walter E. (2008). "Confronting Islam: Emperors versus Caliphs (641–c. 850)". In Shepard, Jonathan (ed.). The Cambridge history of the Byzantine Empire (c. 500–1492). Cambridge University Press. ISBN 978-0-521-83231-1.
