= Andzevatsik =

Region of ancient Armenia

Coordinates: 38°01′08″N 43°41′47″E

Andzevatsik (in Armenian: Անձևացիք, Anjewacʼikʼ) was a region of ancient and medieval Armenia c. 400–800 in the South-East of Vaspurakan, ruled by the Antzevatsi family.

Andzevatsik was the eleventh ghavar (region) of the province of Vaspurakan of Great Armenia. There were 3 fortified cities in the region: Alaman, Mihravan and Ahzi. Bordered in the south with the province of Korchayk. In the region there was a significant monastery of Hogyats and Kangavar fortress.

Andzevatsik was one of the nine main principalities of Greater Armenia, which did not allow the Sassanids to advance their borders, and the borders of their vassals (Iveria and Albania), further into the interior of Armenia, after the partition of the Armenian kingdom in 387 between the Sassanid and the Roman Empire.

The Armenian princely family of Andzevatsi owned five ghavaras (regions) of the province (ashkhar) of Vaspurakan south of Lake Van (Tosp). Anzevaci descended from the kings of Hubushkia. Princely clan of Andzevatsi put forward a number of prominent nakharars (Tachat Andzevatsi were presiding prince of the Emirate of Armenia) and church leaders (Khosrov Andzevatsi). After the gradual ruin and weakening of this princely clan as a result of wars and uprisings, the princely clan of Artsruni took possession of their lands.

== See also ==
- List of regions of ancient Armenia
