= Ake (disambiguation) =

Ake is an archaeological site of the pre-Columbian Maya civilization, located in the state of Yucatán, Mexico.

Ake or AKE may also refer to:

== Places ==
- Ake Site, archaeological site near the town of Datil, New Mexico, US
- Principality of Ake, medieval dynasty in central Kurdistan
- Ake (Ἄκη), classical Greek name of Acre, Israel

== People ==
=== Given name ===
- Åke, a given name, origin and list of people with the first name "Åke"
- A'ke, a fictional character in The Deer and the Cauldron

=== Surname ===
- Claude Ake (1939–1996), Nigerian political scientist
- Godspower Ake (1940–2016), Nigerian politician
- Wilson Asinobi Ake, member of the Senate of Nigeria
- Nathan Aké, (born 1995), Dutch footballer, currently playing for Manchester City
- Simeon Aké, (1932–2009), Ivorian politician
- Ibra Ake, Nigerian-American artist

== Abbreviations ==
- Authenticated Key Exchange, in cryptography

== Other uses ==
- Ake language
- Ake and His World, children's fiction book by Swedish poet Bertil Malmberg, published in 1924
- Aké: The Years of Childhood, a 1981 memoir by Nigerian Nobel Laureate Wole Soyinka
- Aké Arts and Book Festival, an annual cultural event named after the town in Abeokuta, Nigeria, where Wole Soyinka was born
- Ake v. Oklahoma, US Supreme Court case that held an indigent criminal defendant has a right to have the state provide a psychiatric evaluation to be used in the defendant's behalf if the defendant needs it
- A US Navy hull classification symbol: Advanced auxiliary dry cargo ship (AKE)
- An IATA prefix for an LD3 unit load device

== See also ==
- Akçe, an Ottoman coin
- Ackee, a fruit popular in Jamaican cuisine
