= Battle of Melas River =

Battle during the Arab-Byzantine wars

Battle of Melas River (759)
- Part of the Arab-Byzantine wars
- Asia Minor and the Byzantine-Arab frontier c. 780 AD
Date	759
Location	Near Caesarea (modern Kayseri), Cappadocia
Result	Abbasid victory

Belligerents
Abbasid Caliphate	Byzantine Empire

Commanders and leaders
Al-Abbas bin Muhammad	Paul the Armeniac †

Casualties and losses
Unknown	Many killed and captured 42 high-ranking officers captured

The Battle of Melas River was a military engagement between the Abbasid and Byzantine armies near the Melas River in the region of Caesarea. The Arabs raided the Armeniac theme and defeated a Byzantine army there, inflicting heavy losses.

== Background ==
During the reign of the Byzantine emperor Constantine V, the Islamic world faced internal civil wars between the Umayyad Caliphate and the Abbasid revolt. The Umayyads were overthrown, and the Abbasids came as the new emerging power. Constantine began taking military action against the Arabs. In the year 745, he managed to capture Germanicea, which was his father's birthplace. The next year, the Byzantine fleet won a crushing naval victory against the Arabs near Cyprus. In the year 751, Constantine managed to capture Melitene and Theodosiopolis. The internal struggles in the Islamic world prevented them from retaliating against the Byzantines for several years. However, in 756, the Abbasid Caliph al-Mansur dispatched an army and retook and rebuilt Melitene and Theodosiopolis. The Arabs resumed their attacks on Byzantium.

== Battle ==
In the year 759, while Constantine was fighting the Bulgarians, the Arabs led by the Caliph's brother al-Abbas bin Muhammad launched a raid against Asia Minor. They penetrated the Armenian theme and began ravaging and capturing many prisoners. The strategos of the theme called Paul intercepted the Arabs at the Melas River located in the region of Caesarea. The Byzantine army was defeated with heavy losses, and Paul was killed during the battle. The Arabs captured immense booty and prisoners, including 42 high-ranking officers.

== Aftermath ==
The defeat forced Constantine to make a truce with the Bulgarians. Constantine did not intervene or retaliate to avenge his defeat and, in turn, arranged for a truce with the Muslims. The warfare turned into a series of border battles between the two empires, and later both were occupied with internal conflicts. until the next major conflict in 766.

== Sources ==
- John Bagnell Bury (1889), A History of the Later Roman Empire from Arcadius to Irene (395 A.D. to 800 A.D.).
- Harry Turtledove (1982), The Chronicle of Theophanes. Anni Mundi 6095-6305 (A.D. 602-813).
- T. Venning (2006), A Chronology of the Byzantine Empire.
- Alfred Lombard (1902), Constantine V, Emperor of the Romans: (740-775): studies in Byzantine history (In French).
- Warren Treadgold (1997), A History of the Byzantine State and Society.
