= Abbasid invasion of Asia Minor (798) =

798 Abbasid invasion of the Byzantine Empire

- Part of the Arab–Byzantine wars
- Map of Byzantine Asia Minor and the Byzantine-Arab frontier region c. 780
Date	September 798
Location	Asia Minor
Result	Abbasid victory

Belligerents
Abbasid Caliphate	Byzantine Empire

Commanders and leaders
Harun al-Rashid; Abd al-Malik ibn Salih; Abd al-Rahman	Empress Irene; Paul the Patrician

The Abbasid invasion of Asia Minor of 798 was a military expedition dispatched by the Abbasid Caliph Harun al-Rashid against the Byzantine Empire. The expedition was the largest since the expedition of 782. The Abbasid army raided the Opsikion and Thracesian themes, gaining immense loot and defeating a Byzantine army. The expedition forced the Byzantine empress Irene of Athens to sign a peace treaty and payment of tribute.

== Background ==
In the year 797, Byzantium was occupied with dynastic conflicts. The Byzantine empress, Irene of Athens, first had a problem dealing with the Abbasid large raid that her partisans caused by sabotaging her son's campaign. The Abbasid Caliph Harun al-Rashid placed Abd al-Malik ibn Salih, a prominent Abbasid dynasty member, as the leader of the expedition. Abd al-Malik has shown enthusiasm in raiding the Byzantines. He had already led raids against them from 790 to 793. His forces spread over the Anatolic and Bucellarian themes. Irene sought a truce, dispatching two clerics, Dorotheos, abbot of Chrysopolis, and cartophylax Constantine, with a proposal of peace. This embassy failed. Afterwards, Irene dispatched a general called Aetius, who scored some success but failed to stop the Arabs' eagerness for raiding.

== Expedition ==
In September 798, the Abbasids sensed the weakness of the Byzantines and launched a new raid. Led by Abd al-Malik and his son Abd al-Rahman. The Abbasid forces penetrated deep into Anatolia. Once inside, the Abbasids divided their forces into two. The smaller force was led by Abd al-Rahman, who raided Ephesus in the Thracesian theme, taking a large number of captives and loot in an area where no army had raided for years. The main force was led by Abd al-Malik himself, who raided the Opsikion theme. There the Abbasid forces seized the imperial stables. at Malagina. They captured Staurakios' horses and Irene's carriage. Others raided the Monastery of Saccadium's territory, where many people fled to Constantinople. A Byzantine army of the Opsikion theme led by the count, Paul the Patrician, intercepted the Arabs but was defeated with heavy losses. The Abbasids captured their baggage and added it to their loot. Both armies reunited and returned home safely with a large amount of booty.

== Aftermath ==
The expedition of 798 was the largest and most destructive since Harun al-Rashid's expedition of 782. Irene was forced to conclude a four-year peace treaty with the Abbasids. She dispatched Bishop Euthymius of Sardis. A peace treaty was signed with terms similar to those in 782. The Byzantines would pay a sum of 160,000 nomismata. Despite the defeat, Byzantium suffered no major territory losses under Irene.

== Sources ==
- Warren Treadgold (1988), The Byzantine revival, 780-842.
- Lynda Garland (2002), Byzantine Empresses. Women and Power in Byzantium AD 527-1204.
- John Haldon (2017), Byzantine Warfare.
- Stephen Mitchell (1981), Armies and Frontiers in Roman and Byzantine Anatolia.
