= Abbasid invasion of Asia Minor (782) =

782 Abbasid invasion of the Byzantine Empire

- Part of the Arab–Byzantine wars
- Map of Byzantine Asia Minor and the Byzantine-Arab frontier region c. 780
| Date | Spring–summer 782 |
| Location | Asia Minor |
| Result | Abbasid victory |

Belligerents
| Abbasid Caliphate | Byzantine Empire |

Commanders and leaders
| Al-Mahdi; Harun al-Rashid al-Rabi' ibn Yunus; Al-Barmaki; Yazid ibn Mazyad al-Shaybani | Empress Irene; Staurakios; Michael Lachanodrakon; Tatzates; Anthony the Domestic |

Strength
| 95,793 (Al-Tabari) | 70,000 (Niketas Choniates) |

Casualties and losses
| Moderate | 56,090 (al-Tabari) |

The Abbasid invasion of Asia Minor in 782 was one of the largest operations launched by the Abbasid Caliphate against the Byzantine Empire. The invasion was launched as a display of Abbasid military might in the aftermath of a series of Byzantine successes. Commanded by the Abbasid heir-apparent, the future Harun al-Rashid, the Abbasid army reached as far as Chrysopolis, across the Bosporus from the Byzantine capital, Constantinople, while secondary forces raided western Asia Minor and defeated the Byzantine forces there. As Harun did not intend to assault Constantinople and lacked ships to do so, he turned back.

The Byzantines, who in the meantime had neutralized the detachment left to secure the Abbasid army's rear in Phrygia, were able to trap Harun's army between their own converging forces. The defection of the Armenian general Tatzates, however, allowed Harun to regain the upper hand. The Abbasid prince sent for a truce and detained the high-ranking Byzantine envoys, who included Empress Irene's chief minister, Staurakios. This forced Irene to agree to a three-year truce and pay a heavy annual tribute. Irene then focused her attention to the Balkans, but warfare with the Arabs resumed in 786, until mounting Arab pressure led to another truce in 798, on terms similar to those of 782.

== Background ==
Taking advantage of the internal difficulties of the Umayyad Caliphate that resulted from the civil wars of the 740s and the subsequent Abbasid Revolution, the Byzantines under Emperor Constantine V (r. 741–775) were able to regain the initiative on their eastern borders from the Arabs, and pursued an aggressive strategy. With the gradual consolidation of the Abbasid regime in the 760s and 770s, the situation became more balanced: the Arabs resumed their large-scale raids deep into Asia Minor, although the Byzantines were still capable of major counterstrikes. Thus in 778, the Byzantines, under Michael Lachanodrakon, seized the town of Germanikeia (Ma'rash), where they captured significant amounts of booty and took many Syrian Christians captive, and defeated an army sent against them by the Abbasid general Thumama ibn al-Walid. In the next year, the Byzantines took and razed the fortress city of Hadath, forcing Caliph al-Mahdi (r. 775–785) to replace the rather passive Thumama with the veteran al-Hasan ibn Qahtaba. Hasan led over 30,000 troops in an invasion of Byzantine territory, but the Byzantines offered no opposition and withdrew to well-fortified towns and refuges, until a lack of supplies forced Hasan to return home without achieving much.

In response to these Byzantine successes, Caliph al-Mahdi now resolved to take the field in person. On 12 March 780, Mahdi departed Baghdad and via Aleppo marched to Hadath, which he refortified. He then advanced to Arabissus, where he left the army and returned to Baghdad. His son and heir Harun—better known by his laqab, or regnal name, al-Rashid—was left in charge of one half of the army, which raided the Armeniac Theme and took the small fort of Semaluos. Thumama, who had been entrusted with the other half, penetrated deeper into Asia Minor. He marched west as far as the Thracesian Theme, but was heavily defeated there by Lachanodrakon. In June 781, as the Arab invasion force assembled at Hadath under Abd al-Kabir, a great-great-nephew of the Caliph Umar (r. 634–644), and again prepared to launch their annual raid, Empress Irene called up the thematic armies of Asia Minor and placed them under the eunuch sakellarios John. (Note: John was killed during the Byzantine expedition to Calabria in 788.) The Muslims crossed into Byzantine Cappadocia over the Pass of Hadath, and were met near Caesarea by the combined Byzantine forces under Lachanodrakon. The ensuing battle resulted in a costly Arab defeat, forcing Abd al-Kabir to abandon his campaign and retreat to Syria.

This defeat infuriated the Caliph, who prepared a new expedition. Intended as a show of force and a clear display of the Caliphate's superiority, (Note: In contrast with their Umayyad predecessors, the Abbasid caliphs pursued a conservative foreign policy. In general terms, they were content with the territorial limits achieved, and whatever external campaigns they waged were retaliatory or pre-emptive, meant to preserve their frontier and impress Abbasid might upon their neighbours. At the same time, the campaigns against Byzantium in particular were important for domestic consumption. The annual raids were a symbol of the continuing jihad of the early Muslim state and were the only external expeditions where the Caliph or his sons participated in person. They were closely paralleled in official propaganda by the leadership by Abbasid family members of the annual pilgrimage (hajj) to Mecca, highlighting the dynasty's leading role in the religious life of the Muslim community. Harun al-Rashid in particular actively strove to embody this duty: he was said to have alternated between leading the hajj one year and attacking Byzantium the next. The hitherto unseen extent of his personal involvement in the jihad converted it into a central tenet of his conception of the caliphate, leading modern historians to consider Harun as the creator of a new type of model ruler, the "ghazi-caliph".) it was the largest army sent against Byzantium in the second half of the 8th century: it allegedly comprised 95,793 men, about twice the total Byzantine military establishment present in Asia Minor, and cost the Abbasid state some 1.6 million nomismata, almost as much as the Byzantine Empire's entire annual income. Harun was the nominal leader, but the Caliph took care to send experienced officers to accompany him.

== Campaign ==
On 9 February 782, Harun departed Baghdad; the Arabs crossed the Taurus Mountains by the Cilician Gates, and swiftly took the border fortress of Magida. They then advanced along the military roads across the plateau into Phrygia. There, Harun left his lieutenant, the hadjib al-Rabi' ibn Yunus, to besiege Nakoleia and guard his rear, while another force, reportedly 30,000 men, under al-Barmaki (an unspecified member of the powerful Barmakid family, probably Yahya ibn Khalid), was sent to raid the rich western coastlands of Asia Minor. Harun himself, with the main army, advanced to the Opsician Theme. The accounts of subsequent events in the primary sources (Theophanes the Confessor, Michael the Syrian, and al-Tabari) differ on the details, but the general course of the campaign can be reconstructed.

According to Warren Treadgold, the Byzantine effort seems to have been led by Irene's chief minister, the eunuch Staurakios, whose strategy was to avoid an immediate confrontation with Harun's huge army, but wait until it had split up and advanced to meet its various detachments independently. The Thracesians under Lachanodrakon confronted al-Barmaki at a place called Darenos, but were defeated and suffered heavy losses (15,000 men according to Theophanes, 10,000 according to Michael the Syrian). The outcome of al-Rabi's siege of Nakoleia is unclear, but he was probably defeated; Theophanes's phrasing may imply that the town was taken, but Michael the Syrian reports that the Arabs suffered great losses and failed to capture it, a version of events confirmed by hagiographic sources. Al-Tabari reports that part of the main army under Yazid ibn Mazyad al-Shaybani met a Byzantine force led by a certain Niketas who was "count of counts" (perhaps the Count of the Opsician Theme), probably somewhere near Nicaea. In the ensuing battle, Niketas was wounded and unhorsed in single combat with the Arab general and forced to retire, probably to Nicomedia, where the imperial tagmata (professional guard regiments) under the Domestic of the Schools Anthony were assembled. Harun did not bother with them, and advanced to the town of Chrysopolis, across the Bosporus Strait from Constantinople itself. Lacking ships to cross the Bosporus, and with no intention of assaulting Constantinople in the first place, Harun probably intended this advance only as a show of force.

Furthermore, despite his success so far, Harun's position was precarious, as the defeat of al-Rabi threatened his lines of communication with the Caliphate. Consequently, after plundering the Byzantine capital's Asian suburbs, Harun turned his army back, but during his march along the valley of the Sangarius River, east of Nicaea, he was surrounded by the forces of the tagmata under Anthony in his rear and of the Bucellarians under their general Tatzates to his front. Fortunately for him, at this point Tatzates, an Armenian prince who had defected from his Arab-ruled homeland to the Byzantines in 760 and was closely associated with the iconoclast regime of Constantine V, secretly made contact with him. Tatzates offered to aid Harun in exchange for a pardon and a safe return for himself and his family to his native Armenia. Theophanes explains Tatzates's actions with his hostility towards Irene's favourite, Staurakios, but this evidently masks a broader dissatisfaction with Irene's regime. As the German Byzantinist Ralph-Johannes Lilie writes, "Tatzates did not see any big opportunities for himself under the new regime and indeed used the good chance that the situation offered him".

Thus, when Harun asked for negotiations, Irene dispatched a delegation of three of her most senior officials: the Domestic Anthony, the magistros Peter, and Staurakios himself. Confident of their military position, they neglected to secure promises for their safety or hostages of their own, so that when they arrived in the Arab camp, they were made prisoners. Coupled with the treachery of Tatzates and the unreliability of the troops under his command, Irene was now forced to negotiate for their release, especially of her trusted aide Staurakios.

"You made the round of Constantinople of the Greeks and placed your spear on her and its walls were covered with humiliation. You did not desire to take her and you contended yourself with received the tribute of her kings, while the cauldrons of war boiled."

— Poem by Marwan ibn Abi Hafsa in praise of Harun al-Rashid's 782 expedition against Byzantium.

The two states concluded a three-year truce in exchange for a heavy annual tribute—the Arab sources mention various amounts between 70,000 and 100,000 gold nomismata, while one also adds 10,000 pieces of silk. Tabari's account records that the tribute amounted to "ninety or seventy thousand dinars", to be paid "at the beginning of April and in June every year". In addition, the Byzantines were obliged to provide provisions and guides for Harun's army on its march home, and to hand over Tatzates's wife and property. Harun released all his captives (5,643 according to Tabari), but kept the rich plunder he had gathered, and returned to the Caliphate in September 782. Tabari, in his account of the expedition, says that Harun's forces captured 194,450 dinars in gold and 21,414,800 dirhams in silver, killed 54,000 Byzantines in battle and 2,090 in captivity and took over 20,000 riding animals captive while slaughtering 100,000 cattle and sheep. Tabari also reports that the amount of plunder was such that "a work horse was sold for a dirham and a mule for less than ten dirhams, a coat of mail for less than a dirham, and twenty swords for a dirham"—at a time when one to two dirhams was the usual daily salary of a labourer or soldier.

== Aftermath ==
The successful Arab invasion had important repercussions in Byzantium. The outcome represented a major blow to Empress Irene's prestige, while Tatzates, a capable and veteran leader, was lost to the Empire and became the ruler of his native Armenia for the Abbasids. On the other hand, despite the humiliating peace treaty, Byzantium's losses were not excessive, especially considering the scale of the Arab attack, and Irene used the three years of the truce to strengthen her internal position: she seems to have dismissed most of the "old guard" of Constantine V's generals, with the long-serving and fanatically iconoclast Michael Lachanodrakon being the most prominent victim of this bloodless purge. In this way, Irene secured control over the military, and was able to refocus its efforts in expanding and consolidating Byzantine control over the Slavs of the Balkans.

Despite the truce, the chronicler Ibn Wadih mentions Arab raids into Asia Minor for the years 783, 784 and 785. If true, then these would probably represent only minor affairs, as the main sources agree that the truce was mutually respected until spring 785. In that year, as Irene had strengthened her hold over the army and was preparing to confront the iconoclasts on the domestic front, she decided to cease payment of the tribute, and hostilities recommenced. In early 786, the Byzantines scored a major success, sacking and razing to the ground the fortress town of Hadath in Cilicia, which the Abbasids had spent the last five years turning into a major stronghold and military base for their cross-border expeditions. After the accession of Harun al-Rashid to the caliphal throne in the same year, however, the Abbasids regained the initiative. Arab pressure mounted, and in 798 Irene was forced to ask for a peace treaty that repeated the stipulations of the 782 truce.

== Bibliography ==
- Bosworth, C. E., ed. (1989). The History of al-Ṭabarī, Volume XXX: The ʿAbbāsid Caliphate in Equilibrium: The Caliphates of Mūsā al-Hādī and Hārūn al-Rashīd, A.D. 785–809/A.H. 169–192. SUNY Series in Near Eastern Studies. Albany, New York: State University of New York Press. ISBN 978-0-88706-564-4.
- Bonner, Michael (1996). Aristocratic Violence and Holy War: Studies in the Jihad and the Arab–Byzantine Frontier. New Haven, Connecticut: American Oriental Society. ISBN 0-940490-11-0.
- Brooks, E. W. (1923). "Chapter V. (A) The Struggle with the Saracens (717–867)". In Bury, J.B. (ed.). The Cambridge Medieval History, Vol. IV: The Eastern Roman Empire (717–1453). Cambridge: Cambridge University Press. pp. 119–138. OCLC 241580719.
- Canard, Marius (1926). "Les expéditions des Arabes contre Constantinople dans l'histoire et dans la légende" [The Expeditions of the Arabs against Constantinople in History and in Legend]. Journal Asiatique (in French) (208): 61–121. ISSN 0021-762X.
- El-Cheikh, Nadia Maria (2004). Byzantium Viewed by the Arabs. Cambridge, Massachusetts: Harvard Center of Middle Eastern Studies. ISBN 978-0-932885-30-2.
- El-Hibri, Tayeb (2010). "The empire in Iraq, 763–861". In Robinson, Chase F. (ed.). The New Cambridge History of Islam, Volume 1: The Formation of the Islamic World, Sixth to Eleventh Centuries. Cambridge: Cambridge University Press. pp. 269–304. ISBN 978-0-521-83823-8.
- Haug, Robert (2011). "Frontiers and the State in Early Islamic History: Jihād Between Caliphs and Volunteers". History Compass. 9 (8): 634–643. doi:10.1111/j.1478-0542.2011.00791.x. ISSN 1478-0542.
- Kennedy, Hugh, ed. (1990). The History of al-Ṭabarī, Volume XXIX: Al-Mansūr and al-Mahdī, A.D. 763–786/A.H. 146–169. SUNY Series in Near Eastern Studies. Albany, New York: State University of New York Press. ISBN 978-0-7914-0142-2.
- Kennedy, Hugh (2001). The Armies of the Caliphs: Military and Society in the Early Islamic State. London: Routledge. ISBN 978-0-203-45853-2.
- Lilie, Ralph-Johannes (1996). Byzanz unter Eirene und Konstantin VI. (780–802) [Byzantium under Irene and Constantine VI (780–802)] (in German). Frankfurt am Main: Peter Lang. ISBN 3-631-30582-6.
- Makripoulias, Christos (2002). "Campaign of the Arabs in Asia Minor, 781-82". Encyclopedia of the Hellenic World, Asia Minor. Athens: Foundation of the Hellenic World. Archived from the original on 9 November 2013.
- Mango, Cyril; Scott, Roger (1997). The Chronicle of Theophanes Confessor. Byzantine and Near Eastern History, AD 284–813. Oxford: Oxford University Press. ISBN 0-19-822568-7.
- Treadgold, Warren (1988). The Byzantine Revival, 780–842. Stanford, California: Stanford University Press. ISBN 978-0-8047-1462-4.
