= Symbatios the Armenian =

Byzantine aristocrat

Symbatios or Sabbatios, surnamed the Armenian (Greek: Συμβάτιος/Σαββάτιος ὁ Ἀρμένιος) was a senior Byzantine aristocrat and official in the mid-860s.

Symbatios was the son-in-law of the Caesar Bardas, the de facto ruler of the Byzantine Empire during the later reign of his nephew Michael III (r. 842–867). By 866, he held the rank of patrikios and the position of logothetes tou dromou.

Despite his ties to Bardas, he was a leading member in the conspiracy that resulted in the murder of Bardas on 21 April 866, in hopes of succeeding him. When Emperor Michael III publicly justified the murder of Bardas on 26 May, he claimed that Symbatios and another high court official, the chamberlain Basil the Macedonian, had warned him that Bardas intended to depose him.

However, Michael promoted Basil the Macedonian rather than Symbatios, who had to content himself with being named strategos of the Thracesian Theme. From there he rebelled in summer 866 against the growing power of Basil, along with the governor of the Opsician Theme, George Peganes. The rebellion was defeated in the following winter, and its leaders were arrested. Symbatios was mutilated, losing one eye and his right hand. He was publicly humiliated by being forced to beg for three days in the ta Laousou quarter, before being put under house arrest. When Basil the Macedonian deposed Michael III and became sole emperor in September 867; however, he lifted the banishment of Symbatios and the other rebels, and restored their property to them.

== Sources ==
- Lilie, Ralph-Johannes; Ludwig, Claudia; Pratsch, Thomas; Zielke, Beate (2013). Prosopographie der mittelbyzantinischen Zeit Online. Berlin-Brandenburgische Akademie der Wissenschaften. Nach Vorarbeiten F. Winkelmanns erstellt (in German). Berlin and Boston: De Gruyter.
