= Germanikeia Campaign (778) =

778 campaign by the Byzantines

- Part of the Arab–Byzantine wars
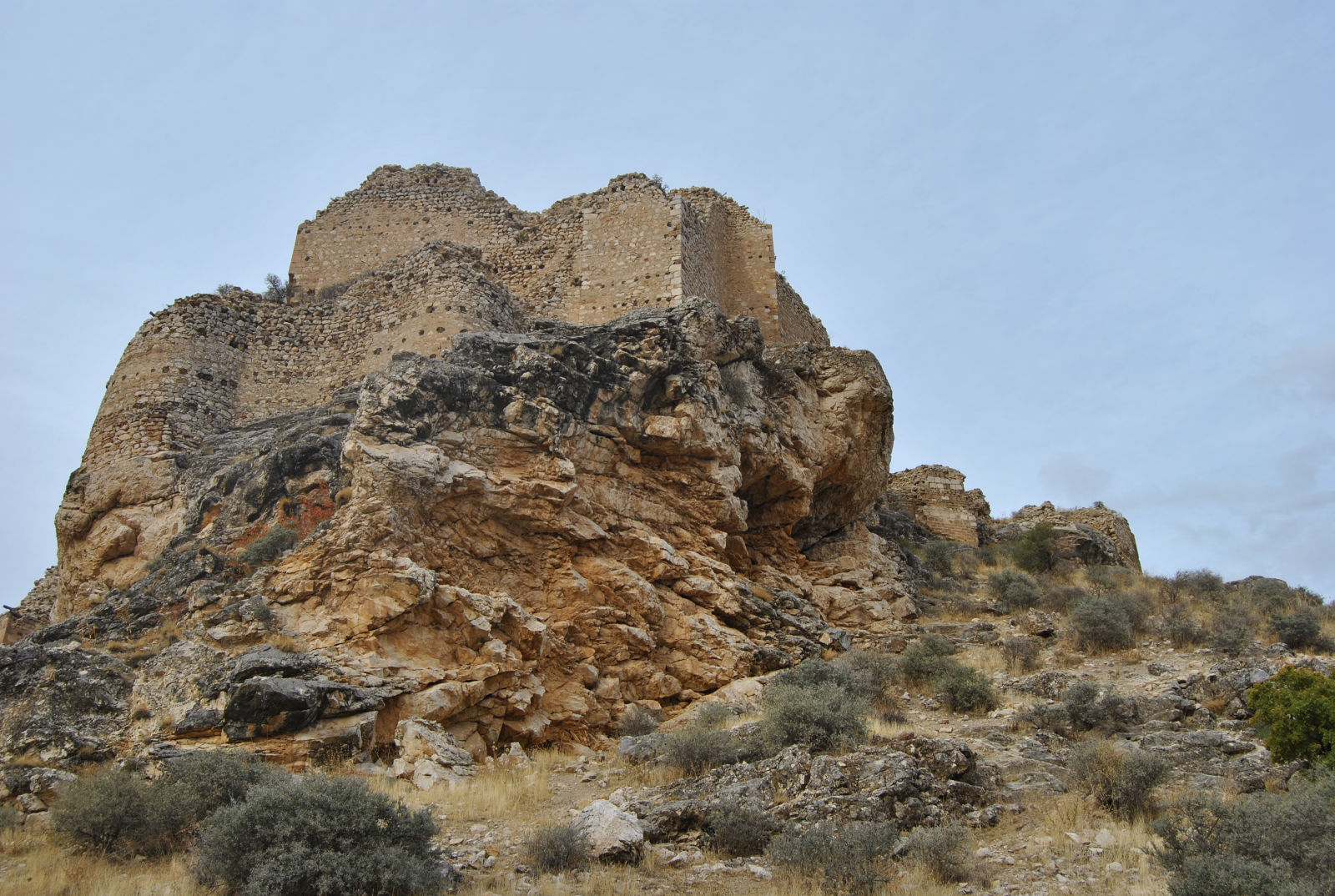
- A fortress in Kahramanmaraş province, near the site of ancient Germanikeia
| Date | 778 AD |
| Location | Germanikeia (modern Kahramanmaraş) & Cilicia, Turkey |
| Result | Byzantine victory; Germanikeia pays tribute to Byzantium |

Belligerents
| Byzantine Empire | Abbasid Caliphate |

Commanders and leaders
| Michael Lachanodrakon; Tatzates; Gregory; Artabasdos; Karisterotzes | Thumama ibn al-Walid; Isa bin Ali |

Strength
| 100,000 according to Theophanes (exaggerated) | Unknown (possibly 30,000–50,000) (Note: Large-scale Abbasid expeditions of these years are recorded to have been conducted with armies 30,000 to 50,000 strong, and Thumama had prepared an exceptionally ambitious campaign in 778 before being diverted to fight the Byzantine invasion (Treadgold 1988 p.34 & Howard-Johnston 2015 p.481-482)) |

Casualties and losses
| Unknown | 5 emirs killed |

The Germanikeia Campaign of 778 was a major Byzantine offensive against the Abbasid Caliphate. Led by the experienced general Michael Lachanodrakon, the Byzantine army successfully invaded Abbasid Syria, repelling Abbasid relief forces and plundering the surrounding countryside. The city of Germanikeia was ultimately forced to pay tribute, after which the Byzantines returned to Constantinople in triumph.

== Background ==
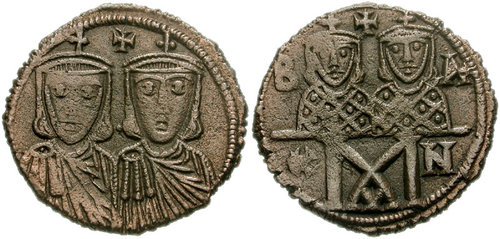
Follis depicting Leo IV and Constantine VI, paralleling them with Leo III and Constantine V

In 778, Emperor Leo IV learned that the Abbasid general Thumama ibn al-Walid had been assigned by the Caliph to prepare an ambitious invasion of Byzantine territory in the summer. Leo ordered a large-scale diversionary offensive against the Abbasid territories south of the Thughur, hoping to gain strategic momentum in the ongoing war against Al-Mahdi by thwarting Thumama's invasion plans. The army assembled for this campaign consisted of men drawn from the five major Themes, with the Thracesians, Anatolics, Bucellarians, Armeniacs, and Opsikion all being involved with their respective strategoi. The resulting force assembled was very large, though the figure of 100,000 men given by Theophanes is likely excessive. The strategos of the Thracesians, Michael Lachanodrakon, was appointed as the overall commander of expedition.

== Campaign and battle ==
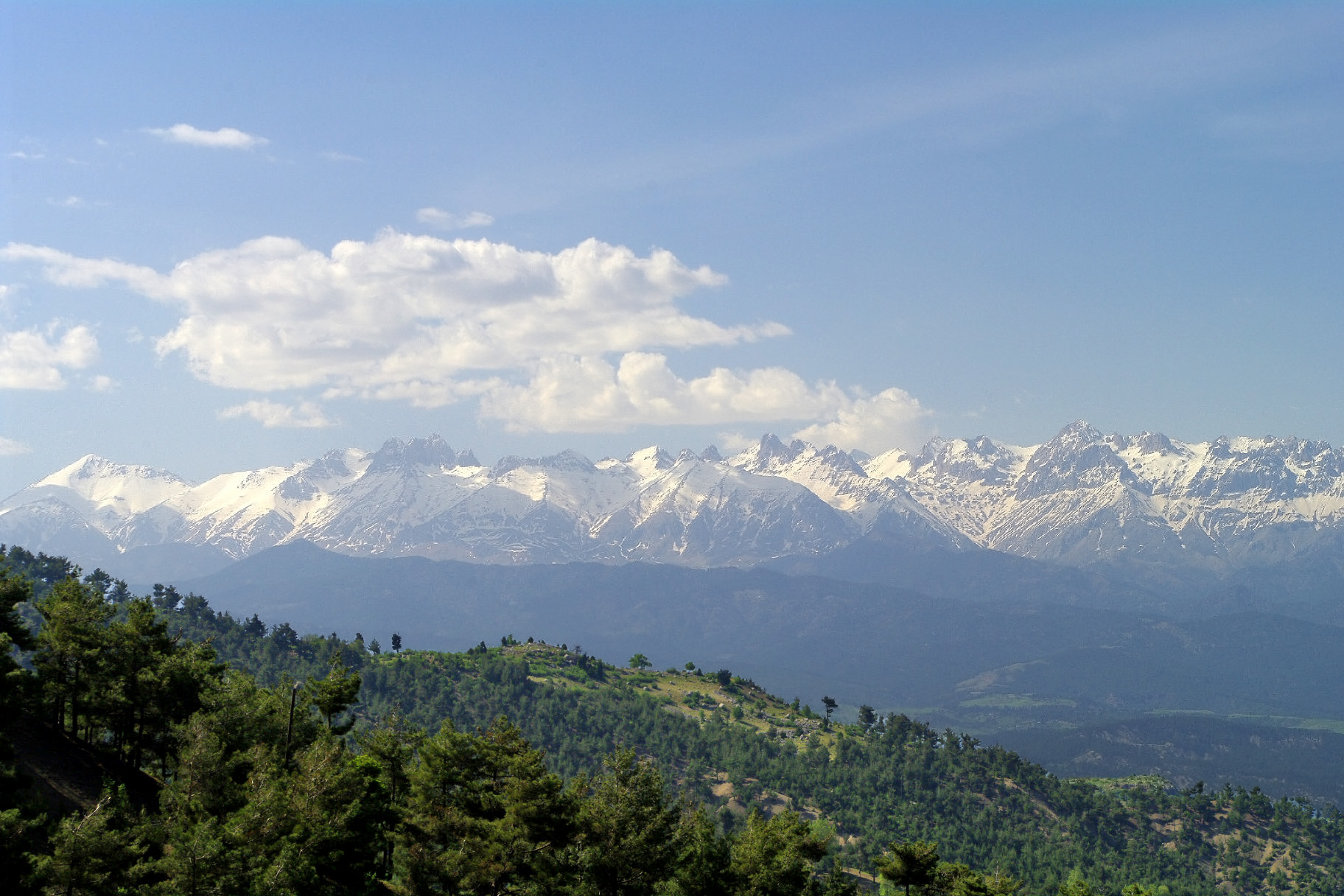
Anti-Taurus Mountains

With preparations set, Lachanodrakon led his men towards the frontier. Crossing the Anti-Taurus mountain range, the Byzantines entered Abbasid territory near Germanikeia. The city had been targeted due to the presence of Isa bin Ali, Al-Mahdi's uncle, within its walls. The Byzantines captured his caravan and camels outside the city and then invested Germanikeia itself. The city was on the point of falling before the inhabitants managed to ransom themselves by paying a large sum in tribute to the Byzantines. After lifting the siege, Lachanadrakon's army raided the province surrounding Germanikeia, before entering Cilicia and likewise devastating this region. The Byzantines were able to capture several Abbasid-held towns and fortresses in these regions and acquired an immense quantity of loot and prisoners from these successes.

Alarmed by damage inflicted on Abbasid territories during the invasion, Thumama was forced to abandon his plans to raid Anatolia and lead the army he had assembled to confront Lachanodrakon's returning army near Germanikeia. However, in the fighting which followed, the Byzantines checked the attempts by the Abbasid army to intercept them. In one engagement described by Theophanes, the Abbasids were routed with the loss of 2,000 warriors, though the remainder of their army escaped. According to the Armenian historian Łewond, Thumama's forces were crushed in other attempts to resist the Byzantine army. The Abbasids also suffered the loss of 5 Emirs. Having attained victory, Lachanodrakon led his men home to their Anatolian quarters.

== Aftermath ==
News of Lachanodrakon's successful invasion of Abbasid territory was received with jubilance by the Byzantine public. In Constantinople Emperor Leo organized a triumph with the spoils to celebrate the exploits of his generals. Most of the prisoners taken in the campaign (of whom many were Syriac Christians) were subsequently settled in Thrace.

The devastation of Abbasid territories along the Al-Awasim by the Byzantines during Michael Lachanadrakon's campaigns demanded a series of retaliatory actions by Al-Mahdi to restore Abbasid prestige. Already in 778, an Abbasid army under an unspecified commander launched a raid into Anatolia. However, this army failed to scout effectively, with the result that Lachanadrakon's forces were able to surround the Abbasids and inflict another defeat upon them. Lachanadrakon may have employed tactics reminiscent of those recorded later in the 10th-century military manual De velitatione bellica to achieve this success. Following this further Byzantine victory, Al-Mahdi replaced Thumama with the veteran general Hasan ibn Qahtaba, who was appointed to renew preparations for a large-scale Abbasid expedition, which came the following year in 779.

== Bibliography ==
- Treadgold, Warren (1988). The Byzantine Revival, 780–842.
- McMahon, Lucas (2015). The past and future of De Velitatione Bellica and Byzantine Guerrilla Warfare (PDF). Budapest, Hungary: Central European University.
- Turtledove, Harry (1982). 'The Chronicle of Theophanes' An English translation of anni mundi 6095-6305 (a.p. 602-813), with introduction and notes. Philadelphia: University of Pennsylvania Press. ISBN 0-8122-7842-9.
- Howard-Johnston, James (2015). "Theophanes on the Recent Past: The Crisis of 782 and Its Antecedents". Studies in Theophanes. Travaux et mémoires. Vol. 19. Paris: Association des Amis du Centre d’Histoire et Civilisation de Byzance. pp. 473–490.
