= Antzevatsi =

Armenian dynasty of Median/Carduchian origin

The Principality of Anjewaci or Andzewatsi was an Armenian dynasty of Medo-Kurdish or Carduchian ancestry, who ruled in an eponymous region in southern Armenia (modern southeastern Anatolia in today's south east Turkey). It was located in southeast of Lake Van and northwest of Ake and centered at the castle of Kangvar.

In 780, its chief prince Tachat Andzevatsi was under the suzerainty of the Abbasid Caliph. After him, the dynasty declined and it was reduced to vassalage of the Artsrunis in 860. The dynasty disappeared after 867.

== Rulers ==
- Gnel or Gunel Antzevatsi c. 374
- Chmavon, Zuaren and Aravan Antzevatsi c. 445
- Ohan Antsevatsi c. 480
- Seouk Antzevatsi c. 480
- Mouchel Antzevatsi (+863)
- Helen (regent) 863
- Tatzates
