= Hadath =

Al-Ḥadath al-Ḥamrā
- الحدث الحمراء (Arabic)
- Adata
- Location within Turkey
- 37.707°N 37.460°E
- Location: Turkey
- Region: Kahramanmaraş Province

Al-Ḥadath al-Ḥamrā' (Arabic for "Hadath the Red") or Adata (Greek: Ἃδατα) was a town and fortress near the Taurus Mountains (modern southeastern Turkey), which played an important role in the Byzantine–Arab Wars.

== Location ==
The town was located at ca. 1000 m altitude on the southern feet of the Taurus-Antitaurus range, near the upper course of the Aksu River in the Gölbaşı district. Its exact location has been lost, and it has been variously identified with locations north or south of Inekli lake.

== History ==
Hadath became important in the early Middle Ages due to its strategic location: it was located in the fortified frontier zone, the Thughūr, that separated the Umayyad and Abbasid empires from the Byzantine Empire. The town lay to the southwest of the important Pass of Hadath/Adata (darb al-Ḥadath) which led over the Taurus into Byzantine Anatolia, but was also situated between the two major frontier strongholds of Marash/Germanikeia (mod. Kahramanmaraş) and Malatya/Melitene, and controlled passage from northern Mesopotamia to western Armenia. As such, it became a major base for the frequent Muslim invasions and raids into Byzantine territories, and was often targeted by the Byzantines in return.

Map of the Byzantine-Arab frontier zone in southeastern Asia Minor, with the major fortresses

It was conquered by the Arabs under Habib ibn Maslama during the reign of Caliph Umar (r. 634–644), and became a base for the annual invasions launched against Byzantine Anatolia under the Caliph Muawiyah (r. 661–680). The Byzantines reclaimed the city in the 750s but did not reoccupy it permanently. In 778, the Byzantine general Michael Lachanodrakon sacked the city, but it was immediately rebuilt by Caliph Al-Mahdi (r. 775–785). Mahdi renamed it al-Mahdiya or al-Muhammadiya on this occasion, but these names failed to catch on. Mahdi's successor Al-Hadi further repopulated the city with people from the surrounding region, but in the winter of 786, floods caused heavy damage to the city walls, which had been hastily rebuilt of sun-dried bricks. The Byzantine strategos of the Armeniacs, Nikephoros, learned of this and destroyed the city, burning it to the ground.

It was completely rebuilt, refortified and garrisoned by Harun al-Rashid (r. 786–809), who made it one of the most important towns in the Thughūr. It is in this incarnation that the town is best known from literary sources: it was protected by the fortress of al-Uhaydab ("Little Hunchback"), built on a hill, while the town itself was reportedly as big as Marash. Hadath continued to serve the Abbasids as a base for cross-frontier raids, but the Byzantines also attacked the city several times, sacking it in 841 and 879. The region around the town and especially the pass were the scene of frequent and bloody clashes, to the extent that the Arabs reportedly renamed it darb al-salāma ("pass of peace") in an attempt, as the Encyclopedia of Islam comments, "to exorcise the evil fate which seemed to be attached to it". In 949/950, the Byzantines under Leo Phokas seized the town and razed it and its fortifications to the ground. It was rebuilt by the Hamdanid emir Sayf al-Dawla in 954, only to fall again to the Byzantines under Nikephoros Phokas in 957. The Byzantines razed and destroyed the city, but by 970 it was rebuilt and became the center of a new small theme.

The town thereafter descended into obscurity. It was captured by the Seljuks in 1150, and later by the Armenian Kingdom of Cilicia. Under the Armenians it became a base for their raids against the surrounding Muslim states until 1272, when the Mamluk Sultan Baybars (r. 1260–1277) sacked it, massacred its inhabitants and burned it down. The town continued to exist for a while, named Göynük ("the Burned") by the Turks and Armenians and Alhan by the local Kurds. It is last mentioned in 1436, when the Mamluk Sultan Barsbay (r. 1422–1438) used it as his base for a campaign against the Turkic beylik of Dulkadir.

== Syriac Orthodox Bishops of Hadath ==
Hadath was a significant center for the Syriac Orthodox Church, which maintained a diocese of Hadath based in the city from the eighth through the twelfth centuries. Fourteen Jacobite bishops of Hadath between the eighth and eleventh centuries are mentioned in the lists of Michael the Syrian.

== Sources ==
- Houtsma, Martijn Theodoor, ed. (1987). "Al-Ḥadath". E.J. Brill's first encyclopaedia of Islam, 1913–1936, Volume III. Leiden: BRILL. p. 187. ISBN 90-04-08265-4.
- Kaegi, Walter Emil (1995). Byzantium and the early Islamic conquests. Cambridge University Press. ISBN 978-0-521-48455-8.
- Oikonomidès, Nicolas (1972). Les listes de préséance byzantines des IXe et Xe siècles (in French). Paris.
- Ory, S. (1971). "al-Ḥadath". In Lewis, B.; Ménage, V. L.; Pellat, Ch. & Schacht, J. (eds.). The Encyclopaedia of Islam, Second Edition. Volume III: H–Iram. Leiden: E. J. Brill. pp. 19–20. OCLC 495469525.
- Todt, Klaus-Peter; Vest, Bernd Andreas (2014). Tabula Imperii Byzantini, Band 15: Syria (Syria Prōtē, Syria Deutera, Syria Euphratēsia) (in German). Vienna: Verlag der Österreichischen Akademie der Wissenschaften. ISBN 978-3-7001-7090-7.
- Treadgold, Warren (1997). A History of the Byzantine State and Society. Stanford, California: Stanford University Press. ISBN 0-8047-2630-2.
- Jean-Baptiste Chabot, Chronique de Michel le Syrien, Patriarche Jacobite d'Antiche (1166-1199). Éditée pour la première fois et traduite en francais I-IV (1899;1901;1905;1910; a supplement to volume I containing an introduction to Michael and his work, corrections, and an index, was published in 1924. Reprinted in four volumes 1963, 2010).
