= Syca =

Town of ancient Cilici

Coordinates: 36°06′15″N 33°01′03″E

Syca or Syce or Syke (Ancient Greek: Σύκη), also called Sycae or Sykai (Συκαί), possibly also called Setos, was a town of ancient Cilicia and later of Isauria, between Arsinoë and Celenderis. It became a bishopric; no longer the seat of a residential bishop, it remains a titular see of the Roman Catholic Church.

Syce is located near Softa Kalesi in Asiatic Turkey.
