= Cilician campaign of John II Komnenos =

1137–1138 Armenian-byzantine conflict

Campaigns of John II Komnenos
- Part of the Komnenian restoration
Date	1137-1138
Location	Cilicia (modern-day southern Turkey)
Result	Byzantine victory
Territorial changes	Capture of Tarsus, Adana, Mopsuestia, Anazarbus and Vahka

Belligerents
Byzantine Empire	Principality of Cilicia

Commanders and leaders
John II Komnenos; John Axouch; Alexios the Younger; Manuel Komnenos; Andronikos Komnenos	Prince Levon I (POW); Thoros (POW); Roupen (POW); Kostandin (POW)

Strength
25,000-30,000	20,000

Casualties and losses
Unknown	Heavy; members of the ruling dynasty including Levon captured

The Cilician campaign of John II Komnenos (1137–1138) was a major military expedition led by the Byzantine emperor John II Komnenos against the Rubenid Armenian Principality of Cilicia. Culminating in the total annexation of the principality following the capture of the Armenian prince Levon I and major strongholds, re-establishing direct Byzantine administrative control over southeastern Anatolia and the Levant for the first time since the events following the Battle of Manzikert.

== Background ==
Following his ascension to the throne in 1118, John II Komnenos dedicated his reign to reclaiming former imperial territories in Anatolia and the Levant. By the 1130s, however, his eastern ambitions were complicated by an internal dynastic crisis. In 1130, John's brother, the sebastokrator Isaac Komnenos, launched an unsuccessful coup attempt in Constantinople. Fleeing the capital, Isaac sought refuge in the East, traveling between the courts of the Seljuk Turks and Prince Levon I of Cilician Armenia. Isaac attempted to forge an anti-imperial coalition among Byzantium's rivals. This ongoing dynastic threat, combined with Prince Levon's refusal to acknowledge imperial sovereignty, provided John with a direct casus belli to launch a full-scale invasion of the region in 1137.

For decades, the independent Rubenid Armenian state had expanded its borders at the expense of local Byzantine infrastructure. Simultaneously, the neighboring Principality of Antioch under Raymond of Poitiers asserted overlapping claims to the same border regions. Seeking to expand Crusader territory northward, Raymond launched localized military incursions into Cilicia. In 1136, Raymond successfully captured Prince Levon through treachery during a diplomatic meeting, though he was forced to release the Armenian prince after an exorbitant ransom and territorial concessions were negotiated.

Viewing the contested territories of both principalities as legally belonging to the Byzantine Empire under the historical terms of the Treaty of Devol, the emperor ultimately intervened. John mobilized a massive imperial field army to permanently reassert Roman sovereignty over the fractured frontier, moving to suppress the Armenian breakaway state before confronting Antioch.

== Campaign and reconquest of Cilicia ==
In the spring of 1137, John personally led the imperial field army, totaling approximately 25,000 to 30,000 men, away from the capital. The vanguard consisted of elite Varangian guards and diverse mercenary cavalry contingents. Gathering the army at Attalia, John bypassed the heavily defended mountain passes of the Taurus range, instead marching his forces eastward along the Mediterranean coast. The primary line of march moved through Corycus, which fell to imperial forces with little resistance.

Upon entering the lowlands, the speed and scale of the Byzantine deployment completely overwhelmed local garrisons. The major urban administrative and economic hubs of the Cilician plain—Tarsus, Adana, and Mopsuestia, capitulated in rapid succession, restoring direct Byzantine governance over the lowlands within a matter of weeks.

With the plains secured, the imperial army turned its focus to the heavily fortified strongholds of the Armenian interior. The strategic epicenter of Rubenid resistance was the city of Anazarbus. Situated on a steep crag, the fortress possessed formidable defensive masonry and a determined garrison that rejected initial imperial terms for surrender.

John initiated a formal siege, deploying the empire's advanced artillery train. Byzantine engineers constructed heavy trebuchets and large battering rams to target vulnerable sections of the lower curtain walls. Despite fierce defensive sorties from the Armenian garrison, a sustained bombardment breached the outer defenses. Imperial infantry flooded the breach, capturing the lower city and eventually forcing the surrender of the citadel.

The fall of Anazarbus shattered the organized military capacity of the Rubenid dynasty. Prince Levon and his remaining loyalists retreated further into the high fortresses of the Taurus Mountains. John rejected a prolonged pursuit in the rough terrain, choosing instead to systematically isolate and blockade the mountain strongholds. Cut off from agricultural supplies and reinforcing allies, the mountain defenses collapsed sequentially.

By early 1138, Prince Levon, his wife, and his sons, including the future Thoros II, were captured by Byzantine detachments. The ruling dynasty was placed in chains and transported back to Constantinople as political prisoners, effectively dissolving the independent Armenian administrative apparatus for a generation. During this theater of the campaign, John II also achieved a political resolution to his ongoing dynastic crisis; his rebellious brother Isaac arrived in the camp, renounced his claims to the throne, and reconciled with the emperor.

== Aftermath ==
The swift and total liquidation of the Rubenid state radically altered the strategic landscape for the neighboring Principality of Antioch. Having previously conducted localized raids into Cilicia, Raymond of Poitiers suddenly found a massive, victorious imperial army positioned directly along his unfortified northern border.

Alarmed by the news in Cilicia and Caught outside the city walls during the surprise advance, Prince Raymond was barely able to evade capture, successfully retreating inside the fortifications with his bodyguards through the Iron Gate.

Recognizing that he lacked the manpower or regional alliances to survive an open field war or a prolonged siege, Raymond surrendered Antioch without initiating hostilities. In late 1137, Raymond traveled to the imperial camp, knelt before John and swore a formal oath of fealty as a vassal of the Byzantine state.

The imperial standard was hoisted over the citadel of Antioch, legally bringing the principality back into the imperial orbit in accordance with the Treaty of Devol. Under the capitulation terms, Raymond was permitted to retain internal administration of Antioch on the condition that if a joint Byzantine-Crusader campaign successfully captured Aleppo from Muslim forces, Antioch would be transferred to direct imperial rule, and Raymond would receive Aleppo as compensation.

== Bibliography ==
- Angold, Michael (1984). The Byzantine Empire, 1025–1204: A Political History. London, United Kingdom: Longman. ISBN 9780582294684. ISBN 0-582-49061-8
- Barber, Malcolm (2012). The Crusader States. Yale University Press. ISBN 978-0-300-11312-9.
- Birkenmeier, John W. (2002). The Development of the Komnenian Army: 1081–1180. Leiden: Brill. ISBN 90-04-11710-5.
- Bucossi, A. and Suarez, A.R. (eds.) (2016). John II Komnenos, Emperor of Byzantium: In the Shadow of Father and Son, Routledge, London and New York ISBN 978-1-4724-6024-0
- Niketas Choniates, critical edition and translation by Magoulias, Harry J., ed. (1984). O City of Byzantium: Annals of Niketas Choniatēs. Detroit: Wayne State University Press. ISBN 978-0-8143-1764-8.
- Hamilton, Bernard (1980). The Latin Church in the Crusader States: The Secular Church. Ashgate.
- Harris, Jonathan (2014). Byzantium and the Crusades (2nd ed.). Bloomsbury Academic. ISBN 978-1780938318.
- Kinnamos, John (1976). Deeds of John and Manuel Comnenus. Translated by Brand, Charles M. Columbia University Press. ISBN 0-231-04080-6 – via Archive.org.
- Morton, Nicholas (2020). The Crusader States & their Neighbours: A Military History, 1099–1187. Oxford University Press. ISBN 978-0-19-882454-1.
- Runciman, Steven (1952). A History of the Crusades. Vol. 2: The Kingdom of Jerusalem and the Frankish East, 1100–1187. Cambridge University Press. Reprint: ISBN 9780521347716.
