= Principality of Ake =

The Principality of Ake was a Carduchian or possibly Median dynasty who ruled territory in what is now south eastern Turkey. The principality was located between the upper valley of the Centritis and the Zabus (Lycus), southeast of lake Van, between Arzanene and Adiabene, in what later became southern Vaspurakan. The princes of Ake took part in the insurrection of 451 and were active at the battle of Avarayr. They played a significant regional role until the Arab invasion. At the beginning of 10th century the principality became a vassal of the Artsrunis of Vaspurakan.
