= Battle of Keramaia =

8th-century naval battle during the Arab–Byzantine Wars

- Part of the Arab–Byzantine wars
- Map of the Arab–Byzantine naval conflict in the Mediterranean, 7th–11th centuries
Date	746
Location	Keramaia, Cyprus
Result	Byzantine victory

Belligerents
Byzantine Empire	Umayyad Caliphate

Commanders and leaders
Unnamed strategos of the Cibyrrhaeots	Unknown

Strength
Unknown	30 ships

The Battle of Keramaia was a major Byzantine naval victory over the Egyptian fleet of the Umayyad Caliphate at Cyprus in 746.

== Battle ==
The battle is mentioned by the Byzantine historians Theophanes the Confessor, Patriarch Nikephoros I of Constantinople, and Anastasius Bibliothecarius. According to these sources, the Egyptian fleet sailed from Alexandria to Cyprus. The Byzantine strategos of the Cibyrrhaeots (who is not specifically named) managed to surprise the Arabs and blockade the entrance of the harbour of Keramaia. As a result, almost the entire Arab fleet—Theophanes writes, with obvious exaggeration, of a thousand dromons, while Anastasius gives the more plausible number of thirty vessels—was destroyed. According to Theophanes, "it is said that only three ships escaped".

== Aftermath ==
This crushing defeat was a signal event: in its aftermath, the Egyptian fleets are not mentioned until the second half of the 9th century, following the Sack of Damietta. Beginning with E. W. Brooks, several scholars assumed that during this entire period, there was no Egyptian navy to speak of. This is incorrect, as Arabic and Coptic sources clearly mention the presence of an arsenal at Fustat and naval activity in Egypt throughout the period, but nevertheless Egypt apparently ceased to be a major base for naval expeditions against Byzantium during the century after Keramaia.

== Sources ==
- Kubiak, Władyslaw B. (1970). "The Byzantine Attack on Damietta in 853 and the Egyptian Navy in the 9th Century". Byzantion. 40: 45–66. ISSN 0378-2506.
- Mango, Cyril; Scott, Roger (1997). The Chronicle of Theophanes Confessor. Byzantine and Near Eastern History, AD 284–813. Oxford: Oxford University Press. ISBN 0-19-822568-7.
