= Tatzates =

- Died: 785
- Allegiance: Byzantine Empire (750s–782); Abbasid Caliphate (782–785)
- Service years: 750s–785
- Rank: strategos
- Conflicts: Arab–Byzantine frontier wars, Arab–Khazar wars

Tatzates or Tatzatios (Greek: Τατζάτης or Τατζάτιος, from Armenian: Տաճատ Tačat) was a prominent Byzantine general of Armenian descent, who in 782 defected to the Abbasids and was appointed governor of Arminiya.

== Biography ==
Tatzates belonged to the noble Armenian Andzevatsi family. Probably in the 750s, he came to the Byzantine Empire and entered the service of Emperor Constantine V (r. 741–775). Under Constantine V, he reportedly fought against the Bulgars, and achieved the position of strategos (general and governor of a theme) by circa 760. It is not known which themes he commanded, but by 776 he led the Bucellarian Theme. In the same year, he led his army in a successful expedition against the Arabs, reaching Samosata. In 778, he took part in a successful large-scale expedition against Germanikeia under the overall command of Michael Lachanodrakon, and in 781 he fought, again under Lachanodrakon, in the Byzantine victory at Caesarea over an Arab invasion led by 'Abd al-Kabir.

In 782, the Abbasid Caliph's son, Harun al-Rashid (Caliph in 786–809), campaigned against the Byzantine Empire and invaded Asia Minor. The Byzantines, under the eunuch logothete Staurakios, managed to cut off Harun's return and encircle his army. Tatzates chose this moment to defect to Harun with many of his men. His defection, however, was kept secret for a while, allowing Harun to seize the Byzantine envoys, Staurakios among them, who had come to negotiate a truce. The Abbasid commander was thus able to dictate harsh terms to Empress-regent Irene of Athens.

The reasons for this action are not fully clear. Theophanes the Confessor cites his hatred for Irene's favourite Staurakios, while the Armenian historian Ghevond Yerets, more plausibly, suggests that he lost favour at court and feared his imminent replacement as part of Irene's policy of removing Constantine V's staunchly iconoclast generals from power. Theophanes also records that in his defection, Tatzates left behind his wife and all his property, and that they joined him only later, when peace was signed; Armenian sources, however, report that he took them with him when he defected. Harun appointed Tatzates as governor of Arminiya (the Transcaucasian principalities). He was killed during a campaign against the Khazars in 785.

== Sources ==
- Garland, Lynda (1999). Byzantine Empresses: Women and Power in Byzantium, AD 527–1204. London and New York: Routledge. ISBN 978-0-415-14688-3.
- Kazhdan, Alexander, ed. (1991). The Oxford Dictionary of Byzantium. Oxford and New York: Oxford University Press. ISBN 0-19-504652-8.
- Lilie, Ralph-Johannes; Ludwig, Claudia; Pratsch, Thomas; Zielke, Beate (2001). "Tatzates (#7241)". Prosopographie der mittelbyzantinischen Zeit: 1. Abteilung (641–867), Band 4: Platon (# 6266) – Theophylaktos (# 8345) (in German). Berlin and Boston: De Gruyter. pp. 320–321. ISBN 978-3-11-016674-3.
- Treadgold, Warren (1988). The Byzantine Revival, 780–842. Stanford, California: Stanford University Press. ISBN 978-0-8047-1462-4.
- Tritle, Lawrence A. "Tatzates' Flight and the Byzantine-Arab Peace Treaty of 782". Byzantion: Revue Internationale des Études Byzantines. 47: 297–300.
