= Michael Lachanodrakon =

Byzantine governor and general (died 792)

- Died: July 20, 792
- Allegiance: Eastern Roman (Byzantine) Empire
- Service years: 760s–792
- Rank: strategos
- Commands: Thracesian Theme
- Conflicts: Arab–Byzantine wars: Battle of Syca (771); Germanikeia Campaign (778); Abbasid invasion of Asia Minor (779); Battle of Caesarea (781); Abbasid invasion of Asia Minor (782); Byzantine–Bulgarian wars; Battle of Marcellae †

Michael Lachanodrakon (Greek: Μιχαήλ Λαχανοδράκων; died 20 July 792) was a Byzantine general and fanatical supporter of the policy of iconoclasm under Emperor Constantine V (r. 741–775). As a result of his iconoclast zeal, in 766 he rose to high office as governor of the Thracesian Theme, and instigated a series of repressive measures against iconophile practices, particularly targeting the monasteries. A talented general, he also led a series of campaigns against the Arabs of the Abbasid Caliphate before being dismissed from office in about 782. Restored to imperial favour in 790, he fell at the Battle of Marcellae against the Bulgars in 792.

== Persecution of the iconophiles ==
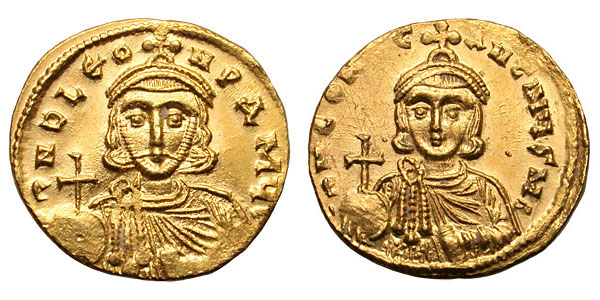
Gold coin of Emperor Leo III the Isaurian (r. 717–741), depicted with his son and successor, Constantine V. Leo first promoted iconoclasm, which became official policy under Constantine.

Nothing is known of Lachanodrakon's origins and early life. He receives a very negative treatment in the historical sources, which were written after the final defeat of Byzantine Iconoclasm; some refer to him solely as ho Drakon (ὁ Δράκων, "the Dragon", alluding to his surname and the Biblical Beast). Their profoundly iconophile perspective means that reports of his actions, especially those relating to the suppression of icon worship, are potentially untrustworthy.

At the Council of Hieria in 754, Constantine V had declared the adoration of icons to be a heresy, and had thereby elevated iconoclasm to official imperial policy. No persecution of iconophiles was launched at first, but iconophile resistance grew, until from 765 on, Constantine began persecuting iconophiles, and especially monks. The discovery of a wide-ranging iconophile plot against him involving some of the highest civil and military officials of the state in 766 provoked an extreme reaction. Patriarch Constantine II and other officials were deposed, jailed, publicly humiliated, and finally executed, replaced by new, uncompromisingly iconoclast officials. In addition, the veneration of sacred relics and prayers to the saints and the Virgin Mary were condemned.

Map of the themes and major settlements of Byzantine Asia Minor and the Arab–Byzantine frontier zone in the late 8th century

By 763 or 764, according to the iconophile Life of St Stephen the Younger hagiography, Lachanodrakon had already distinguished himself by his iconoclast fervour. On the emperor's orders, he led a group of soldiers on an invasion of the Pelekete Monastery on the Propontis, where he arrested 38 monks and subjected the remainder to various tortures and mutilations. After burning down the monastery, he took the 38 captives to Ephesus, where they were executed. In 766/767, as part of the emperor's reshuffle of the senior echelons of the Byzantine Empire, Lachanodrakon was rewarded with the important post of strategos (military governor) of the Thracesian Theme, and given the rank of patrikios and imperial protospatharios according to his seal. He soon began a harsh repression of the monasteries and iconophiles. According to Theophanes the Confessor, in 769/770 he summoned the monks and nuns of his theme to Ephesus, gathered them in the city's tzykanisterion and forced them to marry, threatening them with blinding and exile to Cyprus if they refused. Although many resisted and "became martyrs" in Theophanes's words, many complied. Later reports of exiled monks in Cyprus becoming Arab captives seem to partly corroborate this story. Theophanes reports further that in 771/772, Lachanodrakon dissolved all monasteries in the theme, confiscated and expropriated their property, and sent the proceeds to the emperor, who replied with a letter thanking him for his zeal. Lachanodrakon allegedly had relics, holy scriptures, and monks' beards set on fire, killed or tortured those who venerated relics, and finally prohibited the tonsure. Although highly embellished, these reports probably reflect actual events. At any rate, by 772, according to historian Warren Treadgold, Lachanodrakon seems to have succeeded in "eradicating monasticism within his theme".

== Military activities ==
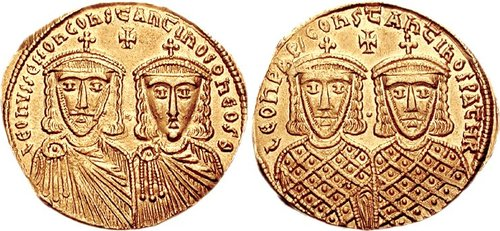
Gold coin of Emperor Leo IV the Khazar (r. 775–780), also depicting his son and co-emperor Constantine VI, as well as the Isaurian dynasty's founders Leo III and Constantine V.

Lachanodrakon was also a capable general, winning fame for his campaigns against the Abbasids on the Byzantine Empire's eastern frontier. In 770 or 771, late in the reign of Constantine V, Lachanodrakon, at this time strategos of the Anatolikon, was among the Byzantine strategoi (along with the Boukellarion, Armeniacs and Cibyrrhaeots) that marched against an Abbasid army near the coastal town of Syke, initially defeating and forcing them onto the defensive, and then attempting to envelop the Arabs. However, this operation failed when the Abbasid commander conducted a desperate attack and routed part of the thematic cavalry, thus allowing his remaining forces to break through the Byzantine cordon and continue their raid, collecting plunder before retiring to Abbasid territory. Despite this tactical setback, the operation had been a strategic Byzantine success in forcing the Abbasids to abandon their attempt on Syke, and Lachanodrakon's military status continued to rise. During the reign of Constantine V's son Leo IV (r. 775–780) he seems to have been the most prominent military commander, repeatedly leading expeditions comprising troops from several themes against the Arabs.

The first such expedition occurred in 778 when, preempting an anticipated Arab raid, Lachanodrakon led a large army on a Campaign against Germanikeia. Although the city did not fall (Theophanes claims that the Arab commander bribed Lachanodrakon), the Byzantine army defeated a relief force, plundered the region, and took many captives, mostly Jacobites, who were then resettled in Thrace. Later in 778, Lachanodrakon surrounded and annihilated an Abbasid army that had invaded Anatolia in retaliation for the Germanikeia Campaign. The following year, Lachanodrakon may have been among the Strategoi conducting a Fabian defensive strategy during an Abbasid Campaign in Asia minor, though the sources do not record his specific role in this invasion. These operations thwarted the attempts of the Abbasid commander Hasan ibn Qahtaba to capture Dorylaeum and Amorium.

In 780, Lachanodrakon ambushed and defeated an Arab invasion in the Armeniac Theme, killing the brother of the Arab commander Thumama ibn al-Walid. Theophanes records that in 781 Lachanodrakon defeated another Arab invasion under 'Abd al-Kabir and forced it to withdraw, although he ascribes the success to the sakellarios John. (Note: Theophanes serves as the main primary source on the battle. The later Persian historian Al-Tabari omitted mention of a defeat in his writing on the campaign, but described an impromptu Abbasid withdrawal from Anatolia) In 782, he fought a bloody battle at Dareno against the Abbasid general al-Barmaqi, who attacked the Thracesian theme during a large-scale invasion led by the future caliph Harun al-Rashid (r. 786–809). The battle was either a Byzantine defeat or inconclusive, with both sides suffering heavy losses, but Al-Barmaqi withdrew following the encounter. In the aftermath of this engagement, likely influenced by his iconoclast past, Lachanodrakon was apparently removed from his command by the iconophile empress-regent Irene of Athens.

Lachanodrakon reappears in 790, when the young emperor Constantine VI (r. 780–797) conspired to overturn the tutelage of Irene. The general was sent by Constantine to the Armeniac Theme to secure the allegiance of its soldiers. Constantine succeeded in toppling his mother in December 790; it was probably then that Lachanodrakon was rewarded with the supreme non-imperial title, that of magistros. According to the account of Theophanes, he participated in the imperial campaign against the Bulgars in 792 that led to the disastrous defeat at the Battle of Marcellae on 20 July, where he was killed. The history of John Skylitzes records his death in the Battle of Versinikia, again against the Bulgars, in 813, but this is clearly an error.

== Sources ==
- Hollingsworth, Paul A. (1991). "Lachanodrakon, Michael". In Kazhdan, Alexander (ed.). The Oxford Dictionary of Byzantium. Oxford and New York: Oxford University Press. p. 1168. ISBN 0-19-504652-8.
- Rochow, Ilse (1994). Kaiser Konstantin V. (741–775). Materialien zu seinem Leben und Nachleben (in German). Frankfurt am Main: Peter Lang. ISBN 3-631-47138-6.
- Stouraitis, Ioannis (25 July 2005). "Michael Lachanodrakon". Encyclopaedia of the Hellenic World, Asia Minor. Athens: Foundation of the Hellenic World.
- Treadgold, Warren (1997). A History of the Byzantine State and Society. Stanford, California: Stanford University Press. ISBN 0-8047-2630-2.
- Treadgold, Warren (1988). The Byzantine Revival, 780–842.
- Lilie, Ralph-Johannes; Ludwig, Claudia; Pratsch, Thomas; Zielke, Beate (2000). Prosopographie der mittelbyzantinischen Zeit: 1. Abteilung (641–867), Band 3: Leon (# 4271) – Placentius (# 6265) (in German). Berlin and Boston: De Gruyter. pp. 273–274. ISBN 978-3-11-016673-6.
- Howard-Johnston, James (2015). "Theophanes on the Recent Past: The Crisis of 782 and Its Antecedents". Studies in Theophanes. Travaux et mémoires. Vol. 19. Paris: Association des Amis du Centre d’Histoire et Civilisation de Byzance.
- McMahon, Lucas (2015). The past and future of De Velitatione Bellica and Byzantine Guerrilla Warfare (PDF). Budapest, Hungary: Central European University.
- Lombard, Alfred (1902). Constantine V, Emperor of the Romans: (740-775): studies in Byzantine history (In French). Paris, France: University of Paris.
