= Thumama ibn al-Walid =

Arab general under the Abbasid empire

Thumāma ibn al-Walīd ibn Qa‘qā al-‘Absi‘ (Arabic: ثمامة بن الوليد بن قعقاع العبسي) was an Arab general of noble lineage from Syria, who served the Abbasid Caliphate.

He belonged to a family of the Banu Abs, part of the old Arab tribal nobility (ashraf), which became affiliated with the Umayyad dynasty when Caliph Abd al-Malik ibn Marwan (r. 685–705) married a cousin of Thumama's grandfather Qa'qa' ibn Khulayd al-'Absi. His father al-Walid served the Umayyads as general and governor of Qinnasrin, but was tortured to death along with Thumama's uncle Abd al-Malik and other family members when the two brothers opposed the accession of al-Walid II (r. 743–744).

Thumama survived the purge and served the Abbasids, who overthrew the Umayyads, as general against the Byzantine Empire. He led the annual summer raids into Byzantine Asia Minor in 777 and in 778, when he was defeated by the Byzantine general Michael Lachanodrakon. He was also placed in charge of the expedition in 779, but according to al-Tabari he failed to carry it out, and was replaced by al-Hasan ibn Qahtaba.

Nothing more is known about Thumama, but his son Uthman was one of the local leaders of Qinnasrin who used the turmoil of the Fourth Fitna in the 810s to become virtually autonomous rulers of their localities.

== Sources ==
- Crone, Patricia (1980). Slaves on Horses: The Evolution of the Islamic Polity (1980 ed.). Cambridge: Cambridge University Press. ISBN 978-0521229616.
- Kennedy, Hugh, ed. (1990). The History of al-Ṭabarī, Volume XXIX: Al-Mansūr and al-Mahdī, A.D. 763–786/A.H. 146–169. SUNY Series in Near Eastern Studies. Albany, New York: State University of New York Press. ISBN 978-0-7914-0142-2.
