= Thracesian Theme =

Byzantine military-civilian province

Theme of the Thracesians Θρᾳκήσιον θέμα, θέμα Θρᾳκησίων, Θρᾳκήσιοι
- Theme of the Byzantine Empire
- 640s–660s / 700s–710s – c. 1078; 1097–1330
- The Byzantine themata in c. 780, after the split of the Opsikion; the Thracesian Theme at left, on the west coast of Anatolia.
- Capital: Ephesus or Chonae (7th–11th centuries), Philadelphia and later Smyrna (12th–14th centuries)
- Historical era: Middle Ages
  - Established: 640s–660s or c. 700s–710s
  - Fall to the Seljuks: c. 1078
  - Byzantine recovery: c. 1097
  - Fall to the Turks: 1330

The Thracesian Theme (Greek: Θρᾳκήσιον θέμα, Thrakēsion thema), more properly known as the Theme of the Thracesians (Greek: θέμα Θρᾳκησίων, thema Thrakēsiōn, often simply Θρᾳκήσιοι, Thrakēsioi), was a Byzantine theme (a military-civilian province) in western Asia Minor (modern Turkey). Created either in the mid-7th or the early 8th century as the settlement of the former Army of Thrace, after which it was named, it was one of the larger and more important themes of the Empire throughout its existence based on its proximity to Constantinople. The Thracesian Theme was one of the longest-lived themes, surviving until the region was conquered by the Turks in the early 14th century.

== History ==
As with the other themes, the exact date of foundation is unclear. The Thracesians are first securely attested in 711, when a "tourmarchēs of the Thracesians" named Christopher was dispatched against Cherson by Emperor Justinian II, while a governing stratēgos is only attested as late as 741. It is hence traditionally assumed that the Thracesians were initially a tourma (division) of the Anatolic Theme, and that they were raised to a full theme some time after 695, probably in the early years of the 8th century, but the phrasing of the sources does not make clear whether that had been done by 711. Some modern scholars, like Ralph-Johannes Lilie and John Haldon, however, have argued that the Thracesian army is to be identified with the Thracianus exercitus ("Thracian army") mentioned in a decree of 687, and that consequently the Thracesian theme was one of the original themes established in Asia Minor.

The name of the theme derives from the fact that the themes were formed in the mid-7th century, following the Muslim conquests, as military encampment areas for the remnants of the old field armies of the East Roman army; in the case of the Thracesians, the field army of the magister militum per Thracias. This is further supported by the fact that units that are known to have been part of the latter in the 4th/5th centuries, the vexillatio palatina of the Equites Theodosiaci Iuniores and the auxilium palatinum of the Victores, are attested again as the thematic tourmai of the Theodosiakoi and Viktores in the 10th century. This provides the Thracesian theme with the distinction of fielding some of the oldest known units of the Byzantine army. This origin is reflected in the mythical story narrated by Emperor Constantine VII (reigned 913–959) in his De Thematibus, whereby the region was named after some Thracians settled there in the early 6th century BC by Alyattes of Lydia.

The first known stratēgos of the Thracesians, a certain Sisinnios, supported Constantine V (r. 740–775) against the usurper Artabasdos (r. 741–742), but was himself later blinded by the emperor on suspicion of conspiracy. Constantine took care to appoint a series of governors loyal to him and his policies, the most prominent among them being the ardent iconoclast Michael Lachanodrakon. Lachanodrakon launched a brutal persecution of iconophiles, especially the monks, so that by 772, in the words of historian Warren Treadgold, he seems to have succeeded in "eradicating monasticism within his theme". Other notable governors of the theme include Bardanes Tourkos, who was its stratēgos in the 790s and rebelled against Nikephoros I (r. 803–811) in 803; Constantine Kontomytes, who defeated the Cretan Saracens at Mount Latros in 841 and married into the imperial family; Petronas, the uncle of Michael III (r. 842–867) and the Empire's leading general, in 856–863; and Symbatios the Armenian, who along with the governor of the Opsician Theme George Peganes tried to oppose the growing power of Basil the Macedonian, Michael III's protégé who eventually usurped the throne from him.

In the 10th century, as the threat of Arab raids subsided, the soldiers of the Thracesians appear to have been used more and more in overseas expeditions, such as those sent against the Emirate of Crete in 911, 949 and 960. The same process saw the theme gradually becoming a peaceful backwater; when the formidable general Constantine Diogenes was named its stratēgos in 1029, the appointment was seen as a demotion, intended to curb his suspected designs on the throne.

The theme was briefly conquered by the Seljuk Turks in the late 1070s, but most of its territory was recovered by John Doukas with the help of the First Crusade in the late 1090s. John II Komnenos (r. 1118–1143) re-established the theme as an administrative unit, albeit with a reduced size, under a doux based at Philadelphia. The southern portion of the old theme became part of the new theme of Mylasa and Melanoudion. It was reconstituted under the Nicaean Empire, and by this time consisted of the katepanikia of Smyrna and Anaia along the Aegean coast, and the chora of Pyrgion and Kaloe in the upper Kaystros valley. Basil Chrysomalles is the first known governor after 1204, and the list of governors from 1233 until 1260 is almost complete. The theme of Maeander, with its seat at Antioch-on-the-Maeander, was subordinated to it.

The Thracesian Theme was one of the last Byzantine territories in Asia Minor to fall to the various Turkish beyliks, and played an important role as a bulwark against their raids. By the early 14th century, however, it had been restricted to the area around Smyrna, until that city also fell to the Beylik of Aydın in 1330.

== Geography and administration ==
The theme of the Thracesians comprised the ancient regions of Ionia (the late Roman province Asia), Lydia, the northern half of Caria, and part of Phrygia Pacatiana. The theme was bordered on the west by the Aegean Sea, with its coastline stretching from Ephesus to Adramyttion, the Opsician Theme in the north, probably along the valley of the river Caicus), the Anatolic Theme in the east (somewhere east of Chonae and Laodicea on the Lycus), and the Cibyrrhaeot Theme in the south. The theme contained some 20 cities, although most of them were much reduced from their late antique status. Smyrna and Ephesus (known as "Theologos" at the time) were probably the largest among them. The Persian geographer Ibn Khordadbeh, who wrote c. 847, mentions Ephesus as the capital, but this is not certain; it may instead have been at Chonae.

The theme's governing stratēgos ranked in the first tier of thematic governors and received an annual salary of 40 pounds of gold. The Arab geographer Qudama ibn Ja'far, who wrote c. 930, gives the troops under his command as 6,000, while Ibn al-Faqih, who wrote a generation earlier, puts them as high as 10,000. In 949, its senior-most officers were, in order of rank, the tourmarchēs of the Theodosiakoi, the tourmarchēs of the Viktores, the tourmarchēs of the seacoast (tēs paraliou), and a meriarchēs. The coast was also under the parallel authority of the stratēgos of the naval theme of Samos, who drew crews and ships from there.

== Governors ==
- Sisinnios, strategos (fl. 741–742)
- Michael Lachanodrakon, (t. 766–782)
- Bardanes Tourkos, strategos (fl. 790s)
- Constantine Kontomytes, (fl. 841)
- Petronas, (t. 856–863)
- Symbatios the Armenian, strategos (fl. 866)
- Constantine Diogenes, strategos (fl. 1029)
- Giphardos, doux (1160s)
- Basil Chrysomalles, doux (1200s)
- John Angelos, doux and uncle of John III Doukas Vatatzes (c. 1234-1239)
- John Komnenos Kantakouzenos, doux and pinkernes (1244-1249)
- John Tornikes, doux (c.1243/1258)
- Alexios Philanthropenos (1293-1294)

== Sources ==
- Angold, Michael (1975). A Byzantine Government in Exile: Government and Society Under the Laskarids of Nicaea (1204-1261). Oxford: Oxford University Press. ISBN 0-19-821854-0.
- Haldon, John F. (1997). Byzantium in the Seventh Century: The Transformation of a Culture. Cambridge: Cambridge University Press. ISBN 978-0-521-31917-1.
- Haldon, John (1999). Warfare, State and Society in the Byzantine World, 565–1204. London: UCL Press. ISBN 1-85728-495-X.
- Kazhdan, Alexander, ed. (1991). The Oxford Dictionary of Byzantium. Oxford and New York: Oxford University Press. ISBN 0-19-504652-8.
- Lambakis, Stylianos (October 17, 2003). Θρακησίων Θέμα. Encyclopedia of the Hellenic World, Asia Minor (in Greek). Athens: Foundation of the Hellenic World.
- Nesbitt, John; Oikonomides, Nicolas, eds. (1996). Catalogue of Byzantine Seals at Dumbarton Oaks and in the Fogg Museum of Art, Volume 3: West, Northwest, and Central Asia Minor and the Orient. Vol. 3. Washington, DC: Dumbarton Oaks Research Library and Collection. ISBN 0-88402-250-1.
- Pertusi, A. (1952). Constantino Porfirogenito: De Thematibus (in Italian). Rome: Biblioteca Apostolica Vaticana.
- Treadgold, Warren (1988). The Byzantine Revival, 780–842. Stanford, California: Stanford University Press. ISBN 978-0-8047-1462-4.
- Treadgold, Warren T. (1995). Byzantium and Its Army, 284–1081. Stanford: Stanford University Press. ISBN 0-8047-3163-2.
- Treadgold, Warren (1997). A History of the Byzantine State and Society. Stanford, California: Stanford University Press. ISBN 0-8047-2630-2.
