= Armeniac Theme =

Medieval province of the Byzantine Empire

Theme of the Armeniacs Άρμενιακόν, θέμα Άρμενιάκων, Άρμενιακόν θέμα
- Theme of the Byzantine Empire
- 640s/660s–c. 1073
- The Byzantine themes of Asia Minor in circa 780, after the split of the Opsikion
- Capital: Amaseia
- Historical era: Middle Ages
  - Established: 640s/660s
  - Fall to Frankish mercenaries and then Seljuks.: 12 December 1073
- Today part of: Turkey

The Armeniac Theme (Greek: Ἀρμενιακόν [θέμα], Armeniakon [thema]), more properly the Theme of the Armeniacs (Greek: θέμα Ἀρμενιακῶν, thema Armeniakōn), was a Byzantine theme (a military-civilian province) located in northeastern Asia Minor (modern Turkey).

== History ==
The Armeniac Theme was one of the four original themes, established sometime in the mid-7th century out of the territory of Lesser Armenia (also known as "Armenia Minor"). Although the mention of a "George, tourmarchēs of the Armeniacs" in 629, during the Persian campaigns of Emperor Heraclius (r. 610–641), may suggest the existence of the theme at such an early date, the first unambiguous reference to it in literary sources occurs during the revolt of its general, Saborios, in 667/668. It is next mentioned on a seal of 717/718. Together with the other themes, it was created from the remnants of one of the field armies of the old East Roman army following the disastrous defeats suffered during the first wave of the Muslim conquests, a process probably complete by the late 640s. Thus, the army of the magister militum per Armeniae (the "Armeniacs") was withdrawn and settled in the areas of Pontus, Paphlagonia and Cappadocia, giving its name to the region.

The Byzantine themes of Asia Minor in circa 842, showing the fragmentation of the large original themes into smaller circumscriptions

The theme's capital was at Amaseia, and it was governed by a stratēgos, who ranked, together with the stratēgoi of the Anatolic and Thracesian themes, in the first tier of stratēgoi, drawing an annual salary of 40 gold pounds. In the 9th century, it fielded some 9,000 men and encompassed 17 fortresses. Its size and strategic importance on the Byzantine Empire's north-eastern frontier with the Muslims made its governor a powerful figure, and the theme's forces participated in several revolts in the 8th century. Consequently, in the 9th century it was broken up: the smaller provinces of Charsianon and Cappadocia were formed, first as kleisourai and later as full themes, along the border in the south and east, while in circa 819, the coastal themes of Paphlagonia and Chaldia were split off, followed later by the area of Koloneia (first under a doux, by 863 under a full strategos), leaving a rump Armeniac theme encompassing the western Pontus.

The theme remained in Byzantine hands until the late 11th century. In 1073, however, following the disastrous Battle of Manzikert, Frankish mercenaries under Roussel de Bailleul seized control and governed the region, until Byzantine authority was restored by future emperor Alexios Komnenos in 1075. Shortly after, the region was overrun by the Seljuk Turks, with only a few coastal forts holding out. The Komnenian emperors managed to recover the coastal regions for the Empire, but the Armeniac theme was not restored.

== Sources ==
- Beihammer, Alexander Daniel (2017). Byzantium and the Emergence of Muslim-Turkish Anatolia, ca. 1040-1130. Taylor & Francis. ISBN 978-1351983860.
- Gyftopoulou, Sofia (May 20, 2003). Αρμενιάκων Θέμα. Encyclopedia of the Hellenic World: Asia Minor (in Greek). Foundation of the Hellenic World.
- Haldon, John F. (1997). Byzantium in the Seventh Century: The Transformation of a Culture. Cambridge, United Kingdom: Cambridge University Press. ISBN 978-0-521-31917-1.
- Haldon, John (1999). Warfare, State and Society in the Byzantine World, 565–1204. London: UCL Press. ISBN 1-85728-495-X.
- Kazhdan, Alexander, ed. (1991). The Oxford Dictionary of Byzantium. Oxford and New York: Oxford University Press. ISBN 0-19-504652-8.
- Leveniotis, Georgios Athanasios (2007). Η πολιτική κατάρρευση του Βυζαντίου στην Ανατολή: το ανατολικό σύνορο και η κεντρική Μικρά Ασία κατά το β' ήμισυ του 11ου αι [The Political Collapse of Byzantium in the East: The Eastern Frontier and Central Asia Minor During the Second Half of the 11th Century] (PhD thesis) (in Greek). Aristotle University of Thessaloniki. doi:10.12681/eadd/19246. hdl:10442/hedi/19246.
- McGeer, Eric; Nesbitt, John; Oikonomides, Nicolas, eds. (2001). Catalogue of Byzantine Seals at Dumbarton Oaks and in the Fogg Museum of Art, Volume 4: The East. Washington, DC: Dumbarton Oaks Research Library and Collection. ISBN 0-88402-282-X.
- Pertusi, A. (1952). Constantino Porfirogenito: De Thematibus (in Italian). Rome: Biblioteca Apostolica Vaticana.
- Ragia, Efi (2009). "The Geography of the Provincial Administration of the Byzantine Empire (ca 600-1200): I.1. The Apothekai of Asia Minor (7th-8th c.)". Byzantine Symmeikta. 19: 195–245. doi:10.12681/byzsym.931.
- Treadgold, Warren T. (1995). Byzantium and Its Army, 284–1081. Stanford, California: Stanford University Press. ISBN 0-8047-3163-2.
