= Macedonia (theme) =

Province of the Byzantine Empire

Theme of Macedonia Μακεδονία, θέμα Μακεδονίας
- Theme of the Byzantine Empire
- 790s/802 – 11th century
- Map of Byzantine Greece c. 900, with the themes and major settlements.
- Capital: Adrianople
- Historical era: Middle Ages
  - Split from Thrace: 789/797 – 801/802
  - merged into other themes: Various times in late 10th and 11th centuries
- Today part of: Greece; Turkey; Bulgaria

The Theme of Macedonia (Greek: θέμα Μακεδονίας théma Makedonías) was a military-civilian province (theme) of the Byzantine Empire established between the late 8th century and the early 9th century. The theme of Macedonia had limited geographical relation to the previous Diocese of Macedonia and mainly lay in the southwestern parts of what previously was the adjacent Diocese of Thrace. Its capital was Adrianople.

== History ==
From the beginning of the 6th century, the former Diocese of Macedonia, then part of the Byzantine Empire became a subject to frequent raids by Slavic tribes which in the course of next centuries, resulted in drastic demographic and cultural changes. The Slavs organized themselves into "Sklaviniai", that continued to assault the Byzantine Empire, either independently, or aided by Bulgars or Avars during the 7th century. In the late 7th century, the Byzantines organized a massive expedition against the Slavs in the area. They subdued many Slavic tribes and established a new theme in the hinterland of Thessaloniki. Despite these temporary successes, the rule in the region was far from stable. The Empire instead resorted to withdraw its defense-line south along the Aegean coast, until the late 8th century.

Themes of the Byzantine Empire (year 1025 AD.)

As a consequence, a new theme called Macedonia was created between 789 (or 797) and 801/802 by the Empress Irene of Athens, from the older theme of Thrace. Sigillographic evidence shows that a tourma ("division") named "Macedonia" existed before, subordinated to the strategos of Thrace. The first known strategos of Macedonia, the patrikios John Aplakes, was mentioned in 813, but Theophanes the Confessor mentioned Leo, brother of the eunuch chamberlain Aetios, being appointed as the monostrategos ("single-general", placed in command over two or more themes) of Thrace and Macedonia already in 801/802. Its creation came in the aftermath of a series of military successes that had extended Byzantine reach over most of the wider region of Thrace, and was probably intended to make imperial control more efficient by entrusting the greatly expanded territory to two strategoi.

Although the theme was attested in the 960s, its absence in the Escorial Taktikon of c. 975 has led to the supposition that it may have been abolished and subsumed into the command of the new doux of Adrianople. However, the theme of Macedonia was attested again in 1006/7, and there is some sigillographic evidence to support its continued existence alongside the doukaton of Adrianople. In the late 10th century, as a result of the conquests of John I Tzimiskes (r. 969–976) and Basil II (r. 976–1025), the theme of Macedonia ceased being a border theme; to its north, it was bounded by new provinces centred on Philippopolis and Beroe, while to its south, the new theme of Boleron came into existence in the early 11th century.

Little is known of the provincial organization in the 12th century. In an imperial chrysobull to the Venetians dating to 1198, "Thrace and Macedonia" appear as a single territorial entity describing all of Thrace, but it was subdivided into smaller units centred on the major cities. The core area of the old theme of Macedonia was recorded as the "province of Adrianople and Didymoteichon" (provincia Adrianupoleos et Didimotichi).

== Geography and administration ==
The seat of the new theme was Adrianople (modern Edirne) in Thrace, and it comprised parts of modern Eastern Macedonia and Thrace, particularly the part of Western Thrace (in Greece), the western parts of Eastern Thrace (European Turkey), and the southern fringes of Northern Thrace (southern Bulgaria). The Arab geographers Ibn Khordadbeh (wrote c. 847) and Ibn al-Faqih (wrote c. 903), whose accounts are a major source on the Byzantine themes, mentioned that the theme of Macedonia (Maqaduniya) extended from the "Long Wall" (the Anastasian Wall) to the "lands of the Slavs" in the west, and from the Aegean and Marmara Seas to the borders of Bulgaria to the north. In later days, to the west it bounded the theme of Thessalonica and the later themes of Strymon and Boleron. Thus, the theme of Macedonia had no geographic relation to the core of the historical kingdom of Macedon.

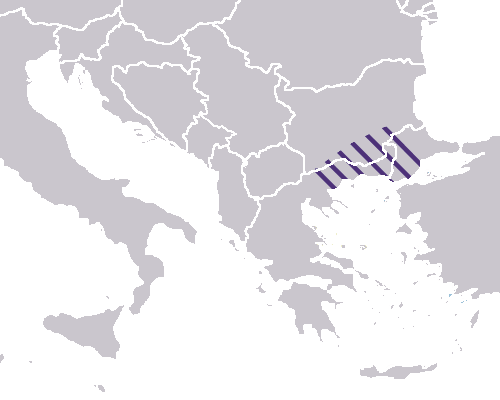
Approximate widest extent of the thema of Macedonia, superimposed on modern borders.

Being derived from the theme of Thrace, Macedonia was counted among the "Eastern" themes, which ranked higher in Byzantine hierarchy than the "Western" themes. In the late 9th and 10th centuries, its strategos ranked in the second tier of thematic governors, above even that of Thrace. He received an annual salary of 36 pounds of gold (2,592 nomismata), and, according to the account of Ibn al-Faqih, in the late 9th century controlled 5,000 troops. A number of tagmatic soldiers were also permanently stationed in the theme. Strymon, which was originally a kleisoura of Macedonia, was split off sometime in the early 9th century, taking some 2,000 men (according to the estimate of historian Warren Treadgold) along with it. As with other themes, at least some of the administrative posts of Macedonia were sometimes combined with those of Thrace, especially in the 11th century, where numerous strategoi and judges (kritai) are attested holding jurisdiction over both themes.

== Legacy ==
When Byzantine sources of the 9th to 12th centuries refer to "Macedonia", they mean the theme located mostly in the area of western Thrace. Hence, for instance, the emperor Basil I "the Macedonian" (r. 867–886) hailed from Thrace, and the Macedonian dynasty he founded was named after the theme of Macedonia.

== See also ==
- Diocese of Macedonia
- Diocese of Thrace

== Sources ==
- Kazhdan, Alexander, ed. (1991). The Oxford Dictionary of Byzantium. Oxford and New York: Oxford University Press. ISBN 0-19-504652-8.
- Nesbitt, John; Oikonomides, Nicolas, eds. (1991). Catalogue of Byzantine Seals at Dumbarton Oaks and in the Fogg Museum of Art, Volume 1: Italy, North of the Balkans, North of the Black Sea. Vol. 1. Washington, DC: Dumbarton Oaks Research Library and Collection. ISBN 0-88402-194-7.
- Pertusi, A. (1952). Constantino Porfirogenito: De Thematibus (in Italian). Rome: Biblioteca Apostolica Vaticana.
- Soustal, Peter (1991). Tabula Imperii Byzantini, Band 6: Thrakien (Thrakē, Rodopē und Haimimontos) (in German). Vienna: Verlag der Österreichischen Akademie der Wissenschaften. ISBN 978-3-7001-1898-5.
- Treadgold, Warren (1988). The Byzantine Revival, 780–842. Stanford, California: Stanford University Press. ISBN 978-0-8047-1462-4.
- Treadgold, Warren T. (1995). Byzantium and Its Army, 284–1081. Stanford, California: Stanford University Press. ISBN 0-8047-3163-2.
