= Demography of the Byzantine Empire =

The Demography of the Byzantine Empire concerns the composition, distribution, and social structure of the population of the Byzantine Empire, shaped by factors such as taxation, occupation, religion, and locality.

The vast majority of inhabitants lived in rural communities as peasants. Their agricultural labour underpinned the imperial economy, while soldiers formed a constant and highly visible presence through near-permanent warfare. The urban populations included the poor, artisans, teachers, clergy, and merchants, with Constantinople standing apart as a demographic and economic magnet. Christian institutions profoundly influenced social life, generating extensive networks of charity, education, and ecclesiastical administration. Although literacy, wealth, and legal status varied sharply by gender, region, and class, Byzantine society was marked by significant interaction between lay and clerical life, town and countryside, and state and economy. Together, these groups constituted a long-lived and adaptable population whose demographic patterns evolved over more than a millennium of imperial history.

== Population ==
The population of the Byzantine Empire encompassed all ethnic and tribal groups living there, mainly Rhomaioi (Greek-speaking Romans), but also Albanians, Armenians, Assyrians, Bulgarians, Goths, Jews, Kartvelians, Latini, Levantine Arabs, Serbs and Croats, Thracians, Thraco-Romans, Illyro-Romans,Tzans, Vlachs and other groups.

Scholars associate the Roman, Hellenic, and Christian imperial identities with the general population, but there is ongoing debate about how these and other regional identities blended together.

As many as 27 million people lived in the empire at its peak in 540, but this fell to 12 million by 800. Although plague and territorial losses to Arab Muslim invaders weakened the empire, it eventually recovered and by the near end of the Macedonian dynasty in 1025, the population is estimated to have been as high as 18 million. A few decades after the recapture of Constantinople in 1282, the empire's population was in the range of 3–5 million; by 1312, the number had dropped to 2 million. By the time the Ottoman Turks captured Constantinople, there were only 50,000 people in the city, one-tenth of its population in its prime.

== Society ==
While social mobility was not unknown in Byzantium the order of society was thought of as more enduring, with the average man regarding the court of Heaven to be the archetype of the imperial court in Constantinople. This society included various classes of people that were neither exclusive nor immutable. The most characteristic were the poor, the peasants, the soldiers, the teachers, entrepreneurs, and clergy.

=== The poor ===
According to a text dated to AD 533, a man was termed "poor" if he did not have 50 gold coins (aurei), which was a modest though not negligible sum. The Byzantines were heirs to the Greek concepts of charity for the sake of the polis; nevertheless it was the Christian concepts attested in the Bible that animated their giving habits, and specifically the examples of Basil of Caesarea (who is the Greek equivalent of Santa Claus), Gregory of Nyssa, and John Chrysostom. The number of the poor fluctuated in the many centuries of Byzantium's existence, but they provided a constant supply of muscle power for the building projects and rural work. Their numbers apparently increased in the late fourth and early fifth centuries as barbarian raids and a desire to avoid taxation pushed rural populations into cities.

Since Homeric times, there were several categories of poverty: the ptochos (πτωχός, "passive poor") was lower than the penes (πένης, "active poor"). They formed the majority of the infamous Constantinopolitan mob whose function was similar to the mob of the First Rome. However, while there are instances of riots attributed to the poor, the majority of civil disturbances were specifically attributable to the various factions of the Hippodrome like the Greens and Blues. The poor made up a non-negligible percentage of the population, but they influenced the Christian society of Byzantium to create a large network of hospitals (iatreia, ιατρεία) and almshouses, and a religious and social model largely justified by the existence of the poor and born out of the Christian transformation of classical society.

=== Peasantry ===
Byzantine state and society relied on the Hellenistic system of joint tax liability due to the easy handling, fast and simple revenue for the state from the different towns and villages chorio, komai mostly made up of peasants, who were the main income. There are no reliable figures as to the numbers of the peasantry, yet it is widely assumed that the vast majority of Byzantine Greeks lived in rural and agrarian areas. In the Taktika of Emperor Leo VI the Wise (r. 886–912), the two professions defined as the backbone of the state are the peasantry (geōrgikē, γεωργική, "farmers") and the soldiers (stratiōtikē, στρατιωτική).

Peasants lived mostly in villages, whose name changed slowly from the classical kome (κώμη) to the modern chorio (χωριό). While agriculture and herding were the dominant occupations of villagers they were not the only ones. There are records for the small town of Lampsakos, situated on the eastern shore of the Hellespont, which out of 173 households classifies 113 as peasant and 60 as urban, which indicate other kinds of ancillary activities.

The Treatise on Taxation, preserved in the Biblioteca Marciana in Venice, distinguishes between three types of rural settlements, the chorion (Greek: χωρίον) or village, the agridion (Greek: αγρίδιον) or hamlet, and the proasteion (Greek: προάστειον) or estate. According to a 14th-century survey of the village of Aphetos, donated to the monastery of Chilandar, the average size of a landholding is only 3.5 modioi (0.08 ha). Taxes placed on rural populations included the kapnikon (Greek: καπνικόν) or hearth tax, the synone (Greek: συνονή) or cash payment frequently affiliated with the kapnikon, the ennomion (Greek: εννόμιον) or pasture tax, and the aerikon (Greek: αέρικον, meaning "of the air") which depended on the village's population and ranged between 4 and 20 gold coins annually.

Their diet consisted of mainly grains and beans and in fishing communities fish was usually substituted for meat. Bread, wine, and olives were important staples of Byzantine diet with soldiers on campaign eating double-baked and dried bread called paximadion (Greek: παξιμάδιον). As in antiquity and modern times, the most common cultivations in the choraphia (Greek: χωράφια) were olive groves and vineyards. While Liutprand of Cremona, a visitor from Italy, found Greek wine irritating as it was often flavoured with resin (retsina) most other Westerners admired Greek wines, Cretan in particular being famous.

While both hunting and fishing were common, the peasants mostly hunted to protect their herds and crops. Apiculture, the keeping of bees, was as highly developed in Byzantium as it had been in Ancient Greece. Aside from agriculture, the peasants also laboured in the crafts, fiscal inventories mentioning smiths (Greek: χαλκεύς, chalkeus), tailors (Greek: ράπτης, rhaptes), and cobblers (Greek: τζαγγάριος, tzangarios).

=== Soldiers ===
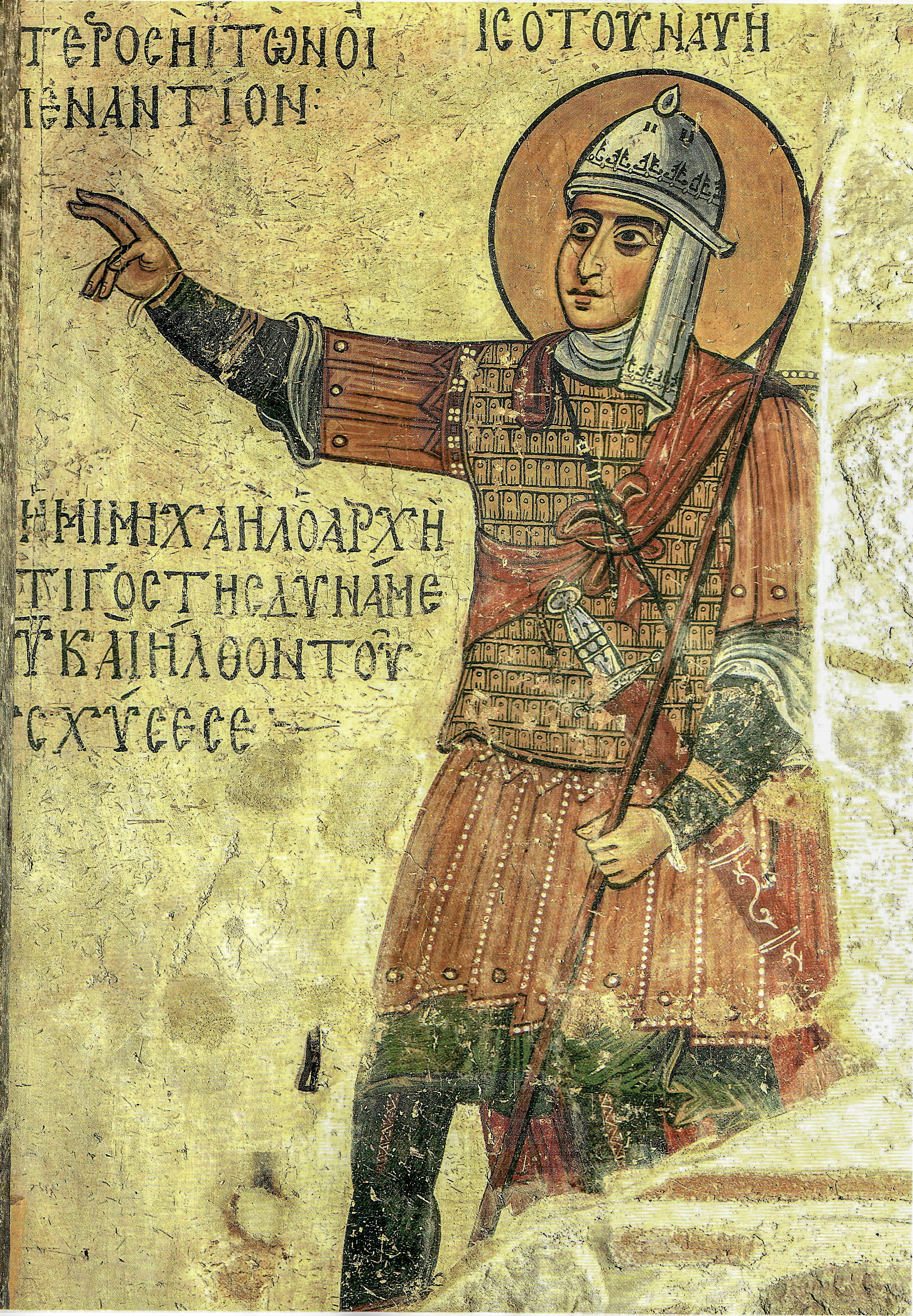
Joshua portrayed as a soldier wearing the lamellar klivanion cuirass and a straight spathion sword (Hosios Loukas).

The Byzantine Empire at the death of Basil II in 1025

During the Byzantine millennium, hardly a year passed without a military campaign. Soldiers were a normal part of everyday life, much more so than in modern Western societies. While it is difficult to draw a distinction between Roman and Byzantine soldiers from an organizational aspect, it is easier to do so in terms of their social profile. The military handbooks known as the Taktika continued a Hellenistic and Roman tradition, and contain a wealth of information about the appearance, customs, habits, and life of the soldiers.

As with the peasantry, many soldiers performed ancillary activities, like medics and technicians. Selection for military duty was annual with yearly call-ups and great stock was placed on military exercises, during the winter months, which formed a large part of a soldier's life.

Until the 11th century, the majority of the conscripts were from rural areas, while the conscription of craftsmen and merchants is still an open question. From then on, professional recruiting replaced conscription, and the increasing use of mercenaries in the army was ruinous for the treasury. From the 10th century onwards, there were laws connecting land ownership and military service. While the state never allotted land for obligatory service, soldiers could and did use their pay to buy landed estates, and taxes would be decreased or waived in some cases. What the state did allocate to soldiers, however, from the 12th century onwards, were the tax revenues from some estates called pronoiai (πρόνοιαι). As in antiquity, the basic food of the soldier remained the dried biscuit bread, though its name had changed from boukelaton (βουκελάτον) to paximadion.

=== Teachers ===
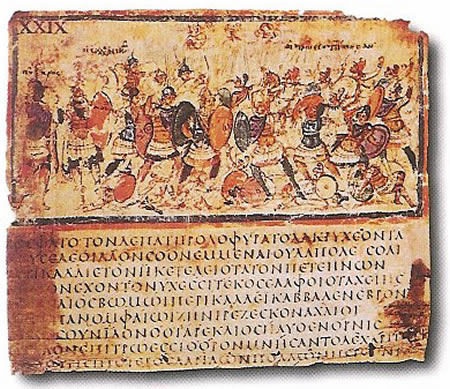
A page of 5th or 6th century Iliad like the one a grammarian might possess.

Byzantine education was the product of an ancient Greek educational tradition that stretched back to the 5th century BC. It comprised a tripartite system of education that, taking shape during the Hellenistic era, was maintained, with inevitable changes, up until the fall of Constantinople. The stages of education were the elementary school, where pupils ranged from six to ten years, secondary school, where pupils ranged from ten to sixteen, and higher education.

Elementary education was widely available throughout most of the Byzantine Empire's existence, in towns and occasionally in the countryside. This, in turn, ensured that literacy was much more widespread than in Western Europe, at least until the twelfth century. Secondary education was confined to the larger cities while higher education was the exclusive provenance of Constantinople.

Though not a society of mass literacy like modern societies, Byzantine society was a profoundly literate one. Based on information from an extensive array of Byzantine documents from different periods (i.e. homilies, Ekloge ton nomon, etc.), Robert Browning concluded that, while books were luxury items and functional literacy (reading and writing) was widespread, but largely confined to cities and monasteries, access to elementary education was provided in most cities for much of the time and sometimes in villages. Nikolaos Oikonomides, focusing on 13th-century Byzantine literacy in Western Asia Minor, states that Byzantine society had "a completely literate church, an almost completely literate aristocracy, some literate horsemen, rare literate peasants and almost completely illiterate women." Ioannis Stouraitis estimates that the percentage of the Empire's population with some degree of literacy was at most 15–20% based primarily on the mention of illiterate Byzantine tourmarchai in the Tactica of Emperor Leo VI the Wise (r. 886–912).

In Byzantium, the elementary school teacher occupied a low social position and taught mainly from simple fairy tale books (Aesop's Fables were often used). However, the grammarian and rhetorician, teachers responsible for the following two phases of education, were more respected. These used classical Greek texts like Homer's Iliad or Odyssey and much of their time was taken with detailed word-for-word explication. Books were rare and very expensive and likely only possessed by teachers who dictated passages to students.

=== Women ===
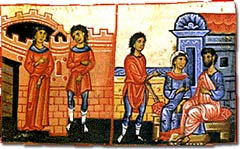
Scenes of marriage and family life in Constantinople.

Women had the same socio-economic status as men, but faced legal discrimination and limitations in economic opportunities and vocations. Prohibited from serving as soldiers or holding political office, and restricted from serving as deaconesses in the Church from the 7th century onwards, women were mostly assigned labour-intensive household responsibilities. They worked in the food and textile industries, as medical staff, in public baths, in retail, and were practising members of artisan guilds. They also worked in entertainment, tavern keeping, and prostitution, a class where some saints and empresses may have originated from. Prostitution was widespread, and attempts were made to limit it, especially during Justinian's reign under the influence of Theodora. Women participated in public life, engaging in social events and protests. Women's rights were better in the empire than in comparable societies. Western European and American women took until the 19th century to surpass them.

Women have tended to be overlooked in Byzantine studies as Byzantine society left few records about them. Women were disadvantaged in some aspects of their legal status and in their access to education, and limited in their freedom of movement. The life of a Byzantine Greek woman could be divided into three phases: girlhood, motherhood, and widowhood.

Childhood was brief and perilous, even more so for girls than boys. Parents would celebrate the birth of a boy twice as much and there is some evidence of female infanticide (i.e. roadside abandonment and suffocation), though it was contrary to both civil and canon law. Educational opportunities for girls were few: they did not attend regular schools but were taught in groups at home by tutors. With few exceptions, education was limited to literacy and the Bible; a famous exception is the princess Anna Komnene (1083–1153), whose Alexiad displays a great depth of erudition, and the renowned 9th century Byzantine poet and composer Kassiani. The majority of a young girl's daily life would be spent in household and agrarian chores, preparing herself for marriage.

For most girls, childhood came to an end with the onset of puberty, which was followed shortly after by betrothal and marriage. Although marriage arranged by the family was the norm, romantic love was not unknown. Most women bore many children but few survived infancy, and grief for the loss of a loved one was an inalienable part of life. The main form of birth control was abstinence, and while there is evidence of contraception it seems to have been mainly used by prostitutes.

Due to prevailing norms of modesty, women would wear clothing that covered the whole of their body except their hands. While women among the poor sometimes wore sleeveless tunics, most women were obliged to cover even their hair with the long maphorion (μαφόριον) veil. Women of means, however, spared no expense in adorning their clothes with exquisite jewelry and fine silk fabrics. Divorces were hard to obtain even though there were laws permitting them. Husbands would often beat their wives, though the reverse was not unknown, as in Theodore Prodromos's description of a battered husband in the Ptochoprodromos poems.

Although female life expectancy in Byzantium was lower than that of men, due to death in childbirth, wars and the fact that men married younger, female widowhood was still fairly common. Still, some women were able to circumvent societal strictures and work as traders, artisans, abbots, entertainers, and scholars.

=== Entrepreneurs ===
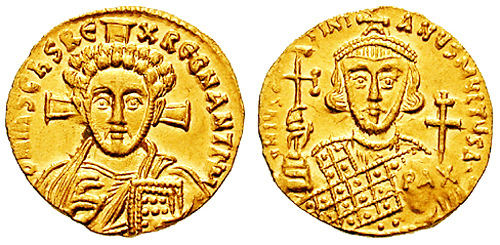
Gold solidus of Justinian II 4.42 grams (0.156 oz), struck after 692.

The traditional image of Byzantine Greek merchants as unenterprising benefactors of state aid is beginning to change for that of mobile, pro-active agents. The merchant class, particularly that of Constantinople, became a force of its own that could, at times, even threaten the Emperor as it did in the eleventh and twelfth centuries. This was achieved through efficient use of credit and other monetary innovations. Merchants invested surplus funds in financial products called chreokoinonia (χρεοκοινωνία), the equivalent and perhaps ancestor of the later Italian commenda.

Eventually, the purchasing power of Byzantine merchants became such that it could influence prices in markets as far afield as Cairo and Alexandria. In reflection of their success, emperors gave merchants the right to become members of the Senate, that is to integrate themselves with the ruling elite. This had an end by the end of the eleventh century when political machinations allowed the landed aristocracy to secure the throne for a century and more. Following that phase, however, the enterprising merchants bounced back and wielded real clout during the time of the Third Crusade.

The reason Byzantine Greek merchants have often been neglected in historiography is not that they were any less able than their ancient or modern Greek colleagues in matters of trade. It rather originated with the way history was written in Byzantium, which was often under the patronage of their competitors, the court, and land aristocracy. The fact that they were eventually surpassed by their Italian rivals is attributable to the privileges sought and acquired by the Crusader States within the Levant and the dominant maritime violence of the Italians.

=== Clergy ===
Unlike in Western Europe where priests were clearly demarcated from the laymen, the clergy of the Eastern Roman Empire remained in close contact with the rest of society. Readers and subdeacons were drawn from the laity and expected to be at least twenty years of age while priests and bishops had to be at least 30. Unlike the Latin church, the Byzantine church allowed married priests and deacons, as long as they were married before ordination. Bishops, however, were required to be unmarried.

While the religious hierarchy mirrored the Empire's administrative divisions, the clergy were more ubiquitous than the emperor's servants. The issue of caesaropapism, while usually associated with the Byzantine Empire, is now understood to be an oversimplification of actual conditions in the Empire. By the fifth century, the Patriarch of Constantinople was recognized as first among equals of the four eastern Patriarchs and as of equal status with the Pope in Rome.

The ecclesiastical provinces were called eparchies and were headed by archbishops or metropolitans who supervised their subordinate bishops or episkopoi. For most people, however, it was their parish priest or papas (from the Greek word for "father") that was the most recognizable face of the clergy.

== Slavery ==
During the 3rd century, 10–15% of the population was enslaved (numbering around 3 million in the east). Youval Rotman calls the changes to slavery during this period "different degrees of unfreedom". Previous roles fulfilled by slaves became high-demand free market professions (like tutors), and the state encouraged the coloni, tenants bound to the land, as a new legal category between freemen and slaves. From 294 the enslavement of children was progressively forbidden; Honorius (r. 393–423) began freeing enslaved prisoners of war, and from the 9th century, emperors freed the slaves of conquered people. Christianity as an institution had no direct impact, but by the 6th century it was a bishop's duty to ransom Christians, there were established limits on trading them, and state policies prohibited the enslavement of Christians; these changes shaped Byzantine slave-holding from the 8th century onwards. Non-Christians could still be enslaved, and prices remained stable until 1300, when prices for adult slaves, particularly women, started rising.

== Socio-economic ==
Agriculture was the main basis of taxation and the state sought to bind everyone to land for productivity. Most land holdings were small and medium-sized lots around villages, and family farms were the primary source of agriculture. The coloni, sometimes called proto-serfs, were free citizens, though historians continue to debate their exact status.

The Ekloge ton nomon laws of 726/741 made marriage a Christian institution and no longer a private contract, where it evolved alongside the increased rights of slaves and the change in power relations. Marriage was considered an institution required to sustain the population, transfer property rights, and support the elderly of the family; the Empress Theodora had also said it was needed to restrict sexual hedonism. Women usually married between the ages of 15 and 20, and the average family had two children. Divorce could be done by mutual consent but was restricted over time, for example, only being allowed if a married person was joining a convent.

Inheritance rights were well developed, including for all women. The historian Anthony Kaldellis suggests that these rights may have been what prevented the emergence of large properties and a hereditary nobility capable of intimidating the state. The prevalence of widows (estimated at 20%) meant women often controlled family assets as heads of households and businesses, contributing to the rise of some empresses to power. Women played significant roles as taxpayers, landowners, and petitioners, often seeking the resolution of property disputes in court.

=== Education ===
Education was voluntary and required financial means, so the most literate people were often those associated with the church. Primary education focused on teaching foundational subjects like reading, writing, and arithmetic whereas secondary school focused on the trivium and quadrivium as their curriculum. The Imperial University of Constantinople was formed in 425, and refounded in 1046 as a centre for law.

== Bibliography ==
- Browning, Robert (1989). History, Language and Literacy in the Byzantine World. Northampton: Variorum Reprints. ISBN 9780860782476.
- Browning, Robert (1993). "Further Reflections on Literacy in the Byzantine World". In John S. Langdon; et al. (eds.). ΤΟ ΕΛΛΗΝΙΚΟΝ: Studies in Honor of Speros Vryonis, Jr: Vol. 1: Hellenic Antiquity and Byzantium. New Rochelle, NY: Artistide D. Caratzas. pp. 63–84.
- Cavallo, Guglielmo (1997). The Byzantines. Chicago, Illinois: University of Chicago Press. ISBN 978-0-226-09792-3.
- Constantelos, Demetrios (1998). Christian Hellenism: Essays and Studies in Continuity and Change. Studies in the Social & Religious History of the Medieval Greek World. Vol. 3. New Rochelle: Aristides D. Caratzas. ISBN 978-0-89241-588-5.
- Cormack, Robin; Haldon, John F.; Jeffreys, Elizabeth, eds. (2008). The Oxford Handbook of Byzantine Studies. Oxford: Oxford University Press. ISBN 978-0-1917-4352-8.
  - Stathakopoulos, Dionysios Ch. "Population, Demography, and Disease". In Cormack, Haldon & Jeffreys (2008), pp. 309–316.
  - Harvey, Alan. "The Village". In Cormack, Haldon & Jeffreys (2008), pp. 328–334.
  - Brandes, Wolfram. "Revenues and Expenditure". In Cormack, Haldon & Jeffreys (2008), pp. 562–570.
  - Markopoulos, Athanasios. "Education". In Cormack, Haldon & Jeffreys (2008), pp. 785–795.
- Garland, Lynda (1999). Byzantine Empresses: Women and Power in Byzantium, AD 527–1204. London: Routledge. ISBN 978-0-415-14688-3. Archived from the original on 16 January 2021.
- Garland, Lynda (2006). Byzantine Women: Varieties of Experience, 800–1200. Publications for the Centre for Hellenic Studies, King's College, London. Aldershot, Burlington: Ashgate. ISBN 978-0-7546-5737-8.
- Grierson, Philip (1999). Byzantine Coinage. Washington, DC: Dumbarton Oaks. ISBN 978-0-88402-274-9.
- Grosdidier de Matons, Jean (1967). "La Femme dans l'Empire Byzantin" [Women in the Byzantine Empire]. In Grimal, Pierre (ed.). Histoire Mondiale de la Femme: Préhistoire et antiquité [World History of Women: Prehistory and Antinquity] (in French). Vol. I. Paris: Nouvelle librairie de France. pp. 11–43. OCLC 490034792.
- Harper, Kyle (2010). "Slave Prices in Late Antiquity (and in the Very Long Term)". Historia: Zeitschrift für Alte Geschichte. 59 (2): 206–238. doi:10.25162/historia-2010-0013. ISSN 0018-2311. JSTOR 27809564. S2CID 160720781.
- Harris, Jonathan (2017). Constantinople: Capital of Byzantium (Second ed.). London: Bloomsbury Academic. ISBN 978-1-4742-5466-3.
- Harvey, Alan (1989). Economic Expansion in the Byzantine Empire, 900–1200. Cambridge: Cambridge University Press. ISBN 978-0-521-52190-1.
- Jeffreys, Michael. "Literacy". In Cormack, Haldon & Jeffreys (2008), pp. 796–802.
- Lavan, Myles (2016). "The Spread of Roman Citizenship, 14–212 ce: Quantification in the Face of High Uncertainty". Past & Present (230): 3–46. doi:10.1093/pastj/gtv043. hdl:10023/12646. ISSN 0031-2746.
- Louth, Andrew (2005). "The Byzantine Empire in the Seventh Century". In Fouracre, Paul (ed.). New Cambridge Medieval History. Vol. 1: c. 500 – c. 700. pp. 289–316. ISBN 9781139053938.
- Mango, Cyril A., ed. (2002). The Oxford History of Byzantium. Oxford: Oxford University Press. ISBN 978-0-19-814098-6.
  - Jeffreys, Elizabeth; Mango, Cyril. "Towards a Franco-Greek Culture". In Mango (2002), pp. 294–305.
- ——— (2023). The New Roman Empire: A History of Byzantium. New York: Oxford University Press. ISBN 978-0197549322.
- Kazhdan, Alexander (1990a). "Byzantine Hagiography and Sex in the Fifth to Twelfth Centuries". Dumbarton Oaks Papers. 44: 131–143. doi:10.2307/1291623. ISSN 0070-7546. JSTOR 1291623.
- Kazhdan, Alexander Petrovich; Wharton, Annabel Jane (1990). Change in Byzantine Culture in the Eleventh and Twelfth Centuries. Transformation of the Classical Heritage. Vol. 7. Berkeley: University of California Press. ISBN 9780520069626.
- Karras, Valerie A. (2004). "Female Deacons in the Byzantine Church". Church History. 73 (2): 272–316. doi:10.1017/S000964070010928X. ISSN 0009-6407. JSTOR 4146526. S2CID 161817885. Archived from the original on 5 March 2016.
- "History of Europe: The Romans". Encyclopædia Britannica. United States: Encyclopædia Britannica, Inc. 2009. Online Edition.
- Laiou, Angeliki E.; Morrisson, Cécile (2007). The Byzantine Economy. Cambridge: Cambridge University Press. ISBN 978-0-521-84978-4.
- Oikonomides, Nikolaos (1993). "Literacy in Thirteenth-century Byzantium: An Example from Western Asia Minor". In John S. Langdon; et al. (eds.). ΤΟ ΕΛΛΗΝΙΚΟΝ: Studies in Honor of Speros Vryonis, Jr: Vol. 1: Hellenic Antiquity and Byzantium. New Rochelle, NY: Artistide D. Caratzas. pp. 253–65.
- Lenski, Noel (2021-08-12). "Slavery in the Byzantine Empire". In Perry, Craig; Eltis, David; Engerman, Stanley L.; Richardson, David (eds.). The Cambridge World History of Slavery. Vol. 2: AD 500–AD 1420. Cambridge: Cambridge University Press. pp. 453–481. doi:10.1017/9781139024723.019. ISBN 978-1-139-02472-3.
- Pohl, Walter; Gantner, Clemens; Grifoni, Cinzia; Pollheimer-Mohaupt, Marianne, eds. (2018-06-25). Transformations of Romanness: Early Medieval Regions and Identities. De Gruyter. doi:10.1515/9783110598384. hdl:10278/3702393. ISBN 978-3-11-059838-4.
  - Pohl, Walter. "1 Introduction: Early medieval Romanness – a multiple identity". In Pohl et al. (2018), pp. 3-39.
  - Stouraitis, Ioannis. "Byzantine Romanness: From geopolitical to ethnic conceptions". In Pohl et al. (2018), pp. 123-39.
- Rautman, Marcus (2006). Daily Life in the Byzantine Empire. Westport, CT: Greenwood Press. ISBN 978-0-313-32437-6.
- Rosser, John H. (2011). Historical Dictionary of Byzantium. Lanham, Maryland: Scarecrow Press. ISBN 9780810874770.
- Rotman, Youval (2009). Byzantine Slavery and the Mediterranean World. Cambridge, Massachusetts: Harvard University Press. ISBN 978-0-674-03611-6.
- ——— (2022). Slaveries of the First Millennium. Amsterdam: Amsterdam University Press. doi:10.2307/j.ctv2175h0p. ISBN 978-1-64189-172-1. JSTOR j.ctv2175h0p.
- Rotman, Youval (2010-07-02). "Review of: Response: Rotman on Lenski on Youval Rotman, Byzantine Slavery and the Mediterranean World". Bryn Mawr Classical Review. ISSN 1055-7660. Archived from the original on 9 January 2024.
- Stathakopoulos, Dionysios Ch. (2023). A Short History of the Byzantine Empire. Short Histories. London: Bloomsbury Academic. ISBN 978-1-350-23340-9.
- Stephenson, Paul, ed. (2010). The Byzantine World. London: Routledge. ISBN 978-1-136-72787-0.
- Stouraitis, Ioannis (2014). "Roman Identity in Byzantium: A Critical Approach". Byzantinische Zeitschrift. 107 (1): 175–220. doi:10.1515/bz-2014-0009.
- Stewart, Michael Edward; Parnell, David Alan; Whately, Conor, eds. (2022). The Routledge Handbook on Identity in Byzantium. The Routledge History Handbooks. New York: Routledge. ISBN 978-0-367-14341-1.
  - Stewart, Michael. "Finding Byzantium". In Stewart, Parnell & Whately (2022), pp. 1–15.
  - Muthesius, Anna. "Imperial identity: Byzantine silks, art, autocracy, theocracy, and the image of the Basileia". In Stewart, Parnell & Whately (2022), pp. 81-103.
  - Kaldellis, Anthony (2022b). "Provincial identities in Byzantium". In Stewart, Parnell & Whately (2022), pp. 248-261.
- Talbot, Alice-Mary (1997). "Chapter 5: Women". In Cavallo, Guglielmo (ed.). The Byzantines. Chicago: University of Chicago Press. pp. 117–143. ISBN 978-0-226-09791-6.
- Treadgold, Warren T. (1997b). A History of the Byzantine State and Society. Redwood City: Stanford University Press. ISBN 978-0-8047-7937-1.
