= Strymon (theme) =

Province of the Byzantine Empire

Theme of Strymon Στρυμών, θέμα Στρυμόνος
- Theme of the Byzantine Empire
- 840s–1204 1246–1345
- Map of Byzantine Greece ca. 900 AD, with the themes and major settlements.
- Capital: Serres
- Historical era: Middle Ages
  - Established: probably 840s
  - Conquered by Latins: 1204
  - Nicaean recovery: 1246
  - Serres conquered by Serbs.: 1345
- Today part of: Greece

The Theme of Strymon (Greek: θέμα Στρυμόνος) was a Byzantine military-civilian province (theme) located in modern Greek Macedonia, with the city of Serres as its capital. Founded probably by the mid-to-late 9th century, its history as an administrative history was chequered, being variously split up and/or united with neighbouring themes.

== Location ==
The theme covered the region between the Strymon and Nestos rivers, between the Rhodope mountains and the Aegean Sea. The area was strategically important. Not only did the theme control the exits to the mountain passes from the Slav-dominated interior of the Balkans into the coastal plains of Macedonia, but it was transversed by the great Via Egnatia highway, which linked Byzantine-controlled Thrace with Thessalonica, the Empire's second-largest city. The region was peopled predominantly with Slavs from the late 7th century on, and retained a significant Slavic population at least until the 11th century. Its main cities were Serres, Philippi, Christoupolis and Chrysopolis, while it may also initially have included the cities of Xanthi and Mosynopolis east of the Strymon.

== History ==
In the 8th century, Strymon was a kleisoura of Macedonia. The exact date of its establishment as an independent theme is unknown, but it probably dates to the first half of the 9th century. A passage in Theophanes the Confessor dated to 809 may imply its existence already at that date, but its governor is not included in the list of offices known as the Taktikon Uspensky of c. 842. The strategos of Strymon first appears in the 899 Kletorologion, although a series of seals naming both archontes and strategoi of Strymon are known from the second quarter of the 9th century. In addition, the bishop of Serres was elevated to an archbishop at about the same time, a possible indication of the establishment of a thematic capital there. Several authors like the French Byzantinist Paul Lemerle support its creation in the late 840s, during Theoktistos's anti-Slavic campaigns, but historian Warren Treadgold considers it to have become a full theme in c. 896, to counter the threat of the Bulgarian tsar Symeon I (r. 893–927).

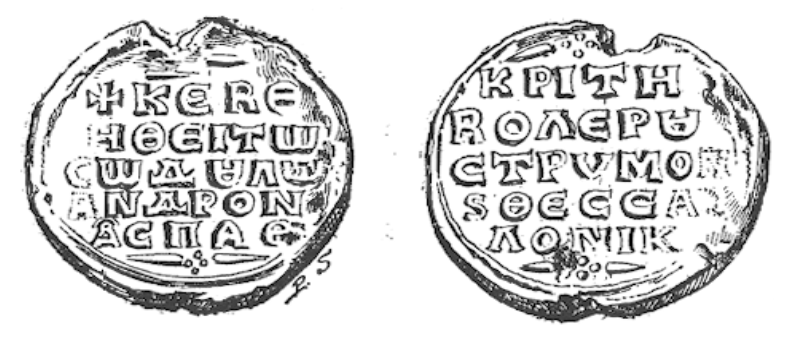
Seal of Andronikos, protospatharios and krites of Boleron, Strymon, and Thessalonica

In the late 10th century, the theme was divided in two parts: Strymon proper, also known as Chryseuba or Chrysaba (Χρυσεύβα/Χρυσάβα, according to the Greek scholar Nikolaos Oikonomides a Hellenized form of "Krushevo", modern Achladochori), and the theme of New Strymon (Νέος Στρυμών). The latter is known only through the Escorial Taktikon of c. 975. Oikonomides identifies it either with the portion of the old theme east of the Nestos, which was later raised to a separate theme as Boleron (Greek: Βολερόν), or with a northern portion along the upper Strymon, possibly acquired after Emperor John I Tzimiskes's (r. 969–976) conquest of Bulgaria in 971. Towards the end of the 10th century, the theme of Strymon appears to have been united with that of Thessalonica and perhaps also Drougoubiteia, while in the 11th century it appears united with Boleron.

The theme continued in existence until the dissolution of the Byzantine Empire by the Fourth Crusade (1204), when it became part of the short-lived Latin Kingdom of Thessalonica. In 1246, after the Nicaean emperor John III Vatatzes (r. 1221–1254) conquered Macedonia, the theme was re-established as a separate province. In the 14th century, however, it again appears as combined with other provinces such as the themes of Boleron and Thessalonica or as the theme of "Serres and Strymon". It was permanently dissolved after the region's conquest by the Serbian Empire in the 1340s, during a Byzantine civil war.

== Sources ==
- Bartusis, Mark C. (1997). The Late Byzantine Army: Arms and Society 1204–1453. Philadelphia, Pennsylvania: University of Pennsylvania Press. ISBN 0-8122-1620-2.
- Chatziantoniou, Elisavet (2012–2013). "Παρατηρήσεις σχετικά με την οικονομική διοίκηση του θέματος Βολερού, Στρυμόνος και Θεσσαλονίκης (11ος αι.)" [Observations regarding the Fiscal Administration of the theme of Boleros, Strymon, and Thessalonike (11th century)] (PDF). Byzantiaka (in Greek). 30. Thessaloniki: Hellenic Historical Society: 149–193. Archived from the original (PDF) on 2016-03-04.
- Fine, John V. A. Jr. (1991) [1983]. The Early Medieval Balkans: A Critical Survey from the Sixth to the Late Twelfth Century. Ann Arbor: University of Michigan Press. ISBN 0-472-08149-7.
- Kazhdan, Alexander, ed. (1991). The Oxford Dictionary of Byzantium. Oxford and New York: Oxford University Press. ISBN 0-19-504652-8.
- Nesbitt, John W.; Oikonomides, Nicolas, eds. (1991). Catalogue of Byzantine Seals at Dumbarton Oaks and in the Fogg Museum of Art, Volume 1: Italy, North of the Balkans, North of the Black Sea. Washington, District of Columbia: Dumbarton Oaks Research Library and Collection. ISBN 0-88402-194-7.
- Obolensky, Dimitri (1974) [1971]. The Byzantine Commonwealth: Eastern Europe, 500-1453. London: Cardinal. ISBN 9780351176449.
- Oikonomides, Nicolas (1972). Les Listes de Préséance Byzantines des IXe et Xe Siècles (in French). Paris, France: Editions du Centre National de la Recherche Scientifique.
- Pertusi, A. (1952). Constantino Porfirogenito: De Thematibus (in Italian). Rome: Biblioteca Apostolica Vaticana.
- Treadgold, Warren T. (1995). Byzantium and Its Army, 284–1081. Stanford, California: Stanford University Press. ISBN 0-8047-3163-2.
