= Charpezikion =

Byzantine fortress and small province

Charpezikion (Greek: Χαρπεζίκιον) was a Byzantine fortress and small province (theme) in the 10th century.

The fortress of Charpezikion is identified with Çarpezik Kalesi, east of the Euphrates River, while some earlier scholars identify it with Harpuzik, west of the Euphrates, some 16 km northwest of Arapgir.

The fortress became the seat of a namesake military province (theme) during the conquests of John Kourkouas in the region. Due to a confusion in the transcription of the manuscript of De Ceremoniis, several modern sources mention that its first appearance in the sources was in 935, in the context of a Byzantine expedition into southern Italy, but Nicolas Oikonomides corrected the actual event to the campaign against the Emirate of Crete in 949.

It had a small garrison of only 905 men, but a disproportionate number of higher officers: according to the so-called Escorial Taktikon, compiled sometime in 971/975, it had no fewer than 22 "great" and 47 "junior" tourmarchai. Its mention in the Escorial Taktikon, where it is listed between the themes of Tephrike and Romanopolis, is the last occurrence in the sources, meaning that the theme probably ceased to exist shortly after.

== Sources ==
- Hild, Friedrich; Restle, Marcell (1981). Tabula Imperii Byzantini, Band 2: Kappadokien (Kappadokia, Charsianon, Sebasteia und Lykandos) (in German). Vienna: Verlag der Österreichischen Akademie der Wissenschaften. ISBN 978-3-7001-0401-8.
- Kazhdan, Alexander, ed. (1991). The Oxford Dictionary of Byzantium. Oxford and New York: Oxford University Press. ISBN 0-19-504652-8.
- Oikonomides, Nicolas (1972). Les listes de préséance byzantines des IXe et Xe siècles (in French). Paris.
