= Sebasteia (theme) =

Province of the Byzantine Empire

Theme of Sebasteia Σεβαστεία, θέμα Σεβαστείας
- Theme of the Byzantine Empire
- 911 – ca. 1074
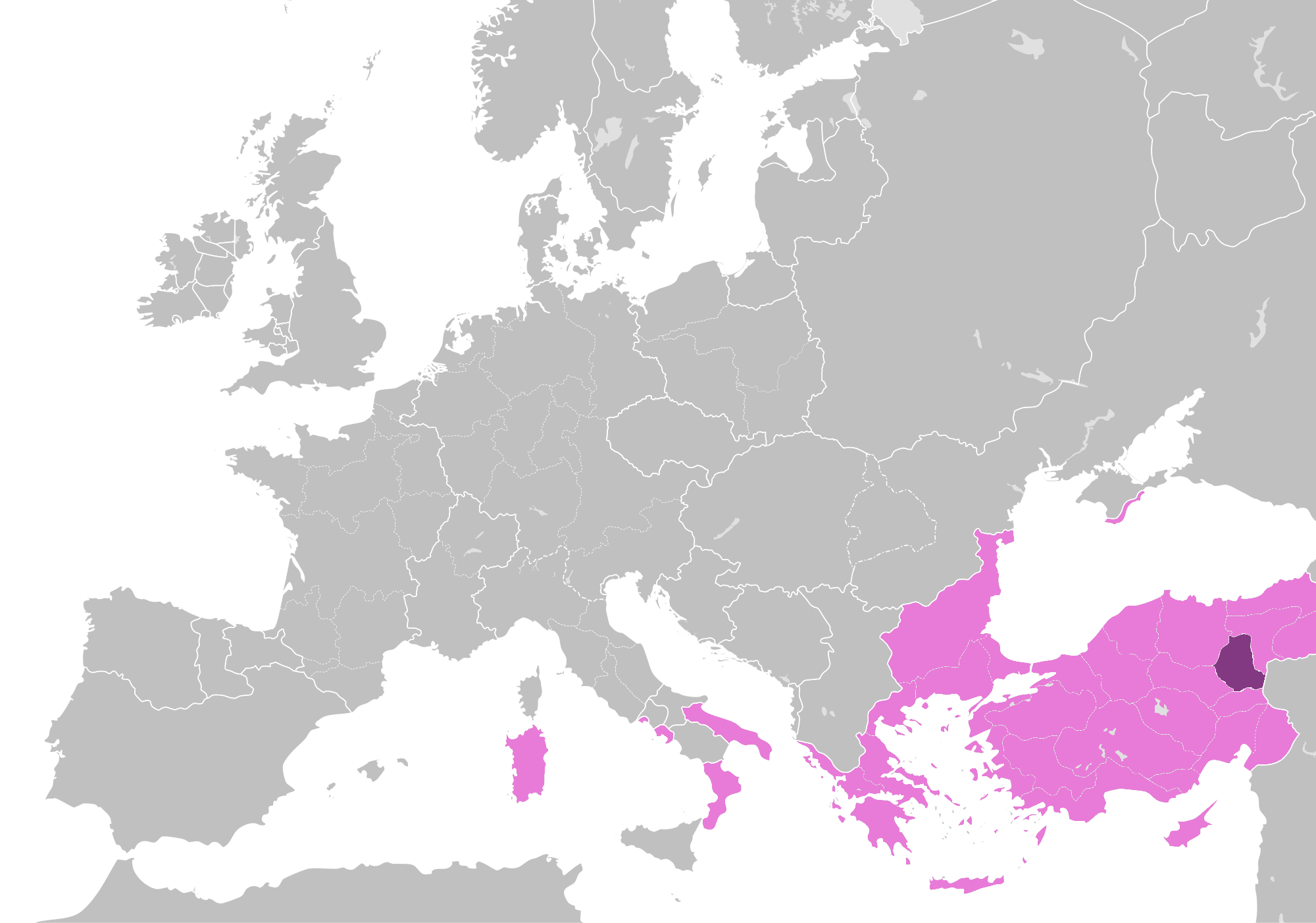
- Map of the Theme of Sebasteia within the Byzantine Empire in 1000 AD.
- Capital: Sebasteia
- Historical era: Middle Ages
  - Established: 911
  - de facto autonomy: ca. 1074
  - Fall to the Seljuks.: ca. 1090
- Today part of: Turkey

The Theme of Sebasteia (Greek: θέμα Σεβαστείας) was a military-civilian province (thema or theme) of the Byzantine Empire located in northeastern Cappadocia and Armenia Minor, in modern Turkey. It was established as a theme in 911 and endured until its fall to the Seljuk Turks in the aftermath of the Battle of Manzikert in 1071.

== History ==
The theme was formed around the city of Sebasteia (modern Sivas). The region formed part of the Armeniac Theme from the mid-7th century. The theme is not mentioned in any source prior to the 10th century. In 908, Sebasteia appears for the first time as a distinct fortified frontier district (kleisoura), and by 911 it had been raised to the status of a full theme. As a kleisoura, it was probably subordinate of the newly established theme of Charsianon.

The theme comprised the entirety of the Byzantine frontier regions along the middle course of the northern Euphrates. With the expansion of the Byzantine frontier, it was extended south and east as far as Melitene, Samosata and Tephrike, corresponding roughly to the ancient Roman provinces of Armenia Prima and parts of Armenia Secunda and Syria Euphratensis. After the mid-10th century, however, its extent was much reduced by the creation of new smaller themes. According to Constantine VII Porphyrogennetos, the theme comprised two districts (tourmai): Larissa (south of modern Mancınık) and Amara or Abara (modern Amran near Arguvan or Emirköy). Both districts were briefly raised to kleisourai—Larissa in c. 908–911 and Amara/Abara under Romanos I Lekapenos—and became the seat of independent strategoi by 975, leading to the theme's progressive diminution and decline in significance.

In the 10th century, the region experienced a great influx of Armenians, who became the dominant population. After 1019/1021, Sebasteia and adjoining lands were given as a fief to the Armenian Seneqerim Ardzruni, in exchange for the cession to the Empire of his kingdom of Vaspurakan. From c. 1074, following the Byzantine defeat against the Seljuk Turks at Manzikert in 1071, the Ardzruni ruled the territory as independent lords, until it was conquered by the Turks around 1090.

== Sources ==
- Kazhdan, Alexander, ed. (1991). The Oxford Dictionary of Byzantium. Oxford and New York: Oxford University Press. ISBN 0-19-504652-8.
- Leveniotis, Georgios Athanasios (2007). Η πολιτική κατάρρευση του Βυζαντίου στην Ανατολή: το ανατολικό σύνορο και η κεντρική Μικρά Ασία κατά το β' ήμισυ του 11ου αι [The Political Collapse of Byzantium in the East: The Eastern Frontier and Central Asia Minor During the Second Half of the 11th Century] (PhD thesis) (in Greek). Aristotle University of Thessaloniki. doi:10.12681/eadd/19246. hdl:10442/hedi/19246.
- McGeer, Eric; Nesbitt, John; Oikonomides, Nicolas, eds. (2001). Catalogue of Byzantine Seals at Dumbarton Oaks and in the Fogg Museum of Art, Volume 4: The East. Washington, DC: Dumbarton Oaks Research Library and Collection. ISBN 0-88402-282-X.
- Pertusi, A. (1952). Constantino Porfirogenito: De Thematibus (in Italian). Rome: Biblioteca Apostolica Vaticana.
