= Theme (Byzantine district) =

Military and administrative division of the Byzantine Empire

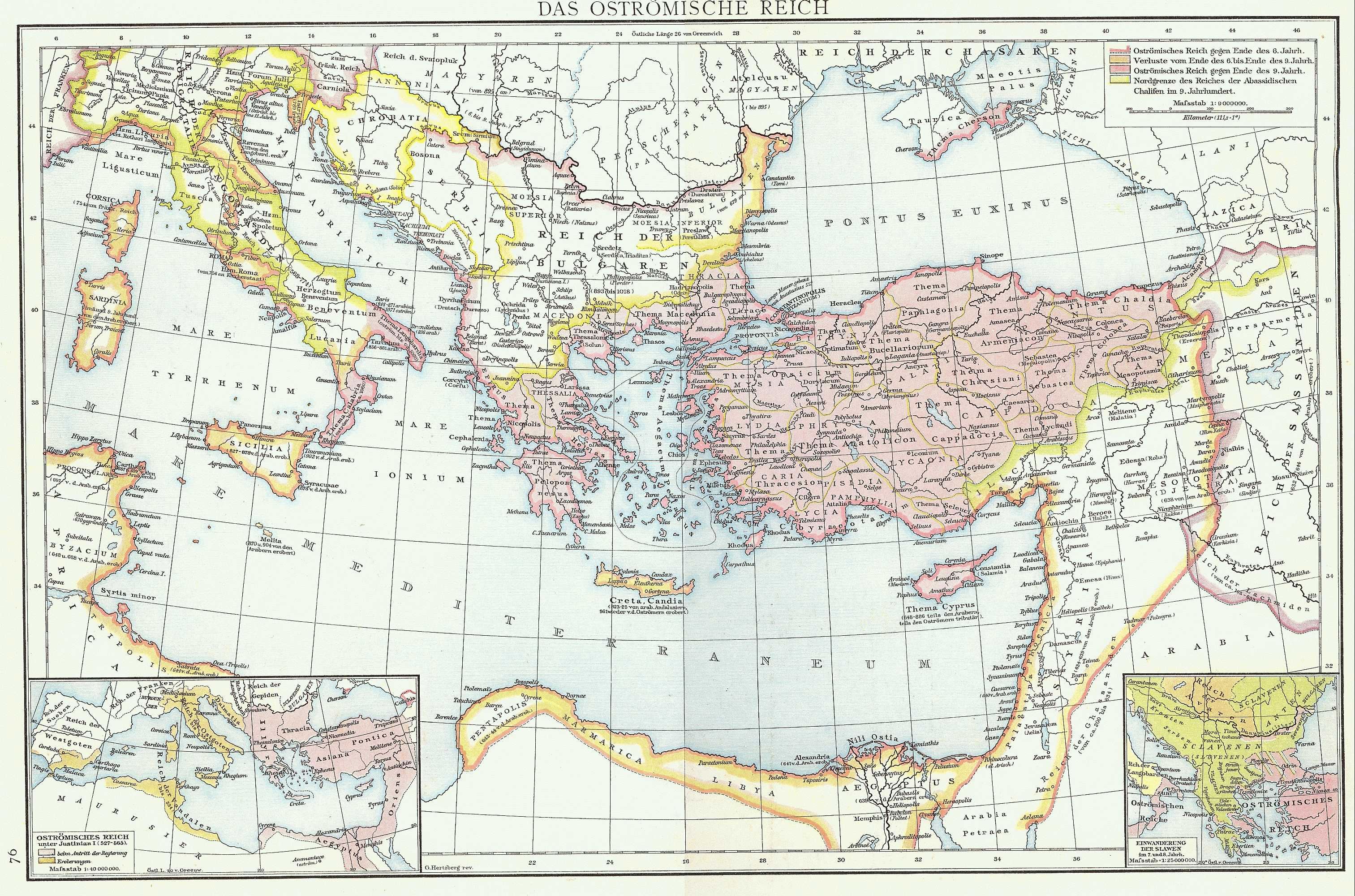
Map showing the extent of the Byzantine Empire in c. 600 and c. 900, including the themes for the latter date

The themes or thémata (Greek: θέματα, thémata, singular: θέμα, théma) were the main military and administrative divisions of the Byzantine Empire. They were established in the mid-7th century in the aftermath of the Slavic migrations to the Balkans and Muslim conquests of parts of Eastern Roman territory, and replaced the earlier ancient provincial system established by Diocletian and Constantine the Great. In their origin, the first themes were created from the areas of encampment of the field armies of the East Roman army, and their names corresponded to the military units that had existed in those areas. The theme system reached its apogee in the 9th and 10th centuries, as older themes were split up and the conquest of territory resulted in the creation of new ones. The original theme system underwent significant changes in the 11th and 12th centuries, but the term remained in use as a provincial and financial circumscription until the very end of the Empire.

== History ==
=== Background ===
During the late 6th and early 7th centuries, the Byzantine Empire was under frequent attack from all sides. The Sassanid Empire was pressing from the east on Syria, Egypt, and Anatolia. Slavs and Avars raided Thrace, Macedonia, Illyricum, and southern Greece and settled in the Balkans. The Lombards occupied northern Italy, largely unopposed. In order to face the mounting pressure, in the more distant provinces of the West, recently regained by Justinian I (r. 527–565), Emperor Maurice (r. 582–602) combined supreme civil and military authority in the person of an exarch, a viceroy, forming the exarchates of Ravenna and Africa. These developments overturned the strict division of civil and military offices, which had been one of the cornerstones of the reforms of Diocletian (r. 284–305). Said administrative restructurings also found a precedent in Justinian's broad reorganization in the western conquests, denoting combined powers to the newly established Praetorian prefects of Africa (Eparchos tes Afrikís) and Italy (Eparchos tes Italías) respectively.

Justinian also endowed governors (eparchs, stratelates) of the eastern provinces plagued by brigandage and foreign invasions with military and administrative powers, formally abolishing the empire's dioceses, Diocletian's main administrative structure, but more importantly, he had also created the exceptional combined military-civilian circumscription of the quaestura exercitus and following the norm, abolished the Diocese of Egypt putting a dux (Greek: stratelates) with combined authority at the head of each of its old provinces instead. The empire maintained this precedent structure until the 640s, when the eastern part of the Empire faced the onslaught of the Caliphate. The rapid Arab conquest of Syria and Egypt and consequent Byzantine losses in manpower and territory meant that the Empire found itself struggling for survival.

In order to respond to this unprecedented crisis, the Empire was drastically reorganized. As established by Hellenistic political practice, philosophies and Orthodox doctrines, power had been concentrated in military leaders strategoi who acted as viceroys in their respective "théma", being appointed by the emperor alone. Their main function around each was the collection of taxes from the different communities "chora", "komai" and from the different states "proasteion" as well as the management of fast and flexible provincial armies. The remaining imperial territory in Asia Minor was divided into four large themes, and although some elements of the earlier civil administration survived, they were subordinated to the governing general or stratēgos.

=== Origins ===
The origin and early nature of the themes has been heavily disputed amongst scholars. The very name théma is of uncertain etymology, but most scholars follow Constantine Porphyrogennetos, who records that it originates from Greek thesis ("placement"). The date of their creation is also uncertain. For most of the 20th century, the establishment of the themes was attributed to the Emperor Heraclius (r. 610–641), during the last of the Byzantine–Sassanid Wars. Most notable amongst the supporters of this thesis was George Ostrogorsky who based this opinion on an extract from the chronicle of Theophanes the Confessor mentioning the arrival of Heraclius "in the lands of the themes" for the year 622. According to Ostrogorsky, this "shows that the process of establishing troops (themes) in specific areas of Asia Minor has already begun at this time." This view has been objected to by other historians however, and more recent scholarship dates their creation later, to the period from the 640s to the 660s, under Constans II (r. 641–668). It has further been shown that, contrary to Ostrogorsky's conception of the thémata being established from the outset as distinct, well-defined regions where a stratēgos held joint military and civil authority, the term théma originally seems to have referred exclusively to the armies themselves, and only in the later 7th or early 8th centuries did it come to be transferred to the districts where these armies were encamped as well.

Tied to the question of chronology is also the issue of a corresponding social and military transformation. The traditional view, championed by Ostrogorsky, holds that the establishment of the themes also meant the creation of a new type of army. In his view, instead of the old force, heavily reliant on foreign mercenaries, the new Byzantine army was based on native farmer-soldiers living on state-leased military estates (compare the organization of the Sasanian aswārān). More recent scholars however have posited that the formation of the themes did not constitute a radical break with the past, but rather a logical extension of pre-existing, 6th-century trends, and that its direct social impact was minimal.

=== First themes: 640s–770s ===
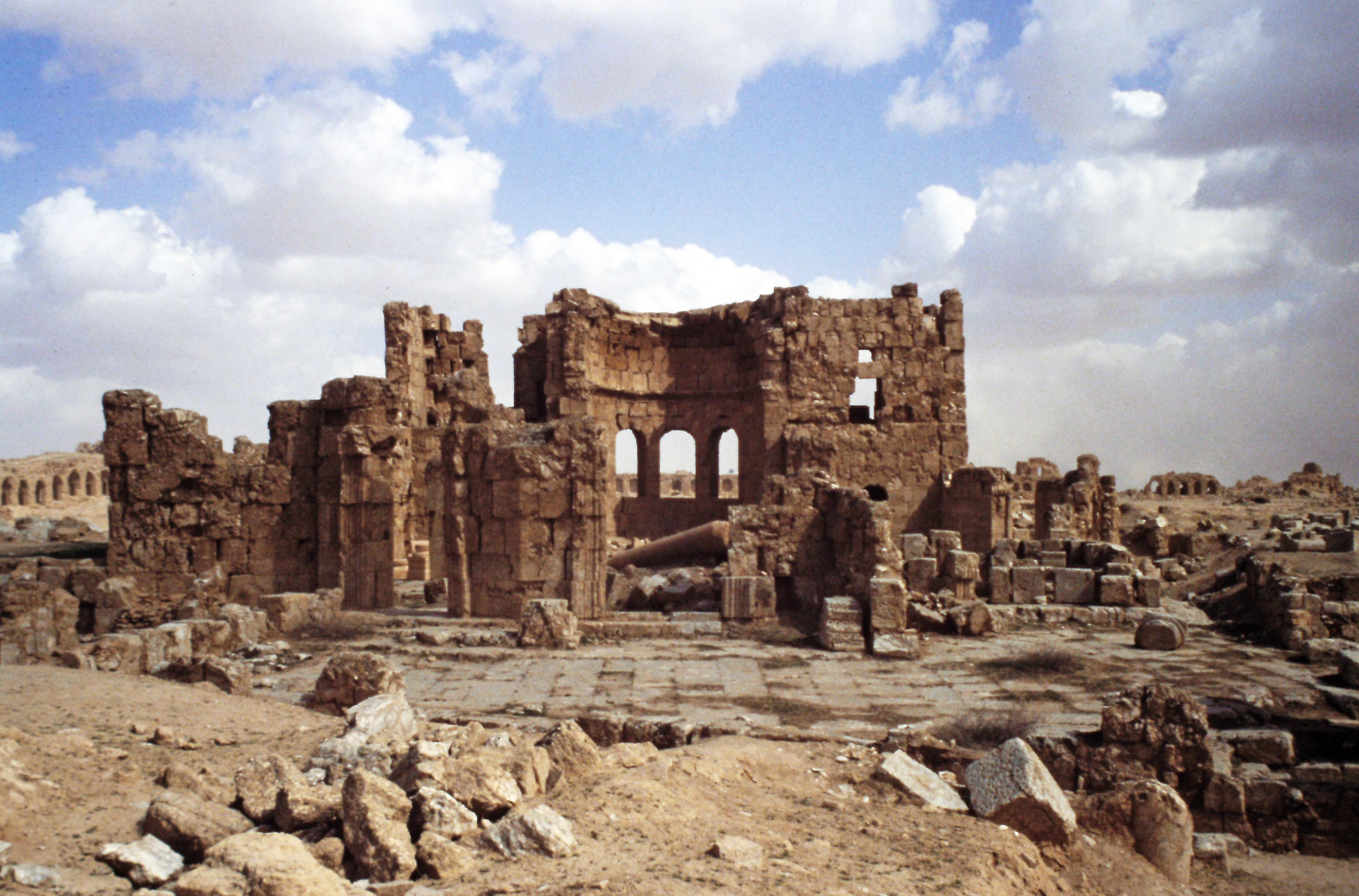
Ruins at Sergiopolis

The Byzantine themata in Asia Minor as they existed in c. 740

Byzantine themata in Anatolia, c. 750

The Byzantine themata in Asia Minor as they existed in c. 780, following the creation of the Bucellarian and Optimatoi themes out of the original theme of the Opsikion

What is clear is that at some point in the mid-7th century, probably in the late 630s and 640s, the Empire's field armies were withdrawn to Anatolia, the last major contiguous territory remaining to the Empire, and assigned to the districts that became known as the themes. Territorially, each of the new themes encompassed several of the older provinces, and with a few exceptions, seems to have followed the old provincial boundaries. The first four themes were those of the Armeniacs, Anatolics and Thracesians, and the Opsician theme. The Armeniac Theme (Θέμα Ἀρμενιακῶν, Théma Armeniakōn), first mentioned in 667, was the successor of the Army of Armenia. It occupied the old areas of the Pontus, Armenia Minor and northern Cappadocia, with its capital at Amasea. The Anatolic Theme (Θέμα Ἀνατολικῶν, Anatolikōn), first mentioned in 669, was the successor of the Army of the East (Aνατολῆ, Anatolē). It covered southern central Asia Minor, and its capital was Amorium. Together, these two themes formed the first tier of defence of Byzantine Anatolia, bordering Muslim Armenia and Syria respectively. The Thracesian Theme (Θέμα Θρᾳκησίων, Théma Thrakēsiōn), first mentioned clearly as late as c. 740, was the successor of the Army of Thrace, and covered the central western coast of Asia Minor (Ionia, Lydia and Caria), with its capital most likely at Chonae. The Opsician Theme (Θέμα Ὀψικίου, Théma Opsikiou), first mentioned in 680, was constituted from the imperial retinue (in Latin Obsequium). It covered northwestern Asia Minor (Bithynia, Paphlagonia and parts of Galatia), and was based at Nicaea. Uniquely, its commander retained his title of kómēs (κόμης, "count").

In addition, the great naval division of the Carabisians or Karabisianoi (Kαραβισιάνοι, "people of the κᾱ́ρᾰβοι [ships]"), first mentioned in 680, was probably formed of the remains of the Army of the Illyricum or, more likely, the old quaestura exercitus. It never formed a theme proper, but occupied parts of the southern coast of Asia Minor and the Aegean Islands, with its stratēgos seat most likely at Samos. It provided the bulk of the Byzantine navy facing the new Arab fleets, which after the Battle of the Masts contested control of the Mediterranean with the Empire. In the event, the Carabisians would prove unsatisfactory in that role, and by 720 they had been disbanded in favour of a fully fledged naval theme, that of the Cibyrrhaeots (Θέμα Κιβυρραιωτῶν, Thema Kibyrrhaiotōn), which encompassed the southern coasts of Asia Minor and the Aegean islands.

The part of the region of Thrace under Byzantine control was probably constituted as a theme at about 680, as a response to the Bulgar threat, although for a time the command over Thrace appears to have been exercised by the Count of the Opsikion. Successive campaigns by the emperors of the Heraclian dynasty in Greece also led to the recovery of control of Central Greece from Slavic invaders, and to the establishment of the theme of Hellas there between 687 and 695. Sicily too was formed as a theme by the end of the 7th century, but the imperial possessions in mainland Italy remained under the exarch of Ravenna or the local doukes, as did Byzantine Africa until the fall of Carthage in 698. At the same time, Crete and the imperial exclave of Cherson in the Crimea formed independent archontiai.

Thus, by the turning of the century, the themes had become the dominant feature of imperial administration. Their large size and power however made their generals prone to revolt, as had been evidenced in the turbulent period 695–715, and would again during the great revolt of Artabasdos in 741–742. The suppression of Artabasdos' revolt heralded the first significant changes in the Anatolian themes: the over-mighty Opsikion was broken up with the creation of two new themes, the Bucellarian Theme and the Optimates, while the role of imperial guard was assumed by a new type of professional force, the imperial tagmata.

=== Height of the theme system, 780s–950s ===
Byzantine themata in Anatolia, c. 950

The Byzantine themata in Asia Minor as they existed in c. 842, following the reorganization of the original themes

The Byzantine themata in Europe as they existed in c. 900

Despite the prominence of the themes, it was some time before they became the basic unit of the imperial administrative system. Although they had become associated with specific regions by the early 8th century, it took until the end of the 8th century for the civil fiscal administration to begin being organized around them, instead of following the old provincial system. This process, resulting in unified control over both military and civil affairs of each theme by its strategos, was complete by the mid-9th century, and is the "classical" thematic model mentioned in such works as the Klētorologion and the De Administrando Imperio.

At the same time, the need to protect the Anatolian heartland of Byzantium from the Arab raids led to the creation, in the later 8th and early 9th centuries, of a series of small frontier districts, the kleisourai or kleisourarchiai ("defiles, enclosures"). The term was previously used to signify strategically important, fortified mountain passages, and was now expanded to entire districts which formed separate commands under a kleisourarchēs, tasked with guerrilla warfare and locally countering small to mid-scale incursions and raids. Gradually, most of these were elevated to full themes.

=== Decline of the system, 960s–1070s ===
With the beginning of the Byzantine offensives in the East and the Balkans in the 10th century, especially under the warrior-emperors Nikephoros II (r. 963–969), John I Tzimiskes (r. 969–976) and Basil II (r. 976–1025), newly gained territories were also incorporated into themes, although these were generally smaller than the original themes established in the 7th and 8th centuries.

The themata of the Byzantine Empire, at the death of Basil II in 1025

At this time, a new class of themes, the so-called "minor" (μικρὰ θέματα) or "Armenian" themes (ἀρμενικὰ θέματα) appear, which Byzantine sources clearly differentiate from the traditional "great" or "Roman" themes (ῥωμαϊκά θέματα). Most consisted merely of a fortress and its surrounding territory, with a junior stratēgos (called zirwar by the Arabs and zoravar by the Armenians) as a commander and about 1,000 men, chiefly infantry, as their garrison. As their name reveals, they were mostly populated by Armenians, either indigenous or settled there by the Byzantine authorities. One of their peculiarities was the extremely large number of officers (the theme of Charpezikion alone counted 22 senior and 47 junior tourmarchai).

While well suited for defence, the "Armenian" themes were incapable of responding to major invasions or undertake sustained offensive campaigns on their own. Thus, from the 960s, more and more professional regiments, both from the old tagmata and newly raised formations, were stationed along the border. To command them as well as coordinate the forces of the small frontier themes, a number of large regional commands ("ducates" or "catepanates"), under a doux or katepano, were set up. In the East, the three original such commands, set up by John Tzimiskes, were those of the doukes of Antioch, Chaldia and Mesopotamia. As Byzantium expanded into Greater Armenia in the early 11th century, these were complemented or replaced by the commands of Iberia, Vaspurakan, Edessa and Ani. In the same vein, the "Armenian" themes seem to have been placed under a single strategos in the mid-11th century.

The series of soldier-emperors culminating in Basil II led to a situation where by 1025 Byzantium was more powerful than any of its enemies. At the same time, the mobile, professional forces of the tagmata gained in importance over the old thematic armies (and fleets) of the interior, which soon began to be neglected. Indeed, from the early 11th century military service was increasingly commuted to cash payments. While the frontier ducates were able to meet most local threats, the dissolution of the old theme-based defensive system deprived the Byzantine defensive system of any strategic depth. Coupled with increasing reliance on foreign mercenaries and the forces of allied and vassal states, as well as the revolts and civil wars resulting from the widening rift between the civilian bureaucracy in Constantinople and the land-holding military elites (the dynatoi), by the time of the Battle of Manzikert in 1071, the Byzantine army was already undergoing a severe crisis and collapsed completely in the battle's aftermath.

=== Change and decline: 11th–12th centuries ===
Map of themes within the Byzantine Empire in 1045

The Komnenian era saw a brief restoration of the empire's fortunes as the force now known as the 'Komnenian army' was established by Alexios I Komnenos, marking a decisive break with the thematic system. The new army was highly centralized in the person of the emperor and the ruling dynasty, and provided an element of stability which characterized the Komnenian restoration. It was noticeably more reliant on mercenaries such as the Varangian guard than the previous army, reducing the importance of the themes. The strategoi increasingly lost power as the empire centralized. The emperors often appointed relatives to the governorships, reducing their autonomous character and solidifying centralized imperial administration.

The Komnenian restoration required a new system to manage the severely weakened themes of Anatolia due to the catastrophe of Manzikert. The themes followed the Kommenian era trend of greater imperial centralization with the governors being members of the imperial family, owing their allegiance solely to the emperor. This eroded the old independent character of the once large Anatolian themes. The new military governors (called Doux or Katepanos indiscriminately) assumed strongly centralized roles on the emperor's behalf so that the influx of landed pronoia foreigners in military service could be regulated and counteracted in cases of uprising. The governorships were specifically reserved for relatives of the Komnenian family alone and though efficient emergency measures, it successfully turned the empire into a dependency on foreign mercenaries, yielding the mass of native Greeks and making it unprecedentedly subordinate to the will of its European counterparts.

Each Theme was overseen by a Katepanos or Doux, whose authorities was both military and civil, subdivided into Katepanakias encompassing the old Tourmas, now each ruled by a Praktor instead of a Tourmarches fulfilling the same civic and military roles now widely in the hands of pronoiars. The pronoiars became the bulk of the imperial tagmata's reserves, slowly taking their place side by side with the totally lawless landed monasteries and the dynatoi, who after Alexios's tax reforms could formalize the various illegally acquired towns and communes as long as they could secure the full taxation of their new domains by the fisc, a process worse fueled by the extensive chrysobulas of different institutions granted by the monarch.

The Byzantine army of the Komnenian era never managed to field the manpower of the themes in their heyday, and the new system proved more expensive to maintain in the long run. It also relied on a succession of strong soldier-emperors to be effective. With the death of Manuel I Komnenos in 1180, a new period of decline set in.

=== Late Byzantine themata ===
The neglect under the Angeloi dynasty and the weakening of central authority made the themes increasingly irrelevant in the late 12th century. Regional civil authorities such as the 'despotates' grew in power as central authority collapsed, rendering the themes moribund by the onset of the Palaiologos dynasty's rule.

The now irrelevant micro provinces under imperial control were organized directly into katepanakias or kephalatikion each also ruled by a Katepan or Kephale with military and civic powers centered around forts and major passes, relegating all minor tasks to deputies.

== Organization ==
The term thema was ambiguous, referring both to a form of military tenure and to an administrative division. A theme was an arrangement of plots of land given for farming to the soldiers "stratiotai" coexisting with different villages and towns, "Komai", "Chora" which were taxed for rapid and continuous revenue for the state with an easy and simple handling for a more direct control of the empire by the emperor alone or his viceroys, which ultimately, was a simplified Hellenistic and fiscal administrative principle adapted for war times. The soldiers were still technically a military unit, under the command of a strategos, they did not own the land they worked as it was still controlled by the state. Therefore, for its use the soldiers' pay was reduced. By accepting this proposition, the participants agreed that their descendants would also serve in the military and work in a theme, thus simultaneously reducing the need for unpopular conscription as well as cheaply maintaining the military. It also allowed for the settling of conquered lands, as there was always a substantial addition made to public lands "proasteion" during a conquest.

The commander of a theme, however, did not only command his soldiers. He united the civil and military jurisdictions in the territorial area in question. Thus the division set up by Diocletian between civil governors (praesides etc.) and military commanders (duces etc.) was abolished, and the Empire returned to a system much more similar to that of the Republic or the Principate and directly linkeable to the system of Eparchies and Strategiai set up in the Hellenistic Seleucid and Mithridatric Kingdoms respectively, which were military in origin and organization as well, where provincial governors had also commanded the armies in their area.

The following table illustrates the thematic structure as found in the Thracesian Theme, c. 902–936:

Structure of the Thema Thrakēsiōn
Name	Number of personnel	Number of subordinate units	Officer in command
Thema	9,600	4 Tourmai	Strategos
Tourma	2,400	6 Droungoi	Tourmarches
Droungos	400	2 Banda	Droungarios
Bandon	200	2 Kentarchiai	Komes
Kentarchia	100	10 Kontoubernia	Kentarches/Hekatontarches
	50	5 Kontoubernia	Pentekontarches
Kontoubernion	10	1 "Vanguard" + 1 "Rear Guard"	Dekarchos
"Vanguard"	5	n/a	Pentarches
"Rear Guard"	4	n/a	Tetrarches

== List of the themes between c. 660 and 930 ==
This list includes the large "traditional" themes established in the period from the inception of the theme system in c. 660 to the beginning of the great conquests in c. 930 and the creation of the new, smaller themes.

Theme (name in Greek)	Date	Established from	Later divisions	Capital	Original territory	Other cities
Aegean Sea^{†} (thema Aigaiou Pelàgous, Θέμα τοῦ Αἰγαίου Πελάγους)	by 842/843	Cibyrrhaeots, raised from independent droungariate		possibly Mytilene or Methymna	Lesbos, Lemnos, Chios, Imbros, Tenedos, Hellespont, Sporades and Cyclades	Methymna, Mytilene, Chios, Alexandria Troas, Abydos, Lampsakos, Cyzicus, Sestos, Callipolis
Anatolics (thema Anatolikōn, Θέμα των Ἀνατολικῶν)	by 669/670	Former Field Army of the East/Syria	Cappadocia^{§} (830)	Amorium	Phrygia, Pisidia, Isauria	Iconium, Polybotos, Philomelion, Akroinon, Synnada, Sozopolis, Thebasa, Antiochia, Derbe, Laranda, Isaura, Pessinus
Armeniacs (thema Armeniakōn, Armeniakoi, Θέμα τῶν Ἀρμενιακῶν)	by 667/668	Former Field Army of Armenia	Chaldia (by 842), Charsianon^{§} (863), Koloneia (863), Paphlagonia (by 826)	Amasea	Pontus, Armenia Minor, northern Cappadocia	Sinope, Amisus, Euchaita, Comana Pontica
Bucellarians (thema Boukellarion, Boukellàrioi, Θέμα τῶν Βουκελλαρίων)	by 767/768	Opsikion	Paphlagonia (in part), Cappadocia (in part), Charsianon (in part)	Ancyra	Galatia, Paphlagonia	Tios, Heraclea Pontica, Claudiopolis, Cratea, Iuliopolis, Lagania, Gordion
Cappadocia^{§} (thema Kappadokias, Θέμα Καππαδοκίας)	by 830	Armeniacs, part of the Bucellarians		Koron Fortress, later Tyana	SW Cappadocia	Podandus, Nyssa, Loulon Fortress, Tyana, Nazianzus, Heraclea Cybistra
Cephallenia^{†} (thema Kephallēnias, Θέμα Κεφαλληνίας)	by 809		Langobardia (by 910), ?Nicopolis (by 899)	Cephallenia	Ionian Islands, Apulia	Corfu, Zakynthos, Leucate
Chaldia (thema Chaldias, Θέμα Χαλδίας)	c. 840	Armeniacs (originally a tourma)	Duchy of Chaldia	Trebizond	Pontic coast	Rhizus, Cerasous, Polemonion, Paiperta
Charsianon^{§} (thema Charsianoù, Θέμα Χαρσιανοῦ)	863–873	Armeniacs (originally a tourma), part of the Bucellarians		Caesarea	NW Cappadocia	Charsianon
Cherson/Klimata (thema Chersōnos/Klimata, Θέμα Χερσῶνος/τὰ Κλίματα)	833	ruled by the Khazars in the 8th century, Byz. rule rest. by Theophilos		Cherson	South Crimea	Sougdea, Theodosia, Bosporos, Galita
Cibyrrhaeots^{†} (thema Kibyrrhaiotōn, Kibyrrhaiotai, Θέμα τῶν Κυβυρραιωτῶν)	by 697/698 or c. 720	Created from the Karabisianoi fleet	Aegean Sea, Samos, Seleucia	Samos, later Attaleia	Pamphylia, Lycia, Dodecanese, Aegean Islands, Ionian coast	Rhodes, Myra, Cibyrrha, Limyra, Phaselis, Side, Selinus, Anemurium, Sagalassus, Telmissus, Patara, Halicarnassus, Iassus, Mylasa, Selge, Cnidus, Kos
Crete^{†} (thema Krētēs, Θέμα Κρήτης)	by 767 (?), again in 961	Arab emirate from c. 828 until Byz. reconquest in 961		Chandax	Crete	Rethymnon, Gortys
Dalmatia (thema Dalmatias, Θέμα Δαλματίας)	by 899	New territory		Idassa/Iadera	Coast of Dalmatia	Ragousa, Aspalathos, Polae, Tragyrion, Scardona
Dyrrhachium (thema Dyrrhachiou, Θέμα Δυρραχίου)	by 842	New territory		Dyrrhachium	Illyria, Albanian coast	Aulon, Apollonia, Lissos
Hellas (thema Hellàdos, Helladikoi, Θέμα τῆς Ἑλλάδος/Ἑλλαδικῶν)	c. 690	Karabisianoi	Cephallenia (by 809), Peloponnese (by 811)	Corinth, later Thebes (after 809)	Initially E. Peloponnese and Attica, after 809 eastern Central Greece and Thessaly	(after 809) Athens, Larissa, Pharsala, Lamia, Thermopylae, Plataeae, Euripus, Demetrias, Stagoi
Koloneia^{§} (thema Kolōneias, Θέμα Κολωνείας)	by 863, probably c. 842	Armeniacs, kleisoura by early 9th century	Duchy of Chaldia	Koloneia	North Armenia Minor	Satala, Nicopolis, Neocaesarea
Longobardia (thema Longobardias, Θέμα Λογγοβαρδίας)	by 892	Cephallenia (originally a tourma)		Barion	Apulia, Lucania	Tarantas, Brindesion, Hydrus, Callipolis
Lykandos (thema Lykàndou, Θέμα Λυκάνδου)	by 916	New territory		Lykandos Fortress	SE Cappadocia	Arabissos, Cocyssos, Comana
Macedonia (thema Makedonias, Θέμα Μακεδονίας)	by 802	Thrace	Strymon	Adrianopolis	Western Thrace	Didymoteicho, Mosynopolis, Aenos, Maronia
Mesopotamia (thema Mesopotamias, Θέμα Μεσοποταμίας)	by 899-911	New territory	Duchy of Mesopotamia	Kamacha	Upper Euphratesia	
Nicopolis (thema Nikopoleōs, Θέμα Νικοπόλεως)	by 899	probably raised from tourma of the Peloponnese		Naupaktos	Epirus, Aetolia, Acarnania	Ioannina, Buthrotum, Rogoi, Dryinoupolis, Nicopolis, Himarra
Opsikion (Thema of Opsikion, Θέμα τοῦ Ὀψικίου)	by 680	Imperial Praesental Armies	Bucellarians (by 768), Optimates (by 775)	Nicaea	Mysia, Northern Phrygia, Western Bithynia	Prussa, Kios, Malagina, Dorylaion, Nakoleia, Krasos, Kotyaion, Midaeum
Optimates (thema Optimàtōn, Optimatoi, Θέμα τῶν Ὀπτιμάτων)	by 775	Opsicians		Nicomedia	Bithynia opposite Constantinople	Chalcedon, Chrysopolis
Paphlagonia (thema Paphlagonias, Θέμα Παφλαγονίας)	by 826, prob. c. 820	Armeniacs, Bucellarians (in part)		Gangra	Paphlagonia	Amastris, Ionopolis, Kastamonè, Pompeiopolis
Peloponnese (thema Peloponnēsou, Θέμα Πελοποννήσου)	by 811	Hellas in part, in part new territory	?Nicopolis (by 899)	Corinth	Peloponnese	Patrae, Argos, Lacedaemon, Korinthos, Helos, Methòne, Elis, Monemvasia
Phasiane (Derzene) (thema Phasianēs/Derzēnēs, Θέμα Φασιανῆς/Δερζηνῆς)	by 935	New territory and Theme of Mesopotamia	Duchy of Mesopotamia	Arsamosata	source of Aras	
Samos^{†} (thema Samou, Θέμα Σάμου)	by 899	Cibyrrhaeots, raised from independent drungariate of the Gulf		Smyrna	Southeastern Aegean islands, Ionian coast (shared with Thracesians)	Samos, Ephesos, Miletus, Magnesia, Tralles, Lebedos, Teos, Clazomenae, Phocaea, Pergamon, Adramyttion
Sebasteia^{§} (thema Sebasteias, Θέμα Σεβαστείας)	by 911	Armeniacs, kleisoura by c. 900		Sebasteia	NE Cappadocia and Armenia Minor	Dazimon
Seleucia^{§} (thema Seleukeias, Θέμα Σελευκείας)	by 934	Cibyrrhaeots, from early 9th century a kleisoura		Seleucia	Western Cilicia	Claudiopolis
Sicily (thema Sikelias, Θέμα Σικελίας)	by 700		Calabria (remaining territory after Muslim conquest of Sicily)	Syracuse	Sicily and Calabria	Katàne, Tavromènion, Panormos, Akragas, Leontini, Himera, Mazzara, Lilybaeum, Drepanum
Strymon^{§} (thema Strymōnos, Θέμα Στρυμῶνος)	by 899, probably 840s	Macedonia, raised from kleisoura (709)		Neapolis	roughly modern Greek Eastern Macedonia	Serres
Thessalonica (thema Thessalonikēs, Θέμα Θεσσαλονίκης)	by 824			Thessalonica	roughly modern Greek Central Macedonia	Beroia, Edessa, Dion, Ierissos, Moglena, Diocletianopolis, Servia
Thrace (thema Thrakēs, Θέμα Θράκης/Θρᾳκῷον)	by 680	?Opsicians	Macedonia	Arcadiopolis	Eastern Thrace, except Constantinople	Selymbria, Bizye, Perinthus, Rhaedestus
Thracesians (thema Thrakēsiōn, Thrakēsioi, Θέμα Θρᾳκησίων)	by 687	Former Field Army of Thrace		Chonae	Lydia, Ionia	Hierapolis, Sardeis, Thyatira, Laodikea

Notes:
^{†} naval theme (in Greek thema nautikon, θέμα ναυτικόν)
^{§} Originally established as a kleisoura

== List of new themes, 930s–1080s ==
These were the new major or minor themes (provinces), established during the Byzantine conquests, in the East (the so-called "Armenian" themes or generalships, strategiai), in Italy and in the Balkans. The minor themes fell under the juridisciation of a doux or katepano.

Theme (name in Greek)	Date	Capital	Jurisdiction	Comments
Abara/Amara (Ἀβάρα)	c. 970s	Abara	Mesopotamia	Kleisoura of Sebasteia under Romanos I Lekapenos before 920, attested to as a theme in the Escorial Taktikon in the 970s.
Adata (Ἃδατα)	c. 970s	Adata	Antioch	Attested to in the Escorial Taktikon.
Anabarza (Ἀνάζαρβα)	c. 964	Anabarza	Antioch	Conquered by Alp Arslan.
Anchialos (Αγχίαλος)	1086	Anchialos		
Ani (Ἀνί)	1045	Ani	Ani	
Antarados (Ἀντάραδος)	c. 990	Antarados	Antioch	Established after the conquests of John I Tzimiskes.
Antioch (Ἀντιόχεια)	969	Antioch		Temporarily a joint-command with Lykandos before being raised to a doukate in 970.
Archesh	1023/1024	Archesh		
Artach (Ἀρτὰχ)	c. 966	Artach	Antioch	
Artze (Ἄρτζε)	970s	Artze	Iberia(?)	A minor theme attested in the Escorial Taktikon. Ceded to David III of Tao in 979, recovered after David's death in 1000 and subordinated to the catepanate of Iberia. The town was destroyed by the Turks in 1049.
Artzike	c. 1050?	Artzike		
Asmosaton (Ἀσμόσατον)	c. 938	Asmosaton		A minor theme, it survived until conquered by the Turks in the 1050s.
Balaneos (Στρατηγάτον Βαλανέως)	c. 975	Balaneos	Antioch	
Boleron/Neos Strymon (thema Voleroù/Nèou Strymōnos, Θέμα Βολεροῦ/Νέου Στρυμῶνος)	970s	Serres		
Borze/Barzuya (Βορζὲ)	10th/11th century	Borze	Antioch	
Bulgaria (thema Boulgarias, Θέμα Βουλγαρίας)	1018	Scupi		established by Emperor Basil II after the victory over Samuel of Bulgaria and the fall of the First Bulgarian Empire in 1018. It was based on the wider regions of Skopje and Ohrid (modern North Macedonia and south Serbia).
Calabria (thema Kalavrias, Θέμα Καλαβρίας)	c. 950	Rhegion	Italy	Following the Muslim conquest of Sicily, from 902 the Theme of Sicily was limited to Calabria, but retained its original name until the middle of the 10th century
Chantiarte	before 975	Chantiarte	Mesopotamia	
Charpezikion (Χαρπεζίκιον)	after 949	Charpezikion	Mesopotamia	A minor theme.
Chasanara	before 970	Chasanara	Mesopotamia	
Chavzizin (Χαυζίζιον)	after 940	Chavzizin		A minor theme covering the area of the Bingöl Dağ mountains.
Chorzine	before 975	Chorzine	Mesopotamia	
Chouit	before 975	Chouit		
Chozanon (Χόζανον)	before 956, possibly 948/952	Chozanon	Mesopotamia	An "Armenian theme".
Cyprus (thema Kyprou, Θέμα Κύπρου)	965	Leukosia		Byzantine-Arab condominium from 688 until the definite Byzantine reconquest in 965.
Dekapolis	10th/11th century			
Derzene (Δερζηνῆ)	948/952	Chozanon	Chaldia	A minor theme, the administration of Derzene was often entrusted to officials of the theme of Chaldia.
Dryinopolis (Δρυϊνόπολις)	1018	Dryinopolis		Theme created during the reconquest of Albania from the Bulgarian Empire, together with Dyrrhachium and Koloneia.
Edessa (thema Edēssēs, Θέμα Ἐδέσσης)	1032	Edessa		Captured by George Maniakes in 1032, it became seat of a strategos, later a doux, until conquered by the Turks in 1086.
Erkne	c. 970	Erkne	Mesopotamia	
Euphrates Cities (Παρευφρατίδαι Πόλεις)	c. 1032			Minor theme.
Germanikeia (Γερμανίκεια)	c. 970	Germanikeia	Antioch	
Hagios Elias	before 990?	Hagios Elias	Antioch	
Hexakomia or Hexapolis (Ἑξακωμία/Ἑξάπολις)	970s		Mesopotamia	Minor theme, its name means "six villages/cities", a region between Lykandos and Melitene. It apparently was also an episcopal see.
Hierapolis/Bambyce	11th century	Hierapolis		
Iberia (θέμα Ἰβηρίας)	c. 1001 or c. 1023	Theodosiopolis		Formed out of the territories of David III of Tao, which he bequeathed to Basil II. The date of establishment is disputed among scholars. United with Ani in 1045 and with Kars in 1064.
Irenoupolis	after 965	Irenoupolis		
Kaloudia	by 975	Kaloudia	Mesopotamia	
Kama (Κάμα)	970s		Mesopotamia	Minor theme attested only in the Escorial Tactikon, location uncertain.
Kars	10th/11th century			
Keltzene	10th/11th century?	Keltzene		
Koloneia (Albania) (Θέμα Κολωνείας Ηπείρου)	1018	Koloneia		Theme created during the reconquest of Albania from the Bulgarian Empire, together with Dyrrhachium and Dryinopolis.
Kogovit	c. 1050			
Koptos	by 975		Mesopotamia	
Kymbalaios	by 975	Kymbalaios		
Laodikeia in Syria (Λαοδίκεια τῆς Συρίας)	c. 980	Laodikeia	Antioch	
Larissa	by 975	Larissa	Mesopotamia	
Lucania (thema Leukanias, Θέμα Λευκανίας)	968	Tursi	Italy	
Limnia	by 975		Mesopotamia	
Manzikert (Ματζικέρτ)	1000	Manzikert	Vaspurakan(?)	Part of the territories inherited from David III of Tao, it was the seat of a strategos, later probably a subordinate of the doux of Vaspurakan.
Marakeus/Marakeia (Στρατηγάτον Μαρακέως)	c. 990	Marakeus	Antioch	
Mauron Oros 'The Black Mountain' (Μαῦρον Ὄρος)	968	Mauron Oros	Antioch	
Melitene (Μελιτηνή)	970s	Melitene	Mesopotamia	Became an imperial curatorship (kouratoreia) after conquered by John Kourkouas in 934.
Melte	c. 966	Melte	Vaspurakan(?)	
Mopsouestia (Μοψουεστία)	c. 965	Mopsuestia	Antioch(?)	
Mouzariou	c. 960s	Mouzariou	Mesopotamia	
Ohrid (Θέμα Οχρίδας)	1015	Ohrid		Smaller frontier Theme established during the Conquest of Bulgaria in 1015. Subordinated to the Theme of Bulgaria
Pagrae	c. 965	Pagrae	Antioch	
Palatza (Στρατηγάτον Παλατζά)	after 966	Palatza	Antioch	Conquered in 966, first attested to as a theme in the Alexiad.
Paristrion/Paradounavon (thema Paristriou/Paradoùnavon, Θέμα Παριστρίου/Παραδούναβον)	1020	Dorostrolon		
Perkri	c. 1034	Perkri		
Podandos (Πόδανδος)	c. 960s	Podandos	Antioch	
Romanoupolis (Ῥωμανούπολις)	before 969	Romanoupolis	Mesopotamia	
Samosata (Σαμόσατα)	958	Samosata		Became the seat of a strategos after the Byzantine conquest in 958.
Servia (Σέρβια)	1020	Servia		Minor theme. Established from the territories conquered from the Bulgarian Empire.
Sirmium (thema Sirmiou, Θέμα Σιρμίου)	1018	Sirmium		Established in 1018 at the northwestern part of the Bulgarian Empire (Syrmia)
Soteroupolis-Anakopia (Σωτηρουπολις Ἀνακουπία)	c. 1033	Soteroupolis-Anakopia		
Soteroupolis/Bourzo (Σωτηρουπολις/Βουρζώ)	c. 970	Soteroupolis/Bourzoka	Chaldia	The Esecorial Taktikon uses both names.
Strumica (thema Strṓmnitsas, Θέμα Στρώμνιτσας)	1018	Stromnitsa		Minor Theme. Established from territories conquered from the Bulgarian Empire
Tarantas (Τάραντας)	970s	Tarantas	Mesopotamia	Minor theme attested only in the Escorial Taktikon.
Taron (Ταρών)	966/7	Taron		A dependency of the Empire since the early 10th century, the region of Taron became a theme in 966/7 and remained a Byzantine province until lost to the Turks after Manzikert.
Tarsos (Ταρσός)	after 965	Tarsus	Antioch	
Telouch (Τελοὺχ)	after 962	Telouch	Antioch	Conquered by Nikephoros Phokas in 962, but only attested as a thema in the early 1030s.
Tephrike/Leontokome^{§} (thema Tephrikēs/Leontokōmēs, Θέμα Τεφρικῆς/Λεωντοκώμης)	934/944	Tephrike		Formed as a kleisoura after the Byzantine reconquest of the Paulician principality of Tephrike, renamed Leontokome under Leo VI the Wise, became a theme in the 930s.
Theodosiopolis (Θεοδοσιούπολις)	949, again in 1000	Theodosiopolis	Iberia	Formed as a theme after the Byzantine conquest in 949, ceded to David III of Tao in 979, recovered in 1000, it became the capital of the theme of Iberia.
Tzamandos	957	Lykandos	Mesopotamia	Administered by the neighbouring strategos of Lykandos
Tziliapert	c. 950s?	Tziliapert		Only attested to on seals, chronology uncertain
Vaasprakania (Βαασπρακανία)	1021/2	Van?		Established when Seneqerim-Hovhannes, king of Vaspurakan, ceded his realm to the Empire. Governed by a doux/katepano at Van, it lasted until overrun by the Turks after 1071.
Zagoria (Θέμα Ζαγορίων)	11th century	Meleniko		
Zebel/Gabala (Ζέβελ/ Στρατηγάτον Γαβάλων)	c. 975	Zebel	Antioch	According to Anna Komnene, Gabala is the proper Greek name, whilst Zebel is the "barbarized" form used by the locals.
Zermiou	c. 970	Zermiou	Mesopotamia	
Zoume/Juma (θέμα Ζοῦμε)	c. 965	Zoume	Antioch	

== Later themes, 12th–13th centuries ==
Theme (name in Greek)	Date	Capital	Comments
Achyraous (Άχυράους)	end of 12th century	Achyraous	Attested only in 2 Latin sources: the 1198 chrysobull of Alexios III (Provincia Acherau); and the Treaty of 1204 (Provintia Achirai). Comprised the northern part of the Thracesian Theme.
Maiandros (Θέμα Μαιάνδρου)	after 1204	Antioch on the Maeander	A minor theme of the Nicaean period, which eventually became part of the southern Thracesian theme.
Malagina (Θέμα Μελάγινων)	12th century	Malagina	Separated from the Theme of the Optimatoi
Mylasa and Melanoudion (Μυλάσης καί Μελανουδίου)	1143		A minor theme comprising the territories in Asia Minor south of the Maeander valley, created from parts of the Cibyrrhaeot and Thracesian themes. Its existence continued under the Nicaean Empire.
Neokastra (Θέμα Νεοκάστρων)	between 1162 and 1173		Created from the northern Thracesian theme as part of Manuel Komnenos' reorganization of the Asiatic frontier. Its existence continued under the Nicaean Empire.
Philadelphia (Θέμα Φιλαδέλφειας)	12th century	Philadelphia	Briefly made into a separate Theme after the capture of Philadelphia in the First Crusade. Reincorporated into the Thracesian Theme in the end of 12th century, but now becoming its administrative center.

== See also ==
- Allotment system
- Roman province
- Tuntian

== Sources ==
- Angold, Michael (1975). A Byzantine Government in Exile: Government and Society Under the Laskarids of Nicaea (1204–1261). Oxford, United Kingdom: Oxford University Press. ISBN 0-19-821854-0.
- Ahrweiler, Hélène (1960), "Recherches sur l'administration de l'empire byzantin aux IX-XIème siècles", Bulletin de correspondance hellénique (in French), 84 (1): 1–111, doi:10.3406/bch.1960.1551
- Bréhier, Louis (2000) [1949], Les institutions de l'empire byzantin (in French), Paris: Albin Michel, ISBN 978-2-226-04722-9
- Bury, J. B.; Philotheus (1911). The Imperial Administrative System of the Ninth Century (With a Revised Text of the Kletorologion of Philotheos). London: Oxford University Press.
- Cheynet, Jean-Claude, ed. (2006), Le Monde Byzantin II: L'Empire byzantin (641–1204) (in French), Paris: Presses Universitaires de France, ISBN 978-2-13-052007-8
- Cheynet, Jean-Claude (2008), Administration de l'Asie Mineure byzantine (in French), Encyclopedia of the Hellenic World, Asia Minor
- Haldon, John F. (1990), Byzantium in the Seventh Century: The Transformation of a Culture, Cambridge University Press, ISBN 978-0-521-31917-1
- Haldon, John (1999). Warfare, State and Society in the Byzantine World, 565–1204. London: UCL Press. ISBN 1-85728-495-X.
- Kazhdan, Alexander, ed. (1991). The Oxford Dictionary of Byzantium. Oxford and New York: Oxford University Press. ISBN 0-19-504652-8.
- Krsmanović, Bojana (2008). The Byzantine Province in Change: On the Threshold Between the 10th and the 11th Century. Belgrade: Institute for Byzantine Studies. ISBN 9789603710608.
- Kühn, Hans-Joachim (1991), Die byzantinische Armee im 10. und 11. Jahrhundert: Studien zur Organisation der Tagmata (in German), Vienna: Fassbänder, ISBN 3-900538-23-9
- McGeer, Eric; Nesbitt, John; Oikonomides, Nicolas, eds. (2001). Catalogue of Byzantine Seals at Dumbarton Oaks and in the Fogg Museum of Art, Volume 4: The East. Vol. 4. Washington, DC: Dumbarton Oaks Research Library and Collection. ISBN 0-88402-282-X.
- Oikonomides, Nicolas (1972), Les listes de préséance byzantines des IXe et Xe siècles (in French), Paris: Editions du Centre National de la Recherche Scientifique
- Nikolaos, S. Akritidis (2003), Η εκκλησιαστική γεωγραφία του Οικουμενικού Πατριαρχείου: από τον 9ο αιώνα έως το 1453 [The ecclesiastical geography of the Ecumenical Patriarchate: from the 9th century to 1453] (in Greek), Aristotle University of Thessaloniki, doi:10.12681/eadd/20578, hdl:10442/hedi/20578
- Ostrogorsky, George (1997), History of the Byzantine State, Rutgers University Press, ISBN 978-0-8135-1198-6
- Pertusi, A. (1952). Constantino Porphyrogenito: De Thematibus (in Italian). Rome: Biblioteca Apostolica Vaticana.
- Runciman, Steven (1975), Byzantine civilisation, Taylor & Francis, ISBN 978-0-416-70380-1
- Salas, Brian William (2024). The Strategides and Themes: A Quantitative Approach to the Byzantine Empire's Administrative Structure (PhD Thesis). University of Chicago.
- Treadgold, Warren (1997). A History of the Byzantine State and Society. Stanford, California: Stanford University Press. ISBN 0-8047-2630-2.
- Treadgold, Warren T. (1998), Byzantium and Its Army, 284–1081, Stanford University Press, ISBN 0-8047-3163-2
- Whittow, Mark (1996). The Making of Byzantium, 600–1025. Berkeley and Los Angeles, California: University of California Press. ISBN 978-0-520-20496-6.
- Zakythinos, Dion A. (1948). "Μελέται περί της διοικητικής διαιρέσεως και της επαρχιακής διοικήσεως εν τω Βυζαντινώ κράτει" [Studies on administrative division and provincial administration in the Byzantine state]. Επετηρίς Εταιρείας Βυζαντινών Σπουδών (Society for Byzantine Studies) (in Greek).
