= Theme of Malagina =

The Theme of Malagina or Melagina (Greek: Θέμα Μελάγινων) was an administrative division (Theme) of the Byzantine Empire in the 12th century. Its capital was the castle of Malagina or Melangeia in Asia Minor.

The castle was mentioned to be a aplekton, as a place of preparation and reunion of the Imperial Army and a point of encounter with the Emperor while during a military campaign, where Malagina was a starting point. Before becoming its own Theme, Malagina was part of the Optimatoi Theme.

It was raised as a distinct administrative unit under the Komnemian Emperors due to its importance and exposure to Turkish raids; with a doukas and a stratopedarches in its upper government.

== Sources ==
- Nikolaos S. Akritidis, 2003, Aristotle University of Thessaloniki, Η εκκλησιαστική γεωγραφία του Οικουμενικού Πατριαρχείου: από τον 9ο αιώνα έως το 1453 (The ecclesiastical geography of the Ecumenical Patriarchate: from the 9th century to 1453), p. 168
- Zakythinos, Dionysios (1955). "Μελέται περὶ τῆς διοικητικῆς διαιρέσεως καὶ τῆς ἐπαρχιακῆς διοικήσεως ἐν τῷ Βυζαντινῷ κράτει" [Studies on the administrative division and provincial administration in the Byzantine state]. Ἐπετηρίς Ἐταιρείας Βυζαντινῶν Σπουδῶν (in Greek).
- Xanthopoulos, Th., Sceau de Manuel Lykaitès, Échos d’Orient 5 (1901-2) (in French).
