= Anchialos (theme) =

The Theme of Anchialos was a administrative division (Theme) of the Byzantine Empire, during the 11th and 12th centuries.

The Theme was mentioned in a chrysobull of the Emperor Alexios III to the Venetians, referring to the areas they could trade freely. The capital of the Theme was Anchialos, the modern-day Pomorie, in Bulgaria.

Ever since the end of the 11th century, Anchialos was the seat of a strategos, and in 1118, it was mentioned as being the seat of a doux.

The Theme was established in 1086 by Alexios I Komnenos, in response to a Pecheneg invasion. The primary task of this administrative unit was to strengthen the defenses in the mountain passes in the eastern half of the Haimos Mountains. Furthermore it had the role of providing bases to the Byzantine fleet, which was being reconstructed at the time, and in case large military vessels and squadrons needed to be dispatched from Constantinople to defend the area of the lower Danube in case of another Pecheneg invasion, or any other threat.

The Theme included the entire Black Sea coastline separated from the Theme of Thrace, and it included the important port cities of Mesembria, Develtos, and Sozopolis.

Known commanders:

- Vladtzertis, 11th century
- Siaous, 1118-?
- Konstantinos Stithatos, around 1186

== Sources ==
- Kyriazopoulos, Christos (1997, Aristotle University of Thessaloniki), Η Θράκη κατά τους 10ο - 12ο αιώνες: συμβολή στη μελέτη της πολιτικής, διοικητικής και εκκλησιαστικής της εξέλιξη (Thrace during the 10th - 12th centuries: a contribution to the study of its political, administrative and ecclesiastical development) (in Greek)
- Nikolaos, Akritidis (2003, Aristotle University of Thessaloniki) Η εκκλησιαστική γεωγραφία του Οικουμενικού Πατριαρχείου από τον 9ο αιώνα έως το 1453 (The ecclesiastical geography of the Ecumenical Patriarchate from the 9th century to 1453) (in Greek)
- Meško, Marek (2003), Alexios I Komnenos in the Balkans, 1081–1095
