= Boleron =

Historical region in southwestern Thrace

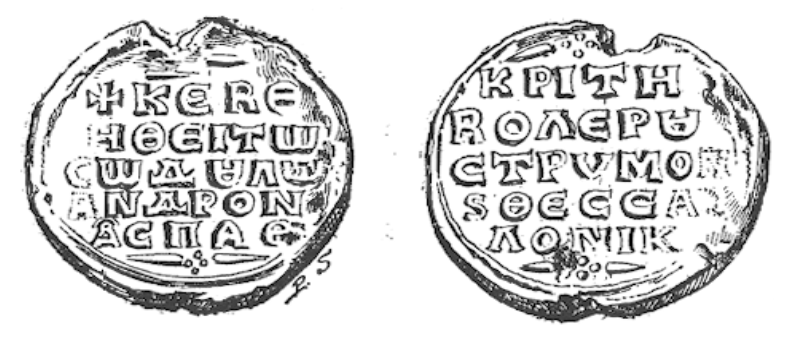
Seal of Andronikos, protospatharios and krites of Boleron, Strymon, and Thessalonica

Boleron (Greek: Βολερόν) was the name of a region and a Byzantine province in southwestern Thrace during the Middle Ages.

The region is first mentioned in the mid-9th century Life of Saint Gregory of Dekapolis, and designated the area enclosed between the Nestos River in the west, the Rhodope Mountains to the north, the Korpiles defile to the east, and the Aegean Sea to the south. In the early 11th century, it became a distinct administrative unit, but had a chequered history: a dioikesis (fiscal district) in 1047, it is attested as a separate theme—with at least two known banda, Mosynopolis and Peritheorion—in 1083, but most often it is found as part of a composite province along with the older themes of Thessalonica and Strymon.

After the dissolution of the Byzantine Empire following the Fourth Crusade, the region fell to the Kingdom of Thessalonica and followed its fortunes until its conquest by the Empire of Nicaea. In ca. 1246, John III Vatatzes reconstituted Boleron as the separate province of Boleron-Mosynopolis. In the early 14th century, under the Palaiologos emperors, it was again united with Strymon and Serres into a broader theme, but by 1344 it had declined in status, as a document dated to that year considers Boleron (along with Serres, Strymon, and other localities) a mere kastron (a small district centred on a fortified settlement), rather than proper themes.

== Sources ==
- Chatziantoniou, Elisavet (2012–2013). "Παρατηρήσεις σχετικά με την οικονομική διοίκηση του θέματος Βολερού, Στρυμόνος και Θεσσαλονίκης (11ος αι.)" [Observations regarding the Fiscal Administration of the theme of Boleros, Strymon, and Thessalonike (11th century)] (PDF). Byzantiaka (in Greek). 30. Thessaloniki: Hellenic Historical Society: 149–193. Archived from the original (PDF) on 2016-03-04.
- Gregory, Timothy E.; Kazhdan, Alexander (1991). "Boleron". In Kazhdan, Alexander (ed.). The Oxford Dictionary of Byzantium. Oxford and New York: Oxford University Press. p. 304. ISBN 0-19-504652-8.
