= Taktikon Uspensky =

Mid-9th century Greek document

The Taktikon Uspensky or Uspenskij is the conventional name of a mid-9th century Greek list of the civil, military and ecclesiastical offices of the Byzantine Empire and their precedence at the imperial court. Nicolas Oikonomides has dated it to 842/843, making it the first of a series of such documents (taktika) extant from the 9th and 10th centuries. The document is named after the Russian Byzantinist Fyodor Uspensky, who discovered it in the late 19th century in a 12th/13th-century manuscript (codex Hierosolymitanus gr. 39) in the library of the Eastern Orthodox Patriarchate of Jerusalem, which also contained a portion of the Kletorologion of Philotheos, a later taktikon.

== Sources ==
- Bury, J. B.; Philotheus (1911). The Imperial Administrative System of the Ninth Century (With a Revised Text of the Kletorologion of Philotheos). London: Oxford University Press.
- Kazhdan, Alexander, ed. (1991). The Oxford Dictionary of Byzantium. Oxford and New York: Oxford University Press. ISBN 0-19-504652-8.
- Oikonomidès, Nicolas (1972). Les listes de préséance byzantines des IXe et Xe siècles (in French). Paris: Éditions du Centre national de la recherche scientifique.
