= Theme of Koloneia (Albania) =

Theme of Koloneia (Epirus)
- Theme of the Byzantine Empire
- 1018 – 1380s
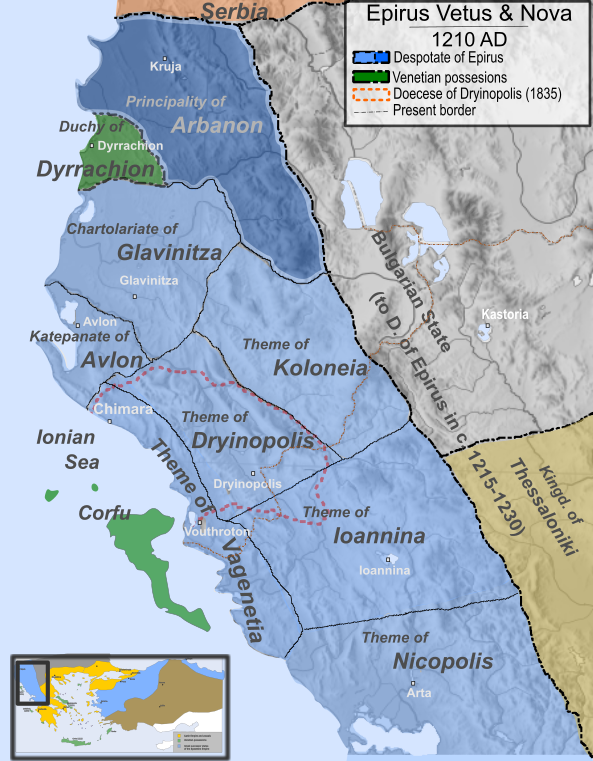
- The Theme of Koloneia among other Byzantine subdvisions in Epirus in 1210, as part of the Despotate of Epirus
- Capital: Koloneia
- Historical era: Middle Ages
  - Dissolution of the First Bulgarian Empire: 1018
  - Rise of the Zenebishi Clan: '1380s'

The Theme or Strategis of Koloneia, (Greek: Θέμα/Στρατηγίς Κολωνείας Ηπείρου) was an administrative division of the Byzantine Empire, one of the small frontier Themes created during the 11th and the 12th centuries. The seat of the division was in modern day Kolonjë (Greek: Κολωνεία), Albania.

It was created in 1018, after the death of Ivan Vladislav of Bulgaria and the dissolution of the First Bulgarian Empire. It was reported that the Emperor Basil II, after learning about the death of the Bulgarian Emperor, travelled to the newly conquered territories and there accepted the submission of the Bulgarian nobles and governors, and named generals, "Guardians of the Themes", in the cities. It was mentioned in a bull of Alexios II Komnenos as a Theme.

== Sources ==
- Kyriazopoulos, Christos (1997, Aristotle University of Thessaloniki (AUTH)) Η Θράκη κατά τους 10ο - 12ο αιώνες: συμβολή στη μελέτη της πολιτικής, διοικητικής και εκκλησιαστικής της εξέλιξη
