= Theme of Philadelphia =

Administrative division of the Byzantine Empire

The Theme of Philadelphia (Greek: Θέμα Φιλαδέλφειας) was an administrative division (Theme) of the Byzantine Empire created during the 12th century. The Theme included the city of Philadelphia and the surrounding areas, and was also a division of the Empire of Nicaea.

In the beginning of the 12th century, the military district of Philadelphia was already mentioned. The Theme was created approximatedly in the middle of the 12th century, and in the end of the same century, it already stopped being a separate Theme. Anna Komnene in her Alexiad mentions Constantine Gabras as the commandant of Philadelphia. In the end of 14th century, Philadelphia was fallen to the Ottoman Turks.

During the time of Constantine VII Porphyrogenitus, Philadelphia belonged to the Thracesian Theme. The wars with the Seljuks made it necessary to strength the city's garrisons, and later, to have its own military ruler. After the Capture of Nicaea (1097), commander-in-chief John Doukas recovered Philadelphia and Sardis, making Michael Kekaumenos the first commander of the captured cities. Later in 1109–1110, the general Eumathios Philokales had Philadelphia as his center of operation against the Turks. It is not clear if either in 1097 and 1109, the independent administration of the city had a permanent character.

== Sources ==
- Ragia, Euthimia (2004, National and Kapodistrian University of Athens (ΕΚΠΑ)), Η κοιλάδα του Μαιάνδρου (7ος-13ος αι.): γεωγραφία και ιστορία
- Zakythinos, Dion A. (1949) Επετηρίς Εταιρείας Βυζαντινών Σπουδών (Society for Byzantine studies), Μελέται περί της διοικητικής διαιρέσεως και της επαρχιακής διοικήσεως εν τω Βυζαντινώ κράτει (Studies on administrative division and provincial administration in the Byzantine state)
