= Annabel J. Wharton =

American art historian

Professor Annabel J. Wharton
- Born: Annabel Jane Wharton
- Occupation: William B. Hamilton Distinguished Professor of Art History at Duke University

Academic background
- Education: University of Wisconsin (BS); University of Chicago (MA); The Courtauld Institute of Art (PhD)

Academic work
- Discipline: History of Architecture
- Sub-discipline: History of design, Medieval architecture, History of art, Cultural studies

Annabel Jane Wharton (also known in print as Ann Wharton Epstein) is an American art historian with wide-ranging interests from Late Ancient & Byzantine art and culture through to modern architecture and its effect on ancient landscapes. She is currently William B. Hamilton Distinguished Professor of Art History at Duke University, North Carolina and has been working on a project regarding the use of new technologies for visualising historical materials.

In the 2014/2015 academic year, Wharton was Vincent Scully Visiting Professor at the Yale School of Architecture and the Harry W. Porter, Jr. Visiting Professor of Architectural History, University of Virginia School of Architecture in 2019.

== Early life and education ==
Wharton studied for a Bachelor of Science at the University of Wisconsin at Madison before transferring her allegiance to the humanities. She read for her Master of Arts degree at the University of Chicago, completing it in 1969, and then moved to England to undertake a PhD at the Courtauld Institute of Art in London Her thesis, completed in 1975, was entitled ‘The Date and Context of Some Cappadocian Rock-cut Churches’. While at the Courtauld, Wharton (recorded as A.W. Epstein) contributed photographs to the Conway Library that are currently being digitised by the Courtauld Institute of Art as part of the Courtauld Connects project.

== Career ==
Whilst undertaking her studies in England, Wharton lectured at the Barber Institute of Fine Arts at Birmingham University and has taught throughout her long career; the Marquis ‘Who’s Who’ lists her as a noteworthy humanities educator. She moved back to America and took up the post of Assistant Professor at Oberlin College, Ohio until 1979 when she moved to Duke University where she has remained in various posts in the Trinity College of Arts and Sciences either in the Art, Art History and Visual Studies Department or the Duke Centre for Jewish Studies.

She has also undertaken the post of editor of the Journal of Medieval and Early Modern Studies, was on the Board of Directors of the International Centre of Medieval Art (1986-1989) and has been involved with the Byzantine Studies Conference (now part of the Byzantine Studies Association of North America) both on the governing board (1979-1982) and as its president during the 1980–1981 term.

== Expertise and scholarship ==
Wharton has written numerous books, papers, and journal articles.

Her 1986 and 1988 books, Tokali Kilise: Tenth-Century Metropolitan Art in Byzantine Cappadocia and Art of Empire: Painting and Architecture of the Byzantine Periphery are cited in the second edition of Byzantine Art, part of the Oxford History of Art series.

Wharton's 1991 study of university campus architecture argued that the "landscaping and layout" of the West Campus at Duke (formerly the men's campus) encourage and facilitate "a supremacy of intellectual rigour", while the "lack of creative planning" evident at the East (women's) Campus showed a "disregard for and inattention to women students' intellectual needs".

Wharton's 2015 book Architectural Agents considered topics and architectures as varied as 20th- and 21st-century Las Vegas, the virtual worlds of Second Life, and ancient buildings in Jerusalem. Reviewing the book for The Times Higher Education, Richard J. Williams "provocative and entertaining book shows how buildings may have “agency”, and how “agency” may be destructive as much as constructive." Developing ideas formulated by Henri Lefebvre and Bruno Latour, Wharton examines how buildings, or other inanimate things, "do not have to be conscious to have agency".

== Fellowships and honours ==
- Visiting Fellow at Dumbarton Oaks, 1978–9.
- Fellow at the National Humanities Centre, 1985–6, 2002–3, 2016–17.
- Summer Stipends Award, National Endowment for the Humanities, 1992.
- Ailsa Mellon Bruce Senior Fellow, Centre for the Advanced Study of the Visual Arts, National Gallery of Art, Washington, D.C., 1993.
- Fellow, American Council of Learned Societies, 2002.

== Personal ==
In 1969, Annabel Wharton married the British historian James Epstein who is now Distinguished Emeritus Professor of History at Vanderbilt University. Wharton's long-term partner of nearly 30 years, Kalman P. Bland, Professor Emeritus of the Department of Religious Studies at Duke University, died in England in June 2017 after becoming ill whilst the couple were travelling together in Europe. A memorial celebration in his honour was held at the National Humanities Centre, North Carolina in September 2017.

== Selected publications ==
- “Scaffold, Model, Metaphor”, in A.R.P.A. Journal, Issue 4, May 2016.
- “Exhibition and Erasure/Art and Politics,” The Aggregate website, Volume 3, December 2016.
- Architectural Agents: The Delusional, Abusive, Addictive Lives of Buildings, Minneapolis : University of Minnesota Press, 2015 ISBN 1452943397
- Selling Jerusalem: Relics, Replicas, Theme Parks, University of Chicago Press, 2006, ISBN 9780226894225
- Building the Cold War: Hilton International Hotels and Modern Architecture, University of Chicago Press, 2001, ISBN 0226894193
- Refiguring the Post-Classical City: Dura Europos, Jerash, Jerusalem and Ravenna, Cambridge University Press, 1996, ISBN 0521481856
- "Gender, Architecture and Institutional Self-Presentation: The Case of Duke University.” South Atlantic Quarterly, vol. 90.1, 1991.
- Art of Empire: Painting and Architecture of the Byzantine Periphery, Pennsylvania State University Press, 1988, ISBN 0271004959

=== As Ann Wharton Epstein ===
- Tokali Kilise: Tenth-Century Metropolitan Art in Byzantine Cappadocia, Washington, D.C. : Dumbarton Oaks Research Library and Collection, 1986, ISBN 0884021459
- Change in Byzantine Culture in the Eleventh and Twelfth Centuries, (with A.P. Kazhdan), Berkeley, Los Angeles & London : California University Press, 1985, ISBN 0520069625
