= Tactica =

The term Tactica or Taktika (Greek: Τακτικά) can refer to:

Two Byzantine military treatises on tactics and strategy:

- the Tactica of Emperor Leo VI the Wise, written in the early 10th century and attributed to the emperor Leo VI the Wise
- the Tactica of Nikephoros Ouranos, written in the early 11th century by Nikephoros Ouranos, a Byzantine general

The treatises on administrative structure, court protocol and precedence written in the Byzantine Empire, collectively called "Taktika". These were:

- the Taktikon Uspensky, written c. 842
- the Kletorologion of Philotheos, written in 899
- the Taktikon Benešević, written in 934–944
- the Escorial Taktikon or Taktikon Oikonomides after its first editor, written c. 971–975
- the "Book of Offices" (Taktikon) of pseudo-Kodinos, written in the mid-14th century

== Firearms ==
- Saiga Taktika, a Russian combat shotgun

== Vehicle ==
- Alvis Tactica, British produced military vehicle
