= Escorial Taktikon =

Book that lists Byzantine offices, dignities, and titles

The Escorial Taktikon (other spellings: Escurial Taktikon, Escorial Tacticon, Escurial Tacticon), also known as the Taktikon Oikonomides after Nicolas Oikonomides who first edited it, is a list of Byzantine offices, dignities, and titles composed in Constantinople during the 970s (971–975 or 975–979). The list contains, among many entries, the commanders (strategoi) of the Byzantine Empire's eastern frontier during the Byzantine-Arab Wars, as well as a series of judicial offices.

== Sources ==
- Kazhdan, Alexander Petrovich, ed. (1991). Oxford Dictionary of Byzantium. New York, New York and Oxford, United Kingdom: Oxford University Press. ISBN 978-0-19-504652-6.
- Laiou, Angeliki E.; Simon, Dieter (1994). Law and Society in Byzantium, 9th-12th Centuries. Washington, District of Columbia: Dumbarton Oaks. ISBN 0-88402-222-6.
- Magdalino, Paul, ed. (2003). Byzantium in the Year 1000. Leiden, The Netherlands: Brill. ISBN 90-04-12097-1.
- de Souza, Philip; France, John (2008). War and Peace in Ancient and Medieval History. Cambridge, United Kingdom: Cambridge University Press. ISBN 978-0-521-81703-5.
