= Nikolaos Oikonomides =

Greek Byzantinist

Nikolaos or Nikos Oikonomides (Greek: Νικόλαος Οικονομίδης; 14 February 1934 – 31 May 2000) was a Greek Byzantinist, and one of the leading experts in the field of Byzantine administration.

== Biography ==
Oikonomides was born in Athens.

He studied in the University of Athens from 1951 to 1956, under the tutelage of Byzantinist Dionysios Zakythinos. After obtaining his degree, in 1958 he went to Paris to pursue doctoral studies under Paul Lemerle. His studies in Paris also introduced him to sigillography, and led to the discovery of the so-called Escorial Taktikon or Taktikon Oikonomides. The outcome of his work on Escorial Taktikon and the other Taktika (seating lists in Byzantine imperial banquets) was published in 1972, as the Les listes de préséance byzantines des IXe et Xe siècle, containing a translation and commentary on the Taktika. Oikonomides returned to Greece, but the establishment of the dictatorial Regime of the Colonels in 1967 forced him to go to exile in Canada along with his wife, the Ottomanist Elizabeth Zachariadou. In July 1969, he accepted the chair of Byzantine history at Montreal University, a post he kept until 1989, when he returned to Athens. He died on 31 May 2000 in Athens, and is survived by his wife and two daughters.

Besides the Listes de préséance, his major works include seven volumes of the Archives de l' Athos, a multi-volume work of the documents of the monasteries of Mount Athos begun by Paul Lemerle, as well as significant work on study and itemization of the extensive Dumbarton Oaks collection of Byzantine seals. His work there led to the creation of a new scientific journal, the Studies in Byzantine Sigillography, which he edited.

== List of major works ==
- Les listes de préséance byzantines des IXe et Xe siècles, Paris, 1972
- Fiscalité et exemption fiscale à Byzance (IXe-XIe s.), Athens 1996 ISBN 960-7094-65-4
- Social and economic life in Byzantium, Aldershot, 2004
- Society, Culture and Politics in Byzantium, Aldershot, 2005

== Sources ==
- Herrin, Judith (21 June 2000). "Nikolaos Oikonomides". The Guardian.
- Nesbitt, John; McGeer, Eric (2000). "Nicolas Oikonomides" (PDF). Dumbarton Oaks Papers. 54: ix–xii. Archived from the original on 2013-07-03.
