= Aegean Sea (theme) =

Byzantine province in the northern Aegean Sea

Theme of the Aegean Sea Αἰγαῖον Πελάγος, θέμα τοῦ Αἰγαίου Πελάγους
- Theme of the Byzantine Empire
- 843–1204
- Map of Byzantine Greece c. 900 AD, with the themes and major settlements.
- Historical era: Middle Ages
  - Established: 843
  - Fourth Crusade: 1204
Preceded by	Succeeded by
Asia (Roman province); Islands (Roman province)	Duchy of the Archipelago
- Today part of: Greece; Turkey

The Theme of the Aegean Sea (Greek: θέμα τοῦ Αἰγαίου Πελάγους, thema tou Aigaiou Pelagous) was a Byzantine province in the northern Aegean Sea, established in the mid-9th century. As one of the Byzantine Empire's three dedicated naval themes (Greek: θέματα ναυτικᾶ), it served chiefly to provide ships and troops for the Byzantine navy, but also served as a civil administrative circumscription.

== Origins ==
The theme has its origins in the late antique civil province of the "Islands" (Latin: Insulae; Greek: Nήσοι, romanized: Nēsoi), which encompassed the islands of the southeastern and eastern Aegean up to Tenedos. The term "Aigaion Pelagos" appears for the first time as an administrative circumscription in the early 8th century, when seals of several of its kommerkiarioi (customs officials) are attested. One seal, dated to 721/722, even refers to an official in charge of all the Greek islands, possibly implying an extension of the old province over the islands of the northern and western Aegean as well. Militarily, the Aegean islands came under control of the Karabisianoi corps and later of the Cibyrrhaeot Theme during the 7th and 8th centuries. In 726, the region participated in a rebellion against the iconoclast policies of emperor Leo III. Stephen, head of the fleet of the Cyclades islands, joined rebel leader Agallianos Kontoskeles in a failed attack on Constantinople. From the late 8th century, two separate commands appear in the Aegean: the droungarios of the Aegean Sea (Aigaion Pelagos), apparently controlling the northern half, and the droungarios "of the Twelve Islands" (Dodekanesos) or "of the Gulf" (Kolpos), in charge of the southern half. The latter command eventually evolved into the theme of Samos, while the former evolved into the theme of the Aegean Sea, encompassing both the islands of the northern Aegean as well as the Dardanelles and the southern coasts of the Propontis.

== History ==
The theme of the Aegean Sea must have been created in 843: its governing strategos does not appear in the Taktikon Uspensky of 842/843, which still lists the droungarios, but he is elsewhere attested as being active at Lesbos in 843.

The theme of the Aegean Sea was a regularly organized theme, subdivided into tourmai and banda and with a full complement of military, civil, and fiscal officials. In the areas of the Dardanelles and the Propontis, however, the droungarios and later the strategos of the Aegean probably shared authority with the Count of the Opsician Theme, to whose jurisdiction these territories properly belonged. The Count of the Opsicians probably retained authority over civil administration and local defence, while the Aegean theme was solely responsible for equipping ships and raising the men for fleets from these areas. A similar procedure existed in the theme of Samos as well. This view is strengthened by the fact that the Opsicians, and especially the Slavs (Sklabesianoi) forcefully settled by the Empire in the Opsician Theme, are attested serving as marines in the 10th century.

According to Emperor Constantine VII Porphyrogennetos (r. 913–959), in the early 10th century the theme included Lesbos (the seat of the strategos), Lemnos, Imbros and Tenedos, Chios (later transferred to Samos), the Sporades and the Cyclades. According to Hélène Ahrweiler, the Cyclades were probably transferred to the Aegean theme when the Dodekanesos/Kolpos naval command was broken up and the theme of Samos established from it in the late 9th century. In 911, the forces of the naval theme of the Aegean are recorded as being 2,610 oarsmen and 400 marines.

The province survived until the late 10th/early 11th century, when it became progressively split up into smaller commands. As the Cyclades and Sporades, Chios and the region of Abydos acquired their own strategoi, the theme of the Aegean became a purely civil province comprising only the coasts of the Propontis and the region around Constantinople. By the late 11th century, what remained of the old thematic fleet was incorporated into the unified imperial navy at Constantinople, under the command of the megas doux. Thereafter, some time in the 12th century, the theme of the Aegean seems to have been fused with the Opsician theme into a single province, as attested in the Partitio terrarum imperii Romaniae in 1204. The theme ceased to exist after the dissolution of the Byzantine Empire by the Fourth Crusade in 1204.

== Sources ==
- Ahrweiler, Hélène (1966). Byzance et la mer. La marine de guerre, la politique et les institutions maritimes de Byzance aux VIIe-XVe siècles (in French). Paris: Presses universitaires de France.
- Kazhdan, Alexander, ed. (1991). The Oxford Dictionary of Byzantium. Oxford and New York: Oxford University Press. ISBN 0-19-504652-8.
- Nesbitt, John; Oikonomides, Nicolas, eds. (1994). Catalogue of Byzantine Seals at Dumbarton Oaks and in the Fogg Museum of Art, Volume 2: South of the Balkans, the Islands, South of Asia Minor. Washington, DC: Dumbarton Oaks Research Library and Collection. ISBN 0-88402-226-9.
- Oikonomides, Nicolas (1972). Les listes de préséance byzantines des IXe et Xe siècles (in French). Paris: Editions du Centre National de la Recherche Scientifique.
- Treadgold, Warren T. (1995). Byzantium and Its Army, 284–1081. Stanford, California: Stanford University Press. ISBN 0-8047-3163-2.
