= Subdivisions of the Byzantine Empire =

The subdivisions of the Byzantine Empire were administrative units of the Eastern Roman or Byzantine Empire (330–1453). The Empire had a developed administrative system, which can be divided into three major periods: the late Roman/early Byzantine, which was a continuation and evolution of the system begun by the emperors Diocletian and Constantine the Great, which gradually evolved into the middle Byzantine, where the theme system predominated alongside a restructured central bureaucracy, and the late Byzantine, where the structure was more varied and decentralized and where feudal elements appeared.

== Early period: 4th–7th centuries ==
The classical administrative model, as exemplified by the Notitia Dignitatum, divided the late Roman Empire into provinces, which in turn were grouped into dioceses and then into praetorian prefectures.

The late Roman administrative system remained intact until the 530s, when Justinian I (r. 527–565) undertook his administrative reforms. He effectively abolished the dioceses, merged smaller provinces and created new types of jurisdictions like the quaestura exercitus, which combined civil with military authority, thus overturning the main principle of the Diocletianic system.

Under Maurice (r. 582–602), this was carried a step further with the exarchates of Italy and Africa, which became effectively semi-autonomous territories.

== Middle period: 7th–12th centuries ==
The traditional administrative system faced a severe challenge in the first half of the 7th century, when the Muslim conquests and the invasion of the Balkans by the Slavs led to extensive territorial loss. The only major contiguous territory remaining to the Empire was Asia Minor, and there in the period 640–660 the first themes (themata, sing. thema) were established. Initially these were simply military jurisdictions, reflecting the area that each of the Byzantine army's field armies occupied; underneath the themes and their strategoi, the old provinces continued to serve as the main administrative and fiscal units. Gradually however, the themes superseded the provinces, the last vestiges of which were abolished in the early 9th century inspired in part by the Hellenistic pagarchies and nomarchies of late Roman Egypt. Each theme had a regular and simple structure, being divided along military lines into tourmai, droungoi and banda. The droungos however was only a military, not an administrative division.

Alongside the themes, other types of provincial units existed. Peripheral territories, often with a strong maritime character like Crete, Crimea or Cephallenia were run by archons as in classical Greek times and are hence known as archontates (archontiai, sing. archontia). Along the eastern frontier with the Caliphate, distinct border provinces were created, the kleisourai. In the Balkans, Slavic tribes (Sclaveni) that came under Byzantine authority were usually allowed some form of limited self-governance under archons of their own. By the 10th century however, most of the archontates and kleisourai had been raised to themes themselves.

With the great military expansion of the 10th and early 11th centuries, new themes were established as land was recovered from the Arabs in the East and after the conquest of Bulgaria. Many of the new themes in the East were smaller than the old, comprising only a fortified town and its immediate area. Garrisoned chiefly by Armenians, these became known as the "Armenian" themes in contrast to the older, larger "Roman" themes. From ca. 970 until the mid-11th century, another military and administrative level appeared: regional commands which grouped several themes under a general termed duke (doux) or catepan (katepano) and hence usually rendered as duchies or catepanates in English.

In the Komnenian period, the themes continued to exist, now with a doux at their head. However, mainly in Greece, the themes dissolved into the smaller local fiscal and administrative units, the horia, episkepseis and chartoularata, which were tied to specific agencies and bureaux of the fiscal bureaucracy, as well as to individual magnates. The Komnenian system survived until the sack of Constantinople by the Fourth Crusade in 1204.

== Late period: 13th–15th centuries ==
Following the dissolution of the Byzantine state after the Fourth Crusade, its Byzantine Greek successor states maintained many of its features and structure.

The themes survived in the Empire of Nicaea and the post-1261 restored Byzantine Empire as a generic term for a territorial and fiscal circumscription. These were divided into katepanikia, which usually were little more than a town, where the governor or kephale ("head") resided, with its surrounding countryside. Minor kephalai were sometimes grouped into larger jurisdictions which were then placed under a "universal head" (katholike kephale).

The 14th century also saw the creation of several despotates as appanages for members of the imperial family, the most famous and long-lasting of which was the Despotate of the Morea.

In the Empire of Trebizond, the old banda of the theme of Chaldia remained extant, and formed the country's sole administrative subdivision.

== Terminology ==
Byzantine administrative terminology was initially based on Roman terms for various administrative offices and units, with common variants in both Latin and Greek languages. Since the Roman conquest, the Latin term for province (Latin: provincia) had an equivalent in eastern, Greek-speaking parts of the Empire. In the Greek language, province was called eparchy (Greek: ἐπαρχία, eparchia). That term was used both colloquially and officially, in Roman legal acts that were issued in the Greek language. In the same time, provincial governor was called eparch (Greek: ἔπαρχος, eparchos). Similar terms were employed for later praetorian prefects (Greek: ἔπαρχος τοῦ πραιτωρίου, "eparch of the praetorium"), who were in charge of the Empire's praetorian prefectures, and also to the Eparch of Constantinople, the city's urban prefect. Since the 7th century, the old provincial administration was gradually replaced by the thematic system. Even after that however, the term eparch remained in use until the 9th century as designation for the senior administrative official of each thema, under the governing strategos. Thereafter, eparchs were usually appointed as city governors, the most important amongst them still being the Eparch of Constantinople, whose office had wide-ranging powers and functioned continuously until the 13th century.

| Name | Greek name | Type | First | Last |
|---|---|---|---|---|
| eparchy ("province") | ἐπαρχία | civil province | traditional rendering of the Roman provincia | early 9th century |
| diocese | διοίκησις | regional group of provinces | 290s | 6th/7th centuries |
| praetorian prefecture | ἐπαρχότης / ὑπαρχία τῶν πραιτωρίων | large supra-regional circumscription | 330s | 6th/7th centuries |
| quaestura exercitus | | military-civil province | 536 | |
| exarchate | ἐξαρχᾶτον | military-civil province | 580s/590s | 698 (Carthage)/751 (Ravenna) |
| thema | θέμα | military-civil province | 640s/660s | |
| kleisoura | κλεισούρα | military province | | |
| archontate | ἀρχοντία | small-scale local district | | |
| tourma | τούρμα / τοῦρμα | military-civil province | | |
| bandon ("banner") | βάνδον | military-civil province | | |
| katepanikion | κατεπανίκιον | military-civil province | | |

== Sources ==
- Ostrogorsky, George (1956). History of the Byzantine State. Oxford: Basil Blackwell.
- Maksimović, Ljubomir (1988). The Byzantine Provincial Administration under the Palaiologoi. Amsterdam: Hakkert.
- Krsmanović, Bojana (2008). The Byzantine Province in Change: On the Threshold Between the 10th and the 11th Century. Belgrade: Institute for Byzantine Studies.
- Mason, Hugh J. (1974). Greek Terms for Roman Institutions: A Lexicon and Analysis. Toronto: Hakkert.
