= Verinopolis =

City and bishopric in ancient Galatia

Verinopolis or Berinopolis (Greek: Βηρινούπολις or Βερινούπολις) was a city and bishopric in ancient Galatia, central Anatolia (modern Turkey).

== History ==
The city is known only from its bishopric and as an administrative unit, from the 7th to the late 13th centuries. Its location is unknown, and its traditional identification (e.g. by William Mitchell Ramsay or Raymond Janin) with the late antique waystation of Aegonne or Euagina, localized near the modern settlement of Büyük Köhne (today Sorgun), is most probably incorrect.

The city is not known before the 7th century, but obviously existed earlier, since it was named or renamed from a previous, unknown name, in honour of Verina, wife of the Emperor Zeno. The city belonged to the Roman province of Galatia Prima, and later to the Bucellarian Theme, until Emperor Leo VI the Wise (r. 886–912– ) detached it (along with the neighbouring banda of Stavros or Stavropolis and Myriokephalon) to form the new tourma of Saniana in the theme of Charsianon.

In the Notitiae Episcopatuum of the Patriarchate of Constantinople, the bishopric of Verinopolis appears as a suffragan see of the Metropolis of Ancyra; in later lists, beginning with the Notitia 7, under Leo VI, it appears to have become a double bishopric together with Stavros/Stavropolis. Under Michael VIII Palaiologos (r. 1259–1282– ) it may have become an autocephalous archbishopric, or even a metropolis, but it vanished soon after.

=== Bishops ===
- Stephen, attended the Third Council of Constantinople (680) and the Quinisext Council (692)
- Anthimus, attended the Second Council of Nicaea in 787
- Sisinnius, attended the councils of Constantinople in 869/870 and 879/880
- Andronicus, attested in a list under Patriarch Alexios Stoudites (1025–1043), unclear whether he was of Verinopolis in Galatia, or Verinopolis in Lycaonia (Psibela).

== Sources ==
- Belke, Klaus (1984). Tabula Imperii Byzantini, Band 4: Galatien und Lykaonien (in German). Vienna: Verlag der Österreichischen Akademie der Wissenschaften. ISBN 978-3-7001-0634-0.
- Janin, Raymond (1935). "1. Bérinopolis". Dictionnaire d'histoire et de géographie ecclésiastiques. Vol. VIII"location=Paris. col. 496.
- Ramsay, William M. (1890). The Historical Geography of Asia Minor. London: John Murray.
