= Merarches =

Byzantine military rank

The merarchēs (Greek: μεράρχης), sometimes Anglicized as merarch, was a Byzantine military rank roughly equivalent to a divisional general.

== History ==
The title derives from the Greek words meros (Greek: μέρος, "part, division") and archein (ἄρχειν, "to rule, command"). The term merarchēs is attested for the first time in the late 6th century in the Stratēgikon, a military manual attributed to the Byzantine emperor Maurice (r. 582–602), although the historian Warren Treadgold has suggested that the rank and the corresponding formation date back to the reign of Emperor Zeno (r. 474–499). In the time of the Stratēgikon, a field army (commanded by a stratēgos) comprised usually three merē, each probably some five to seven thousand-strong. The meros in turn was divided into several moirai consisting of a number of tagmata or banda, each commanded by a doux.

This division was maintained in the later Byzantine army, although already from the 7th century, the term merarchēs became used less frequently, being dropped in favour of tourmarchēs; likewise, the tourma replaced the meros both in technical and common parlance. The equivalence of the two terms is explicitly attested in the Taktika of Emperor Leo VI the Wise (r. 886–912). The tourmai were now the major territorial and tactical subdivisions of a provincial army corps (thema). Each thema, again under a stratēgos, was normally divided into three tourmai, which in turn were further divided into droungoi (analogous to the older moirai) and then banda. Depending on the size of the thema, the number of the banda varied, and consequently the numerical strength for each meros/tourma could range from circa 1,000 to 5,000 men.

Since the merarchēs – also found in the corrupted form meriarchēs (Greek: μεριάρχης) – is sometimes distinguished in the sources (e.g. the Klētorologion of Philotheos) from the other tourmarchai, the scholar John B. Bury suggested that in the 9th and 10th centuries, the merarchēs was a distinct post, held by the tourmarchēs attached as an aide and deputy to the thematic stratēgos with no geographical area under his command, as opposed to the two "regular" tourmarchai. The discovery of a seal of a merarchēs of Knossos shows that they did hold territorial assignments, leading Alexander Kazhdan to reject Bury's hypothesis in the Oxford Dictionary of Byzantium. Military historian John Haldon, in his edition of the Three Treatises on Imperial Military Expeditions, in essence agreed with Bury's proposition, regarding the merarchēs as the commander of the tourma comprising the district where the thematic headquarters were located. According to Haldon, this would also explain his apparently lower rank relatively to the other tourmarchai, since he was a member of the stratēgos's staff and not an independent commander.

There are references to a Byzantine miriarcha in two Latin chronicles of southern Italy in the 11th century. The meaning of the title in this context is unclear and the name of the official is not recorded.

The title has been revived in the modern Hellenic Army, where merarchos (Greek: μέραρχος) is the term used for the CO of a Division or merarchia (Greek: μεραρχία), regardless of his actual rank.

== Sources ==
- Bury, J. B. (1911). The Imperial Administrative System of the Ninth Century – With a Revised Text of the Kletorologion of Philotheos. London: Oxford University Press. OCLC 1046639111.
- Falkenhausen, Vera von (1967). Untersuchungen über die byzantinische Herrschaft in Süditalien vom 9. bis ins 11. Jahrhundert. O. Harrassowitz.
- Haldon, John F. (1990). Constantine Porphyrogenitus: Three Treatises on Imperial Military Expeditions. Vienna: Verlag der Österreichischen Akademie der Wissenschaften.
- Kazhdan, Alexander, ed. (1991). The Oxford Dictionary of Byzantium. Oxford and New York: Oxford University Press. ISBN 0-19-504652-8.
- Treadgold, Warren T. (1995). Byzantium and Its Army, 284–1081. Stanford, California: Stanford University Press. ISBN 0-8047-3163-2.
