= Battle of Lemnos (1024) =

Battle in Aegean Sea in 1024

- Part of Rus'-Byzantine wars
Date	1024
Location	Lemnos
Result	Byzantine victory

Belligerents
Rus'	Byzantine Empire

Commanders and leaders
Chrysocheir	David of Ohrid; Nikephoros Kabasilas

The Battle of Lemnos in 1024 was the culmination of a raid by Kievan Rus' troops through the Dardanelles and into the Aegean Sea. It was the penultimate conflict between the Byzantine Empire and the Rus'.

The only source for the conflict is the history of John Skylitzes. According to Skylitzes, in 1024 a Rus' leader named Chrysocheir assembled 800 men and sailed to Constantinople, aiming to enlist in the Varangian Guard of Emperor Basil II (r. 976–1025). This Chrysocheir was a relative of the late Kievan prince Vladimir of Kiev, who had married the Emperor's sister Anna. His real name is unknown, and "Chrysocheir" is most likely a Greek translation of his name, meaning "gold-hand". Blondal proposed that it derived either from Old Norse Auðmundr, or from Old English Eadmund.

At Constantinople, Chrysocheir and his men were asked to surrender their weapons before being allowed into the city to enlist. The Rus' refused, and instead sailed south through the Propontis. The commander of the Dardanelles straits at Abydos tried to block their path, but they defeated him and sailed through the straits to the Aegean Sea. They then made for the island of Lemnos, where they were confronted by a much stronger Byzantine fleet, comprising the forces of the strategos of Samos David of Ohrid, the fleet of the Cibyrrhaeot Theme, and the troops of the doux of Thessalonica, Nikephoros Kabasilas. The Byzantine commanders initially pretended that they wanted to negotiate, so that the Rus' were lulled into false security. Then the Byzantines fell upon them suddenly and killed them all.

== Sources ==
- Blondal, Sigfus (1978). Varangians of Byzantium: An Aspect of Byzantine Military History. Translated by Benedikz, Benedikt S. Cambridge: Cambridge University Press. ISBN 0-521-21745-8.
- Lilie, Ralph-Johannes; Ludwig, Claudia; Pratsch, Thomas; Zielke, Beate (2013). Prosopographie der mittelbyzantinischen Zeit Online. Berlin-Brandenburgische Akademie der Wissenschaften. Nach Vorarbeiten F. Winkelmanns erstellt (in German). Berlin and Boston: De Gruyter.
- Wortley, John, ed. (2010). John Skylitzes: A Synopsis of Byzantine History, 811–1057. Cambridge: Cambridge University Press. ISBN 978-0-521-76705-7.
