= David of Ohrid =

Byzantine military commander

David of Ohrid (Greek: Δαβίδ ὁ ἀπὸ Ἀχριδῶν) was a Byzantine military commander.

In ca. 1024 he held the post of strategos of the naval theme of Samos. Along with the doux of Thessalonica Nikephoros Kabasilas and the fleet of the Cibyrrhaeot Theme, he confronted a Rus' raid into the Aegean Sea. After forcing their way past the Byzantine defences at the Dardanelles, the Rus', some 800 strong, had made landfall at Lemnos, where the Byzantine commanders confronted them. Feigning negotiations, the Byzantines fell upon the Rus' by surprised and annihilated them.

== Sources ==
- Lilie, Ralph-Johannes; Ludwig, Claudia; Pratsch, Thomas; Zielke, Beate (2013). Prosopographie der mittelbyzantinischen Zeit Online. Berlin-Brandenburgische Akademie der Wissenschaften. Nach Vorarbeiten F. Winkelmanns erstellt (in German). Berlin and Boston: De Gruyter.
