= Aspona =

Coordinates: 39°18′N 33°17′E

Aspona (Greek: Ἄσπονα, Ἄσπωνα) was an ancient city and bishopric in Galatia, in central Asia Minor. It corresponds to the modern settlement of Sarıhüyük (earlier Şedithüyük).

== History ==
The settlement lies some 80 km southeast of the capital of Turkey, Ankara. Archaeological evidence points to prehistoric occupation, but it is first documented in itineraries of the Roman Empire, such as the Itinerarium Antonini or the Tabula Peutingeriana, and was recognized as a city (civitas) since the 4th century. Emperor Jovian passed through the city in 363. A bishop of Aspona, suffragan of the Metropolis of Ancyra, is attested since the Council of Serdica in 343. The city belonged to the Roman province of Galatia Prima. Under Emperor Leo VI the Wise (r. 886–912– ), the topoteresia Asponas was one of the four banda, collectively designated as ta Kommata, of the Bucellarian Theme that were transferred to the new Theme of Cappadocia. According to the Notitiae Episcopatuum of the Patriarchate of Constantinople, the see remained a suffragan of Ancyra until the 12th century, but in the late 13th century, it appears to have been briefly autocephalous, or even to have been raised to metropolitan status itself. Today several Roman and Byzantine spolia can be found, reused in the village of Sarıhüyük. The medieval town wall has been torn down, including the foundations, and reused in other buildings, but its parts of its circuit survive as a ditch.

=== Bishops ===
Eight of its bishops are known:

- Catherius, who signed the acts of the Eastern bishops at the Council of Serdica (343)
- Palladius of Galatia, who composed the Lausiac History, (c. 417)
- Eusebius, in 431 at the Council of Ephesus
- Hyperechius, in 451 at the Council of Chalcedon
- Euphanius, signed in 458 the letter of the bishops of Galatia Prima to Emperor Leo I the Thracian
- Michael, participant in the Third Council of Constantinople in 680 and in the Quinisext Council in 692
- Peter, attended the Second Council of Nicaea in 787
- Nicephorus, participated in the councils of Constantinople in 869/870 and 879/880

== Catholic titular see ==
The diocese was nominally restored in 1933 as a Latin Rite titular bishopric by the Roman Catholic Church. It has had following incumbents:

- Vicente P. Reyes (1950.06.12 – 1961.01.19) as Auxiliary Bishop of the Archdiocese of Manila (Philippines)
- Carlo Re, I.M.C. (1961.02.10 – death 1978.08.12) as emeritate

== Sources ==
- Belke, Klaus (1984). "Aspona". Tabula Imperii Byzantini, Band 4: Galatien und Lykaonien (in German). Vienna: Verlag der Österreichischen Akademie der Wissenschaften. p. 135. ISBN 978-3-7001-0634-0.
