= Nikephoros Kabasilas =

Byzantine military commander

Nikephoros Kabasilas (Greek: Νικηφόρος Καβάσιλας) was a Byzantine military commander.

In c. 1024, he held the post of doux of Thessalonica. Along with David of Ohrid, the strategos of Samos, and the fleet of the Cibyrrhaeots, he confronted a Rus' raid into the Aegean Sea. After forcing their way past the Byzantine defences at the Dardanelles, the Rus', some 800 strong, had made landfall at Lemnos, where the Byzantine commanders confronted them. Feigning negotiations, the Byzantines fell upon the Rus' by surprise and annihilated them.

== Sources ==
- Lilie, Ralph-Johannes; Ludwig, Claudia; Zielke, Beate; Pratsch, Thomas, eds. (2013). "Prosopographie der mittelbyzantinischen Zeit Online". Prosopographie der mittelbyzantinischen Zeit Online. Berlin-Brandenburgische Akademie der Wissenschaften. Nach Vorarbeiten F. Winkelmanns erstellt (in German). De Gruyter.
