= Kommata =

Coordinates: 39°00′N 33°00′E

Kommata (Greek: τὰ Κόμματα) was a historical region and administrative unit of the Byzantine Empire in southern Galatia (central Anatolia), in modern Turkey.

== History ==
The origin of the name is unknown, but may refer to a locality, or fortress, somewhere south of Ankara. it is first mentioned in 872, as being the target of a raid by the Paulicians under Chrysocheir, shortly before they were defeated by the Byzantine army at the Battle of Bathys Ryax.

Emperor Leo VI the Wise (r. 886–912) created the tourma of Kommata out of four banda of the Bucellarian Theme (Aspona, Akarkous, Bareta, Balbadona) and three banda of the Anatolic Theme (Eudokias, Hagios Agapetos, Aphrazeia), and assigned it to the Theme of Cappadocia. The tourma and region of Kommata thus encompassed the area between the Halys River in the east, Lake Tatta in the south, and the Sangarios River in the west.

== Sources ==
- Belke, Klaus (1984). Tabula Imperii Byzantini, Band 4: Galatien und Lykaonien (in German). Vienna: Verlag der Österreichischen Akademie der Wissenschaften. ISBN 978-3-7001-0634-0.
