= Cappadocia (theme) =

Province of the Byzantine Empire

Theme of Cappadocia Καππαδοκία, θέμα Καππαδοκίας, θέμα Καππαδοκῶν
- Theme of the Byzantine Empire
- c. 830–1073
- The Asian themes of the Byzantine Empire c. 842.
- Capital: Koron
- Historical era: Middle Ages
  - Establishment as a theme: c. 830
  - Fall to the Seljuks.: 1073
- Today part of: Turkey

The Theme of Cappadocia (Greek: θέμα Καππαδοκίας) was a Byzantine theme (a military-civilian province) encompassing the southern portion of the namesake region from the early 9th to the late 11th centuries.

== Location ==
The theme comprised most of the late antique Roman province of Cappadocia Secunda and parts of Cappadocia Prima. By the early 10th century, it was bounded to the northwest by the Bucellarian Theme, roughly along the line of the Lake Tatta and Mocissus; the Armeniac Theme and later Charsianon to the north, across the river Halys, and to the northeast near Caesarea and the fortress of Rodentos; to the south by the Taurus Mountains and the border with the Caliphate's lands and the Thughur frontier zone in Cilicia; and to the east with the Anatolic Theme, the boundary stretching across Lycaonia from the area of Heraclea Cybistra to Tatta.

== History ==
Lying directly north of the Cilician Gates, the Arabs' major invasion route into Asia Minor, the region of Cappadocia suffered greatly from their repeated raids, with its towns and fortresses regularly sacked and the country widely devastated and depopulated. The cities of Tyana, Heraclea Cybistra and Faustinopolis had all been razed by the Arabs in the early 9th century, and although Cybistra was rebuilt, the populations of the other two cities fled to the fortresses of Nigde and Loulon respectively.

Initially, the later theme was a tourma (division) of the Anatolic Theme. To counter the Arab threat, it was detached as a separate frontier march (a kleisoura) and eventually raised to a full theme. It is first attested as such in 830. According to the Muslim geographers Ibn Khordadbeh and Ibn al-Faqih, the province was heavily fortified with over twenty towns and fortresses, and had a garrison of 4,000 men in the 9th century. The theme was also the site of no less than three imperial aplekta, large camps that served as assembly points for the thematic armies during campaigns: Koloneia, Caesarea, and Bathys Ryax. Its strategos, whose seat was probably the fortress of Koron (modern Çömlekçi), and perhaps Tyana at a later stage, drew an annual salary of 20 pounds of gold, and usually held the rank of protospatharios, with a few rising as far as patrikios.

The Arab raids remained frequent in the 9th century, and an Arab army occupied Loulon, one of the key fortresses guarding the northern exit of the Cilician Gates, in 833–879. From the great Byzantine victory at the Battle of Lalakaon in 863, and the destruction of the Paulician state at Tephrike in 872 (or 878) onwards the security situation improved considerably, but the area remained a target of Arab raids. In 897, an Arab raid even sacked the thematic capital, Koron.

Under Emperor Leo VI the Wise (r. 886–912), some of its eastern territory, the bandon of Nyssa, in which Caesarea lay, as well as the tourma of Kase were given to the Charsianon theme. In turn, the theme of Cappadocia was expanded to the northwest to the area of the Salt Lake with territory from the Anatolic and Bucellarian themes, forming the seven banda of the new tourma of Kommata.

The fall of Melitene in 934 and the conquests of John Kourkouas removed the immediate threat to the theme. In the 10th century, the depopulated region was settled by Armenians and Syriac Christians. Cappadocia as a whole also became a major power base of the Anatolian military aristocracy – in particular the Phokas and Maleinos clans – whose extensive estates, large wealth and military prestige posed a serious challenge to the central imperial government and led to successive revolts in the second half of the 10th century. The magnates' power was broken through the confiscation of their estates under Emperor Basil II (r. 976–1025).

Extensive Armenian settlement occurred in the first half of the 11th century, and the first Seljuk raids in the area began c. 1050 and intensified over the next two decades. After the Battle of Manzikert in 1071, most of Cappadocia was lost to the Seljuks. A "toparches of Cappadocia and Choma", however, appears as late as 1081 either implying continued Byzantine control in parts of western Cappadocia or simply the survival of the title.

== See also ==
- Elena Ene Drăghici-Vasilescu, Byzantine and Medieval Cappadocia, Glendale, CA: Scientific Research Publishing, 2024

== Sources ==
- Gyftopoulou, Sofia (July 8, 2003). "Καππαδοκίας Θέμα". Encyclopaedia of the Hellenic World: Asia Minor. Athens, Greece: Foundation of the Hellenic World. Archived from the original on 2021-06-03.
- Kazhdan, Alexander, ed. (1991). The Oxford Dictionary of Byzantium. Oxford and New York: Oxford University Press. ISBN 0-19-504652-8.
- Leveniotis, Georgios Athanasios (2007). Η πολιτική κατάρρευση του Βυζαντίου στην Ανατολή: το ανατολικό σύνορο και η κεντρική Μικρά Ασία κατά το β' ήμισυ του 11ου αι [The Political Collapse of Byzantium in the East: The Eastern Frontier and Central Asia Minor During the Second Half of the 11th Century] (PhD thesis) (in Greek). Aristotle University of Thessaloniki. doi:10.12681/eadd/19246. hdl:10442/hedi/19246.
- McGeer, Eric; Nesbitt, John; Oikonomides, Nicolas, eds. (2001). Catalogue of Byzantine Seals at Dumbarton Oaks and in the Fogg Museum of Art, Volume 4: The East. Washington, DC: Dumbarton Oaks Research Library and Collection. ISBN 0-88402-282-X.
- Mitchell, S.; Talbert, R.; Elliott, T.; Gillies, S. (2012). "[Koron]: a Pleiades place resource". Pleiades: A Gazetteer of Past Places.
- Pertusi, A. (1952). Constantino Porfirogenito: De Thematibus (in Italian). Rome, Italy: Biblioteca Apostolica Vaticana.

{{Ene Drăghici-Vasilescu, Elena, Byzantine and Medieval Cappadocia, 2024, Glendale, California: Scientific Research Publishing, https://www.amazon.com/Byzantine-Medieval-Cappadocia-Elena-Dr%C4%83ghici-Vasilescu/dp/1649979584}}

- Treadgold, Warren T. (1995). Byzantium and Its Army, 284–1081. Stanford, California: Stanford University Press. ISBN 0-8047-3163-2.
