= Metropolis of Ancyra =

Christian bishopric in Turkey (3rd century to 1923)

The Metropolis of Ancyra (Greek: Μητρόπολις Ἀγκύρας) was a Christian (Eastern Orthodox after the East–West Schism) bishopric in Ancyra (modern Ankara, Turkey) and metropolitan see of Galatia Prima. The see survived the Seljuk Turkish conquest at the end of the 11th century, and remained active until the end of the Ottoman Empire and the population exchange between Greece and Turkey in 1923.

== History ==
=== Early Christianity ===
The city of Ancyra had been the political centre of the Roman province of Galatia since its establishment in 25 BC. The arrival of Christianity in Ancyra is probably to be dated to the time of the Apostles in the mid-1st century AD but is attested in the sources only much later. Modern historians suggest that Apostles Peter and Andrew in person preached in the city, and founded the local Church, with a certain Cresces, a disciple of the Paul the Apostle, who lived between 56 and 117 AD, as the city's first bishop. The existence of a Christian church in Ancyra is not attested until around 180, and the earliest attested bishop, however, is Theodore, who became a martyr during one of the anti-Christian persecutions of the 3rd century. Other important early Christian martyrs, who developed a considerable local cult, were Plato of Ancyra and Clement of Ancyra.

The city is well known during the 4th century as a centre of Christian activity: Bishop Marcellus of Ancyra and Basil of Ancyra were active in the theological controversies of their day, and the city was the site of no less than three church synods in 314, in 358, and in 375, the latter two in favour of Arianism. Emperor Julian (r. 361–363) visited the city during his ill-fated Persian campaign in 362, and reportedly ordered the execution of the martyrs Basil and Gemellus; a third condemned, Busiris, was spared his life.

=== Byzantine period ===
When the province of Galatia was divided sometime in 396/99, Ancyra remained the civil capital of Galatia Prima, as well as becoming its ecclesiastical centre (metropolitan see). Nevertheless, the official titulature of the Metropolitans of Ancyra remained "hypertimos and exarch of all Galatia" throughout the see's existence. Its original suffragan sees in the Notitiae Episcopatuum were Aspona, Juliopolis, Kinna, Lagania (Anastasiopolis), Mnizus, and Tabia. To them were added Verinopolis in the 7th century, and Kalymne in the 9th century. Among the metropolitan sees subject to the Patriarchate of Constantinople, Ancyra occupied a high place, coming fourth after Caesarea in Cappadocia, Ephesus, and Heraclea in Thrace.

Some information about the ecclesiastical affairs of the city during the early 5th century is found in the works of Palladius of Galatia and Nilus of Ancyra. Two convents for women are attested in the 6th century (one dedicated to the Theotokos Beeia and the Monastery of Petrin), and a male monastery called Attaline is attested in the 7th century. Despite the reduction of the town's size to a small fortified core after the Persian conquest in 622, Ancyra remained an important centre in subsequent centuries, as the capital of the Opsician Theme from the mid-7th to the late 8th century, and of the Bucellarian Theme thereafter.

Under Constantine X Doukas (r. 1059–1067), the suffragan bishopric of Basilaion (Juliopolis) was raised to metropolitan rank to honour its incumbent, but although the elevation was intended to be temporary, after the latter died, his successors continued to claim metropolitan status. This led to a dispute between Emperor Alexios I Komnenos (r. 1081–1118) and Metropolitan Niketas of Ancyra, which ended with Basilaion retaining its new status. Apart from Basilaion/Juliopolis, the sees of Aspona and Verinopolis also appear to have been temporarily lost to Ancyra.

=== Turkish rule and Ottoman period ===
The city fell to the Seljuk Turks in the decade after the Battle of Manzikert (1071), and remained under Turkish rule thereafter, with the exception of a brief period of restored Byzantine control after 1101. The Turkish conquest meant the isolation of Ancyra, at least until the Ottoman period, from the Constantinople and the Patriarchate, and began a prolonged period of decline of the local Christian population. As a result, it is often unclear whether the metropolitans from the 12th century onwards resided in their see; until the early 17th century, there are many documented cases of the administration of the see being given to other metropolises. Nevertheless, the Metropolis of Ancyra continued to exist until the Greco-Turkish population exchange of 1923.

In the second half of the 12th century the see of Ancyra was temporarily united to that of Nazianzus, while in 1173, the patriarchal synod allowed the incumbent metropolitan to transfer to the see of Kerasus, which was still in Byzantine hands. A Christian population in the city is attested during the reign of Andronikos II Palaiologos (r. 1282–1328) in the story of the neomartyr Niketas, who was lector at a church in Ancyra. At the same time, however, the sources register complaints that the Metropolitan had abandoned his see, and in 1310/14 the territory of Ancyra was transferred to the Metropolis of Gangra, while the incumbent received the sees of Philippi and Chrysopolis in Thrace as compensation. During the second half of the 14th century, the Notitiae 19 and 20 record that the Metropolis of Ancyra had been awarded to the Metropolitan of Thessalonica, but in 1395–1406 there was again a Metropolitan of Ancyra, Macarius, a distinguished theologian who accompanied Emperor Manuel II Palaiologos in his voyage to Western Europe. After 1406 Ancyra was again awarded to Gangra, but in 1438 the see is held by the Metropolitan of Cyzicus; a Metropolitan of Ancyra Constantine is attested c. 1450, but in councils held in Constantinople (now under Ottoman rule) in 1471/72 and 1483/84, Ancyra was represented (and possibly again held) by Thessalonica; in between, however, in 1475, an incumbent metropolitan is attested as attending the ordination of Patriarch Raphael I of Constantinople. The situation is further confused by the reference to an active metropolis in patriarchal ordinances of 1483 and 1525. The situation is clearer beginning with the metropolitanate of Parthenius (1602–1631), who appears to have resided in his see, and engaged himself in trying to restore its flock and finances, that had suffered greatly as a result of the Celali rebellions in the previous decades. Parthenius' successors were most likely likewise residents of Ankara. However, accurate information on the incumbents is only available from the middle of the 19th century on.

The local Christian population declined quickly during the first centuries after the Turkish conquest. In the Ottoman tax registers of 1488/89, in the entirety of the Sanjak of Ankara, a total of 822 households owing the jizya (the per capital tax on non-Muslims) are recorded. In 1522, the number of Christian households is estimated at 277, and the respective population at 1,500, as against 15,000 Muslims and around 200 Jews. The registers also indicate that Armenian names, and hence followers of the Armenian Church, predominated among the local Christian population. The existence of Greek Orthodox population alongside Armenians and Jews is confirmed by the German traveller Dernschwam in 1553. This reflects a situation that was still apparent in the 1880s, when the French ethnologist Vital Cuinet estimated the Christian population of the Ankara Vilayet at 34,009 Greek Orthodox, 83,063 Armenians of the Armenian Church, and smaller Armenian Catholic and Protestant communities. The numerical weakness of the flock was one reason for the frequent absence of a residential Metropolitan in the 15th–16th centuries. More importantly, the Christian population that remained was dispersed and isolated in small communities, with low social, educational, and financial standing, who suffered further decline during the Celali rebellions. In order to counterbalance this, on the suggestion of Metropolitan Parthenius, in 1610 a number of towns (Tilhissar, İnebolu, and Tosya) were transferred from the Metropolis of Gangra; the latter never acquiesced to this, however, and within the next few decades secured their return.

Greek Orthodox metropolises in Asia Minor, ca. 1880.

The Metropolis of Ancyra retained its traditional high rank among the metropolises of the Patriarchate of Constantinople, at least until 1715, when it is still recorded in the fourth place in the Syntagmation of Chrysanthos of Jerusalem. In the list of Patriarch Seraphim II of Constantinople in 1759, however, it was demoted to 31st place; it fell further to 32nd by 1855, but rose again to 29th by 1901. Nevertheless, the same period saw a considerable turnaround in the fortunes of the local Greek population. The powerful Çapanoglu family restored order and prosperity in the area in the 18th century, and the upturn in trade benefited the local Christian population, which was also increased by the immigration of Cappadocian Greeks from the area of Caesarea (Kayseri) and of Pontic Greeks, seeking employment in the Ak Dağ mines. As a result of the Cappadocian immigration, however, it is likely that the Orthodox of the sanjaks of Yozgat, Çorum and Kirşehir, which along with the Sanjak of Ankara constituted the Ankara Vilayet, were under the jurisdiction of the Metropolis of Caesarea rather than Ancyra.

In the late 19th century, the Metropolis of Ancyra comprised the Sanjak of Ankara in the Ankara Vilayet and the kazas of Kütahya and Eskişehir in the Hüdavendigâr Vilayet. Its actual size however was even smaller, as Orthodox communities resided only in eight settlements: Ankara, the town of Haymana, and the villages of Dikmen and Köceren in the Sanjak of Ankara, and Kütahya, Eskişehir, and the villages of İspir and Köçoğlu near the latter. At the beginning of the 20th century, the annual income of the metropolis was estimated at 200,000 piastres, and according to the registers of the Patriarchate of Constantinople, comprised a flock of 10,598 in 1913/14, of which 2,251 in Ankara (up from 1,637 in 1881), 4,398 in Kütahya (4,050 in the 1880s), 407 in Haymana (23 in 1881), 2,952 or 1,941 in Eskişehir (1,147 in the 1880s), and the rest in the smaller settlements. This reflects the important role played to the metropolis' numerical strength by the communities further west, around Kütahya and Eskişehir, which had been incorporated into it at some unknown point. The Metropolis of Ancyra still remained one of the smaller metropolises in Asia Minor during the late Ottoman period; only the metropolises of Philadelphia and Kydoniai were smaller still. The local Christians were mostly Turcophone (Karamanlides). Only the higher clergy, government officials, and headmasters of schools were Greek-speakers, although the foundation of Greek schools in the 1870s and 1880s increased the knowledge of Greek.

Following the population exchange, and the departure of all Christians in the region, the last incumbent, Metropolitan Constantine (1922–1934), resided in Istanbul.

== List of known bishops ==
- Saint Theodore
- Saint Clement of Ancyra (ca. 312)
- Pancratius
- Marcellus (314–335), removed for heresy
- Basil (336–348)
- Marcellus (348–350, restored, 2nd tenure)
- Basil (350–360, exiled for his semi-Arian views)
- Athanasius (360–373)
- Anonymous (ca. 381, Arian)
- Arabianus (ca. 394–400)
- Leontius (404)
- Theodotus (ca. 431, Nestorian)
- Eusebius (before 446 – after 451)
- Anastasius (458)
- Dorotheus I (executed 513)
- Elpidius (536)
- Domitian (537)
- Dorotheus II (550)
- Frontinus (562)
- Paul (ca. 582–595)
- Plato (680)
- Stephen I (692)
- Basil II (787)
- Theodoulos (869/870)
- Daniel I (879/880)
- Theophylact (892)
- Gabriel (ca. 907–912)
- John (997)
- Michael I (1032)
- Nicholas (ca. 1037)
- Michael II (under Michael I Cerularius, 1043–1058)
- Anonymous (1067)
- Nicetas (1082 or 1102)
- Anonymous (ca. 1140–1151)
- Stephen II (1156)
- Christopher (1232)
- Gregory (1260)
- Babylas (1320)
- Anonymous (1399)
- Macarius (early 15th century)
- Constantine (ca. 1450)
- Macarius (1460)
- Metropolitan of Sebasteia, as locum tenens (1465)
- Germanus
- Metropolitan of Corinth, as locum tenens (before 1517)
- Gerasimus (1561)
- Matthew (1590)
- Sabbatius (1596)
- Parthenius (1602–1631)
- Arsenius
- Gregory (uncertain)
- Laurentius (1636–1655)
- Germanus (1655–1665)
- Gerasimus II (1668)
- Seraphim (from 1670)
- Athanasius (1679)
- Joachim (1698)
- Macarius II (ca. 1710)
- Meletius (ca. 1713)
- Neophytus (1721)
- Clement, Metropolitan of Ioannina, as locum tenens (1732)
- Joannicius (1740)
- Anthimus (1765)
- Seraphim of Pisidia (1774 – ca. 1780)
- Matthew II (1783)
- ?Macarius (1788)
- Joannicius II (1793– 1811)
- Sophronius (1811–1814)
- Methodius (1814–1823)
- Cyril (1823)
- Agathangelus (1823–1826)
- Gerasimus III Domninos (1832)
- Sophronius II (1835)
- Macarius III (1836)
- Cyril II (1836)
- Nicephorus (1838)
- Hierotheus (1845)
- Meletius II (1852)
- Joannicius III (1860)
- Gerasimus IV (1868)
- Chrysanthus (1872–1877)
- Nicholas (1899–1902)
- Sophronius III (1902)
- Gervasius Sarasitis (1910–1922)
- Constantine (1922–1934)

== Sources ==
- Belke, Klaus; Restle, Marcell (1984). "Ankyra". Tabula Imperii Byzantini, Band 4: Galatien und Lykaonien (in German). Vienna: Verlag der Österreichischen Akademie der Wissenschaften. pp. 126–130. ISBN 978-3-7001-0634-0.
- Karalevsky, C. (1914). "Ancyre – Métropole grecque". Dictionnaire d'Histoire et de Géographie ecclésiastiques (in French). Vol. II. Paris. cols. 1538–1543.
- Kiminas, Demetrius (2009). The Ecumenical Patriarchate: A History of Its Metropolitanates with Annotated Hierarch Catalogs. Wildside Press LLC. ISBN 9781434458766.
- Le Quien, Michel (1740). Oriens Christianus, in quatuor Patriarchatus digestus: quo exhibentur ecclesiæ, patriarchæ, cæterique præsules totius Orientis. Tomus primus: tres magnas complectens diœceses Ponti, Asiæ & Thraciæ, Patriarchatui Constantinopolitano subjectas (in Latin). Paris: Ex Typographia Regia. cols. 455–474. OCLC 955922585.
- Moustakas, Konstantinos (2002). "Αγκύρας Μητρόπολις (Οθωμανική Περίοδος)" [Metropolis of Ancyra (Ottoman Period)]. Encyclopaedia of the Hellenic World, Asia Minor (in Greek).
