= Homadena =

Town of ancient Phrygi

Coordinates: 38°14′11″N 29°59′31″E

Homadena was a town of ancient Phrygia on the road from Apamea to Eumeneia, inhabited during Roman and Byzantine times. Its name does not occur in ancient authors but is inferred from epigraphic and other evidence.

Its site is located near Gümüşsu (formerly, Homa) in Asiatic Turkey.
