= Choma (fortress) =

Byzantine fortress in central Anatolia

Choma (Greek: Χῶμα, romanized: Chōma) was a Byzantine fortress in central Anatolia, which played an important role in the fight against the Seljuk Turks in the late 11th and 12th centuries. It was located at the ruins now called Akkale, on the rocky summit of Akdağ 4 km north of Homa (now called Gümüşsu). It should not be confused with the Choma in Lycia.

Choma was located in the upper valley of the Maeander River in Phrygia. After the Battle of Manzikert, it became an isolated Byzantine outpost surrounded by Turkish-controlled territory. Its troops, the so-called Chomatenoi (Χωματηνοί), figure frequently in the campaigns of Nikephoros III Botaneiates (r. 1078–1081) and Alexios I Komnenos (r. 1081–1118). Due to its strategic location on one of the roads leading to the interior of Anatolia, it became a major base of operations for the Komnenian emperors' campaigns to push back the Turks. In the 12th century, it formed its own district, that of "Choma and Cappadocia", under a toparches. This district appears to have been mostly coextensive with the bandon of Lampe.

Choma remained under constant Turkish threat throughout the 12th century. Emperor Isaac II Angelos (r. 1185–1195, 1203–1204) refortified it in 1193, and renamed it Angelokastron (Ἀγγελόκαστρον) after his dynasty. Choma finally fell to the Turks a short time after the dissolution of the Byzantine Empire by the Fourth Crusade in 1204.

The nearby fortress of Soublaion, which was rebuilt by Emperor Manuel I Komnenos (r. 1143–1180) in 1175 but abandoned after the Battle of Myriokephalon the next year, was formerly identified by William Mitchell Ramsay with Choma.

Today only small traces of the fortifications remain. There are also two red-plastered cisterns. On the eastern slope, the fortress walls have collapsed except for parts of a rectangular building that may have been a tower. Bricks are embedded in the two-shell masonry with mortar, and miscellaneous bricks and ceramics were found on top of the burial ground. W.J. Hamilton found broken columns of unknown provenance at the burial site below Homa. 4 km west there is a small hill called Pınarhüyüğü where some ceramics and rough stones were found.

== Sources ==
- Ahrweiler, Hélène (1966). "Chôma-Aggélokastron". Revue des études byzantines (in French). 24: 278–283. doi:10.3406/rebyz.1966.1376.
- Kazhdan, Alexander, ed. (1991). The Oxford Dictionary of Byzantium. Oxford and New York: Oxford University Press. ISBN 0-19-504652-8.
