= Angelokastro =

Angelokastro or Angelokastron (Greek: Ἀγγελόκαστρο[ν]) may refer to:

- Angelokastro, Aetolia-Acarnania, a municipality in Greece
- Angelokastro, Corinthia, a settlement in Corinthia
- Angelokastro (Corfu), a Byzantine castle in Corfu, Greece
- Choma (fortress), a Byzantine fortress in Phrygia, also known as Angelokastron after 1193
