= Theodotus of Ancyra =

Theodotus of Ancyra may refer to two separate saints:

- Theodotus of Ancyra (martyr) (fl. 303)
- Theodotus of Ancyra (bishop) (fl. 431–432)
