= Province of the Islands =

Province of the Islands can refer to:

- Provincia Insularum, a late Roman/Byzantine province
- Eyalet of the Archipelago, Ottoman province
