= Samos (theme) =

Province of the Byzantine Empire

Theme of Samos θέμα Σάμου
- Theme of the Byzantine Empire
- before 899 – 1204
- Map of Byzantine Greece c. 900, with the themes and major settlements.
- Historical era: Middle Ages
  - Establishment as a theme: before 899
  - Conversion to regular theme: late 11th century
  - Fourth Crusade: 1204
- Today part of: Greece; Turkey

The Theme of Samos (Greek: θέμα Σάμου, thema Samou) was a Byzantine military-civilian province, located in the eastern Aegean Sea, established in the late 9th century. As one of the Byzantine Empire's three dedicated naval themes (Greek: θέματα ναυτικᾶ, themata nautika), it served chiefly to provide ships and troops for the Byzantine navy.

== Origins ==
The dates of establishment and the territorial reach of the various Byzantine naval commands in the 7th–9th centuries are mostly unclear. After the unitary navy of the Karabisianoi was split up in the early 8th century, regional naval commands were established, of which the naval theme of the Cibyrrhaeots is the first known and most important. Emperor Constantine VII Porphyrogennetos (r. 913–959) records that "at the time the Empire was divided into themes", Samos became the seat of the "theme of the sailors" (Greek: θέμα τῶν πλοϊζομένων, romanized: thema tōn ploïzomenōn); the meaning of this passage is unclear. The historian Warren Treadgold interprets this to mean that Samos was the first seat of the Karabisianoi fleet, until their disbandment c. 727. Alternatively, it could imply a command that formed part of the Karabisianoi and was abolished with them, or a later, short-lived successor, perhaps even identical with the Cibyrrhaeots. The existence of a "strategos of Samos" in the 8th century is attested through a surviving seal of a strategos named Theodore.

In the late 8th century, the southern Aegean appears to have come under the jurisdiction of the "droungarios of the Dodekanesos", (Note: "Dodekanesos" in middle Byzantine times was a term used for the Cyclades, not to be confused with the modern Dodecanese.) whose post some scholars, following Hélène Ahrweiler's suggestion, came to identify with that of the "droungarios of Kos", later appearing as the "droungarios of the Gulf (Kolpos)", as the latter features in the mid-9th century Taktikon Uspensky. This command or at the very least the eastern part of it seems to have evolved into the theme of Samos.

== History ==
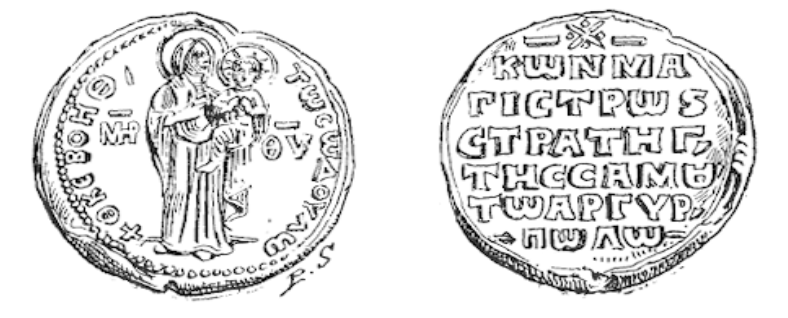
Seal of Constantine Argyropoulos, magistros and strategos of Samos

The theme of Samos, with its governing strategos, is first documented in Philotheos's Kletorologion of 899. It included the islands of the eastern Aegean, as well as the western coast of Asia Minor between Adramyttion and Ephesos (also known as Theologos at the time). The seat of the theme was at Smyrna, while subordinate tourmarchai (vice-admirals) had their seats at Adramyttion and Ephesos.

In 911, the forces of the naval theme of Samos are recorded as being 3,980 oarsmen and 600 marines, with a fleet of 22 warships. The mainland portion of the theme, however, is also explicitly mentioned as belonging to the Thracesian Theme, which had a special tourmarches in charge of defending the coast. This, along with a lack of mention of civil officials attached to the naval theme, most probably reflects a division of tasks: the strategos of Samos and his officials were responsible for furnishing the ships and crews of the thematic fleet as well as defending the islands, while the mainland coast, with its cities and population, came under the control of the Thracesian strategos and his officials, who were responsible for their taxation and defence. Samos seems to have remained a purely military formation until the late 11th century, when its fleet was disbanded and it was converted into a regular theme with its own civil officials.

== Strategoi ==
- Theodore (8th/9th century)
- Constantine Paspalas (c.888)
- Nikephoros (9th/10th century)
- Theodore (10th century)
- Epiphanios (10th century)
- Nicholas (10th century)
- Theognostos (10th century)
- Leo (10th century)
- Theotimos (10th century)
- Romanos Lekapenos (911-912)
- George (10th/11th century)
- Bakur (after 1001- before 1009)
- Basil Argyros (1009-1010)
- David (c.1024)
- George Theodorokanos (before 1026- after 1028)
- Christodoulos (Late 10th/ mid 11th century
- Niketas Xylinites the Younger (1050s)
- Theophylaktos Hagiozacharites (Mid 11th century)
- Michael Tornikes (Early/ Middle 11th century)
- Constantine Argyropolos (Mid/late 11th century)

== Sources ==
- Ahrweiler, Hélène (1966). Byzance et la mer. La marine de guerre, la politique et les institutions maritimes de Byzance aux VIIe-XVe siècles (in French). Paris: Presses universitaires de France.
- Kazhdan, Alexander, ed. (1991). The Oxford Dictionary of Byzantium. Oxford and New York: Oxford University Press. ISBN 0-19-504652-8.
- Nesbitt, John; Oikonomides, Nicolas, eds. (1994). Catalogue of Byzantine Seals at Dumbarton Oaks and in the Fogg Museum of Art, Volume 2: South of the Balkans, the Islands, South of Asia Minor. Vol. 2. Washington, DC: Dumbarton Oaks Research Library and Collection. ISBN 0-88402-226-9.
- Treadgold, Warren T. (1995). Byzantium and Its Army, 284–1081. Stanford, California: Stanford University Press. ISBN 0-8047-3163-2.
