= Marcellus of Ancyra =

Bishop of Ancyra (died c. 374)

Marcellus of Ancyra (Greek: Μάρκελλος Άγκυρας, died c. 374) was a Greek Christian prelate who served as Bishop of Ancyra. He was one of the bishops present at the Synod of Ancyra and the First Council of Nicaea. He was a strong opponent of Arianism, but was accused of adopting the opposite extreme of modified Sabellianism. He was condemned by a council of his enemies and expelled from his see, though he was able to return there to live quietly with a small congregation in the last years of his life. He is also said to have destroyed the temple of Zeus Belos at Apamea.

== Biography ==
A few years after the Council of Nicaea (in 325) Marcellus wrote a book against Asterius the Sophist, a prominent figure in the party which supported Arius. Of this book only fragments survived. Marcellus was accused of maintaining that the Trinity of persons in the Godhead was but a transitory dispensation. According to the surviving fragments, God was originally only one Being (hypostasis), but at the creation of the universe the Word or Logos went out from the Father and was God's Activity in the world. This Logos became incarnate in Christ and thus constituted the Image of God. The Holy Ghost likewise went forth as third Divine Person from the Father and from Christ according to John 20:22. (John 20:22 [NRSV trans.], "he breathed on them and said to them, "Receive the Holy Spirit.") At the consummation of all things, however, Christ would return to the Father and the Godhead would be an absolute unity again. (1 Cor 15:28 [NRSV trans.], "When all things are subjected to him, then the Son himself will also be subjected to the one who put all things in subjection under him, so that God may be all in all.")

The bishops at the First Synod of Tyre in 335 (which also deposed Athanasius) seem to have written to Constantine against Marcellus when he refused to communicate with Arius at Constantine's thirtieth-anniversary celebrations at Jerusalem. Eusebius of Caesarea wrote against him two works: "Contra Marcellum", possibly the prosecution document at Marcellus's trial, and "On the Theology of the Church" or "Ecclesiastical Theology", a refutation of Marcellus's theology from the perspective of Arian theology.

Marcellus was deposed at Constantinople in 336 at a council under the presidency of Eusebius of Nicomedia, the Arian, and Basil of Ancyra appointed to his see. Marcellus sought redress at Rome from Pope Julius I, who wrote to the bishops who had deposed Marcellus, arguing that Marcellus was innocent of the charges brought against him. The Council of Serdica (343) formally examined his book and declared it free of heresy. But he seems not to have been reinstated in his see when Constantius II, threatened by his brother with war, allowed the restoration of Athanasius of Alexandria and Paul of Constantinople to their sees in 345. However, the synod made Marcellus's student Photinus, who later taught a variation of Marcellus's theology, bishop of Sirmium. In 344, the Synod of Antioch excommunicated Marcellus again and drew up the Macrostich, a creed which listed their beliefs and objections to Marcellus's doctrines (among others).

Athanasius's relations with Marcellus were complex, and communion between them was broken off for a time, but at the end of both their lives, Athanasius resisted Basil of Caesarea's attempts to have him generally condemned, and re-established communion with Marcellus. The Second Ecumenical Council condemned 'Marcellians', but not Marcellus himself.

J. W. Hanson (1899) and other Universalist Church of America historians read that Marcellus's theology included a belief in universalism, that all people would eventually be saved. He is quoted by his opponent Eusebius as having said "For what else do the words mean, 'until the times of the restitution' (Acts 3:21), but that the apostle designed to point out that time in which all things partake of that perfect restoration." (Against Marcellus 2:14) However the reference to Acts 3:21 indicates that Eusebius is probably using "restoration" apokatastasis here in the Jewish sense.

Aside from the fragments which survive in Eusebius' Against Marcellus, a letter survives in Epiphanius, Panarion 72.

In his Ecclesiastical History, Sozomen noted that Marcellus, in order to convert the pagans more easily in Apamea, “destroyed the temples of the city and its villages"

== Bibliography ==
=== Books ===
- Sara Parvis, Marcellus of Ancyra And the Lost Years of the Arian Controversy 325-345 (New York: Oxford University Press, 2006)
- Ayres, Lewis, Nicaea and Its Legacy An Approach to Fourth-Century Trinitarian Theology (Oxford: Oxford University Press, 2004).
- Joseph T. Lienhard, Contra Marcellum Marcellus of Ancyra and Fourth-Century Theology. (Washington, D.C.: Catholic University of America Press, 1999), pp. 62–69.
- Robert Hanson. The Search for the Christian Doctrine of God (New York: T&T Clark, 1988), 217–235.

=== Articles ===
- Logan, Alastair H B. 2007. ‘Dark Star: The Rehabilitation of Marcellus of Ancyra Sara Parvis, Marcellus of Ancyra and the Lost Years of the Arian Controversy 325-345’. Expository Times 118, no. 8: 384.
- -------- 1989. ‘Marcellus of Ancyra and anti-Arian Polemic,’ St. Pat XIX (1989), 189–97.
- -------- 1992. ‘Marcellus of Ancyra and the Councils of AD 325: Antioch, Ancyra, and Nicaea,’ JTS NS NS 43, 428–46.
- -------- 2001. ‘Marcellus of Ancyra, Defender of the Faith against Heretics – and Pagans,’ St. Pat XXXVII, 550–64.
- -------- 1999. ‘Marcellus of Ancyra on Origen and Arianism,’ in Origeniana Septima (Leuven: University Press, 1999).
- -------- 2000. ‘Marcellus of Ancyra (Pseudo-Anthimus), “On the Holy Church”: Text, Translation and Commentary,’ JTS NS 51, 81-112.
- Lienhard, Joseph T. 2006. "Two Friends of Athanasius: Marcellus of Ancyra and Apollinaris of Laodicea". Zeitschrift für Antikes Christentum 10, no. 1: 56–66.
