= Agallianos Kontoskeles =

Byzantine military leader

- Ἀγαλλιανός Κοντοσκέλης
- Died: 18 April 727
- Military career
- Allegiance: Byzantine
- Rank: Commander

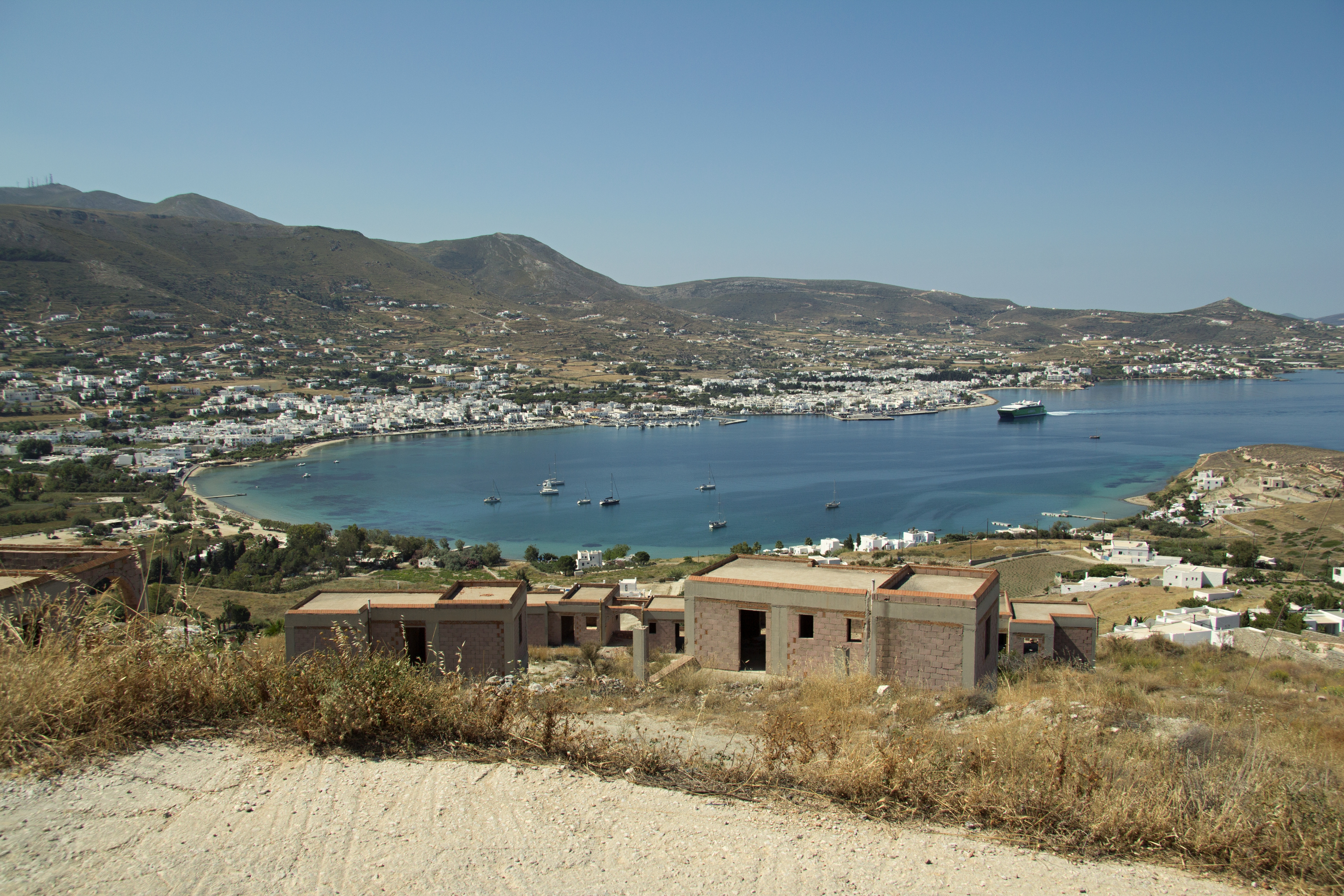
The bay of Parikia, from where the rebel fleet sailed to Constantinople.

Agallianos Kontoskeles (Greek: Ἀγαλλιανός Κοντοσκέλης; died 18 April 727) was a Byzantine military commander and rebel leader.

Agallianos served as tourmarches of the Theme of Hellas in 726/7, when the theme erupted in revolt against Emperor Leo III the Isaurian. Along with Stephen, possibly the commander of the Karabisianoi naval district of the Cyclades, Agallianos became the leader of the revolt, and a certain Kosmas was acclaimed as emperor by the rebels.

However, the rebel fleet was defeated on 18 April 727 by the loyalist navy through the use of Greek fire. Agallianos drowned when he fell from the board of his ship into the sea in full armour, while Stephen and Kosmas were captured and beheaded. On account of his surname "Kontoskeles" ("short-leg"), the Patria of Constantinople erroneously involves him in the construction of the Kontoskalion harbour in Constantinople.

== Sources ==
- Lilie, Ralph-Johannes; Ludwig, Claudia; Pratsch, Thomas; Zielke, Beate (2013). Prosopographie der mittelbyzantinischen Zeit Online. Berlin-Brandenburgische Akademie der Wissenschaften. Nach Vorarbeiten F. Winkelmanns erstellt (in German). Berlin and Boston: De Gruyter.
