= Karabisianoi =

Byzantine naval forces

The Karabisianoi (Medieval Greek Καραβισιάνοι), sometimes anglicized as the Carabisians, were the main forces of the Byzantine navy from the mid-seventh until the early eighth centuries. The name derives from a term for ships (κάραβος, καραβίς; cf. caravel), and means "people of the ships". The Karabisianoi were the first new and permanent naval establishment of the Byzantine Empire, formed to confront the early Muslim conquests at sea. They were disbanded and replaced with a series of maritime themes sometime in 718–730.

== History and role ==
The Karabisianoi were established sometime in the second half of the seventh century in response to the early Muslim conquests. Various scholars have suggested that it evolved from the remainders of the old quaestura exercitus or the Late Roman army of the Praetorian prefecture of Illyricum, but these suggestions remain hypothetical. The date of the fleet's establishment is unclear: some scholars propose that it was established in the 650s or 660s by Emperor Constans II (r. 641–668), following the major naval defeat at the Battle of the Masts in 655, while others think that it was created after the Siege of Constantinople (674–678), where the Arab advance by sea seems to have been almost unopposed.

The first certain reference to the Karabisianoi is during the siege of Thessalonica by the Sclaveni or southern Slavic tribes in c. 680, and then in a letter of Emperor Justinian II (r. 685–695, 705–711) to Pope Conon in 687.

The Karabisianoi are widely held to have been the first permanently maintained naval force of the Byzantine Empire. Before that, as the Mediterranean was a "Roman lake", only a limited number of relatively small warships were maintained in the main harbours and along the fluvial borders of the Empire for patrols and transport tasks. Larger Byzantine fleets were assembled only on an ad hoc basis for specific expeditions.

The Karabisianoi were formed in largely the same way as the land army's themes: they were a distinct military corps named after its soldiers, and headed by a stratēgos (stratēgos tōn karabōn/tōn plōimatōn). Although they are often referred to as the "Carabisian Theme", this designation is erroneous as the Karabisianoi remained a purely military command and do not appear to have constituted a specific territorial division like the land themes.

The stratēgos' base is unknown, with suggestions ranging from Rhodes in the Dodecanese, Keos in the Cyclades, and Samos off the Anatolian coastline.

The Karabisianoi have also been variously seen as an essentially provincial fleet, tasked with defending the southern coast of Anatolia from Miletus to Seleucia in Cilicia, the Aegean islands and the imperial holdings in southern Greece, and serving alongside a central imperial fleet in Constantinople, or a command encompassing virtually the entire effective force of the Byzantine navy and active in both defensive and offensive capacities from the Black Sea to the Exarchate of Africa.

The Karabisianoi were greatly strengthened under Emperor Justinian II, who settled several thousand Mardaites to serve as rowers and marines along the southern coasts of Asia Minor. Justinian also created a separate theme and fleet for southern Greece named "Hellas". The Karabisianoi played a major role in the failed expedition to recover Carthage in 697–698, and led the revolt that installed the admiral Apsimar (Tiberios III) on the throne. The last mention of the stratēgos of the Karabisianoi is in 710/711, and it is not until 732 that his chief successor, the stratēgos of the Cibyrrhaeot Theme, is mentioned.

This has led to two different suggestions as to the date and reason of the disbandment of the Karabisianoi. One view holds that this was after the Second Arab Siege of Constantinople (717–718), either due to poor performance during the previous years or because they assisted in a rebellion against Emperor Leo III the Isaurian (r. 717–741), while the others hold that it happened as late as c. 727 after another unsuccessful revolt in Сyclades against Emperor Leo III.

The Karabisianoi were replaced chiefly by the new Cibyrrhaeot Theme, the first naval theme (thema nautikon), which was a formerly subordinate command under a droungarios and covered the southern coast of Asia Minor. In other coastal provinces, various smaller fleets and squadrons under droungarioi and other officers were tasked with local defence.

== Sources ==
- Ahrweiler, Hélène (1966). Byzance et la mer. La marine de guerre, la politique et les institutions maritimes de Byzance aux VIIe-XVe siècles (in French). Paris: Presses universitaires de France.
- Cosentino, Salvatore (April 2008). "Constans II and the Byzantine Navy". Byzantinische Zeitschrift. 100 (2): 577–603. doi:10.1515/BYZS.2008.577. ISSN 0007-7704.
- Haldon, John (1999). Warfare, State and Society in the Byzantine World, 565–1204. London: UCL Press. ISBN 1-85728-495-X.
- Kazhdan, Alexander, ed. (1991). The Oxford Dictionary of Byzantium. Oxford and New York: Oxford University Press. ISBN 0-19-504652-8.
- Nesbitt, John; Oikonomides, Nicolas, eds. (1994). Catalogue of Byzantine Seals at Dumbarton Oaks and in the Fogg Museum of Art, Volume 2: South of the Balkans, the Islands, South of Asia Minor. Vol. 2. Washington, DC: Dumbarton Oaks Research Library and Collection. ISBN 0-88402-226-9.
- Pryor, John H.; Jeffreys, Elizabeth M. (2006). The Age of the ΔΡΟΜΩΝ: The Byzantine Navy ca. 500–1204. Leiden and Boston: Brill Academic Publishers. ISBN 978-90-04-15197-0.
- Treadgold, Warren (1997). A History of the Byzantine State and Society. Stanford, California: Stanford University Press. ISBN 0-8047-2630-2.
- Whittow, Mark (1996). The Making of Byzantium, 600–1025. Berkeley and Los Angeles, California: University of California Press. ISBN 978-0-520-20496-6.
