= Quaestura exercitus =

Late Roman province

The quaestura exercitus was an administrative district of the Eastern Roman Empire with a seat in Odessus (present-day Varna) established by Emperor Justinian I (r. 527–565) on May 18, 536.

Territorially, the quaestura exercitus contained the Roman provinces of Moesia Inferior and Scythia Minor, located in the lower Danube region, as well as the provinces of Cyprus, Caria, and the Aegean Islands. All of these provinces were detached from the praetorian prefecture of the East and placed under the authority of a new army official known as the quaestor exercitus ('quaestor of the army'). The authority of the quaestor was the equivalent to that of a magister militum.

== History ==
Since the strategically vital Danubian provinces were economically impoverished, the purpose of the quaestura exercitus was to help support the troops that were stationed there. By connecting the exposed provinces of the Lower Danube with wealthier provinces in the interior of the empire, Justinian was able to transport supplies via the Black Sea. This territorial restructuring relieved both the destitute populations and the devastated countryside of the Danubian provinces from the burden of sustaining any stationed troops. There is a lack of subsequent evidence on the history of the quaestura exercitus. However, since the position of quaestor was still extant during the mid-570s, this indicates that the overall territorial unit achieved a modicum of success.

Ultimately, the Danubian provinces associated with the quaestura exercitus did not survive the Avar invasions in the sixth and seventh centuries. However, isolated fortresses on the Danube Delta and along the coast of the Black Sea were maintained via supplies by sea. Charles Diehl first raised the suggestion that the great naval corps of the Karabisianoi, which appears in the 680s, was first formed by the remainders of the quaestura. This argument has been adopted by some scholars since but challenged by others, notably Helene Ahrweiler in her study of the Byzantine navy. This question is bound up with the discussion on the respective formations' nature as military-naval or civil-administrative entities.

Lead seals from Moesia Inferior and Scythia Minor provide archaeological evidence supporting the existence of the quaestura exercitus. Specifically, thirteen seals, nine of which are from the reign of Justinian, demonstrate that communications between officials from Scythia Minor and Constantinople occurred on a somewhat regular basis.

== Sources ==
- Brubaker, Leslie; Haldon, John (2011). Byzantium in the Iconoclast Era, c. 680-850: A History. Cambridge University Press. ISBN 978-0-5214-3093-7.
- Curta, Florin (2001). The Making of the Slavs: History and Archaeology of the Lower Danube Region, c. 500–700. Cambridge: Cambridge University Press.
- Gkoutzioukostas, Αndreas E; Moniaros, Xenofon Μ. (2009). Η περιφερειακή διοικητική αναδιοργάνωση της βυζαντινής αυτοκρατορίας από τον Ιουστινιανό Α´ (527-565): η περίπτωση της quaestura Iustiniana exercitus [The Regional Administrative Reorganization of the Byzantine Empire by Justinian I (527-565): The Case of the Quaestura Iustiniana Exercitus] (in Greek). Thessaloniki: Vanias. ISBN 978-960-288-250-4.
- Haldon, John (1999). Warfare, State and Society in the Byzantine World, 565–1204. London: UCL Press. ISBN 1-85728-495-X.
- Maas, Michael (2005). The Cambridge Companion to the Age of Justinian. Cambridge: Cambridge University Press. ISBN 0-521-81746-3.
- Velkov, Velizar Iv. (1977). Cities in Thrace and Dacia in Late Antiquity: (Studies and Materials). Amsterdam, the Netherlands: A. M. Hakkert.
- Zuckerman, Constantin (2005). "Learning from the Enemy and More. Studies in 'Dark Centuries' Byzantium". Millennium. 2. Berlin and New York: Walter de Gruyter: 79–135. ISBN 978-3-11-018254-5.
