= Cibyrrhaeot Theme =

Province of the Byzantine Empire

Theme of the Cibyrrhaeots Κιβυρραιῶται, θέμα Κιβυρραιωτῶν
- Theme of the Byzantine Empire
- ca. 720/727–after 1150
- The Asian themes of the Byzantine Empire circa 842. The Cibyrrhaeots encompassed the southern shore of Asia Minor.
- Capital: Attaleia
- Historical era: Middle Ages
  - Established: ca. 720/727
  - Abolition by Manuel I: after 1150
- Today part of: Greece; Turkey

The Cibyrrhaeot Theme, more properly the Theme of the Cibyrrhaeots (Greek: θέμα Κιβυρραιωτῶν, romanized: thema Kibyrrhaiōtōn), was a Byzantine theme encompassing the southern coast of Asia Minor from the early 8th to the late 12th centuries. As the Byzantine Empire's first and most important naval theme (θέμα ναυτικόν, thema nautikon), it served chiefly to provide ships and troops for the Byzantine navy.

== History ==
The Cibyrrhaeots (Ancient Greek: Κιβυρραιῶται, romanized: Kibyrrhaiōtai, lit. 'men of Cibyrrha') derive their name from the city of Cibyrrha (it is unclear whether this is Cibyrrha the Great in Caria or Cibyrrha the Lesser in Pamphylia). The command first appears in the expedition against Carthage in 698, when a "droungarios of the Cibyrrhaeots" is attested as commanding the men from Korykos: Apsimar, who at the head of a fleet revolt became emperor as Tiberios III (r. 698–705). At the time, the Cibyrrhaeots were subordinate to the great naval corps of the Karabisianoi.

After the Karabisianoi were disbanded (the exact date is disputed between c. 719/720 and c. 727), the Cibyrrhaeots were constituted as a regular theme, with its governing strategos first attested in 731/732. Until the 9th century, when the themes of the Aegean Sea and Samos were elevated from droungarios-level commands, the Cibyrrhaeot Theme was the only dedicated naval theme of the Empire.

The theme encompassed the southern coast of Asia Minor (modern Turkey), from south of Miletus (which belonged to the Thracesian Theme) to the confines of the Arab borderlands in Cilicia, including the old Roman provinces of Caria, Lycia, Pamphylia and parts of Isauria, as well as the modern Dodecanese. Its geographical position made it the "front-line" theme facing the attacks of the Muslim fleets of the Levant and Egypt, and consequently the Cibyrrhaeots played a major role in the naval aspect of the Byzantine–Arab Wars. The land, which was known for its fertility, suffered from the frequent and devastating Arab raids, which largely depopulated the countryside except for the fortified cities and naval bases.

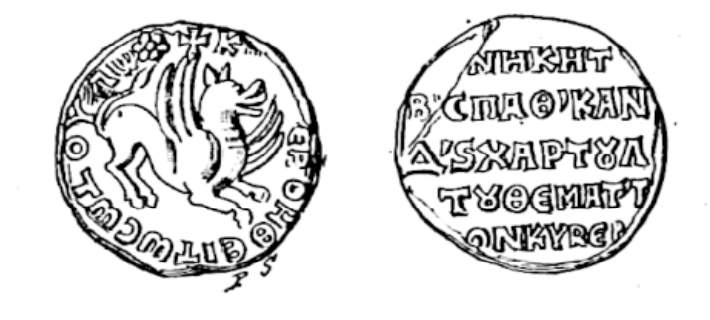
10th/11th-century seal of Niketas, spatharokandidatos and chartoularios of the Cibyrrhaeots

The seat of the strategos was most probably Attaleia. He drew an annual salary of 10 pounds of gold, and his overall rank in the imperial hierarchy was relatively low, but still senior to any other naval commander: twenty-fifth in the Taktikon Uspensky of 842/843, dropping to fifty-fifth in the Escorial Taktikon of 971–975. Like its other counterparts, the Cibyrrhaeot Theme was divided into droungoi and tourmai, and possessed the full array of typical thematic administrative positions. Among the most important subordinates of the strategos were the imperial ek prosopou at Syllaion, the droungarioi of Attaleia and Kos and the katepano who commanded the theme's Mardaites. These were the descendants of several thousand people transplanted from the area of Lebanon and settled there by Emperor Justinian II (r. 685–695, 705–711) in the 680s to provide crews and marines for the fleet. In the early 9th century, the thematic fleet of the Cibyrrhaeots comprised 70 ships; and in the Cretan expedition of 911, the Cibyrrhaeot theme sent 31 warships – 15 large dromons and 16 middle-sized pamphyloi – with 6,000 oarsmen and 760 marines.

Around the mid-11th century, as the Muslim naval threat subsided, the Byzantine provincial fleets began a precipitate decline: the fleet of the Cibyrrhaeots is last mentioned in the repulsion of a Rus' raid in 1043, and the theme became a purely civil province, headed by a krites and later by a doux. Most of its territory was lost to the Seljuk Turks after the 1071 Battle of Manzikert, but recovered under Alexios I Komnenos (r. 1081–1118). The rump theme was finally abolished by Manuel I Komnenos (r. 1143–1180), and the territory in Caria subordinated to the theme Mylasa and Melanoudion.

== Sources ==
- Ahrweiler, Hélène (1966). Byzance et la mer. La marine de guerre, la politique et les institutions maritimes de Byzance aux VIIe-XVe siècles (in French). Paris: Presses universitaires de France.
- Kazhdan, Alexander, ed. (1991). The Oxford Dictionary of Byzantium. Oxford and New York: Oxford University Press. ISBN 0-19-504652-8.
- Nesbitt, John; Oikonomides, Nicolas, eds. (1994). Catalogue of Byzantine Seals at Dumbarton Oaks and in the Fogg Museum of Art, Volume 2: South of the Balkans, the Islands, South of Asia Minor. Washington, DC: Dumbarton Oaks Research Library and Collection. ISBN 0-88402-226-9.
- Pertusi, A. (1952). Constantino Porfirogenito: De Thematibus (in Italian). Rome: Biblioteca Apostolica Vaticana.
- Pryor, John H.; Jeffreys, Elizabeth M. (2006). The Age of the ΔΡΟΜΩΝ: The Byzantine Navy ca. 500–1204. Leiden and Boston: Brill Academic Publishers. ISBN 978-90-04-15197-0.
