= Gümüşsu, Çivril =

Village in Turkey

Gümüşsu
- Neighbourhood
- Location in Turkey Gümüşsu (Turkey Aegean)
- Coordinates: 38°14′20″N 29°59′13″E
- Country: Turkey
- Province: Denizli
- District: Çivril
- Population (2022): 1,229
- Time zone: UTC+3 (TRT)

Gümüşsu is a neighbourhood of the municipality and district of Çivril, Denizli Province, Turkey. Its population is 1,229 (2022). Before the 2013 reorganisation, it was a town (belde). Gümüşsu was formerly called Homa, and the ruins of the medieval fortress of Choma are located at Akkale, 4 km to the north on Akdağ mountain.
