= Basil of Ancyra =

Galatian Christian priest and saint (died 362)

Saint Basil of Ancyra
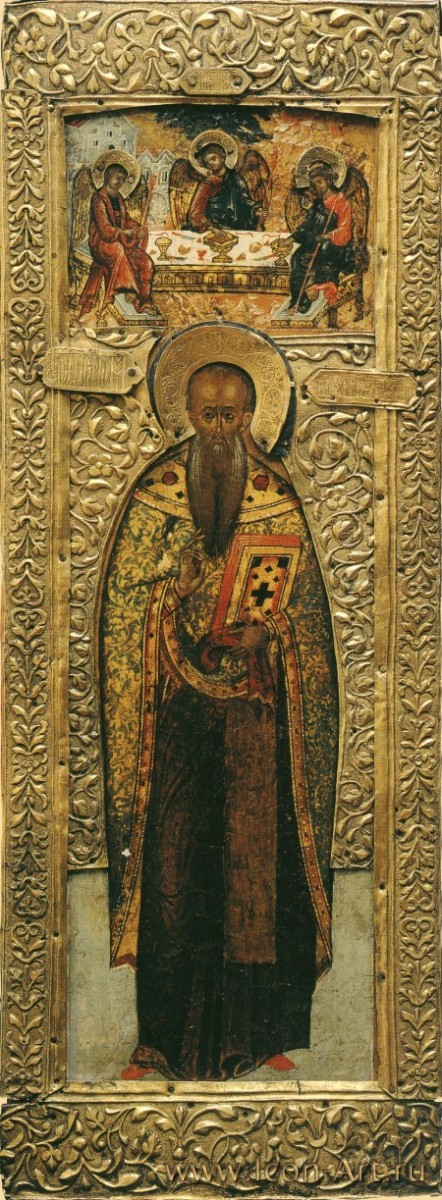

Hieromartyr
- Residence: Ancyra, Roman Empire (modern-day Ankara, Turkey)
- Died: 29 June, 362
- Venerated in: Eastern Orthodox Church; Roman Catholic Church
- Feast: 22 March

Saint Basil of Ancyra (Greek: Βασίλειος), was a Christian priest and saint in Ancyra, Galatia during the 4th century. Very little information about his life is preserved in a metaphrastic work: “Life and Deeds of the Martyred Priest Basil.” He fought against the teachings of the pagans and the Arians. Basil defended Bishop Marcellus against the prelate being deposed by the Arians.

Suda write that he was the bishop of Ancyra and a physician by trade.

Basil was caught up in the persecution of Julian the Apostate. He was arrested, tortured, and executed on June 28 or June 29, 362.

== Veneration ==
He is commemorated as a martyr on March 22 in the West and East. He is sometimes confused with the other Basil of Ancyra who was not a priest and who is commemorated on January 1.

== See also ==
- Photinus
- Panarion
