= Droungos =

Llate Roman and Byzantine military unit

Droungos (Greek: δροῦγγος, sometimes δρόγγος, drongos) or drungus is a late Roman and Byzantine term for a battalion-sized military unit, and later for a local command guarding mountain districts. Its commander was a "droungarios" or "drungarius" (δρουγγάριος), anglicized as "Drungary".

== History and functions ==
The term drungus is first attested in Latin in the late 4th century AD. It derives from Gaulish *dhrungho (see Old Irish drong; Old Breton drogn or drog), meaning "tribe", "group", "throng" or "crowd". An alternative Germanic etymology (thrunga) cited by some historians, originates in 17th-century guesswork which has been rejected by the overwhelming majority of philologists. The earliest usage of drungus in Latin is non-technical and similarly signifies a generic "band" or "troop", which Vegetius equates to Latin globus.

The term first occurs in Greek as droungos (δροῦγγος) or drongos (δρόγγος), with the same meaning, in the early 5th century. In the late 6th century, the Emperor Maurice (r. 582–602) applies droungos to a specific tactical deployment, usually of cavalry, characterised as a compact non-linear grouping suited to outflanking tactics, ambushes and irregular operations. He is the first author to employ the cognate adverb droungisti (Greek: δρουγγιστί), with the sense of "in group formation" or "small-group tactics". Maurice also occasionally employs droungos as a generic expression for larger "groupings" or "formations" of troops, though in this sense he refers only to a "division" (meros) and never to a "brigade" (moira) with which droungos became associated in later sources.

By the middle of the 7th century, this meaning had been superseded by a new meaning, which it held until the 11th century. The droungos, alternatively known as a moira (μοίρα), was now formalized as a regular subdivision of a tourma, the chief subdivision of the new themata (θέματα, singular: θέμα). In turn, each droungos was composed of several banda (singular: bandon). Thus each moira or droungos was the analogue of a modern regiment or brigade, initially circa 1000 men strong (and hence also referred to as a chiliarchia). On occasion, it could rise to 3000 men, and Emperor Leo VI the Wise (r. 886–912) is recorded as having established droungoi of only 400 men for the new smaller themes created during his reign.

From the late 12th century onwards, the term droungos was applied to mountainous areas in Greece, and was associated with the meaning of "pass" or "mountain range" (zygos). In the 13th century, it also came to designate the military units detailed to guard these locations, similar to the earlier kleisourai.

== Sources ==
- Kazhdan, Alexander Petrovich, ed. (1991). Oxford Dictionary of Byzantium. New York, New York and Oxford, United Kingdom: Oxford University Press. ISBN 978-0-19-504652-6.
- Rance, Philip (2004). "Drungus, Δροῦγγος and Δρουγγιστί – A Gallicism and Continuity in Roman Cavalry Tactics". Phoenix. 58: 96–130. doi:10.2307/4135199. JSTOR 4135199.
- Treadgold, Warren T. (1995). Byzantium and Its Army, 284–1081. Stanford, California: Stanford University Press. ISBN 0-8047-3163-2.
