= Hypertimos =

Ecclesiastical title in Eastern Orthodox churches

Hypertimos (Greek: ὑπέρτιμος, "most honorable one") is an ecclesiastical title in the Eastern Orthodox churches following the Greek liturgical tradition, used to designate metropolitan bishops.

The title originated in the 11th-century Byzantine Empire, where the philosopher Michael Psellos held this title at the end of his illustrious career; and in the chrysobull to the Venetians of 1082, the title was also conferred on the Patriarch of Grado.
