= Kleisoura (Byzantine district) =

Byzantine military frontier province

In the Byzantine Empire, a kleisoura (Greek: κλεισούρα, "enclosure, defile") was a term traditionally applied to a fortified mountain pass and the military district protecting it. By the late 7th century, it came to be applied to more extensive frontier districts, distinct from the larger themata, chiefly along the Empire's eastern border with the Caliphate along the line of the Taurus-Anti-Taurus mountains (in the West, only Strymon was in its early days termed a kleisoura). A kleisoura or kleisourarchia was an autonomous command, under a kleisourarches (Greek: κλεισουράρχης). Eventually, most kleisourai were raised to full themata, and the term fell out of use after the 10th century (in late Byzantine times, droungos had a similar meaning). Its Islamic counterpart in Cilicia and Mesopotamia was the al-thughūr.

== See also ==
- Digenes Akritas
- Karbeas

== Sources ==
- Glykatzi-Ahrweiler, Hélène (1960). "Recherches sur l'administration de l'empire byzantin aux IX-XIème siècles". Bulletin de Correspondance Hellénique (in French). 84 (1): 1–111. doi:10.3406/bch.1960.1551.
- Kazhdan, Alexander Petrovich, ed. (1991). The Oxford Dictionary of Byzantium. New York, New York and Oxford, United Kingdom: Oxford University Press. ISBN 978-0-19-504652-6.
