= Islands (Roman province) =

Roman province

The Province of the Islands (Latin: Provincia Insularum; Greek: ἐπαρχία νήσων, romanized: eparchia nēsōn) was a Late Roman province consisting of most of the islands in the Aegean, now part of Greece. It was succeeded by later Byzantine theme of Aegean Sea. It should not be confused with the Roman province of Hispania Balearica, which consists of the (now Spanish) Balearic Islands.

== History ==
In Late Antiquity, the province was part of the Diocese of Asia of the Praetorian prefecture of the East, until subordinated to the quaestura exercitus by Emperor Justinian I.

Rhodes was the capital of the province, whose governor had the modest rank of praeses (hegemon in Greek). It encompassed many Aegean islands. According to the Synecdemus of Hierocles, the province included twenty cities: Rhodes, Amorgos, Andros, Astypalaia, Chios, Ios, Kos, Melos, Methymna, Mytilene, Naxos, Paros, Petelos, Proselene, Samos, Siphnos, Tenedos, Tenos and Thera.

Rhodes' homonymous capital was also the see of the metropolitan archbishopric of the ecclesiastical province covering the Cyclades, with eleven suffragan sees including Astypalaia, Ios and in the Dodekanesos Nisyrus (Nisyros island).
