= Euagina =

Town of ancient Cappadocia, inhabited during Roman and Byzantine times

Coordinates: 38°31′19″N 36°00′43″E

Euagina, also known as Sebagena and Eudagina, was a town of ancient Cappadocia, inhabited during Roman and Byzantine times.

Its site is located near Gemerek, Asiatic Turkey.
