= Moira (military) =

Moira (Greek: μοῖρα, pronounced míra, plural μοῖραι) is a Greek term for a military formation. Etymologically, it is derived from the roots *μερ- and *μορ-, which mean "to part". Moira therefore means "a part, a division", and is cognate with the similar term meros. In the Byzantine period, it was used to denote brigade or division-sized commands, while in the modern Greek military, it is used by some branches to designate battalion-sized units.

== Byzantine usage ==
In the late 6th to early 7th century, the Late Roman military system, which was still in use by the East Roman or Byzantine Empire, went through a process of martial transformations that culminated with the establishment of the new military-administrative theme system in the 680s. Every major division, called a thema (Greek: θέμα), was further divided into tourmai while each tourma was divided into moirai or droungoi, which in turn were composed of several banda. Thus each moira or droungos was the analogue of a modern regiment or brigade, initially circa 1000 men strong (and hence also referred to as a chiliarchia), although on occasion it could rise to 3000 men, and Emperor Leo VI the Wise (r. 886–912) is recorded as having established droungoi of only 400 men for the new smaller themes.

== Modern Greek usage ==
In the Hellenic Air Force, but also in the Aviation services of both Army and Navy, moira (Greek: μοίρα, plural μοίρες) is the term used for squadrons. Likewise, the Hellenic Navy uses the term for a squadron of ships. In the Hellenic Army in addition, the term is used to designate Artillery battalions and Special Operation Forces battalion-sized squadrons (Raider and Paratrooper Squadrons).

== Sources ==
- Treadgold, Warren T. (1995). Byzantium and Its Army, 284–1081. Stanford, California: Stanford University Press. ISBN 0-8047-3163-2.
