= Droungarios =

Byzantine military rank

A droungarios, also spelled drungarios (Greek: δρουγγάριος, Latin: drungarius) and sometimes anglicized as Drungary, was a military rank of the late Roman and Byzantine empires, signifying the commander of a formation known as droungos.

== Late Roman and Byzantine army ==
Latin-speakers adopted the word drungus - first attested in the early 4th century - either from Gaulish or from a Germanic language. In the late 6th century, the Emperor Maurice (r. 582–602) in his Strategikon used droungos to refer to a specific tactical deployment, usually of cavalry, although still in the general sense of "grouping, division".

The term droungarios (Greek: δρουγγάριος) is not documented before the early 7th century but might have been used as an informal or unofficial designation before that date. The office and the corresponding unit appear to have initially referred to ad hoc arrangements, but during the early 7th century these were formalized, like much of the Eastern Roman army's rank structure.

In the new military-administrative theme system, every major division, called a thema (Greek: θέμα), was further divided into tourmai. Each tourma was divided into moirai (Greek: μοίραι) or droungoi. Which in turn were composed of several banda. Thus each moira or droungos was the analogue of a modern regiment or brigade, initially circa 1000 men strong (and hence also referred to as a chiliarchia), although on occasion it could rise to 3000 men. Emperor Leo VI the Wise (r. 886–912) is recorded as having established droungoi of only 400 men for the new smaller themes.

The rank of droungarios was one of the lowest military ranks that carried an accompanying court title, ranging from hypatos to vestētōr.

=== Droungarios of the Watch ===
The commander of the elite Vigla regiment (one of the tagmata) bore the rank of droungarios tēs viglēs (δρουγγάριος τῆς βίγλης). The first mention of this office occurs in 791. The Vigla regiment was responsible for guarding the Byzantine emperor on campaign. The close proximity to the Byzantine emperor made the office extremely important, and in the 10th and 11th centuries it was held by a number of leading aristocratic families.

After circa 1030, this office also assumed significant judicial responsibilities, since its holder became the president of the imperial court of the Vēlon, housed at the "Covered Hippodrome" adjoining the imperial palace, in which capacity it survived until the end of the Byzantine Empire. The prefix megas ("grand") was added to the title, reflecting the fact that in the Komnenian period, its holders, men like Andronikos Kamateros, were among the Byzantine emperor's senior aides.

== Byzantine navy ==
The rank of droungarios was also used in the Byzantine navy to designate its admirals. The droungarios tou [basilikou] ploïmou (δρουγγάριος τοῦ [βασιλικοῦ] πλοΐμου) was the commander of the central Imperial Fleet, based at and around Constantinople.

The provincial ("thematic") fleets were also commanded by a droungarios (although it was later replaced by the more exalted rank of strategos), to whose title was added the name of the thema under his command, e.g. droungarios tōn Kibyrrhaiōtōn (δρουγγάριος τῶν Κιβυρραιωτῶν, one of the subordinate admirals of the Cibyrrhaeot Theme). The position of the droungarios tou ploïmou first occurs in the so-called Taktikon Uspensky of circa 842, and the exact date of its establishment is unclear.

The droungarios of the Imperial Fleet was raised to the rank of megas droungarios [tou stolou] ("Grand Drungary [of the Fleet]") in the 11th century, acting as commander-in-chief of the entire Byzantine navy, until he was replaced in this task by the megas doux in the 1090s. The office of megas droungarios of the fleet continued to exist, in a subordinate position, until the fall of the Byzantine Empire. The variant rank of droungarokomēs (Greek: δρουγγαροκόμης) also existed, signifying a count (komēs) in command of a squadron of warships.

== See also ==
- Byzantine aristocracy and bureaucracy

== Sources ==
- Bartusis, Mark C. (1997). The Late Byzantine Army: Arms and Society 1204–1453. Philadelphia, Pennsylvania: University of Pennsylvania Press. ISBN 0-8122-1620-2.
- Bury, John Bagnell (1911). The Imperial Administrative System of the Ninth Century - With a Revised Text of the Kletorologion of Philotheos. London: Oxford University Press.
- Haldon, John (1999). Warfare, State and Society in the Byzantine World, 565–1204. London: UCL Press. ISBN 1-85728-495-X.
- Kazhdan, Alexander, ed. (1991). The Oxford Dictionary of Byzantium. Oxford and New York: Oxford University Press. ISBN 0-19-504652-8.
- Magdalino, Paul (2002) [1993]. The Empire of Manuel I Komnenos, 1143–1180. Cambridge: Cambridge University Press. ISBN 0-521-52653-1.
- Rance, Philip (2004). "Drungus, Δροῦγγος and Δρουγγιστί – A Gallicism and Continuity in Roman Cavalry Tactics". Phoenix. 58: 96–130. doi:10.2307/4135199. JSTOR 4135199.
- Treadgold, Warren T. (1995). Byzantium and Its Army, 284–1081. Stanford, California: Stanford University Press. ISBN 0-8047-3163-2.
