= Hélène Ahrweiler =

Greek Byzantinologist (1926–2026)

Hélène Ahrweiler FBA
- Ελένη Γλύκατζη-Αρβελέρ
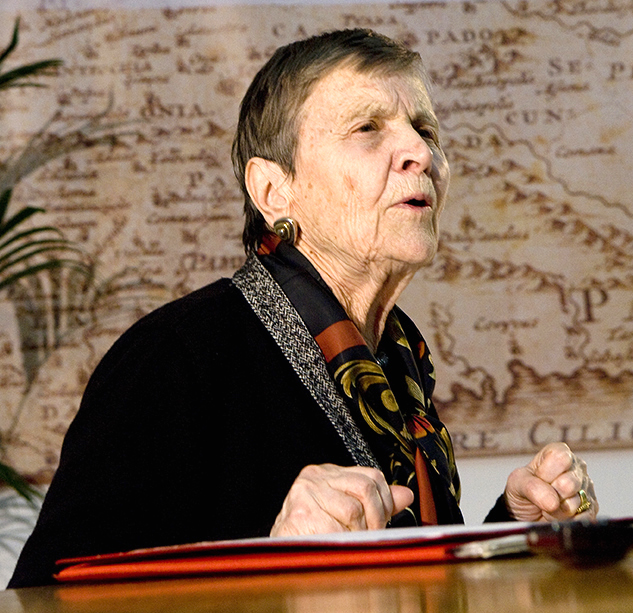
- Ahrweiler in 2010
- Born: Eleni Glykatzi; 29 August 1926; Athens, Greece
- Died: 16 February 2026 (aged 99); Athens, Greece
- Other name: Hélène Glykatzi-Ahrweiler
- Spouse: Jacques Ahrweiler (m. 1958; died 2010)

Academic background
- Education: University of Athens; EPHE; University of Paris

Academic work
- Institutions: CNRS; University of Paris 1

Hélène Glykatzi-Ahrweiler (French: [elɛn aʁvɛlɛʁ]; Greek: Ελένη Γλύκατζη-Αρβελέρ; 29 August 1926 – 16 February 2026) was a Greek-French academic Byzantinologist. She was also a UNICEF Goodwill Ambassador for Greece.

== Life and career ==
Eleni Glykatzi was born in Athens on 29 August 1926, to a family of Greek refugees from Bursa, the Istanbul hinterlands. She grew in the region of Vyronas. She graduated from high school in Athens and studied history and archaeology at the School of Philosophy of the University of Athens. During the Axis occupation of Greece she was a member of EPON. She moved to Paris in 1953 to continue her studies in the École pratique des hautes études (EPHE) where she obtained her doctorates in History and Classics. In 1955, she started working as a researcher in the French National Centre for Scientific Research (CNRS), and on 7 November 1958, she married the French Army officer Jacques Ahrweiler (1918–2010). In 1960, she completed her PhD in History from the University of Paris (Sorbonne). In 1964, she became the director of the CNRS, and two years later, in 1966, she completed her second PhD in Philology. She became a professor at the Sorbonne in 1967.

By becoming Deputy Principal from 1970 to 1973 and then Principal of the University of Paris 1 Panthéon-Sorbonne from 1976 to 1981, Glykatzi-Ahrweiler became the first woman to hold this position in the 700-year history of the Sorbonne, and the first woman in the world to serve as the head of a world-renowned university.

In 1982, French President François Mitterrand named her as Rector of the Academy of Paris and Chancellor of the Universities of Paris, a post she held until 1989. From February 1989 to August 1991, she was president of the Centre Georges Pompidou. She was also the Principal at the University of Europe in Paris, President of the Ethics Committee of the National Centre of Scientific Research in France, President of the European Cultural Centre of Delphi in Greece, and Honorary President of the International Committee of Byzantine Studies. French president Jacques Chirac offered her the Medal of the Battalion Commander of the Legion of Honor (one of the highest awards of the French Republic), thus honoring her scientific work and directorship in various French universities as well as at the Centre Georges Pompidou in Paris. In 2007, she received the title of Honorary Doctor of the Media Studies Department of the Aristotle University of Thessaloniki.

Ahrweiler died on 16 February 2026, at the age of 99.

== Honours ==
Ahrweiler was a corresponding member of the British Academy, the Academy of Athens, the Berlin-Brandenburg Academy of Sciences and Humanities, the Bulgarian Academy of Sciences, and an associated member of the Royal Academy of Belgium. She held a number of honorary doctorates, and received numerous decorations from the French government:

- Commander of the Légion d'honneur
- Commander of the Ordre national du Mérite
- Commander of the Ordre des Palmes académiques
- Commander of the Ordre des Arts et des Lettres

Some of the titles she received included: Brigadier of the Legion of Honor in Greece, Golden Cross of the Legion and Brigade of Honor, Golden Cross of the National Brigade of Values, Brigadier of Arts and Education, Golden Cross of the Brigade of the Academic Phoenix, Citizen Medal (France), Highest Brigadier (Mexico), Brigadier of the Brigade of Eagle (Iceland), Brigadier of the National Brigade (Luxemburg), Higher Brigadier of the Brigade of Values (Austria), Brigadier of the Royal Brigade Dannerog (Denmark), Brigadier of Science, Education and Art (Portugal), Brigadier of the Brigade of Values (Italy), honorary medal of the Polish Science Academy and Member of the Order of the International Olympic Committee.

== Publications ==
- Byzance et la mer, 1966
- Études sur les structures administratives et sociales de Byzance, 1971
- L'Idéologie politique de l'empire byzantin, 1975
- Byzance : les pays et les territoires, 1976
- The Making of Europe, 1999
- Les Européens, 2000
- Le Roman d'Athènes, 2004

== Sources ==
- Short Biography at Strabon.org
- Cox-Fill, Olivia (1996). "Hélène Ahrweiler". For our daughters: how outstanding women worldwide have balanced home and career. Greenwood Publishing Group. pp. 193–199. ISBN 978-0-275-95199-3.
