= Turma =

Cavalry unit of Ancient Rome and the Byzantine Empire

A turma (from Latin 'swarm, squadron'; plural turmae; Greek: τούρμα) was a cavalry unit in the Roman army of the Republic and Empire. In the Byzantine Empire, it became applied to the larger, regiment-sized military-administrative divisions of a thema. The word is often translated as "squadron" but so is the term ala, a unit that was made up of several turmae.

== Roman army ==
=== Republic ===
In the 3rd and 2nd centuries BC, the time of the Punic Wars and Rome's expansion into Spain and Greece, the core of the Roman army was formed by citizens, augmented by contingents from Rome's allies (socii). The organization of the Roman legion of the period is described by the Greek historian Polybius (cf. the so-called "Polybian army"), who writes that each 4,200-strong infantry legion was accompanied by 300 citizen cavalry (equites). This contingent was divided into ten turmae. According to Polybius, the squadron members would elect as their officers three decuriones ("leaders of 10 men"), of whom the first to be chosen would act as the squadron's commander and the other two as his deputies. As in earlier times, these men were drawn from among the 18 centuriae of the equestrian order, the wealthiest classes of the Roman people, who could afford to provide for the horse and its equipment themselves.

=== Empire ===
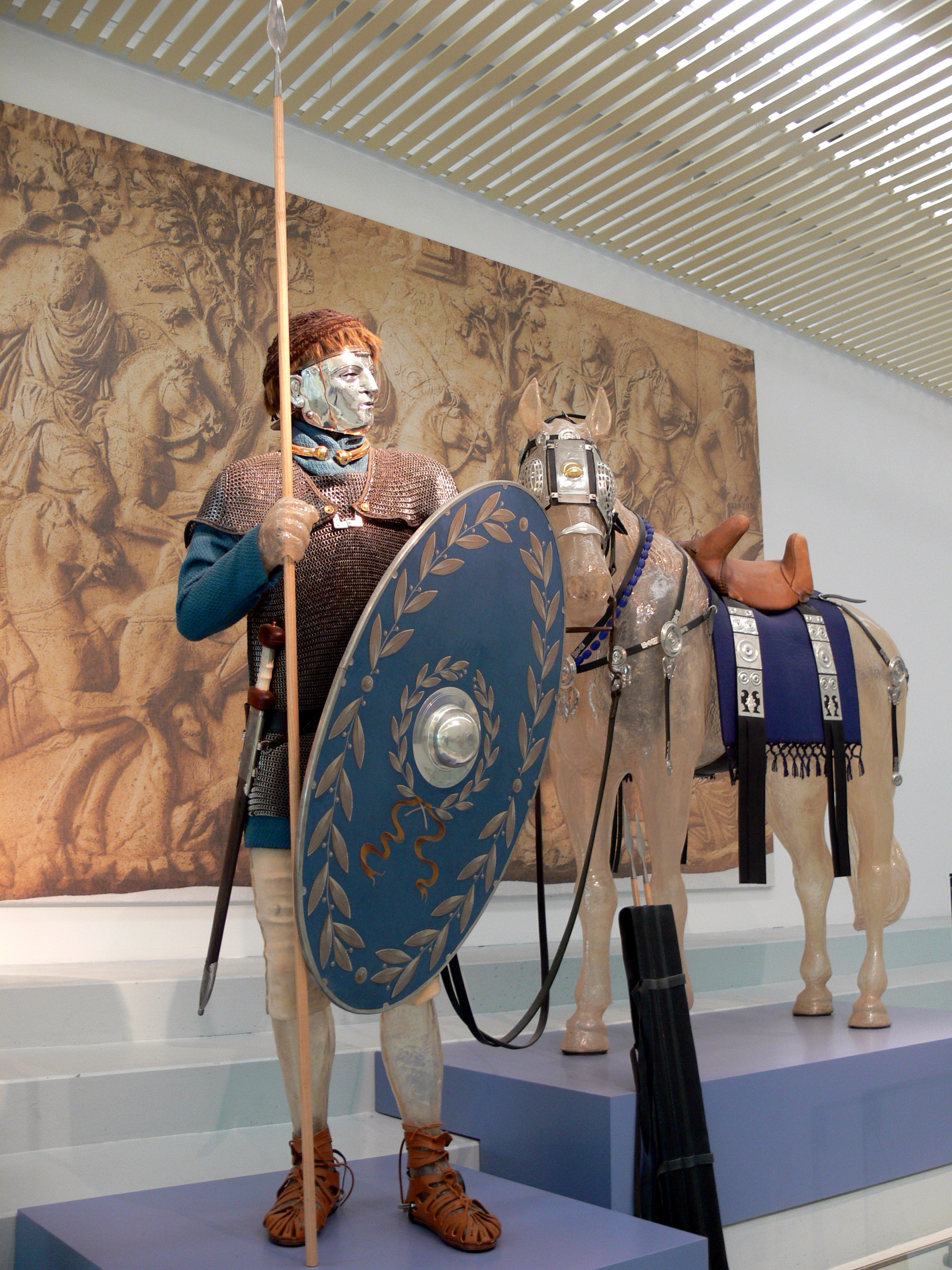
Reconstruction of a Roman cavalryman of the Principate, Nijmegen

With the reorganization of the army under Emperor Augustus (r. 27 BC – 14 AD) and his successors, the turma became the basic sub-unit of the cavalry, the rough equivalent of the infantry centuria, both in the auxiliaries, who formed the bulk of the Roman cavalry, and in the legionary cavalry detachments. The auxiliary cohors equitata was a mixed unit combining infantry and cavalry, and existed in two types: the cohors equitata quingenaria, with an infantry cohort of 480 men and 4 turmae of cavalry, and the reinforced cohors equitata milliaria, with 800 infantry and 8 turmae. Likewise, the purely cavalry alae contained either 16 (ala quingenaria) or 24 turmae (ala milliaria). Individual turmae of camel-riders (dromedarii) also appear among cohortes equitatae in the Middle East, and Emperor Trajan (r. 98–117) established the first all-camel cavalry unit, the Ala I Ulpia dromedariorum Palmyrenorum.

The turma was still commanded by a decurio, aided by two subaltern principales (under-officers), a sesquiplicarius (soldier with one-and-a-half times pay) and a duplicarius (soldier with double pay), as well as a signifer or vexillarius (a standard-bearer, cf. vexillum). These ranks corresponded respectively with the infantry's tesserarius (officer of the watch), optio, and signifer. The exact size of the turma under the Principate, however, is unclear: 30 men was the norm in the Republican army and apparently in the cohortes equitatae, but not for the alae. The De Munitionibus Castrorum, for instance, records that a cohors equitata milliaria numbered exactly 240 troopers, i.e. 30 men per turma, but also gives the number of horses for the ala milliaria, composed of 24 turmae, at 1000. If one subtracts the extra horses of the officers (two for a decurio, one for each of the two subaltern under-officers), one is left with 832 horses, which does not divide evenly with 24. At the same time, Arrian explicitly says that the ala quingenaria counted 512 men, suggesting a size of 32 men for each turma.

As for the legions, during the Principate, each had a cavalry contingent organized in four turmae. A legionary turma was led by a centurion, assisted by an optio and a vexillarius as senior principales. Each of them led a file of ten troopers, for a grand total of 132 horsemen in each legion. Their status was distinctly inferior to that of the legionary infantry: the centurions and principales of the legionary turmae were classed as supernumerarii and although their men were included in the legionary cohort lists, they camped separately from them.

In the late Roman army, the turma and its structure were retained, with changes in titulature only: the turma was still headed by a decurio, who also led the first ten-strong file, while the other two files were led by subaltern catafractarii, in essence the successors of the early Empire's duplicarii and sesquiplicarii. Traces of this structure also apparently survived in the 6th-century East Roman army: in the late-6th-century Strategikon of Maurice, the cavalry files are led by a dekarchos (Greek: δέκαρχος, "leader of ten").

== Byzantine Empire ==
In the 7th century, as a result of the crisis caused by the early Muslim conquests, the Byzantine military and administrative system was reformed: the old late Roman division between military and civil administration was abandoned, and the remains of the East Roman army's field armies were settled in great districts, the themata, that were named after them. The term turma, in its Greek transcription tourma (τούρμα or τοῦρμα), reappears at that time as the major subdivision of a thema. The army of each thema (except for the Optimatoi) was divided into two to four tourmai, and each tourma further into a number of moirai (μοίραι) or droungoi (δροῦγγοι), which in turn were composed of several banda (singular: bandon, βάνδον, from Latin: bandum, "banner").

This division was carried through to the territorial administration of each thema: tourmai and banda (but not the moirai/droungoi) were identified with clearly defined districts which served as their garrison and recruitment areas. In his Taktika, Emperor Leo VI the Wise (r. 886–912) presents an idealized thema as consisting of three tourmai, each divided into three droungoi, etc. This picture, however, is misleading, as the sources do not support any degree of uniformity in size or number of subdivisions in the different themata, nor indeed an exact correspondence of the territorial with the tactical divisions: depending on the tactical exigencies, smaller administrative tourmai could be joined on campaign and larger ones broken up. Since the elementary unit, the bandon, could itself number between 200 and 400 men, the tourma too could reach up to 6000 men, although 2–5000 seems to have been the norm between the seventh and early tenth centuries.

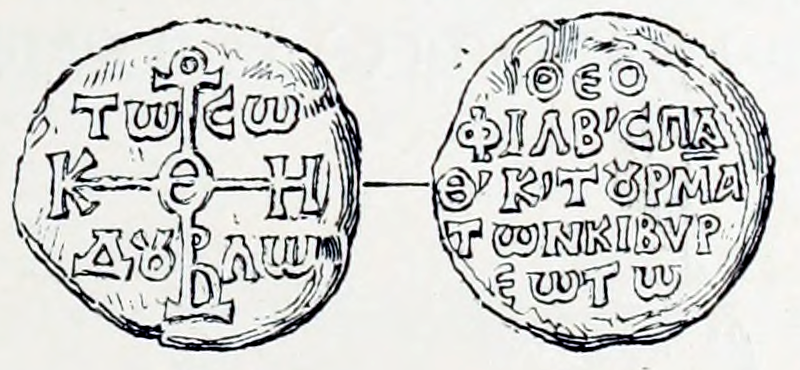
Seal of Theophilos, basilikos spatharios and tourmarchēs of the Cibyrrhaeots

Each tourma was usually headed by a tourmarchēs (τουρμάρχης, "commander of a tourma"). In some cases, however, an ek prosōpou, a temporary representative of the governing stratēgos of each thema, could be appointed instead. The title first appears in circa 626, when a certain George was tourmarchēs of the Armeniac Theme. The tourmarchēs was usually based in a fortress town. Aside from his military responsibilities, he exercised fiscal and judicial duties in the area under his control. In the lists of offices (taktika) and seals, tourmarchai usually hold the ranks of spatharokandidatos, spatharios or kandidatos. In function and rank, the tourmarchēs corresponded with the topotērētēs of the professional imperial tagmata regiments. The tourmarchai were paid according to the importance of their thema: those of the more prestigious Anatolian themes received 216 gold nomismata annually, while those of the European themes received 144 nomismata, the same amount paid to the droungarioi and the other senior officers of the thema. In some sources, the earlier term merarchēs (μεράρχης, "commander of a meros, division"), which occupied a similar hierarchical position in the 6th–7th centuries, is used interchangeably with tourmarchēs. In the 9th–10th centuries, it is often found in the variant form meriarchēs (μεριάρχης). It has, however, also been suggested by scholars like J. B. Bury and John Haldon that the latter was a distinct post, held by the tourmarchēs attached to the governing stratēgos of each thema and residing at the thematic capital.

In the mid-10th century, the average size of most units fell. In the case of the tourma, it dropped from 2–3000 men to 1000 men and less, in essence to the level of the earlier droungos, although larger tourmai are still recorded. It is probably no coincidence that the term "droungos" disappears from use at around that time. Consequently, the tourma was divided directly into five to seven banda, each of 50–100 cavalry or 200–400 infantry. The term tourma itself fell gradually into disuse in the 11th century, but survived at least until the end of the 12th century as an administrative term. Tourmarchai are still attested in the first half of the 11th century, but the title seems to have fallen out of use thereafter.

== General and cited references ==
- Bury, John Bagnell (1911). The Imperial Administrative System of the Ninth Century - With a Revised Text of the Kletorologion of Philotheos. London: Oxford University Press.
- Erdkamp, Paul, ed. (2007). A Companion to the Roman Army. Malden, Massachusetts: Blackwell Publishing Limited. ISBN 978-1-4051-2153-8.
- Goldsworthy, Adrian (2003). The Complete Roman Army. London, United Kingdom: Thames & Hudson Limited. ISBN 0-500-05124-0.
- Haldon, John (1999). Warfare, State and Society in the Byzantine World, 565–1204. London: UCL Press. ISBN 1-85728-495-X.
- Kazhdan, Alexander, ed. (1991). The Oxford Dictionary of Byzantium. Oxford and New York: Oxford University Press. ISBN 0-19-504652-8.
- Sabin, Philip; van Wees, Hans; Whitby, Michael, eds. (2007). The Cambridge History of Greek and Roman Warfare, Volume 2: Rome from the Late Republic to the Late Empire. Cambridge, United Kingdom and New York, New York: Cambridge University Press. ISBN 978-0-521-78274-6.
- Treadgold, Warren T. (1995). Byzantium and Its Army, 284–1081. Stanford, California: Stanford University Press. ISBN 0-8047-3163-2.
