= Bandon (Byzantine Empire) =

Military and territorial unit of Byzantine Empire

The bandon (Greek: βάνδον) was the basic military unit and administrative territorial entity of the middle Byzantine Empire. Its name, like the Latin bandus and bandum ("ensign, banner"), had a Germanic origin. It derived from the Gothic bandwō, which is proof of foreign influence in the army at the time this type of unit evolved.

== Origin ==
The term was used already in the 6th century, mentioned by Procopius, as a term for a battle standard, and soon came to be applied to the unit bearing such a standard itself. From the reign of Nikephoros I (802–811) it was the name for a subdistrict of the Byzantine thema.

== Organization ==
In the Byzantine army of the 8th to the 11th centuries CE, the bandon formed the basic unit, with five to seven banda forming a tourma, the major subdivision of a thema, a combined military-civilian province. Each bandon was commanded by a komes ("count"), with infantry banda 200 to 400 strong and cavalry banda 50 to 100 strong. It is considered that the bandon in the Tactica (9th century) previously in the Strategikon (6th century) was alternatively written as tagma or arithmos.

Infantry banda were formed by sixteen lochagiai, each with sixteen man, commanded by an officer lochagos (file leader), which was assisted by dekarchos (leader of ten), pentarchos (leader of five), tetrarchos (leader of four), and ouragos (file closer). Each four lochagiai formed an allagion (winglet), and around three-quarters of the men were spearmen skutatoi and one-quarter were archers toxotai. At the time the Strategikon was written, the cavalry banda were subdivided into three hekatontarchia, each commanded by a hekatontarchos with a senior second-in-command illarches.

By the reign of Leo VI the Wise (886–912), the hekatontarchia disappeared and the bandon was divided into six allagia (probably commanded by pentekontarchai), and each pair was still commanded by a hekatontarchos or kentarchos. Each of six allagia had fifty men, organized in five dekarchiai of ten men each. All four officers (dekarchos, pentarchos, tetrarchos, ouragos) were lancers.

== Late empire ==
At the beginning of the 10th century the infantry unit consisted of 256 men (16x16), and cavalry unit of 300 men (6x50), but the manuals indicate that the unit strength in fact varied between 200 and 400 men. The work Praecepta Militaria by Nikephoros II Phokas (963–969) indicates that the cavalry bandon was only 50 strong. Unlike other middle Byzantine administrative and military terms, the bandon survived well into the late Byzantine period, and remained the basic territorial unit of the Empire of Trebizond until its fall.

== Sources ==
- Heath, Ian (1979). Byzantine Armies 886-1118. Men-at-Arms. Illustrated by Angus McBride. Osprey Publishing. pp. 4–6. ISBN 9780850453065.
- Kazhdan, Alexander, ed. (1991). "Bandon". The Oxford Dictionary of Byzantium. Oxford University Press. p. 250. ISBN 978-0-19-504652-6.
- Heath, Ian (1995). Byzantine Armies AD 1118-1461. Men-at-Arms. Illustrated by Angus McBride. Osprey Publishing. p. 13. ISBN 9781855323476.
- Bali, Tomislav (2013), "Review of Paul Stephenson, ur., The Byzantine World", Historical Journal (in Croatian), 66 (2), Croatian Historical Society: 462
