= Dry stone hut =

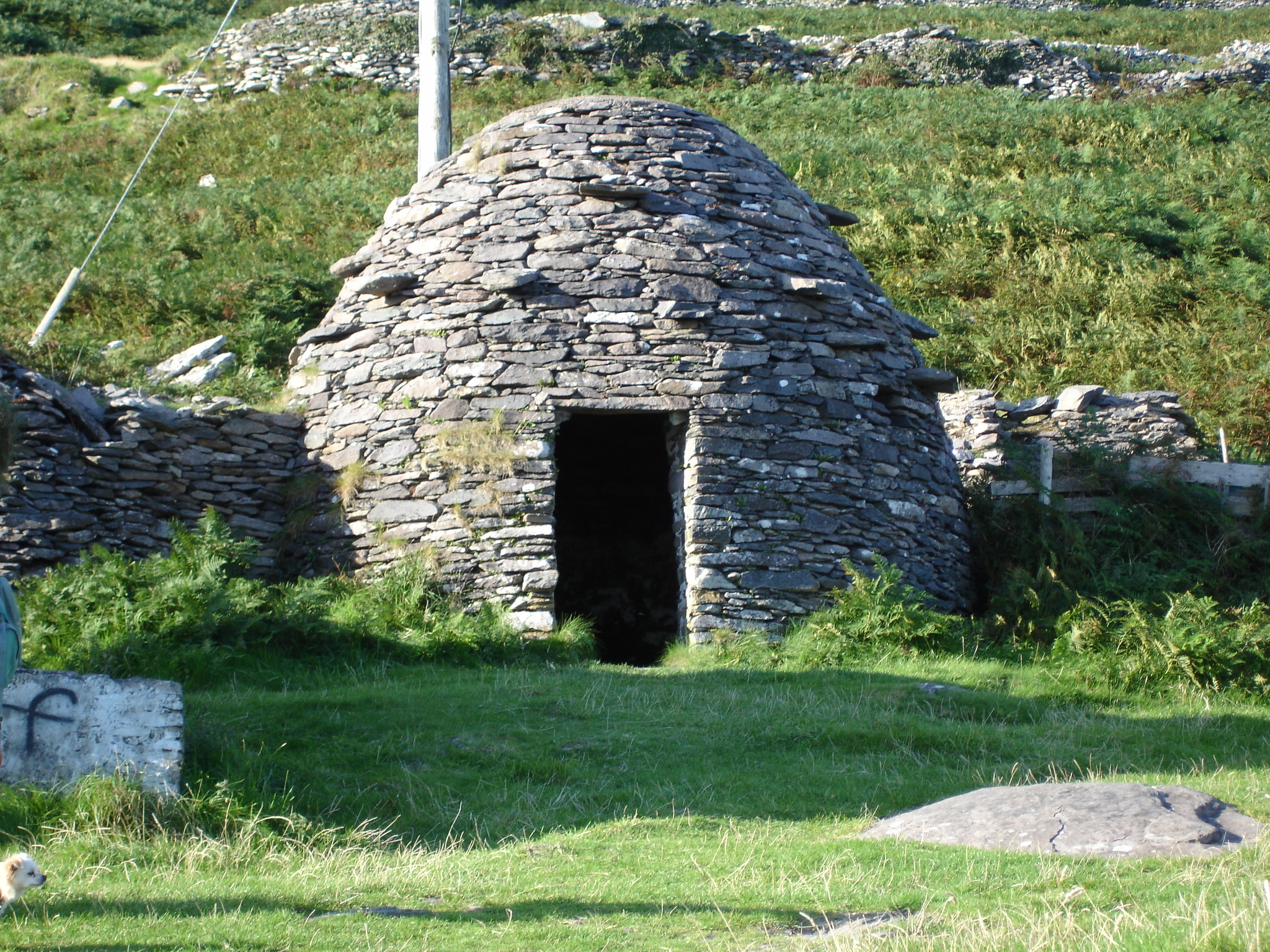
A clochán on Dingle Peninsula, Kerry, Ireland

Types of dry stone hut include:

- Clochán, associated with the south-western Irish seaboard
- Mitato, found in Greece, especially on the mountains of Crete
- Orri, associated with Ariège, France
- Shielings in Scotland
- Trulli, in Apulia, Italy
- Bunja, kažun, trim in Croatia
- Stone-made roundavel in Sotho culture

Uses of dry-stone huts include temporary shelter for shepherds and their animals, permanent habitations for monks or agricultural workers, storage and cheese making. Dry-stone huts may be thatched or roofed with sod, sometimes bound together with plant roots such as those of Madonna lily or sedum.

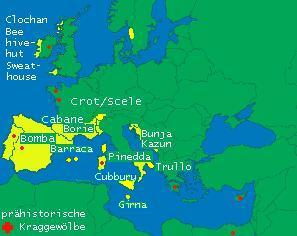
Distribution in Europe
