= Justinianopolis =

Justinianopolis (Greek: Ἰουστινιανούπολις, romanized: Ioustinianoupolis) may refer to several cities named after Justinian I or Justinian II:

Europe

- Justinianopolis in Cyprus, a former name of Salamis, Cyprus
- Justinianopolis (Epirus), a town of ancient Epirus, now in Albania
- Justinianopolis in Macedonia, a former name of Kastoria, Greece
- Justinianopolis (Thrace), a town of ancient Thrace, near modern Istanbul

Asia

- Justinianopolis in Armenia, a former name of Erzincan, Turkey
- Justinianopolis in Bithynia, a former name of Günüören, Turkey
- Justinianopolis in Cappadocia, a former name of Kırşehir, Turkey
- Justinianopolis in Caria, a former name of Didim, Turkey
- Justinianopolis in Cilicia, a former name of Anavarza, Turkey
- Justinianopolis in Galatia, a former name of Sivrihisar, Turkey
- Justinianopolis in Phoenicia, a former name of Huwwarin, Syria
- Justinianopolis in Phrygia, a former name of Pepuza, Turkey
- Justinianopolis in Pisidia, a later name of Conana, now in Turkey
- Justinianopolis in Syria, a former name of Burqush, Syria

Africa

- Justinianopolis in Africa, a former name of Sousse, Tunisia
- Justinianopolis in Africa, a former name of Chebba, Tunisia
- Justinianopolis in Egypt, a former name of Qift, Egypt

== See also ==
- Justiniana
