= Aplekton =

Aplekton (Greek: ἄπληκτον, from Latin: applicatum) was a Byzantine term used in the 10th–14th centuries for a fortified army base (in this sense similar to the metaton) and later in the Palaiologan period for the obligation of billeting soldiers.

== History and functions ==
The institution of the aplekta as major assembly areas, where stores of supplies were kept and where the provincial armies of the themata were to join the main imperial force for a campaign, date most probably to the reign of Emperor Constantine V (r. 741–775). Of these, the camp of Malagina in Bithynia was the nearest to the capital of Constantinople, and is mentioned as early as 786/787. Other such bases existed in Anatolia. Emperor Basil I (r. 867–886) mentions Kaborkin, Koloneia and Kaisareia, while Bathys Ryax was to be used for expeditions against the Paulicians. His successor, Emperor Constantine VII Porphyrogennetos (r. 945–959), in his treatise on imperial expeditions, records the aplekta from west to east as follows: Malagina, Dorylaion, Kaborkin, Koloneia, Kaisareia and Dazimon. Further such camps are in evidence from literary sources at Kepoi (at the mouths of the Maeander river) and at Phygela, at Diabasis in Thrace, as well as the large encampments at Hebdomon near Constantinople, and at Adrianople.

The Komnenian emperors, harder pressed and lacking in strategic depth, continued this system, and added camps (no longer termed aplekta, but fulfilling the same role) at Gounaria in Paphlagonia, at Chrysopolis in Bithynia, Pelagonia in western Macedonia, Serdica (modern Sofia), Kypsella in Thrace (near the Maritsa river), and at Lopadion on the Rhyndacus river in western Anatolia. Advance camps for expeditions against the Seljuk Turks were established by Emperor Manuel I Komnenos (r. 1143–1180) at Dorylaion and Soublaion.

== Sources ==
- Bartusis, Mark C. (1997). The Late Byzantine Army: Arms and Society 1204–1453. Philadelphia, Pennsylvania: University of Pennsylvania Press. ISBN 0-8122-1620-2.
- Birkenmeier, John W. (2002). The Development of the Komnenian Army: 1081-1180. Boston, Massachusetts: Brill. ISBN 90-04-11710-5.
- Haldon, John F., ed. (1990). Constantine Porphyrogenitus: Three Treatises on Imperial Military Expeditions. Vienna: Verlag der Österreichischen Akademie der Wissenschaften. ISBN 3-7001-1778-7.
- Haldon, John F. (1997). "The Organisation and Support of an Expeditionary Force: Manpower and Logistics in the Middle Byzantine Period". In Oikonomides, Nicolas (ed.). Το εμπόλεμο Βυζάντιο, 9ος-12ος αι. – Byzantium at War. Athens: National Hellenic Research Foundation. pp. 111–151. Archived from the original on 2012-02-29.
- Haldon, John (1999). Warfare, State and Society in the Byzantine World, 565–1204. London: UCL Press. ISBN 1-85728-495-X.
- Kazhdan, Alexander, ed. (1991). The Oxford Dictionary of Byzantium. Oxford and New York: Oxford University Press. ISBN 0-19-504652-8.
