= Justinianopolis Nova =

Justinianopolis Nova may refer to:

- Justinianopolis Nova (Bithynia)
- Justinianopolis Nova (Cappadocia)
