= Jamesway (disambiguation) =

Jamesway is a defunct department store chain.

Jamesway or james way may also refer to:

- Jamesway hut
- James Way
