= Malagina =

Byzantine army assembly place and fortress

Coordinates: 40.5253°N 30.1014°E

Malagina (Greek: Μαλάγινα), in later times Melangeia (Μελάγγεια), was a Byzantine district in the valley of the Sangarius river in northern Bithynia, at least overlapping the modern territory of Pamukova.

== History ==
Malagina served as a major encampment and fortified staging area (aplekton) for the Byzantine army. It was the aplekton closest to the imperial capital of Constantinople, and, as such, of major importance during imperial expeditions to the East: it was here that the armies of the powerful themes of Anatolikon, Opsikion and Thrakesion joined the emperor. The region was also the site of the major imperial horse ranches (metata) in Asia Minor. It is first mentioned in historical sources in 798, when Empress Irene assembled an army there. Other sources state that the first mention of Malagina is in a text attributed to St. Methodius, dating from the late seventh century. The site was attacked by the Arabs in 798, 860 and in ca. 875. The city was sacked by the Turks in the early 12th century.

In 1145, Emperor Manuel I Komnenos rebuilt the city, restored the fortifications of the district's main fortress at Metabole after a Turkish raid, and used it as a base for his campaigns against the Seljuk Sultanate of Iconium. Spolia from nearby Hellenistic walls served to build the facade of this castle that could oversee the whole valley. Under the Angeloi, it became a separate province, headed by a governor titled dux and stratopedarches. At the same time, it is attested as being an archbishopric, before being raised to a metropolis under the Laskarids.

The last reference of Malagina as a Byzantine dominion dates to 1302, when emir Ali asked for permission to set his soldiers at Mesonesos. The castle of Malagina had fallen into disuse, since the Ottomans, who had settled in the mountains east of Malagina, advanced gradually towards the south to the Byzantine territory along the Sangarius. Malagina was conquered by the Ottomans in 1306.

== Location ==
Although there were difficulties in precising the location of Malagina, it was facilitated by the discovery of the ruins of Metabole in 1982, by the British archeologist Clive Foss. They stood on a high and steep hill, at an elevation of 754 m, just north of the village of Paşalar, in the district of Pamukova.

The place has been also identified with the town of Mela by W.M. Ramsay.

== Sources ==
- Foss, Clive (1990), "Byzantine Malagina and the Lower Sangarius", Anatolian Studies, 40, British Institute at Ankara: 161–183, doi:10.2307/3642800, JSTOR 3642800, S2CID 191380626
- Haldon, John (1999). Warfare, State and Society in the Byzantine World, 565–1204. London: UCL Press. ISBN 1-85728-495-X.
- Kazhdan, Alexander, ed. (1991). The Oxford Dictionary of Byzantium. Oxford and New York: Oxford University Press. ISBN 0-19-504652-8.
