= Wadi al-Qarn =

Wadi al-Qarn could refer to the following:

- Wadi al-Qarn (Nahal Kziv) — A perennial stream in northern Israel
- Wadi al-Qarn – Burqush Important Bird Area, a bird area in southwestern Syria
