= Engelmannsreuth =

Village in Upper Franconia, Germany

Coordinates: 49°48′46″N 11°38′42″E

Engelmannsreuth is a small village in Upper Franconia in Bavaria, Germany. It has approximately 600 inhabitants.

== History ==
The first official mention of Engelmannsreuth was in 1119, but it is known that the surrounding area was first settled a thousand years ago by fishermen and hunters. The village itself appears to have been founded sometime between 1000-1050. According to local legend, construction of the first building in Engelmannsreuth was ordered by one Lord Dietrich of Bierfurt, who wished to have a rock hut near a freshwater spring for use during his hunting trips. The hut still stands today and is the oldest building in the village.

The area was then given to an ally of Lord Dietrich named Engilmar, who erected more houses, expanded the Rittersteig path to the castrum crusni (German: Altencreußen) into a small road, and created more fields. "Engelmannsreuth" is derived from his name.
