= Justiniana =

Justiniana (Ancient Greek: Ιουστινιανή, romanized: Ioustiniane) may refer to:

- Justiniana Prima, a former Byzantine city, near modern Lebane, in Serbia
- Justiniana Secunda, a former Byzantine city, near modern Lipljan, in Kosovo
- Archbishopric of Justiniana Prima, a primatial church province, created in 535

== See also ==
- Justiniana Nova (disambiguation)
- Justinianopolis (disambiguation)
