= Justiniana Nova =

Justiniana Nova or Nova Justiniana (Ancient Greek: Νέα Ἰουστινιανή, lit. 'New city of Justinian') may refer to one of several sites named after Justinian I or Justinian II:

- Dara (Mesopotamia), renamed after Justinian I rebuilt it
- Erdek, renamed after the settlement of Cypriot refugees there by Justinian II

== See also ==
- Justinianopolis (disambiguation)
- Justiniana (disambiguation)
