= Hut =

Dwelling

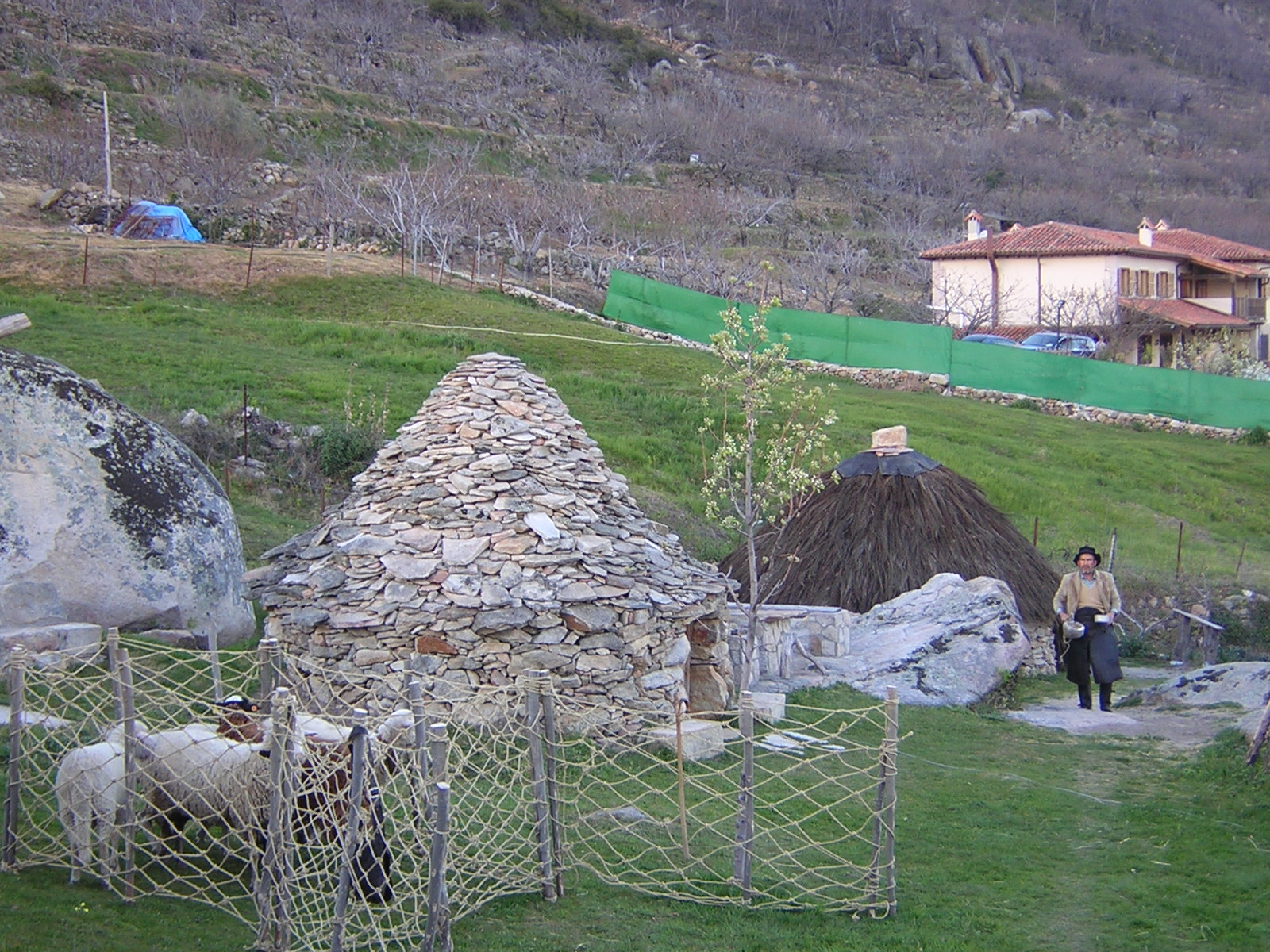
Chozos (Spanish: 'huts') in western Spain

A hut or hovel is a small dwelling, which may be constructed of various local materials. Huts are a type of vernacular (non-academic) architecture, being built of readily available materials like mud.

== Etymology ==
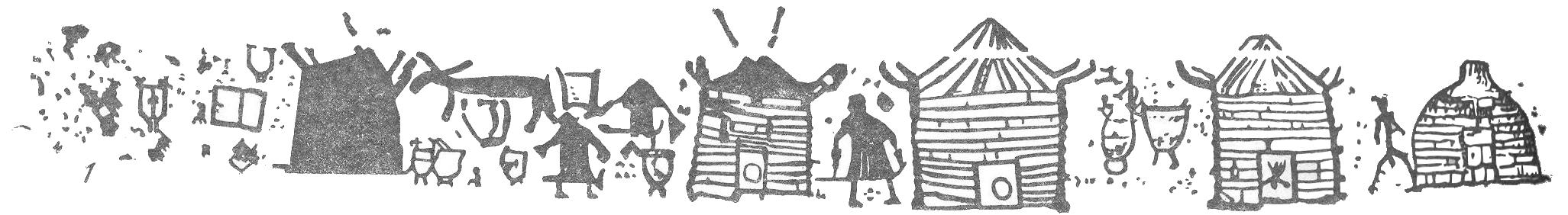
Drawings of petroglyphs from the Tagar culture, 1st millennium BC in Krasnoyarsk Krai, Russia

The word originally referred to a quickly built and temporary small shack. It was apparently first used in English as a military word in the 1650s, from the French hutte ('cottage'), from the Middle High German hütte ('cottage, hut'), probably from Proto-Germanic *hudjon-, related to the root of Old English hydan ('to hide'), from Proto-Indo-European *keudh-, from root (s)keu- ('to cover'). Other variations include Old Saxon hutta, Danish hytte, Swedish hytta, West Frisian and Middle Dutch hutte, Dutch hut perhaps from High German.

The Ukrainian khata seems to be known from even earlier ages, including Avestan or ancient Iranian origins.

== Overview ==
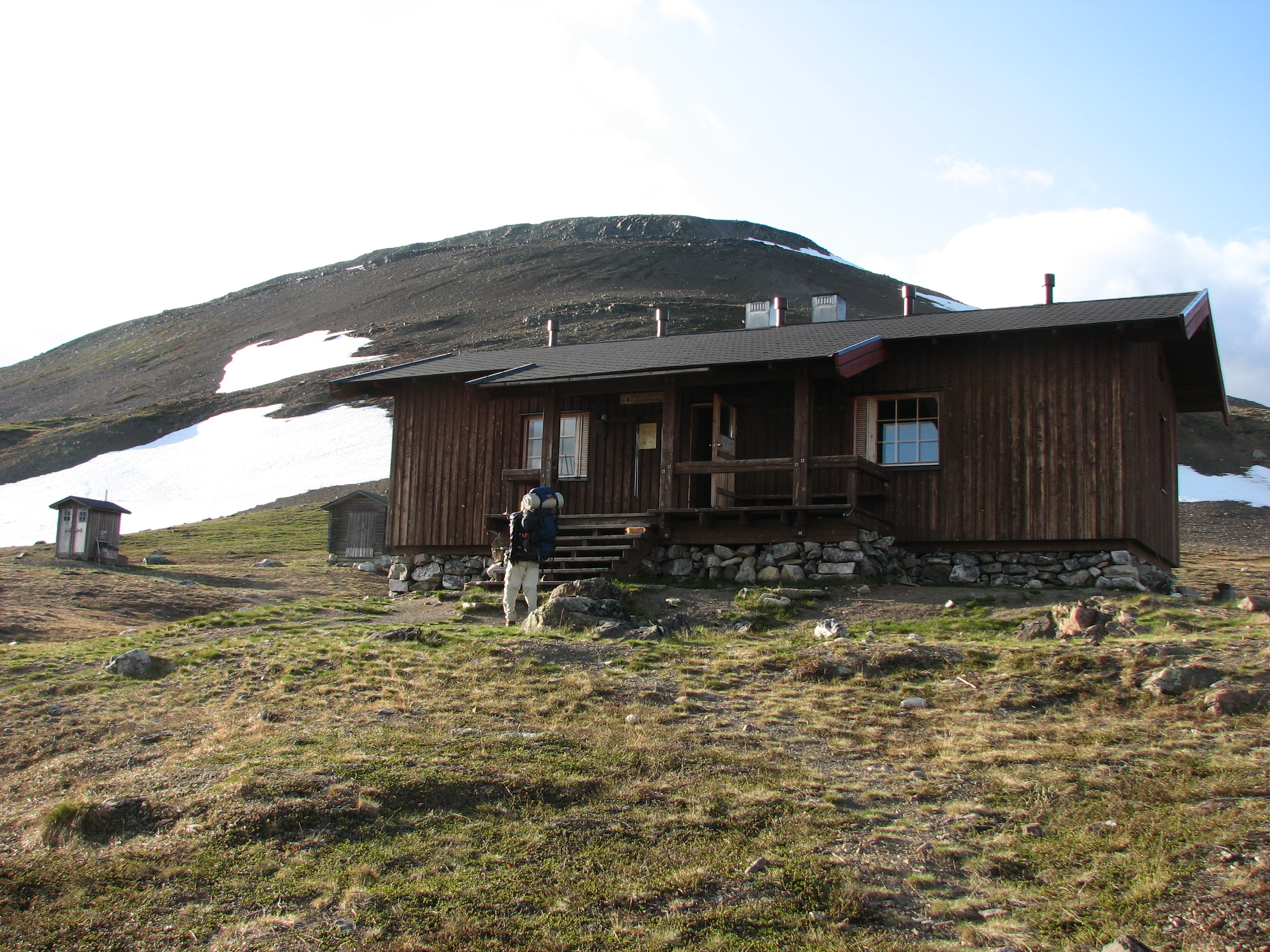
A mountain hut in northern Finland

The construction of a hut is generally less complex than that of a house (durable, well-built dwelling) but more so than that of a shelter (place of refuge or safety) such as a tent and is used as temporary or seasonal shelter or as a permanent dwelling in some indigenous societies. Additionally, the word hut is often used in the Western world for a wooden shed.

== Uses ==
Huts are used as dwellings, for storage, workshops, and teaching.

For the last few hundred years, the shepherd's hut has been used as a mobile multi-purpose home, sheltering shepherds as they move with their flocks.

Some displaced populations of people use huts throughout the world during a diaspora. For example, temporary collectors in the wilderness agricultural workers at plantations in the Amazon jungle.

The term has been adopted by climbers and backpackers to refer to a more solid and permanent structure offering refuge. These vary from simple bothies – which are little more than very basic shelters – to mountain huts that can be more luxurious, e.g. including multiple rooms and facilities such as restaurants.

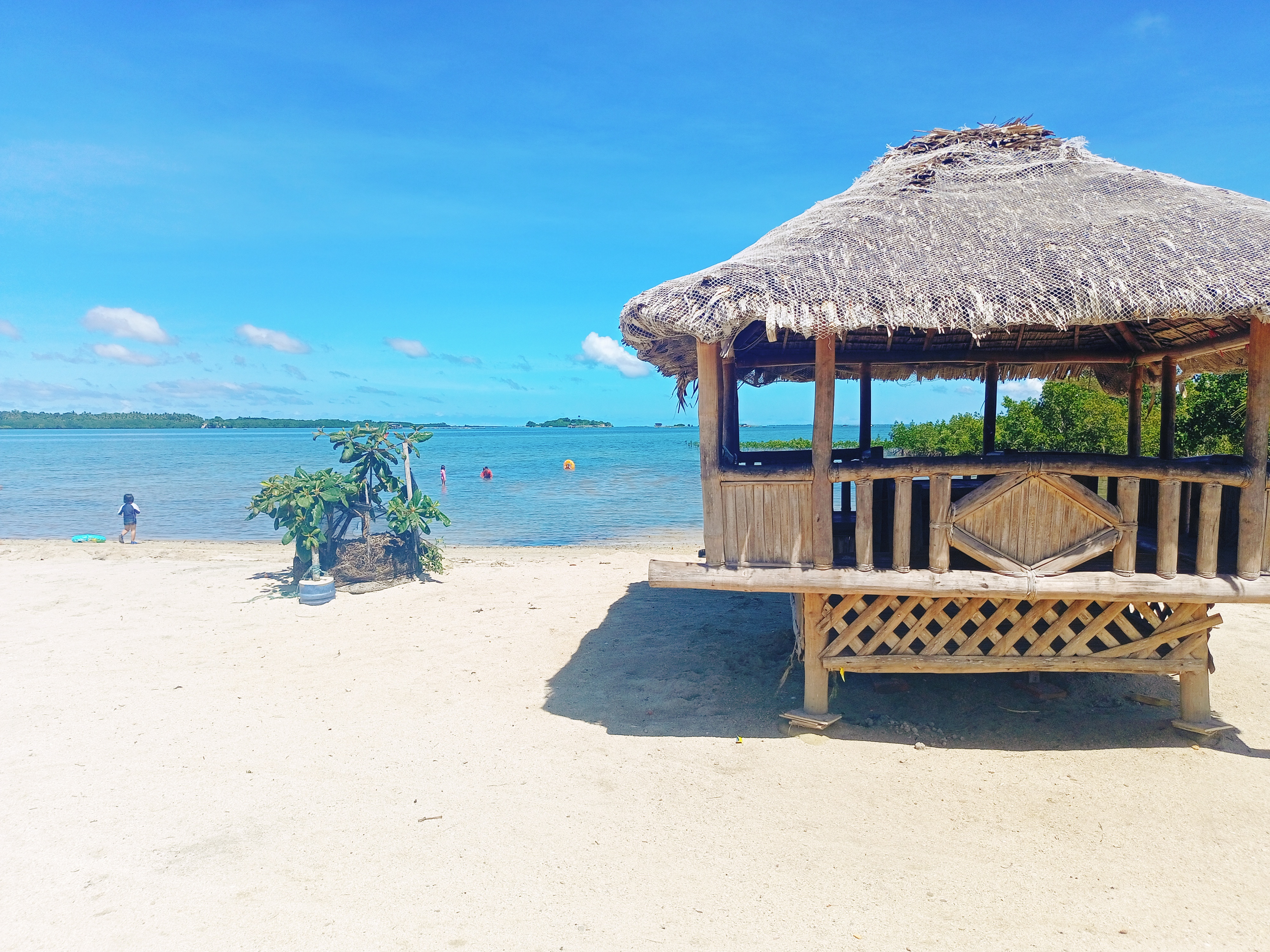
A nipa hut used to accommodate tourists on Negros in the Philippines

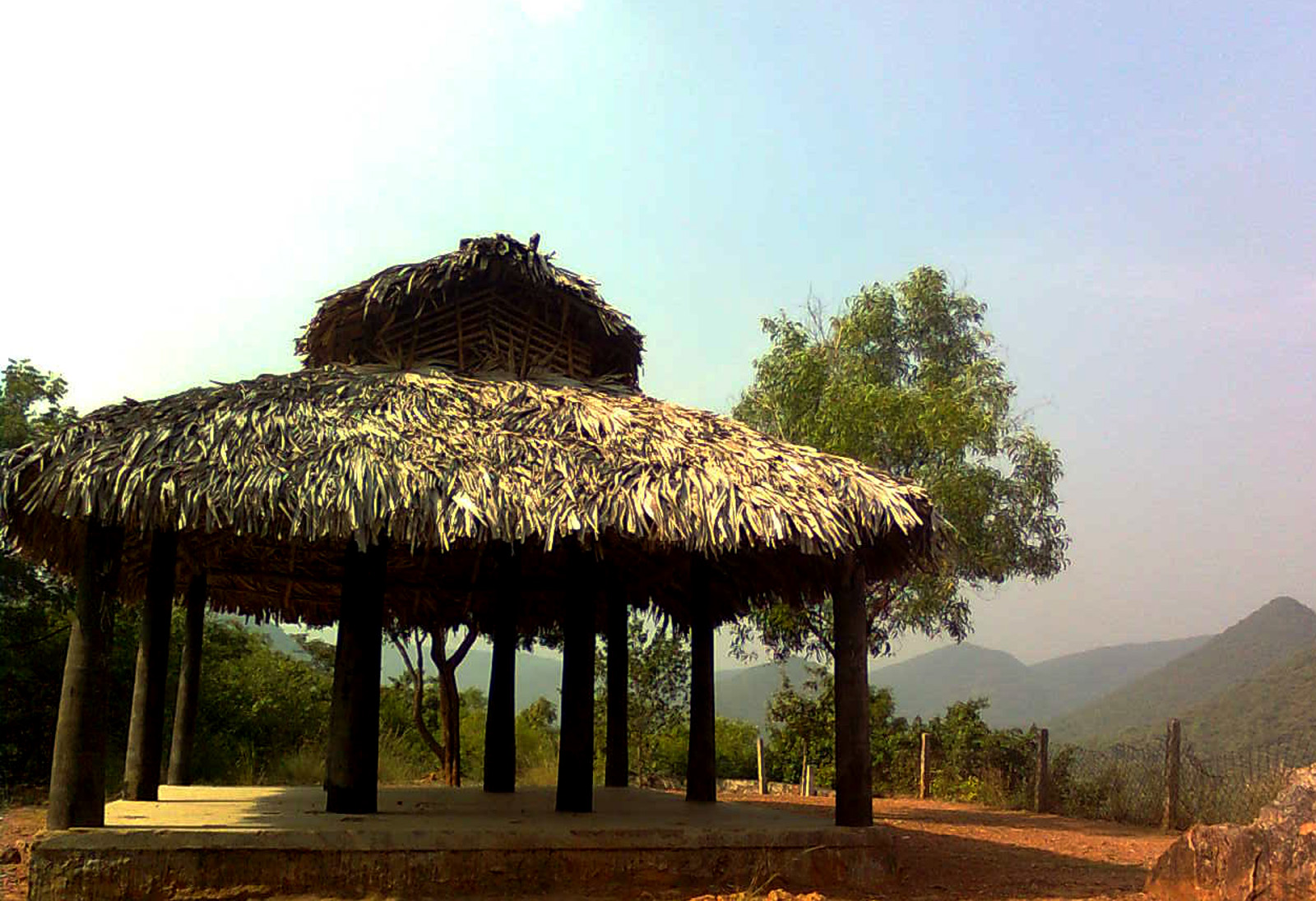
Hut in eastern India

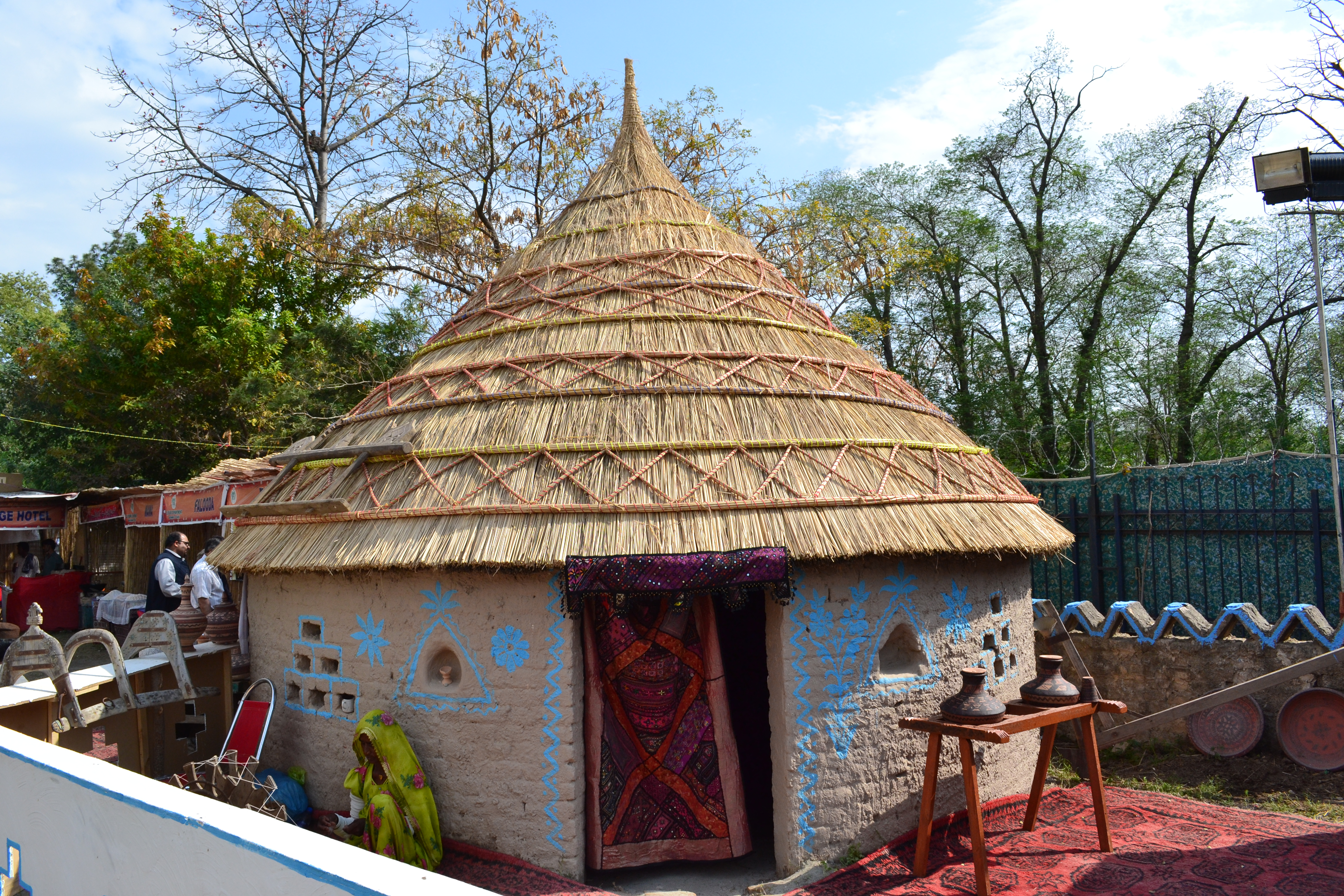
A hut in Tharparkar, Sindh

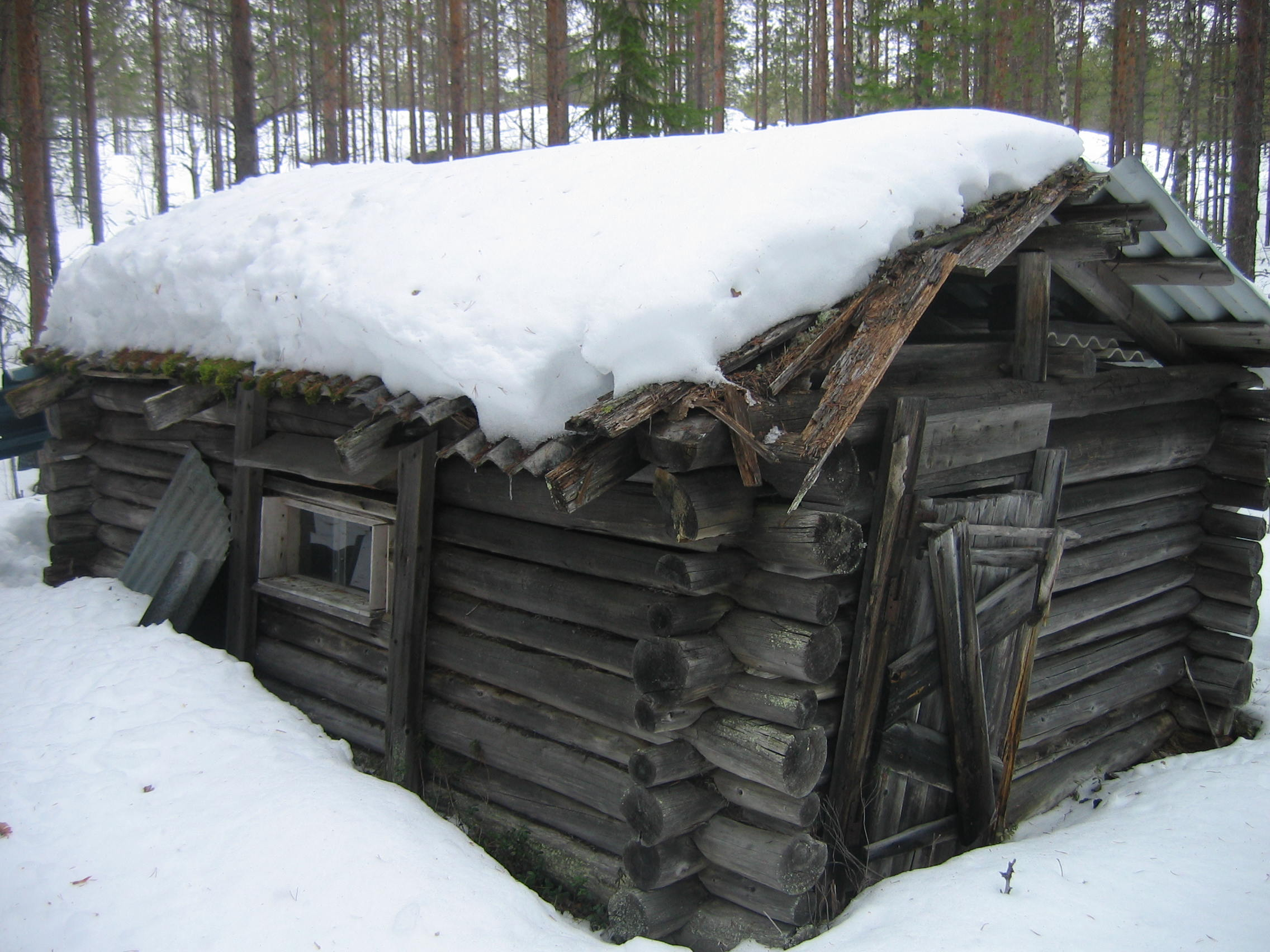
An old hunting hut in Utajärvi, Finland

== Types ==
Many huts are designed to be relatively quick and inexpensive to build. Construction often does not require specialized tools or knowledge.

Huts exist in practically all nomadic cultures, being built with materials such as wood, snow, stone, grass, palm leaves, branches, clay, hides, fabric, or mud using techniques passed down through the generations. Some huts are transportable and can stand most conditions of weather. In tropical and subtropical areas, huts used as homes allow for high airflow and heat dissipation.

=== Traditional ===
- Bahay kubo (Nipa hut) – a traditional Filipino stilt house made of bamboo and palm fronds as roofing. They are designed to be lightweight so they can be moved from one place to another by being carried by group of men, a practice commonly called bayanihan.
- Balok – a Siberian wilderness hut made of logs, usually communal, used by hunters, fishermen and travelers in the more distant parts of Siberia. Some baloks are mobile and mounted on sleds.
- Barabara – an earth sheltered winter home of the Aleut people
- Barracks – an old term for a temporary hut, now more used as a term for military housing and a unique hay storage structure called a hay barrack
- Bothy – originally a one-room hut for male farm workers in the United Kingdom, now a mountain hut for overnight hikers
- Burdei or bordei – a dugout or pit-house with a sod roof in Romania, Ukraine and Canada
- Cabana – an open shelter
- Dry stone huts
  - Clochán – Irish dry stone hut
  - Mitato – a small, dry stone hut in Greece
  - Orri – a French dry stone and sod hut
  - Sheiling – originally a temporary shelter or hut for shepherds, now may be a stone building. Common in Scotland.
  - Trullo - a dry stone hut in Apulia, Italy
- Earth lodge – Native American dwelling
- Heartebeest Hut – hut used by South African Trekboer built of reeds, sometimes plastered with mud
- Hytte – Norwegian cabin or hut
- Igloo – a hut made of hard snow or ice
- Kolba – Afghanistan hut
- Khata – Ukrainian traditional whitewashed wattle-and-daub hut, usually with two rooms, loft, and straw roof
- Lodge is a general term for a hut or cabin such as a log cabin or cottage. Lodge is used to refer to a tipi, sweat lodge, and hunting, fishing, skiing, and safari lodge.
- Rondavel – Central and South Africa
- Roundhouse (dwelling) – a circular hut or house typically with a conical roof
- Shepherd's hut – Mobile agricultural shelter
- Sod house – a pioneer house type on the American Plains where wood was scarce
- Sukkah – Israel and Jewish diaspora
- Tule hut – coastal North America, West Coast, Northern California
- Oca – Brazilian hut
- Quinzhee – Canadian snow shelter
- Yurt – Central and North Asia

=== Modern ===
- HORSA hut – a prefabricated school building built to cope with additional demand from the Education Act 1944
- Laing hut – a prefabricated lightweight timber wall sections bolted together, externally clad with plasterboard and felt; designed in 1940 for barrack accommodation
- Nissen hut – a prefabricated steel structure made from a semicircle of corrugated steel, invented in the early 20th century
  - Jamesway hut – a variation of a Nissen hut
  - Romney hut – a variation of a Nissen hut
  - Quonset hut – a type of Nissen hut of lightweight prefabricated structure of corrugated steel
- Pratten hut – a prefabricated building generally used in schools for classrooms in the UK after World War II
- Scout hut – term given for the buildings used as the meeting place of members of The Scout Association world-wide

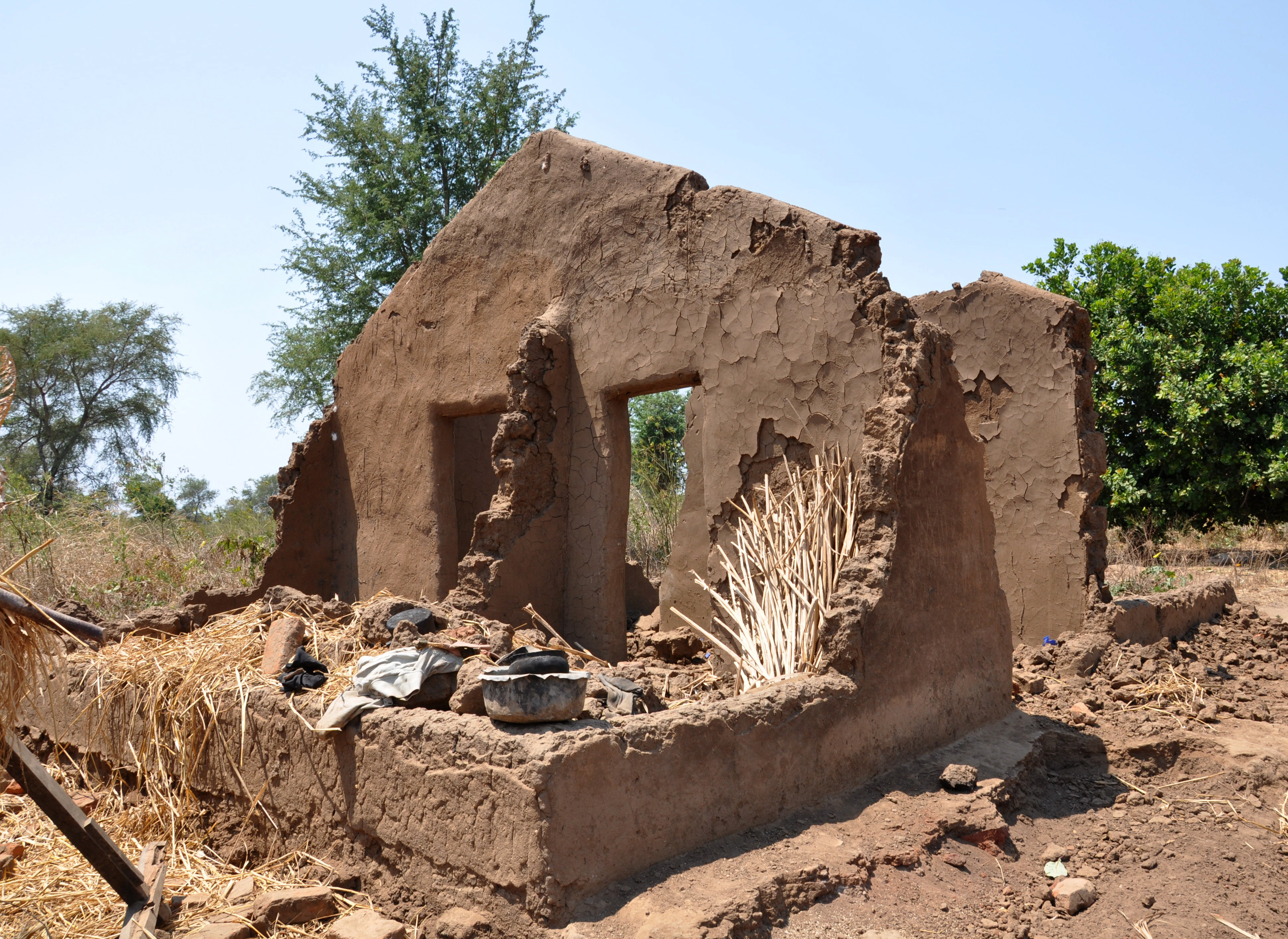
Remains of a mud hut, with interior layers exposed. This hut was destroyed during a major earthquake.

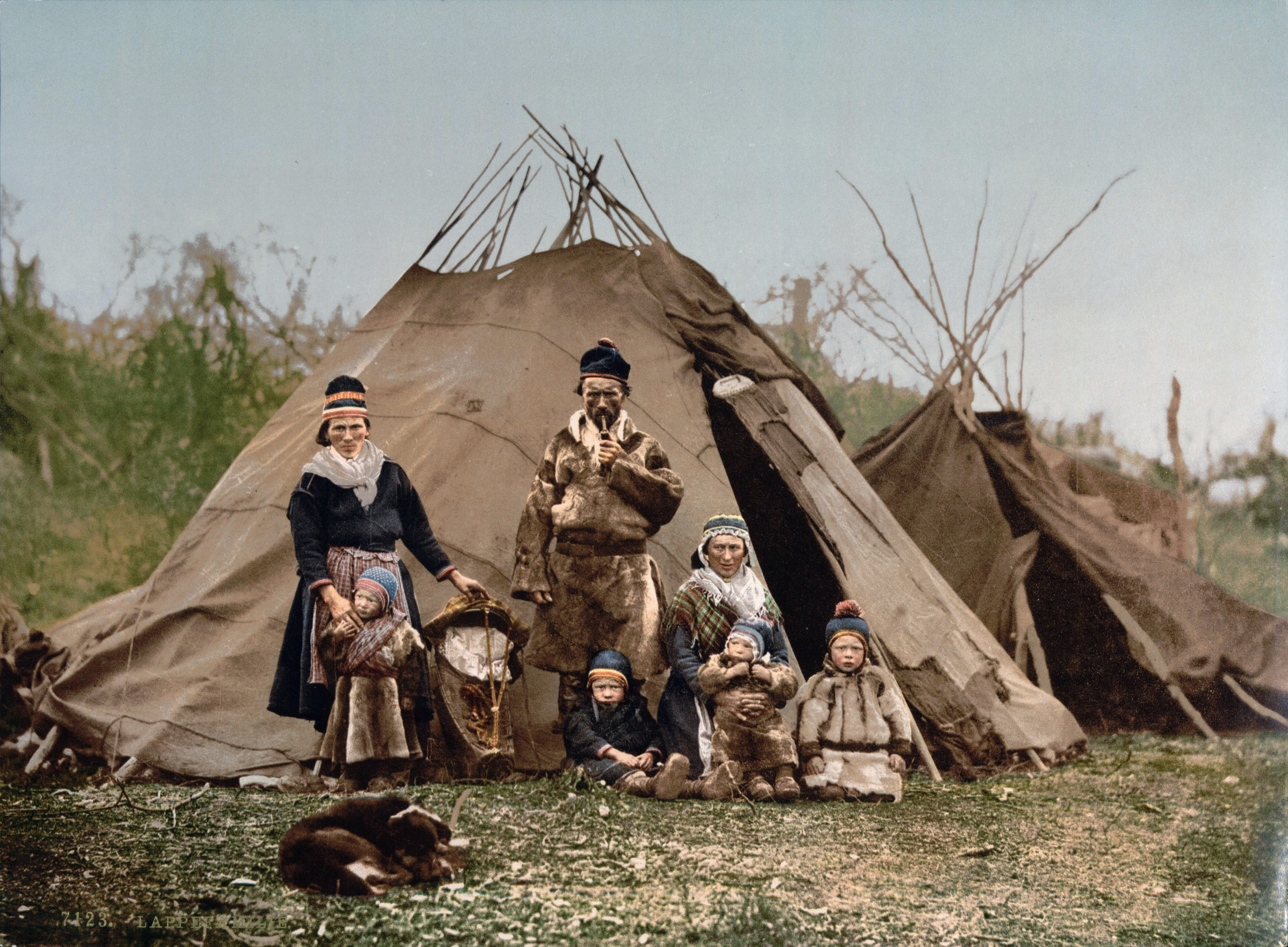
A Sámi family in front of goahti around 1900 in northern Scandinavia

== Marketing usage ==
The term is used to name many commercial stores, companies, and concepts. The name implies a small, casual venue, often with a fun and friendly atmosphere. Examples include Pizza Hut and Sunglass Hut. Kiosks may be constructed to look like huts and are often found at parks, malls, beaches, or other public places, selling a variety of inexpensive food or goods. Luxury hotels in tropical areas where guests are assigned to occupy their own freestanding structure sometimes call the structure a "hut", though such huts typically bear little more than superficial resemblance to the traditional concept of a hut.

== See also ==
- Cabane en pierre sèche – French dry stone huts
- Lean-to – a type of shelter
- Palloza – Spanish type of roundhouse
- The Primitive Hut – concept in architectural theory
- Tipi – Central North America tent
