= Ekşisu Picnic Area =

Coordinates: 39°44′01″N 39°36′53″E

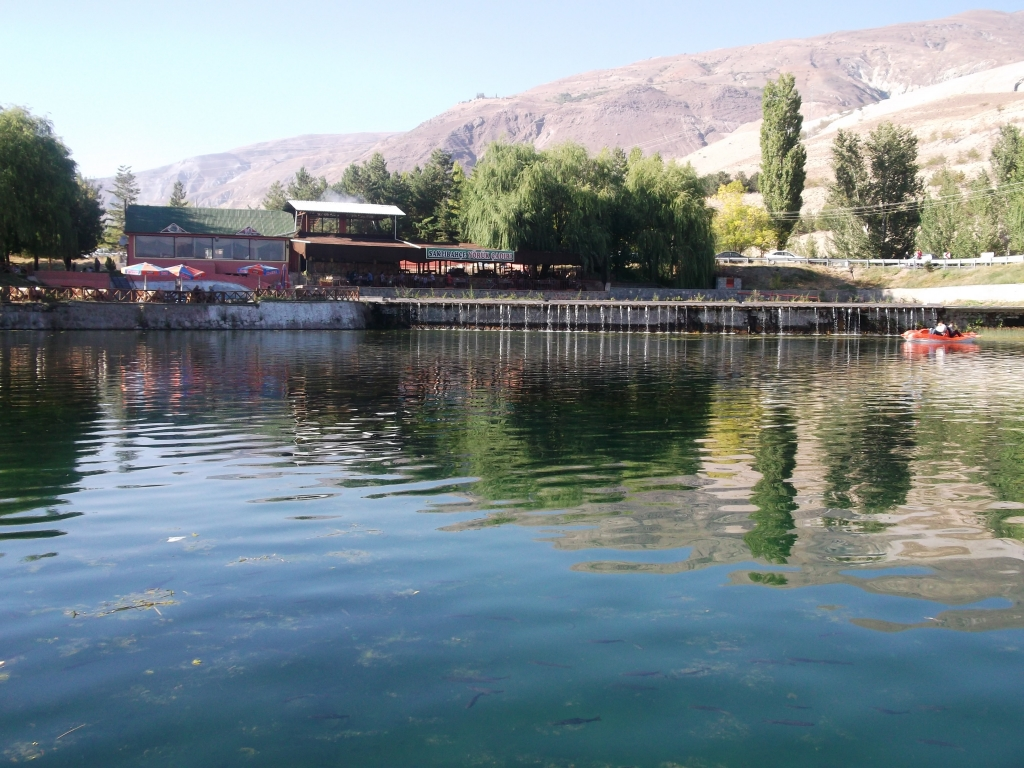
A view of the Ekşisu Picnic Area (September 2012).

Ekşisu Picnic Area (Turkish: Ekşisu Mesire Alanı) is an outdoor recreational area located in Erzincan, Turkey.

The picnic area is 11 km (6.8 mi) far from Erzincan city center. It covers an area of around 100,000 m^{2} (100 daa). Run by the Erzincan Municipality, it features playgrounds, amusement pools, walking trails, picnic tables and restaurants offering regional food. The region is rich on mineral water springs. The fountains at the picnic area, which spend mineral water free of charge, are popular.
