= Erzincan =

- Municipality
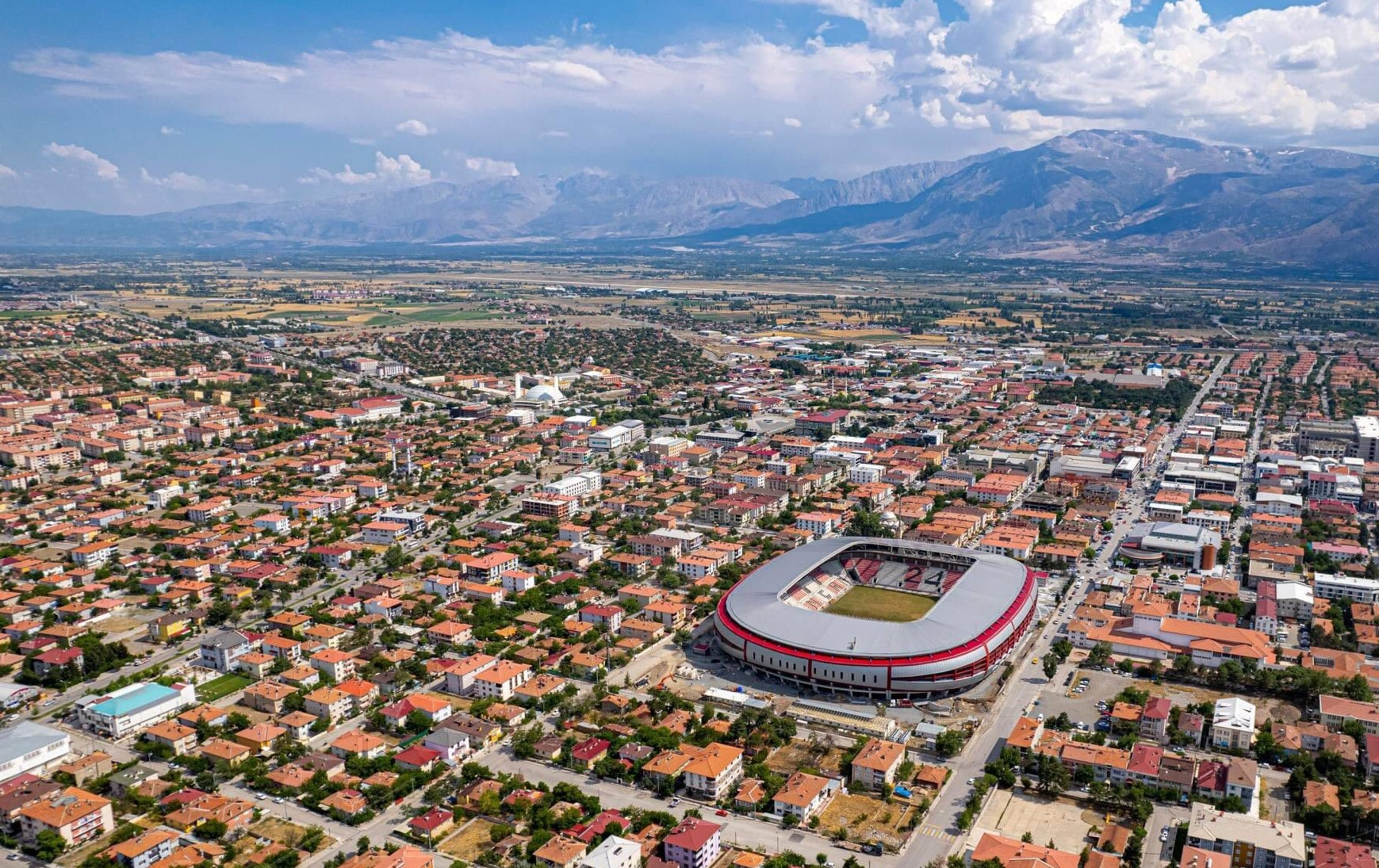
- View of Erzincan

- Coat of arms

- Location within Turkey
- Coordinates: 39°44′47″N 39°29′29″E
- Country: Turkey
- Province: Erzincan
- District: Erzincan

Government
  - Mayor: Bekir Aksun (MHP)
- Elevation: 1,185 m (3,888 ft)
- Population (2022): 150,714
- Time zone: UTC+3 (TRT)
- Website: www.erzincan.bel.tr

Erzincan (pronounced [æɾˈzindʒan]; Kurdish: Erzîngan), historically Yerznka (Armenian: Երզնկա), is the capital of Erzincan Province in eastern Turkey. Nearby cities include Erzurum, Sivas, Tunceli, Bingöl, Elazığ, Malatya, Gümüşhane, Bayburt, and Giresun. The city is majority Turkish Sunni with a Kurdish Alevi minority.

The city had a population of 150,714 in 2022, an increase from 86,779 in 2007.

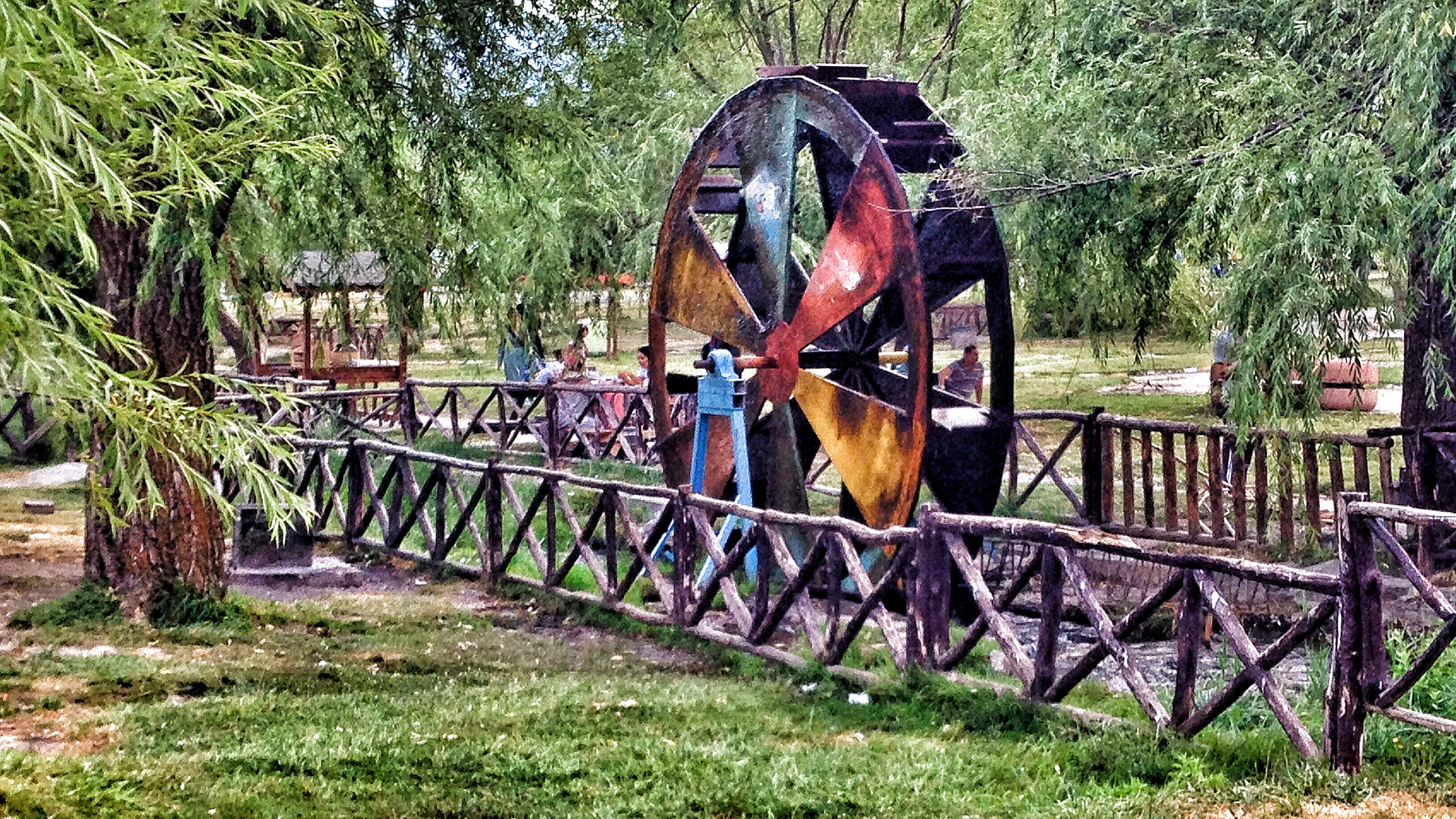
Erzincan Ekşisu Picnic Area Mill

== History ==
=== Name ===
Acilisene, the ancient region that is now Erzincan, was the site of the Peace of Acilisene by which in AD 387 Armenia was divided into two vassal states, a smaller one dependent on the Byzantine Empire and a larger one dependent on Persia. This is the name (Ἀκιλισηνή in Greek) by which it is called by Strabo in his Geography, 11.4.14. The etymological origin of the word is disputed, but it is agreed that the city was once called Erez. For a while it was called Justinianopolis in honour of Emperor Justinian. In more recent Greek it has been called as Κελτζηνή (Keltzene) and Κελεζηνή (Kelezene).

In the Armenian language, the 5th-century Life of Mashtots called it Yekeghiats. In the more recent past, it was known in Armenian as Երզնկա (Yerznka).

=== Christian history ===
In the settlement of Erez, at a yet unidentified site, there was a pre-Christian shrine dedicated to the Armenian goddess Anahit. A text of Agathangelos reports that during the first year of his reign, King Trdat of Armenia went to Erez and visited Anahit's temple to offer sacrifice. He ordered Gregory the Illuminator, who was secretly a Christian, to make an offering at its altar. When Gregory refused, he was taken captive and tortured, starting the events that would end with Trdat's conversion to Christianity some 14 years later. After that conversion, during the Christianisation of Armenia, the temple at Erez was destroyed and its property and lands were given to Gregory. It later became known for its extensive monasteries.

It is hard to tell when Acilisene became a bishopric. The first whose name is known is of the mid-5th century: Ioannes, who in 459 signed the decree of Patriarch Gennadius I of Constantinople against the simoniacs. Georgius or Gregorius (both forms are found) was one of the Fathers of the Second Council of Constantinople (553), appearing as "bishop of Justinianopolis". Theodorus was at the Third Council of Constantinople in 681, signing as "bishop of Justinianopolis or the region of Ecclenzine". Georgius was at the Photian Council of Constantinople (879). Until the 10th century, the diocese itself appears in none of the Notitiae Episcopatuum. At the end of that century, they present it as an autocephalous archdiocese, and those of the 11th century present it as a metropolitan see with 21 suffragans. This was the time of greatest splendour of Acilisene, which ended with the decisive defeat of the Byzantines by the Seljuk Turks at the Battle of Manzikert in 1071. After the 13th century, there is no mention of diocesan bishops of Acilisene and the see no longer appears in Notitiae Episcopatuum. No longer a residential bishopric, Acilisene is today listed by the Catholic Church as a titular see. In 1318-1319, the metropolitan see of Acilisene was given over to Theodosius of Melitene, since he "had been deprived of the consecrated seat by the foreigners". However, while in previous centuries, Acilisene, along with Cortzene and Taron, had 22 bishoprics, by the early 14th century its only significant possession was the monastery of Ci. Thereafter, the metropolitan see remained vacant and had disappeared before the 15th century.

=== High and Late Middle Ages ===
In 1071 Erzincan was absorbed into the Mengüjek under the Seljuk Sulëiman Kutalmish. Marco Polo, who wrote about his visit to Erzincan, said that the "people of the country are Armenians" and that Erzincan was the "noblest of cities" which contained the see of an archbishop. In 1243 it was destroyed in fighting between the Seljuks under Kaykhusraw II and the Mongols. However, by 1254 its population had recovered enough that William of Rubruck was able to say an earthquake had killed more than 10,000 people. During this period, the city reached a level of semi-independence under the rule of Armenian princes.

Erzincan was one of the most pivotal towns in Safavid history. It was there, in the summer of 1500, that about 7,000 Qizilbash forces, consisting of the Ustaclu, Shamlu, Rumlu, Tekelu, Zhulkadir, Afshar, Qajar and Varsak tribes, responded to the invitation of Ismail I, who would aid in him establishing his dynasty.

=== Ottoman Era ===
After the 1514 capture of the city by Ottoman forces, Erzincan developed physically and in terms of population. According to the census made in 1516–1518 shortly after the conquest, there were twenty neighbourhoods in the city, seven of which belonged to Muslims and 13 to Christians. The number of neighbourhoods did not change in the 1530 and 1591 censuses but the population increased. Evliya Çelebi, who came to Erzincan in 1647, wrote that the castle was built on a flat field, and that there were 200 houses inside this place while 1800 houses were located outside the castle. It had 48 neighbourhoods, seven mosques, seven lodges, and 11 hamams. According to the General Census of 1881/82, the sanjak of Erzincan within the Erzurum vilayet had a total population of 107,090, consisting of 85,943 Muslims and 19,026 Armenians, 1,887 Greeks and 234 Protestants. Vital Cuinet's research dating to 1893 show that there were 23,000 people in the centre of Erzincan of which 15,000 were Muslims and 7,500 were Armenian. In the same research he states that the entire sanjak had 171,472 Muslims, 34,588 Armenians (incl. Catholic & Protestan) and 2,710 Greeks. According to the 1914 Ottoman census, which undercounted religious minority groups such as Armenians, there were 53,898 Muslims and 16,144 Armenian Gregorians and 147 Protestants in the central kaza. In the other kazas of Erzincan there were 67,271 Muslims, 11,135 Armenian Gregorians and 144 Protestants in Kemah.

==== Armenian genocide ====
According to the 1914 Ottoman census, which undercounted religious minority groups such as Armenians, there were 16,144 Armenian Gregorians and 147 Protestants in the central kaza. In the other kazas of Erzincan there were 11,135 Armenian Gregorians and 144 Protestants in Kemah. However, Miller and Kévorkian's research state that the Armenians in the centre of Erzincan were more than double the census data. Of the pre-World War I population of 37,000 Armenians in Erzincan and suburbs, most were killed in the Armenian genocide. During this period, at least 150,000 Armenian men, women and children from Erzincan and surrounding areas were transported by Turkish forces between 1915 and 1916 through Erzincan proper, where a series of transit camps were set up to control the flow of victims to the concentration camp and killing site at the nearby Kemah gorge. J.M. Winter's work state that between 1915 and 1917, the Central Hospital of Erzincan was the primary site of medical experiments conducted by Turkish army physicians on Armenian civilians involving typhus and other lethal infectious agents. As of 2019, few traces of Armenian presence or civilization remain in Erzincan.

==== Battle of Erzincan ====
The Battle of Erzincan took place during the Caucasus Campaign of the First World War. In 1916 Erzincan was the headquarters for the Turkish Third Army commanded by Abdul Kerim Pasha. The Russian General Nikolai Yudenich led the Russian Caucasus Army who captured Mama Hatun on 12 July 1916. They then gained the heights of Naglika and took a Turkish position on the banks of the Durum Durasi river, with their cavalry breaking through the Boz-Tapa-Meretkli line. They then advanced on Erzincan arriving by 25 July and taking the city in two days. The city was relatively untouched by battle and Yudenich seized large quantities of supplies. Despite the strategic advantages gained from this victory, Yudenich made no more significant advances and his forces were reduced due to Russian reverses further north.

==== Erzincan Soviet ====
A short-lived soviet council had been at Erzincan between 1916 and 1918. Mainly today's Erzincan and Tunceli provinces were under Russian occupation. After the revolution, Bolshevik soldiers took control of the officer corps. Arshak Djamalian who was a Bolshevik soldier, called Kurdish, Turkish, and Armenian representatives to take charge of the administration of Erzincan Soviet.

==== Capture of Erzincan (1918) ====
Following the withdrawal of the Russian Army, the commander of the First Caucasian Army Corps Kâzım Karabekir regained control over Erzincan on the 13 February 1918. This event is celebrated annually by its inhabitants. The capture was carried out by Kâzım Karabekir. The city witnessed a state of "indescribable panic" as Armenian soldiers evacuated Erzincan towards Erzurum. Both civilian and military troops were attacked by Kurdish tribes, all during brutal snowstorms. Meanwhile, Armenian fedayeen fought "ferociously" in rearguard actions, while the under-equipped and famished Ottoman army found sustenance and weaponry in abandoned Russian arsenals and reserves. The events at Erzincan repeated on a larger scale in Erzurum and Kars.

=== Turkish Republic ===
==== 1939 Erzincan earthquake ====
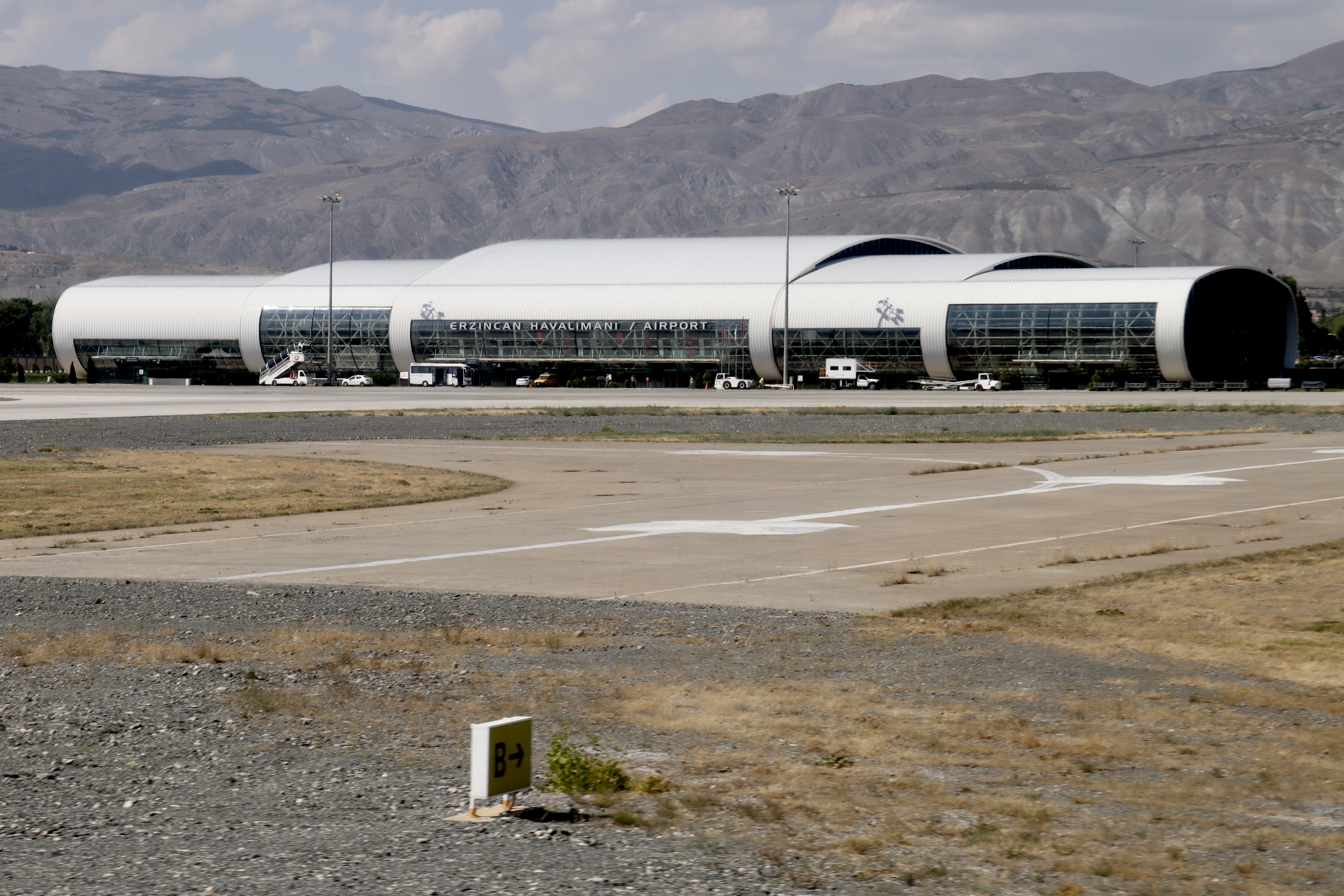
The airport terminal

The city was completely destroyed by a major earthquake on December 27, 1939. The sequence of seven violent shocks, the biggest measuring 7.8 on the moment magnitude scale, was the joint most-powerful earthquake recorded in Turkey, tied with the 2023 Turkey–Syria earthquake. The first stage of the earthquake killed about 8,000 people. The next day, it was reported that the death toll had risen to 20,000. An emergency relief operation began. By the end of the year, 32,962 had died due to more earthquakes and several floods. So extensive was the damage to Erzincan city that its old site was entirely abandoned, and a new town was founded a little further to the north.

== Demographics ==
In the 13th century, Marco Polo noted that the city's population was Armenian. In 1830, the Armenian population reached 15,000. In 1880, Erzincan had 6,000 houses: 4,000 Muslim and 1,800 Armenian. In the 1890s, Vital Cuinet reported that Erzincan had 23,000 inhabitants: 15,000 Muslims, 7,500 Armenians, and the rest Greeks and others. According to data from the Armenian Patriarchate of Constantinople, Erzincan harboured 24,000 inhabitants on the eve of World War I; 13,109 (2021 families) of whom were Armenians. Armenians were deported and massacred by the Special Organization during the Armenian genocide. Greeks were deported from Erzincan to Germir in 1919 as part of the Greek genocide.

== Climate ==
Erzincan has a humid continental climate (Köppen climate classification: Dsa or Trewartha climate classification: Dca) with cold, snowy winters and hot, dry summers. Spring is the wettest season whilst summer is the driest. The lowest temperature recorded was −31.2 °C (−24.2 °F) on 15 January 1950. The highest temperature recorded was 40.6 °C (105.1 °F) on 30 July 2000. The highest snow thickness recorded was 74 cm (29.1 inches) in February 1950.

Climate data for Erzincan (1991–2020, extremes 1929–2022)
| Month | Jan | Feb | Mar | Apr | May | Jun | Jul | Aug | Sep | Oct | Nov | Dec | Year |
|---|---|---|---|---|---|---|---|---|---|---|---|---|---|
| Record high °C (°F) | 14.6 (58.3) | 17.2 (63.0) | 25.2 (77.4) | 30.0 (86.0) | 33.8 (92.8) | 37.0 (98.6) | 40.6 (105.1) | 40.5 (104.9) | 37.2 (99.0) | 31.4 (88.5) | 24.9 (76.8) | 19.0 (66.2) | 40.6 (105.1) |
| Mean daily maximum °C (°F) | 2.8 (37.0) | 4.8 (40.6) | 10.9 (51.6) | 17.3 (63.1) | 22.7 (72.9) | 27.9 (82.2) | 32.4 (90.3) | 33.0 (91.4) | 28.1 (82.6) | 20.7 (69.3) | 12.0 (53.6) | 5.1 (41.2) | 18.1 (64.6) |
| Daily mean °C (°F) | −1.9 (28.6) | −0.3 (31.5) | 5.3 (41.5) | 11.0 (51.8) | 15.7 (60.3) | 20.5 (68.9) | 24.3 (75.7) | 24.5 (76.1) | 19.6 (67.3) | 13.2 (55.8) | 5.7 (42.3) | 0.5 (32.9) | 11.5 (52.7) |
| Mean daily minimum °C (°F) | −5.7 (21.7) | −4.3 (24.3) | 0.5 (32.9) | 5.5 (41.9) | 9.5 (49.1) | 13.4 (56.1) | 16.7 (62.1) | 16.8 (62.2) | 12.0 (53.6) | 7.0 (44.6) | 0.9 (33.6) | −3.1 (26.4) | 5.8 (42.4) |
| Record low °C (°F) | −31.2 (−24.2) | −30.2 (−22.4) | −22.4 (−8.3) | −11.1 (12.0) | −4.2 (24.4) | 2.0 (35.6) | 5.0 (41.0) | 5.9 (42.6) | 0.3 (32.5) | −6.8 (19.8) | −15.6 (3.9) | −25.9 (−14.6) | −31.2 (−24.2) |
| Average precipitation mm (inches) | 26.3 (1.04) | 29.7 (1.17) | 45.5 (1.79) | 54.2 (2.13) | 57.2 (2.25) | 25.2 (0.99) | 14.1 (0.56) | 6.6 (0.26) | 17.5 (0.69) | 41.9 (1.65) | 36.2 (1.43) | 25.7 (1.01) | 380.1 (14.96) |
| Average precipitation days | 8.77 | 9.17 | 11.63 | 13.67 | 14.77 | 8.83 | 3.67 | 2.93 | 4.53 | 8.87 | 8 | 9.37 | 104.2 |
| Average snowy days | 8.68 | 6.36 | 4.24 | 0.64 | 0 | 0 | 0 | 0 | 0 | 0.2 | 1.24 | 4.88 | 26.24 |
| Average relative humidity (%) | 72 | 68.9 | 61.5 | 57.1 | 57 | 50.8 | 46.3 | 46 | 49.2 | 62 | 67.8 | 72.5 | 59.2 |
| Mean monthly sunshine hours | 91.6 | 120.3 | 145.2 | 167.9 | 211.2 | 263.9 | 295.2 | 276.6 | 231.2 | 186.6 | 128.8 | 82.8 | 2,196.8 |
| Mean daily sunshine hours | 3.0 | 4.3 | 4.7 | 5.6 | 6.8 | 8.8 | 9.5 | 8.9 | 7.7 | 6.1 | 4.3 | 2.9 | 6.1 |
Source 1: Turkish State Meteorological Service
Source 2: NOAA(humidity, sun 1991-2020), Meteomanz(snowy days 2000-2024)

== Neighborhoods ==
Erzincan is divided into the neighborhoods of Akşemsettin, Aktoprak, Akyazı, Aslancak, Arslanlı, Atatürk, Aziz Baba, Bahçelievler, Barbaros, Barış, Başbağlar, Başpınar, Bayrak, Bozyazı, Buğdaylı, Bulutlu, Büyük Çakırman, Cemal Gürsel, Cumhuriyet, Çarşı, Çukurkuyu, Davarlı, Demetevler, Demirkent, Dereyurt, Ergenekon, Ersevenler, Ertuğrul Gazi, Esentepe, Fatih, Gazi, Gölcük, Gülalibey, Güllüce, H.Ahmet Yesevi, Halitpaşa, Hamidiye, Hancı, Hocabey, Hürrempalangası, Işıkpınar, İnönu, İzzetpaşa, Karaağaç, Kavakyolu, Kazımkarabekir, Keklikkayası, Kızılay, Kurutilek, Menderes, Mengüceli, Mimarsinan, Munzur, Mustafa Kemal Paşa, Osman Gazi, Osmanlı, Özgürlük, Paşa, Sancak, Sarıgöl, Selçuklu, Şehit Cengiz Topel, Şehit Serhat, Şehit Serhat Yurtbaşı, Taksim, Terzibaba, Ulalar, Üçkonak, Yalnızbağ, Yavuzselim, Yeni, Yenidoğan and Yunusemre.

== Economy ==
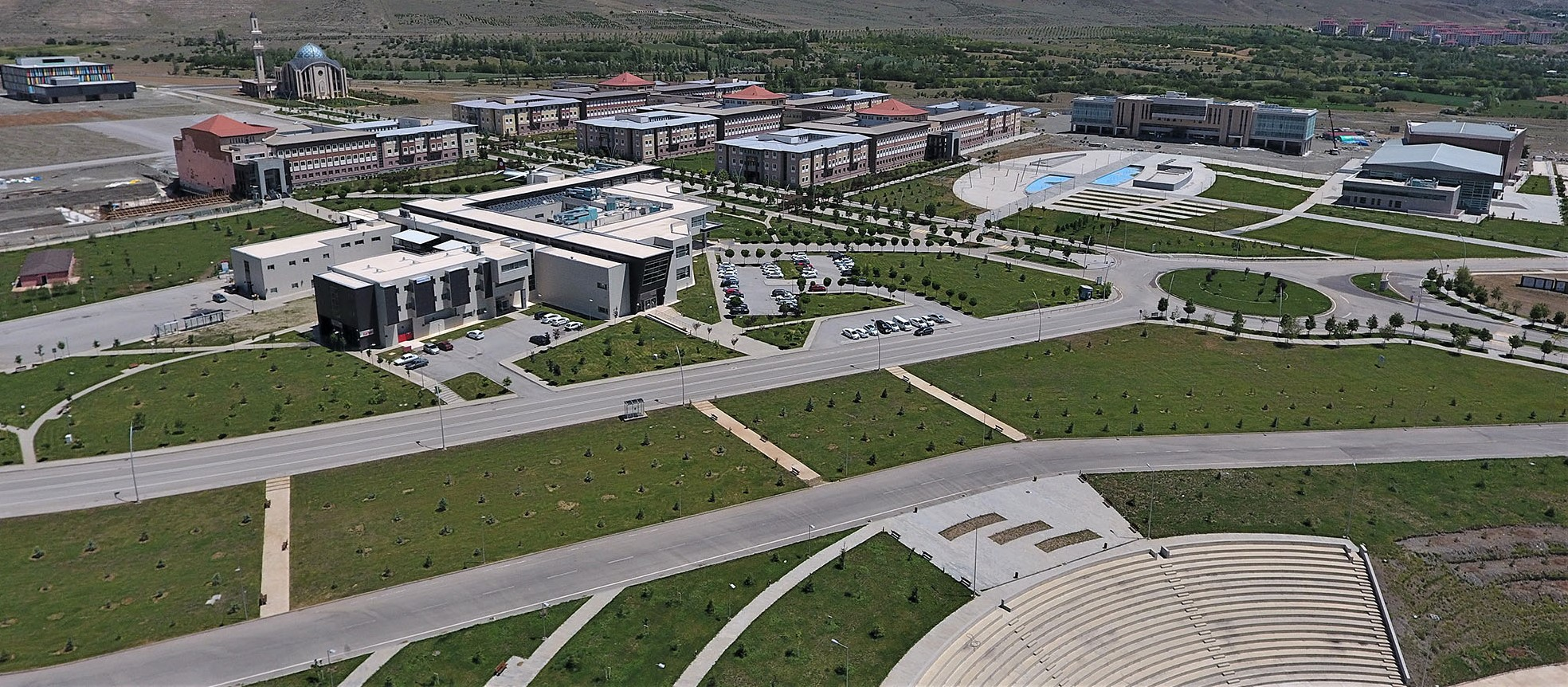
Erzincan Binali Yıldırım University

Mulberry tree plantations were found in Erzincan in the early 20th century, which were used in sericulture.

== Notable people ==
- See Category:People from Erzincan

== Mayors of Erzincan ==
- 1977–1980 and 1984–1989 Adnan Ercan MHP, ANAP
- 1989–1999 Talip Kaban MÇP, MHP
- 1999–2004 Erkan Karaman MHP
- 2004–2009 Mehmet Buyruk AK Party
- 2009–2014 Yüksel Çakır AK Party
- 2014–2019 Cemalettin Başsoy AK Party
- 2019–present Bekir Aksun MHP

== Twin towns – sister cities ==
Erzincan is twinned with:

- Köprülü, North Macedonia (2013)
- Hilvan, Turkey (2015)
- Derik, Turkey (2017)
- Tahir, Turkey (2017)
