= Justinianopolis in Armenia =

Former name of Erzincan, Turkey

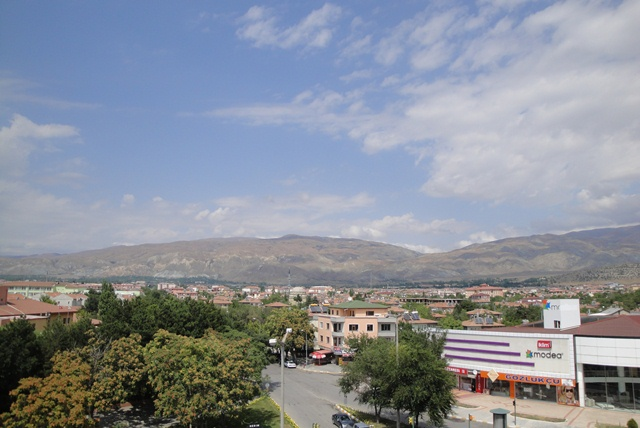
The area around Justinianopolis (Erzincan) in 2011.

Justinianopolis in Armenia, also known as Iustinianopolis, was a Roman and Byzantine era city and bishopric in Lesser Armenia. It has been identified with modern Erzincan, Turkey. It was one of several ancient sites renamed in late Antiquity after Byzantine emperor Justinian I. The city also known as Acilisene and Keltzene.

The town was also known as Acilisene and Keltzene, Eliza and Erzindjan. Acilisene was a province situated between the Euphrates and Antitaurus, where Mithridates VI of Pontus, pursued by Pompey, sought refuge.

== Bishopric ==
It is hard to tell when Acilisene became a bishopric. The first bishop is attested in the mid-5th century, Le Quien mentions six bishops:

- Ioannes, who in 459 signed the decree of Patriarch Gennadius I of Constantinople against the simoniacs.
- Georgius or Gregorius (both forms are found) was one of the Fathers of the Second Council of Constantinople (553),

appearing as "bishop of Justinianopolis".

- Theodorus was at the Third Council of Constantinople in 681, signing as "bishop of Justinianopolis or the region of Ecclenzine".
- Georgius was at the Photian Council of Constantinople (879).

Until the 10th century, the diocese itself appears in none of the Notitiae Episcopatuum. By 980, they present it as an autocephalous archdiocese, and those of the 11th century present it as a metropolitan see with 21 suffragans. This was the time of greatest splendour of Acilisene, which ended with the decisive defeat of the Byzantines by the Seljuq Turks at the Battle of Manzikert in 1071 when the Seljuqs invaded. The diocese survived the Islamic invasion and was still extant when Marco Polo visited the town. After the 13th century there is no mention of diocesan bishops of Acilisene and the see no longer appears in Notitiae Episcopatuum.

No longer a residential bishopric, Acilisene is today listed by the Roman Catholic Church as a titular see.
