= Phygela =

Scientific classification
- Kingdom: Animalia
- Phylum: Arthropoda
- Clade: Pancrustacea
- Class: Insecta
- Order: Orthoptera
- Suborder: Ensifera
- Family: Tettigoniidae
- Subfamily: Phaneropterinae
- Tribe: Holochlorini
- Genus: Phygela; Stål, 1876

Genus of insects

Phygela is a genus of bush crickets in the tribe Holochlorini, erected by Carl Stål in 1876, with species found in Malesia.

== Species ==
The Orthoptera species file lists:

1. Phygela haanii Stål, 1876 - type species
2. Phygela latipennis Karny, 1931
3. Phygela marginata Brunner von Wattenwyl, 1878
