= Jamesway hut =

Prefabricated insulated structure designed for polar conditions

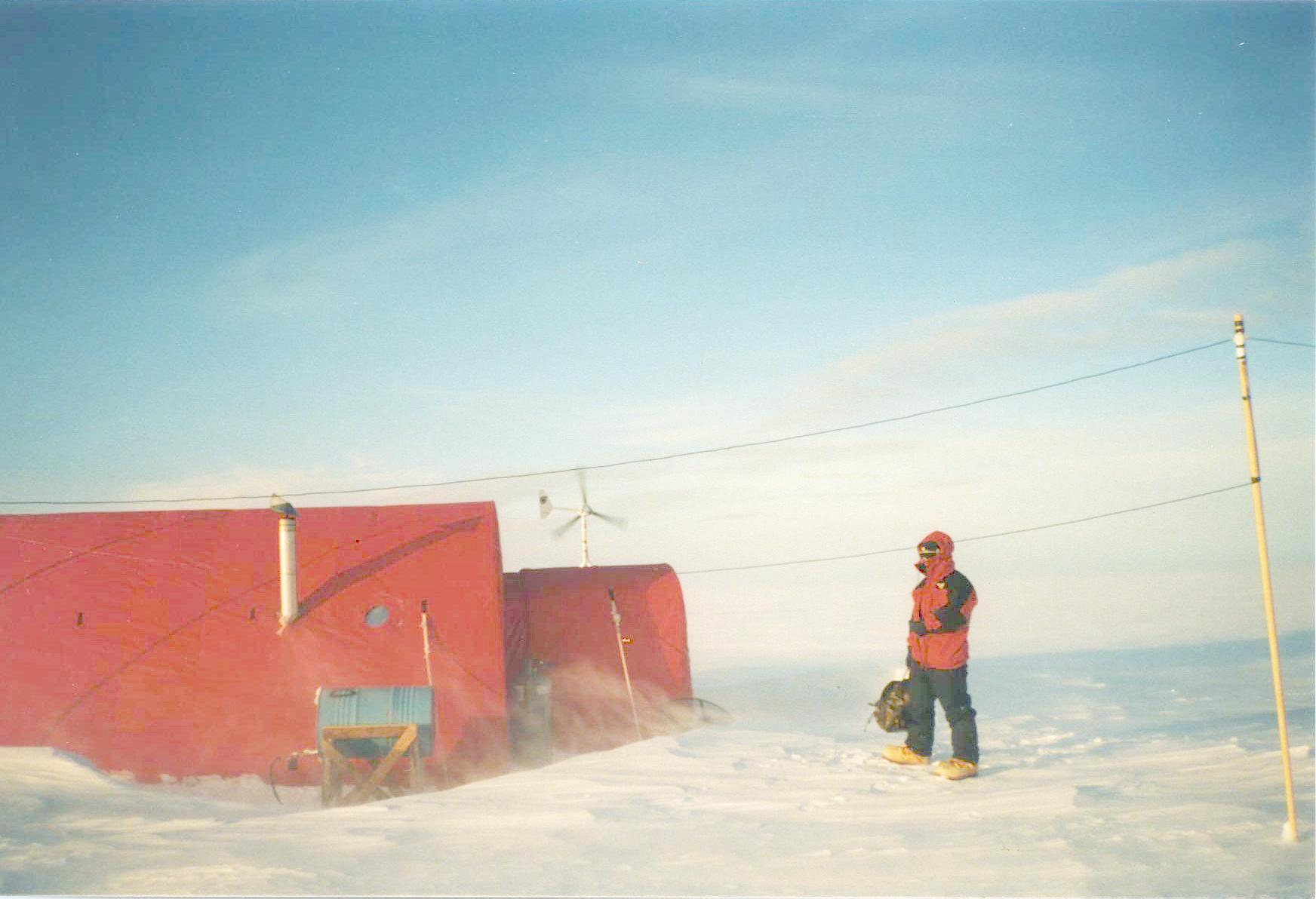
Jamesway hut at Camp Raven station in Greenland.

The Jamesway hut is a portable and easy-to-assemble hut, designed for polar weather conditions. This version of the Quonset hut was created by James Manufacturing Company of Fort Atkinson, Wisconsin. A Jamesway hut had wooden ribs and a type of insulated fabric covering then used by the Army Air Corps. Insulated blankets in 1.2 m (3 ft 11 in)-wide lengths were made with glass fiber insulation faced with flame-proof muslin and enclosed in plastic-treated cotton that was water-, vermin-, and fire-proof. The hardware (nails, fasteners, and connecting bars) was the only metal component. The whole package weighed 540 kg (1,190 lb) for a 5 metres (16 ft)-square hut. Its wooden packing crates were designed for reuse as the hut floor.

The storage/floor sections, each 1.2 by 2.4 m (3 ft 11 in by 7 ft 10 in) were made from plywood and insulated with R-7 fiberglass insulation, which provided a portable, warm and cleanable floor. The wooden arches holding up the roof were attached to the floor sections with steel fittings and wing nuts, and were strong enough to hold a winter's snow. The arches, the key to the design, were curved, glue-laminated wooden 15 cm (6 in) beams on 1.2 m (3 ft 11 in) centers that folded in quarters on steel hinges and removable pins.

The hut became famous for providing portable warmth and shelter for the U.S. Armed Forces when the Japanese invaded the far Aleutian Islands in Alaska during World War II. More huts were manufactured in the late 1940s for use in the Korean War; many of these have been used by the U.S. Antarctic Program (USAP) from the initial Operation Deep Freeze operation from 1956 to 1961 in support of the International Geophysical Year (IGY), up to the present time.
