= Burqush =

Archeological site in Syria

- برقش (Arabic)
- Burkush, Barkousa, Justinianopolis, Barkousa-Justinianopolis
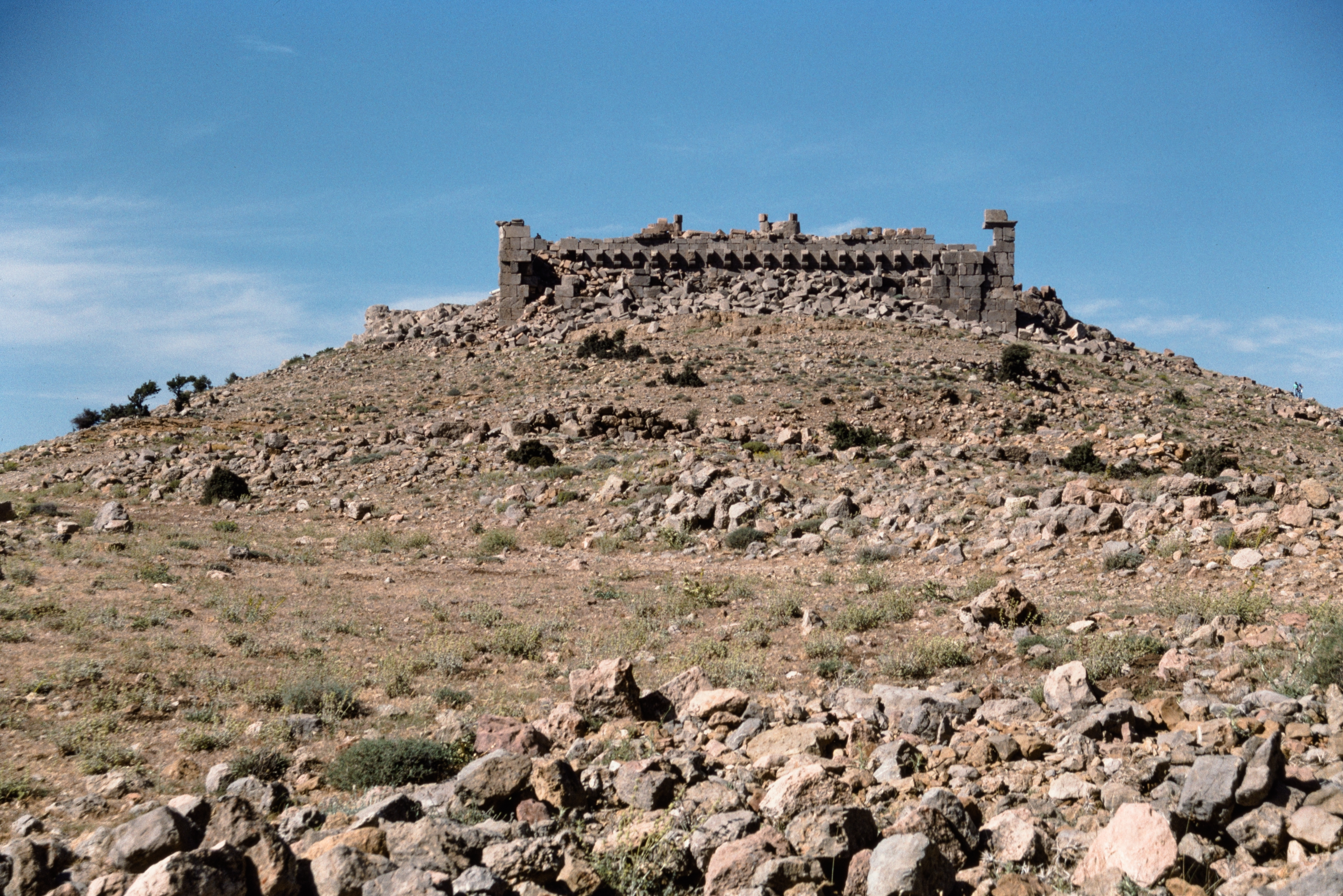
- Basilica platform in Burqush, from the south

- Location within Syria
- 33.466667°N 35.983333°E
- Cultures: Byzantine, Roman
- Location: 30 kilometres (19 mi) west of Damascus
- Region: Rif Dimashq Governorate

Site notes
- Excavation dates: 1999
- Archaeologists: Gunnar Brands
- Condition: Ruins
- Public access: Yes

Burqush or Burkush (Arabic: برقش) is an archaeological site situated 30 kilometres (19 mi) west of Damascus, Syria.

The nearby Wadi al-Qarn is an important breeding site for wild birds in the Middle East and has been identified by BirdLife International as an Important Bird Area.

The site sits at an altitude of 1,580 metres (5,180 ft) and overlooks the Damascus plain and surrounding hill country where herds of goats and camels wander the area. Due to the sensitive nature of the territory close to the borders with Lebanon and the Golan, visitors may need a military escort to access the site, which is a ten-minute walk along a steep track away from the main road.

Julien Aliquot suggested that the site may have been called Barkousa in ancient times. This was contrary to the location of Barkusha that had previously been suggested by Albrecht Alt in 1947. In the 6th century, it was renamed Justinianopolis (Greek: Ἰουστινιανούπολις, "city of Justinian") after the Byzantine emperor Justinian I.

== Byzantine basilica and Roman temple ==
There are the ruins of two Roman temples in the village that are included in a group of Temples of Mount Hermon.

The ruins of a 6th-century CE Byzantine basilica lie on the top of a hill which has been artificially flattened to form a two level plateau. The area around features numerous rock cut rooms and crypts. The podium on which the basilica is constructed is suggested to be that of a previous Roman temple suggested to date to the 1st century CE. The Roman temple itself is thought to have been built on the remains of a previous temple that had been in use for secular purposes for at least four hundred years earlier and possibly for many generations prior. The basilica is constructed of massive blocks of stone and the site is littered with other confusing blocks, some of which possibly resemble buildings or unusual geological outcrops.

The temple complex at Burqush was mentioned by the German archaeological mission to Baalbek in 1903 and has received little study since then. A topographic and architectural survey of the site was conducted in 1999 by Gunnar Brands for the University of Halle-Wittenberg. A dissertation covering the results of the survey is in progress by Frederike von Bargen.

The survey noted complex substructures, and intended to document the surrounding settlements, tombs, quarries and a propylon temple ruins. The survey was hampered by the remoteness and altitude of the site, tank shelling, and finding a settlement in the area that was twice as large as expected with numerous rock cut tombs nearby. The basement of the basilica was constructed from bedrock and showed a high technical quality of construction. Traces of bronze candle holders were found along with remnants of a marble cover that was white with gray veining. Twelve capitals were recorded in 1903, of which only eight remained in place, with three more displaced nearby, one reused for medieval farming. The twelfth capital had been covered in rubble and totally obscured. The east wall of the basilica features a portico. Foundations of what were thought to be a peristyle for the basilica were found to its north west, some of the area to the north was cleared and leveled by the military. The remains of the settlement are dispersed on the east slope of the hill are also large buildings on the west slope.
