= Orri =

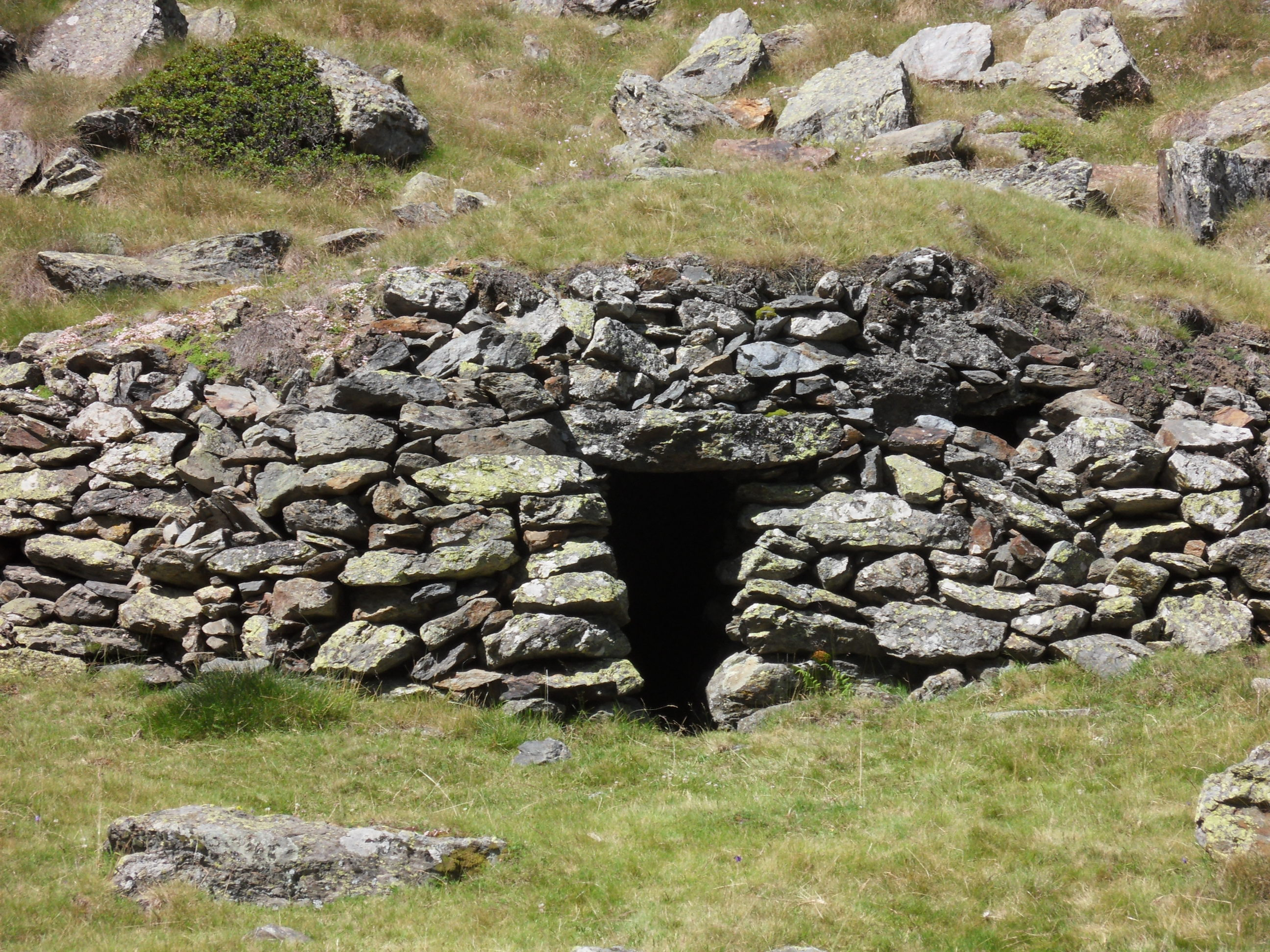
Summer hut of the Estrets in the Vicdessos region in the Ariège département (French Pyrenees)

Traditionally, an orri referred to an "enclosed area for gathering sheep" in the Eastern Pyrenees. In the late twentieth century, the word has taken on the erroneous meaning of "drystone hut" in Ariège.

== Ariège orris ==
=== In scholarly studies ===
In higher Vicdessos, a part of the French département of Ariège, the word orri traditionally referred to a summer mountain habitat consisting of an enclosed area for gathering sheep and a number of stone huts used as dwellings or for cheese making.

In the 1960s, when the long-deserted orris of Ariège were rediscovered by scholars, their ancient name was erroneously construed as applying only to the "stone hut" used as a seasonal dwelling. Since then, the new meaning has caught on and is now prevalent in touristic literature.

=== In touristic literature ===
An orri is a type of small stone hut found in the Ariège département. Orris are dome-shaped, mortarless huts, often with a top made of slate or wood. Inside they contain just one low room, with half the floor space taken up by a bed made of wood or stone.

Orris were mostly used as night shelters by shepherds and cowherds after sheep and cows were moved to higher ground for grazing in the summer and early autumn. They vary in their arrangements: some appear to stand alone; others are clustered in small groups.

At times, especially among the clustered orris, they were used for other purposes, such as food storage.

== Roussillon orris ==
According to French scholar André Péré, in the Roussillon region orri means "an enclosure surrounded by a dry stone wall in which young lambs or such animals are kept."

The name of the shepherd's hut was barraca in Catalan. 18th-century archival records in French contain mentions of orri and barraque (the Frenchified form of barraca) as in "l'orri avec les barraques qui y sont construites pour la demeure des gardiens" ("the orri together with the barraques which are built in it to serve as abodes for the guardians").

== See also ==
- Vernacular architecture
