= Mela (Bithynia) =

City in Bithynia Secunda, Ancient Rome

Mela was a city and bishopric in the Roman province of Bithynia Secunda. Not a lot is known about its history and it has been identified by historians with either Malagina or Modra.

== History ==
Mela is not mentioned in the list of cities of the Byzantine Empire given in the Synecdemus written by Hierocles in about 530, but it appears in all the subsequent Notitiae Episcopatuum. W.M. Ramsay concluded that the city became the centre of an episcopal see only after that date and, since the account of the participation of the bishop of Mela in the council held at Constantinople in 680 treats the names Mela and Justinianopolis Nova as equivalent, he took it that Mela was (re)founded and raised to a bishopric by Justinian I.

Sophrone Pétridès stated that, as well as Justinianopolis Nova, other names used for Mela were Medrena and Melina. He said that from the 12th century onward we find only Melagina, Melangeia, or Melania, showing that it is the Malagina often mentioned by Byzantine historians as the first large station of the imperial armies in Asia Minor on the road from Constantinople to Dorylaeum, and an important strategic point.

== Association with Modra ==
Ramsay reported that the Notitiae Episcopatuum usually speak of the bishops as "of Modrene, that is, of Mela" (Μοδρηνῆς ἤτοι Μελῆς), showing that the cities of Mela and Modra or Modrene were near enough to each other to form a single bishopric. Pétridès accepted the same identification. However, the expression Μοδρηνῆς ἤτοι Μελῆς appears in only three of the Notitiae Episcopatuum, all three of which are of the 12th century. The Annuario Pontificio 2013 treats Mela and Modra as distinct sees, identifying the city of Mela with ruins near Günükören (perhaps Günüören, Osmaneli), and that of Modra with İnegöl.

== Individual bishops ==
The bishops recorded are:

- Macedonius of Justinianopolis Nova, present at the Council of Constantinople (555);
- Theodorus of Justinianopolis Nova or Mela, present at Constantinople (680);
- Nectarius, or Nicetas of Mela, present at Nicaæa (787);
- Constantius of Mela, present at Constantinople (869);
- Paul of Mela, present at Constantinople (879);
- John of Malagina (1256);
- Constantine of Melangeia (13th century);
- N. of Melaneia (1401).

== See also ==
- Justiniana Nova (disambiguation)
