= Wadi al-Qarn – Burqush Important Bird Area =

Coordinates: 33°28′N 35°59′E

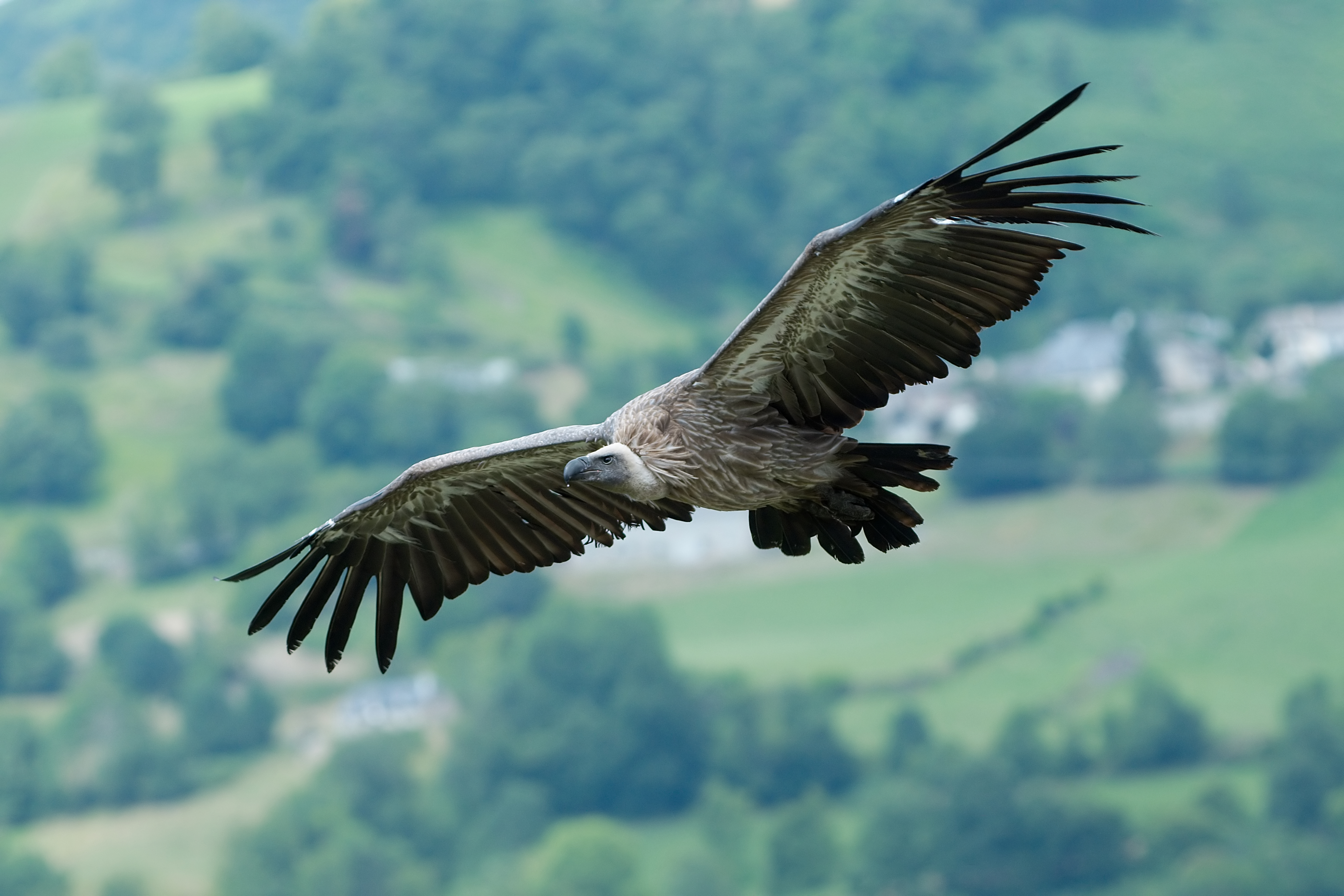
Griffon vultures occur at the site in small numbers

The Wadi al-Qarn – Burqush Important Bird Area is a 4,500 ha site in the Qatana District of south-western Syria. It lies at an altitude of 1,175 – 1,500 m next to the village of Burqush in the Anti-Lebanon Mountains, near Mount Hermon and close to the border with Lebanon. The site includes the steep slope on the northern side of the wadi, the upper parts of which are vertical cliffs overlooking rocky slopes vegetated with scrub, grass and stunted trees. A small reservoir attracts visitors in summer. It has been identified by BirdLife International as an Important Bird Area (IBA).

== Birds ==
Species which triggered the IBA designation include griffon vultures which occur in small numbers, sombre tits, Upcher's warblers, Menetries's warblers, western rock-nuthatches, white-throated robins, Finsch's wheatears, pale rock sparrows and Syrian serins. In winter the reservoir provides habitat for waders and sometimes ducks.
