= Mitato =

Greek term describing a shelter or lodging

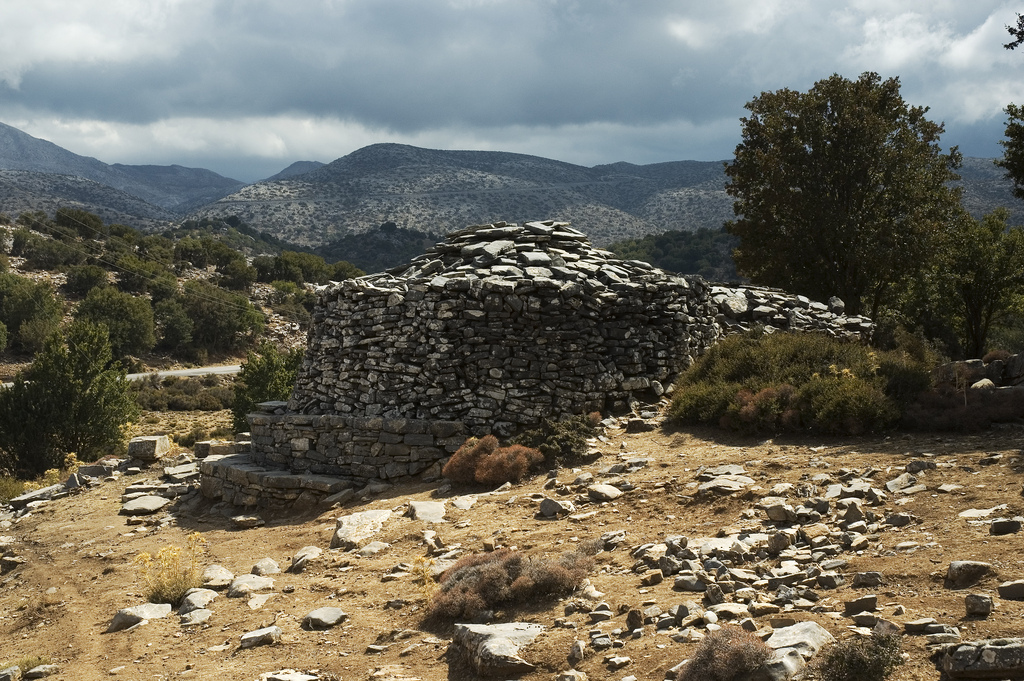
Nida Plateau - Mitata

Mitato (Greek: μιτάτο, archaic form: μιτᾶτον or μητᾶτον, from Latin: metor, "to measure off/to pitch camp") is a term meaning "shelter" or "lodging" in Greek.

Appearing in the 6th century, during the Byzantine period it referred to an inn or trading house for foreign merchants, akin to a caravanserai. By extension, it could also refer to the legal obligation of a private citizen to billet state officials or soldiers. Alternatively, in the 10th century, Constantine Porphyrogenitus uses the term to refer to state-run ranches in Anatolia.

In modern Greece, and especially on the mountains of Crete, a mitato (in the plural mitata) is a hut built from locally gathered stones to provide shelter to shepherds, and is used also for cheese-making. Mount Ida (also called Mount Psiloritis) in central Crete is particularly rich in flat stones suitable for dry stone construction.

== See also ==
- Vernacular architecture
