= Macedonia (region) =

Geographical and historical region in Europe

Coordinates: 41°N 22°E

Macedonia Expand for local names: Maqedonia (Albanian); Македония (Bulgarian); Μακεδονία (Greek); Македонија (Macedonian); Македонија (Serbian)/Makedonija; Machedonia (Aromanian); Machedonia (Megleno Romanian)
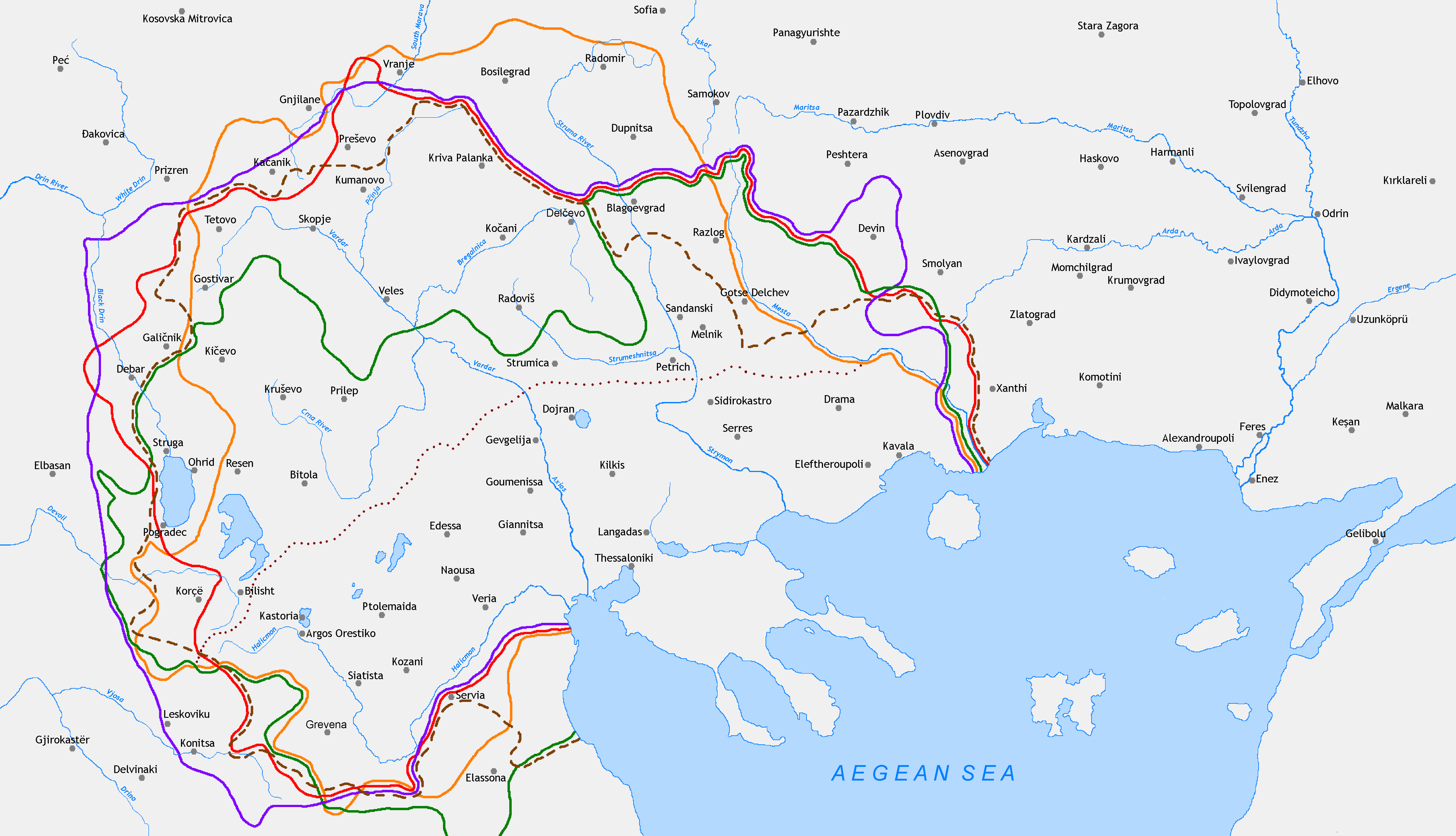
- Borders of the modern region of Macedonia according to different authors (1843–1927)
- Country: Greece; North Macedonia; Bulgaria; Albania; Serbia; Kosovo

Macedonia (/ˌmæsɪˈdoʊniə/ MASS-ih-DOH-nee-ə) is a geographical and historical region of the Balkan Peninsula in Southeast Europe. The modern region at its maximum extent is considered to span the largest part of Northern Greece, known as Greek Macedonia, all of North Macedonia, a large part of southwestern Bulgaria, known as Pirin Macedonia, and small parts of Albania, Serbia, and Kosovo.

In classical antiquity, the kingdom of Macedon rose into an empire under Alexander the Great during the second half of the 4th century BC, signaling the start of the Hellenistic period. In the 2nd century BC Macedonia became a province of the Roman empire. During the medieval period, a Byzantine theme under the name of Macedonia was carved out mostly in Thrace. Macedonia came to be defined by European authors as the modern geographical region by the mid-19th century while under Ottoman rule.

== Etymology ==
Both proper nouns Makedṓn and Makednós are morphologically derived from the Ancient Greek adjective makednós meaning "tall, slim", and are related to the term Macedonia.

== Boundaries and Terminology ==
Prior to its expansion under Philip II, the ancient kingdom of Macedonia, to which the modern region owes its name, lay within the central and western parts of the current Greek province of Macedonia. The Roman province of Macedonia consisted of what is today northern and central Greece, much of the geographical area of the Republic of North Macedonia and southeast Albania. In late Roman times, the provincial boundaries were reorganized to form the Diocese of Macedonia, consisting of most of modern mainland Greece, Crete, southern Albania, southwest Bulgaria, and most of Republic of North Macedonia.

In the Byzantine Empire, a province under the name of Macedonia was carved out of the original Theme of Thrace, which was well east of the Struma River. This thema variously included parts of Thrace and gave its name to the Macedonian dynasty. Hence, Byzantine documents of this era that mention Macedonia are most probably referring to the Macedonian theme. The parts of Macedonia, on the other hand, which were ruled by the First Bulgarian Empire throughout the 9th and the 10th century, were incorporated into the Byzantine Empire in 1018 as the Themе of Bulgaria. With the gradual conquest of southeastern Europe by the Ottomans in the late 14th century, the name of Macedonia disappeared as an administrative designation for several centuries and was rarely displayed on maps.

The name was again revived to mean a distinct geographical region in the 19th century, defining the region bounded by Mount Olympus, the Pindus range, mounts Shar and Osogovo, the western Rhodopes, the lower course of the river Mesta (Greek Nestos) and the Aegean Sea, developing roughly the same borders that it has today.

== History ==
=== Neolithic period ===
While Macedonia shows signs of human habitation as old as the Paleolithic period (among which is the Petralona cave with the oldest European humanoid), the earliest known settlements, such as Nea Nikomedeia in Imathia (today's Greek Macedonia), date back 9,000 years. The houses at Nea Nikomedeia were constructed—as were most structures throughout the Neolithic in northern Greece—of wattle and daub on a timber frame. The cultural assemblage includes well-made pottery in simple shapes with occasional decoration in white on a red background, clay female figurines of the 'rod-headed' type known from Thessaly to the Danube Valley, stone axes and adzes, chert blades, and ornaments of stone including curious 'nose plugs' of uncertain function. The assemblage of associated objects differs from one house to the next, suggesting some degree of craft specialisation had already been established from the beginning of the site's history. The farming economy was based on the cultivation of cereal crops such as wheat and barley and pulses and on the herding of sheep and goats, with some cattle and pigs. Hunting played a relatively minor role in the economy. Surviving from 7000 to 5500 BCE, this Early Neolithic settlement was occupied for over a thousand years.

The Middle Neolithic period (c. 5500 to 4500 BCE) is at present best represented at Servia in the Haliacmon Valley in western Macedonia, where the typical red-on-cream pottery in the Sesklo style emphasises the settlement's southern orientation. Pottery of this date has been found at a number of sites in Central and Eastern Macedonia but so far none has been extensively excavated.

The Late Neolithic period (c. 4500 to 3500 BCE) is well represented by both excavated and unexcavated sites throughout the region (though in Eastern Macedonia levels of this period are still called Middle Neolithic according to the terminology used in the Balkans). Rapid changes in pottery styles, and the discovery of fragments of pottery showing trade with quite distant regions, indicate that society, economy and technology were all changing rapidly. Among the most important of these changes were the start of copper working, convincingly demonstrated by Renfrew to have been learnt from the cultural groups of Bulgaria and Roumania to the North. Principal excavated settlements of this period include Makryialos and Paliambela near the western shore of the Thermaic gulf, Thermi to the south of Thessaloniki and Sitagroi and Dikili Tas in the Drama plain. Some of these sites were densely occupied and formed large mounds (known to the local inhabitants of the region today as 'toumbas'). Others were much less densely occupied and spread for as much as a kilometer (Makryialos). Both types are found at the same time in the same districts and it is presumed that differences in social organisation are reflected by these differences in settlement organisation. Some communities were clearly concerned to protect themselves with different kinds of defensive arrangements: ditches at Makryialos and concentric walls at Paliambela. The best preserved buildings were discovered at Dikili Tas, where long timber-framed structures had been organised in rows and some had been decorated with bulls' skulls fastened to the outside of the walls and plastered over with clay.

Remarkable evidence for cult activity has been found at Promachonas-Topolnica, which straddles the Greek Bulgarian border to the north of Serres. Here a deep pit appeared to have been roofed to make a subterranean room; in it were successive layers of debris including large numbers of figurines, bulls' skulls, and pottery, including several rare and unusual shapes.

The farming economy of this period continued the practices established at the beginning of the Neolithic, although sheep and goats were less dominant among the animals than they had previously been, and the cultivation of vines (Vitis vinifera) is well attested.

Only a few burials have been discovered from the whole of the Neolithic period in northern Greece and no clear pattern can be deduced. Grave offerings, however, seem to have been very limited.

=== History from the 7th century BC to Roman conquest ===
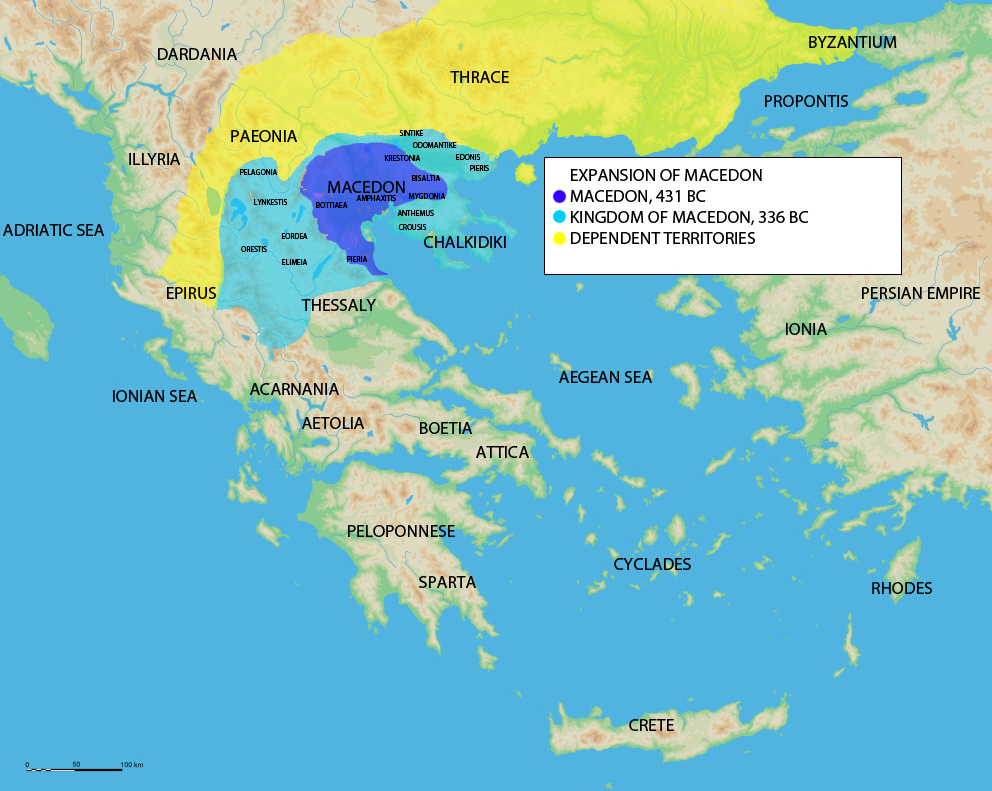
Expansion of the kingdom of Macedon

In classical times, the modern region of Macedonia comprised parts of what at the time was known as Lower Macedonia, Upper Macedonia, Paionia, Illyria and Thrace. Among others, in its lands were located the kingdom of Macedon, the kingdom of Paeonia and historical tribes like the Agrianes, Pelagonia and part of Dardania, the Chalcidian League and other Greek colonies like Amphipolis. Prior to the Macedonian ascendancy, parts of southern Macedonia were populated by the Bryges, while western, (i. e., Upper) Macedonia, was inhabited by Macedonian and Illyrian tribes. Whilst numerous wars are later recorded between the Illyrian and Macedonian Kingdoms, the Bryges might have co-existed peacefully with the Macedonians. In the time of Archaic Greece, Paeonia, whose exact boundaries are obscure, originally included the whole Axius river valley and the surrounding areas, in what is now the northern part of the Greek region of Macedonia, most of the Republic of North Macedonia, and a small part of western Bulgaria.

==== Expansion of the kingdom of Macedon ====
Prior to its expansion under Philip II, the ancient kingdom of Macedonia, to which the modern region owes its name, lay entirely within the central and western parts of the current Greek province of Macedonia.

By 500 BCE, the ancient kingdom of Macedon was centered somewhere between the southern slopes of Lower Olympus and the lowest reach of the Haliakmon river. Since 512/511 BCE, the kingdom of Macedonia was subject to the Persians, but after the battle of Plataia it regained its independence. Under Philip II and Alexander the Great, Macedon forcefully expanded in the wider region. Alexander's conquests produced a lasting extension of Hellenistic culture and thought across the ancient Near East, but his empire broke up on his death. His generals divided the empire between them, founding their own states and dynasties. The kingdom of Macedon was taken by Cassander, who ruled it until his death in 297 BC. At the time, Macedonian control over the Thracian and Illyrian states of the region slowly waned, although the kingdom of Macedonia remained the most potent regional power. This period also saw several Celtic invasions into the Balkans. However, the Celts were successfully repelled by Antigonus Gonatas, leaving little overall influence on the region.

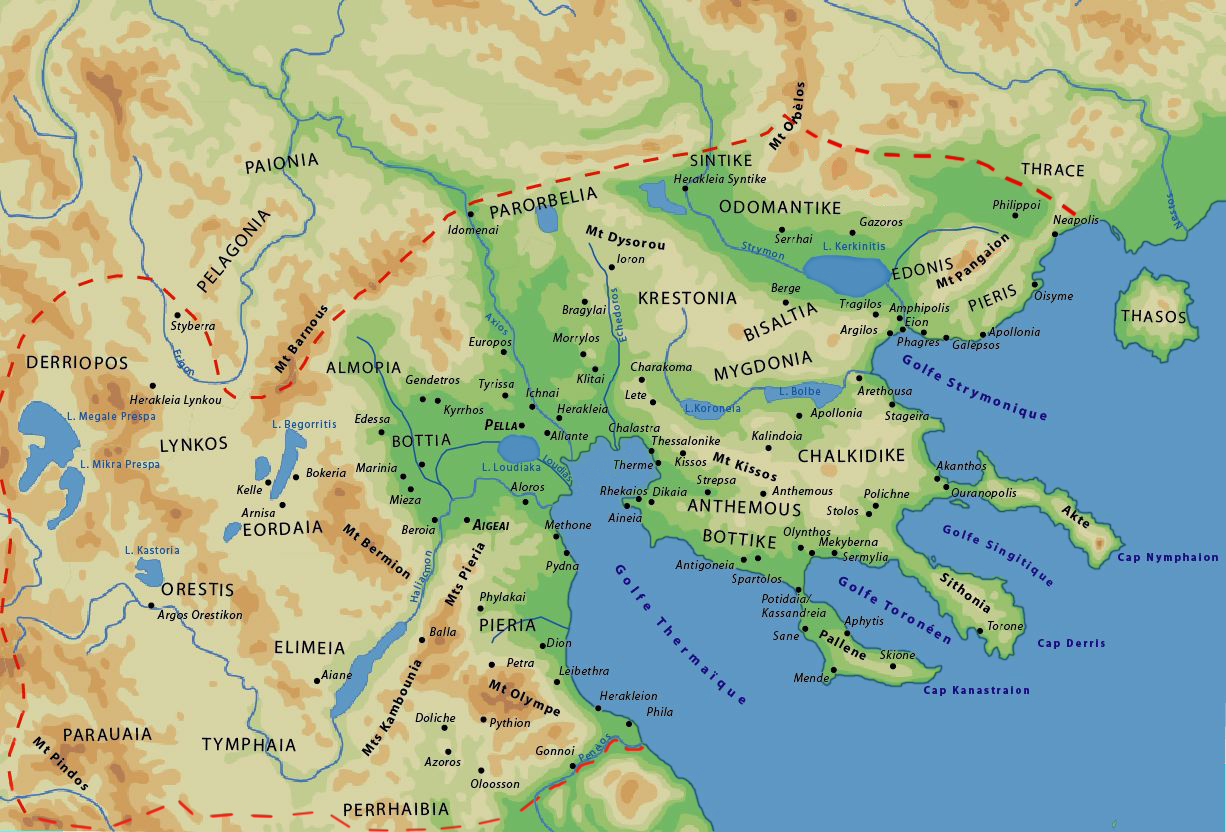
The kingdom of Macedon with its provinces

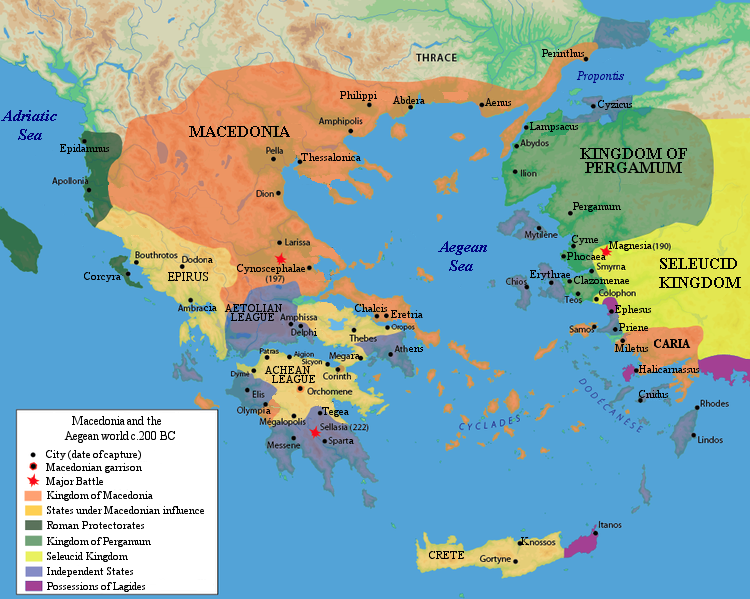
The Kingdom of Macedonia (orange) under Philip V (r. 221–179 BC), with Macedonian dependent states (dark yellow)

Expansion of Kingdom of Macedon:

1. Early Argead kingdom (founded by Perdiccas I): Argead Macedonian kingdom of Lower Macedonia consisting of six districts Emathia, Pieria, Bottiaea, Mygdonia, Eordaea and Almopia. Its capital was Aigai.
2. Kingdom of Alexander I: All the above districts plus the regions of Crestonia, Bisaltia to the east annexed and the western regions of Elimiotis, Orestis and Lynkestis as subjects or allies of the Argeads. Its capital was Aigai.
3. Kingdom of Philip II: All the above provinces plus the appendages of Pelagonia and southern parts of Paeonia (known as Macedonian Paeonia) to the north, Sintike, Odomantis and Edonis to the east and the Chalkidike to the south. Its capital was Pella. At the end of his expansion campaigns, Philip had also established Macedon's hegemony over Thessaly and the League of Corinth and most of the Balkans, including Paeonia, parts of Illyria and Odrysian kingdom in Ancient Thrace.
4. In 200 BC, the Antigonid kingdom of Macedonia included most of the modern region, as well as other regions like Thessaly, coastal Thrace, Euboea and many other Aegean Islands, parts of Illyria, Caria. However, the northern part of North Macedonia, including Skopje, was part of Dardania.

=== Roman province of Macedonia (146 BC–395 AD) ===
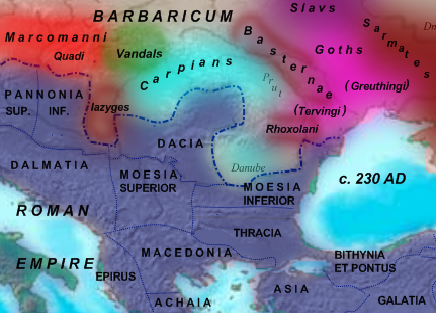
Roman provinces in the Balkans including Macedonia, c. 200 AD

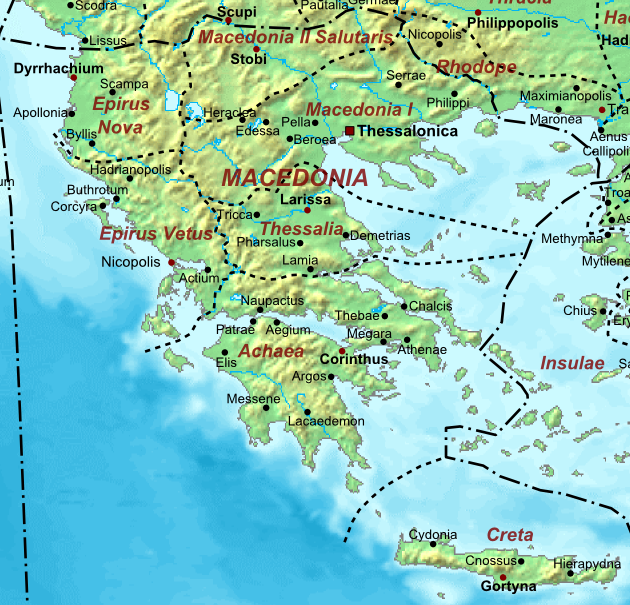
The late Roman Diocese of Macedonia, including the provinces of Macedonia Prima, Macedonia Secunda or Salutaris (periodically abolished), Thessalia, Epirus vetus, Epirus nova, Achaea, and Crete.

Macedonian sovereignty in the region was brought to an end at the hands of the rising power of Rome in the 2nd century BC. Philip V of Macedon took his kingdom to war against the Romans in two wars during his reign (221–179 BC). The First Macedonian War (215–205 BC) was fairly successful for the Macedonians but Philip was decisively defeated in the Second Macedonian War in (200–197 BC). Although he survived war with Rome, his successor Perseus of Macedon (reigned 179–168 BC) did not; having taken Macedon into the Third Macedonian War in (171–168 BC), he lost his kingdom when he was defeated. Macedonia was initially divided into four districts subject to Rome before finally being annexed in 146 BC as a Roman province. Around this time, vulgar Latin was introduced in the Balkans by Latin-speaking colonists and military personnel. With the division of the Roman Empire into west and east in 298 AD, Macedonia came under the rule of Rome's Byzantine successors. The population of the entire region was, however, depleted by destructive invasions of various Gothic and Hun tribes c. 300 – 5th century AD. Despite this, other parts of the Byzantine empire continued to flourish, in particular some coastal cities such as Thessaloniki became important trade and cultural centres.

=== Macedonia contested between Byzantine, Bulgarian, Latin and Serbian Empires ===
Despite the Byzantine empire's power, from the beginning of the 6th century the Byzantine dominions were subject to frequent raids by various Slavic tribes which, in the course of centuries, eventually resulted in drastic demographic and cultural changes in the Empire's Balkan provinces. Although traditional scholarship attributes these changes to large-scale colonizations by Slavic-speaking groups, it has been proposed that a generalized dissipation of Roman identity might have commenced in the 3rd century, especially among rural provincials who were crippled by harsh taxation and famines. Given this background, penetrations carried by successive waves of relatively small numbers of Slavic warriors and their families might have been capable of assimilating large numbers of indigenes into their cultural model, which was sometimes seen as a more attractive alternative. In this way and in the course of time, great parts of Macedonia came to be controlled by Slavic-speaking communities. Despite numerous attacks on Thessaloniki, the city held out, and Byzantine-Roman culture continued to flourish, although Slavic cultural influence steadily increased.

The Slavic settlements organized themselves along tribal and territorially based lines which were referred to by Byzantine Greek historians as "Sklaviniai". The Sklaviniai continued to intermittently assault the Byzantine Empire, either independently, or aided by Bulgar or Avar contingents. Around 680 AD a "Bulgar" group (which was largely composed of the descendants of former Roman Christians taken captive by the Avars), led by Khan Kuber (theorized to have belonged to the same clan as the Danubian Bulgarian khan Asparukh), settled in the Pelagonian plain, and launched campaigns to the region of Thessaloniki. When the Empire could spare imperial troops, it attempted to regain control of its lost Balkan territories. By the time of Constans II a significant number of the Slavs of Macedonia were captured and transferred to central Asia Minor where they were forced to recognize the authority of the Byzantine emperor and serve in his ranks. In the late 7th century, Justinian II again organized a massive expedition against the Sklaviniai and Bulgars of Macedonia. Launching from Constantinople, he subdued many Slavic tribes and established the Theme of Thrace in the hinterland of the Great City, and pushed on into Thessaloniki. However, on his return he was ambushed by the Slavo-Bulgars of Kuber, losing a great part of his army, booty, and subsequently his throne. Despite these temporary successes, rule in the region was far from stable since not all of the Sklaviniae were pacified, and those that were often rebelled. The emperors rather resorted to withdrawing their defensive line south along the Aegean coast, until the late 8th century. Although a new theme—that of "Macedonia"—was subsequently created, it did not correspond to today's geographic territory, but one farther east (centred on Adrianople), carved out of the already existing Thracian and Helladic themes.

There are no Byzantine records of "Sklaviniai" after 836/837 as they were absorbed into the expanding First Bulgarian Empire. Slavic influence in the region strengthened along with the rise of this state, which incorporated parts of the region to its domain in 837. In the early 860s Saints Cyril and Methodius, two Byzantine Greek brothers from Thessaloniki, created the first Slavic Glagolitic alphabet in which the Old Church Slavonic language was first transcribed, and are thus commonly referred to as the apostles of the Slavic world. Their cultural heritage was acquired and developed in medieval Bulgaria, where after 885 the region of Ohrid (present-day Republic of North Macedonia) became a significant ecclesiastical center with the nomination of the Saint Clement of Ohrid for "first archbishop in Bulgarian language" with residence in this region. In conjunction with another disciple of Saints Cyril and Methodius, Saint Naum, Clement created a flourishing Slavic cultural center around Ohrid, where pupils were taught theology in the Old Church Slavonic language and the Glagolitic and Cyrillic script at what is now called Ohrid Literary School. The Bulgarian-Byzantine boundary in the beginning of 10th century passed approximately 20 km (12 mi) north of Thessaloniki according to the inscription of Narash. According to the Byzantine author John Kaminiates, at that time the neighbouring settlements around Thessaloniki were inhabited by "Scythians" (Bulgarians) and the Slavic tribes of Drugubites and Sagudates, in addition to Greeks.

At the end of the 10th century, what is now the Republic of North Macedonia became the political and cultural heartland of the First Bulgarian Empire, after Byzantine emperors John I Tzimiskes conquered the eastern part of the Bulgarian state during the Rus'–Byzantine War of 970–971. The Bulgarian capital Preslav and the Bulgarian Tsar Boris II were captured, and with the deposition of the Bulgarian regalia in the Hagia Sophia, Bulgaria was officially annexed to Byzantium. A new capital was established at Ohrid, which also became the seat of the Bulgarian Patriarchate. A new dynasty, that of the Comitopuli under Tsar Samuil and his successors, continued resistance against the Byzantines for several more decades, before also succumbing in 1018. The western part of Bulgaria including Macedonia was incorporated into the Byzantine Empire as the province of Bulgaria (Theme of Bulgaria) and the Bulgarian Patriarchate was reduced in rank to an Archbishopric. With the Byzantine conquest of the former Bulgarian territories, several new administrative divisions (Themes) were created. The mentioned subdivisions in Macedonia were the following: 1. Voleron, Strymon and Thessalonica (grouped together), 2. Zagoria, 3. Veria, 4. Servia, 5. Stromnitsa, 6. Malesovo and Morovisdon, 7. Prilep and Pelagonia, Moliskos and Moglena, 8. Achrida, 9. Skopje, 10. Prespa, 11. Deabolis and 12. Kastoria.

Intermittent Bulgarian uprisings continued to occur, often with the support of the Serbian princedoms to the north. Any temporary independence that might have been gained was usually crushed swiftly by the Byzantines. It was also marked by periods of war between the Normans and Byzantium. The Normans launched offensives from their lands acquired in southern Italy, and temporarily gained rule over small areas in the northwestern coast.

At the end of the 12th century, some northern parts of Macedonia were temporarily conquered by Stefan Nemanja of Serbia. In the 13th century, following the Fourth Crusade, Macedonia was disputed among Byzantine Greeks, Latin crusaders of the short-lived Kingdom of Thessalonica, and the revived Bulgarian state. Most of southern Macedonia was secured by the Despotate of Epirus and then by the Empire of Nicaea, while the north was ruled by Bulgaria. After 1261 however, all of Macedonia returned to Byzantine rule, where it largely remained until the Byzantine civil war of 1341–1347. Taking advantage of this conflict, the Serb ruler Stefan Dushan expanded his realm and founded the Serbian Empire, which included all of Macedonia, northern and central Greece – excluding Thessaloniki, Athens and the Peloponnese. Dushan's empire however broke up shortly after his death in 1355. After his death local rulers in the regions of Macedonia were despot Jovan Uglješa in eastern Macedonia, and kings Vukašin Mrnjavčević and his son Marko Mrnjavčević in western regions of Macedonia.

=== Macedonia under the Ottoman Empire ===
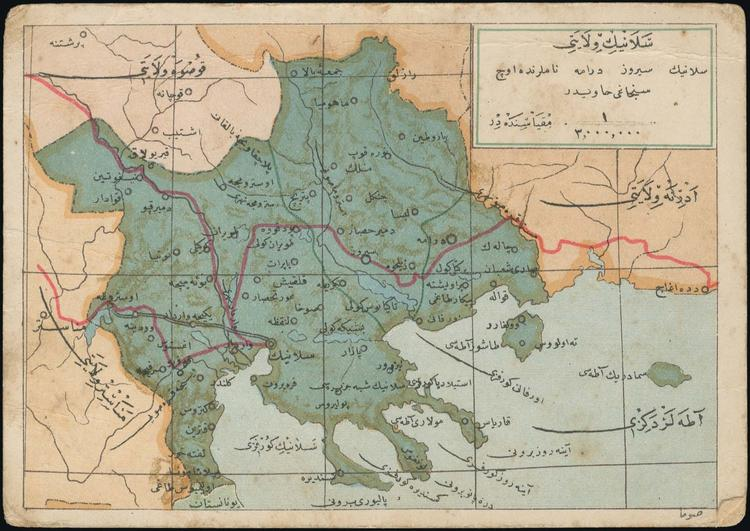
Contemporary Ottoman map or the Salonica Vilayet

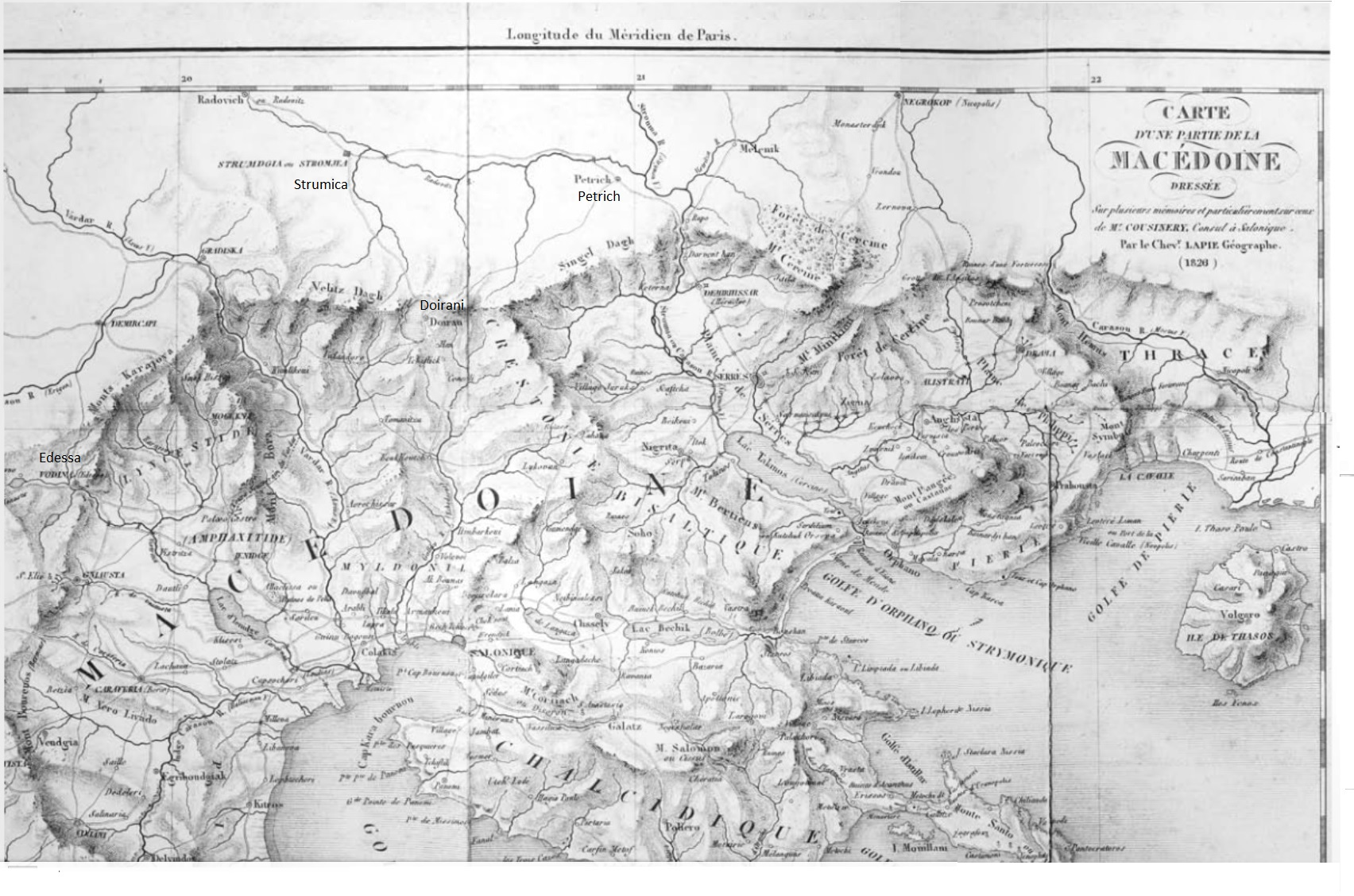
Map of Part of Macedonia (Carte d'une partie de la Macedoine) by Piere Lapie (1826).

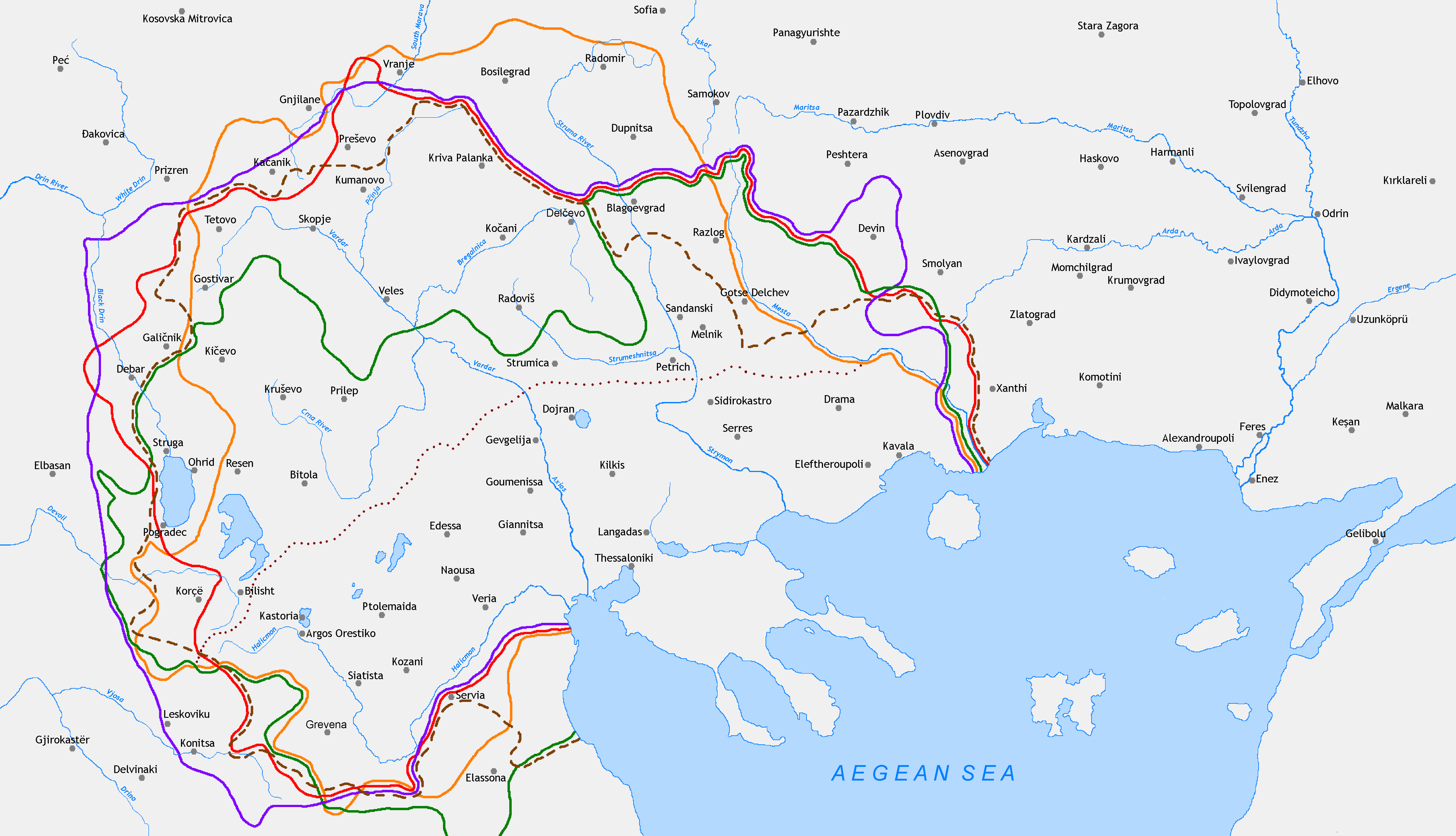
Borders of Macedonia, based on the Roman province, according to different authors (1843–1927)

Since the middle of the 14th century, the Ottoman threat was looming in the Balkans, as the Ottomans defeated the various Christian principalities, whether Serb, Bulgarian or Greek. After the Ottoman victory in the Battle of Maritsa in 1371, most of Macedonia accepted vassalage to the Ottomans and by the end of the 14th century the Ottoman Empire gradually annexed the region. The final Ottoman capture of Thessalonica (1430) was seen as the prelude to the fall of Constantinople itself. Macedonia remained a part of the Ottoman Empire for nearly 500 years, during which time it gained a substantial Turkish minority. Thessaloniki later become the home of a large Sephardi Jewish population following the expulsions of Jews after 1492 from Spain.

Over the centuries Macedonia had become a multicultural region. The historical references mention Greeks, Bulgarians, Turks, Albanians, Gypsies, Jews, Aromanians and Megleno-Romanians. It is often claimed that macédoine, the fruit or vegetable salad, was named after the area's very mixed population, as it could be witnessed at the end of the 19th century. From the Middle Ages to the early 20th century the Slavic-speaking population in Macedonia was identified mostly as Bulgarian.

=== Macedonian identities and Rise of nationalism in the Ottoman Empire ===
During the period of Bulgarian National Revival many Bulgarians from these regions supported the struggle for creation of Bulgarian cultural educational and religious institutions, including Bulgarian Exarchate. Eventually, in the 20th century, 'Bulgarians' came to be understood as synonymous with 'Macedonian Slavs' and, eventually, 'ethnic Macedonians'. Krste Misirkov, a philologist and publicist, wrote his work "On the Macedonian Matters" (1903), for which he is heralded by Macedonians as one of the founders of the Macedonian nation.

After the revival of Greek, Serbian, and Bulgarian statehood in the 19th century, the Ottoman lands in Europe that became identified as "Macedonia", were contested by all three governments, leading to the creation in the 1890s and 1900s of rival armed groups who divided their efforts between fighting the Turks and one another. The most important of these was the Internal Macedonian Revolutionary Organization, which organized the so-called Ilinden-Preobrazhenie Uprising in 1903, fighting for an autonomous or independent Macedonian state, and the Greek efforts from 1904 until 1908 (Greek Struggle for Macedonia). Diplomatic intervention by the European powers led to plans for an autonomous Macedonia under Ottoman rule.

Evolution of the territory of Greece. The 'Macedonia' shown is the Greek province.

The restricted borders of the modern Greek state at its inception in 1830 disappointed the inhabitants of northern Greece (Epirus and Macedonia). Addressing these concerns in 1844, the Greek Prime Minister Kolettis addressed the constitutional assembly in Athens that "the Kingdom of Greece is not Greece; it is only a part, the smallest and poorest, of Greece. The Greek is not only he who inhabits the kingdom, but also he who lives in Ioannina, or Thessaloniki, or Serres, or Odrin" . He mentions cities and islands that were under Ottoman possession as composing the Great Idea (Greek: Μεγάλη Ιδέα, Megáli Idéa) which meant the reconstruction of the classical Greek world or the revival of the Byzantine Empire. The important idea here is that for Greece, Macedonia was a region with large Greek populations expecting annexation to the new Greek state.

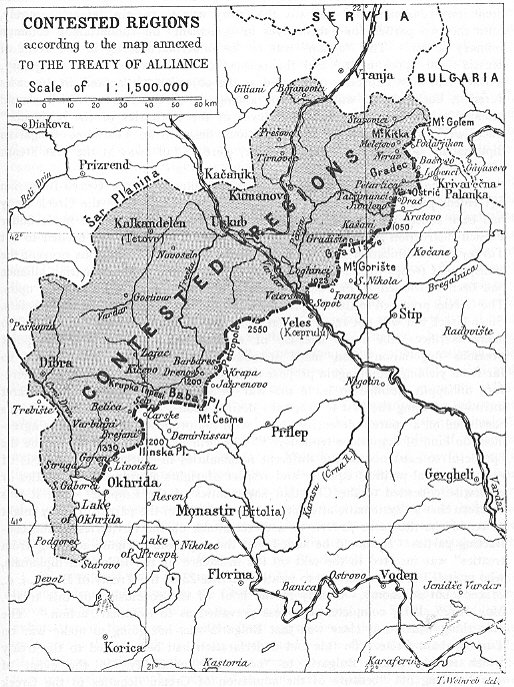
Map of the region contested by Serbia and Bulgaria and subject to the arbitration of the Russian Tsar

The 1878 Congress of Berlin changed the Balkan map again. The treaty restored Macedonia and Thrace to the Ottoman Empire. Serbia, Romania and Montenegro were granted full independence, and some territorial expansion at the expense of the Ottoman Empire. Russia would maintain military advisors in Bulgaria and Eastern Rumelia until May 1879. Austria-Hungary was permitted to occupy Bosnia, Herzegovina and the Sanjak of Novi Pazar. The Congress of Berlin also forced Bulgaria, newly given autonomy by the 1878 Treaty of San Stefano, to return over half of its newly gained territory to the Ottoman Empire. This included Macedonia, a large part of which was given to Bulgaria, due to Russian pressure and the presence of significant numbers of Bulgarians and adherents to the Bulgarian Exarchate. The territorial losses dissatisfied Bulgaria; this fuelled the ambitions of many Bulgarian politicians for the following seventy years, who wanted to review the treaty – by peaceful or military means and to reunite all lands which they claimed had a Bulgarian majority. Besides, Serbia was now interested in the Macedonian lands, until then only Greece was Bulgaria's main contender, which after the addition of Thessaly to Greece in (1881) was bordering Macedonia. Thus, the Berlin Congress renewed the struggle for Turkey in Europe, including the so-called Macedonia region, rather than setting up a permanent regime. In the following years, all of the neighboring states struggled over Turkey in Europe; they were only kept at bay by their own restraints, the Ottoman Army and the territorial ambitions of the Great Powers in the region.

Serbian policy had a distinct anti-Bulgarian flavor, attempting to prevent the Bulgarian influencing the inhabitants of Macedonia. On the other hand, Bulgaria was using the power of its religious institutions (Bulgarian Exarchate established in 1870) to promote its language and make more people identify with Bulgaria. Greece, in addition, was in an advantageous position for protecting its interests through the influence of Patriarchate of Constantinople which traditionally sponsored Greek-language and Greek-culture schools also in villages with few Greeks. This put the Patriarchate in dispute with the Exarchate, which established schools with Bulgarian education. Indeed, belonging to one or another institution could define a person's national identity. Simply, if a person supported the Patriarchate they were regarded as Greek, whereas if they supported the Exarchate they were regarded as Bulgarian. Locally, however, villagers were not always able to express freely their association with one or the other institution as there were numerous armed groups trying to defend and/or expand the territory of each. Some were locally recruited and self-organized while others were sent and armed by the protecting states.

The aim of the adversaries, however, was not primarily to extend their influence over Macedonia but merely to prevent Macedonia succumbing to the influence of the other. This often violent attempt to persuade the people that they belonged to one ethnic group or another pushed some people to reject both. The severe pressure on the peaceful peasants of Macedonia worked against the plans of the Serbians and Bulgarians to make them adopt their ethnic idea and eventually a social divide became apparent. The British Ambassador in Belgrade in 1927 said: "At present the unfortunate Macedonian peasant is between the hammer and the anvil. One day 'comitadjis' come to his house and demand under threat lodging, food and money and the next day the gendarm hales him off to prison for having given them; the Macedonian is really a peaceable, fairly industrious agriculturist and if the (Serbian) government give him adequate protection, education, freedom from malaria and decent communications, there seems no reason why he should not become just as Serbian in sentiment as he was Bulgarian 10 years ago". As a result of this game of tug-of-war, the development of a distinct Macedonian national identity was impeded and delayed. Moreover, when the imperialistic plans of the surrounding states made possible the division of Macedonia, some Macedonian intellectuals such as Misirkov mentioned the necessity of creating a Macedonian national identity which would distinguish the Macedonian Slavs from Bulgarians, Serbians or Greeks.

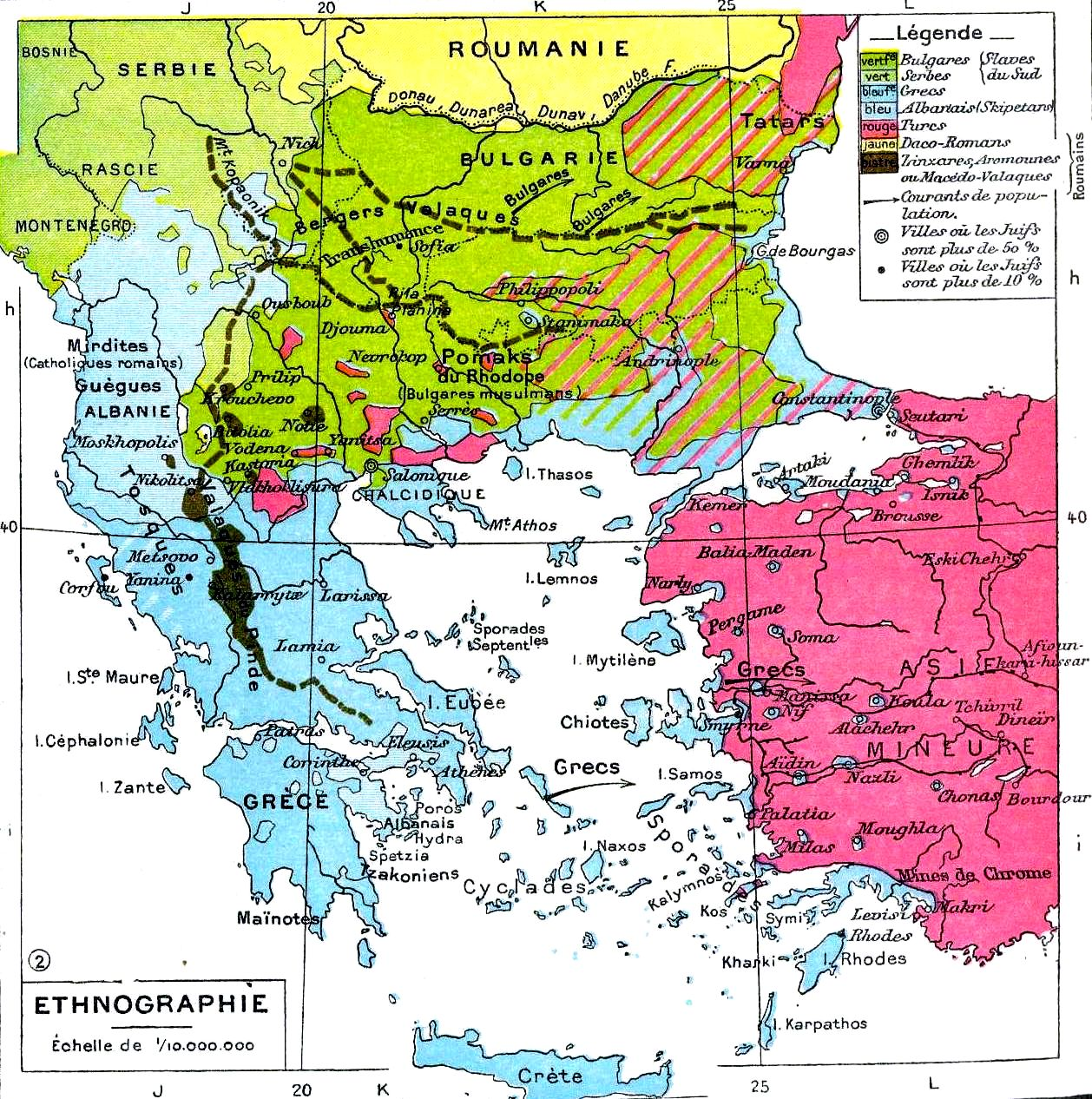
Ethnic composition of the Balkans according to Atlas Général Vidal-Lablanche, Paris 1890–1894. Henry Robert Wilkinson stated that this ethnic map, as most ethnic maps of that time, contained a pro-Bulgarian ethnographic view of Macedonia.

Baptizing Macedonian Slavs as Serbian or Bulgarian aimed therefore to justify these countries' territorial claims over Macedonia. The Greek side, with the assistance of the Patriarchate that was responsible for the schools, could more easily maintain control, because they were spreading Greek identity. For the very same reason the Bulgarians, when preparing the Exarchate's government (1871) included Macedonians in the assembly as "brothers" to prevent any ethnic diversification. On the other hand, the Serbs, unable to establish Serbian-speaking schools, used propaganda. Their main concern was to prevent the Slavic-speaking Macedonians from acquiring Bulgarian identity through concentrating on the myth of the ancient origins of the Macedonians and simultaneously by the classification of Bulgarians as Tatars and not as Slavs, emphasizing their 'Macedonian' characteristics as an intermediate stage between Serbs and Bulgarians. To sum up the Serbian propaganda attempted to inspire the Macedonians with a separate ethnic identity to diminish the Bulgarian influence. This choice was the 'Macedonian ethnicity'. The Bulgarians never accepted an ethnic diversity from the Slav Macedonians, giving geographic meaning to the term. In 1893 they established the Internal Macedonian Revolutionary Organization (VMRO) aiming to confront the Serbian and Greek action in Macedonia. VMRO hoped to answer the Macedonian question through a revolutionary movement, and so they instigated the Ilinden Uprising (1903) to release some Ottoman territory. Bulgaria used this to internationalize the Macedonian question. Ilinden changed Greece's stance which decided to take Para-military action. In order to protect the Greek Macedonians and Greek interests, Greece sent officers to train guerrillas and organize militias (Macedonian Struggle), known as makedonomahi (Macedonian fighters), essentially to fight the Bulgarians. After that it was obvious that the Macedonian question could be answered only with a war.

The rise of the Albanian and the Turkish nationalism after 1908, however, prompted Greece, Serbia and Bulgaria to bury their differences with regard to Macedonia and to form a joint coalition against the Ottoman Empire in 1912. Disregarding public opinion in Bulgaria, which was in support of the establishment of an autonomous Macedonian province under a Christian governor, the Bulgarian government entered a pre-war treaty with Serbia which divided the region into two parts. The part of Macedonia west and north of the line of partition was contested by both Serbia and Bulgaria and was subject to the arbitration of the Russian Tsar after the war. Serbia formally renounced any claims to the part of Macedonia south and east of the line, which was declared to be within the Bulgarian sphere of interest. The pre-treaty between Greece and Bulgaria, however, did not include any agreement on the division of the conquered territories – evidently both countries hoped to occupy as much territory as possible having their sights primarily set on Thessaloniki.

=== Balkan Wars and World War I ===
==== Balkan Wars ====
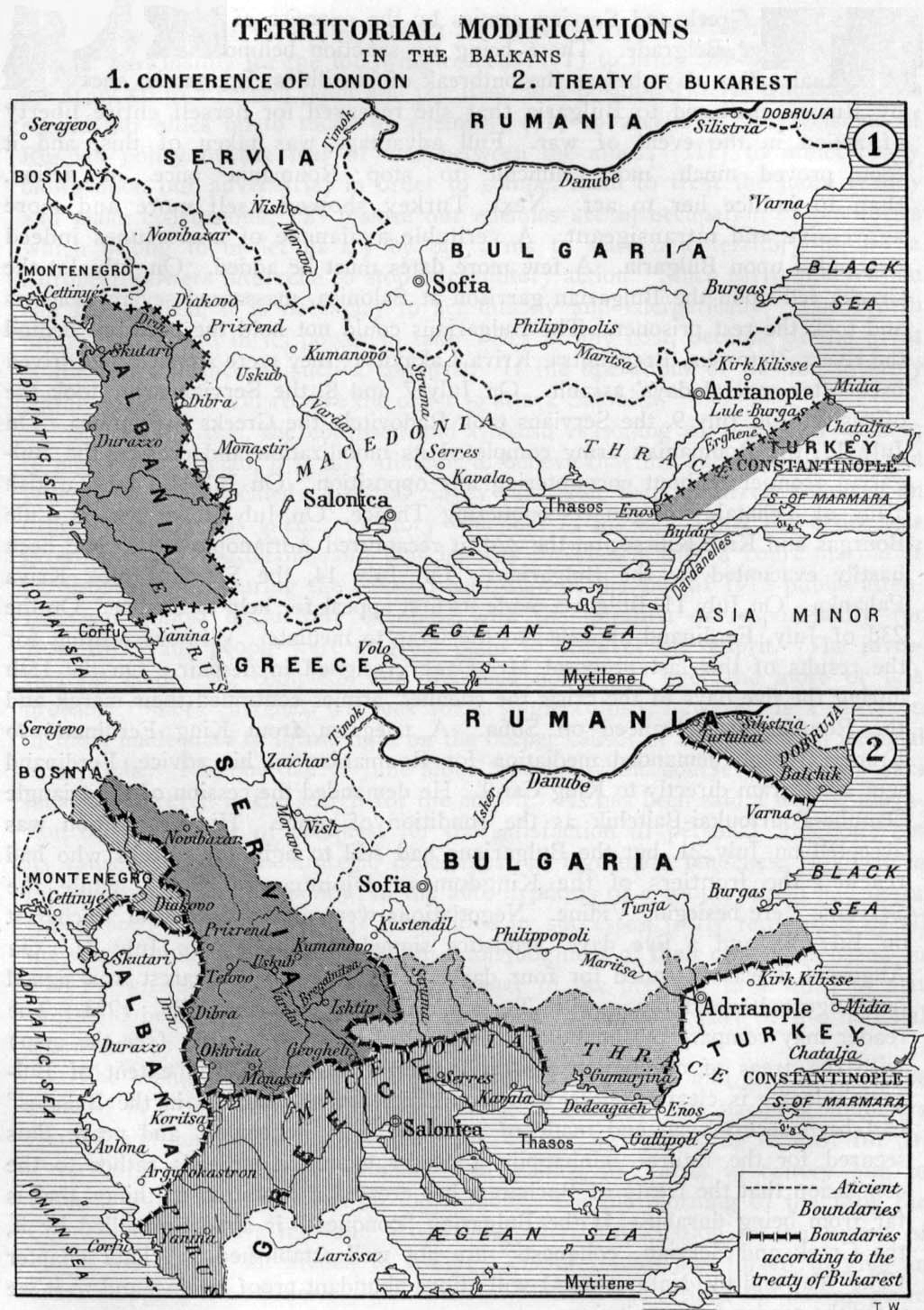
Boundaries on the Balkans after the First and the Second Balkan War (1912–1913)

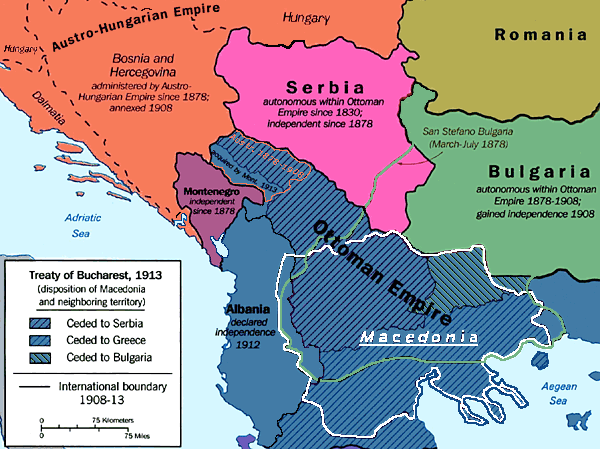
Macedonia's division in 1913

The imminent collapse of the Ottoman Empire was welcomed by the Balkan states, as it promised to restore their European territory. The Young Turk Revolution of 1908 proved a nationalistic movement thwarting the peoples' expectations of the empire's modernization and hastened the end of the Ottoman occupation of the Balkans. To this end, an alliance was struck among the Balkan states in Spring 1913. The First Balkan War, which lasted six weeks, commenced in August 1912, when Montenegro declared war on the Ottoman Empire, whose forces ultimately engaged four different wars in Thrace, Macedonia, Northern and Southern Albania and Kosovo. The Macedonian campaign was fought in atrocious conditions. The retreat of the Ottoman army from Macedonia succeeded the desperate effort of the Greek and Bulgarian forces to reach the city of Thessalonica, the "single prize of the first Balkan War" for whose status no prior agreements were done. In this case possession would be equal to acquisition. The Greek forces entered the city first liberating officially, a progress only positive for them. Glenny says: "for the Greeks it was a good war".

In the First Balkan War, Bulgaria, Serbia, Greece and Montenegro occupied almost all Ottoman-held territories in Europe. Bulgaria bore the brunt of the war fighting on the Thracian front against the main Ottoman forces. Both her war expenditures and casualties in the First Balkan War were higher than those of Serbia, Greece and Montenegro combined. Macedonia itself was occupied by Greek, Serbian and Bulgarian forces. The Ottoman Empire in the Treaty of London in May 1913 assigned the whole of Macedonia to the Balkan League, without, specifying the division of the region, to promote problems between the allies. Dissatisfied with the creation of an autonomous Albanian state, which denied her access to the Adriatic, Serbia asked for the suspension of the pre-war division treaty and demanded from Bulgaria greater territorial concessions in Macedonia. Later in May the same year, Greece and Serbia signed a secret treaty in Thessaloniki stipulating the division of Macedonia according to the existing lines of control. Both Serbia and Greece, as well as Bulgaria, started to prepare for a final war of partition.

In June 1913, Bulgarian Tsar Ferdinand, without consulting the government, and without any declaration of war, ordered Bulgarian troops to attack the Greek and Serbian troops in Macedonia, initiating the Second Balkan War. The Bulgarian army was in full retreat in all fronts. The Serbian army chose to stop its operations when achieved all its territorial goals and only then the Bulgarian army took a breath. During the last two days the Bulgarians managed to achieve a defensive victory against the advancing Greek army in the Kresna Gorge. However at the same time the Romanian army crossed the undefended northern border and easily advanced towards Sofia. Romania interfered in the war, in order to satisfy its territorial claims against Bulgaria. The Ottoman Empire also interfered, easily reassuming control of Eastern Thrace with Edirne. The Second Balkan War, also known as Inter-Ally War, left Bulgaria only with the Struma valley and a small part of Thrace with minor ports at the Aegean sea. Vardar Macedonia was incorporated into Serbia and thereafter referred to as South Serbia. Southern (Aegean) Macedonia was incorporated into Greece and thereafter was referred to as northern Greece. The region suffered heavily during the Second Balkan War. During its advance at the end of June, the Greek army set fire to the Bulgarian quarter of the town of Kilkis and over 160 villages around Kilkis and Serres driving some 50,000 refugees into Bulgaria proper. The Bulgarian army retaliated by burning the Greek quarter of Serres and by arming Muslims from the region of Drama which led to a massacre of Greek civilians.

In September 1915, the Greek government authorized the landing of the troops in Thessaloniki. In 1916 the pro-German King of Greece agreed with the Germans to allow military forces of the Central Powers to enter Greek Macedonia to attack Bulgarian forces in Thessaloniki. As a result, Bulgarian troops occupied the eastern part of Greek Macedonia, including the port of Kavala. The region was, however, restored to Greece following the victory of the Allies in 1918. After the destruction of the Greek Army in Asia Minor in 1922 Greece and Turkey exchanged most of Macedonia's Turkish minority and the Greek inhabitants of Thrace and Anatolia, as a result of which Aegean Macedonia experienced a large addition to its population and became overwhelmingly Greek in ethnic composition. Serbian-ruled Macedonia was incorporated into the Kingdom of Serbs, Croats and Slovenes (later the Kingdom of Yugoslavia) in 1918. Yugoslav Macedonia was subsequently subjected to an intense process of "Serbianization" during the 1920s and 1930s.

The first Balkan War managed to liberate Balkans from Turks and settled the major issues except Macedonia. In the spring 1913 the Serbs and Greeks begun the 'Serbianization' and the 'Hellenization' of the parts in Macedonia they already controlled, while Bulgarians faced some difficulties against the Jews and the Turkish populations. Moreover, the possession of Thessalonica was a living dream for the Bulgarians that were preparing for a new war. For this, the Bulgarian troops had a secret order in June 1913 to launch surprise attacks on the Serbs. Greece and Serbia signed a previous bilateral defensive agreement (May 1913). Consequently, Bulgaria decided to attack Greece and Serbia. After some initial gains the Bulgarians were forced to retreat back to Bulgaria proper and lose nearly all of the land they had conquered during the first war.

The Treaty of Bucharest (August 1913) took off most of the Bulgarian conquests of the previous years. A large part of Macedonia became southern Serbia, including the territory of what today is the Republic of North Macedonia, and southern Macedonia became northern Greece. Greece almost doubled its territory and population size and its northern frontiers remain today, more or less the same since the Balkan Wars. However, when Serbia acquired 'Vardarska Banovina' (the present-day Republic of North Macedonia), it launched having expansionist views aiming to descend to the Aegean, with Thessalonica as the highest ambition. However, Greece after the population exchange with Bulgaria, soon after its victory in the Balkan wars, managed to give national homogeneity in the Aegean and any remaining Slavic-speakers were absorbed.

Many volunteers from Macedonia joined Bulgarian army and participated in the battles against Bulgarian enemies in these wars—on the strength of the Macedonian-Adrianopolitan Volunteer Corps and other units.

==== World War I ====
After World War I, the status quo of Macedonia remained the same. The establishment of the 'Kingdom of Serbians, Croats and Slovenes' in 1918, which in 1929 was renamed 'Yugoslavia' (South Slavia), neither predicted no special regime for Skopje nor recognized any Macedonian national identity. In fact, the claims to Macedonian identity remained silent at a propaganda level because, eventually, North Macedonia had been a Serbian conquest.

The situation in Serbian Macedonia changed after the Communist Revolution in Russia (1918–1919). According to Sfetas, Comintern was handling Macedonia as a matter of tactics, depending on the political circumstances. In the early 1920s it supported the position for a single and independent Macedonia in a Balkan Soviet Democracy. Actually, the Soviets desired a common front of the Bulgarian communist agriculturists and the Bulgarian-Macedonian societies to destabilize the Balkan Peninsula. The Internal Macedonian Revolutionary Organization (IMRO), under the protection of Comintern, promoted the idea of an independent Macedonia in a Federation of Balkan states, unifying all Macedonians. However, the possible participation of Bulgaria in a new war, on the Axis side, ended the Soviet support some years later.

=== World War II ===
During World War II the boundaries of the region shifted yet again. When the Nazi German forces occupied the area, most of Yugoslav Macedonia and part of Greek Macedonia were transferred for administration to Bulgaria. During the Bulgarian administration of Eastern Greek Macedonia, some 100,000 Bulgarian refugees from the region were resettled there and perhaps as many Greeks were deported or fled to other parts of Greece. Western Aegean Macedonia was occupied by Italy, with the western parts of Yugoslav Macedonia being annexed to Italian-occupied Albania. The remainder of Greek Macedonia (including all of the coast) was occupied by Nazi Germany. One of the worst episodes of the Holocaust happened here when 60,000 Jews from Thessaloniki were deported to extermination camps in occupied Poland. Only a few thousand survived. Bulgaria joined the Axis powers in 1941, when German troops prepared to invade Greece from Romania reached the Bulgarian borders and demanded permission to pass through Bulgarian territory. Threatened by direct military confrontation, Tsar Boris III had no choice but to join the Tripartite Pact, which officially happened on 1 March 1941. There was little popular opposition, since the Soviet Union was in a non-aggression pact with Germany.

On 6 April 1941, despite having officially joined the Axis Powers, the Bulgarian government maintained a course of military passivity during the initial stages of the invasion of Yugoslavia and the Battle of Greece. As German, Italian, and Hungarian troops crushed Yugoslavia and Greece, the Bulgarians remained on the sidelines. The Yugoslav government surrendered on 17 April. The Greek government was to hold out until 30 April. On 20 April, the period of Bulgarian passivity ended. The Bulgarian Army entered the Aegean region. The goal was to gain an Aegean Sea outlet in Eastern Macedonia and Thrace and much of eastern Serbia. The so-called Vardar Banovina was divided between Bulgaria and Italians which occupied West Macedonia. The Bulgarian occupation of Macedonia was technically viewed as interim administration in anticipation of a conclusive internationally recognized settlement of the legal status of the so-called "New Lands" after the end of the Second World War. Bulgarian administration greatly contributed to economic rebirth of the region – the poorest one in the former Kingdom of Yugoslavia – through introducing measures such as allotment of arable lands to local landless peasantry and by establishing plenty of new elementary and secondary schools. Local population with Bulgarian ethnic origins was given full Bulgarian citizenship. In general, Bulgarians themselves regarded the incorporation of former Yugoslav Vardar Banovina as a way to achieve national unity. Two new oblasts (provinces) were formed and most public vacancies were filled up with representatives of the local population.

Yugoslav Macedonia was liberated in 1944 by the Macedonian Partisans, when the Red Army's advance in the Balkan Peninsula forced the German forces to retreat. The pre-war borders were restored under U.S. and British pressure because the Bulgarian government was insisting to keep its military units on Greek soil. The Bulgarian Macedonia returned fairly rapidly to normality, but the Bulgarians in Yugoslav Macedonia underwent a process of ethnic cleansing by the Belgrade authorities.

During the German occupation of Greece (1941–1944), the Greek Communist Party-KKE was the driving force of the main resistance movement EAM-ELAS (National Liberation Front). The Slavic-speaking members of EAM in Greek Macedonia had either Bulgarian, Greek or distinct Macedonian conscience. KKE established SNOF with the cooperation of the Yugoslav leader Tito, who was ambitious enough to make plans for Greek Macedonia. Later EAM and SNOF disagreed in issues of policy and they finally clashed and the latter was expelled from Greece in 1944. Greek Macedonia was ravaged by the Greek Civil War, which did not end until October 1949. The defeat of the Democratic Army of Greece forced its Slav-speaking members to leave Greece among others. Although there was some liberalization between 1959 and 1967, the Greek military dictatorship re-imposed harsh restrictions. The situation gradually eased after Greece's return to democracy.

=== Post–World War II ===
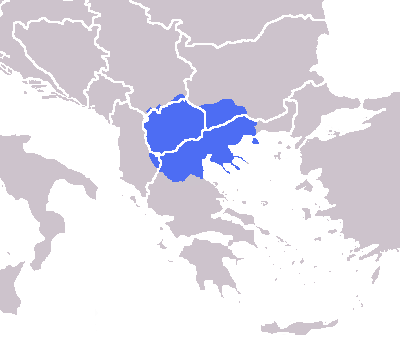
The maximum range of the modern geographical region of Macedonia (shown in blue), which includes Greek Macedonia (in Greece), the Republic of North Macedonia, Blagoevgrad Province (in Bulgaria), Mala Prespa and Golo Brdo (in Albania), Prohor Pčinjski (in Serbia), and Gora (in Kosovo).

==== Greece ====
Greek Macedonia encompasses entirely the southern part of the wider region of Macedonia. Greek Macedonia incorporates most of the territories of Argeads' Macedon, including its capitals Aigai and Pella. Before the expansion of Macedonia under Philip in the 4th century BC, the kingdom of the Macedonians covered an area corresponding roughly to the modern Greek regions of Western and Central Macedonia. Greek Macedonia is the largest by size and the second-largest by population traditional geographic region of Greece, with its largest city Thessaloniki, being Greece's second largest city. The coast was heavily developed for tourism, particularly on the Halkidiki peninsula. The Slavic speaking minority of Greek Macedonia is not recognised by the Greek state as an ethnic minority. Even as recently as the 1990s Greece has been criticised by international human rights activists for "harassing" ethnic Macedonian political activists, who, nonetheless, are free to maintain their own political party, Rainbow.

==== Bulgaria ====
Under Georgi Dimitrov, Soviet loyalist and head of the Comintern, Bulgaria initially accepted the existence of a distinct Macedonian national identity. It had been agreed that Pirin Macedonia would join Yugoslav Macedonia and for this reason the population was forced to declare itself "Macedonian" in the 1946 census. This caused resentment and many people were imprisoned or interned in rural areas outside Pirin Macedonia. After Tito's split from the Soviet bloc this position was abandoned and the existence of a Macedonian ethnicity or language was denied.

==== Yugoslavia and North Macedonia ====
Yugoslav Macedonia was the only region where Yugoslav communist leader Josip Broz Tito had not developed a Partisan movement because of the Bulgarian occupation of a large part of that area. To improve the situation, in 1943 the League of Communists of Macedonia was established in Tetovo with the prospect that it would support the resistance against the Axis. In the meantime, the Bulgarians' violent repression led to loss of moral support from the civilian population. By the end of the war "a Macedonian national consciousness hardly existed beyond a general conviction, gained from bitter experience, that rule from Sofia was as unpalatable as that from Belgrade. But if there were no Macedonian nation there was a Communist Party of Macedonia, around which the People's Republic of Macedonia was built". Tito thus separated Yugoslav Macedonia from Serbia after the war. It became a republic of the new federal Yugoslavia, as the Socialist Republic of Macedonia in 1946, with its capital at Skopje. Tito also promoted the concept of a separate Macedonian nation, as a means of severing the ties of the Slav population of Yugoslav Macedonia with Bulgaria. A separate Macedonian Orthodox Church was established, splitting off from the Serbian Orthodox Church. The Communist Party sought to deter pro-Bulgarian sentiment, which was punished severely.

The use of the country name "Macedonia" was disputed for over 25 years between the Hellenic Republic and North Macedonia (then-Republic of Macedonia) after its independence from Yugoslavia in 1991. It was resolved through negotiations between the two countries, mediated by the United Nations, resulting in the Prespa Agreement, signed on 17 June 2018.

== Demographics ==
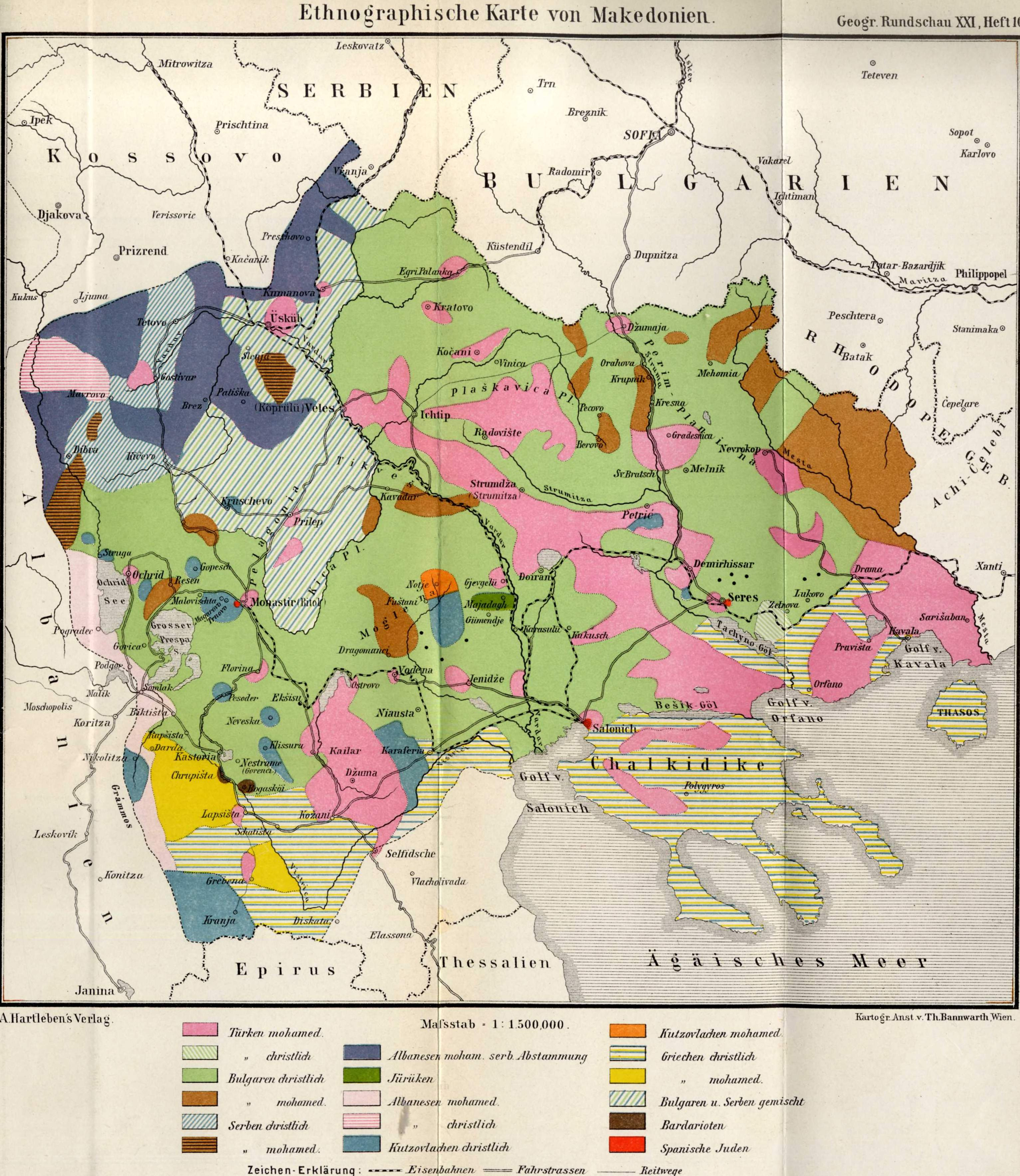
Distribution of ethnic groups in Macedonia in 1892 (Deutsche Rundschau für Geographie und Statistik – German Bevieiofor Geography and Statistics)

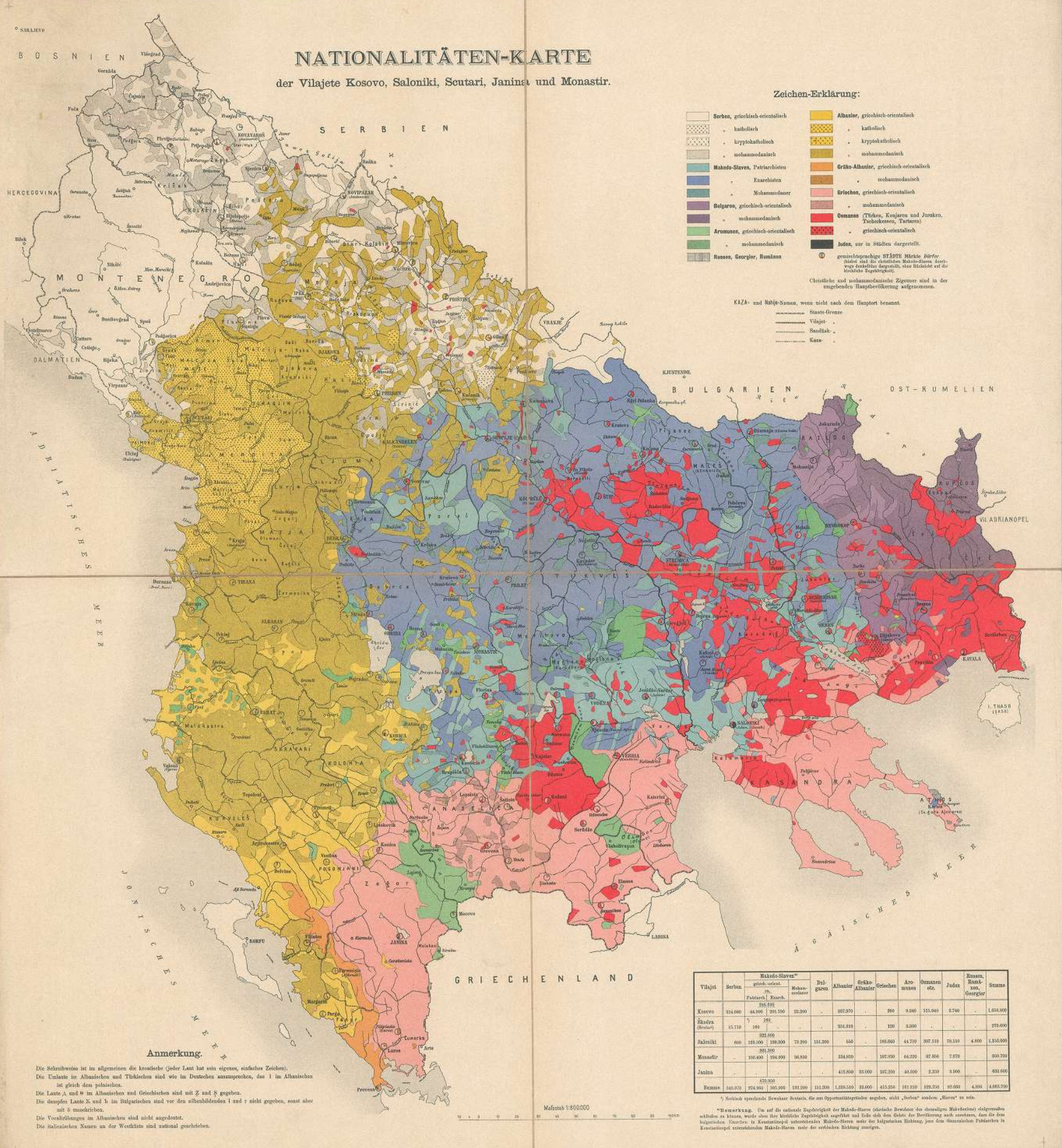
Ethnographic map of the vilayets of Kosovo, Saloniki, Scutari, Janina and Monastir, ca. 1900 (Institute and Museum of Military History)

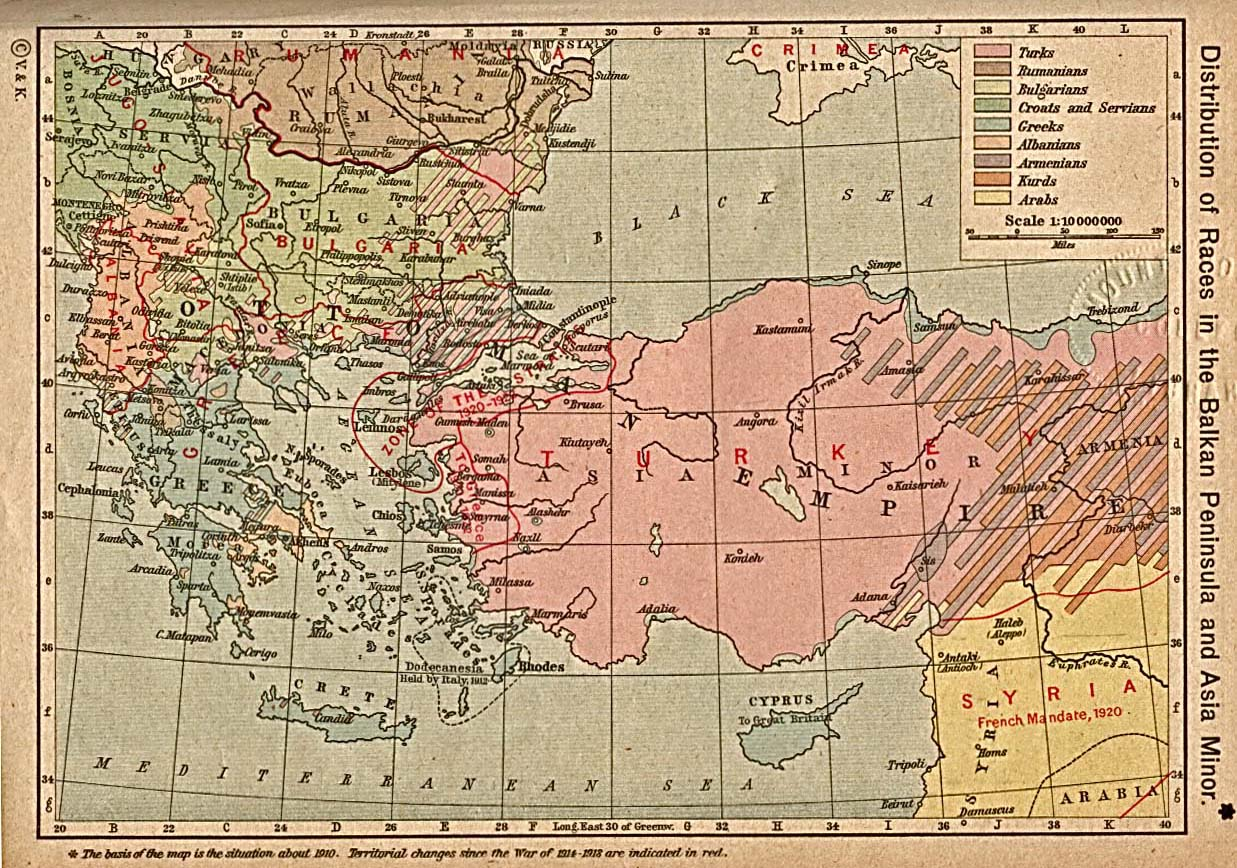
Distribution of ethnic groups in the Balkan Peninsula and Asia Minor in 1910 (Historical Atlas by William R. Shepherd, New York)

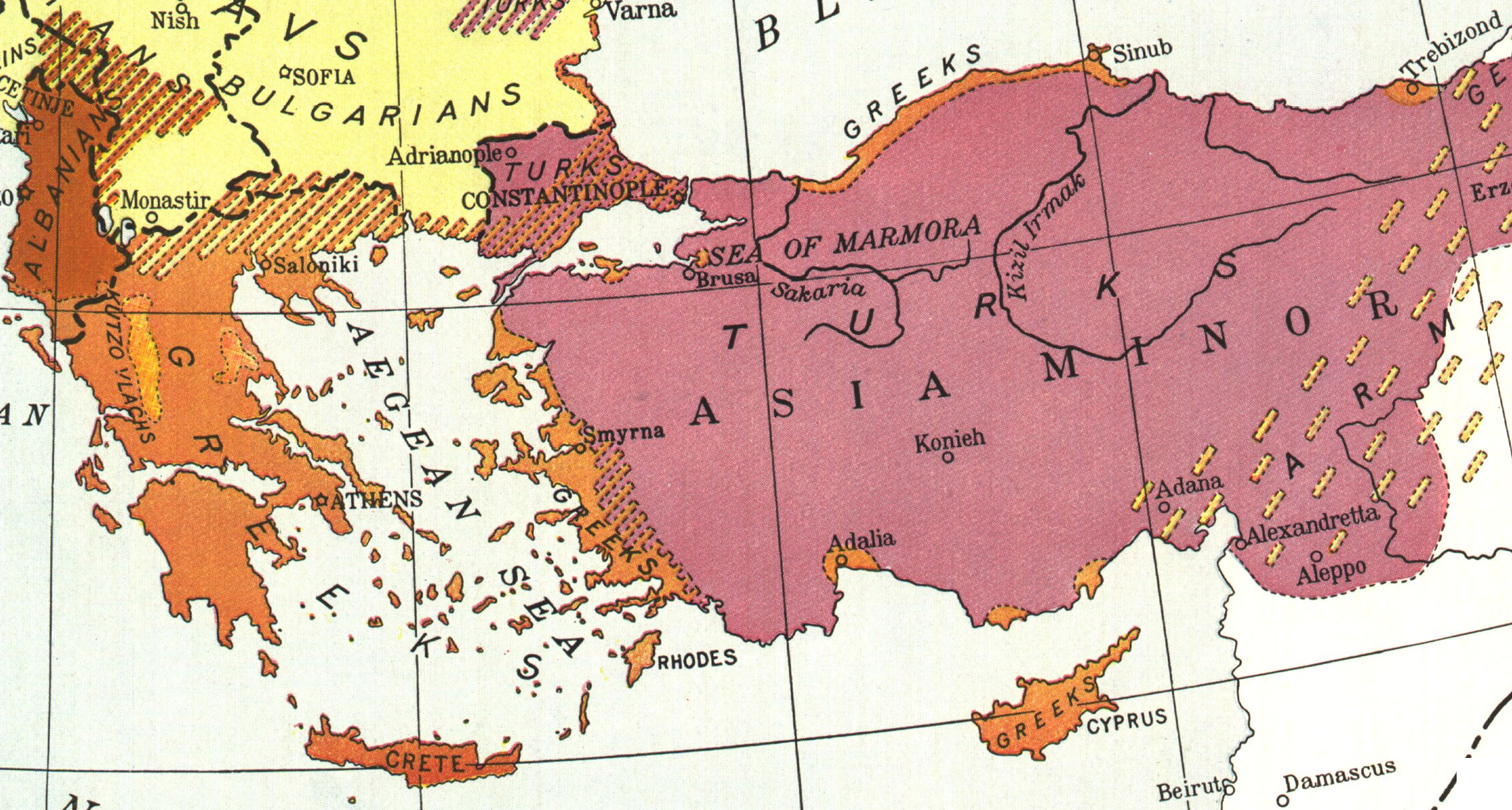
Distribution of ethnic groups in the Balkan Peninsula and Asia Minor in 1918 (National Geographic)

During medieval and modern times, Macedonia has been known as a Balkan region inhabited by many ethnic groups.

=== Current Demographics ===
The current demographics of the region include:

- Greek Macedonians self-identify culturally and regionally as "Macedonians" (Greek: Μακεδόνες, Makedónes). They form the majority of the region's population (~51%). They number approximately 2,500,000 and, today, they live almost entirely in Greek Macedonia. The Greek Macedonian population is mixed, with other indigenous groups and with a large influx of Greek refugees descending from Asia Minor, Pontic Greeks, and East Thracian Greeks in the early 20th century. This is due to the population exchange between Greece and Turkey, during which over 1.2 million Anatolian Greek refugees replaced departing Turks and settled in Greece, including 638,000 in the Greek province of Macedonia. Smaller Greek minorities exist in Bulgaria and the Republic of North Macedonia, although their numbers are difficult to ascertain. In official census results, only 86 persons declared themselves Greeks in Bulgarian Macedonia (Blagoevgrad Province) in 2011, out of a total of 1,379 in all of Bulgaria; while only 294 persons described themselves as Greeks in the 2021 census in the Republic of North Macedonia.
- Ethnic Macedonians self-identify as "Macedonians" (Macedonian: Македонци, Makedonci) in an ethnic sense as well as in the regional sense. They are the second largest ethnic group in the region. They form the majority of the population in the Republic of North Macedonia where according to the 2021 census, approximately 1,100,000 people declared themselves as Macedonians. Being a South Slavic ethnic group, they are also referred to as "Macedonian Slavs". In 1999, the Greek Helsinki Monitor estimated a significant minority of ethnic Macedonians ranging from 10,000 to 30,000 that exist among the Slavic-speakers of Greek Macedonia. There has not been a census in Greece on the question of mother tongue since 1951, when the census recorded 41,017 Slavic-speakers, mostly in the West Macedonia periphery of Greece. The linguistic classification of the Slavic dialects spoken by these people are nowadays typically classified as Macedonian, with the exception of some eastern dialects which can also be classified as Bulgarian, although the people themselves call their native language a variety of terms, including makedonski, makedoniski ("Macedonian"), slaviká (Greek: σλαβικά, "Slavic"), dópia or entópia (Greek: εντόπια, "local/indigenous [language]"), balgàrtzki, bògartski ("Bulgarian") along with naši ("our own") and stariski ("old"). The term "Slavomacedonian", though originally acceptable, can be viewed as derogatory by ethnic Macedonians in Greek Macedonia. Most Slavic-speakers declare themselves as ethnic Greeks (Slavophone Greeks), although there are small groups espousing ethnic Macedonian and Bulgarian national identities, however some groups reject all these ethnic designations and prefer terms such as "natives" instead. The Macedonian minority in Albania are an officially recognised minority in Albania and are primarily concentrated around the Prespa region and Golo Brdo and are primarily Eastern Orthodox Christian with the exception of the later region where Macedonians are predominantly Muslim. In the 2011 Albanian census, 5,870 Albanian citizens declared themselves Macedonians. According to the latest Bulgarian census held in 2011, there are 561 people declaring themselves ethnic Macedonians in the Blagoevgrad Province of Bulgaria (Pirin Macedonia). The official number of ethnic Macedonians in Bulgaria is 1,654.
- Macedonian Bulgarians are ethnic Bulgarians who self-identify regionally as "Macedonians" (Bulgarian: Mакедонци, Makedontsi). They represent the bulk of the population of Bulgarian Macedonia (also known as "Pirin Macedonia"). They number approximately 250,000 in the Blagoevgrad Province where they are mainly situated. There are small Bulgarian-identifying groups in Albania, Greece and the Republic of North Macedonia. In the Republic of North Macedonia, 3,504 people claimed a Bulgarian ethnic identity in the 2021 census.
- Albanians are another major ethnic group in the region. Ethnic Albanians make up the majority in certain northern and western parts of the Republic of North Macedonia, and account for 24.3% of the total population of the Republic of North Macedonia, according to the 2021 census.
- Smaller numbers of Turks, Bosniaks, Roma, Serbs, Aromanians, Megleno-Romanians, Egyptians, Armenians and Jews (Sephardim and Romaniotes) can also be found in Macedonia.

=== Religion ===
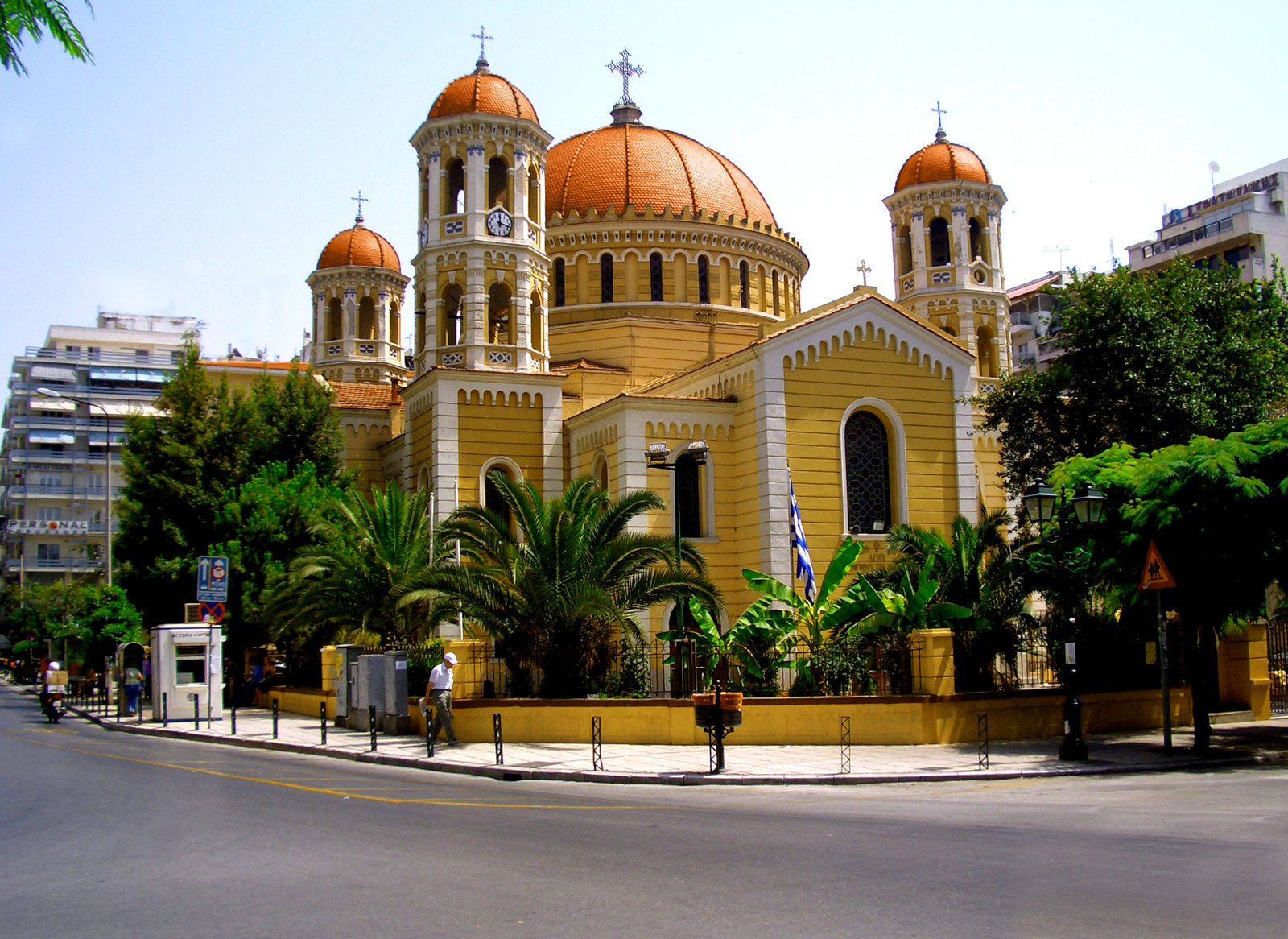
Saint Gregory Palamas Cathedral in Thessaloniki

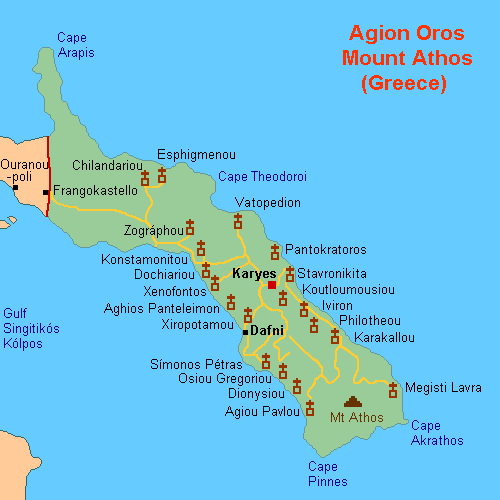
Monasteries of the Mount Athos in Macedonia (Greece)

Most present-day inhabitants of the region are Eastern Orthodox Christians, principally of the Bulgarian Orthodox, Greek Orthodox, Macedonian Orthodox and Serbian Orthodox Churches. Notable Muslim minorities are present among the Albanian, Bulgarian (Pomaks), Macedonian (Torbeš), Bosniak, and Turkish populations.

During the period of classical antiquity, main religion in the region of Macedonia was the Ancient Greek religion. After the Roman conquest of Macedonia, the Ancient Roman religion was also introduced. Many ancient religious monuments, dedicated to Greek and Roman deities are preserved in this region. During the period of Early Christianity, ecclesiastical structure was established in the region of Macedonia, and the see of Thessaloniki became the metropolitan diocese of the Roman province of Macedonia. The archbishop of Thessaloniki also became the senior ecclesiastical primate of the entire Eastern Illyricum, and in 535 his jurisdiction was reduced to the administrative territory of the Diocese of Macedonia. Later it came under the jurisdiction of the Ecumenical Patriarch of Constantinople.

During the Middle Ages and up to 1767, western and northern regions of Macedonia were under the jurisdiction of the Archbishopric of Ohrid. Northern fringes of the region (areas surrounding Skopje and Tetovo) had temporary jurisdiction under the Serbian Patriarchate of Peć. Both the Archbishopric of Ohrid and the Patriarchate of Peć became abolished and absorbed into the Ecumenical Patriarch of Constantinople in the middle of the 18th century. During the period of Ottoman rule, a partial islamization was also recorded. In spite of that, the Eastern Orthodox Christianity remained the dominant religion of local population.

During the 19th century, religious life in the region was strongly influenced by rising national movements. Several major ethnoreligious disputes arose in the region of Macedonia, main of them being schisms between the Ecumenical Patriarch of Constantinople and the newly created Bulgarian Exarchate (1872), and later between the Serbian Orthodox Church and the newly created Macedonian Orthodox Church (1967).

== See also ==
- Blagoevgrad Province
- History of Albania
- History of the Balkans
- History of Bulgaria
- History of Greece
- History of North Macedonia
- History of Serbia
- Irredentism
- List of homonymous states and regions

== Sources ==
- Curta, Florin (2006). Southeastern Europe in the Middle Ages, 500–1250. Cambridge: Cambridge University Press. ISBN 978-0-521-81539-0.
- Fine, John V. A. Jr. (1991) [1983]. The Early Medieval Balkans: A Critical Survey from the Sixth to the Late Twelfth Century. Ann Arbor: University of Michigan Press. ISBN 0-472-08149-7.
- Fine, John V. A. (1994) [1987]. The Late Medieval Balkans: A Critical Survey from the Late Twelfth Century to the Ottoman Conquest. Ann Arbor, Michigan: University of Michigan Press. ISBN 978-0-472-10079-8.
- Meyendorff, John (1989). Imperial unity and Christian divisions: The Church 450–680 A.D. Crestwood, NY: St. Vladimir's Seminary Press. ISBN 9780881410563.
- Nesbitt, John; Oikonomides, Nicolas, eds. (1991). Catalogue of Byzantine Seals at Dumbarton Oaks and in the Fogg Museum of Art, Volume 1: Italy, North of the Balkans, North of the Black Sea. Vol. 1. Washington, DC: Dumbarton Oaks Research Library and Collection. ISBN 0-88402-194-7.
- Nicol, Donald M. (1993) [1972]. The Last Centuries of Byzantium, 1261–1453 (Second ed.). Cambridge: Cambridge University Press. ISBN 978-0-521-43991-6.
- Obolensky, Dimitri (1974) [1971]. The Byzantine Commonwealth: Eastern Europe, 500–1453. London: Cardinal. ISBN 9780351176449.
- Ostrogorsky, George (1956). History of the Byzantine State. Oxford: Basil Blackwell.
- Popović, Radomir V. (1996). Le Christianisme sur le sol de l'Illyricum oriental jusqu'à l'arrivée des Slaves. Thessaloniki: Institute for Balkan Studies. ISBN 9789607387103.
- Roisman, Joseph; Worthington, Ian (2010). A Companion to Ancient Macedonia. Malden, MA: Wiley-Blackwell. ISBN 9781444351637.
- Runciman, Steven (1968). The Great Church in Captivity: A Study of the Patriarchate of Constantinople from the Eve of the Turkish Conquest to the Greek War of Independence (1. ed.). Cambridge: Cambridge University Press. ISBN 9780521071888.
- Slijepčević, Đoko M. (1958). The Macedonian Question: The Struggle for Southern Serbia. Chicago: The American Institute for Balkan Affairs.
- Soulis, George Christos (1984). The Serbs and Byzantium during the reign of Tsar Stephen Dušan (1331–1355) and his successors. Washington: Dumbarton Oaks Library and Collection. ISBN 9780884021377.
- Stanković, Vlada, ed. (2016). The Balkans and the Byzantine World before and after the Captures of Constantinople, 1204 and 1453. Lanham, Maryland: Lexington Books. ISBN 9781498513265.
