= Zagoria (theme) =

The Theme of Zagoria (Greek: Θέμα Ζαγορίων) or the Theme of Melenikon was a administrative division (Theme) of the Byzantine Empire, created during the 11th century.

The Theme was mentioned in a chrysobull of Alexios II Komnenos in 1198. The capital of the Theme was the fortified city of Melenikon (Melnik), in modern-day Bulgaria, and it was created during the rule of Basil II from territories detached from the Theme of Strymon. The Theme was situated between the Themes of Triaditsa and Velevousdou, Ohrid, Serres and it contained the territory of the historical region of Zagoria, in southwestern Bulgaria.

Known commanders:

- Theodoros Nestongos, Ioannis Angelos and Dragotas - 1255
- Michael Laskaris Metochites - 1321
- Nikephoros Basilikos - 1328
- Ioannis Asan - 1342
