= Strumica (theme) =

The Theme of Strumica or Stromnitsa or Strategis of Stromnitsa (Greek: Θέμα Στρώμνιτσας) was an administrative division (Theme) of the Byzantine Empire created during the 11th century. It was one the smaller frontier Themes, which were also called Strategis.

The subdvision was located in the territory of modern-day North Macedonia, with its capital in the city of Stromnitsa (Strumica). The Theme was created in 1018 and included the newly conquered territories from the Bulgarian Empire by Emperor Basil II.

Known commanders:

- Pharesmanes Apokapes
- David Arianites - 1015 - 1017 (before formal creation of the Theme)
- Dimitrios Angelos Metochites - 1321
- Michael Asanis - 1328
