= Servia (theme) =

The Theme of Servia or the Strategis of Servia (Greek: Στρατηγίς Σερβίων) was an administrative division of the Byzantine Empire (Theme) during the 11th and 13th centuries. The Theme was created by the Emperor Basil II in 1020 after his victory against the Bulgarians, when he separated the region of Servia alongside the region of Stagoi (Kalambaka) and Trikala in Thessaly, from the Theme of Thessalonica and ecclesiastically incorporated the new subdvision into the Archbishopric of Ohrid. The region of Stagoi returned to the ecclesiastical jurisdiction of Larissa during the rule of Manuel Komnenos (1143–1180), but administratively remained in the Theme of Servia. It was one of the smaller frontier Themes, which were called Strategis during the 12th century.

Its seat was the Castle of Servia, in modern-day Servia, Kozani regional unit, Greece. The Theme ceased to exist during the Fourth Crusade and it was not re-established when Servia was reconquered by Theodore Doukas, the ruler of Epirus.
