= Theme of Ohrid =

The Theme of Ohrid or Achrida (Greek: Θέμα Οχρίδας) was a administrative division of the Byzantine Empire (Theme), one of the smaller and frontier Themes, which were also called Strategides.

The Theme included the region of Ohrid, in modern day North Macedonia, and its general was subordinated to the Dux of the Bulgarian Theme.

Known commandants or strategos:

- Gonitziatis, 1015 - 1018
- Eustathios Daphnomeles, 1018 - ?
- Marianos, 1071 - 1078

== Sources ==
- Tzanis, Ioannis, (1994, Aristotle University of Thessaloniki (AUTH)), Το Πρόβλημα της ύπαρξης Βυζαντινού θέματος Σερβίας κατά τον 11ο μ.χ. αιώνα, Συμβολή στη μελέτη της διοικητικής οργάνωσης της βόρειας Βαλκανικής
- Zakythinos, Dion A. (1941) Επετηρίς Εταιρείας Βυζαντινών Σπουδών (Society for Byzantine studies), Μελέται περί της διοικητικής διαιρέσεως και της επαρχιακής διοικήσεως εν τω Βυζαντινώ κράτει (Studies on administrative division and provincial administration in the Byzantine state)
