= Early thermal weapons =

Weapons during the classical and medieval periods that used heat or burning for damage

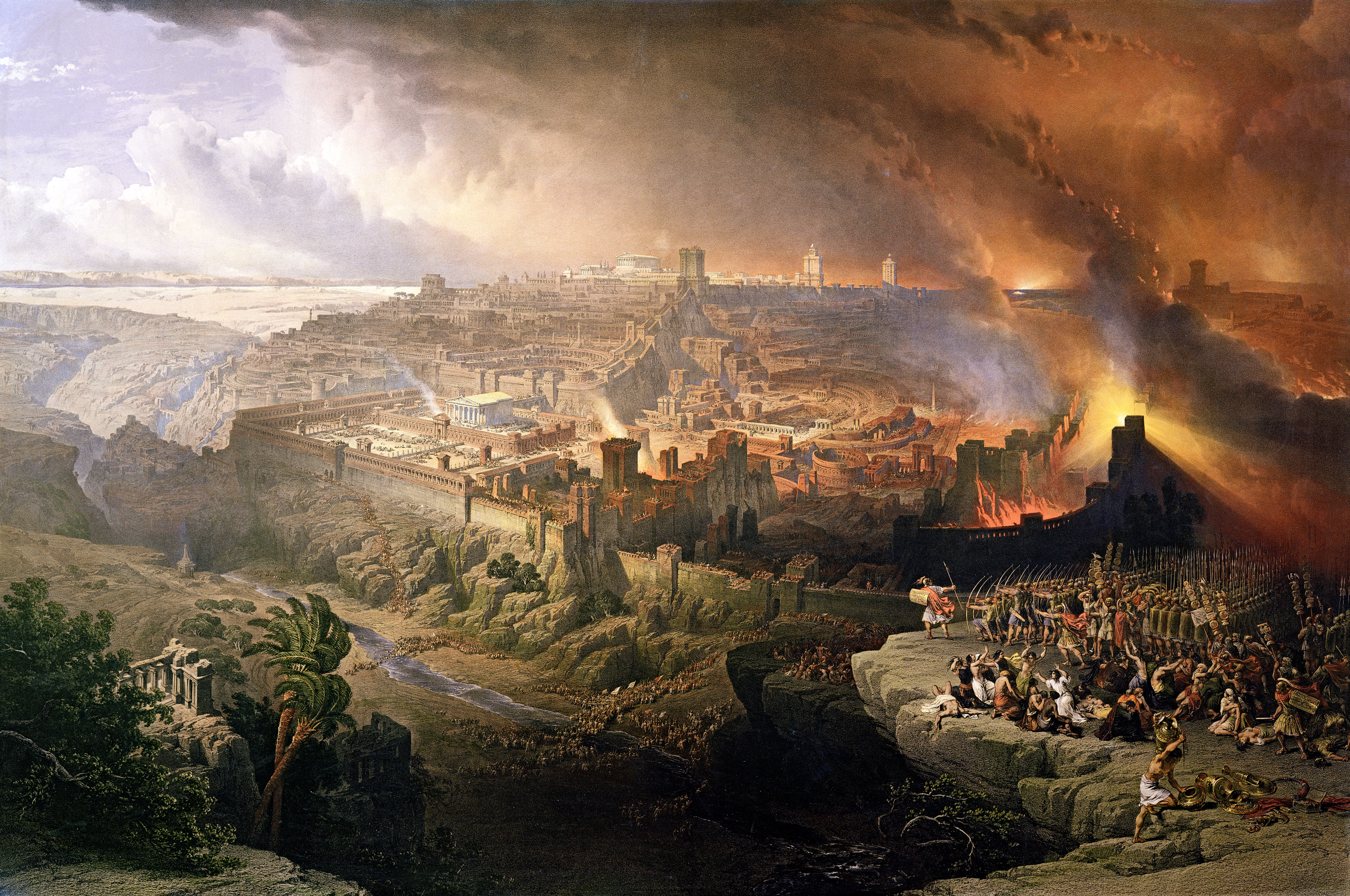
The Siege and Destruction of Jerusalem by the Romans Under the Command of Titus, A.D. 70, by David Roberts (1850), shows the city burning

Early thermal weapons, which used heat or burning action to destroy or damage enemy personnel, fortifications or territories, were employed in warfare during the ancient and post-classical periods (approximately the 8th century BC until the mid-16th century AD).

Incendiary devices were frequently used as projectiles during warfare, particularly during sieges and naval battles: some substances were boiled or heated to inflict damage by scalding or burning; other substances relied on their chemical properties to inflict burns or damage. These weapons or devices could be used by individuals, thrown by siege engines, or utilised as army strategy. Incendiary mixtures, such as the petroleum-based Greek fire, could be launched by throwing machines or administered through a siphon. Sulfur- and oil-soaked materials were sometimes ignited and thrown at the enemy, or attached to spears, arrows and bolts and fired by hand or machine.

The simplest and most common thermal projectiles were boiling water and hot sand, which could be poured over attacking personnel. Other anti-personnel weapons included the use of hot pitch, oil, resin, animal fat and other similar compounds. Smoke was used to confuse or drive off attackers. Substances such as quicklime and sulfur could be toxic and blinding.

Fire and incendiary weapons were also used against enemy structures and territory, sometimes on a massive scale. Large tracts of land, towns and villages were frequently ignited as part of a scorched earth strategy. Some siege techniques—such as mining and boring—relied on combustibles and fire to complete the collapse of walls and structures.

Towards the latter part of the period, gunpowder was invented, which increased the sophistication of the weapons, starting with fire lances, which led to the eventual development of the cannon and other firearms. Development of the early weapons has continued ever since, with modern war weapons such as napalm, flame throwers, and other explosives having direct roots in the original early thermal weapons. Fire-raising and other destructive strategies can still be seen in modern strategic bombing.

== "Fire and sword" ==
Behold from your walls the lands laid waste with fire and sword, booty driven off, the houses set on fire in every direction and smoking.

— Livy, The History of Rome

The destruction of enemy possessions and territory was a fundamental strategy of war, serving the dual purpose of punishment and deprivation of resources. Until the 5th century BC, the Greeks had little expertise in siege warfare and relied on a strategy of devastation to draw the enemy out; they destroyed crops, trees and houses. Centuries later, the Byzantines recommended this strategy, even though they had developed siege technology.

Fire was the easiest way of harrying and destroying territories, and could be done easily and quickly by small forces. It was a strategy put to good use by the Scots during the Wars of Independence; they repeatedly launched raids into northern England, burning much of the countryside until the whole region was transformed. King Edward III of England pursued one raiding party in 1327 by following the lights of burning villages.

War without fire is like sausages without mustard

— Jean Juvénal des Ursins on Henry V's bombardment of Meaux in 1421

The tactics were replicated by England during the Hundred Years' War; fire became their chief weapon as they laid waste to the French countryside during lightning raids called chevauchées, in a form of economic warfare. One estimate records the destruction of over 2000 villages and castles during one raid in 1339.

As well as causing the destruction of lands, food and belongings, fire could also be used to divert manpower. 13th century Mongol armies regularly sent out small detachments from their main forces to start grass fires and fire settlements as diversions.

Devastation by fire was not only used as an offensive tactic; some countries and armies employed "scorched earth" policies on their own land to deprive invading armies of all food and forage. King Robert the Bruce of Scotland reacted to the English invasion of 1322 by launching punitive and diversionary chevauchées into north-west England, then retreating to Culross, burning as he went the Scottish lands which lay in the path of the English army. The English ran out of food and had to abandon the campaign.

Such acts of aggression were not limited to wars against territorial enemies, but could form part of the strategies of conquest, subjugation and punishment of rebellion. Alexander the Great suppressed a revolt in Thebes, Greece in 335 BC, after which he ordered the city to be torched and laid waste. Alexander ordered (or allowed) a similar arson at Persepolis in 330 BC. It was a policy which was repeated throughout the period. William the Conqueror, following his conquest of England in the 11th century, asserted his control of Northumbria by destructive campaigns throughout the region: "He ordered that crops and herds, tools and food should be burned to ashes. More than 100,000 people perished of hunger", reported Orderic Vitalis, a contemporary chronicler. It was a scene repeated the following century, during The Anarchy of Stephen of England's reign. Civil war erupted between Stephen's supporters and those of the Empress Matilda, a rival claimant for the throne. The Gesta Stephani tells of the deeds of one of Stephen's supporters, Philip of Gloucester, by describing how he "raged in all directions with fire and sword, violence and plunder", reducing territory to "bare fields and dreadful desert".

== Techniques of use ==
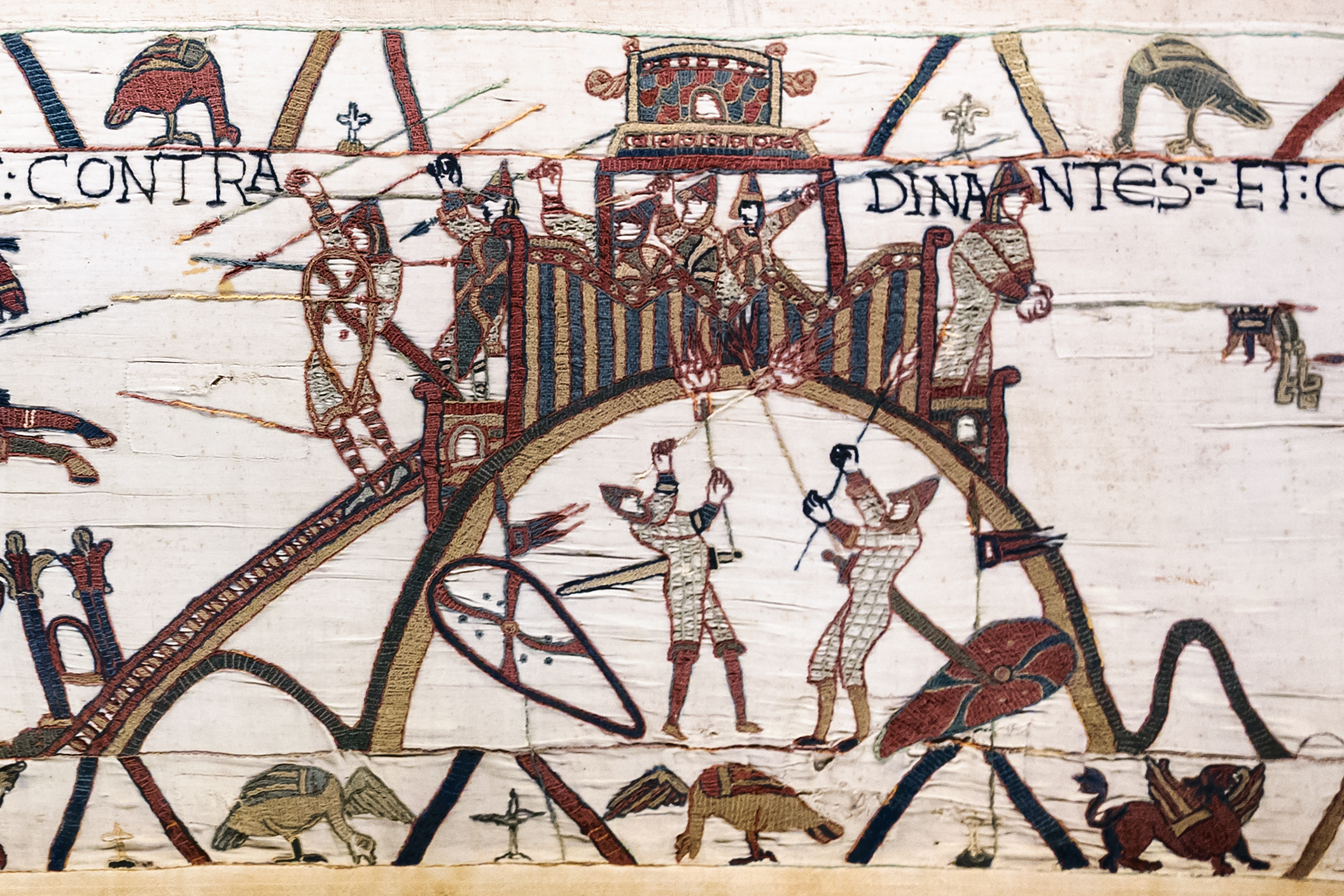
Normans use torches to fire the wooden keep on a motte at Dinan, 1064, Bayeux Tapestry

At the simplest level, fire itself was used as a weapon to cause large-scale destruction, or to target specific enemy positions or machinery. It was frequently used against siege engines and wooden structures. Incendiary weapons could be used to set fire to towns and fortifications, and a wide range of thermal weapons were used against enemy personnel. Some armies developed specialised "fire-troops". By 837, many Muslim armies had groups of "naffatin" (fire archers), and when the Mamluk Sultanate raised a fleet for an attack on Cyprus (1425) they had "nafata", or fire-troops.

=== Simple fire-raising ===
The burning of enemy positions and equipment was not necessarily a complicated procedure, and many fires were set by individuals using common materials. When William of Normandy's army besieged Mayenne in 1063, they shot fire into the castle to panic the garrison, while two boys stole into the castle in order to start a fire within. The garrison surrendered.

Besieged forces would sometimes launch sorties in an attempt to fire the attackers' camps or equipment. When Hugh Capet besieged Laon in 986–987, his troops became drunk one night, and Duke Charles's men sallied forth and torched the camp, forcing Hugh to abandon the siege.

The besieged were not the only ones who might fire siege equipment; when Frederick Barbarossa abandoned his siege of Alessandria in 1175, he burned his own camp and equipment.

However, like all weapons, fire-raising had its own dangers. In 651 Penda of Mercia attempted to win Bamburgh Castle by building a pyre at its base from planks, beams, wattle and thatch. The wind changed direction and the fire blew back on Penda's men, who had to abandon the attack. This fortuitous wind-change was credited to Saint Aidan, who saw the smoke from the Farne Islands and prayed for the defenders.

=== Throwing machines ===
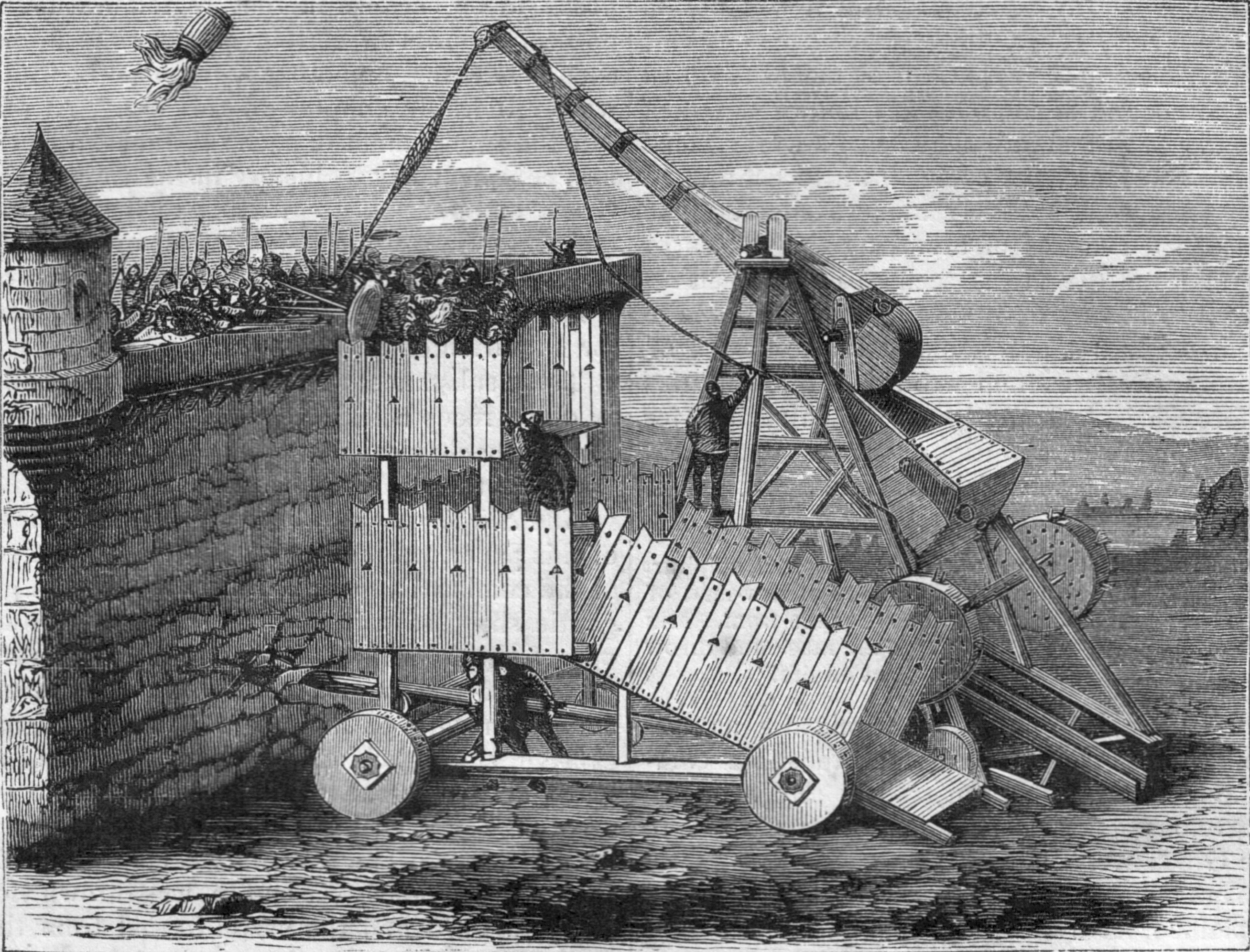
1869 engraving showing a 13th-century trebuchet launching an incendiary missile

Various throwing machines were in use throughout the classical and medieval periods. Generally referred to as "artillery", these engines could hurl, fire or shoot missiles and most could be used or adapted for throwing thermal weapons, by attacking and defending forces. Barrels, fire pots and other breakable containers of pitch, Greek fire, and other incendiary mixtures could be thrown; other machines fired arrows and bolts, which could be ignited, or adapted to carry flammable mixtures. From the 12th century, Muslims in Syria were using clay and glass grenades for fire weapons, thrown by machines.

Most of the terms used for throwing machines were vague, and could refer to different engines, all of which went through changes and developments over time. Among the most common were the ballista, mangonel and trebuchet. The ballista was similar in form to a crossbow, though much larger, and used a string-winding mechanism to fire a missile or bolt placed in a groove. Other giant crossbows were used throughout the period, and an "espringal", based on the ballista, which threw large bolts, was developed in the 13th century. Torsion-powered arrow firers had been used from 400 BC, and were adapted for stones. A mangonel had a wooden spoon-shaped arm, to hold a stone or other projectile, which was manipulated under tension from a twisted rope. The trebuchet was an advanced development of the 12th or 13th century, which used a counter-weight to power the throwing arm, and was the major siege engine until the cannon became widespread.

=== In mining ===
Forces attacking a castle or other strong fortification sometimes sought to undermine the foundations by digging "mines" or tunnels underneath them. Usually, such mining or digging machinery was protected by a tortoise (also called a cat, sow, or owl): a covered shed on wheels, which shielded the miners from missile attack.

As the tunnels were constructed, they were generally supported by wooden beams and posts. Once the mine had been finished, the internal space was filled with combustibles, such as brushwood, firewood, resin, and other incendiary substances; once ignited, these would burn the supporting props, causing the mine to collapse, bringing down with it the structures lying above. From the 15th century, gunpowder was also used, although the aim remained to burn the props.

Defenders might sometimes dig counter-tunnels in order to reach the enemy's mines and launch an attack; frequently thermal weapons were used to drive the besiegers from the tunnels.

Rather than undermining a structure, some besiegers used borers to drill holes in the outer walls in an effort to destroy them; such methods were more effective than rams on brick walls (which tended to absorb the shocks from the ram). Borers differed in size and mechanism, but a typical machine was made from a log of wood, tipped with iron and supported and driven by windlasses or ropes. Once a series of holes had been bored along the length of a wall, the holes were typically filled with rods of dry wood, saturated with sulfur or pitch and then ignited. Bellows could be used to encourage a blaze.

=== Fire ships ===
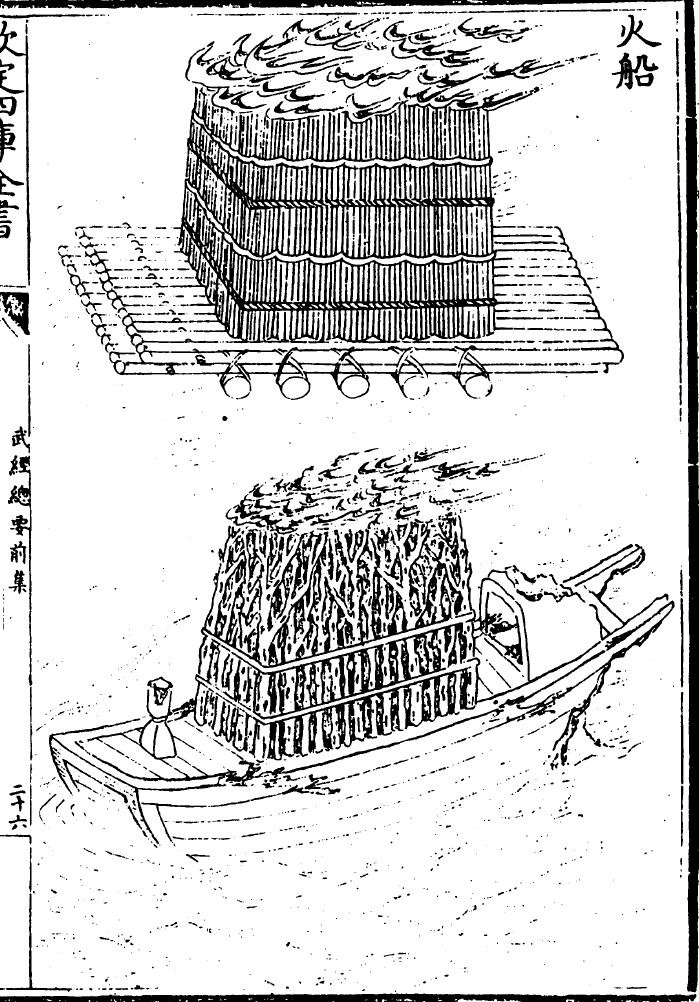
Chinese fire ships from the Wujing Zongyao military manuscript, 1044, Song dynasty

Fire ships were used on several occasions throughout the period. In 332 BC Alexander the Great laid siege to Tyre, a coastal base of the Phoenicians. In order to bring his siege engines within range, Alexander ordered the construction of moles. The Tyrians responded by attacking the first mole with a large fireship, which destroyed it. A large horse transport ship was packed with cedar torches, pitch, dried brush and other combustibles; above this were suspended cauldrons of sulfur, bitumen and "every sort of material apt to kindle and nourish flame". This was towed to the mole, and lit by the Phoenicians before they jumped overboard and swam away.

Another example occurred during the 886 Siege of Paris, when the Vikings filled three warships with combustible material and pulled them upriver in a failed attempt to destroy the Franks' fortified bridges. Fire ships containing straw and powder were also used during the Chinese Battle of Lake Poyang in 1363.

=== Other methods ===
Often ingenious methods were developed for administering the weapons. The 10th-century Olga of Kiev is reported to have tied burning tinder to birds which, when released, flew back to their nests in the hostile town and set them alight. Siege towers and ladders could be fitted with a long, narrow tilting beam at the top, gouged with a groove, so that hot oil and water could be poured down on the enemy defenders during an escalade.

During an attack, castle or fortification defenders could launch or pour the substances on the heads of attackers below. This could be done over the battlements, but also through purpose-built holes such as machicolations and murder-holes. Indian records suggest smoke and fire was used defensively within a fortress to confuse and disorient attackers; iron grills could also be heated and used to block passageways. During night attacks, defenders could drop lighted bundles over the walls so the enemy could be seen; Chinese and Muslim sources also describe the light gained by torches hung on the walls.

=== Use against stone castles ===
Stone castles were susceptible to fire, since they contained many combustible materials. In 1139, Henry de Tracy forced the surrender of Torrington Castle by the simple expedient of tossing lighted torches through the keep's loopholes.

Stone was also susceptible to intense heat, which would cause it to crack and collapse. Byzantine sources recorded the demolition of stone structures caused by placing clay pots of burning charcoal at the base of walls moistened with vinegar or urine, and the 6th century treatise by an engineer in Justinian's army includes the lighting of fires beneath the walls amongst its instructions for sieges.

Stone castles sometimes offered other inflammatory targets. During the Crusades, Muslim defenders frequently hung bundles of straw against their walls as buffers against stones and rams; in turn, the Crusader archers would set these alight with flaming arrows.

=== Defense against thermal attack ===
Defense from thermal weapons and fire attacks was usually water or other liquids such as urine; hides were soaked and draped over vulnerable wooden hoardings and siege engines, vats and barrels of liquid were collected and stored by defenders and attackers. Hides were hung in an overlapping manner so that any water would run down the whole structure to extinguish flames. Some thermal weapons (such as quicklime or oil) could not be extinguished or eased by water, in which case sand or earth could be used. Wooden structures were frequently soaked in alum to increase their fire resistance. The Romans covered their tortoises (mobile siege sheds) with raw hides packed with vinegar-soaked seaweed or chaff, to serve as protection against regular and incendiary missiles. Throughout the period, sacks or nets might be filled with vinegar-moistened chaff, seaweed or wet moss and hung on the exterior. The wooden siege engines of the Crusaders were vulnerable to attack from the Byzantine and Muslim fire-weapons, so the troops inside siege towers kept stores of water and vinegar.

During the High Middle Ages, the majority of Poland's castles were still made of wood, so uncut stone was frequently added to the front to improve their fire defences.

Both attackers and defenders needed to be prepared for incendiary and thermal attack. When the Athenians besieged Syracuse in 416 BC they lost many siege engines to fire. The Syracusan ruler Dionysius I must have taken note of this success, for when he laid siege to Motya in 398 BC he organised special fire "brigades", who successfully doused the fires when his siege engines were bombarded.

During the First English Civil War, incendiary devices were used to raze city centers. Defenders in London were advised to combat the flames using milk, sand, earth, and urine. In Colchester, fires caused by hand grenades (the weapon was called "wildfire" by the combatants) were extinguished using wet clothes saturated in milk and vinegar.

== Types of weapons ==
=== Flaming arrows, bolts, spears, and rockets ===
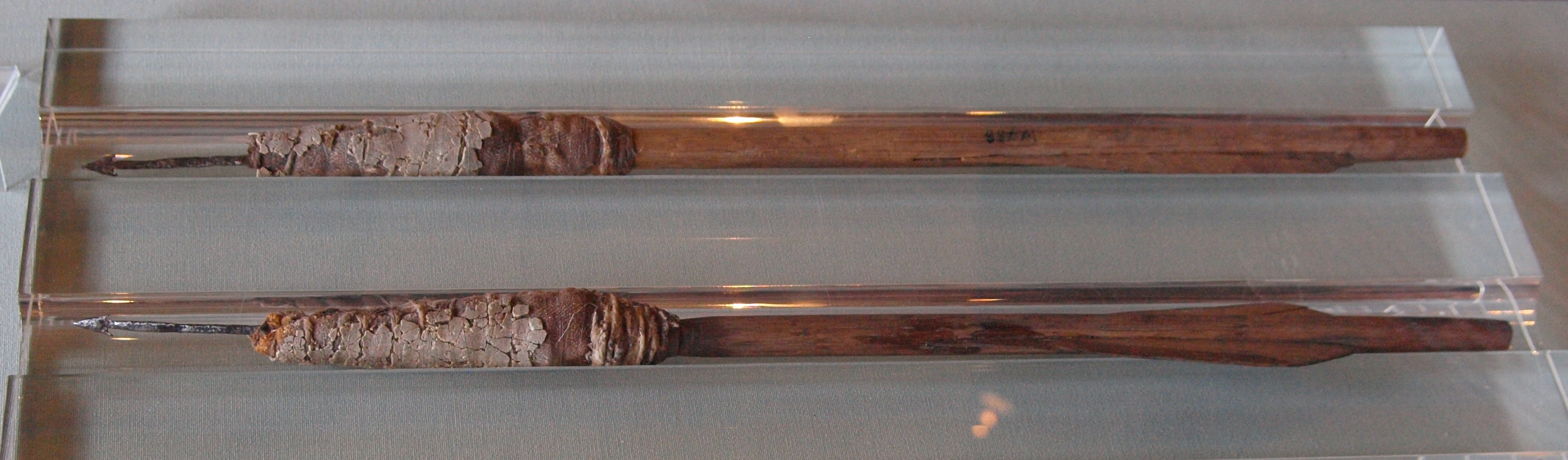
Two fire arrows (crossbow bolts). Southern Germany, ca. 15th century, with preserved incendiary mixture of saltpeter, charcoal, sulphur and textile on the shaft.

Lit torches (burning sticks) were likely the earliest form of incendiary device. They were followed by incendiary arrows, which were used throughout the ancient and medieval periods. The simplest flaming arrows had oil- or resin-soaked tows tied just below the arrowhead and were effective against wooden structures. Both the Assyrians and the Judeans used flaming arrows at the Siege of Lachish in 701 BC. More sophisticated devices were developed by the Romans which had iron boxes and tubes which were filled with incendiary substances and attached to arrows or spears. These arrows needed to be shot from loose bows, since swift flight extinguished the flame; spears could be launched by hand or throwing machine.

Flaming arrows required the shooter to get quite close to their desired target and most will have extinguished themselves before reaching the target. In response, another form of fire arrow was developed which consisted of curved metal bars connecting a tip and hollow end for the shaft. The resulting cage was filled with hot coals or other solid object which could be fired from a much stronger bow or ballista without fear of extinguishing and would be used to ignite straw or thatch roofs from a safer distance.

Flaming arrows and crossbow bolts were used throughout the period. Anna Komnene records that at the Battle of Levounion in 1091, lighted torches were fixed to spears. Fifteenth-century writer Gutierre Diaz de Gamez witnessed a Spanish attack on the Moorish town of Oran in 1404 and later described how "During the most part of the night, the galleys did not cease from firing bolts and quarrells dipped in tar into the town, which is near the sea. The noise and the cries which came from the town were very great by reason of the havoc that was wrought."

The Chinese Song dynasty created fire arrows – arrows with pouches of gunpowder, which were launched en masse through platforms, and later created rockets such as the huo long chu shui, a multistage rocket used in naval combat. Primitive rockets made from bamboo and leather were used by the Mongols, under Genghis Khan, but were inaccurate. However, the Fatimids used "Chinese arrows" from the 11th century, which probably included saltpetre. The Mamluks experimented with a rocket-powered weapon described as "an egg which moves itself and burns".

A 2 m (6 ft 7 in) long iron crossbow-bolt probably designed to carry a fire cartridge was found in a 13th–14th-century castle in Vladimir, Russia. Such large machine-thrown bolts were ideal for incendiary weapons. The Mongols used an "ox-bow" machine to throw bolts which had been dipped in burning pitch, with a range of 2500 paces.

During the British Civil Wars (mid-17th century in Great Britain), both the Parliamentarian and Royalist armies used various incendiary devices to attack enemies and destroy property that might be used for military purposes, according to historian Stephen Porter in Destruction in the English Civil Wars. The flaming arrow attack was used to set fire to buildings at a distance. An arrow with a flammable substance attached to the shaft, close to the tip, was shot from a bow or short-muzzled musket. Such arrows shot from a musket had their feathers removed, to fit inside the muzzle, and were called fire-darts. These devices were cheap to make and easy to prepare. Although used infrequently during the wars, the flaming arrows and darts proved to be destructive. The Royalists shot flaming arrows into the thatched homes in the suburbs of Chester causing extensive damage. Lyme Regis was partly razed using flaming arrows.

=== Pyrphoros/Pyrphorus ===
According to Polybius, the ancient Rhodian admiral Pausistratus used a device called πυρφόρος (pyrphoros/pyrphorus) designed to project fire onto enemy ships while it was safely distant from the user's own vessel. The apparatus consisted of a funnel-shaped container (scoop or basket) filled with combustible material, suspended from the end of a pole by an iron chain that projected from the prow. These poles were supported by ropes running along the inner sides of the hull, allowing the funnel to extend outward on either side of the bow. Because the funnel was angled away from the ship, fire could be discharged into an enemy vessel during a charge or while passing alongside, without risking accidental ignition of the user’s own ship.

=== Greek fire ===
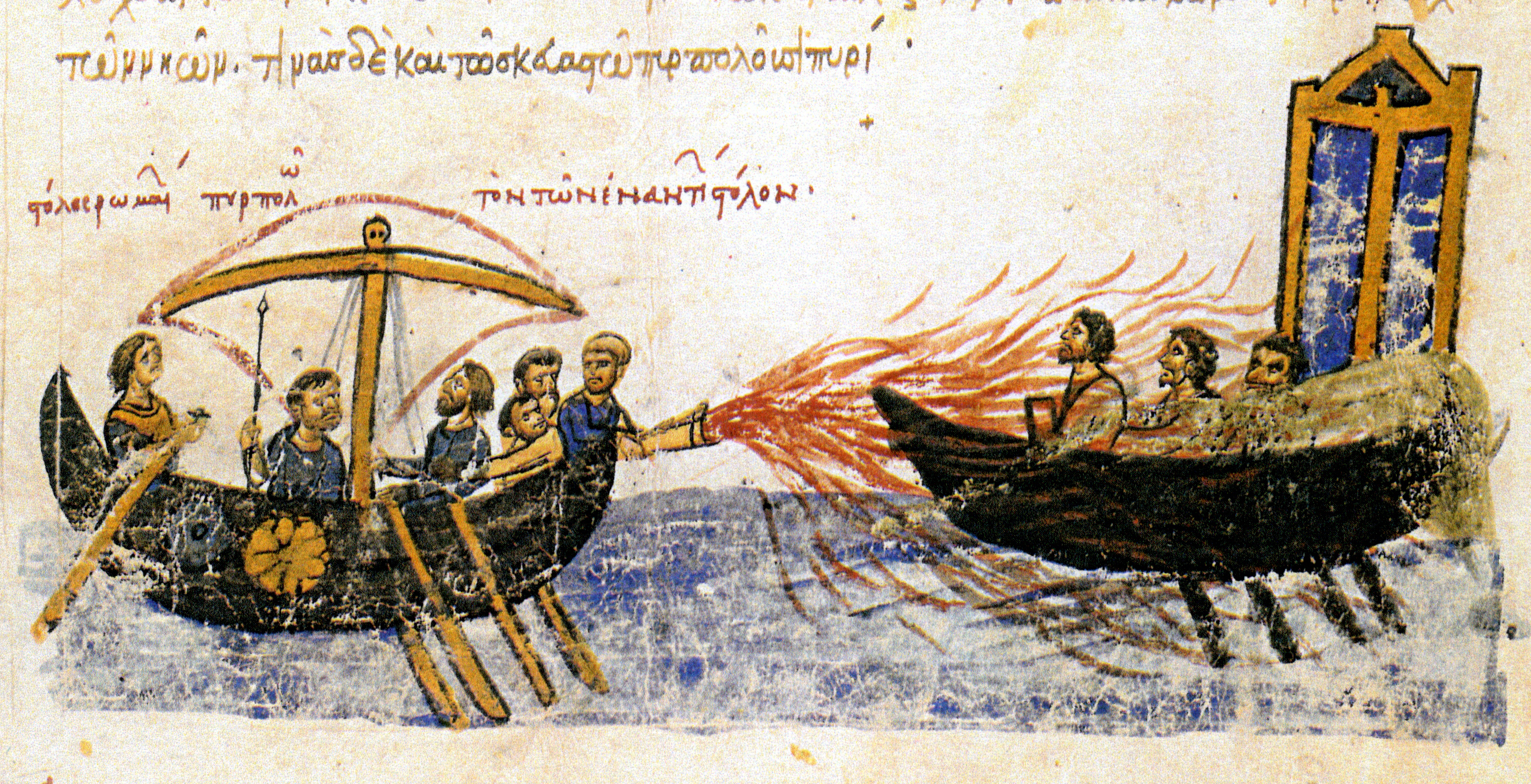
Depiction of Greek fire in the 12th century Madrid Skylitzes

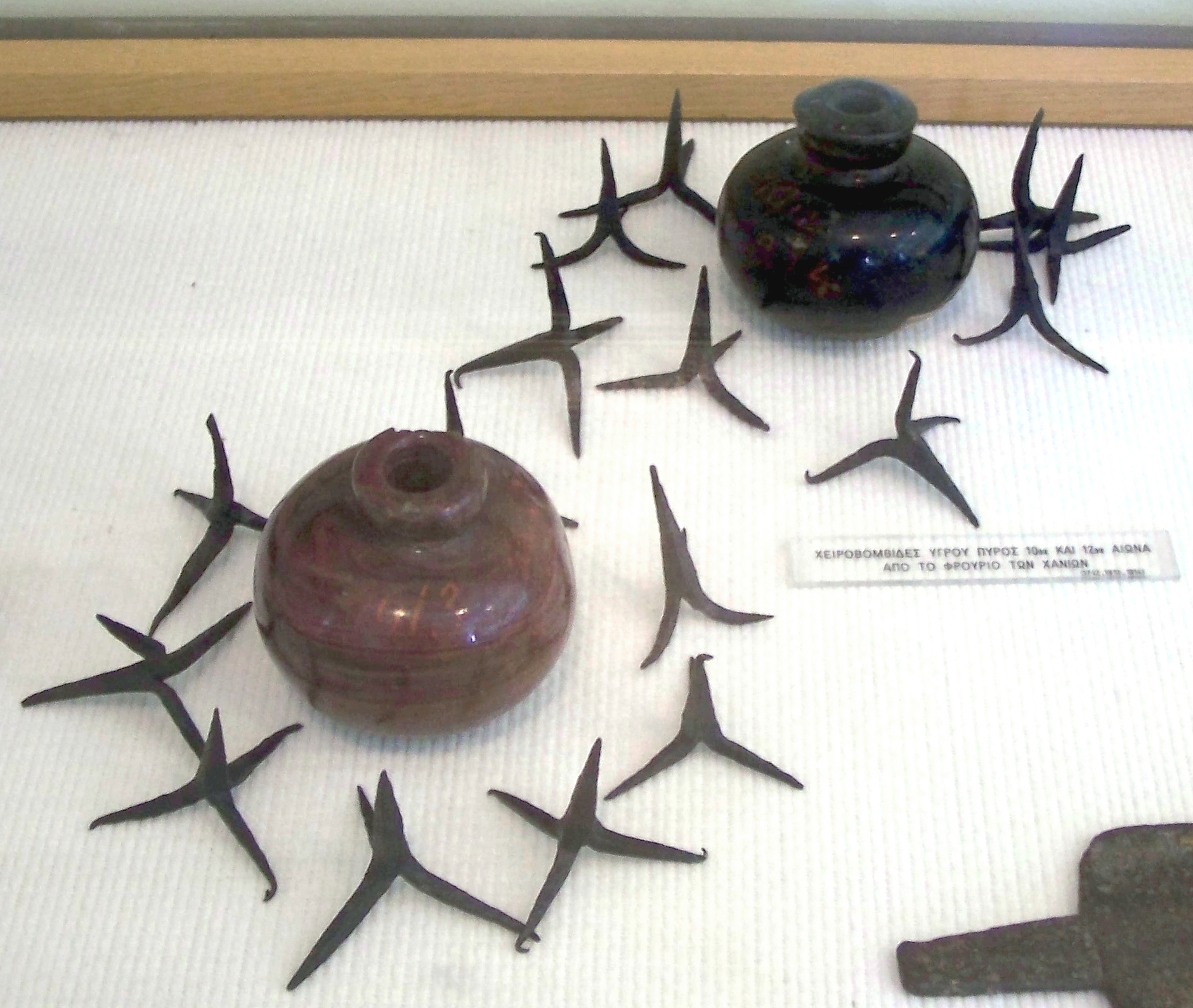
Hand grenades filled with Greek fire; surrounded by caltrops (10th–12th centuries National Historical Museum, Athens, Greece)

Greek fire was one of the most effective thermal devices, although it was extremely dangerous for the users. A combustible liquid, it could be shot from siphons or catapults, and it burst into flames on impact. First developed by the Byzantines in the 7th century, it was later used by the Turks during the Crusades, and was probably first used in Western Europe in the 12th century. Early experiments by the Byzantines in the 6th century used a mixture of sulfur and oil, which would have been terrifying if not destructive. Various versions seem to have existed, and the recipes were frequently kept secret; experts today still debate the exact composition, although some recipes are known. It probably had regional variations; the Islamic derivative was known as "naft" and had a petroleum base, with sulfur; the Persian word for "petroleum" is نفت (naft).

The combustible liquid could be shot from catapults, and would burst into flames on impact. Siphons, frequently of copper, were also developed, first appearing in the 10th and 11th centuries. The siphons could shoot a blazing stream, which a 10th-century Mesopotamian source claimed could engulf twelve men. Mardi bin Ali al-Tarsusi, who wrote a military manual for Saladin in the 12th century, suggested that "naft" could be placed inside blown eggshells, which could be thrown from horseback. From the 12th century, mouth-blown tubes were developed for use in mines.

Similar petroleum and bitumen-based incendiary mixtures had been known for centuries before the invention of Greek fire, but this new recipe created a blaze which was extremely difficult to extinguish. It burned on water, and was used effectively in naval warfare, although it was primarily an anti-personnel weapon rather than a ship-burner. It remained effective at sea even after its use had declined on land after the 13th century.

The Greek fire recipes continued to be developed over the centuries, and by the High Middle Ages was much more sophisticated than the early versions. Saltpetre (also called "Chinese salt") was added to the mixture in the Islamic world, and China developed a dry saltpetre mixture in the 12th century, which eventually became gunpowder. Both the Parliamentarian and Royalist armies used Greek-fire-like petroleum-based incendiary devices known as "wildfire" during the British Civil Wars.

Duarte Barbosa ca. 1514 listed weapons made by Javanese people, including Greek fire. Zhang Xie in Dong Xi Yang Kao (1618) mentioned that city of Palembang, which has been conquered by Javanese, produces the furious fiery oil (ming huo yu), which according to the Hua I Kao is a kind of tree secretion (shu chin), and is also called mud oil (ni yu). Zhang Xie wrote:

It much resemble camphor, and can corrode human flesh. When ignited and thrown on water, its light and flame become all the more intense. The barbarians use it as a fire-weapon and produce great conflagrations in which sails, bulwarks, upperworks and oars all catch fire and cannot withstand it. Fishes and tortoises coming in contact with it cannot escape from being scorched.

Because there was no mention of projector pump, the weapon is probably breakable bottles with fuses.

=== Hot oil ===
Oil of various kinds could be heated to high temperatures and poured over an enemy, although, since it was extremely expensive, its use was limited, both in frequency and quantity. Moreover, it could be dangerous and volatile. Since the smoke point of oil is lower than its boiling point, the oil was only heated and not boiled.

Pouring-oil was used in historic battles, and Josephus described its use at Jotapata in AD 67, saying "the oil did easily run down the whole body from head to foot, under their entire armour, and fed upon their flesh like flame itself."

Oil was usually used to create incendiary devices. The Roman-Byzantine armies of the 6th century created "fire-pots", oil-based incendiary weapons which could be launched by hand or with ballistae. During the siege at Montreuil-en-Bellay in 1147, a mixture of oils from nuts, cannabis and flax, was heated in iron containers, launched by mangonel, and burst into flames on impact. The Chinese made early grenades out of oil-soaked hemp and cotton, which were ignited and thrown by mangonels.

Another use of oil can be seen in the naval battle of La Rochelle during the Hundred Years' War; the Castilians sprayed oil on the decks of English ships then ignited it by shooting flaming arrows down.

=== Water, sand and other heated missiles ===
Hot oil was considerably less common than boiling water or heated sand, which were cheap and extremely effective; even "dust from the street" could be used. These would penetrate armour and cause terrible burns. Sand, especially, could work its way through very small gaps in armour. The Phoenicians at the Siege of Tyre (332 BC) dropped burning sand down on the attacking Greeks, which got in behind the armour and burned the flesh.

They built copper and iron shields, put sand into them, and heated them over hot fire so the sand became red-hot. By means of some mechanism they threw this sand at those who had fought bravest and subjected their victims to most severe suffering. The sand penetrated through the armour into the shirts, burned the body, and it could not be helped [...] they died, going mad with horrible pain, in sufferings piteous and unquenchable.

— Diodorus Siculus, on the 4th century BC Siege of Tyre

Such heated missiles have also been used in mining situations; the 1st century Roman writer Vitruvius describes a counter-mine dug above the attackers' gallery by defenders at the siege of Apollonia. Piercing the floor between the mines, the Apollonian defenders poured down boiling water, hot sand and hot pitch onto the heads of their enemy. Other mixtures were more innovative; the defenders at Chester in 918 boiled a mixture of water and ale in copper tubs and poured it over the Viking besiegers, causing their skin to peel off.

When Holy Roman Emperor Frederick Barbarossa besieged Crema, Italy in the 12th century, the defenders threw red-hot iron objects down on their attackers.

=== Pitch, tar and resin ===
Burning pitch was used on occasion. The Sasanians threw fire pots containing sulfur, pitch, and naptha ("oil of Medea") against Byzantine siege engines during the Siege of Petra (550–551). The Mongols were known to fire containers of burning tar during sieges using catapults and trebuchets. Wheels could be covered in pitch, set alight, and rolled along; this technique was commonly used during the Crusades. The besieged Carthaginians in Motya, 398 BC, set alight the siege engines of the attacking Syracusan forces under Dionysius I by dropping burning charred logs and resin-soaked oakum; however, the Syracusans were able to put out the fires.

Pitch was a base ingredient in many incendiary devices throughout the period. The Boeotians developed a fire machine, which they used against the Athenian wooden fortifications during the Battle of Delium in 424 BC. A cauldron of burning coals, pitch and sulfur was suspended at one end of a hollowed-out log and bellows were fixed to the other end. A similar mixture was used 1700 years later by the Scots, when they dropped bales of wood, tar and sulfur by crane onto the English "sow" (a large protective shield covering the battering ram) at the 1319 siege of Berwick-upon-Tweed.

=== Animal renderings and parts ===
At the 1215 siege of Rochester Castle, King John ordered that fat from 40 pigs be used to set fire to the mines beneath the keep, which caused it to collapse; a cheap and effective technique in place of the more complicated mixture of sulfur, tallow, gum, pitch and quicksilver he had used in France the previous year. Animal fat was not uncommon as an accelerant; in the 13th century French sortie-parties would often be equipped with animal fat, straw and flax to use as fuel when setting fires amongst enemy siege engines.

There were some other intriguing uses of animal parts; during the Siege of Paris in 886 AD, the Franks dropped bucket-loads of a hot mixture of pitch (or oil), wax and fish on the attacking Vikings; the mixture got under the armour and stuck to the skin. Konrad Kyeser's Bellifortis of 1405 describes a poisonous mixture of sulfur, tar and horses' hooves. Other incendiary ingredients included egg yolks, and pigeon and sheep droppings.

Some documented uses of animals were not thermal or incendiary. Live insects were also used, to sting the enemy. 4th century BC writer Aeneas Tacticus suggested defenders should let wasps and bees into enemy mines, and jars of scorpions were sometimes fired during early bombardment in naval battles. In 189 BC Ambracia was besieged by the Romans, who dug mines under the walls. The defenders filled a clay jar with chicken feathers, which they then lit, using bellows to blow the acrid smoke down the tunnel; unable to approach the pot due to defensive spears, the Romans were forced to abandon their works.

=== Quicklime, sulfur and smoke ===
The 15th-century engineer Taccola recommended quicklime, although its use went back to ancient times, and might well have been a component of Greek fire. Quicklime reacts violently with water, and can cause blindness and burns. While quicklime was used in some naval battles, it does not appear to have been standard issue on board ships, due to the danger of the quicklime blowing back and burning the user.

Other substances smoked rather than flamed. Sacks of burning sulfur were effective at clearing enemy mines due to the toxic smoke produced. Any smoke could be used in small confines; the Greek military writer Aeneas Tacticus recommended burning wood and straw to drive out enemy sappers by the smoke.

== Gunpowder and cannons ==
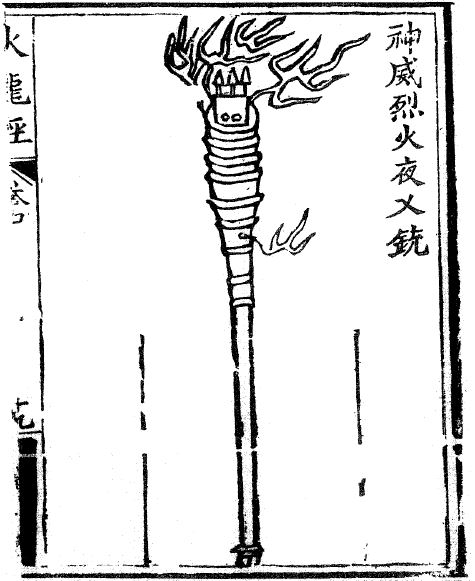
A fire lance called 'awe-inspiring fierce-fire yaksha gun' as depicted in the Huolongjing, c. 1300

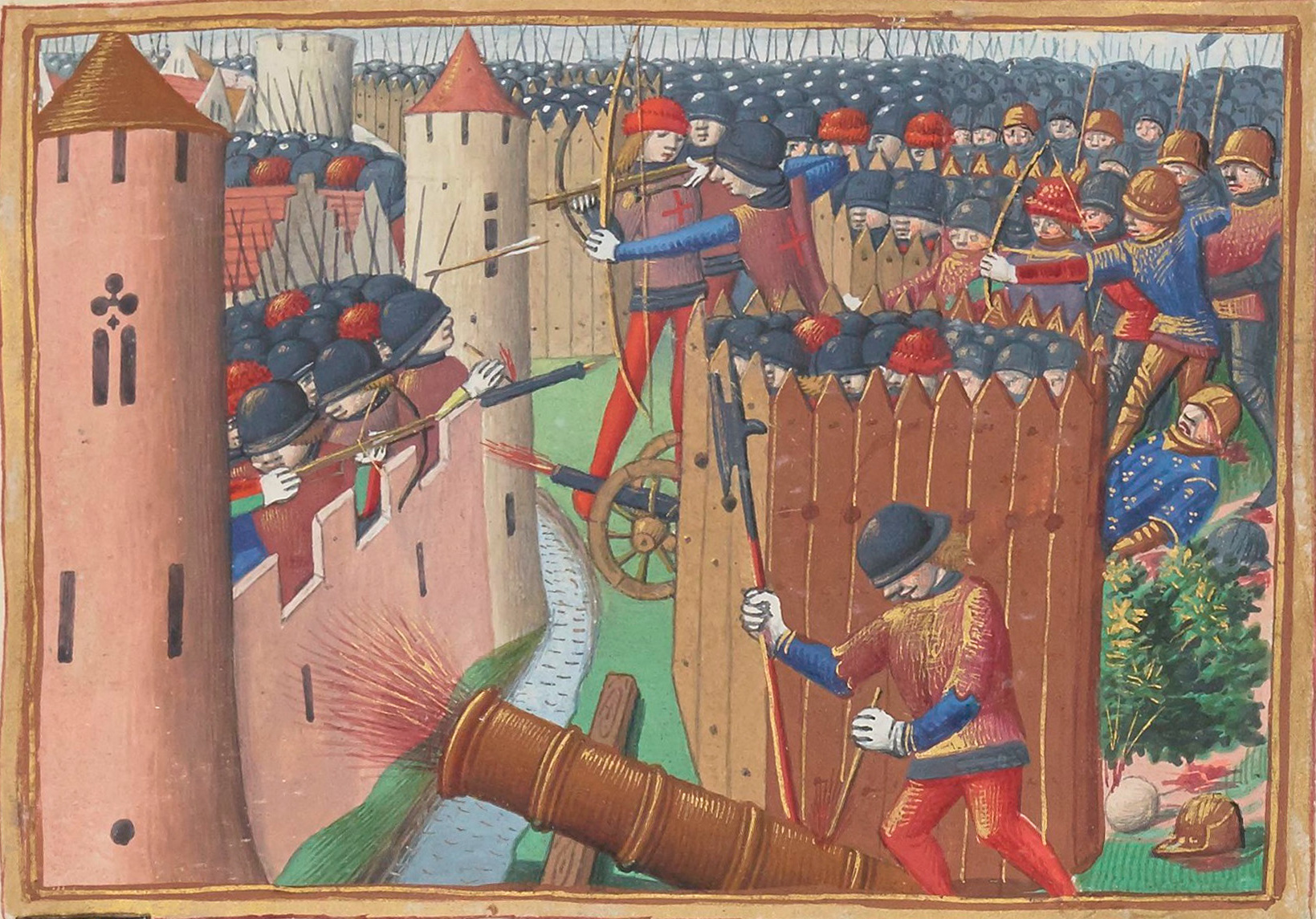
Siege of Orléans in 1428 (Vigiles de Charles VII, 15th century)

The discovery of gunpowder was probably the product of centuries of alchemical experimentation. Saltpetre was known to the Chinese by the mid-1st century AD and there is strong evidence of the use of saltpetre and sulfur in various largely medicinal combinations. The impetus for the development of gunpowder weapons in China was increasing encroachment by tribes on its borders. The earliest known formula for gunpowder can be found in a Chinese work dating probably from the 9th century. The Chinese wasted little time in applying it to warfare, and they produced a variety of gunpowder weapons, including flamethrowers, rockets, bombs, and mines, before inventing firearms. European descriptions of gunpowder first appear in Opus Maius and Opus Tertium, written by the English philosopher Roger Bacon in the mid-13th century, although the mixture was not very effective. The composition of gunpowder varied throughout the period, and did not settle into the current ratios of saltpetre, sulfur and charcoal until the 17th century.

The years 904–906 saw the use of incendiary projectiles called 'flying fires' (fei-huo). Needham (1986) argues that gunpowder was first used in warfare in China in 919 as a fuse for the ignition of another incendiary, Greek fire. Initially, gunpowder mixtures were utilised through traditional engines and throwing mechanisms; containers and grenades were thrown by mangonels and trebuchets, and explosive rockets and arrows were developed, along with gunpowder flamethrowers.

Like firearms, cannons are a descendant of the fire-lance, a gunpowder-filled tube used as a flamethrower; shrapnel-like material was sometimes placed in the barrel so that it would fly out together with the flames. In due course, the proportion of saltpeter in the propellant was increased to increase its explosive power. To better withstand that explosive power, the paper and bamboo of which fire-lance barrels were originally made came to be replaced by metal. And to take full advantage of that power, the shrapnel came to be replaced by projectiles whose size and shape filled the barrel more closely. With this, we have the three basic features of the gun: a barrel made of metal, high-nitrate gunpowder, and a projectile which totally occludes the muzzle so that the powder charge exerts its full potential in propellant effect.

Firearms remained in use in China throughout the following centuries. Meanwhile, gunpowder and firearms spread elsewhere very quickly. Gunpowder seems to have been widely known by the 13th century. The Europeans, Arabs, and Koreans all obtained firearms in the 14th century. The Turks, Iranians, and Indians all got firearms no later than the 15th century, in each case directly or indirectly from the Europeans. The Japanese did not acquire firearms until the 16th century, and then from the Portuguese rather than the Chinese.

In 1326, the earliest known European picture of a gun appeared in a treatise entitled "Of the Majesty, Wisdom and Prudence of Kings". On February 11 of that same year, the Signoria of Florence appointed two officers to obtain canones de mettallo and ammunition for the town's defense. A reference from 1331 describes an attack mounted by two Germanic knights on Cividale del Friuli, using gunpowder weapons of some sort. Cannons were first used by the Muslims at Alicante in 1331, or Algeciras in 1343. The French raiding party that sacked and burned Southampton in 1338 brought with them a ribaudequin and 48 bolts (but only 3 pounds of gunpowder). The Battle of Crécy in 1346 was one of the first in Europe where cannons were used.

However, early cannons were not very effective, the main benefits being psychological, frightening men and horses. Short barrelled, large-calibre "bombards" were used up until the late 15th century in Europe, during which period they grew increasingly larger. In the mid-15th century, mortars also appeared. Various smaller weapons also existed, including the serpentine, ribaudequin and cropaudin. The powder was of poor quality and was used in small quantities – to prevent explosion of the barrel – so the effective range of these cannons was rarely more than 200–250m.

The barrels of the cannons were forged or cast, and each gun generally differed in calibre and length. Early powder resembled a paste, and tended to burn slowly. Its composition varied in different geographical areas, the powder of Europe being quite different to that used in the Islamic world. The projectiles used were generally stone balls for bombards and mortars. Forged iron balls were used in smaller-calibre cannons, and coated with lead to make them smooth. From the 15th century, cast iron balls were used, which caused great destruction. As they were denser than stone, even small balls could be destructive. Thus, cannons became smaller in calibre, and longer barrels increased the range.

== Later development ==
The use of incendiary devices had decreased by the 14th century, perhaps due to the economic realities of war where it became increasingly important that captured castles and towns were undamaged. Moreover, fewer wooden engines and structures were employed in the battlefield after the late 13th century, perhaps because of the prior success of the incendiary weapons at destroying them.

While the incidence of use dropped, towards the latter end of the Middle Ages the incendiary devices became more sophisticated, and the principle of wielding fire with sword remained present throughout the Early Modern and Modern periods; improving technology merely allowed the process to become more efficient.

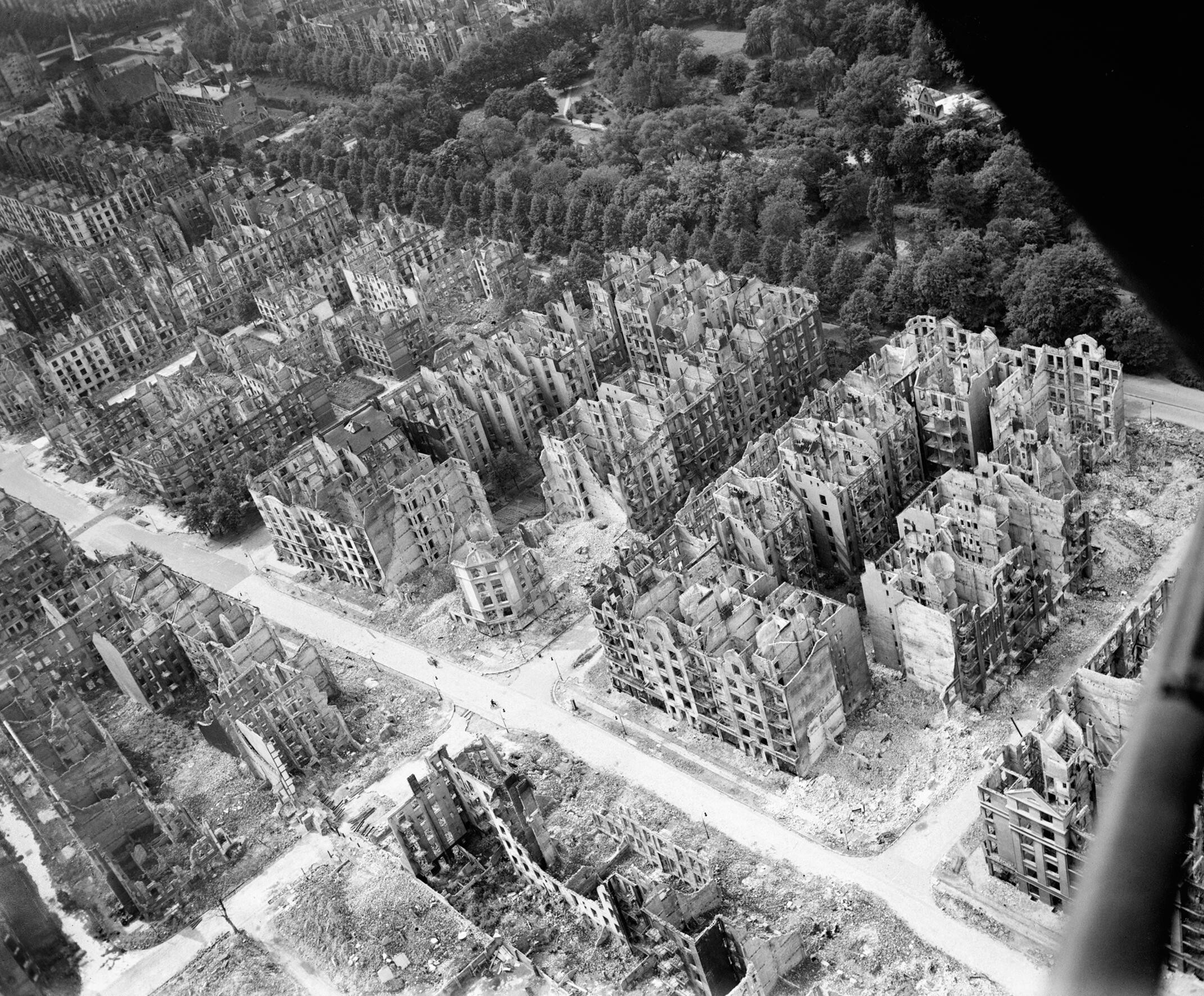
Burned-out buildings in Hamburg after the 1943 Allied incendiary attacks

=== The principle of fire and sword ===
Fire itself remained a part of warfare. In his reminisces of the Peninsular War (1807–1814), a British soldier recorded that the French soldiers would "regularly burn to the ground every place they pass through. In following them we find each town and village a heap of smoking ruins." During World War I, Leuven, in Belgium was "looted and burned in medieval fashion", when German soldiers set fire to much of the town, destroying the library and other cultural buildings, and causing outrage around the world. Yet the tactic was not dispensed with. In World War II, firebombing with incendiary bombs was carried out by the Germans against Britain during the Blitz, and by the Allies against Germany and Japan. After one heavy raid on Tokyo in March 1945, the resulting conflagration destroyed a quarter of the predominantly wooden buildings. Much as the Ancient Greeks before them, it was a strategy of devastation. Fire has continued to be used as a destructive measure in warfare. During the 1991–1992 Gulf War, Iraq set fire to three-quarters of Kuwait's oil wells.

Fire remained an extremely successful weapon. During naval warfare of the Napoleonic Wars, "the one thing most likely to destroy a ship was fire". Sometimes the fires were merely a side effect of weapon technology. Early firearms proved incendiary in their use and could start fires. During the Peninsular War, both Talavera and Salamanca battlefields were wracked by tremendous grassfires, first started by the guns. At the Battle of Trafalgar, 1805, the French ship of the line Achille caught fire when musket-flashes from her own men's guns set fire to the tar and grease on the sail rigging; the ship eventually exploded.

Smoke screens have continued to be used by attackers and defenders as a means of sowing confusion and hiding movements. During naval battles in the 18–19th centuries, shots were sometimes fired early so a defensive screen was erected before the ships converged, to spoil the aim of the enemy.

=== Development and continued use of weapons ===
The major development of weapons in the early modern and modern periods occurred with firearms, which became progressively more efficient. Gunpowder settled into its standard ratio in the 17th century, and general ballistic technology improved. Initially, iron round shot replaced the earlier stone balls for cannons then, latterly, different types of shot were invented.

A carcass was a hollow projectile usually formed either by an iron cage of ribs joining two small rings or a cast iron ball with holes. A carcass was so named because the iron cage was thought to resemble the ribs of a body. A carcass was filled with a highly flammable mixture. Carcasses were used for the first time by the French under Louis XIV in 1672.

For short range use against personnel, canister and the smaller naval grapeshot were popular during the 19th century; it comprised smaller iron or lead pellets contained within a case or bag, which scattered on explosion. In 1784, Lt Henry Shrapnel invented a spherical case-shot, which was later named after him. The case was a hollow iron sphere which was filled with musket balls and was detonated by a gunpowder charge. Shot fired from cannons could be so hot that it scorched or set fire to materials that it brushed.

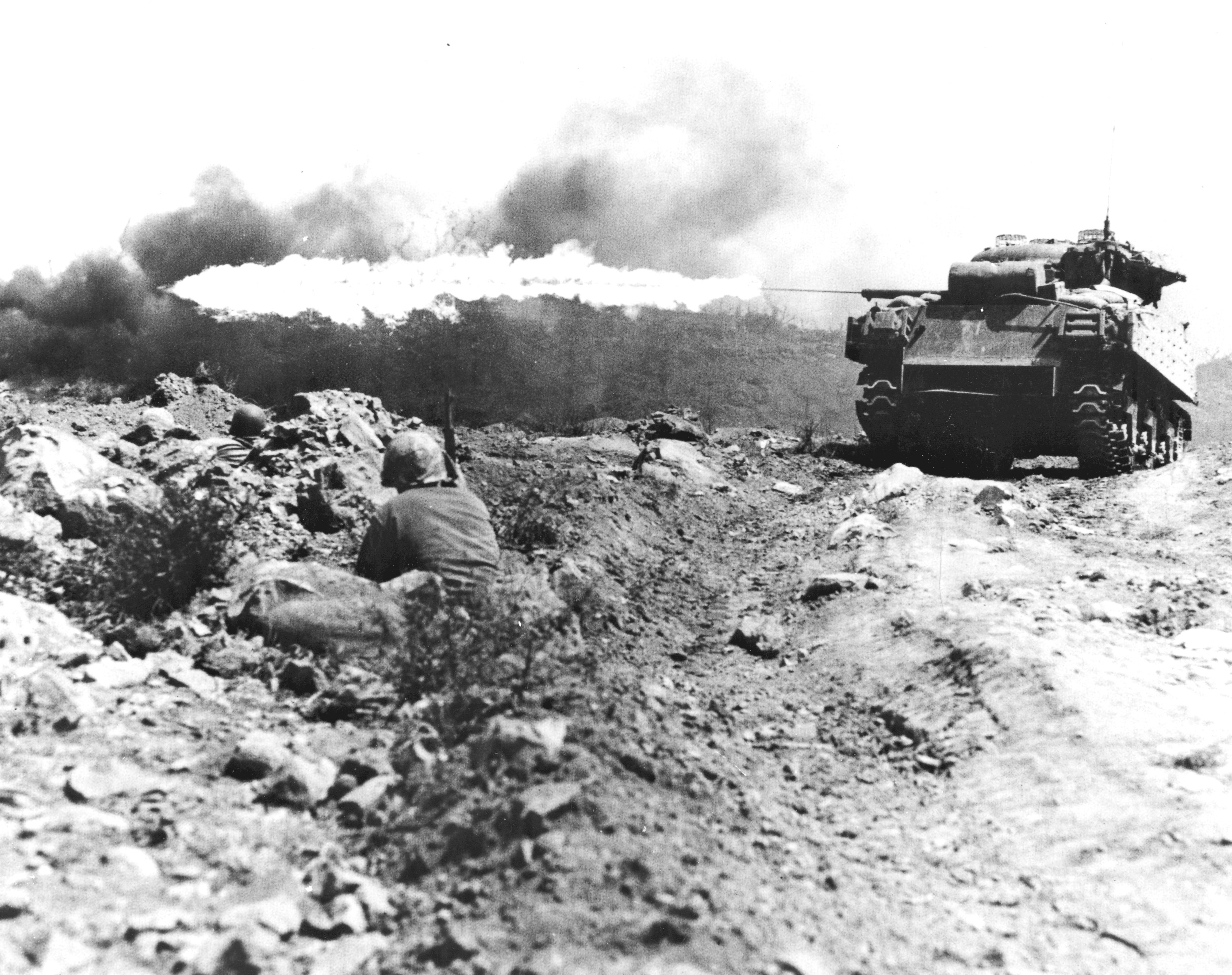
A flame tank at Iwo Jima, World War II

The incendiary liquids of the ancient and medieval periods were also developed, and have their modern equivalents. World War I saw the development of the flamethrower, a modern version of the Byzantine siphons, which used gas under pressure to squirt a mixture of inflammable oil and petrol, ignited by a burning taper. Similarly, the carcass projectile found new use in the Livens Projector, a primitive mortar that could throw a large canister of inflammable liquid (it was soon used for poison gas instead).

Technology improved throughout the 20th century, and the latter half saw the development and use of napalm, an incendiary liquid formed in part from naphtha, which was the main ingredient of the Arabic "naft".

Flames continued to be used for defensive light until artificial lights were developed. At the Siege of Badajoz in 1812, the French defenders flung down burning "carcasses" of straw so that the attacking British might be seen. Like the sieges of old, the British were met by incendiary weapons, but now these took the form of explosive grenades, mines and powder barrels as well as the enemy's guns.

Specific weapons from the ancient and medieval periods continued to develop, and many have modern equivalents. Rocket technology, originally trialled by the Mongols, Indians and the Chinese, amongst others, was improved by the 19th century; one example was the incendiary Congreve rocket, which had a tail, a fuse, and a powder charge (saltpetre, sulfur and carbon) inside a hollow shell. Grenades continued to develop, although still retaining some aspects of their medieval equivalents. The grenades carried on board British Royal Navy ships in the late 18th century and early 19th century were constructed from hollow cast iron, filled with gunpowder; the fuse was a hollow wooden tube filled with combustible material. During World War I, grenades were still occasionally launched by ballistae.

The use of some weapons continued with little change. The Koreans used fire arrows against the Japanese at the Battle of Hansan Island in 1592. At Trafalgar, in 1805, the British ship Tonnant shot wads covered in sulfur, which set fire to the Algésiras. Fireships were used in later periods. In 1588, the English sent fireships loaded with gunpowder, pitch and tar amongst the anchored Spanish Armada; the Spanish fleet broke formation, setting them up for the later battle. The last battle under sail was the Battle of Navarino (1827), part of the Greek War of Independence, during which fireships were utilised by the Turks.

Chemical warfare had been experimented with during the early period with sulfur, quicklime (calcium oxide), and others, and developments continued. World War I saw many gases used, including the extremely effective sulfur mustard (mustard gas).

== See also ==
- Petroleum Warfare Department
- Scorched earth
- Death by boiling
