= Firepot =

Firepot may refer to

- A method of cooking, as in Steamboat (food)
- A device for carrying fire
