= Athenaeus Mechanicus =

1st century BC author

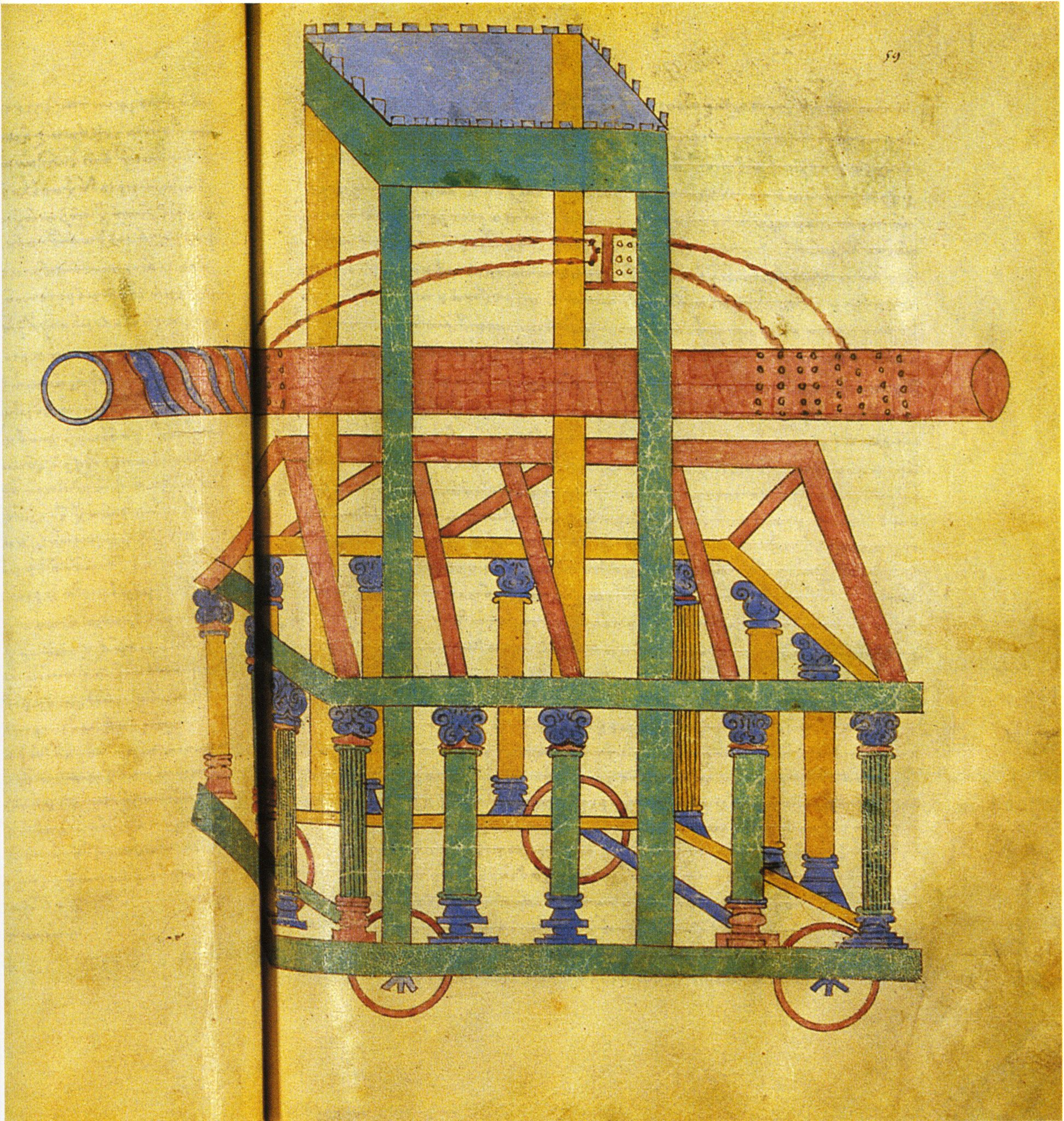
Illustration of a battering ram from an 11th- or 12th-century copy of On Machines

Athenaeus Mechanicus is the author of a book on siegecraft, On Machines (Ancient Greek: Περὶ μηχανημάτων, romanized: Perì mēchanēmátōn). He is identified by modern scholars with Athenaeus of Seleucia, a member of the Peripatetic school active in the mid-to-late 1st century BC, at Rome and elsewhere.

== Life ==
Strabo mentions a contemporary of his, Athenaeus of Seleucia, a Peripatetic philosopher. He was for some time the leading demagogue in his native city, but afterwards came to Rome and became acquainted with Lucius Licinius Varro Murena. On the discovery of the plot which the latter, with Fannius Caepio, had entered into against Augustus, Athenaeus accompanied him in his flight. He was retaken, but pardoned by Augustus, as there was no evidence of his having taken a more active part in the plot. He is perhaps the same person as the writer mentioned by Diodorus, a historian who mentioned Semiramis.

== On Machines ==
The treatise is addressed to Marcus Claudius Marcellus, and thus will have been composed before Marcellus' death in 23 BC (and possibly at a time when its addressee was preparing to go out on campaign). It describes a number of siege engines. Among the earlier mechanicians cited as sources by Athenaeus are Agesistratus, Diades of Pella, and Philo of Byzantium. Whitehead and Blyth analyze the treatise into a preface, a section on "good practice," a section on "bad practice," a section on Athenaeus' own innovations, and an epilogue "emphasizing preparation for war as a deterrent, and defending Athenaeus' own record against unnamed critics." The work is technical but not without signs of Athenaeus' philosophical culture: "He comes across as a philosopher, and he expounds about time and opportunity, but also claims to be enough of a technical expert to devise new machines, and to describe old ones accurately." Much of Athenaeus' work (9.4–27.6) is closely parallel to Vitruvius, De architectura 10.13–16, a fact probably to be explained by the two authors' shared reliance on a common source.

=== Influence ===
The tenth-century poliorketikon of Hero of Byzantium, Parangelmata Poliorcetica, draws on Athenaeus as a source.

== Editions ==
- Carl(e) Wescher, Poliorcétique des Grecs. Paris, 1867. (online: Google Books, archive.org)
- Rudolf Schneider, Griechische Poliorketiker. Abhandlungen der königlichen Gesellschaft der Wissenschaften zu Göttingen: philologisch-historische Klasse, neue Folge, 12:5. Berlin, 1912.
- George R. West, Athenaios Mechanicus, On Siege Machinery. M.A. thesis, University of British Columbia, 1969.
- David Whitehead, P.H. Blyth, Athenaeus Mechanicus, On Machines. Historia-Einzelschrift, 182. Stuttgart: Franz Steiner Verlag, 2004. ISBN 3-515-08532-7
- Maurizio Gatto (ed.), Il Peri mechanematon di Ateneo meccanico. Edizione critica, traduzione, commento e note. Aio 567. Roma: Aracne editrice, 2010. ISBN 978-88-548-3102-5
