= Callinicus of Heliopolis =

Greek architect and chemist

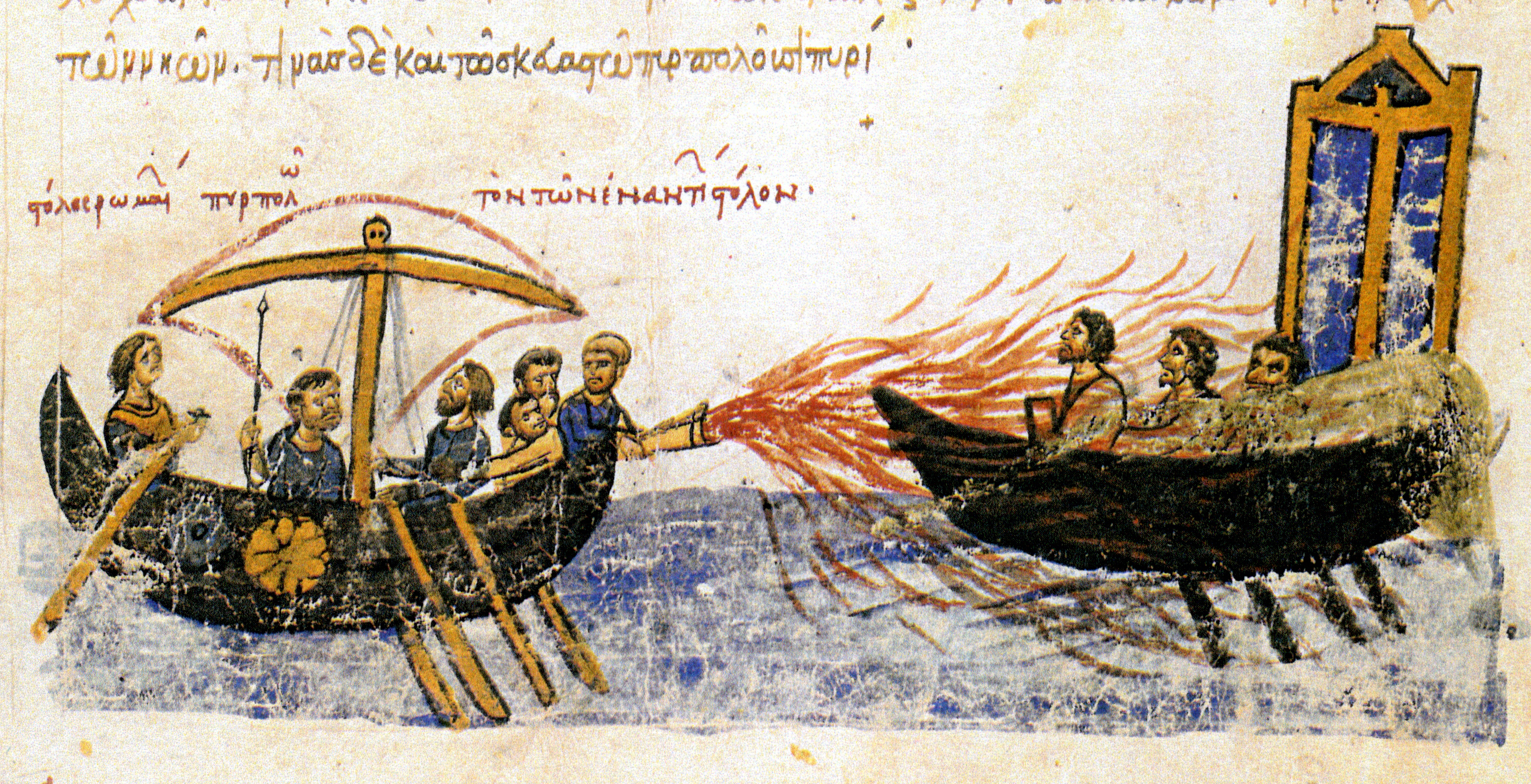

Callinicus of Heliopolis (Medieval Greek: Καλλίνικος fl. 620 AD) was a Byzantine architect and alchemist of Jewish origin from Syria. He is credited with the invention of Greek fire, the premodern precedent of the flamethrower.

According to Constantine Porphyrogenitus, he arrived in Byzantium in the time of Constantine IV and shared his knowledge of liquid fire with the Byzantines. Callinicus’ exact formula was a carefully guarded secret, and remains unknown today. Possible ingredients include resin, asphalt, sulfur, naphtha, fine quicklime, and calcium phosphide.

== See also ==
- 7th century in Lebanon § 670s
