= Agesistratus =

Ancient Greek mathematician and engineer

Agesistratus (Ancient Greek: Ἀγησίστρατος, romanized: Agēsístratos) was a prominent ancient Spartan mathematician and engineer flourishing around the 2nd century BC. He was a student of Apollonius of Perga.

Agesistratus particularly focused on military fortifications and the construction of war machines. He wrote the work "Siege Machines," specifically referring to "greater catapults". Agesistratus constructed the largest catapult of antiquity, whose effective range of a 1.85 m long javelin reached 4 stades, about 750 m, literally piercing any shield with a breastplate carried behind it. It is believed that no other war machine of antiquity could surpass this range. It is noted that in a modern attempt to reconstruct this catapult, with a 0.88 m long arrow (as opposed to the javelin used by Agesistratus), the range did not exceed 375 m.

The manuscript of Agesistratus has not survived. However, his work is mentioned by his student, also a mathematician and engineer, Athenaeus Mechanicus, as well as by the Roman architect Vitruvius.

== Bibliography ==
- Athenaeus Mechanicus (22 December 2015), "Athenaeus (2) Mechanicus", On Machines, doi:10.1093/acrefore/9780199381135.013.914, ISBN 978-0-19-938113-5 Vitruvius and Agesistratus
- Vitruvius, De Architectura – via The Project Gutenberg
- K. Georgakopoulos: "Ancient Greek Scientists", page 29, Georgiadis Publishing (1995).
