= Greek fire =

Byzantine incendiary weapon

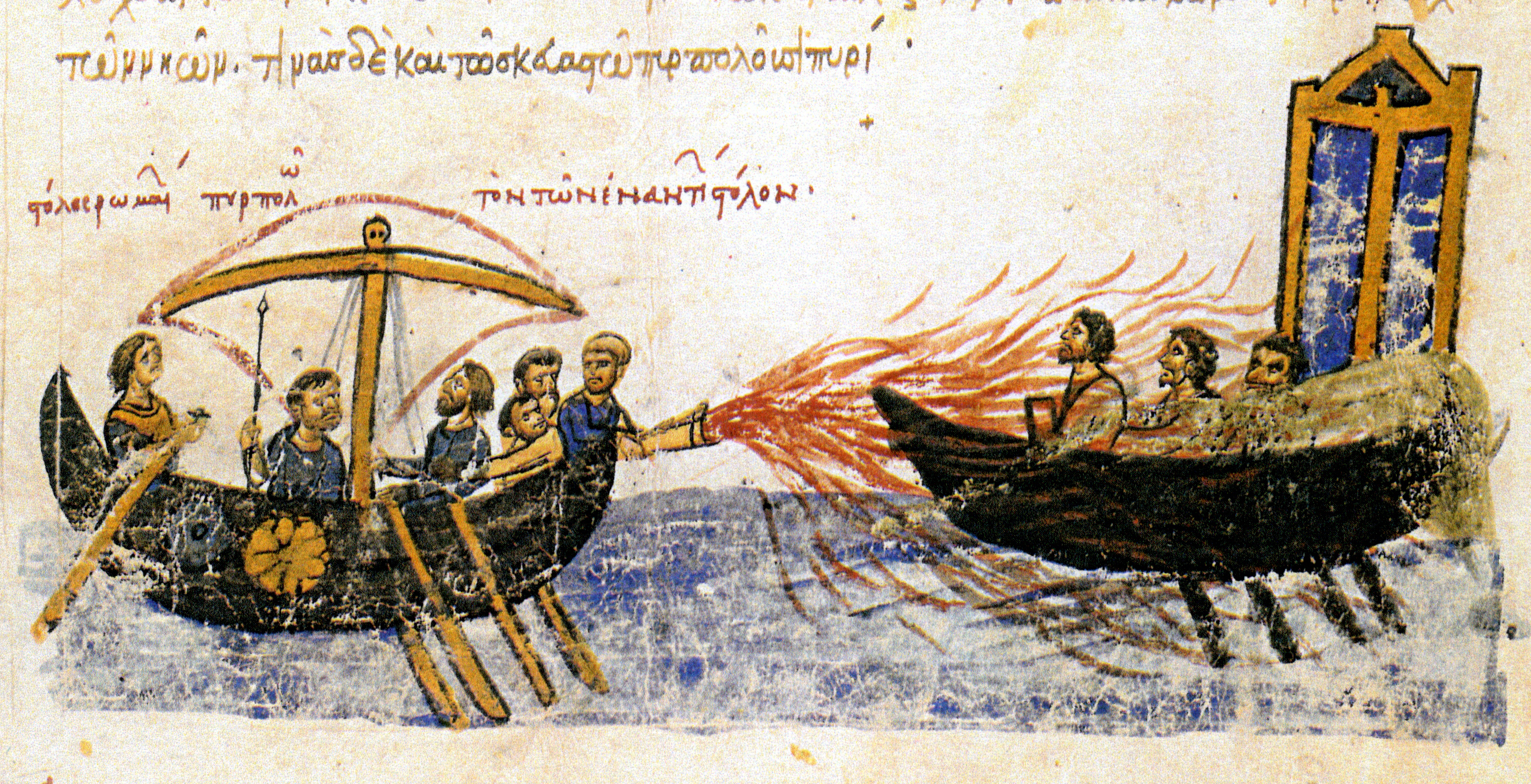
- "The Roman fleet burns the opposite fleet down" (Note: Medieval Greek: Στόλος Ρωμαίων πυρπολῶν τὸν τῶν ἐναντίων στόλον, romanized: Stolos Rhōmaiōn pyrpolōn ton tōn enantiōn stolon) – an Eastern Roman / Byzantine warship using their "secret weapon" Greek fire against a ship belonging to the rebel Thomas the Slav, AD 821 (12th century illustration from the Madrid Skylitzes)
- Type: incendiary
- Place of origin: Eastern Roman Empire

Service history
- Used by: Byzantine Empire
- Wars: First use in Siege of Constantinople (674–678)

Production history
- Designer: Kallinikos
- Designed: 672; 1354 years ago
- Developed into: Petroleum-based fire that stayed lit even on water
- Variants: Ship-mounted siphon ("flamethrower"); Cheirosiphōn (handheld version); Clay and glass grenades

Greek fire was an incendiary weapon used by the Byzantine Empire from the seventh to the fourteenth centuries. The recipe for Greek fire was a closely-guarded state secret and has been lost to history. Historians have variously speculated that it was based on saltpeter, sulfur, or quicklime, but most modern scholars agree that it was based on petroleum mixed with resins, comparable in composition to modern napalm. Byzantine sailors would toss grenades loaded with Greek fire onto enemy ships or spray it from tubes. Its ability to burn on water made it an effective and destructive naval incendiary weapon, and rival powers tried unsuccessfully to copy the material.

== Name ==
The term "Greek fire" has been common in English and most other languages since the Crusades. Original Byzantine sources called the substance a variety of names, such as "sea fire" (Medieval Greek: πῦρ θαλάσσιον pŷr thalássion), "Roman fire" (πῦρ ῥωμαϊκόν pŷr rhōmaïkón), "Median fire" (μηδικὸν πῦρ), "war fire" (πολεμικὸν πῦρ polemikòn pŷr), "liquid fire" (ὑγρὸν πῦρ hygròn pŷr), "sticky fire" (πῦρ κολλητικόν pŷr kollētikón), or "manufactured fire" (πῦρ σκευαστόν pŷr skeuastón).

== History ==
Incendiary and flaming weapons were used in warfare for centuries before Greek fire was invented. They included sulfur-, petroleum-, and bitumen-based mixtures. During the Siege of Petra (550–551) by the Byzantines, the defenders countered the siege engines by throwing fire pots made of sulfur, pitch, and naphtha. Incendiary arrows and pots or small pouches containing combustible substances surrounded by caltrops or spikes, or launched by catapults, were used in the Greco-Roman world. Thucydides mentions that in the siege of Delium in 424 BC a long tube on wheels was used which blew flames forward using a large bellows. The Graeco-Roman treatise Kestoi, compiled in the late 2nd or early 3rd century AD and traditionally ascribed to Julius Africanus, records a mixture that ignited from adequate heat and intense sunlight, used in grenades or night attacks:

Automatic fire also by the following formula. This is the recipe: take equal amounts of sulphur, rock salt, ashes, thunder stone, and pyrite and pound fine in a black mortar at midday sun. Also in equal amounts of each ingredient mix together black mulberry resin and Zakynthian asphalt, the latter in a liquid form and free-flowing, resulting in a product that is sooty colored. Then add to the asphalt the tiniest amount of quicklime. But because the sun is at its zenith, one must pound it carefully and protect the face, for it will ignite suddenly. When it catches fire, one should seal it in some copper receptacle; in this way you will have it available in a box, without exposing it to the sun. If you should wish to ignite enemy armaments, you will smear it on in the evening, either on the armaments or some other object, but in secret; when the sun comes up, everything will be burnt up.

In naval warfare, the Byzantine Emperor Anastasius I (r. 491–518) is recorded by chronicler John Malalas to have been advised by a philosopher from Athens called Proclus to use sulfur to burn the ships of the rebel general Vitalian.

Greek fire proper was developed in c. 672 and is ascribed by the chronicler Theophanes the Confessor to Kallinikos (Latinized Callinicus), a Jewish architect from Heliopolis, in Syria, by then overrun by the Muslim conquests:

At that time Kallinikos, an artificer from Heliopolis, fled to the Romans. He had devised a sea fire which ignited the Arab ships and burned them with all hands. Thus it was that the Romans returned with victory and discovered the sea fire.

Elsewhere, Theophanes reports the use of fire-carrying ships equipped with nozzles (siphōn) by the Byzantines a couple of years before the supposed arrival of Kallinikos at Constantinople. If this is not due to chronological confusion of the events of the siege, it may suggest that Kallinikos introduced an improved version of an established weapon. The historian James Partington thinks it likely that Greek fire was not the creation of any single person but "invented by chemists in Constantinople who had inherited the discoveries of the Alexandrian chemical school". The 11th-century chronicler George Kedrenos records that Kallinikos came from Heliopolis in Egypt, but most scholars reject this as an error. Kedrenos also records the story, considered implausible by modern scholars, that Kallinikos' descendants, a family called Lampros, "brilliant", kept the secret of the fire's manufacture and continued doing so to Kedrenos' time.

Kallinikos' development of Greek fire came at a critical moment in the Byzantine Empire's history: weakened by its long wars with Sassanid Persia, the Byzantines had been unable to effectively resist the onslaught of the Muslim conquests. Within a generation, Syria, Palestine, and Egypt had fallen to the Arabs, who in c. 672 set out to conquer the imperial capital of Constantinople. Greek fire was used to great effect against the Muslim fleets, helping to repel the Muslims at the first and second Arab sieges of the city. Records of its use in later naval battles against the Saracens are more sporadic, but it secured victories during the Byzantine expansion in the late 9th and early 10th centuries. Use of the substance was prominent in Byzantine civil wars, chiefly the revolt of the thematic fleets in 727 and the large-scale rebellion led by Thomas the Slav in 821–823. In both cases, the rebel fleets were defeated by the Constantinople-based central Imperial fleet, which used Greek fire. The Byzantines also used the weapon to devastating effect against the various Rus' raids on the Bosporus, especially those of 941 and 1043, as well as during the Bulgarian war of 970–971, when the fire-carrying Byzantine ships blockaded the Danube.

The importance placed on Greek fire during the Empire's struggle against the Arabs led to its discovery being ascribed to divine intervention. Emperor Constantine Porphyrogennetos (r. 945–959), in his book De Administrando Imperio, admonishes his son and heir, Romanos II (r. 959–963), never to reveal the secrets of its composition, as it was "shown and revealed by an angel to the great and holy first Christian emperor Constantine" and that the angel bound him "not to prepare this fire but for Christians, and only in the imperial city". As a warning, he adds that one official, who was bribed into handing some of it over to the Empire's enemies, was struck down by a "flame from heaven" as he was about to enter a church. As the latter incident demonstrates, the Byzantines could not avoid capture of their secret weapon: the Arabs captured at least one fireship intact in 827, and the Bulgars captured several siphōns and much of the substance itself in 812/814. This was apparently not enough to allow their enemies to copy it (see below). The Arabs used various incendiary substances similar to the Byzantine weapon, but were never able to copy the Byzantine method of deployment by siphōn, and used catapults and grenades instead.

Greek fire continued to be mentioned during the 12th century, and Anna Komnene gives a vivid description of its use in a naval battle against the Pisans in 1099. The use of hastily improvised fireships is mentioned during the 1203 siege of Constantinople by the Fourth Crusade, but no report confirms the use of Greek fire. This might be because of the Empire's general disarmament in the 20 years leading up to the sacking, or because the Byzantines had lost access to the areas where the primary ingredients were found, or perhaps even because the secret had been lost over time.

Records of a 13th-century use of "Greek fire" by the Saracens against the Crusaders can be read through the Memoirs of Jean de Joinville during the Seventh Crusade. One description of the memoir says "the tail of fire that trailed behind it was as big as a great spear; and it made such a noise as it came, that it sounded like the thunder of heaven. It looked like a dragon flying through the air. Such a bright light did it cast, that one could see all over the camp as though it were day, by reason of the great mass of fire, and the brilliance of the light that it shed."

In the 19th century, it is reported that an Armenian called Kavafian approached the government of the Ottoman Empire with a new type of Greek fire he claimed to have developed. Kavafian refused to reveal its composition when asked by the government, insisting that he be placed in command of its use during naval engagements. Not long after this, he was poisoned by imperial authorities, without them ever having found out his secret.

== Manufacture ==
=== General characteristics ===
As Constantine Porphyrogennetos' warnings show, the ingredients and the processes of the manufacture and deployment of Greek fire were carefully guarded military secrets. So strict was the secrecy that the composition of Greek fire was lost forever and remains a source of speculation. The mystery of the formula has long dominated the research into Greek fire. Despite this almost exclusive focus, Greek fire is best understood as a complete weapon system of many components, all of which were needed to operate together to render it effective. This comprised not only the formula of its composition, but also the specialized dromon ships that carried it into battle, the device used to prepare the substance by heating and pressurizing it, the siphōn projecting it, and the special training of the siphōnarioi who used it. Knowledge of the whole system was highly compartmentalised, with operators and technicians aware of the secrets of only one component, ensuring that no enemy could gain knowledge of it in its entirety. This accounts for the fact that when the Bulgarians took Mesembria and Debeltos in 814, they captured 36 siphōns and even quantities of the substance itself, but were unable to make any use of them.

The information available on Greek fire is indirect, based on references in the Byzantine military manuals and secondary historical sources such as Anna Komnene and Western European chroniclers, which are often inaccurate. In her Alexiad, Anna Komnene describes an incendiary weapon used by the Byzantine garrison of Dyrrhachium in 1108 against the Normans. It is often regarded as an at least partial "recipe" for Greek fire:

This fire is made by the following arts: From the pine and certain such evergreen trees, inflammable resin is collected. This is rubbed with sulfur and put into tubes of reed, and is blown by men using it with violent and continuous breath. Then in this manner it meets the fire on the tip and catches light and falls like a fiery whirlwind on the faces of the enemies.

At the same time, the reports by Western chroniclers of the famed ignis graecus are largely unreliable, since they apply the name to all incendiary substances.

In attempting to reconstruct the Greek fire system, the evidence from the contemporary literary references provides the following characteristics:

- It burned on water; according to some interpretations, it was ignited by water. Numerous writers testify that it could be extinguished only by a few substances, such as sand, strong vinegar, or old urine, some presumably by a sort of chemical reaction.
- It was a liquid substance – not some sort of projectile – as verified both by descriptions and the name "liquid fire".
- At sea, it was usually ejected from a siphōn, but earthenware pots or grenades filled with it – or similar substances – were also used.
- The discharge of Greek fire was accompanied by "thunder" and "much smoke".

=== Theories on composition ===
The first and, for a long time, most popular theory regarding the composition of Greek fire held that its chief ingredient was saltpeter, making it an early form of gunpowder. This argument was based on the "thunder and smoke" description, as well as on the distance the flame could be projected from the siphōn, which suggested an explosive discharge. From the times of Isaac Vossius, several scholars adhered to this position, most notably the so-called "French school" during the 19th century, which included chemist Marcellin Berthelot.

This view has subsequently been rejected, since saltpeter does not appear to have been used in warfare in Europe or the Middle East before the 13th century; it is absent from the accounts of the Muslim writers – the foremost chemists of the early medieval world – before the same period. In addition, the behavior of the suggested mixture would have been very different from the siphōn-projected substance described by Byzantine sources.

A second view, based on the fact that Greek fire was inextinguishable by water (some sources suggest that water intensified the flames), held that its destructive power resulted from the explosive reaction between water and quicklime. Although quicklime was known and used by the Byzantines and the Arabs in warfare, the theory is refuted by literary and empirical evidence. A quicklime-based substance would have to come in contact with water to ignite, while Emperor Leo's Tactica indicates that Greek fire was often poured directly onto the decks of enemy ships, although admittedly, decks were kept wet due to lack of sealants. Likewise, Leo describes the use of grenades, which further reinforces the view that contact with water was not necessary for the substance's ignition. Zenghelis (1932) pointed out that, based on experiments, the result of the water–quicklime reaction would be negligible in the open sea.

Another similar proposition suggested that Kallinikos had discovered calcium phosphide, which can be made by boiling bones in urine in a sealed vessel. On contact with water it releases phosphine, which ignites spontaneously. Extensive experiments with calcium phosphide also failed to reproduce the intensity described for Greek fire.

Consequently, although the presence of either quicklime or saltpeter in the mixture cannot be entirely excluded, they were not the primary ingredient. Most modern scholars agree that Greek fire was based on either crude or refined petroleum, comparable to modern napalm. The Byzantines had easy access to crude oil from naturally occurring wells around the Black Sea (e.g., the wells around Tmutorakan, noted by Constantine Porphyrogennetos) or from various locations throughout the Middle East. An alternate name for Greek fire was "Median fire" (μηδικὸν πῦρ), and the 6th-century historian Procopius records that crude oil, called "naphtha" (in Greek: νάφθα náphtha, from Old Persian 𐎴𐎳𐎫 naft) by the Persians, was known to the Greeks as "Median oil" (μηδικὸν ἔλαιον) or "Medea's oil". This seems to corroborate the availability of naphtha as a basic ingredient of Greek fire (the region Media was a chief source of naphtha).

Naphtha was also used by the Abbasids in the 9th century, with special troops, the naffāṭūn, who wore thick protective suits and used small copper vessels containing burning oil, which they threw onto the enemy troops. There is also a surviving 9th-century Latin text, preserved at Wolfenbüttel in Germany, which mentions the ingredients of what appears to be Greek fire and the operation of the siphōns used to project it. Although the text contains some inaccuracies, it identifies the main component as naphtha. Resins were probably added as a thickener (the Praecepta Militaria refer to the substance as πῦρ κολλητικόν, "sticky fire"), and to increase the duration and intensity of the flame. A modern theoretical concoction included the use of pine tar and animal fat.

A 12th-century treatise prepared by Mardi bin Ali al-Tarsusi for Saladin records an Arab version of Greek fire, called naft, which also had a petroleum base, with sulfur and various resins added. Any direct relation with the Byzantine formula is unlikely. An Italian recipe from the 16th century has been recorded for recreational use; it includes charcoal from a willow tree, saltpeter (sale ardente), alcohol, sulfur, incense, tar (pegola), wool, and camphor; the concoction was guaranteed to "burn under water" and to be "beautiful".

== Methods of deployment ==
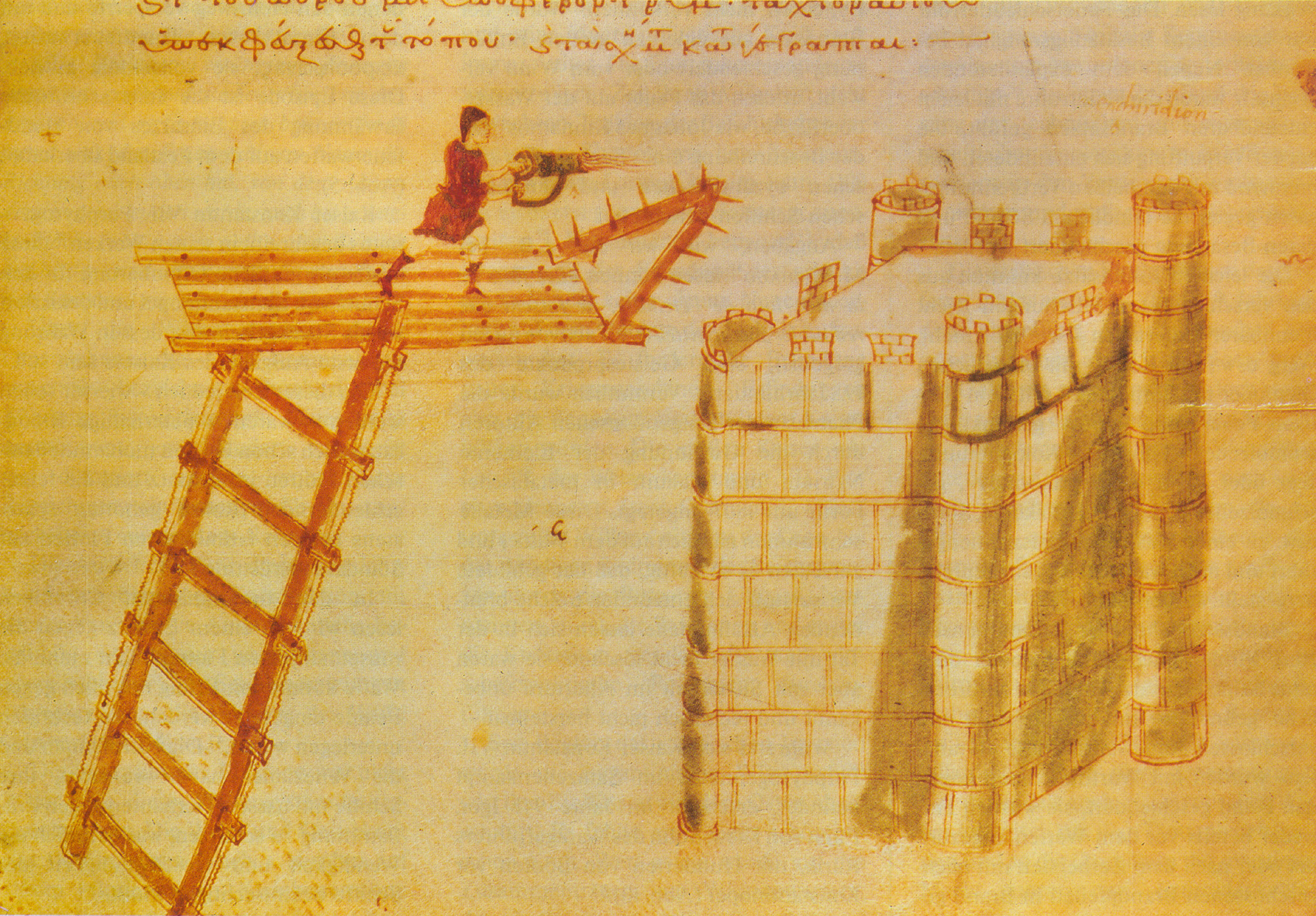
Use of a cheirosiphōn ("hand-siphōn"), a portable flamethrower, used from a flying bridge against a castle. Illumination from the Poliorcetica of Hero of Byzantium.

The chief method of deployment of Greek fire, which sets it apart from similar substances, was its projection through a tube (siphōn), for use aboard ships or in sieges. Portable projectors (cheirosiphōnes, χειροσίφωνες) were also invented, reputedly by Emperor Leo VI. The Byzantine military manuals also mention that jars (chytrai or tzykalia) filled with Greek fire and caltrops wrapped with tow and soaked in the substance were thrown by catapults, while pivoting cranes (gerania) were employed to pour it upon enemy ships. The cheirosiphōnes especially were prescribed for use at land and in sieges, both against siege machines and against defenders on the walls, by several 10th-century military authors; their use is depicted in the Poliorcetica of Hero of Byzantium. The Byzantine dromons usually had a siphōn installed on their prow under the forecastle, but additional devices could also be placed elsewhere on the ship. Thus, in 941, when the Byzantines were facing the vastly more numerous Rus' fleet, siphōns were placed also amidships and even astern.

=== Projectors ===
The use of tubular projectors (σίφων, siphōn) is amply attested in the contemporary sources. Anna Komnene gives this account of beast-shaped Greek fire projectors being mounted to the bow of warships:

As he [the Emperor Alexios I] knew that the Pisans were skilled in sea warfare and dreaded a battle with them, on the prow of each ship he had a head fixed of a lion or other land-animal, made in brass or iron with the mouth open and then gilded over, so that their mere aspect was terrifying. And the fire which was to be directed against the enemy through tubes he made to pass through the mouths of the beasts, so that it seemed as if the lions and the other similar monsters were vomiting the fire.

Some sources provide more information on the composition and function of the whole mechanism. The Wolfenbüttel manuscript provides the following description:

... having built a furnace right at the front of the ship, they set on it a copper vessel full of these things, having put fire underneath. And one of them, having made a bronze tube similar to that which the rustics call a squitiatoria, "squirt", with which boys play, they spray [it] at the enemy.

Another, possibly first-hand, account of the use of Greek fire comes from the 11th-century Yngvars saga víðförla, in which the Viking Ingvar the Far-Travelled faces ships equipped with Greek fire weapons:

[They] began blowing with smiths' bellows at a furnace in which there was fire and there came from it a great din. There stood there also a brass [or bronze] tube and from it flew much fire against one ship, and it burned up in a short time so that all of it became white ashes ...

The account, albeit embellished, corresponds with many of the characteristics of Greek fire known from other sources, such as a roar that accompanied its discharge. These two texts are also the only sources that explicitly state that the substance was heated over a furnace before being discharged; although the validity of this information is open to question, modern reconstructions have relied on them.

Proposed reconstruction of the Greek fire mechanism by Haldon and Byrne

Based on these descriptions and the Byzantine sources, John Haldon and Maurice Byrne designed a hypothetical apparatus as consisting of three main components: a bronze pump, which was used to pressurize the oil; a brazier, used to heat the oil (πρόπυρον, propyron, "pre-heater"); and the nozzle, which was covered in bronze and mounted on a swivel (στρεπτόν, strepton). The brazier, burning a match of linen or flax that produced intense heat and the characteristic thick smoke, was used to heat oil and the other ingredients in an airtight tank above it, a process that also helped to dissolve the resins into a fluid mixture. The substance was pressurized by the heat and the use of a force pump. After it had reached the proper pressure, a valve connecting the tank to the swivel was opened, and the mixture was discharged from the swivel, ignited at its mouth by a flame. The intense heat of the flame made the presence of heat shields made of iron (βουκόλια, boukolia) necessary, which are attested in the fleet inventories.

The process of operating Haldon and Byrne's design was fraught with danger, as the mounting pressure could easily cause the heated oil tank to explode, a flaw that was not recorded as a problem with the historical fire weapon. In the experiments conducted by Haldon in 2002 for the episode "Fireship" of the television series Machines Times Forgot, even modern welding techniques failed to secure adequate insulation of the bronze tank under pressure. This led to the pressure pump being relocated between the tank and the nozzle. The full-scale device built on this basis established the effectiveness of the mechanism's design, even with the simple materials and techniques available to the Byzantines. The experiment used crude oil mixed with wood resins; it achieved a flame temperature of over 1,000 °C (1,830 °F) and an effective range of up to 15 meters (49 ft).

=== Hand-held projectors ===
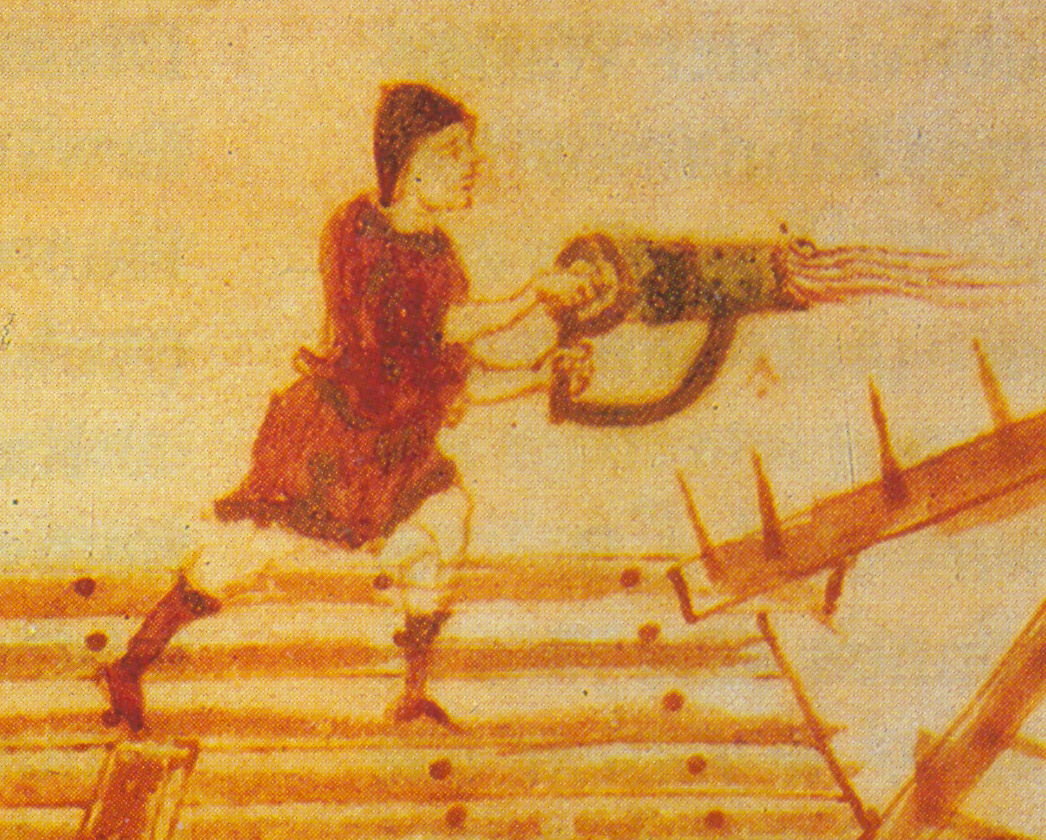
Detail of a cheirosiphōn

The portable cheirosiphōn ("hand-siphōn"), the earliest analogue to a modern flamethrower, is extensively attested in the military documents of the 10th century, and recommended for use in both sea and land. They first appear in the Tactica of Emperor Leo VI the Wise, who claims to have invented them. Subsequent authors continued to refer to the cheirosiphōnes, especially for use against siege towers; Nikephoros II Phokas also advises their use in field armies, to disrupt the enemy formation. Although both Leo VI and Nikephoros Phokas claim that the substance used in the cheirosiphōnes was the same as in the static devices used on ships, Haldon and Byrne consider that the former were manifestly different from their larger cousins, and theorize that the device was fundamentally different, "a simple syringe [that] squirted both liquid fire (presumably unignited) and noxious juices to repel enemy troops". The illustrations of Hero's Poliorcetica show the cheirosiphōn also throwing the ignited substance.

=== Grenades ===
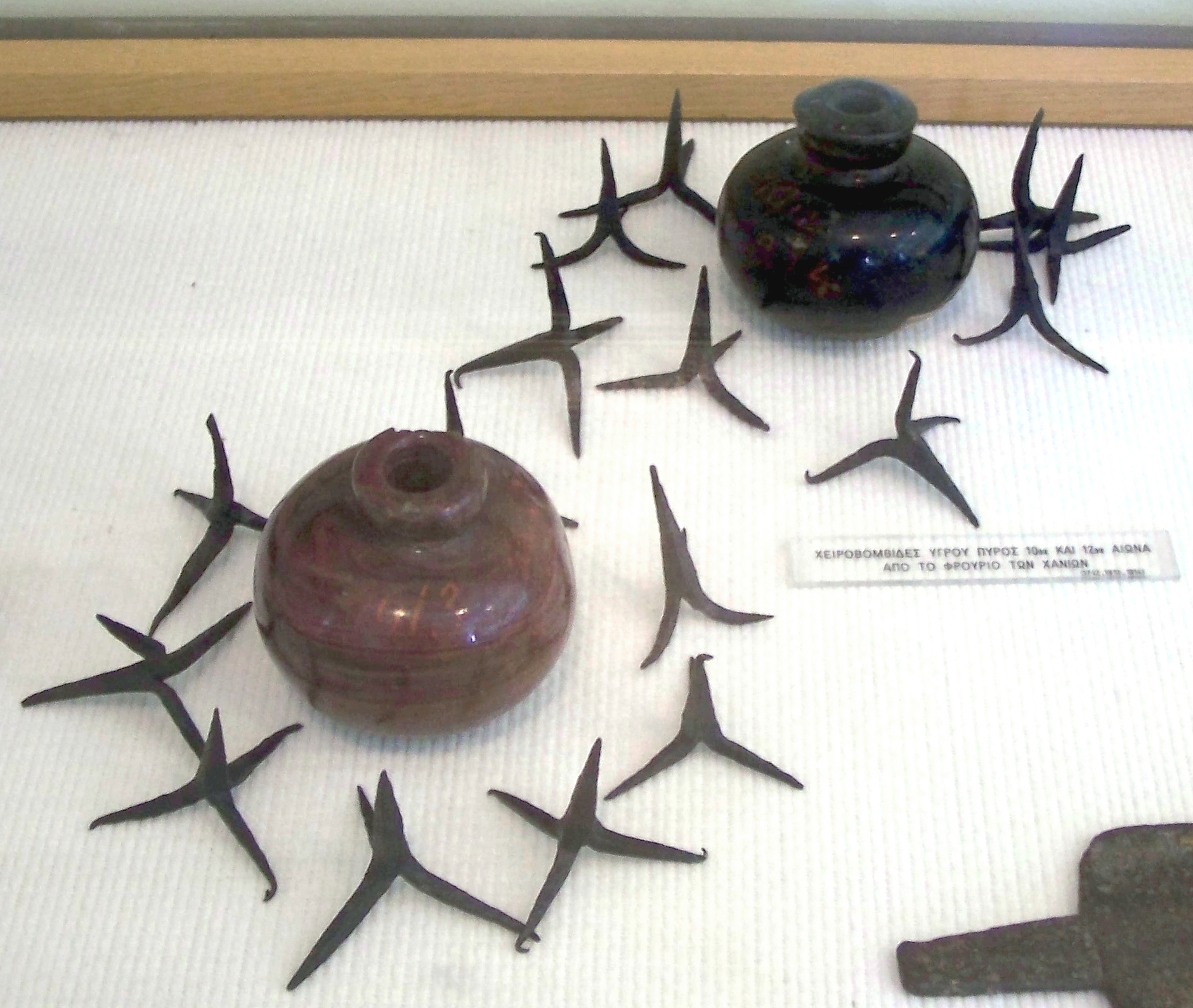
Ceramic grenades that were filled with Greek fire, surrounded by caltrops, 10th–12th century, National Historical Museum, Athens, Greece

In its earliest form, Greek fire was hurled onto enemy forces by firing a burning cloth-wrapped ball, perhaps containing a flask, using a form of light catapult, most probably a seaborne variant of the Roman light catapult or onager. These were capable of hurling loads of around 6 to 9 kg (13 to 20 lb) a distance of 350–450 m (380–490 yd).

== Effectiveness and countermeasures ==
Although the destructiveness of Greek fire is indisputable, it did not make the Byzantine navy invincible. It was not, in the words of naval historian John Pryor, a "ship-killer" comparable to the naval ram, which, by then, had fallen out of use. While Greek fire remained a potent weapon, its limitations were significant when compared to more traditional forms of artillery: in its siphōn-deployed version, it had a limited range, and it could be used safely only in a calm sea and with favorable wind conditions.

The Muslim navies eventually adapted to it by staying out of its effective range and devising protective measures, such as felt or hides soaked in vinegar.

Nevertheless, it was still a decisive weapon in many battles. John Julius Norwich wrote: "It is impossible to exaggerate the importance of Greek fire in Byzantine history."

== In literature ==
- In William Golding's 1958 play The Brass Butterfly, adapted from his novella Envoy Extraordinary, the Greek inventor Phanocles demonstrates explosives to the Roman Emperor. The Emperor decides that his empire is not ready for this or for Phanocles's other inventions and sends him on "a slow boat to China".
- In Victor Canning's stage play Honour Bright (1960), the crusader Godfrey of Ware returns with a casket of Greek fire given to him by an old man in Athens.
- In Rick Riordan's Camp Half-Blood Chronicles stories, Greek fire is described as being a volatile green liquid. When it explodes, the entire substance is spread out over an area and burns continuously. It is very strong and dangerous.
- In C. J. Sansom's historical mystery novel Dark Fire, Thomas Cromwell sends the lawyer Matthew Shardlake to recover the secret of Greek fire, following its discovery in the library of a dissolved London monastery.
- In Michael Crichton's sci-fi novel Timeline, Professor Edward Johnston is stuck in the past in 14th-century Europe, and claims to know Greek fire (or, in the novel, a variant called the "automatic fire" or "fire of Athênaios of Naukratis").
- In Mika Waltari's novel The Dark Angel, some old men who are the last ones who know the secret of Greek fire are mentioned as present in the last Christian services held in Hagia Sophia before the Fall of Constantinople. The narrator is told that, in the event of the city's fall, they will be killed to keep the secret from the Turks.
- In George R. R. Martin's fantasy series of novels A Song of Ice and Fire, and its television adaptation Game of Thrones, wildfire is similar to Greek fire, though it burns with a green flame. It is used in naval battles as it can remain lit on water, and its recipe is closely guarded.
- In Guy Gavriel Kay's The Sarantine Mosaic, a fantasy duology roughly based on the 10th-century Byzantine Empire, Sarantine fire (analogous to Greek fire) is deployed through tanks and nozzles to accomplish two assassinations.

== In popular culture ==
- Greek fire is used by Blackbeard's ship, Queen Anne's Revenge, in the 2011 film Pirates of the Caribbean: On Stranger Tides.
- An application of Greek fire is shown in the 2011 Ubisoft video game Assassin's Creed: Revelations when the main character, Ezio Auditore, escapes from the port of Constantinople using a hand projector located on an Ottoman ship.
- Greek fire appears in the 2015 Crystal Dynamics video game Rise of the Tomb Raider, where it is used as a weapon by soldiers in the fictional city of Kitezh.

== See also ==
- List of Byzantine inventions
- List of flamethrowers
- List of lost inventions
- Molotov cocktail
- Archimedes' heat ray
