= Fire pot =

Container for carrying fire

A fire pot is a container, usually earthenware, for carrying fire. Fire pots have been used since prehistoric times to transport fire from one place to another, for warmth while on the move, for cooking, in religious ceremonies and even as weapons of war.

== Early times ==
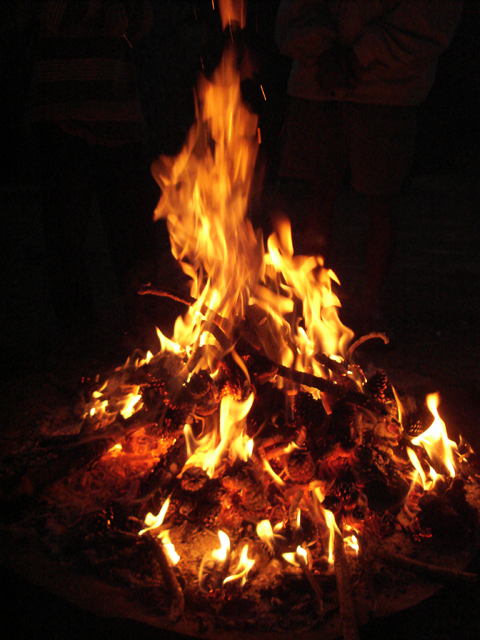
Campfire

Fire pots were vital to the development of civilization. Once humans had learned to contain, control and sustain fires, they had an invaluable tool for cooking food that would have otherwise not been edible. Fire pots were also useful for sharpening spears, hollowing out canoes, baking pottery, and many other tasks, such as staying warm.

At first, humans relied on natural fires, caused by lightning strikes or other natural occurrences, to provide them with a flame to start their own fires. Since natural fires are not very common, humans learned how to make fires by igniting tinder from sparks caused by striking stones together, or by creating friction using a bow drill.

Given the time-consuming nature of early firestarting, humans eventually began to use earthenware vessels, or fire pots, in which slow-burning fires could be kept alight indefinitely by using small quantities of fuel. Nomadic people could carry these small fires with them, using them to start larger fires for their evening camps.

Archaeologists found that fire pots were being used 10,000, or more, years ago, according to finds during the 1936-37 dig in Fells Cave , of which is located in the valley of the Rio Chico, not far from the Strait of Magellan.

Semi-nomadic and sedentary people would have made or acquired more advanced types of fire pots, as opposed to the fully nomadic people who would have used more primitive types. Being more sedentary, people were able to more effectively work with clay, and would have kilns to bake the pottery in, instead of using the traditional fire-baking methods.

== Warmth ==
Portable fire pots have long been used as a source of warmth.

=== Kangdi ===
A kangdi, also known as kanger or kangri, is a traditional earthen fire pot from Kashmir, used to warm the hands or feet. In Kashmir, in winter, people usually wear a "Phiran" or long woolen gown over their normal dress. To keep the inside of the Phiran warm, they sometimes use a Manann, a fire-pot made of clay. But with no insulation on its clay handles, the Manann is inconvenient.

A Kangdi is an improved version of the Manann, a semi-spherical clay pot enclosed in willow rushes, with handles also made of willow rushes. The pot holds burning coals that stay warm throughout the day. Throughout Kashmir in winter, it is common to see people with one hand holding their Kangdi inside their Phiran, doing the daily chores with the other.

== Cooking ==
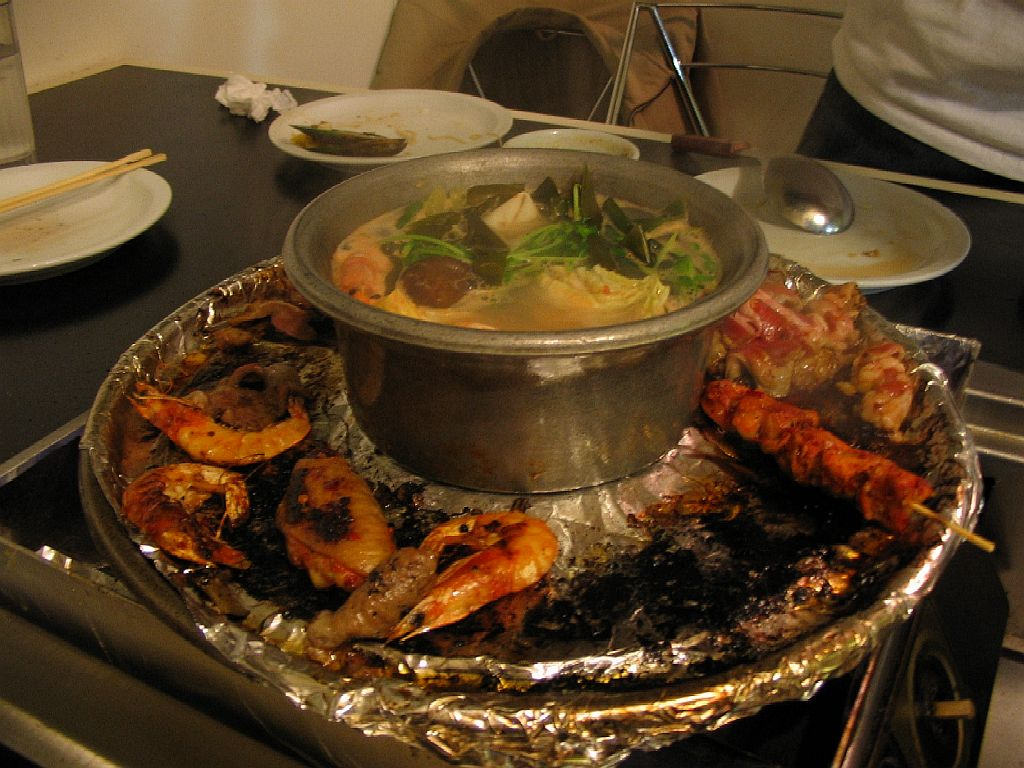
Hot pot with grill surrounding it

The fire pot was probably invented long after people discovered the value of cooking over fire. Once fire-proof containers became available, such as iron pots, it was natural to design fire pots that both heated and supported the cooking vessel. Over time, these developed into stoves, used both for cooking and heating.

=== Adogan ===
An earthenware fire-pot or indigenous stove found in West Africa , notably in Ilora and Oyo, an Adogan has a flat bottom with a carinated wall and an out-turned rim with three decorated lugs to support the cooking pot. A U-shaped hole is cut in one side to allow air to enter, and through which fuel is inserted.

=== Chinese hot pot ===
Hot pot or huoguo (Simplified Chinese: 火锅) is a traditional Chinese social meal. The literal Chinese translation is fire pot, as huo means fire, while guo refers to pot. The Chinese hot pot consists of a simmering metal pot of stock at the center of the dining table. While the hot pot is kept simmering, thinly sliced ingredients are placed into the pot and are cooked at the table. This type of cuisine is also referred to as "steamboat". In Western cooking, the fondue is used in a similar way, although usually with different ingredients.

== Warfare ==
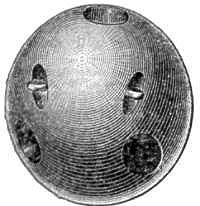
Drawing of a carcass shell

Small earthen pots filled with combustibles were used as early thermal weapons during the classical and medieval periods. Containers made at first from clay, later from cast iron, known as 'carcasses', were launched by a siege engine, filled with pitch, Greek fire or other incendiary mixtures. These fire pots could cause great damage to besieged cities with largely wooden construction.

In the Siege of Petra (550–551), the Sasanians countered the attackers and the siege engines by hurling fire pots containing sulfur, bitumen and naphtha ("oil of Medea")—an early form of chemical weapon acting like a "modern napalm".

A description of how to make military fire pots is given in Lucar, 1588, cited by Martin 1994:207-217

"Make great and small earthen pots which must be but half baked, and like unto the picture in the mergent . . . . Fill every of those pots half with grosse gunpowder pressed down hard, and with one of the five several mixtures next following in this Chapter, fill up the other half of those pottes: This done, cover the mouth of every pot with a piece of canvass bound hard about the mouth of the pot, and well imbued in melted brimstone. Also tie round about the middle of every pot a packthreed, and then hang upon the same packthreed round about the pot so many Gunmatches of a finger length as you will, & when you wil throe any of these pottes among enemies, light the same gun-matches that they may so soone as the pot is broken with his fall uppon the ground, fire the mixture of the potte. Or rather put fire to the mixture at the mouth of the pot, & by so doing make the same to burn before you doe throe the potte from you, because it is a better and more surer way than the other: I meane than to fire the said mixture after the pot is broken with burning gunmatches. Moreover this is to be noted, that the small pottes do serve for to be throne out of one ship into an other in fight upon the sea, and that the great pots are to be used in service upon the land for the defence of towns, fortes, walls, and gates, and to burn such things as the enemies shall throe into ditches for to fill up the same ditches, and also to destroy enemies in their trenches and campes"

By the mid-17th century, fire pots had largely been replaced by shells filled with explosives, which may be seen as the direct descendants of military fire pots.

== Religion and the arts ==
There is an element of mystery in fire, which at times has led to fire worship. Fire pots have been used in religious ceremonies for thousands of years . It would be inappropriate, and probably impossible, to cover all religious uses of fire pots in this article, but a few examples are relevant.

=== Censers ===
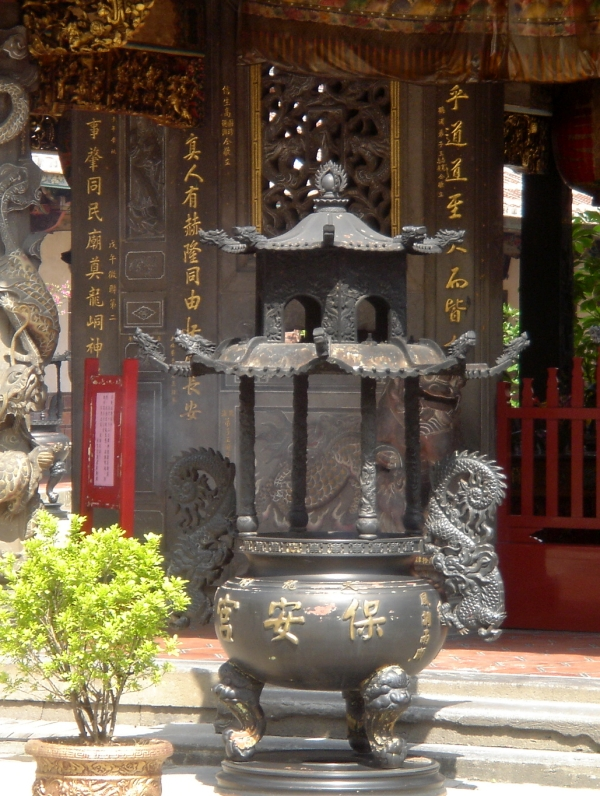
A large censer in front of a Taipei temple

A Censer is any type of vessel made for burning incense. They range from simple earthenware bowls to intricately carved silver or gold vessels, small table top objects a few centimetres tall to as many as several metres high. In many cultures, burning incense has spiritual and religious connotations, and this influences the design and decoration of the censer.

Before a Buddhist tantric ritual, an assisting monk may swing a censer or thurible as he passes to 'purify' the room. This is a container usually made of metal that hangs from three chains. Inside it, powdered incense that has been put on a smoldering bit of charcoal burns slowly, and the smoke escapes through pierced openings in the closed lid. One tradition says that during one of the Buddha's sermons a monk heedlessly swatted a mosquito. The Tathagatha is said to have ordered that, in the future, incense ought to be lit in order to keep the flies away, so that people could more easily concentrate on Dharma teachings, but also to prevent the needless taking of lives.

Censers are used in the Roman Catholic, Anglo-Catholic, Old Catholic and Eastern Orthodox sects of the Christian religion during important rituals such as benedictions, processions and important masses.

=== Early Jewish symbol of God ===
In Genesis 15, a chapter of the Bible , God instructs Abraham to cut a heifer, a she goat, a ram, a turtledove, and a young pigeon into halves. When it got dark, "a smoking fire pot and a flaming torch passed between the pieces", and later God made a covenant with Abraham granting him and his heirs extensive lands between the River of Egypt (either the Nile or the Wadi el Arish in the Sinai) and the Euphrates.

Texts from Mari in northern Mesopotamia from about the same period say that parties entering into a covenant would seal the agreement by cutting a donkey in half and then walking between the severed pieces. One interpretation of the ceremony described in Genesis 15 is that God made an unconditional covenant when God alone (symbolized by the fire pot, or the fire in it) passed between the two halves of the slaughtered animals.

=== Japanese Kodo ceremony ===
Kōdō (香道 - Way of Fragrance) is the Japanese art of appreciating incense, and involves using incense within a structure of codified conduct. Participants sit near one another and take turns smelling incense from a censer as they pass it around the group. Participants comment on and make observations about the incense, and play games to guess the incense material.

=== Sakthi Karagam ===
Sakthi Karagam is a dance performed in Tamil Nadu with a fire pot on the head in the Mariamman or Durga temple rituals. Today it is danced with a pot decorated with flowers on the head and is known as 'Aatta Karagam' and symbolises joy and merriment. In earlier times, the clay pot, or Karagam, was considered the residence of the local deity during the festival , which played a crucial role in community bonding. It is not clear whether the pot ever contained fire, or was so named because it was carried over fire by fire walkers.

== Descendants of the Fire Pot ==
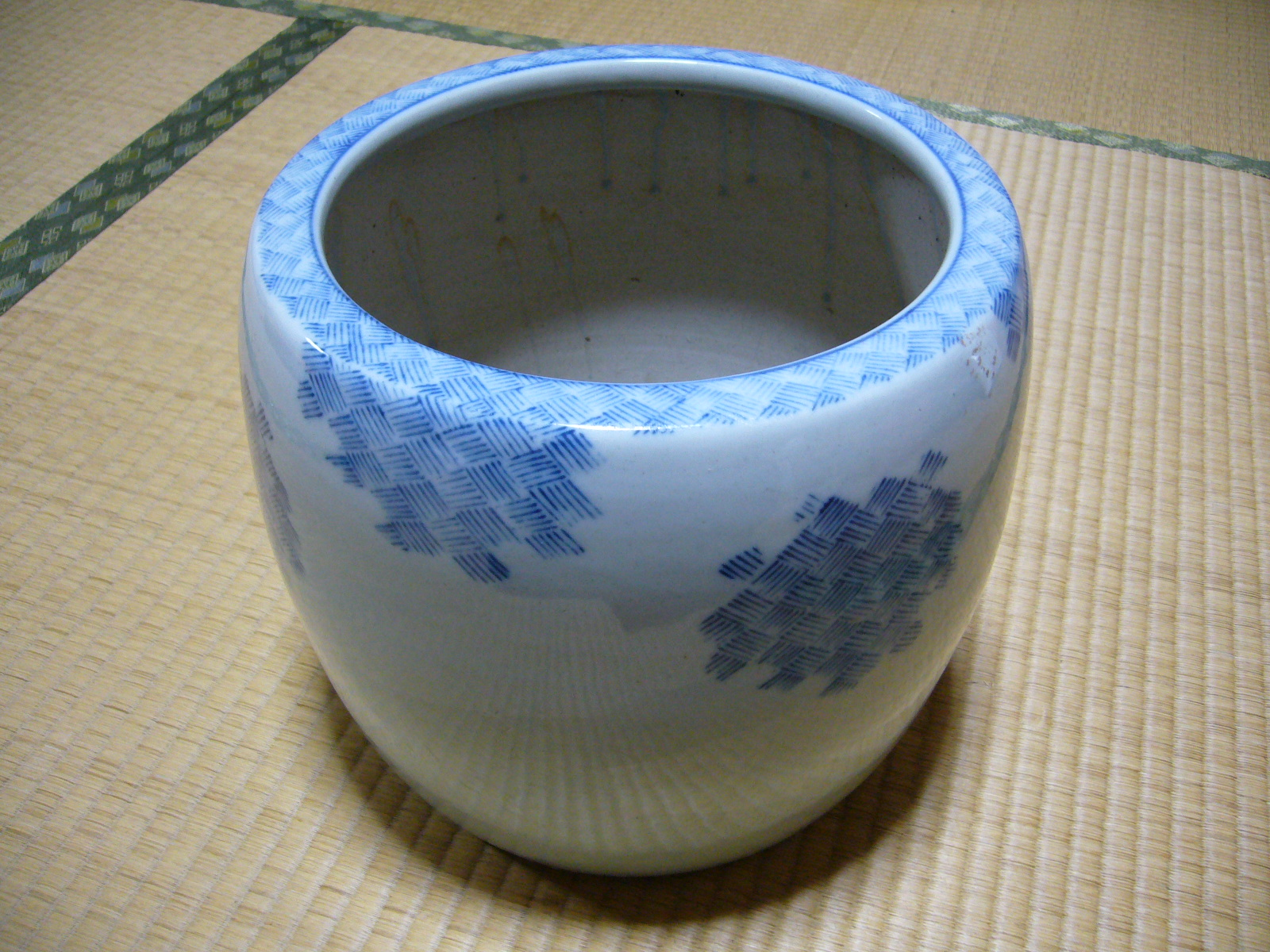
A porcelain hibachi

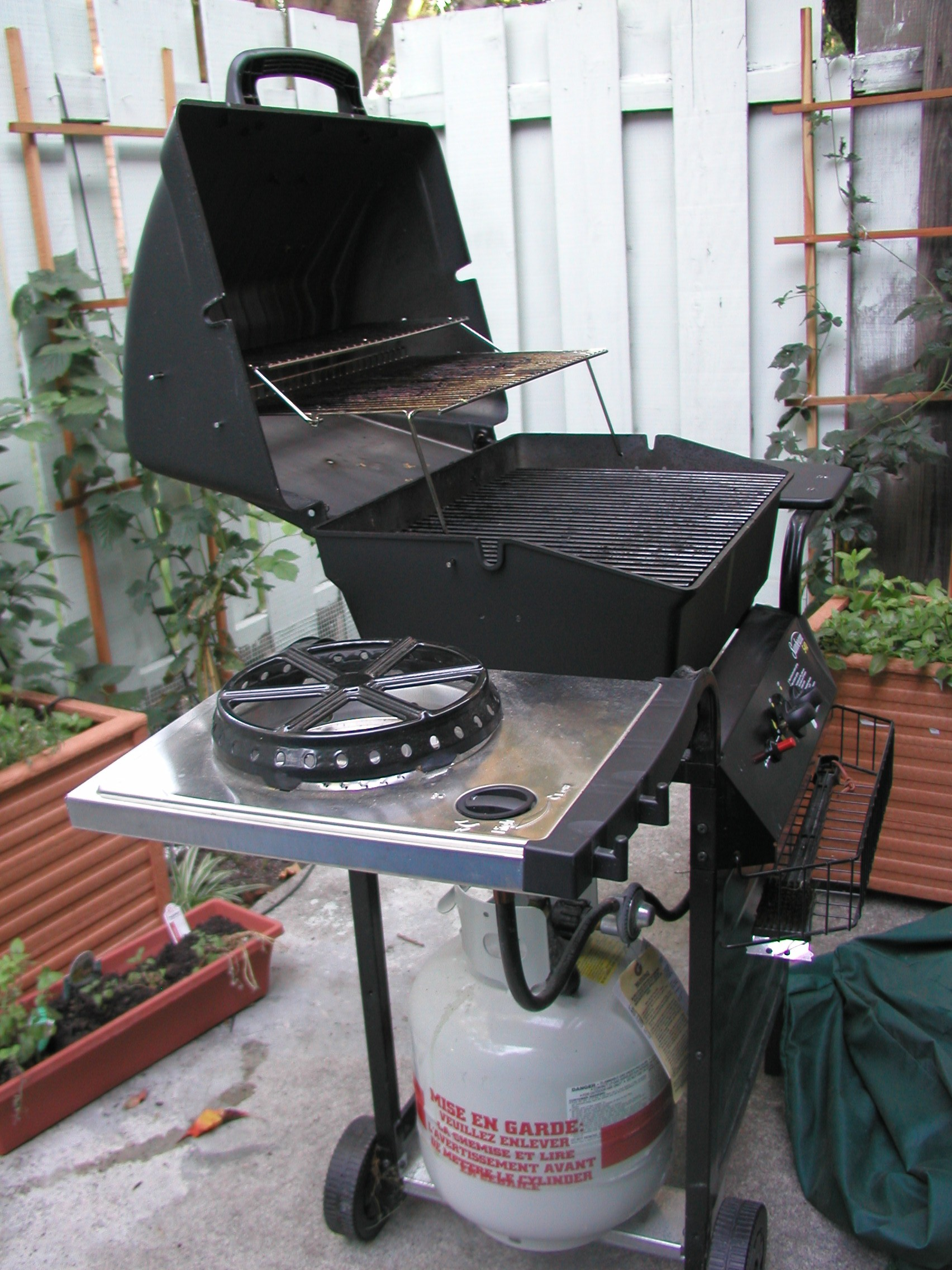
A typical propane barbecue grill in a backyard in California

Although the fire pot and its ancestor the fire pit are still in use in their original forms, successive technical refinements have led to many modern descendants whose origin in the simple clay container might be hard to guess. Some have been driven by the need to adapt to new fuels, such as charcoal, oil, coal, coke, kerosene, propane, electricity and microwaves. Others have been made possible through discovery of new materials such as iron, bronze, ceramics and asbestos. Always the motive would have been to improve the design, to make a device for managing fire that was cheaper, more robust, more convenient, more capable of meeting new demands. Often improvements made for industrial purposes found their way into improved cooking devices, and vice versa.

An incomplete list of fire pot descendants includes:

- Brazier: A standing or hanging metal bowl or box containing the fire, with perforations for ventilation. A Hibachi is a type of brazier.
- Stove: An enclosed space containing the fire, with dampers and regulators to adjust the draft and thus control the heat. A stove allows for cleaner, hotter and more efficient use of fuel than a fire pot or brazier.
- Oven: An enclosed compartment of a stove, separate from the fire, used for heating, baking or drying. Ovens may have their origin in the practice of enclosing food in clay or leaves before placing it in the fire, still used in Kalua, the traditional cuisine of Hawaii. Ovens make it practical to cook slowly, heating the food throughout, and are the basis of many types of cuisine. Ovens enable pottery and today are used in many industrial processes.
- Boiler: A closed vessel in which water is heated. The discovery that boilers could build up explosive pressure if too well sealed led to the invention of the steam engine, a pivotal technology in the Industrial Revolution.
- Barbecue: A device for cooking on a grill over a box containing burning wood, charcoal or, more recently, propane or natural gas.
