= Poliorcetica =

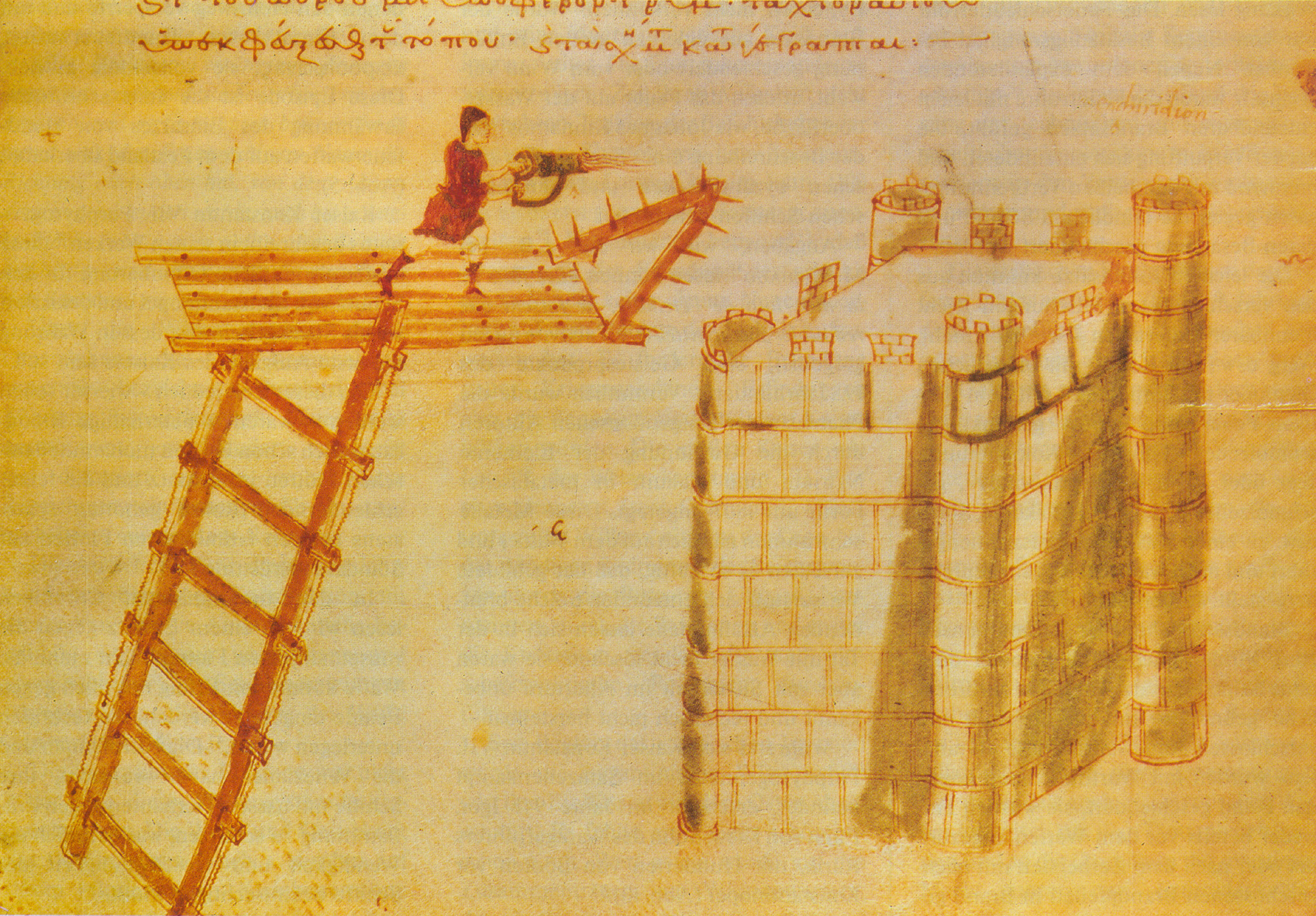
Use of a portable Byzantine flamethrower for Greek fire from atop a flying bridge against a castle. Illumination from the Poliorcetica of Hero of Byzantium.

A poliorceticon (Greek: πολιορκητικόν, also transliterated poliorketikon, poliorketika in the plural) is any member of the genre of Byzantine literature dealing with manuals on siege warfare, which is formally known as poliorcetics. As with much Byzantine literature, the poliorcetica tend to be compendia of earlier guides illustrated with Biblical and Classical anecdotes. The extent to which they might be up-to-date or representative of actual experiences in the field is sometimes questionable and greatly depends upon the author.

Composed as they were during the era immediately antecedent to the arrival of heavy artillery, the poliorcetica tend to focus less upon large machines and more upon techniques for bringing men close to fortifications, as well as on ways of undermining these once attacking forces are positioned. These Byzantine manuals also tend to give a good amount of insight on morale and advice on psychological defense employable by those being besieged, either to avoid betrayal or dissension harmful to successful and prolonged defense. They also cover means of avoiding one's own betrayal when invested by a siege.

Two examples of the genre are:

- Parangelmata Poliorcetica (Παραγγέλματα πολιορκητικά) of Hero of Byzantium
- De obsidione toleranda ("On Withstanding Sieges"), anonymous

Although not technically poliorcetica, other Byzantine military texts such as Kekaumenos's Strategikon and Nikephoros Ouranos's Taktika often include sections or chapters dealing with siege operations. Sources which were composed by soldiers or generals themselves are naturally the most invaluable of these for reconstructing actual procedures in the field.

The English word poliorcetic (relating to the siege of cities) derives from Greek poliorkētikos, from poliorkētēs "taker of cities" (from poliorkein to besiege, from polis city + herkos fence, enclosure).

== See also ==
- Byzantine military manuals

== Sources ==
- "Byzantine Siege Warfare in Theory and Practice" by Eric McGeer from The Medieval City under Siege
