= Hero of Byzantium =

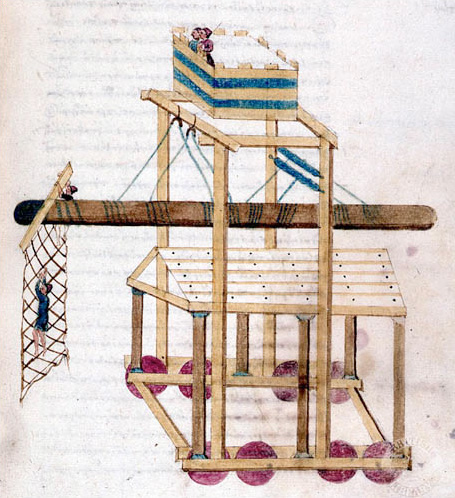
An Italian copy of one of Hero's diagrams.

Hero of Byzantium (Greek: Ἥρων), also Heron of Byzantium or sometimes Hero the Younger, is a name used to refer to the anonymous Byzantine author of two treatises, commonly known as Parangelmata Poliorcetica and Geodesia, composed in the mid-10th century and found in an 11th-century manuscript in the Vatican Library (Vaticanus graecus 1605). The first is a poliorketikon, an illustrated manual of siegecraft; the second is a work in practical geometry and ballistics, which makes use of locations around Constantinople to illustrate its points. The manuscript consists of 58 folios and 38 colored illustrations.

Following a seventh-century defeat by the Arabs in the east and the Germanic and Slavic powers in the west, the Byzantine Empire found itself gutted of much of its territory and needed to re-establish its military excellence. "Recent research has suggested that the empire first survived, and later expanded, by retaining and adapting military theories and practices from late antiquity." Hero's treatises were part of this process of recovery and adaptation.

== Name ==
There is no mention of the author's name in the treatises, and the numerous Byzantine references throughout the work indicate that the author cannot be Hero of Alexandria (d. c. 70 AD). Perhaps the name "Hero" came to be applied to him because of his use of Hero of Alexandria's work, which like his own deals principally with technology.

== Parangelmata Poliorcetica ==
The Parangelmata Poliorcetica was an adaptation of an earlier (c. 100 AD) poliorcetic manual of Apollodorus of Damascus, but in place of the static, two-dimensional diagrams of that work, the Byzantine author used a three-dimensional perspective and scaled human figures to clarify the passages. As artillery had not yet become a factor in siegecraft, the machines themselves tend to be those useful for advancing a force up to fortifications and mining them once situated. Hero includes tortoises (Ancient Greek: χηλῶναι—mobile sheds used to protect troops from attack while approaching fortifications); a new Slavic style of tortoise called the laisa (Ancient Greek: λαῖσα), created from interwoven branches and vines; palisades; rams; ladders; nets; towers; bridges; and tools such as augers and bores. In addition to the work of Apollodorus, the author also draws on the work of Athenaeus Mechanicus, Philo of Byzantium, and Biton.

== Geodesia ==
Geodesia or geodesy comes from the Greek word γεωδαισία (from γή, "earth", and δαΐζω, "divide"), literally meaning "division of the earth". When Hero of Byzantium wrote his Geodesia, he drew on an earlier manual by Hero of Alexandria—specifically on the Alexandrian's knowledge of applied geometry and use of the surveying instrument called the dioptra. Hero of Alexandria's manuscripts suggest that the dioptra could be used as a level and for measuring elevations, distances, and angles. Hero of Byzantium spoke about its use in siege warfare, showing that it could estimate distances and the required sizes of siege engines.

== Edition ==
- Sullivan, Dennis F., ed. (2000). Siegecraft: Two Tenth-Century Instructional Manuals by "Heron of Byzantium". Dumbarton Oaks Studies XXXVI. Washington, DC: Dumbarton Oaks Research Library and Collection. ISBN 0-88402-270-6.
