= Skoutatoi =

Heavy infantry unit of the Byzantine army

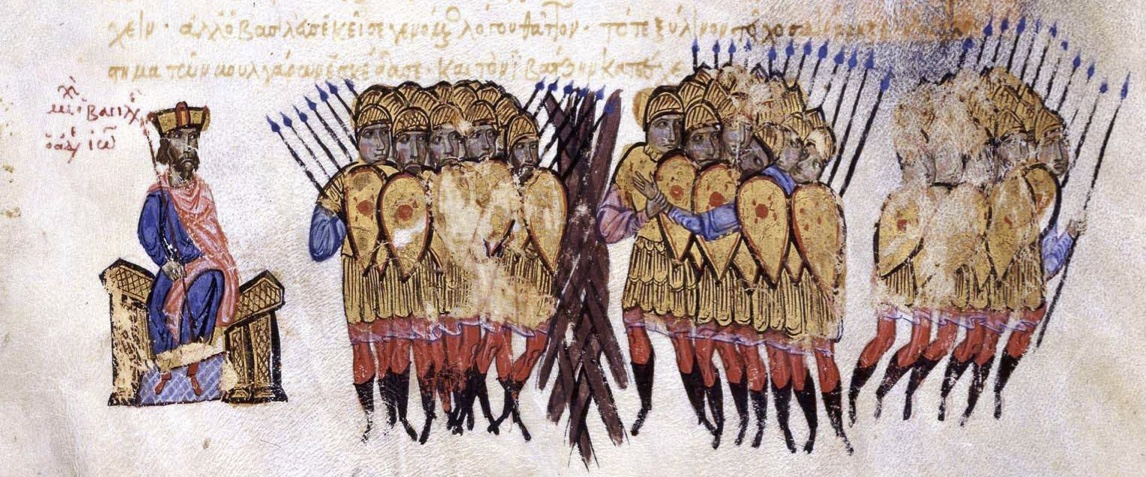
Depiction of the Skoutatoi with Michael IV in front of the Bulgarian barricade.

The Skoutatoi (Medieval Greek: σκουτάτοι) were heavy infantry troops of the Byzantine Empire, prominent from around the 7th to 11th centuries. Emerging during a period of military transformation, the Skoutatoi represented the continuation and adaptation of Roman infantry traditions into the medieval era, operating within a military system that increasingly emphasized combined-arms tactics.

In battle, the skoutatoi functioned as the main core of the Byzantine army. They were typically deployed in the center of the formation, where their task was to absorb enemy assaults and prevent breakthroughs. This made them particularly effective against cavalry charges, as their shields and disciplined ranks could blunt the momentum of mounted attacks.

== Etymology ==
The term Skoutatoi derives from the Greek word skouton (σκούτον), meaning “shield.” The name reflects their defining battlefield characteristic: the use of a large shield as part of tightly organized infantry formations. In essence, the skoutatoi were “those of the shield,” emphasizing their role as a defensive core, similarly to the Hoplites.

== Equipment ==
The equipment of the skoutatoi reflects their role as Byzantine heavy infantry designed for disciplined formation fighting rather than individual dueling or skirmishing. Their gear was built around durability, cohesion, and anti-cavalry defense, with the shield and spear forming the core of their battlefield identity.

The most important piece of equipment was the skouton, a large shield made primarily of wood and reinforced with leather and metal fittings. It was typically oval or kite-shaped depending on the period, with the kite shape becoming more common in later centuries due to its improved lower-body protection. The shield was designed for close formation use, allowing soldiers to overlap their coverage with those beside them. This created a continuous defensive front that could absorb missile fire and blunt cavalry charges. Its construction balanced protection with manageable weight, making it suitable for prolonged battlefield use.

=== Shield ===
The shield (skoutarion) came in several forms in the middle Byzantine period, with large 107–118 cm ovoid and circular shields like earlier classical examples mostly giving way to the smaller 50–80 cm circular shield and the 90–100 cm oblong kite shield(sometimes called a thyreos) shortly before 900 AD. The rectangular shield, in use since classical antiquity, is also mentioned textually by the Sylloge Tacticorum and evidenced in art. The Tactica of Leo VI states that shield patterns and tunic color was matched by regiment, a feature also evidenced in the earlier Notitia Dignitatum, a late Roman register of offices and military units from the late 4th to early 5th century.

Incidentally, some of those units are listed in the De Ceremoniis in its section on the expeditions to Crete and Italy in 911–949, including the Victores, the Theodosiaci, and the Stablesiani, although only the Victores can be identified with a specific unit with a shield pattern in the Notita Dignitatum. The majority of shield motifs took the form of geometric patterns, with radial bands, diamonds, Greek key motifs, and other forms all being popular. Inscriptions are also frequent on shields, typically in pseudo-Kufic script, but on occasions actual Greek inscriptions are also present. Crosses are also evidenced starting in the 12th century, as attested by Niketas Akominatos, and proto-heraldic patterns appear by the 12th–13th century, including lions and chequering. Stars and crescent moons are also attested, being native to the regions of Thrace, Anatolia, and the Peloponnese, with a red-and-white star and crescent being the signature motif of the Tzakones marines and guard regiment in the 13th–14th centuries.

=== Weaponry ===
The Skoutatoi were equipped as heavy infantry, and their weaponry was designed specifically for formation fighting, anti-cavalry defense, and close-order combat rather than individual dueling or skirmishing.

Their primary weapon was the Kontarion, a long thrusting spear (varied between 2.4 and 4 m (7.9 to 13.1 ft) in length). This was the most important offensive tool in their arsenal and defined how they fought. The kontarion was used by the first ranks of each chiliarchia (battalion) in order to form a defensive Macedonian like Phalanx. It allowed skoutatoi to engage enemies at a distance, especially cavalry, by presenting a dense wall of spear points in tightly packed formations. In battle, multiple ranks of soldiers could project their spears forward, creating a layered defensive and offensive barrier that was difficult to break through.

For close combat situations, when formations collapsed or fighting became chaotic, the Skoutatoi carried a secondary weapon, usually the Spathion, a straight double-edged sword inherited from earlier Roman military tradition, usually about 70 to 80 cm (2.3 to 2.6 ft) in length, depending on the period) based on early Greek and Celtic type of swords; double-edged and weighing up to 1.6 kg (3.5 lb). This sword was used for slashing and thrusting in melee combat. In some cases, soldiers may also have carried axes or other close-combat weapons, but these were not standard issue and likely varied depending on region, time period, or personal preference. Later it referred to the medieval arming sword, usually with a crossguard curving back towards the handle.

Unlike earlier Roman infantry, the Skoutatoi did not rely heavily on throwing weapons as a core part of their combat system. Their role was not to open battle with missile volleys, but to hold the line and engage at close range in coordinated formation combat.

=== Armory ===
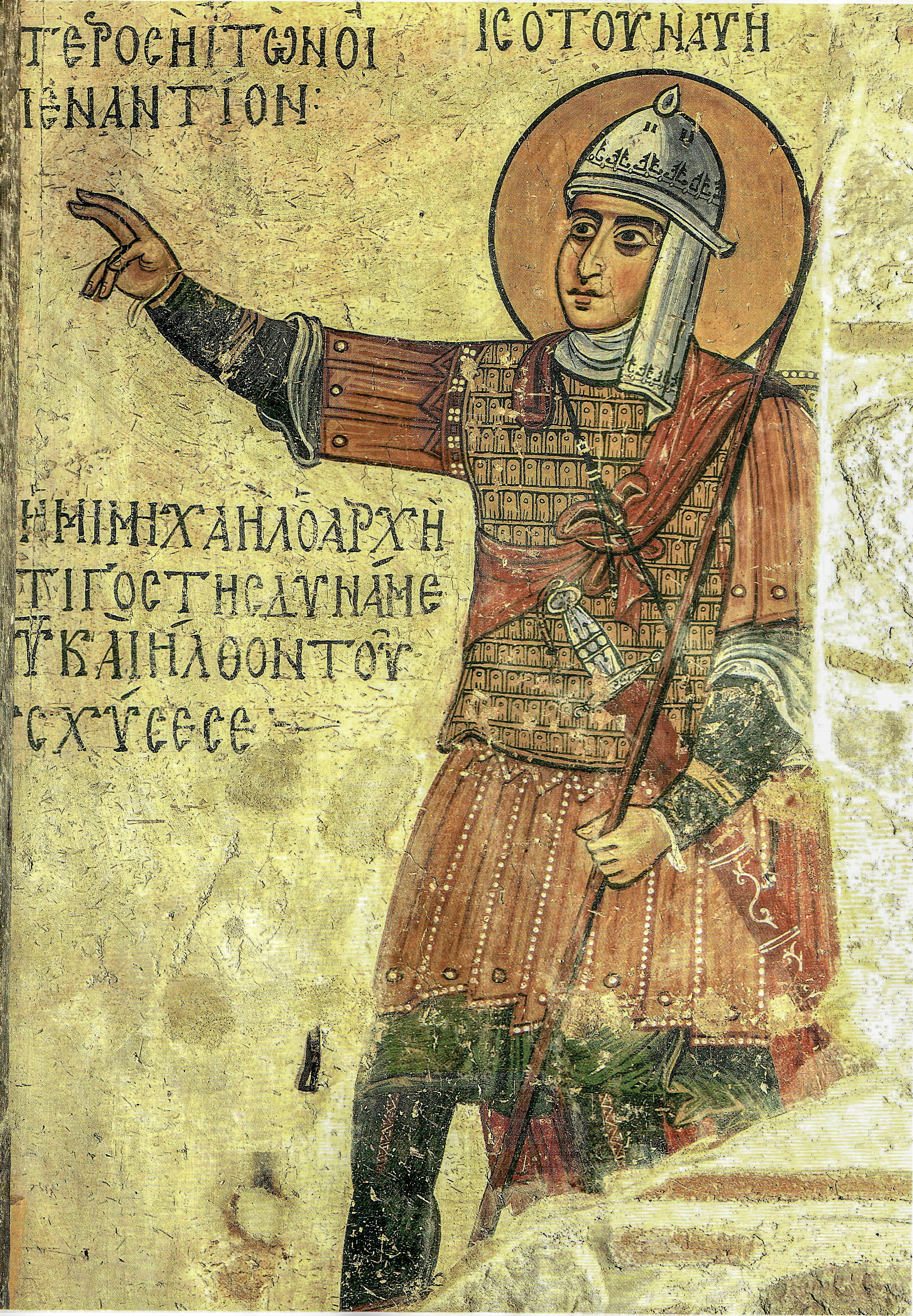
12th-century fresco of Joshua from the monastery of Hosios Loukas. It accurately depicts the typical equipment of a heavily armed Byzantine infantryman of the 10th-12th centuries reassembling earlier Hellenistic militaristic patterns of the Eastern mediterranean. He wears a helmet, lamellar klivanion with pteruges and is armed with a kontarion and a spathion.

The Klivanion (κλιβάνιον) was a central element of Byzantine body armour and is most commonly associated with the distinctive lamella cuirass used by heavy infantry and cavalry. In a broader sense, the term was sometimes used more generally to refer to body armor as a whole. The klivanion provided rigid protection against cutting and thrusting attacks through its construction of overlapping metal plates. In many configurations, it was also supplemented with Pteruges, which were hanging strips of leather or reinforced material attached to the lower edge of the armor to protect the hips and upper thighs while allowing mobility.

The Epilōrikion (ἐπιλωρίκιον) was an outer protective garment worn over the cuirass. It was typically made of padded leather or reinforced textile and served both protective and practical functions. By absorbing and dispersing impact from blows and reducing wear on the underlying armor, it enhanced the overall durability of the soldier's defensive equipment. It also helped reduce heat buildup and could provide an additional layer of cushioning in prolonged combat.

The Kavadion (καβάδιον), also known as the vamvakion (βαμβάκιον), was a padded undergarment worn beneath the cuirass. Constructed from layered linen or wool, it functioned as a shock-absorbing layer that reduced the impact of blows transmitted through metal armor. This under-armor padding was essential in mitigating blunt force trauma and improving overall comfort and endurance during extended campaigns or battlefield engagements.

The Helmet varied by region and time but was generally a simple, conical-shaped piece of steel, often with extra neck protection in the form of a mail aventail or padded coif.

== Combat ==
=== Formation ===
The skoutatoi were organized around deep, cohesive formations that emphasized defensive stability as the foundation of Byzantine heavy infantry tactics. According to the Strategikon of Maurice, infantry effectiveness depended on maintaining depth and disciplined close-order cohesion, allowing formations to resist cavalry and missile attacks while preserving formation. Modern scholarship reconstructs these deployments as dense, often rectangular formations in which front ranks engaged the enemy directly while rear ranks reinforced overall stability through depth. Although Byzantine sources do not describe formalized rank rotation, the emphasis on depth ensured that losses in the front lines could be absorbed without collapse of the formation. This tactical system prioritized endurance and cohesion over rapid maneuver or offensive dispersion.

Within these formations, the Skoutatoi used a Shield wall system based on the Skouton. Shields were overlapped laterally to form a continuous defensive barrier across the unit's front. This eliminated gaps between soldiers and significantly improved resistance against arrows, javelins, and cavalry impact. The shield wall was not only protective but also essential for maintaining unit cohesion under stress, effectively binding individual soldiers into a single defensive structure. They played a key role in stabilizing battle lines against enemy cavalry and also as an anchor to launch friendly cavalry attacks. According to Richard A. Gabriel, during the Byzantine–Sasanian War of 602–628 the Byzantine heavy infantry "combined the best capabilities of the Roman legion with the old Greek phalanx".

Offensive capability within the formation centered on the kontarion (spear), which was deployed in layered ranks. Front-line soldiers presented their spears forward, while those behind extended theirs over or between the first ranks. This created a dense spear hedge that increased both reach and defensive density. The result was a sustained barrier that was particularly effective against frontal assaults, especially from mounted troops attempting to break the line. At a higher tactical level, Skoutatoi were organized into cohesive infantry blocks that formed part of a larger battle line. These blocks maintained internal order while aligning with neighboring units to create a unified front.

Commanders could adjust spacing or integrate missile troops into or behind the formation depending on terrain and tactical needs, but the structural integrity of each block remained the priority. Although generally rigid, Byzantine tactics allowed for limited variation in formation layout, such as staggered or segmented arrangements. These adaptations were used to coordinate with archers or light infantry while preserving the strength of the main line. However, such flexibility was always secondary to maintaining cohesion and defensive reliability.

=== Fighting style ===
The tactical doctrine of the Skoutatoi emphasized depth, cohesion, and defensive stability, reflecting their role as the principal heavy infantry of the Byzantine field army. Byzantine military writings, particularly the Tactica of Emperor Leo VI describe infantry formations organized to maintain a continuous battle line capable of resisting cavalry charges and sustaining missile fire while preserving formation integrity. This approach prioritized cohesion and endurance in close-order combat rather than individual initiative or rapid maneuver.

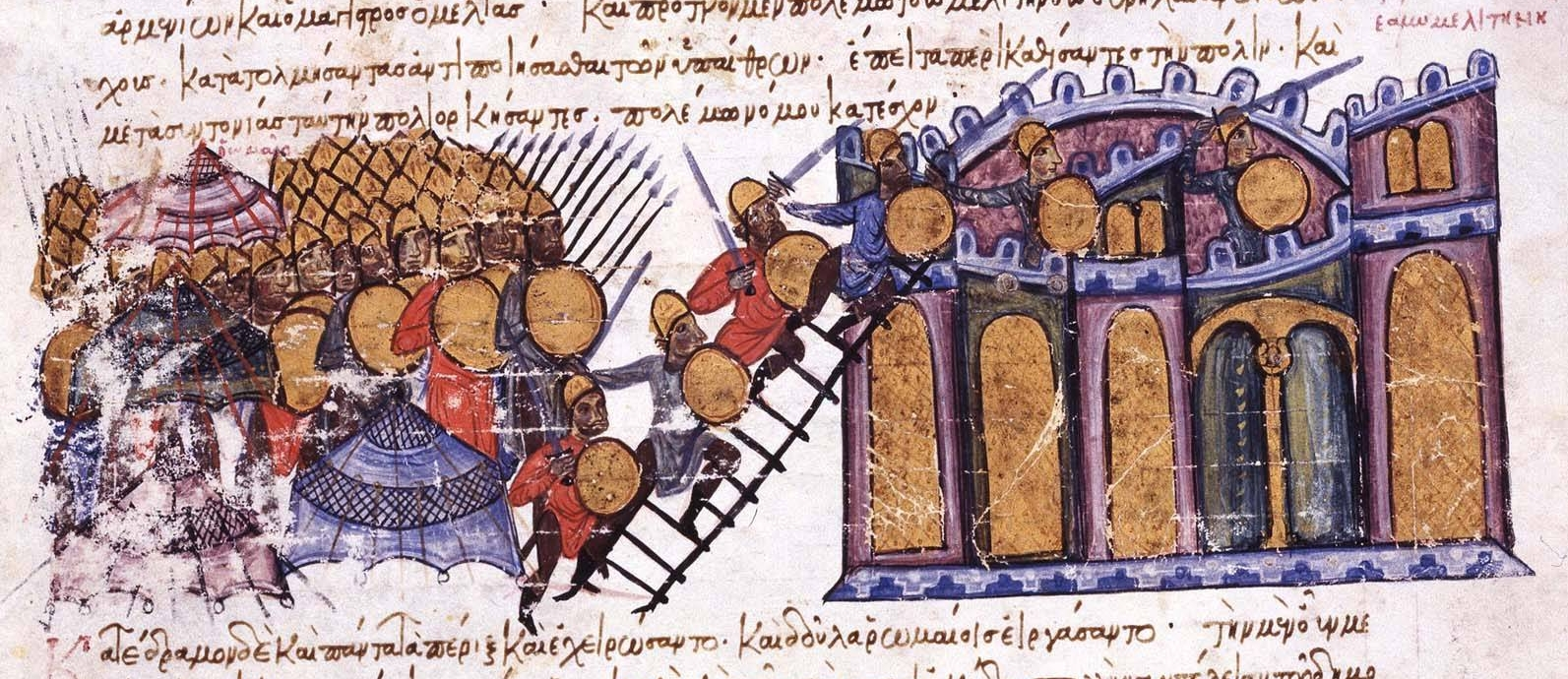
The fall of Melitene to the forces of the Byzantine general John Kourkouas in 934, from the Madrid Skylitzes manuscript.

The most common deployment was a dense formation in depth, in which skoutatoi stood in tightly ordered ranks. The front ranks engaged the enemy directly, while successive ranks supported the formation through depth, allowing it to absorb losses without collapse. Rather than a formal system of replacement, Byzantine tactical principles emphasize that depth itself enabled the formation to sustain pressure over time by maintaining structural cohesion.

This emphasis on stability is consistent with Byzantine military practice during the Arab–Byzantine wars, where infantry formations frequently operated as a fixed defensive core against more mobile adversaries, particularly cavalry-based forces, while preserving the integrity of the battle line.

Within these formations, skoutatoi employed a shield-wall system using the skouton. Shields were overlapped laterally to create a continuous defensive barrier, eliminating gaps between soldiers and improving resistance against arrows and cavalry impact. This method is frequently described in Byzantine tactical literature and was central to the infantry's performance in battles such as those fought during the reign of Nikephoros II Phokas, where disciplined infantry lines supported coordinated cavalry operations in campaigns against the Hamdanids and other eastern frontier powers.

Offensively, the formation relied on the kontarion (spear) deployed in layered ranks. Front ranks presented spears directly forward, while rear ranks extended theirs over or between them, forming a dense spear hedge. This structure created a sustained defensive-offensive barrier particularly effective against cavalry, a threat repeatedly encountered during the Byzantine–Bulgarian wars. Including campaigns associated with Basil II, where infantry discipline played a key role in holding enemy forces in place while Byzantine cavalry executed flanking maneuvers. At the larger tactical level, Skoutatoi were organized into cohesive infantry blocks that formed the central line of the Byzantine battle array. These blocks maintained internal order while aligning with neighboring units, allowing commanders to construct a unified front adaptable to terrain and operational needs. Military authors such as Leo VI and later Nikephoros Ouranos stressed the importance of maintaining these ordered infantry divisions as the stabilizing element in combined-arms warfare.

Although generally rigid in structure, Byzantine tactics allowed for limited variation in deployment, including segmented or staggered arrangements to accommodate missile troops or terrain constraints. These adaptations were especially relevant in frontier warfare, where skoutatoi often had to coordinate with archers and light infantry against highly mobile opponents such as Arab raiders or steppe cavalry forces.

== Legacy ==
The skoutatoi left a lasting imprint on Byzantine military tradition as the archetypal heavy infantry of the middle Byzantine period, embodying the empire's continued reliance on disciplined infantry within a predominantly cavalry-influenced battlefield environment. Although they gradually faded as a distinct formation by the late 11th century, the tactical principles they represented remained deeply embedded in Byzantine military thought. Their most important legacy was the preservation of the idea that organized infantry could serve as the structural foundation of an army, even in an era increasingly dominated by mounted warfare. Byzantine military manuals associated with figures such as Leo VI consistently emphasize the necessity of disciplined infantry formations capable of holding ground and anchoring the battlefield. The Skoutatoi operationalized this doctrine, demonstrating the effectiveness of deep, cohesive infantry blocks supported by coordinated missile and cavalry forces.

The influence of the skoutatoi also extended into the broader evolution of medieval Eastern Roman and Balkan warfare. Their emphasis on shield cohesion, spear-based defensive formations, and unit discipline informed later infantry practices in Byzantine successor states and neighboring military cultures. Even as equipment and organization changed, the underlying principle of infantry functioning as a stable defensive core within combined-arms armies persisted.

In modern historiography, scholars such as Richard A. Gabriel have interpreted the skoutatoi as part of a broader Byzantine synthesis of Roman Military discipline and classical tactical inheritance. In this view, they represent a transitional form of infantry that retained the structural rigor of Roman heavy infantry while adapting to the operational realities of medieval warfare, particularly the persistent threat of mobile cavalry forces.

In the campaigns of Nikephoros II Phokas, especially in the reconquest of Crete and operations in Byzantine Syria, infantry formations were used to secure terrain and fix enemy forces while cavalry and elite Tagma conducted decisive strikes.

In the reign of Basil II, especially during the protracted Byzantine–Bulgarian wars culminating in the victory at Battle of Kleidion, infantry and fortified infantry positions played a key role in fixing enemy forces and enabling operational control, even as cavalry remained decisive in pursuit and exploitation phase.

Under John I Tzimiskes, particularly during campaigns against the Kievan Rus' in the Balkans, Byzantine forces demonstrated mature combined-arms coordination, where infantry held fortified positions and formed the defensive “anchor” of the army, enabling cavalry encirclement tactics.
