= Menaulion =

Byzantine pole weapon

The menaulion or menavlion (Greek: μεναύλιον), also menaulon or menavlon (μέναυλον) was a heavy spear with a length of 2.7 to 3.6 m (8 ft 10 in to 11 ft 10 in) with a thick shaft, used by the Byzantine infantry as early as the 10th century AD, against enemy heavy cavalry. To give it increased strength, whole oak or cornel saplings were preferably used. These were then tipped with a long blade of ca. 45 to 50 cm (18 to 20 in).

Its use is attested by emperor Nikephoros Phokas in his treatise Praecepta Militaria, and by Nikephoros Ouranos and Leo VI the Wise in their Taktika. It is also described in the 10th-century treatise known as the Sylloge Tacticorum. The men who were carrying the menaulia (menaulatoi, sing. menaulatos) were deployed behind the battle line and were only ordered to advance in front before the enemy cavalry charge. They seem to have arrayed in a thin line directly in front of the first rank of the battle line, although the Sylloge Tacticorum has the menaulatoi forming well before it, a tactic strongly condemned by Nikephoros Phokas. Another proposed deployment was obliquely on the flanks of a friendly infantry formation, along with javelineers, in an attempt to directly attack the flanks of the advancing enemy. They also deployed in the intervals between the heavy infantry formations of the Byzantine line along with light infantry to guard against enemy exploitation attempts. Within the encampment, they were positioned at the exits.

In his work De Ceremoniis, Constantine VII Porphyrogenitus orders great numbers of menaulia to be produced.

It has been proposed that the vinavlon mentioned in the 6th century AD by John Malalas in the sixth book of his Chronographia is an archaic form of the same weapon, although in Malalas' text it is carried by cavalrymen.
