= Strategikon of Maurice =

Manual of war written in the late 6th century

The Strategikon or Strategicon (Greek: Στρατηγικόν) is a manual of war regarded as written in late antiquity (6th century) and generally attributed to the Byzantine Emperor Maurice.

== Overview ==
The work is a practical manual and according to its author "a rather modest elementary handbook [...] for those devoting themselves to generalship", that was to serve as a general guide or handbook to Byzantine art of war. In the introduction of his 1984 translation of the text, George Dennis noted that "the Strategikon is written in a very straightforward and generally uncomplicated Greek."

The Strategikon may have been written in an effort to codify the military reforms brought about by the soldier-emperor Maurice. The true authorship of the Strategikon is still debated among academics. Maurice may have only commissioned it and perhaps his brother Peter or, more likely, another general was the true author. The date also remains debated. If it was written during the 6th century, the Strategikon may have been produced to analyze and reflect on the experience of the Balkan and Persian campaigns, or the campaigns may have been carried out in compliance with the manual. However, beginning in the late 19th century, a number of historians have, due to perceived philological and technological inconsistencies, argued for a later publication date during the eighth or ninth century. In any case, the work is considered to be one of the most notable military texts of the medieval Byzantine period, along with treatises attributed to the Byzantine emperors Leo VI (Tactica) and Nicephorus Phocas (De velitatione and the Praecepta Militaria), among others. Leo's Tactica in particular was greatly inspired by the Strategikon.

The text consists of 12 chapters or "books" on various aspects of strategy and tactics, employed by the Byzantine army during the 6th and 7th century A.D. Its contents primarily focus on cavalry tactics and formation and several chapters elaborate on matters of infantry, siege warfare, logistics, education and training and movement. The author was familiar with antique Hellenistic military treatises, especially Onasander and Aelian, which he utilized as conceptional models rather than sources of content. Each book focuses on a generic topic. Several levels of subsections go into further detail and include maps. These maps are mainly sketches and drawings to show essential symbols of troop positions and highlight the standard designs of formation and manoeuvre of the Byzantine military of the epoch. Books seven and eight tackle with practical advice for the commander in the form of instructions and military maxims. The eleventh book is of interest for ethnographers as it portrays various enemies of the Byzantine Empire, such as the Franks, the Lombards, the Avars, the Turks and the Slavs. The Strategikon also represents and refers to military justice and Byzantine legal literature, since it contains a list of military infractions and their respective penalties.

== Contents ==
- Book I – Introduction
- Book II – The Cavalry Battle Formation
- Book III – Formations of the Tagma
- Book IV – Ambushes
- Book V – On Baggage Trains
- Book VI – Various Tactics and Drills
- Book VII – Strategy, The Points Which the General Must Consider
- Book VIII – General Instructions and Maxims
- Book IX – Surprise Attacks
- Book X – Sieges
- Book XI – Characteristics and Tactics of Various Peoples
- Book XII – Mixed Formations, Infantry, Camps and Hunting

== Summary ==
=== Book I – Introduction ===
This book contains a great deal of detail on the origin of the Byzantine Military, and specific information of selections, organization, crimes, and punishment. They go into a great deal of detail on the topics listed below to make sure that there is no confusion on general topics of the Byzantine military. The topics that this book discusses include: training and drilling of soldiers as individuals, the armament of the cavalryman and the basic equipment to be furnished, the various titles of the officers and soldiers, the organization of the army and the assignment of officers, how the tagmatic commanders should select their subordinate officers and combat leaders and organize the Tagma into squads, the regulations about military crimes to be given to the troops, the regulations about military crimes to be given to the tagmatic commanders, military punishments, and the orderly way of marching through an army's own country when there is no hostile activity.

=== Book II – The Cavalry Battle Formation and Book III - Formations of the Tagma ===
These books cover the formations of the cavalry and Tagma. They include maps to show how these formations appeared on a smaller scale, to help people visualize the formations. These maps have many shapes and characters that some will not understand, but through study they can make sense of them because what the characters display on the map. These books cover topics ranging from recruitment, to creation of squads, to the strategy of using block formations of men instead of the one lengthy line. They also discuss the importance of having a cavalry and the importance of the cavalry in their specific military style.

=== Book IV – Ambushes ===
This book discusses what each part of the formations of the cavalry and tagma would do in the case of an ambush. It also covers formations to deter the ambush from taking place. It provides certain spacings between squads, to prevent an ambush from reaching a squad without the intervention of a squad further behind. This method was also used to help prevent retreats by any soldier, because there would always be someone watching them.

=== Book V – On Baggage Trains ===
Baggage trains should be regarded with utmost care as they contain the ingredients to make a forward operating base function, including servants and children. Baggage trains should be kept away from areas of battle to avoid dispiriting soldier morale in the event of capture. Reserve horses should be kept with the baggage train at the onset of battle, their utility is not needed at the front line and will only add to the confusion in battle. The encampment area for the baggage train should be stationed in a defensible area with water and grass readily available at a distance of approximately 30 to 50 miles away from the location of the main battle and should be staffed with a force of two Banda; the encampment should forage for food and have equivalent to four days of necessity. The defense force should select known and capable men to form a communication chain from the baggage train encampment to the front line. An intermediate encampment, closer to the front line, should be established between the battle area and the baggage train; the camp should be fortified and supplied with food for a day at the camp for each bandon. While in transit, the baggage train should be kept separate from the soldiers' marching lines; when enemies are present, the baggage train should be in the middle of the caravan to avoid harassment by enemies.

=== Book VI – Various Tactics and Drills, Book VII - Strategy. The Points Which the General Must Consider, and Book VIII - General Instructions and Maxims ===
Book VI contains the tactics and drills that the military had at the time to properly train the individual soldier. This gave them all of the knowledge that they would need in battle with weapons, tactics, actions, and strategies. Book VII focuses on the different strategic points that generals must consider prior to engaging in a battle, not necessarily a war. Book VIII then covers the details of the instructions that the generals would be given by Emperor Maurice and his administrative people.

=== Book IX – Surprise Attacks and Book X - Sieges ===
These books cover the surprise attacks and siege strategies that the Byzantine military used at this point in time. They cover different strategies the military would use for a surprise attack on an enemy, or to seize enemy land without a battle.

=== Book XI – Characteristics and Tactics of Various Peoples and Book XII - Mixed Formations, Infantry, Camps and Hunting ===
Books XI and XII cover the mixed uses of non-cavalry and tagma groups and their various formations. They explain what the rest of the army was to do while the Tagmas and cavalry were in formation and use.

In a separate chapter of Book XI, the author presents everything useful, needed and important from a military point of view about the life of specific enemies.

- He describes Persians as deviant but obedient and "persistent in work and fighting in the name of their homeland".
- Scythians, Turks and Avarians and similar are nomad people; sinewy, superstitious, reckless, committed to a desire for abundance. They are good at horse riding and archery. Also, they own a lot of horses. They can stay on horseback for a very long time, but they are not skilful while they are walking, nor very hardy.
- Francs, Lombards and their lookalikes value their freedom very much. They are fearless and bold in battle. They are dissolute in attack and disobedient to their leaders. They are greedy and bribable. They can't stand the heat as much as cold, they are easily ambushed, their camps are very unorganized.
- Slavs, Antes and their lookalikes have the same customs and will not enslave their own; Slavs act with slaves better than other nations and after certain period of time a slave will be released and he can go back home or stay and live as an equal member of the Slavic community. They easily bear extreme weather conditions and a shortage of food; they are good at crossing water, as well as hiding under the water (by using concave canes). They are friendly with foreigners and their hospitality is well known - revenge for the guest is considered a duty. They are easily bribed, they are discordant, and they cannot stand each other. Slavs are skilled with arms and nimble in tight and wooded areas, but unorganized in more open battles. The author praises Slavic women who are honorable after their husbands died".

== Conclusions ==
Military historians consider the Strategikon to be the earliest sophisticated theory of combined arms at battalion level (Greek: Tagma). However, historians still question and debate the validity of these sources due to the tradition of copying from ancient Greek and Roman authors, such as Aeneas Tacticus, Arrian or Polybius in Byzantine treatises like the Strategikon, the Tactica, the Sylloge Taktikon, the Praecepta Militaria and others. The Strategikon also testifies to the lasting influence of Latin on the Byzantine terminology of warfare and shows that up until the year 600 C.E Latin was still the official command language of the imperial army.

== See also ==
- Byzantine military manuals
