= Byzantine army =

Land branch of the armed forces of the Byzantine Empire

- Imperial flag (basilikon phlamoulon) of the Palaiologan era (14th century)
- Leader: Byzantine Emperor (commander-in-chief)
- Dates active: c. 395–1453
- Headquarters: Constantinople
- Active regions: Balkans, Asia Minor, Levant, Mesopotamia, Italy, Armenia, North Africa, Spania, Caucasus, Crimea
- Part of: Byzantine Empire
- Wars: the wars of the Byzantine Empire

The Byzantine army was the primary military body of the Byzantine armed forces, serving alongside the Byzantine navy. A direct continuation of the Eastern Roman army, shaping and developing itself on the legacy of the late Hellenistic armies, it maintained a similar level of discipline, strategic prowess and organization. It was among the most effective armies of western Eurasia for much of the Middle Ages. Over time the cavalry arm became more prominent in the Byzantine army as the legion system disappeared in the early 7th century. Later reforms reflected some Germanic and Asian influences—rival forces frequently became sources of mercenary units, such as the Huns, Cumans, Alans and (following the Battle of Manzikert) Turks, meeting the Empire's demand for light cavalry mercenaries. Since much of the Byzantine military focused on the strategy and skill of generals utilizing militia troops, heavy infantry were recruited from Frankish and later Varangian mercenaries.

From the 6th to the 12th centuries, the Byzantine army was among the most powerful and effective military forces in the world – neither Middle Ages Europe nor (following its early successes) the fracturing Caliphate could match the strategies and the efficiency of the Byzantine army. Restricted to a largely defensive role in the 7th to mid-9th centuries, the Byzantines developed the theme system to counter the more powerful Caliphate. From the mid-9th century, however, they gradually went on the offensive, culminating in the great conquests of the 10th century under a series of soldier-emperors such as Nikephoros II Phokas, John Tzimiskes and Basil II. The army they led was less reliant on the militia of the themes; it was by now a largely professional force, with a strong and well-drilled infantry at its core and augmented by a revived heavy cavalry arm. With one of the most powerful economies in the world at the time, the Empire had the resources to put to the field a powerful host when needed, in order to reclaim its long-lost territories.

After the collapse of the theme system in the 11th century, the Byzantines grew increasingly reliant on professional Tagmata troops, including ever-increasing numbers of foreign mercenaries. The Komnenian emperors made great efforts to re-establish a native army, instituting the pronoia system of land grants in exchange for military service. Nevertheless, mercenaries remained a staple feature of late Byzantine armies since the loss of Asia Minor reduced the Empire's recruiting-ground, while the abuse of the pronoia grants led to a progressive feudalism in the Empire. The Komnenian successes were undone by the subsequent Angeloi dynasty, leading to the dissolution of the Empire at the hands of the Fourth Crusade in 1204.

The Emperors of Nicaea managed to form a small but effective force using the same structure of light and heavily armed troops, both natives and foreigners. It proved effective in defending what remained of Byzantine Anatolia and reclaiming much of the Balkans and even Constantinople itself in 1261. Another period of neglect of the military followed in the reign of Andronikos II Palaiologos, which allowed Anatolia to fall prey to an emerging power, the Ottoman Empire. Successive civil wars in the 14th century further sapped the Empire's strength and destroyed any remaining chance of recovery, while the weakening of central authority and the devolution of power to provincial leaders meant that the Byzantine army was now composed of a collection of militias, personal entourages and mercenary detachments.

== History ==
In the period after the Muslim conquests, which saw the loss of Syria and Egypt, the remnants of the provincial armies were withdrawn and settled in Asia Minor, initiating the thematic system. Despite this unprecedented disaster, the internal structures of the army remained much the same, and there is a remarkable continuity in tactics and doctrine between the 6th and 11th centuries. The Battle of Manzikert in 1071 and the subsequent Seljuk invasions, together with the arrival of the Crusades and the incursions of the Normans, would severely weaken the Byzantine state and its military, which increasingly had to rely on foreign mercenaries.

=== The army under Diocletian and Constantine ===
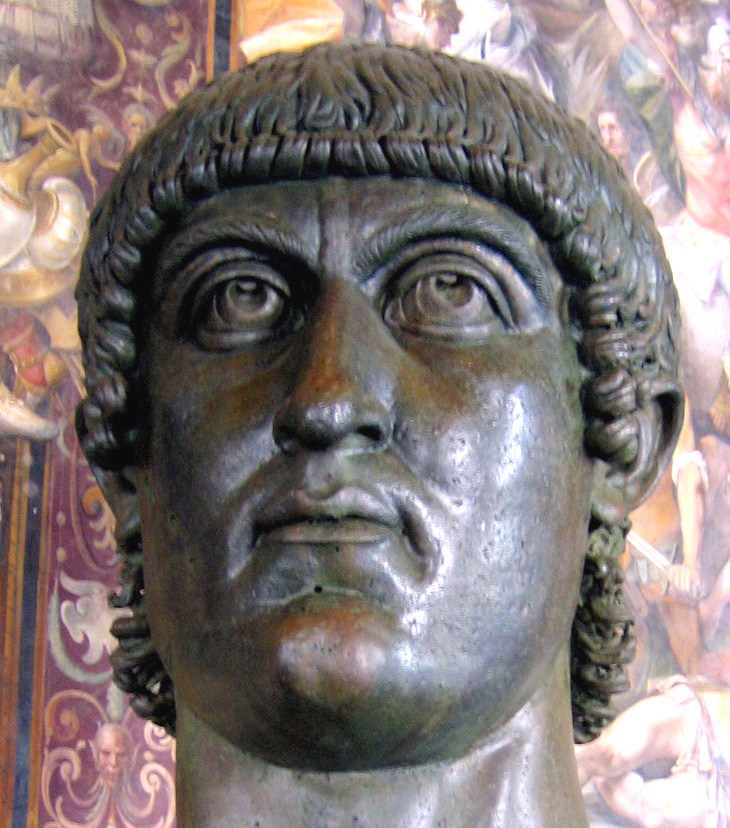
Emperor Constantine I

The Eastern Empire dates from the creation of the Tetrarchy ("Quadrumvirate") by the Emperor Diocletian in 293. His plans for succession did not outlive his lifetime, but his reorganization of the army did by centuries. Rather than maintain the traditional infantry-heavy legions, Diocletian reformed it into limitanei ("border") and comitatenses (field armies). However, the last legion, Legio V Macedonica, survived until 637, when it was destroyed during the Arab invasion of Egypt.

There was an expansion of the importance of the cavalry, though the infantry still remained the major component of the Roman armies, in contrast to common belief. In preparation for Justinian's African campaign of 533–534 AD, the army assembled amounted to 10,000-foot soldiers and 5,000 mounted archers and federate lancers.

The limitanei and ripenses were to occupy the limes, the Roman border fortifications. The field units, by contrast, were to stay well behind the border and move quickly where they were needed, whether for offensive or defensive roles, as well as forming an army against usurpers. The field units were held to high standards and took precedence over Limitanei in pay and provisions.

Cavalry formed about one-third of the units, but as a result of smaller units, about one-quarter of the Roman armies consisted of cavalry. About half the cavalry consisted of heavy cavalry (including the stablesiani). They were armed with spear or lance and sword and armored in mail. Some had bows, but they were meant for supporting the charge instead of independent skirmishing.

In the field armies there was a component of some 15% of cataphractarii or clibanarii, heavily armoured cavalry who used shock tactics. The light cavalry (including the scutarii and promoti) featured high amongst the limitanei, being very useful troops on patrol. They included horse archers (Equites Sagittarii). The infantry of the comitatenses was organized in regiments (variously named legiones, auxilia or just numeri) of about 500–1,200 men. They were still the heavy infantry of old, with a spear or sword, shield, body armour and a helmet. But now each regiment was supported by a detachment of light infantry skirmishers.

If needed, the infantry could take off (some of) their armour to act in a more flexible way as Modares did (according to Zosimus) during the Gothic War of the 370s. The regiments were commanded by a tribunus ("tribune") and brigaded in pairs (cavalry units did, too) under a comes. These brigades probably were tactical and strategic units only, as no traces survive of brigade staff corps.

On the other hand, little is known of the limitanei. The old legions, cohorts and cavalry alae survived there, and newer units were created (the new legions, or auxilia and vexillationes), amongst the cavalry. The limitanei infantry may have been lighter-equipped than the comitatenses infantry, but there is no evidence whatsoever. They were paid less than the field troops and recruited locally. Consequently, they were of inferior quality. However, they were in the line of fire. They countered most incursions and raids. Thus, it can be assumed they had superior field experience (except in periods of long campaigning for the comitatenses), though that experience did not extend to large battles and sieges.

The Scholae Palatinae units, which were more properly known as the Schola Protectores Domestici and the "Protective Association of the Royal Escort" (also called the Obsequium), were the personal guard of the Emperor, and were created to replace the Praetorian Guard disbanded by Constantine I.

Following a major reorganisation of the Roman army during the Emperor Diocletian's reign (284–305 AD) the legions in the third and fourth century bore little resemblance to those of the Republic or earlier Roman empire. Reduced in numbers to about 1,000 men per legion, these units became static garrison troops, sometimes serving on a part-time militia basis as hereditary limitanei. As such they were separate from the new mobile field army.

=== The army of Justinian I and his successors ===
The army of Justinian I was the result of fifth-century reorganizations to meet growing threats to the empire, the most serious from the expanding Persian empire. Gone were the familiar legions, cohorts and alae of old Rome, and in their place were small Greek infantry battalions or horse regiments called an arithmos, tagma or numerus. A numerus had between 300 and 400 men and was commanded by a Stratarches. Two or more numeri formed a brigade, or moira; two or more brigades a division, or meros.

There were six classifications of troops:

1. The guard troops stationed in the capital.
2. The comitatenses of the old Roman field armies. In Justinian's day these were more commonly called stratiotai. Regular soldiers of the early Byzantine army, the stratiotai were chiefly recruited from subjects of the empire in the highlands of Thrace, Illyricum and Isauria.
3. The limitanei. The least changed element of the Roman army, limitanei still performed their traditional duties of guarding frontiers and garrisoning border posts. Like how the comitatenses were called stratiotai in the heyday of the Justinians, the limitanei were known as akritai by the mainly Greek-speaking subjects of the Eastern Empire. This terming of limitanei as akritai in Greek, led to folktales of the heroism of the limitanei/akritai, especially the popular tale of the hero Digenes Akritas during the wars between the Byzantines and the various Arab Caliphates.
4. The foederati. They were a relatively new element in the army, recruited from the fifth century onwards from barbarian volunteers. They were formed into cavalry units under Byzantine "Gothic" officers. A ban on enlistments by Byzantine subjects was lifted in the sixth century, and their composition became mixed.
5. The Allies. These were bands of barbarians, Huns, Herules, Goths or others who were bound by treaty to provide the empire with military units commanded by their own chiefs, in return for land or yearly subsidy.
6. The bucellarii. The private armed retainers of generals, Praetorian Prefects, officers of lesser rank and the rich, the bucellarii were often a significant portion of a field army's cavalry force. The size of a retinue of bucellarii depended on the wealth of the employer. Their rank and file were called hypaspistai, or shield-bearers, and their officers, doryphoroi or spear-bearers. Doryphoroi took solemn oaths of fidelity to their patron and of loyalty to the emperor. One of the most noted generals of the period, Belisarius, had been a doryphoros in Justinian's retinue before his becoming emperor. The bucellarii were usually mounted troops, mostly Huns, Goths and mountaineers of Thrace or Asia Minor.

The size of Justinian's army is unclear. Bury, writing in the 1920s, accepted the estimate of 150,000 troops of all classes in 559 given by Agathia of Myrina in his History. Norwich also estimated the army under Justinian at 150,000 soldiers. Other scholars estimate the total strength of the imperial army under Justinian to be between 300,000 and 350,000 soldiers. Field armies generally had 15,000 to 25,000 soldiers and were formed mainly of comitatenses and foederati, reinforced by the commanders' retinues and barbarian allies. The expeditionary force of Belisarius during his reconquest of Carthage from the Vandals in 533 is illustrative.

This army had 10,000 comitatenses and foederati infantry, with 3,000 similarly composed cavalry. There were 600 Huns and 400 Herules, all mounted archers, and 1,400 or 1,500 mounted bucellarii of Belisarius' retinue. The small force of less than 16,000 men voyaged from the Bospherus to North Africa on 500 ships protected by 92 dromons, or war-ships.

Tactics, organization and equipment had been largely modified to deal with the Persians. The Byzantines adopted elaborate defensive armor from Persia, coats of mail, cuirasses, casques and greaves of steel for tagma of elite heavy cavalrymen called cataphracts, who were armed with bow and arrows as well as sword and lance.

Large numbers of light infantry were equipped with the bow, to support the heavy infantry known as scutatii (Meaning ″shield men″) or skutatoi. These wore a steel helmet and a coat of mail, and carried a spear, axe and dagger. They generally held the centre of a Greek line of battle. Infantry armed with javelins were used for operations in mountain regions.

Notable military events during the reign of Justinian included the battle of Dara in 530, when Belisarius, with a force of 25,000, defeated the Persian emperor's army of 40,000. In addition to his reconquest of Carthage, noted above, Belisarius also recaptured Sicily, Naples, Rome and the rest of Italy from the Goths in a war lasting from 535 to 554. Another famous commander of the time was the imperial eunuch Narses, who defeated a Gothic army at Busta Gallorum on the eastern coast of Italy in 552.

Towards the end of the sixth century, the Emperor Maurice, or senior officers writing for him, described in great detail the Byzantine army of the period in The Strategikon, a manual for commanders. Maurice, who reigned from 582 to 602, certainly had extensive military experience. In 592, he forced the Persians to sign a treaty that regained extensive Armenian territory for the empire that had been lost in earlier wars. Maurice then turned to the western frontier in the Balkans. In a war that lasted the rest of his life, he defeated the Avars and Slavs in battle, but could not gain a decisive victory.

The Strategikon's author gives us a fair picture of the Byzantine army and its troops, including the equipment borrowed from the Herules, Goths, Slavs and especially the Avars, once barbarian enemies all. Cavalrymen should have "hooded coats of mail reaching to their ankles which may be drawn up by thongs and rings, along with carying cases." Helmets were to have small plumes on top and bows were to be suited to the strength of each man, their cases broad enough that strung bows can fit in them, and spare bow strings kept the men's saddle bags. The men's quivers should have covers and hold 30 or 40 arrows and they should carry small files and awls in their baldrics. The cavalry lances should be "of the Avar type with leather thongs in the middle of the shaft and with pennons." The men were also to have "swords and round neck pieces of the Avar type with linen fringes outside and wool inside." Young foreigners unskilled with the bow should have lances and shields and bucellary troops ought to have iron gauntlets and small tassles hanging from the back straps and neck straps of their horses, as well as small pennons hanging from their own shoulders over their coats of mail, "for the more handsome the soldier is, in his armament, the more confidence he gains in himself and the more fear he inspires in the enemy." Lances were apparently expected to be thrown, for the troops should have "two lances so as to have a spare in case the first one misses. Unskilled men should use lighter bows."

The manual then describes horse gear and the trooper's clothing. "The horses, especially those of the officers and the other special troops, in particular those in the front ranks of the battle line, should have protective pieces of iron armor about their heads and breast plates of iron or felt, or else breast and neck coverings such as the Avars use. The saddles should have large and thick cloths; the bridles should be of good quality; attached to the saddles should be two iron stirrups, a lasso with thong, hobble, a sadle bag large enough to hold three or four days' rations when needed. There should be four tassels on the back strap, one on top of the head, and one under the chin."

"The men's clothing," the Strategikon continues, "especially their tunics, whether made of linen, goat's hair or rough wool, should be broad and full, cut according to the Avar pattern, so they can be fastened to cover the knees while riding and give a neat appearance. They should also be provided with an extra-large cloak or hooded mantle of felt with broad sleeves to wear, large enough to wear over their armament, including the coat of mail and the bow." "Each squad should have a tent, as well as sickles and axes to meet any contingency. It is well to have tents of the Avar type, which combine practicality with good appearance."

"The men," according to The Strategikon, "should certainly be required to provide servants for themselves, slave or free ... Should they neglect this and find themselves without servants, then in time of battle it will be necessary to detail some of the soldiers themselves to the baggage train, and there will be fewer men fighting in the ranks. But if, as can easily happen, some of the men are unable to afford servants, then it will be necessary to require that three or four soldiers join in maintaining one servant. A similar arrangement should be made with the pack animals, which may be needed to carry the coats of mail and the tents."

The manual then describes a system of unit identification that sounds like a fore-runner of medieval heraldry. The flags of a meros or division, should be the same color. The streamers of its immediate sub-units, the several moiras or brigades, should also have their own color. Thus, the manual states, "each individual tagma, (battalion or squadron) may easily recognize its own standard. Other distinctive devices known to the soldiers should be imposed on the fields of the flags, so that they may easily be recognized according to meros, moira and tagma. The standards of the merarchs (meros commander) should be particularly distinctive and conspicuous, so they may be recognized by their troops at a great distance."

The Strategikon deals more briefly with the infantry. They are to wear Gothic tunics "coming down to their knees or short ones split up the sides and Gothic shoes with thick soles, broad toes and plain stitching, fastened with no more than two clasps the soles studded with a few nails for greater durability." Boots or greaves are discouraged, "for they are unsuitable for marching and, if worn, slow one down. Their mantles should be simple, not like Bulgarian cloaks. Their hair should be cut short, and it is better if it is not allowed to grow long."

The descriptions of the armament of the "heavy-armed infantrymen" are equally terse. "The men of each arithmos or tagma," the Strategikon tells us, "should have shields of the same color, Herulian swords, lances, helmets with small plumes and tassels on top and on the cheek plates – at least the first men in the file should have these – slings, and lead-pointed darts. The picked men of the files should have mail coats, all of them if it can be done, but in any case the first two in the file. They should also have iron or wooden greaves, at least the first and second in each file."

The light-armed infantryman, still quoting the Strategikon, "should carry bows on their shoulders with large quivers holding about 30 or 40 arrows. They should have small shields, as well as crossbows with short arrows in small quivers. These can be fired a great distance with the bows and cause harm to the enemy. For men who might not have bows or are not experienced archers, small javelins or Slavic spears should be provided. They should also carry lead-pointed darts in leather cases, and slings."

The strength of the Byzantine army and navy in 565 is estimated by Treadgold to have been 379,300 men, with a field army and part of the guards totaling 150,300, and the frontier troops, part of the guards and the oarsmen totaling 229,000. These numbers probably held through the reign of Maurice. However, the largest field army mentioned in the Strategikon is a force of 34,384 (16,384 heavy infantry, 8,000 light-armed troops and 10,000 cavalry) which is given as an example of "the past, when the legions were composed of large numbers of men." Writing of his own time, Maurice stipulates that an army of more than 24,000 men should be divided into four components and an army of less than 24,000 into three. In another section, Maurice describes the formation of cavalry tagmas of 300 to 400 men into morias of 2,000 to 3,000 and the morias into meros of 6,000 to 7,000.

=== Middle Byzantine period, 7th–11th centuries ===
==== The Themata ====
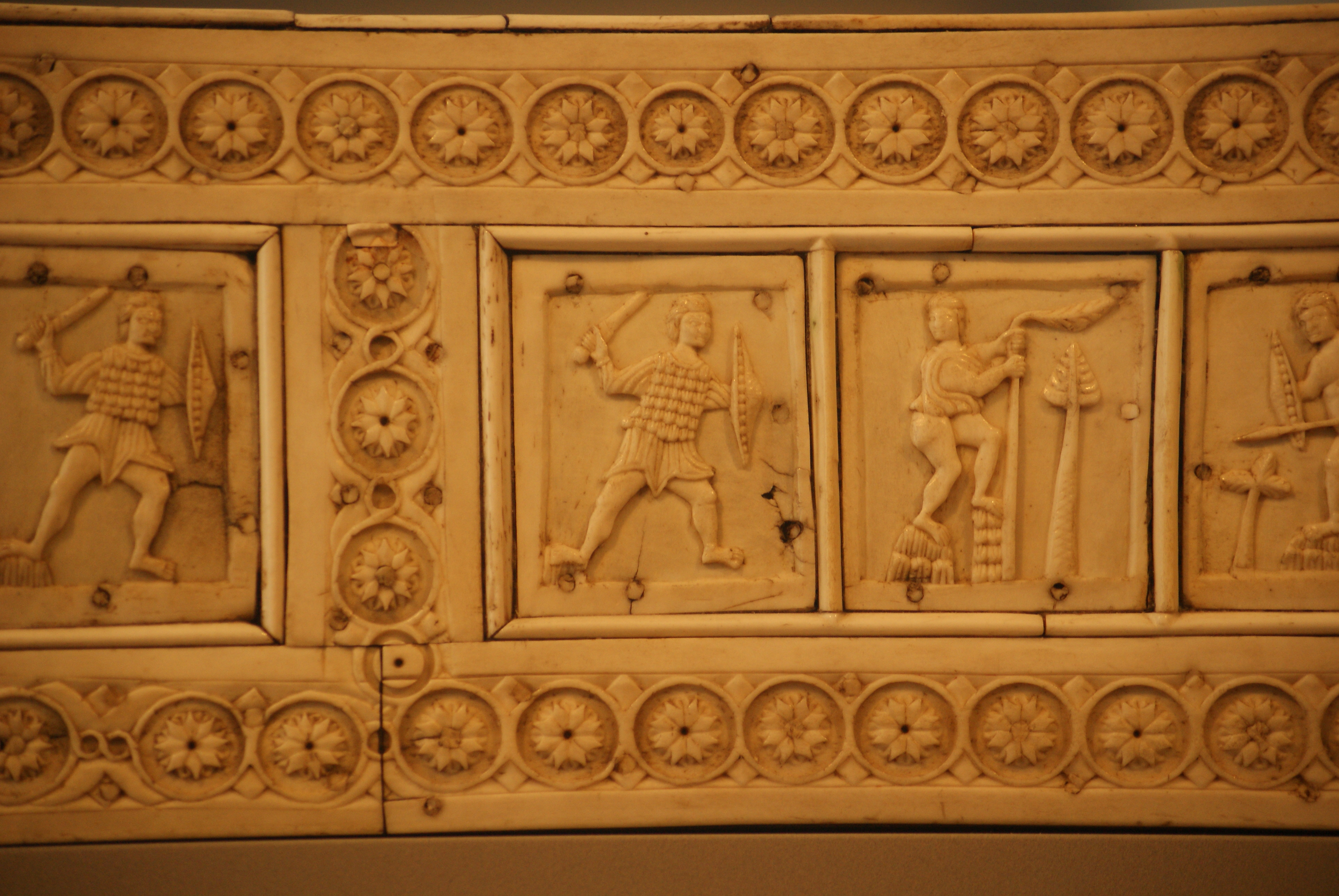
A 10th–12th century ivory relief of Byzantine swordsmen – Berlin Bode museum.

The themata (Gr. θέματα) were administrative divisions of the empire in which a general (Gr. στρατηγός, strategos) exercised both civilian and military jurisdiction and a Judge (Κριτής του Θέματος, Krites tou thematos) held the judicial power. The name is peculiar; Treadgold's closest guess is that thema was being used to denote "emplacements". Modern historians agree that the designations of the first themes came from the field armies that were stationed in Asia Minor.

The themata were organized as a response to the enormous military and territorial losses suffered during the conquests of the Muslim Rashidun Caliphate – Syria in 637, Armenia and Egypt in 639, North Africa in 652 and Cyprus in 654. Treadgold cites estimates that indicate the empire's population dropped from 19.5 million in 560 to 10.5 million in 641. At the same time the size of armed forces plunged from 379,300 men to 129,000.

By 662, the empire had lost more than half its territory in 30 years, and the first mentions occur in surviving records of themata under the command of generals, or strategi, that are the remnants of the former mobile armies now stationed in set districts. At some later time, when payment in cash had become difficult, the soldiers were given land grants within their districts for their support.

The dates of this process are uncertain, but Treadgold points to 659–662 as the most likely time-frame, as this is the period when the Emperor Constans II made a truce with the Arabs that gave the army time to regroup, the government ran out of money to pay the troops, and the empire's enormous losses of territory stopped. The themata provided a bulwark against Arab invasions and raids that lasted until the late 11th century. Themata were also formed in the west, as a response to the Serb and Bulgar incursions that drove the empire's frontier from the Danube River south to Thrace and the Peloponnese.

The five original themata were all in Asia Minor and originated from the earlier mobile field armies. They were:

- the Armeniac Theme (Θέμα Άρμενιάκων, Thema Armeniakōn), first mentioned in 667, was the successor of the Army of Armenia. It occupied the old areas of the Pontus, Armenia Minor and northern Cappadocia, with its capital at Amasea
- the Anatolic Theme (Θέμα Άνατολικῶν, Thema Anatolikōn), first mentioned in 669, was the successor of the Army of the East (Άνατολῆ). It covered central Asia Minor, and its capital was Amorium.
- the Opsician Theme (Θέμα Ὀψικίου, Thema Opsikiou), first mentioned in 680, was where the imperial retinue (in Latin Obsequium), was established. It covered northwestern Asia Minor (Bithynia, Paphlagonia and parts of Galatia), and was based at Nicaea. Its commander bore the title of komēs ("count")
- the Thracesian Theme (Θέμα Θρακησίων, Thema Thrakēsiōn), first mentioned in 680, was the successor of the Army of Thrace. It covered the central western coast of Asia Minor (Ionia, Lydia and Caria), with capital at Ephesos.
- the corps of the Carabisiani (Kαραβησιάνοι, Karabēsianoi), first mentioned in 680, probably formed from the remnants of the Army of the Illyricum or the old quaestura exercitus. It occupied the southern coast of Asia Minor and the Aegean Islands, with its capital at Attaleia. It was a naval corps (κάραβις means "ship"), and its commander bore the title of droungarios. It was replaced with the Cibyrrhaeot Theme in the early 8th century.

Within each theme, eligible men were given grants of land to support their families and to equip themselves. Following revolts strengthened by the large size of these divisions, Leo III the Isaurian, Theophilus, and Leo VI the Wise all responded by breaking the themes up into smaller areas and dividing control over the armies within each theme into various tourmai. The large early themes were progressively split up in the 8th–9th centuries to reduce their governors' power, while in the 10th century, new and much smaller themes, called "Armenian themes" because many were settled by Armenians, were created in the East in conquered territories. While in ca. 842 the Taktikon Uspensky lists 18 strategoi of themes, the De Thematibus of ca. 940 lists 28, and the Escorial Taktikon, written ca. 971–975, lists almost 90 strategoi of themes and other military commands.

Sicily had been completely lost to the expanding Emirate of Sicily at the beginning of Constantine VII's reign in 905 and Cyprus was a condominium jointly administered with the Abbasid Caliphate until its reconquest by Nikephoros II Phokas in 965. Constantinople itself was under an Eparch and protected by the numerous tagmata and police forces.

The empire is estimated by Treadgold to have had a population of 7 million in 774, with an army and navy that totaled 118,400. This included 62,000 thematic troops in 10 themes (including 4,000 marines in the naval themes of Hellas and Cibyrrhaeot), 18,000 in six tagmas, and 38,400 oarsmen divided between the Imperial fleet and the naval themes. By 840, the population had grown by a million, while the army had expanded to a total strength of 154,600. There were 96,000 soldiers and marines in 20 themes and 24,000 in the tagmas, while the number of Imperial and thematic oarsmen declined to 34,200.

Under the direction of the thematic strategoi, tourmarchai commanded from two up to four divisions of soldiers and territory, called tourmai. Under them, the droungarioi headed subdivisions called droungoi, each with a thousand soldiers. In the field, these units would be further divided into banda with a nominal strength of 300 men, although at times reduced to little more than 50. Again, the fear of empowering effective revolts was largely behind these subdivisions.

The following table illustrates the thematic structure as found in the Thracesian Theme, circa 902–936.

Name	No. of personnel	No. of subordinate units	Officer in command
Thema	9 600	4 Tourmai	Strategos
Tourma	2 400	6 Droungoi	Tourmarches
Droungos	400	2 Banda	Droungarios
Bandon	200	2 Kentarchiai	Komes
Kentarchia	100	10 Kontoubernia	Kentarches/Hekatontarches
	50	5 Kontoubernia	Pentekontarches
Kontoubernion	10	1 "Vanguard" + 1 "Rear Guard"	Dekarchos
"Vanguard"	5	n/a	Pentarches
"Rear Guard"	4	n/a	Tetrarches

==== The Imperial tagmata ====
The tagmata (τάγματα, "regiments") were the professional standing army of the Empire, formed by Emperor Constantine V after the suppression of a major revolt in the Opsician Theme in 741–743. Anxious to safeguard his throne from the frequent revolts of the thematic armies, Constantine reformed the old guard units of Constantinople into the new tagmata regiments, which were meant to provide the emperor with a core of professional and loyal troops. They were typically headquartered in or around Constantinople, although during the 10th century they sent detachments to the provinces. The tagmata were a mixture of heavy cavalry and heavy infantry units and formed the core of the imperial army on campaign, augmented by the provincial levies of thematic troops who were more concerned with local defense.

The four main tagmata were:

- the Scholai (Gr. Σχολαί, "the Schools"), the most senior unit, the direct successor of the imperial guards established by Constantine the Great.
- the Exkoubitoi or Exkoubitores (Lat. Excubiti, Gr. Ἐξκούβιτοι, "the Sentinels"), established by Leo I.
- the Arithmos (Gr. Ἀριθμός, "Number") or Vigla (Gr. Βίγλα, from the Latin word for "Watch"), promoted from thematic troops by the Empress Eirene in the 780s, but of far older ancestry, as the archaic names of its ranks indicate. By the reign of Nicephorus I (802–11) the Vigla had become a permanent part of the tagmata with responsibility for guarding the Sacred Palace and the Hippodrome in Constantinople. The regiment performed special duties on campaign, including guarding the imperial camp, relaying the Emperor's orders, and guarding prisoners of war.
- the Hikanatoi (Gr. Ἱκανάτοι, "the Able Ones"), established by Emperor Nicephorus I in 810.

There were also auxiliary tagmata, such as the Noumeroi (Gr. Νούμεροι), a garrison unit for Constantinople, which probably included the regiment "of the Walls" (Gr. τῶν Τειχέων, tōn Teicheōn), manning the Walls of Constantinople, and the Optimatoi (Gr. Ὀπτιμάτοι, "the Best"), a support unit responsible for the mules of the army's baggage train (the τοῦλδον, touldon).

Treadgold estimates that between 773 and 899, the strength of the Schools, Excubitors, Watch and Hicanati was 16,000 cavalrymen, that of the Numera and Walls 4,000 infantry. The Optimates had 2,000 support troops until sometime after 840, when their strength was raised to 4,000. In circa 870, the Imperial Fleet Marines were founded, adding another 4,000, for a total active force of 28,000.

There was also the Hetaireia (Gr. Ἑταιρεία, "Companions"), which comprised the various mercenary corps in Imperial service, subdivided in Greater, Middle and Lesser, each commanded by a Hetaireiarchēs recalling the royal Macedonian company of old.

In addition to these more or less stable units, any number of shorter-lived tagmata were formed as favoured units of various emperors. Michael II raised the Tessarakontarioi, a special marine unit, and John I Tzimiskes created a corps called the Athanatoi (Gr. Ἀθάνατοι, the "Immortals") after the old Persian unit.

=== The army during the Komnenian dynasty ===
==== Establishment and successes ====
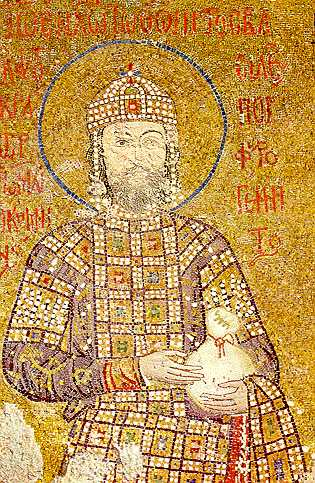
Emperor John II Komnenos became renowned for his superb generalship and conducted many successful sieges. Under his leadership, the Byzantine army reconquered substantial territories from the Turks.

At the beginning of the Komnenian period in 1081, the Byzantine Empire had been reduced to the smallest territorial extent in its history. Surrounded by enemies, and financially ruined by a long period of civil war, the empire's prospects had looked grim. Yet, through a combination of skill, determination and years of campaigning, Alexios I Komnenos, John II Komnenos and Manuel I Komnenos managed to restore the power of the Byzantine Empire by constructing a new army from the ground up.

The new force is known as the Komnenian army. It was both professional and disciplined. It contained formidable guards units such as the Varangian Guard and the Immortals (a unit of heavy cavalry) stationed in Constantinople, and also levies from the provinces. These levies included cataphract cavalry from Macedonia, Thessaly and Thrace, and various other provincial forces from regions such as the Black Sea coast of Asia Minor.

Under John II, a Macedonian division was maintained, and new native Byzantine troops were recruited from the provinces. As Byzantine Asia Minor began to prosper under John and Manuel, more soldiers were raised from the Asiatic provinces of Neokastra, Paphlagonia and even Seleucia (in the south east). Soldiers were also drawn from defeated peoples, such as the Pechenegs (cavalry archers), and the Serbs, who were used as settlers stationed at Nicomedia.

Native troops were organised into regular units and stationed in both the Asian and European provinces. Komnenian armies were also often reinforced by allied contingents from the Principality of Antioch, Serbia and Hungary, yet even so they generally consisted of about two-thirds Byzantine troops to one-third foreigners. Units of archers, infantry and cavalry were grouped together so as to provide combined arms support to each other.

This Komnenian army was a highly effective, well-trained and well-equipped force, capable of campaigning in Egypt, Hungary, Italy and Palestine. However, like many aspects of the Byzantine state under the Komnenoi, its biggest weakness was that it relied on a powerful and competent ruler to direct and maintain its operations. While Alexios, John and Manuel ruled (c. 1081–c. 1180), the Komnenian army provided the empire with a period of security that enabled Byzantine civilization to flourish. Yet, at the end of the twelfth century the competent leadership upon which the effectiveness of the Komnenian army depended largely disappeared. The consequences of this breakdown in command were to prove disastrous for the Byzantine Empire.

==== Neglect under the Angeloi ====
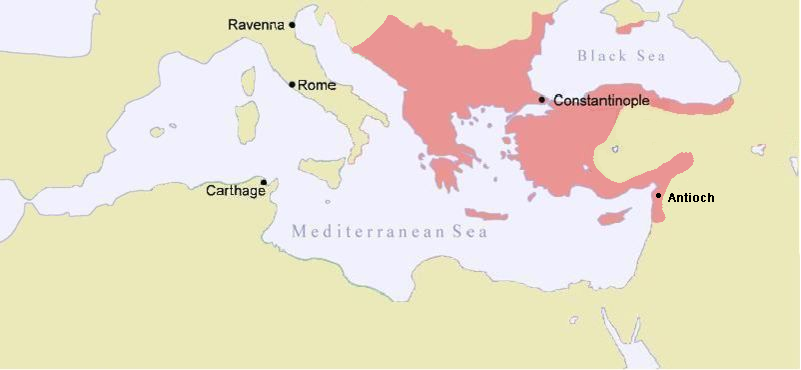
A map of the Byzantine Empire under Manuel Komnenos, c. 1180.

In the year 1185, the emperor Andronikos I Komnenos was killed. With him died the Komnenos dynasty, which had provided a series of militarily competent emperors for over a century. They were replaced by the Angeloi, who have the reputation of being the most unsuccessful dynasty ever to occupy the Byzantine throne.

The army of the Byzantine empire at this point was highly centralised. It was dominated by a system in which the emperor gathered together his forces and personally led them against hostile armies and strongholds. Generals were closely controlled, and all arms of the state looked to Constantinople for instruction and reward.

However, the inaction and ineptitude of the Angeloi quickly lead to a collapse in Byzantine military power, both at sea and on land. Surrounded by a crowd of slaves, mistresses and flatterers, they permitted the empire to be administered by unworthy favourites, while they squandered the money wrung from the provinces on costly buildings and expensive gifts to the churches of the metropolis. They scattered money so lavishly as to empty the treasury, and allowed such licence to the officers of the army as to leave the Empire practically defenceless. Together, they consummated the financial ruin of the state.

The empire's enemies lost no time in taking advantage of this new situation. In the east the Turks invaded the empire, gradually eroding Byzantine control in Asia Minor. Meanwhile, in the west, the Serbs and Hungarians broke away from the empire for good, and in Bulgaria the oppressiveness of Angeloi taxation resulted in the Vlach-Bulgarian Rebellion late in 1185. The rebellion led to the establishment of the Second Bulgarian Empire on territory which had been vital to the empire's security in the Balkans.

Kaloyan of Bulgaria annexed several important cities, while the Angeloi squandered the public treasure on palaces and gardens and attempted to deal with the crisis through diplomatic means. Byzantine authority was severely weakened, and the growing power vacuum at the centre of the empire encouraged fragmentation, as the provinces began to look to local strongmen rather than the government in Constantinople for protection. This further reduced the resources available to the empire and its military system, as large regions passed outside central control.

=== Analysis of the Byzantine military collapse ===
==== Structural weaknesses ====
It was in this situation that the disintegration of the military 'theme' system, which had been the foundation of the empire's remarkable success from the eighth to eleventh centuries, revealed itself as a real catastrophe for the Byzantine state.

The first advantage of the theme system had been its numerical strength. It is thought that the Byzantine field army under Manuel I Komnenos (r. 1143–1180) had numbered some 40,000 men. However, there is evidence that the thematic armies of earlier centuries had provided the empire with a numerically superior force. The army of the theme of Thrakesion alone had provided about 9,600 men in the period 902–936, for example. Furthermore, the thematic armies had been stationed in the provinces, and their greater independence from central command meant that they were able to deal with threats quickly at a local level. This, combined with their greater numbers, allowed them to provide greater defense in depth.

The other key advantage of the theme system was that it had offered the Byzantine state good value for money. It provided a means of cheaply mobilising large numbers of men. The demise of the system meant that armies became more expensive in the long run, which reduced the numbers of troops that the emperors could afford to employ. The considerable wealth and diplomatic skill of the Komnenian emperors, their constant attention to military matters, and their frequent energetic campaigning, had largely countered this change. But the luck of the empire in having the talented Komnenoi to provide capable leadership was not a long-term solution to a structural problem in the Byzantine state itself.

After the death of Manuel I Komnenos in 1180, the Angeloi had not lavished the same care on the military as the Komneni had done, and the result was that these structural weakness began to manifest themselves in military decline. From 1185 on, Byzantine emperors found it increasingly difficult to muster and pay for sufficient military forces, while their incompetence exposed the limitations of the entire Byzantine military system, dependent as it was on competent personal direction from the emperor. The culmination of the empire's military disintegration under the Angeloi was reached on 13 April 1204, when the armies of the Fourth Crusade sacked Constantinople.

==== Conclusion ====
Thus, the problem was not so much that the Komnenian army was any less effective in battle (the thematic army's success rate was just as varied as that of its Komnenian counterpart); it is more the case that, because it was a smaller, more centralised force, the twelfth century army required a greater degree of competent direction from the emperor in order to be effective. Although formidable under an energetic leader, the Komnenian army did not work so well under incompetent or uninterested emperors. The greater independence and resilience of the thematic army had provided the early empire with a structural advantage that was now lost.

For all of the reasons above, it is possible to argue that the demise of the theme system was a great loss to the Byzantine empire. Although it took centuries to become fully apparent, one of the main institutional strengths of the Byzantine state was now gone. Thus it was not the army itself that was to blame for the decline of the empire, but rather the system that supported it. Without strong underlying institutions that could endure beyond the reign of each emperor, the state was extremely vulnerable in times of crisis. Byzantium had come to rely too much on individual emperors, and its continued survival was now no longer certain. While the theme system's demise did play a major role in the empire's military decline, other factors were important as well. These include:

- An increasing reliance on foreign mercenaries, which also contributed to the Byzantine Navy's decline.
- A long, slow decay in the quality and prestige of the ordinary, non-elite Byzantine infantry.
- A creeping Feudalism that helped to erode centralized administration.
- Increasing emulation of Western (or Latin) weapons, equipment and warfare methods, beginning especially during the reign of Manuel I Komnenos.

=== Armies of the successor states and of the Palaeologi ===
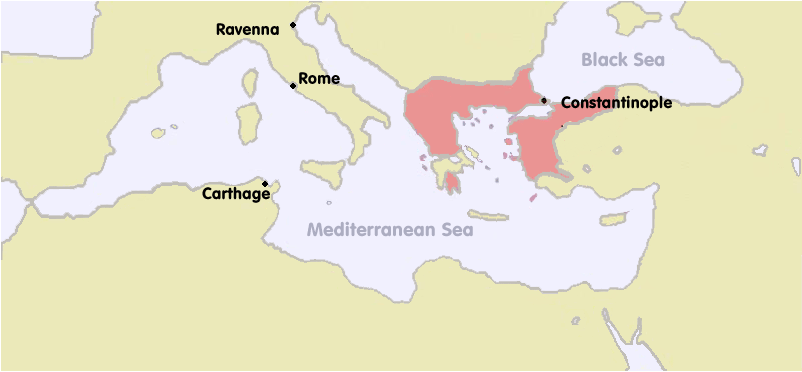
Map of the Byzantine Empire in c. 1270. After the damage caused by the collapse of the theme system, the mismanagement of the Angeloi and the catastrophe of the Fourth Crusade, for which the Angeloi were largely to blame, it proved impossible to restore the empire to the position it had held under Manuel Komnenos.

After 1204 the emperors of Nicaea continued some aspects of the system established by the Komneni. However, despite the restoration of the empire in 1261, the Byzantines never again possessed the same levels of wealth, territory and manpower that had been available to the Komnenian emperors and their predecessors. As a result, the military was constantly short of funds. After the death of Michael VIII Palaiologos in 1282, unreliable mercenaries such as the grand Catalan Company came to form an ever larger proportion of the remaining forces.

At the fall of Constantinople in 1453, the Byzantine army totaled about 7,000 men, 2,000 of whom were foreign mercenaries. Against the 80,000 Ottoman troops besieging the city, the odds were hopeless. The Byzantines resisted the third attack by the Sultan's elite Janissaries and according to some accounts on both sides were on the brink of repelling them, but a Genoan general in charge of a section of the defense, Giovanni Giustiniani, was grievously wounded during the attack, and his evacuation from the ramparts caused a panic in the ranks of the defenders. Many of the Italians, who were paid by Giustiniani himself, fled the battle.

Some historians suggest that the Kerkoporta gate in the Blachernae section had been left unlocked, and the Ottomans soon discovered this mistake – although accounts indicate that this gain for the Ottomans was in fact contained by defenders and pushed back. The Ottomans rushed in. Emperor Constantine XI himself led the last defense of the city by himself. Throwing aside his purple regalia, he stood in front of the oncoming Ottoman Turks with sword and shield in hand.

The emperor was struck twice by the Turk troops, the mortal blow being a knife to his back. There, on the walls of Constantinople, alone and abandoned by his remaining troops, the emperor died. The fall of the Byzantine capital meant the end of the Roman empire. The Byzantine army, the last surviving direct descendant of the Roman legions, was finished.

=== Manpower ===
The exact size and composition of the Byzantine army and its units is a matter of considerable debate, due to the scantness and ambiguous nature of the primary sources. The following table contains approximate estimates. All estimates excludes the number of oarsmen, for those estimates see Byzantine navy.

Manpower

Year	Army	±% p.a.
300	311,000	—
457	303,000	−0.02%
518	271,000	−0.18%
540	341,000	+1.05%
565	150,000	−3.23%
641	109,000	−0.42%
668	109,000	+0.00%
773	80,000	−0.29%
1025	110,000	+0.13%

Year	Army	±% p.a.
1077	25,000	−2.81%
1081	20,000	−5.43%
1143	50,000	+1.49%
1176	50,000	+0.00%
1282	20,000	−0.86%
1320	4,000	−4.15%
1321	3,000	−25.00%
1453	1,500	−0.52%

According to Mark Whittow the military resources of the Byzantine Empire were broadly comparable to those of other early medieval European states. As such Byzantium may not have been wealthier or more powerful than other European states, but it was more centralized and more united, and this was a vital factor in its survival. By using various Byzantine sources he estimates the entire cavalry forces of the empire, between the 8th and 10th centuries, were somewhere just over 10,000 and the number of infantry 20,000, and argues that the numbers of soldiers in Byzantine units should be numbered in the hundreds and not thousands, and the army in thousands and not tens of thousands. This however is argued by Warren Treadgold to be a result of incorrect reading of sources, such as confusing detachments of legions for the entire legions. The empire had demonstrable continuity of government and administration from antiquity until 1204, and had demonstrated a high degree of organization and standardization. Treadgold's analysis of sources finds that they support a Byzantine army that was "large and tightly organized" until its dissolution in the crisis of the 11th century. As such, the Middle Byzantine army was estimated to be significantly larger and was in no way comparable to contemporary Western European armies. Whittow's work shows many signs of carelessness and incorrect reading of sources.

Alexandru Madgearu cites an estimate of an army of 250,000 in 1025. Treadgold cites contemporary estimates of 80,000 in 773 and 120,000 in 840.

== Byzantine troop types ==
=== Cataphracts ===
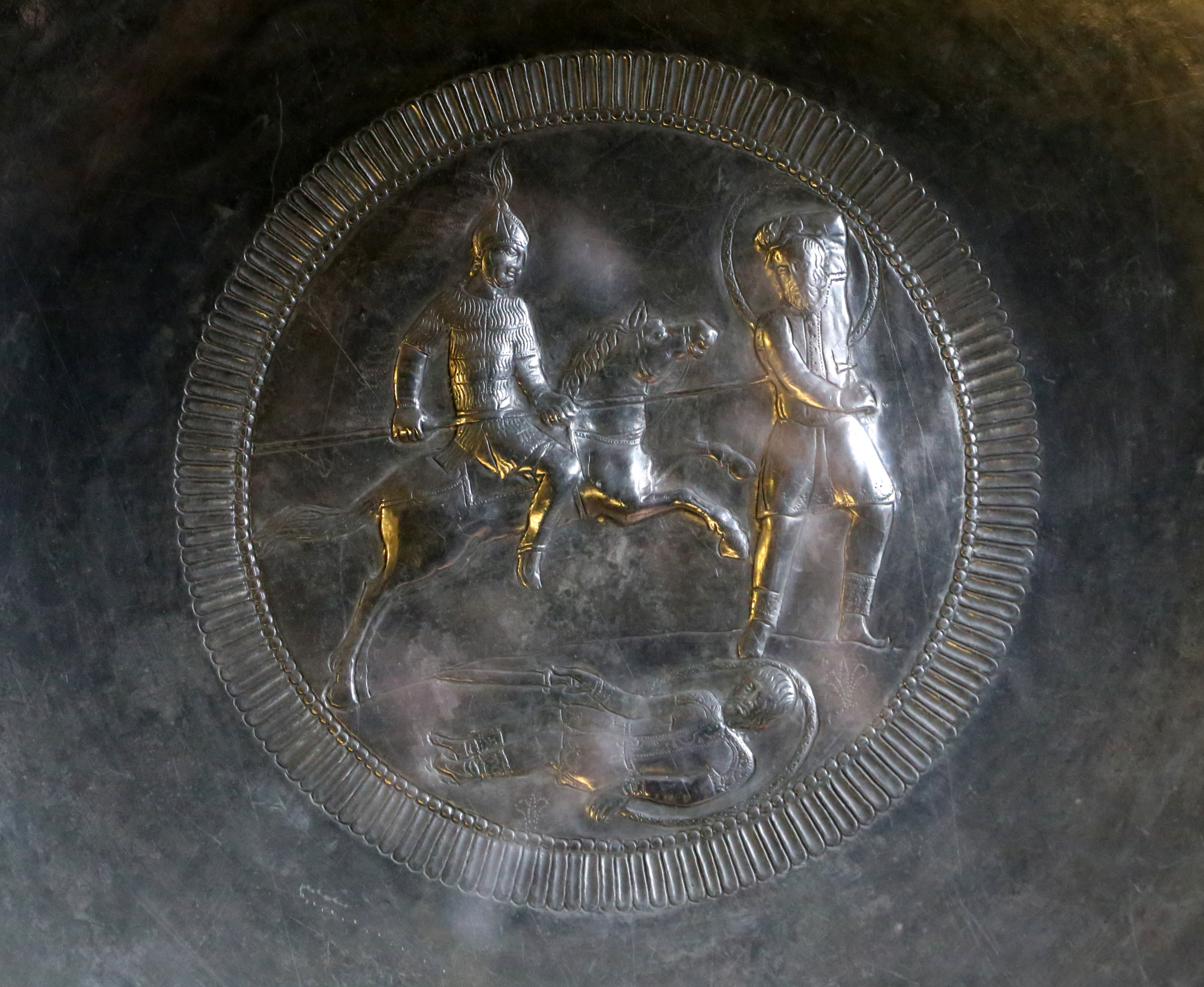
A heavy cavalryman (possibly a cataphract) lancing a Goth or Lombard, from the Isola Rizza dish

In response to the Persians fielding heavy cavalry that proved unmatched in head-to-head combat, the Byzantines attempted to replicate these elite units, calling them "cataphracts". The word cataphract (from the Greek κατάφρακτος, kataphraktos, with a literal meaning of 'completely armored' in English) was what Greek- and later Latin-speaking peoples used to describe heavy cavalry. Historically, the cataphract was a heavily armed and armoured cavalryman who saw action from the earliest days of Antiquity up through the High Middle Ages. Originally, the term cataphract referred to a type of armour worn to cover the whole body and that of the horse. Eventually the term described the cavalryman himself. The cataphracts were both fearsome and disciplined. Similar to the Persian units on which they were based, both man and horse were heavily armoured, the riders equipped with lances, bows and maces. These troops were slow compared to other cavalry, but their effect on the battlefield, particularly under the Emperor Nikephoros II, was devastating. More heavily armoured types of cataphract were called clibanarii (klibanophoroi). Over time these stopped being a distinctive unit and were subsumed by the cataphracts.

=== Cavalry ===
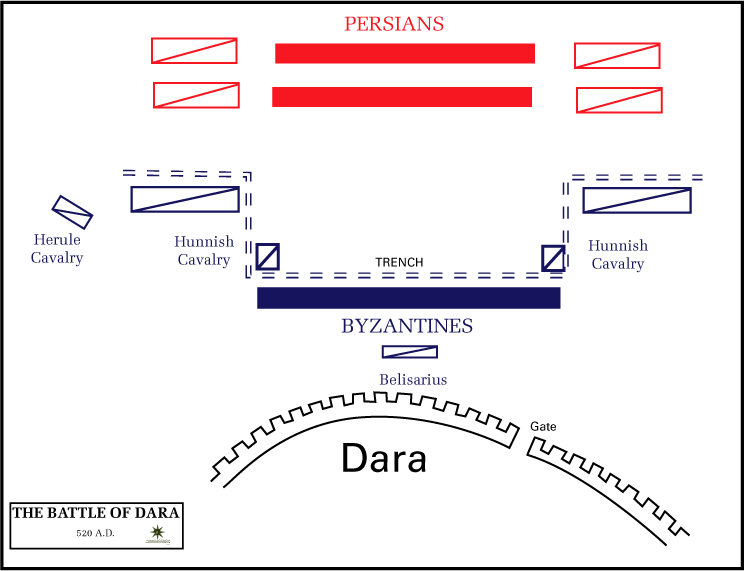
The deployment of the armies in the Battle of Dara (530), in which Byzantium employed various foreign mercenary soldiers, including the Huns.

The Byzantine cavalry were ideally suited to combat on the plains of Anatolia and northern Syria, which, from the seventh century onwards, constituted the principal battleground in the struggle against the forces of Islam. They were heavily armed using lance, mace and sword as well as strong composite bows which allowed them to achieve success against lighter, faster enemies, being particularly effective against both the Arabs and Turks in the east, and the Hungarians and Pechenegs in the west.

By the mid-Byzantine period (c. 900–1200) the regular mounted arm was broadly divided into katafraktoi (heavily armored and intended for shock action), koursorses (medium weight equipped with mail or scale armor) and lightly armed horse archers.

=== Infantry ===
The Byzantine Empire's military tradition originated in the late Roman period, taking as leading models the late Hellenistic armies and treatises of war, and its armies always included professional infantry soldiers. That being said, in the middle period especially infantry took a backseat to the cavalry, now the main offensive arm of the army. Equipment varied significantly, among the theme infantry most especially, but an average infantryman of the middle period would resemble earlier Hellenistic soldiers of old being equipped with a large spear, sword or axe, plumbata (lead-weighted darts), large oval, circular or kite shield, metal helmet or thick felt cap, and quilted or leather armour. Wealthier soldiers might be able to afford iron lamellar or even chain mail, but these were generally the preserve of the cavalry and officers; many military manuals of the 10th and 11th centuries do not even mention infantry wearing these being a possibility. Byzantine infantry were relatively lightly armored compared to their earlier Greco-Roman predecessors, their strength coming from their exceptional organization and discipline, not being clad in iron.

=== Pronoiars ===
Pronoiar troops began to appear during the twelfth century, particularly during the reign of the emperor Manuel I Komnenos (1143–1180). These were soldiers paid in land instead of money, but they did not operate under the old theme system of the middle Byzantine period. Pronoiai developed into essentially a license to tax the citizens who lived within the boundaries of the grant (the paroikoi). Pronoiars (those who had been granted a pronoia) became something like tax collectors, who were allowed to keep some of the revenue they collected.

These men are therefore generally considered to have been the Byzantine equivalent of western knights: part soldiers, part local rulers. However, the emperor was still the legal owner of the Pronoiars' land. Usually cavalry, pronoiars would have been equipped with mail armour, lances, and horse barding. Manuel re-equipped his heavy cavalry in western style at some point during his reign; it is likely that many of these troops would have been pronoiars. These troops became particularly common after 1204, in the service of the Empire of Nicaea in western Asia Minor.

=== Akrites ===
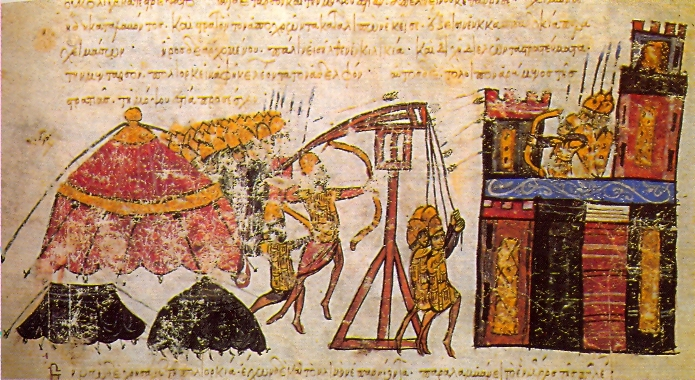
A siege by Byzantine forces, Skylitzes chronicle 11th century

Akrites (singular ακρίτας pronounced "akritas" - plural ακρίται in medieval/kathareuousa greek, pronounced "akrite", or ακρίτες in modern greek, pronounced "akrites") were defenders of the anatolian borders of the Empire. They appeared after the Arab conquests (7th century), and the system was developed during the isaurian dynasty (8th-9th c.), having their prime time during the macedonian dynasty (9th c - first half of 11th c.). The akrites were native Greeks of Anatolia (mostly Cappadocia and Pontus), who were given land in return for military service. For the purpose of border-protecting services, each akritas had the right and capacity to hire, equip and train their own small army of local levies and their granted lands could range from small farms to larger estates. Moreover, as the acritic songs suggest, apart from fighting against enemy invaders, they often fought between themselves in local civil wars, through which they could further enhance their lands and power at each other's expense. While no concrete written (or other) evidence exists, as far as their military equipment and organisation are concerned, the akrites were probably armed and organised in typical Byzantine gear of the period but in similar fashion to western European feudal knights. The wealthy land-owning lord Akritas would be heavily and richly armed, while his company of soldiers could be low-to-medium armed and according to their position and role on the battle-field: with a medium round shield or a larger oval or kite-shaped shield, thickly woven raw wool armour (nevrikon or kendouklon) or maille and even lamellar klivanion as defensive armour and spears, swords, maces, battle-axes bows and javelins as offensive equipment.

They were most adept at defensive warfare, often against raiding Arab horsemen in the Anatolian mountains, but could also cover the advance of the regular Byzantine army. Their tactics mostly relied on skirmishing and ambushes, but this was not at all because of lesser equipment or inferiority to match their eastern enemies in pitched battle, but instead a deliberate and consistent strategy to preserve and make the most possible out of the always limited and scarce human and material sources of the Empire. In fact this is the strategy and tactics that Emperor Nikephoros II Phokas has recorded in his "De velitatione bellica" military treatise. Furthermore, Greek folklore and traditional songs of the Byzantine era to the 19th century heavily feature Akrites and their supernaturally exaggerated exploits (see acritic songs).

== Foreign and mercenary soldiers ==
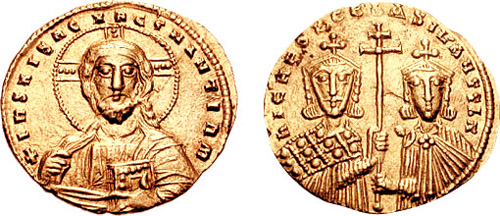
Coin of emperor Basil II, founder of the Varangian Guard.

The Byzantine army frequently employed foreign mercenary troops from many different regions. These troops often supplemented or assisted the empire's regular forces; at times, they even formed the bulk of the Byzantine army. But for most of the Byzantine army's long history, foreign and military soldiers reflected the wealth and might of the Byzantine Empire, for the emperor who was able to gather together armies from all corners of the known world was formidable.

Foreign troops during the late Roman period were known as the foederati ("allies") in Latin, and during the Byzantine period were known as the Phoideratoi (Gr. Φοιδεράτοι) in Greek. From this point, foreign troops (mainly mercenaries) were known as the Hetairoi (Gr. Ἑταιρείαι, "Companionships") and most frequently employed in the Imperial Guard. This force was in turn divided into the Great Companionships (Μεγάλη Εταιρεία), the Middle Companionships (Μέση Εταιρεία), and the Minor Companionships (Μικρά Εταιρεία), commanded by their respective Hetaireiarches – "Companionship lords". These may have been divided upon a religious basis separating the Christian subjects, Christian foreigners, and non-Christians, respectively.

=== Barbarian tribes ===
During the beginning of the 6th century, several barbarian tribes who eventually destroyed the Western Roman Empire in the 5th century eventually were recruited in the armies of the Byzantine Empire. Among them were the Heruli, who had deposed the last Western Roman Emperor Romulus Augustulus under their leader Odoacer in 476. Other barbarians included the Huns, who had invaded the divided Roman Empire during the second quarter of the 5th century under Attila, and the Gepids, who had settled in the Romanian territories north of the Danube River.

It was these same barbarian mercenaries that Emperor Justinian had used to help his army reclaim the lost Roman territories of the West, which including Italy, North Africa, Sicily, and Gaul. The Byzantine general Belisarius used Hunnic archers and Heruli mercenaries in his army to reclaim North Africa and the Balearic Islands from the Vandals, and in 535–537, he recruited Heruli infantry and Hunnic horsemen to help him secure Sicily and all of southern Italy, as well as defend the city of Rome from the Ostrogoths.

In 552, the Armenian general Narses defeated the Ostrogoths with an army that contained a large number of Germanic soldiers, including 3,000 Heruli and 400 Gepids. Two years later, Narses crushed a combined army of invading Franks and Alemanni with a Roman army that including a contingent of Heruli mercenary troops.

Additionally, during the Komnenian period, the mercenary units would simply be divided by ethnicity and called after their native lands: the Inglinoi (Englishmen), the Phragkoi (Franks), the Skythikoi (Scythians), the Latinikoi (Latins), and so on. Even Ethiopians served during the reign of Theophilos. These mercenary units, especially the Skythikoi, were also often used as a police force in Constantinople.

=== Varangian guard ===
The most famous of all Byzantine regiments was the legendary Varangian Guard. This unit traced its roots to the 6,000 Rus sent to Emperor Basil II by Vladimir of Kiev in 988. The tremendous fighting abilities of these axe-wielding, barbarian Northerners and their intense loyalty (bought with much gold) established them as an elite body, which soon rose to become the Emperors' personal bodyguard. This is further exemplified by the title of their commander, Akolouthos (Ακόλουθος, "Acolyte/follower" to the Emperor).

Initially the Varangians were mostly of Scandinavian origin, but later the guard came to include many Anglo-Saxons (after the Norman Conquest) as well. The Varangian Guard fought at the Battle of Beroia in 1122 with great distinction, and were present at the Battle of Sirmium in 1167, in which the Byzantine army smashed the forces of the Kingdom of Hungary.

== Byzantine weapons ==
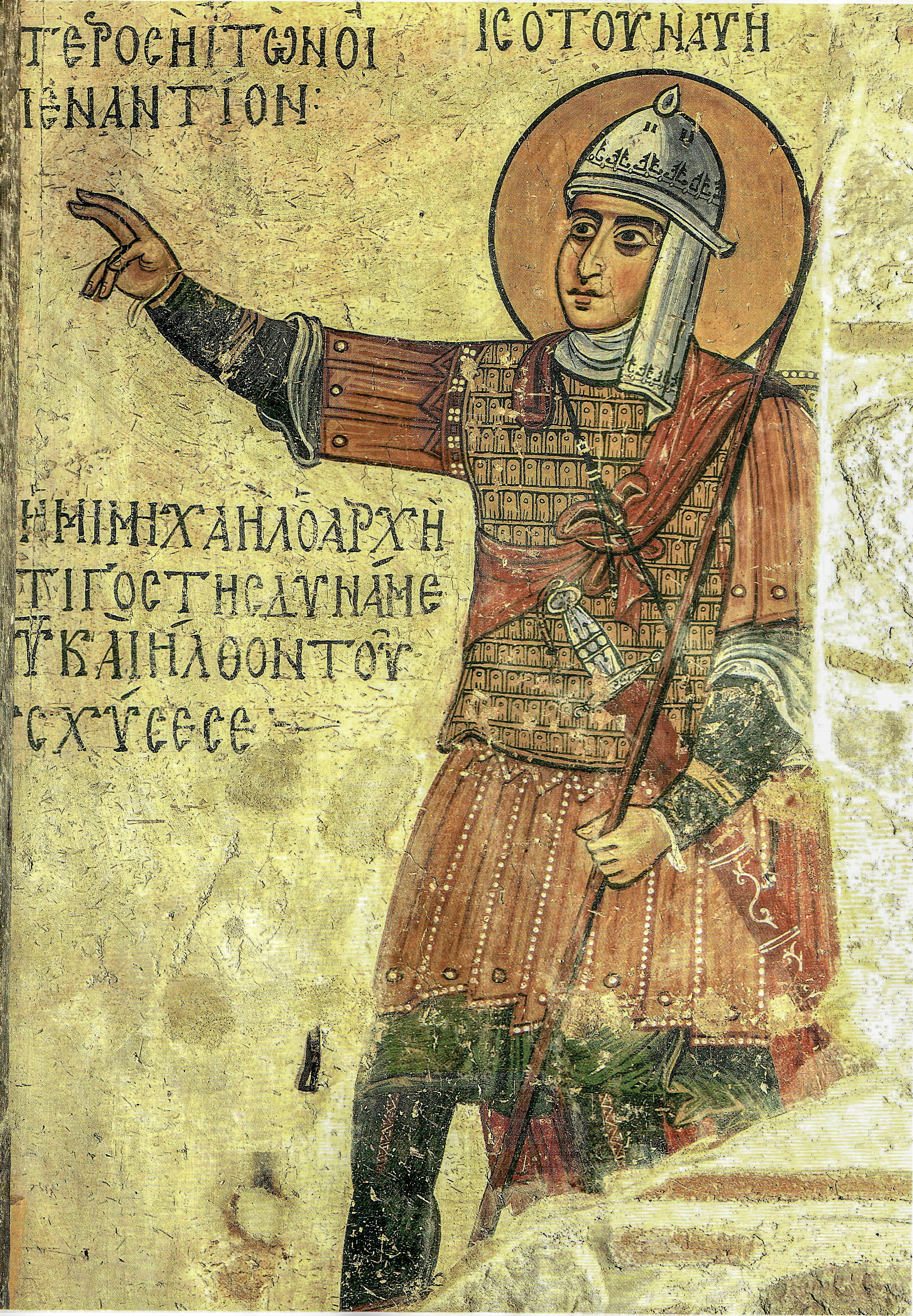
Byzantine fresco of Joshua from the Hosios Loukas monastery, 12th to 13th century. A good view of the construction of the lamellar klivanion cuirass. Unusually, the Biblical figure is shown wearing headgear; the helmet and its attached neck and throat defences appear to be cloth-covered. Joshua is shown wearing a straight spathion sword.

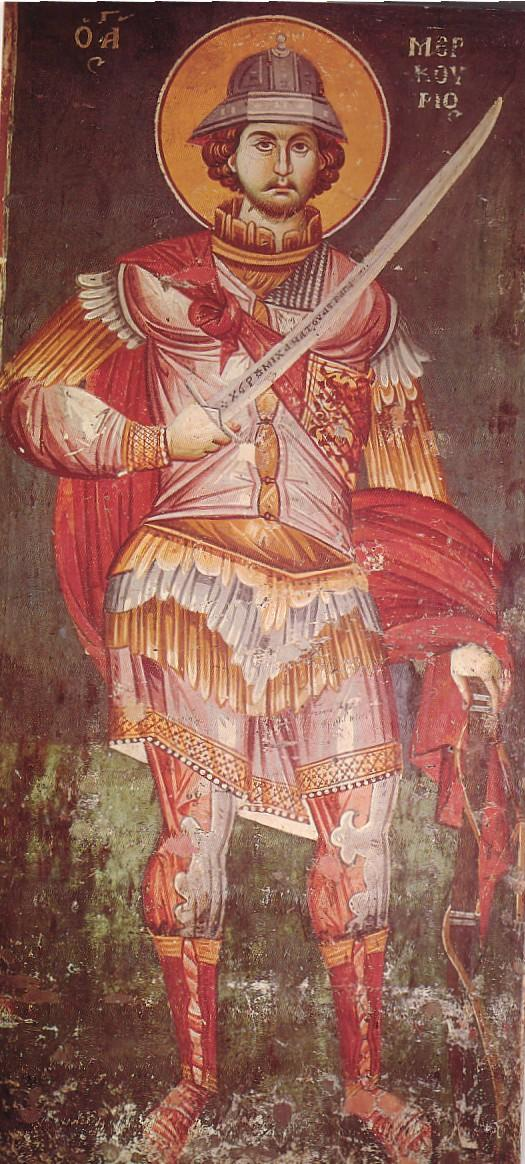
A Byzantine fresco of Saint Mercurius with a sword and helmet, dated 1295, from Ohrid, North Macedonia

=== Handheld weapons ===
The Byzantines originally used weapons developed from their Late Roman origins; the Romano-Germanic migration era longsword (spatha), lance (contus), javelins (spiculum, verutum, and lancea), the lead-weighted dart (plumbata), sling and staff-sling (fundum and fustibalus), and the Qum Darya-type ("Hunnic") recurve composite bow (arcus). However, as military technology changed, the Byzantines changed along with it, adopting new innovations in bow construction from the incoming Avars, Magyars, and Seljuk Turks, and adapting their infantry tactics and equipment to the changing reality of warfare as time progressed.

There were many sword (spathion) types; straight, curved, one- and two-handed, which are depicted in illustrations. According to Vegetius, by the 5th century the short Roman gladius had been abandoned in favor of a long two-edged sword, the spatha, used by both the infantry and cavalry. The tenth century Sylloge Tacticorum gives the length of this kind of sword as the equivalent of 94 cm and mentions a new saber-like sword of the same length, the paramerion, a curved one-edged slashing weapon for cavalrymen. Both weapons could be carried on a belt or a shoulder strap. A myriad of swords of Byzantine manufacture have been found dating to the 9th–11th centuries in the Balkans and Pontic region, namely consisting of the types "Garabonc", "Pliska", and "Galovo" after their findspots. These sword styles evolved separately from their western European counterparts, coming out of late antique Asiatic-type spathae introduced by the Alans and Huns, with fittings for the hilts and scabbards deriving from Persian styles, which were then given their own Byzantine fashion. They also have a relationship to the evolution of the sabre, a weapon that evolved out of the late antique Hunnic narrow langseax, which the Byzantines called a paramerion. Although dozens of sabers have been found from Bulgaria dating from the 8th–15th centuries, none can as of this moment be definitively identified as Byzantine examples. By the late 12th century, western arming swords had superseded most native Byzantine styles, such as the Oakeshott Type-10a found at Pernik.

Pikes and lances (kontaria) in the tenth century were approximately 4 meters long with an iron point (xipharion, aichme). One type of infantry spear, the menaulion, is described in detail; it was as thick as can fit in a man's palm, taken whole from young oak, cornel saplings, "or the so-called artzekidion" saplings. It was 1.9 to 3.1 meters in length with a 23–39 cm head, for use by medium infantrymen (called menaulatoi after their weapon) against enemy kataphraktoi – an excellent example of a weapon and a type of specialized soldier developed for a specific tactical role. Both light infantry and cavalry carried javelins (akontia or riptaria) no longer than two meters. Multiple spearheads have been found from 11th century Byzantine sites, namely the Drastar battlefield of 1081 AD, the Serce Limani shipwrecks, and the 12th–13th century Great Palace destruction layer.

Maces (called a rabdion, vardoukion, or matzouka) and axes (called a pelekion, axina, or tzikourion) served as shock weapons. The tenth century kataphraktoi were instructed to carry heavy iron maces (siderorabdia) – six-, four- or three-cornered – to bludgeon enemy soldiers through their armor. Double-headed symmetric and asymmetric battle axes, as well as single headed axes, are mentioned in the primary sources. Michael Psellos and Anna Komnene both mention the use of Dane axes by the Varangian Guard. A myriad of axeheads have been found from sites such as the Drastar battlefield, primarily single-bladed, but one highly decorated example from the Novi Pazar region of Bulgaria possesses a war pick opposite the head, corroborating the descriptions in the military manuals.

The sling or possibly the staff sling (sphendobolos), javelin (akontion or riptarion) and the bow (toxarion) were the weapons used by the middle ranks of infantry, skirmishers, and cavalry skirmishers and archers. The Byzantine bow, like the Imperial and Late Roman bow, was the composite, recurve type featuring a grip reinforced with lathes with asymmetric arms with horn siyahs which settled in reverse of the bow's natural flex when unstrung. Recurve composite bows of this period typically stood between 1.2 and 1.6 meters in length, like the 9th century examples from Moshchevaja Balka in the Caucasus, changing in form from Qum Darya-type (Hunnic), to Avar, to Magyar, to Seljuk as technology and cross-cultural contact progressed. The solenarion was a hollow tube through which an archer could launch several small darts (myas, i.e., "flies") rapidly using a thumb draw; Anna Komnene remarked that the Crusader's Western-type crossbow, which she called a tzangra, was unknown to Byzantium before the 12th century. Dawson's experimentation showed an estimated distance of 500 meters is possible with a recurve composite bow and the dart from a solenarion. Arrowheads were found in the excavations of Amorion and Sardis, although largely of types used for hunting, while war heads have been found at Pliska and Veliki Preslav. The crossbow was adopted by the Byzantine infantry in the 13th century, although the Cypriote rebel Isaac Komnenos is recorded to have used crossbowmen as early as 1191. They were also noted to be used during the siege of Constantinople in 1204. Associated primarily with western Europeans, the crossbow or tzangra remained of secondary relevance and was mostly restricted to naval combat and sieges. Soldiers wearing this weapon were known as tzangratoroi. Despite their relative rarity, John Kantakouzenos approvingly referred to their efficiency in siege battles, while a new military office was also created, the stratopedarches ton tzangratoron.

=== Shields ===
The shield (skoutarion) came in several forms in the middle Byzantine period, with large 107–118 cm ovoid and circular shields like earlier classical examples mostly giving way to the smaller 50–80 cm circular shield and the 90–100 cm oblong kite shield (sometimes called a thyreos) shortly before 900 AD. The rectangular shield, in use since classical antiquity, is also mentioned textually by the Sylloge Tacticorum and evidenced in art. The Tactica of Leo VI states that shield patterns and tunic color was matched by regiment, a feature also evidenced in the earlier Notitia Dignitatum, a late Roman register of offices and military units from the late 4th to early 5th century. Incidentally, some of those units are listed in the De Ceremoniis in its section on the expeditions to Crete and Italy in 911–949, including the Victores, the Theodosiaci, and the Stablesiani, although only the Victores can be identified with a specific unit with a shield pattern in the Notita Dignitatum. The majority of shield motifs took the form of geometric patterns, with radial bands, diamonds, Greek key motifs, and other forms all being popular. Inscriptions are also frequent on shields, typically in pseudo-Kufic script, but on occasions actual Greek inscriptions are also present. Crosses are also evidenced starting in the 12th century, as attested by Niketas Akominatos, and proto-heraldic patterns appear by the 12th–13th century, including lions and chequering. Stars and crescent moons are also attested, being native to the regions of Thrace, Anatolia, and the Peloponnese, with a red-and-white star and crescent being the signature motif of the Tzakones marines and guard regiment in the 13th–14th centuries.

=== Armor ===
Arms and armor are well attested at the end of late antiquity, with Niederstotzingen-type lamellar armor (klivanion) being introduced around 520 AD as evidenced at the fort of Halmyris in Romania. More than a dozen individual lamellar cuirasses are known from late Roman sites in the Balkans, such as at Caricin Grad (Justiniana Prima), attesting their widespread use by the Roman army. The majority of lamellar armors in Europe from the 6th–7th centuries are of late Roman manufacture, which were gifted to and then found in the burials of Germanic and Avar nobles, although a handful were of local make. Maille (lorikion) is also conclusively evidenced in artwork, and a lamellar armor similar to that from Kunszentmarton was found in the late antique layers at Cartago Spartaria, from after Justinian's reconquest. Fragments of maille armor are also well attested in archaeology, either in the form of helmet aventails or fragments of torso haubergons, and a full hauberk is known from the 6th century Germanic grave of Gammertingen. Late Roman maille armor was made in the same fashion as coptic tunics, being formed out of one large cross-shaped sheet of links and then folded in half, and joined up the sides with riveted rows on the front connected to rows solid links on the back, usually with small splits left at the lower hem of the skirt at either side for mobility. Limb armor is also mentioned in period literature, with the Strategikon of Maurice referring to kheiromanika sidera ("iron hand-sleeves," probably eastern in origin), and ocreae, okridia, or periknemides (greaves). Avar splinted greaves with scale sabatons have been found at Kölked-Feketekapu, similar to the splinted greaves with maille sabatons from Valsgarde. Lamellar hand-guard reinforcements are evidenced from Sovizzo, Rome, and Crypta Balbi in Italy, while a myriad of maille examples are evidenced from the 6th–8th century Caucasus. A pair of 7th-century plate gauntlets is also known from the Sochi district in the Krasnodar region of Russia.

Helmets from the 6th–8th centuries are incredibly well evidenced, belonging to three main forms: the lamellar helmet, band helmet, and spangenhelm, all of which were used by the late Roman army at that time. Late Roman ridge helmets and early conical helmets of the kind found at Staritsa and Apsaros may also have been present, with the former being in the decline and the latter slowly growing in popularity. The dominant forms were the Narona-type band helmet, the Leiden/Novae-type spangenhelm, and the Baldenheim-type spangenhelm. Niederstotzingen-type lamellar helmets were also in used, as evidenced by the find from the 6th–7th century arms manufacturing center of Stara Zagora. However, these forms fell out of use some time in the late 7th to mid-8th centuries, being supplanted by newer types and the medieval conical helmet. The gorget (peritrakhelion) is also mentioned, although it is uncertain if this took the form of maille and cloth aveintails, or the earlier plate gorgets like those from Chatalka and Tarasovo.

Scale (Thorax Pholiodotos), Maille (Zava, Lorikion, or Thorax Halusidotos), and Lamellar (Klivanion) are all evidenced in artwork from the 6th–14th centuries, alongside some form of defensive cloth armor (Zava, Kavadion, Bambakion, or Neurikon). Skirts attached to this armor were called kremasmata and could be made of maille, defensive cloth, scale, or lamellar. Pteryges (ptera) are also evidenced, alongside pauldrons (mela), arm armour (manikia, manikellia, kheiropsella, kheiromanika) and leg armour (khalkotouba, periknemides, podopsella). However, the credibility and realism of Byzantine art is a deeply disputed subject, with some modern researchers choosing to take it literally to the letter, while others point out that it is a hugely unreliable source, because of the very abstract and symbolic nature and style of Byzantine Greek orthodox art. Moreover, there survive no archeological finds for any of the most prominent armour elements in Byzantine iconography, therefore rendering them highly disputable. In general, medieval military archeology is heavily recantive of Byzantine iconography, which apart from a loose and highly debatable matching with terminology in period Byzantine literature, attempted by certain modern researchers, indeed does appear highily anachronistic for medieval warfare. In short, the infamous "byzantine banded scale" or "byzantine lamellar" seen in art has never been found archaeologically. Of course, it is true that archaeological evidence for Byzantine armor in general is decidedly poor, and most importantly, there are almost no archeological excavations of Byzantine period battle sites from modern Greece and Turkey. For example, there are a myriad of finds of helmets and body armors from the end of late antiquity in the 6th–7th century, but only sparse examples from the North Balkans and the Crimea being spread out across more than 600 years. However, the archeological finds that do exist are not negligible at all, while their list has only grown over the last years (and they are all mostly invalidating of the today prevalent profile of the "typical byzantine" armor). The most prominent finds are a 10th-century silvered brass maille hauberk from Stara Zagora, Bulgaria, housed in the museum at Sofia, the maille hauberk of the Iveron Monastery, and multiple maille hauberks found at the site of middle Byzantine Cherson in the Crimea, as well as a single fragment of a lamellar armor. However, a significant collection of 10th c lamellar fragment finds has been discovered around modern-day Bulgaria, in sites such as Pliska and Veliki Preslav, which are of the same lamellar type and style as the Cherson Byzantine find. Moreover, another type of lamellar armor was found in the destruction layer of the Great Palace in Istanbul, possibly from the late 12th or early 13th century. A foot from a maille chausse was also found in the catacombs at Kyulchevka Village in Bulgaria, dating to between the 9th–11th centuries AD. Three helmets of "phrygian" type have been found from Branicevo, Serbia, and Pernik, Bulgaria, all dating to approximately the time of the Bulgarian revolt of 1185. The Aleksandr Nevskii helmet housed in the Kremlin Armory is also believed to have been made in Constantinople, and dates to the 13th–14th centuries. Finally, a hoarde of Italian armor was cleared out from Hagia Eirene in 1839, believed to be from the siege of Constantinople in 1453, but none of the pieces have ever been located. Italian armor is well known from other sites in the Balkans, such as Chalkis and Rhodes, where some equipment is believed to have been re-used by local Byzantines in Venetian employ when they fell out of fashion.

=== Artillery ===
The Traction Trebuchet is believed to have been carried over from China to Europe by the Avars in the 550s–580s AD, where it was quickly adopted by the late Roman army, calling it a manganikon or alakatia, hence the term "mangonel." Counterweight trebuchets are believed to have been invented in the middle Byzantine period, as Anna Komnene claims new artillery was invented by Alexios Komnenos in 1097, and counterweight trebuchets are described shortly thereafter in the 1120s onwards. Alongside trebuchets, the Tactica of Leo VI mentions the use of the toxobolistra, which is further described by the De Ceremoniis' section on the expeditions to Crete as being an iron-framed torsion engine the same as that from late antiquity. Finally, the siphon and kheirosiphon were used to project Greek Fire, both from warships and walls.

== Byzantine military doctrine ==
Unlike the Roman legions, the Byzantine army's strength was in its armoured cavalry Cataphracts, which evolved from the Clibanarii of the late empire. Its type of warfare and tactics were evolving from the Hellenistic military manuals and the Infantry were still used but mainly in support roles and as a base of maneuver for the cavalry.

According to David Nicolle, "Almost more important than tactics was the question of morale, and Byzantine leaders paid close attention to this. Byzantium's role as the Christian Empire was central to its morale. Careful religious preparations preceded a battle,” which included the parading of crosses, relics and images–which all "had a profound impact upon the men's mind."

== Major battles of the Byzantine Empire ==
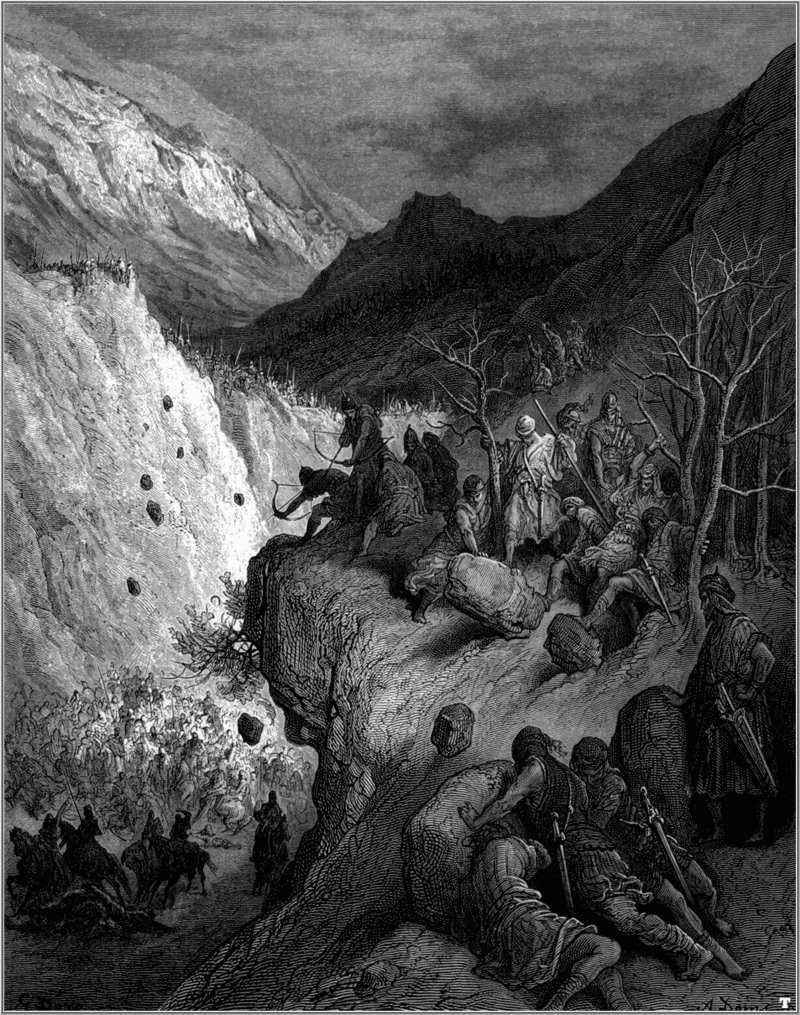
This image by Gustave Doré shows the Turkish ambush at the Battle of Myriokephalon (1176)

=== Early Byzantine period ===
- Battle of Thannuris (528)
- Battle of Dara (530)
- Battle of Satala (530)
- Battle of Callinicum (531)
- Battle of Tricamarum (533)
- Battle of Ad Decimum (533)
- Battle of Mammes (534)
- Siege of Rome (537-538)
- Siege of Edessa (544)
- Battle of Sufetula (546/547)
- Battle of Taginae (552)
- Battle of the Volturnus (554)
- Siege of Phasis (556)
- Battle of Melitene (576)
- Battle of the Lycus (626)
- Battle of Nineveh (627)
- Battle of Mu'tah (629)
- Battle of Firaz (634)
- Battle of Ajnadayn (634)
- Battle of Fahl (635)
- Battle of Yarmouk (636)
- Battle of the Iron Bridge (637)
- Battle of Ongal (680)
- Battle of Carthage (698)
- Siege of Constantinople (717–718)

=== Middle Byzantine period ===
- Battle of Pliska (811)
- Battle of Versinikia
- Battle of Boulgarophygon (896)
- Battle of Achelous (917) (917)
- Siege of Chandax (960-961)
- Sack of Aleppo (962)
- Battle of Arcadiopolis (970)
- Siege of Dorostolon
- Battle of the Gates of Trajan (986)
- Battle of Kleidion (1014)
- Battle of Manzikert (1071)
- Battle of Dyrrhachium (1081)
- Battle of Kalavrye
- Battle of Levounion (1091)
- Siege of Nicaea (1097)
- Battle of Dorylaeum (1097)
- Battle of Beroia (1122)
- Battle of Sirmium (1167)
- Battle of Myriokephalon (1176)
- Battle of Arcadiopolis (1194)

=== Late Byzantine period ===
- Siege of Constantinople (1203)
- Sack of Constantinople
- Battle of Antioch on the Meander (1211)
- Battle of Klokotnitsa
- Battle of Pelagonia (1259)
- Reconquest of Constantinople
- Battle of Bapheus
- Siege of Bursa
- Battle of Pelekanon (1329)
- Fall of Constantinople (1453)
- Siege of Trebizond (1461)

== See also ==
- Byzantine battle tactics
- Byzantine bureaucracy
- East Roman army
- Roman navy
- Late Roman army
