= Praecepta Militaria =

Byzantine military treatise circa 965

The Praecepta Militaria is the Latin conventional title given to a Byzantine military treatise, written in ca. 965 by or on behalf of Eastern Roman emperor Nikephoros Phokas (r. 963–969). Its Greek title is Στρατηγικὴ ἔκθεσις καὶ σύνταξις Νικηφόρου δεσπότου Strategikè ékthesis kaì syntaxis Nikephórou despótou ("Presentation and Composition on Warfare of the Lord Nikephoros").

The treatise comprises six chapters and presents the Byzantine army as it had evolved by the mid-10th century, during the campaigns of the "Byzantine Reconquest" against the Arabs in the East. As such, the treatise contains several novel aspects not touched upon in other Byzantine military manuals, such as an exact account of the formation and use of the cataphracts wedge, the new mixed infantry brigade (taxiarchia), the proper formation of intervals between units and of how they should be guarded, and the use of the menavlon spear. The treatise generally emphasizes on the practical aspects of warfare: various operational scenarios are discussed, as well as the setting up of camps, reconnaissance and the use of spies. The army's religious ceremonies are also emphasized, reflecting Phokas' own religious zeal. The chapters are included and partially amended to account for the early 11th-century situation in the later Tactica of Nikephoros Ouranos.

== Contents ==
- Chapter I - On the Infantry
- Chapter II - On the Heavy Infantry
- Chapter III - On the Kataphraktoi
- Chapter IV - Ordinance on Cavalry Deployment
- Chapter V - On the Encampment
- Chapter VI - Concerning Spies

== Tactics ==
The treatise begins by describing the equipment, deployment, and tactics of the infantry. It then discusses the tactics for both infantry and cavalry in battle situations against a combined enemy force of infantry and cavalry. The focus then turns to the deployment of the kataphraktoi and general tactics for cavalry fighting independently against both infantry and cavalry. Three aspects of battle have particular attention paid to them: how infantry were to defend against cavalry, how the kataphraktoi were to attack infantry, and how an army should pursue a defeated enemy.

=== Infantry ===
The standard infantry formation described in the treatise is a hollow square with intervals purposely placed in the lines of heavy infantry so that cavalry could enter or exit the square. The intervals were protected by light infantry, such as javeliners, slingers, and archers, who would engage and disrupt approaching enemies to allow time for the heavy infantry to form up properly. Some of the tactical changes Phokas introduced to improve the infantry’s ability to defend against heavy cavalry are detailed in the treatise. One of the most significant of these changes was to place menavlatoi, or heavy spearmen, within the front ranks.

=== Cavalry ===
The deployment and formation of cavalry is highly detailed in the treatise, outlining the structure and placement of each unit within the entire cavalry force and defining the individual tactical role for each unit. The most significant tactic detailed in the treatise is the deployment of the kataphraktoi in a wedge, or triangle formation. The front and outside lines of the wedge was made up of men armed with either a mace or a lance while the inside of the wedge was made up of mounted archers. During a charge, the archers would fire at the enemy’s front line to weaken it before the wedge arrived. This tactic was used as an attempt to break down the enemy both physically and morally.

== Historical Context ==
Praecepta Militaria was made by Nikephoros Phokas to be a manual for his army’s offensive campaigns against Cilicia and northern Syria in the 960s. These offensive campaigns were part of the Byzantine-Hamdanid wars that occurred in the mid-10th century. This treatise marks a change in strategy during the wars as it was distributed around the time the Byzantine Empire began to act more aggressive and took the offensive.

Praecepta militaria was not a treatise that introduced completely original tactics. Instead, Phokas revised existing tactics by combining them with his own experience and observations. Many of the infantry tactics from Praecepta Militaria were likely based on those found in Syntaxis Armatorum Quadrata (ca. 950). Even more influential was the Sylloge Tacticorum (compiled ca. 950), which was a collection of tactics and strategems. This collection likely provided many of the sources for Praecepta militaria’s instructions regarding equipment and deployment for both infantry and cavalry. Praecepta Militaria acted as an update to existing Byzantine military tactics in order to stay up to date with its enemies. Later Byzantine military treatises, such as Nikephoros Ouranos’ Tactica, would continue this process by using, and revising, the tactics of Praecepta Militaria as well.
