= Tactica of Emperor Leo VI the Wise =

Military treatise c. 900 CE

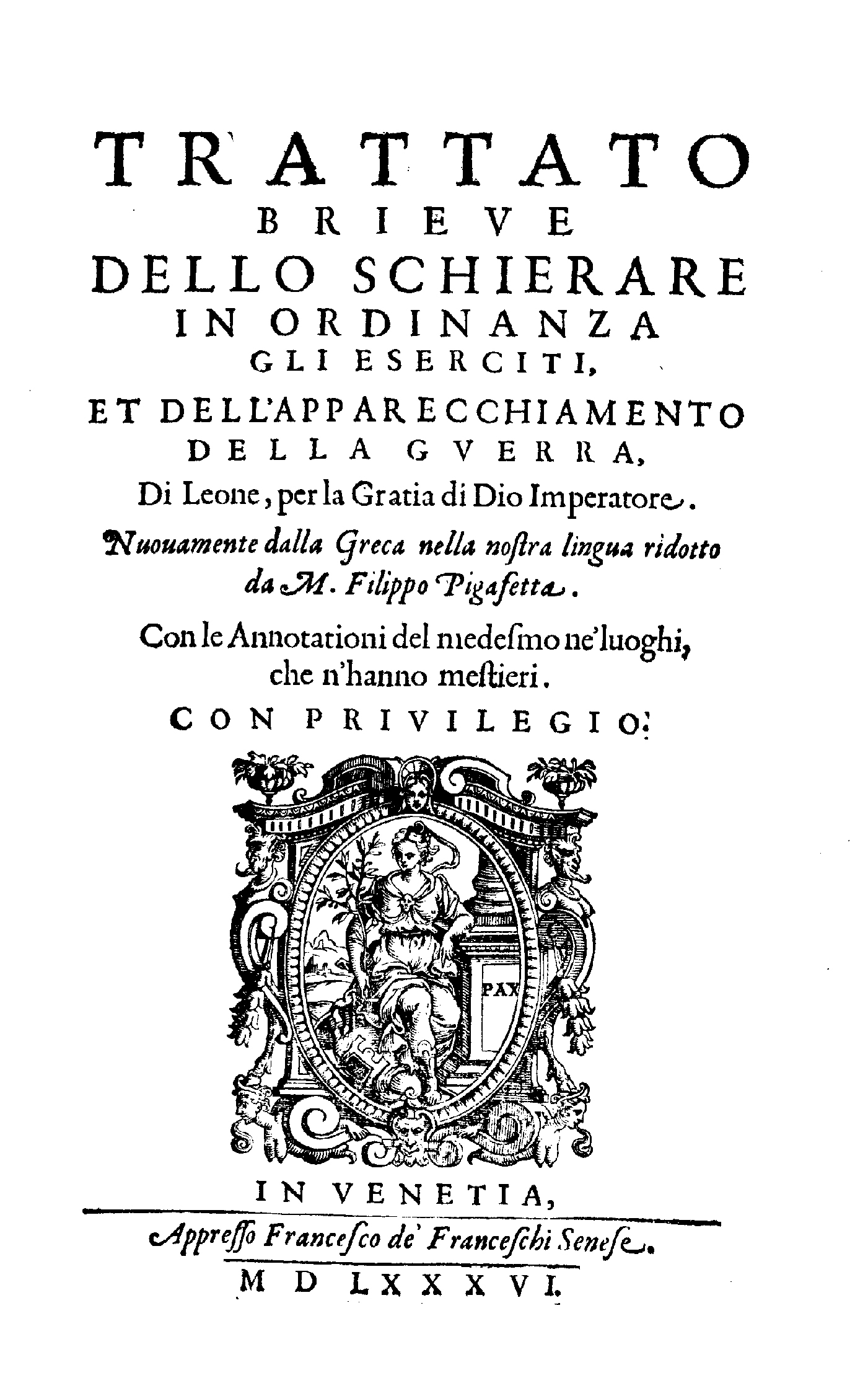
Tactica (Italian edition, 1586)

The Tactica (Greek: Τακτικά) is a military treatise written by or on behalf of Byzantine Emperor Leo VI the Wise in c. 895–908, and later edited by his son, Constantine VII. Drawing on earlier authors such as Aelian, Onasander and the Strategikon of emperor Maurice, it is one of the major works on Byzantine military tactics, written on the eve of Byzantium's "age of reconquest". The original Greek title is τῶν ἐν πολέμοις τακτικῶν σύντομος παράδοσις ("short instruction of the tactics of war"). The Tactica elaborates on a wide variety of issues, such as infantry and cavalry formations, drills, siege and naval warfare etc. It is written in a legislative form of language and comprises 20 Constitutions (Διατάξεις Diataxeis) and an Epilogue and is concluded by 12 additional chapters, the latter mainly focusing on ancient tactics.

== Manuscripts, editions and translations ==
The text of the Tactica is transmitted in several manuscript prototypes, of which the most authoritative date to within a generation of Leo himself. Leo mentions within the Tactica, that Christianity could adopt Islam's doctrine of a "holy war" for its military applications.

An edition with English translation by G. T. Dennis (ed.), The Taktika of Leo VI. Text, Translation and Commentary ([CFHB 49] Dumbarton Oaks, Washington, D.C. 2010), was translated from a 10th-century Florentine manuscript.

There is evidence for an Arabic translation of the Tactica or at least an Arabic epitome. Two works by the 14th-century Egyptian writer Ibn Manglī reference and quote the Marātib al-ḥurūb of Leo VI. The passages can be shown to have been taken from the Tactica, occasionally with interpolations making them more relevant to 14th-century Egypt. It is unclear if Ibn Manglī was the translator.

== Synopsis ==
The twenty first chapters are largely taken from Strategikon written during the reign of the Emperor Maurice between 582 and 602, but they were adapted according to the vision of Leo VI.

The text contains some drafting problems, it falls very often in unnecessary repetition and word use, despite the promises of the Emperor's preface to the reader: "I tried as much as I could to make my narration simple, clear and precise.

=== Chapters ===
- Preface
- Chapter I - On Tactics and On the General
- Chapter II - On who the General should be
- Chapter III - On how the Decision should be taken
- Chapter IV - On the Division of the Host and the Condition of the Officers
- Chapter V - On Arms
- Chapter VI - On the Equipment of Cavalry and Infantry
- Chapter VII - On Drilling Infantry and Cavalry
- Chapter VIII - On Military Punishments
- Chapter IX - On Marching
- Chapter X - On Baggage Trains
- Chapter XI - On Camps
- Chapter XII - On Military Preparation
- Chapter XIII - On the Day before Battle
- Chapter XIV - On the Day of Battle
- Chapter XV - On Besieging a Town
- Chapter XVI - On the Actions after the War is Concluded
- Chapter XVII - On Surprise Attacks
- Chapter XVIII - On the Studying of Various Heathen and Roman Formations
- Chapter XIX - On Naval Warfare
- Chapter XX - On Various Maxims
- Epilogue

Additions from the Sylloge Tacticorum

- Chapter XXXII - Their (Ancient Greek) Infantry Formations
- Chapter XXXIII - Their (Ancient Greek) Cavalry Formations
- Chapter XXXIV - Their (Ancient Greek) Mixed Formations
- Chapter XXXV - How the Romans Name the Officers of the Army and their Units
- Chapter XXXVIII - Roman Infantry Arms
- Chapter XXXIX - Roman Cavalry Arms
- Chapter XLI - Names of Troop Maneuvers
- Chapter XLII - Phalanx Formations
- Chapter XLIII - On Depth, that is the Depth of Infantry and Cavalry Formations, their Length and the Space Occupied by an Infantryman within the Formation, the Cavalryman and on the Interval between them within the Formations and on the Flight of an Arrow.
- Chapter LIII - What the General Should Do When Besieged
- Chapter LIV - What Should the General Do When Besieging the Enemy
- Chapter LV - How Should the General Speedily Build a Fort close to Enemy Border Without a Pitched Battle

=== Preface ===
The emperor announces what is in question in this work, that is to say: not to forget the old military tactics and to teach the modern ones. According to him, they seem to be neglected or even forgotten by his generals, he also states that the use of tactics and military knowledge is better than relying on the number of his troops: “[…] it is not with a multitude men whom the war ends happily, […], but by the science of tidying them up, of moving them and of sparing them.

=== Chapter I – On Tactics and On the General ===
This first chapter first explains the interpretation of tactics, it is described as “the science of movements that are made in war […] the art of arranging the troops and arranging the various weapons. ". In a second step, one evokes the separation of the military personnel in two categories: "the people intended to fight" (troops on foot and troops on horseback) and "those who follow" (all the servants, doctors and other personnel. non-combatant soldiers). Thirdly, we state what are the functions and responsibilities of a general: “[…] he is in charge of the civil and military administration of the province where he commands, of assembling the dispersed troops, of training them. army corps and to maintain discipline […] ”. This description of responsibility refers to the administrative system of Themes (Greek: θεματα: Themata)

=== Chapter II – On who the General should be ===
This chapter sets out many qualities or aspects that a good general or strategist (Greek: στρατηγός, strategos) should possess. Here is the list of the most important:

- He should not rule out of greed, but rather out of devotion to his task: “[…] that he will despise money when he will not allow corruption to be corrupted, that he will govern [...] with no other goal than the honor of them. make it successful. "
- He should not be too young or too old because: "[…] youth is inconstant and without light and […] old age […] lacks the strength to act […]".
- He must be loved by his men: “An affectionate general of the troops will govern them easily […] will not refuse at any risk. "
- He must be a charismatic orator: “The voice of a general is better than the sound of the trumpet; it moves the soul with more force, […] "
- He should not be named after his fortune but rather for his skills regardless of his wealth.
- He must be a faithful and pious Christian: “[…] without his divine assistance nothing will succeed […]; that without it you will not overcome the weakest enemies, because Providence governs everything, […] ”.

=== Chapter III – On how the Decision should be taken ===
This chapter deals with the process through which a decision or a plan, whether administrative or military, should go through. It is first necessary to form a council of persons deemed relevant to a deliberation of the plan envisaged by the general. This advice is used to discuss the appropriateness of the plan, how it should be applied and why it should be executed. The participants in the deliberation must always have a public and not a personal vision during the council. It is also advisable that the participants in the debates be discreet so as not to reveal anything, it is also said that an action proposed during a council must be possible and useful otherwise it will be judged as reckless. Finally, it is said that it is possible to hold counseling alone (if that turns out to be the only option).

=== Chapter IV – On the Division of the Host and the Condition of the Officers ===
This chapter first deals with recruiting troops whether or not they type of people. Then how the army should organize its troops and which hierarchy to adopt (see Theme ). It is therefore also a question of all the ranks or functions possibly used in an army, here are the most important:

- General (Στρατεγος, Strategos )
- Lieutenant-General (ὑποστρατεγος, Hypostrategos)
- Drongaria (Δρουνγαριος, Droungarios )
- Count (Κόμης, Komes )
- Centurion (Κενταρχος, Kentarchos )
- Decade Rosary (Δεκαρχος, Dekarchos )

Numerous other functions are listed as: the door-sign (Βανδοφορε, Bandophore), the leader (πρωτοστάτης, Protostates), Spies (Σκουλακάτορες, Skoulkatores) Doctors (Σκριβονες, Skribones) and others. Finally, it is also question of the organization of the men in the various formations of displacement and the knowledge required for the Centurions and the Decades.

=== Chapter V – On Arms ===
In this chapter, it is stated that weapons must always be in a condition suitable for immediate use. It is also listed what types of weapons, armor and equipment the different armed troops must be equipped. It is also considered to take into account the use of wagons in the transport of food, weapons, personnel or other materials. The potential use of different siege weapons (if he must have one) is also mentioned, as well as the use of small wooden boats to cross waterways or of transport / warships if the use of these vessels is necessary in the current situation.

=== Chapter VI – On the Equipment of Cavalry and Infantry ===
The chapter discusses everything related to armor and paraphernalia of equipment that archers, horsemen and infantrymen must wear (detailing especially the last two). Also categorizing at the same time the different army corps:

- The cavalry: the cataphracts (καταφρακτοι, katafraktoi, a cavalry with heavy armor) and the non-cataphracts (κουρσορσες, koursorses, grouping together jet cavalry and spear cavalry)
- The infantrymen: the shield holders (Σκουτατοι, Skoutatoi, derived from the Greek hoplites ) and the psilists (Πσιλοι, Psiloi, armed with a bow and little protected)

Apart from the equipment enumerations, we find here that various advice: "The more the soldier is armed and dressed neatly, the more it raises his courage and intimidates the enemy." ". Used during winter or rest periods to know that equipment or animals are missing or needed. He concludes the chapter by echoing the ancient types of infantry that are the peltasts and the Macedonian phalanges.

=== Chapter VII – On Drilling Infantry and Cavalry ===
This part deals with the different training and tasks that soldiers must do when they are at rest. These exercises should accustom soldiers to the dangers that await them, keep them ready and keep them motivated. The trainings carried out are numerous and different according to the class of the soldier (hoplite, archer, rider, etc.), they can be carried out alone or in groups, it can sometimes be a competition between two teams or the practice of training and voice commands. or simply cleaning and maintenance tasks. All these exercises seek to forge bonds of camaraderie between the soldiers and their officer and to prevent them from becoming idle during their encampment. The chapter describes very precisely the exercises, training and "simulations" battle that can be taught and practiced during these rest periods. There is also a list of voice command to teach soldiers and officers.

=== Chapter VIII – On Military Punishments ===
This section discusses the penalties that can be applied to soldiers and persons of higher rank. These punishments vary greatly depending on the wrongdoing ranging from the death penalty, punishment, corporal punishment, restitution or fine.

=== Chapter IX – On Marching ===
This section offers many instructions and tips to follow when moving an army into friendly or enemy territory. It mentions among other things that: the march protects the patrolled region against looting by the enemy, that the soldiers must be disciplined from the start so that they are organized in the event of an attack or that they do not go into rout if a wild beast is crossed and ultimately prevent them from pouncing on potential loot when walking. The chapter also gives several tips and precautions to take in order to prevent accidents or ambushes when the troop must pass through narrow places, passes, rivers or what to do in the absence of a guide. We also find the importance of using scouts and avoiding enemy ones.

=== Chapter X – On Baggage Trains ===
This chapter deals with the defense, organization of baggage and the following of an army and these must be protected and safe. The contrary would be very harmful for the soldier going into combat, he must have a serene mind as regards the safety of the non-combatants who follow them (servants, women and children): “[…] the fear of losing what 'we have more money, we only show up for combat with reluctance and trembling. ”. It is also a question of how the protected according to the situation and what type of baggage the soldier must bring according to the situation: long-term expedition, race in enemy territory or border defense.

=== Chapter XI – On Camps ===
This part gives advice on the correct setting up of a camp: the choice of the terrain (uncovered and far from a humid environment), avoid being close to a land that the enemy could use, dig a ditch around the camp, always having a guard, always treating the enemy as if they were close, etc. It is also recommended not to stay too long in one place, in order to avoid the accumulation of waste which could lead to disease. If the camp is to last longer, it must be better fortified and the soldiers must remain active and not be idle, while all parties or games are prohibited overnight. The importance of good supplies and the defense of neighboring inhabitants to the camp, if in friendly territory, is still discussed. There are also instructions on moving the camp.

=== Chapter XII – On Military Preparation ===
This is about the importance of setting up the army before the battle and its consequences throughout the battle. It cites some advice on which formation is suitable for battle and which ones are less so, the importance that the leader's orders must be understood and transmitted to the different parts of the troop, the great importance of keeping a force in reserve in case of unforeseen circumstances. It describes many training scenarios according to various needs, but also the entire process leading to the placement decisions of the troops: evaluations of enemy forces, taking into account the terrain, adaptation of the formation according to the factors (enemy, terrain, weather, troops and equipment available).

=== Chapter XIII – On the Day before Battle ===
This part of the manual covers the preparations and actions that need to be done a day or two before a battle. We can cite a few:

- Sending a spy towards the enemy in order to prevent a surprise attack and obtain information on their number and equipment.
- Motivate the troops in several possible ways: parade of weak prisoners in front of the soldiers, speeches echoing past and recent glories and try to allay the worries of the soldiers, try to destroy the reputation of the enemy, etc.
- The general must rethink all the factors and possibilities that might arise during the next battle or before: hold counsel (see chapter III).
- Withdraw or fortify the position if the enemy attacks under unfavorable conditions.
- Make provisions for one to two days, in view of the battle.

=== Chapter XIV – On the Day of Battle ===
In this chapter, we state many actions that a good leader must do on the day of the battle, such as: sanctifying his army to God, adapting the tactics according to the terrain or the troops of the adversary (archer, rider, etc. .), etc. We also present several scenarios that can occur during the battle: overcrowding of the enemy, overrun, loss of morale of the troops, etc. As well as several directives concerning the line and the formation of the army during the battle: line not too extended, not too thin, too far apart.

=== Chapter XV – On Besieging a Town ===
This part evokes some instructions or advice and some war machines that can be used during a siege. These tips are grouped into two parts. When besieging, it is important to fortify oneself against the besieged or their allies, to set up a guard for these same reasons, to put troops in front of the gates and posterns, enemies, an attack in multiple places tires out opponents, and it is essential to check whether the enemy's supply routes (living and water) are cut or exploited, etc. After the siege, it is important to treat people gently in order to gain their affection. While as a defender, it is necessary to amass as much food as possible, to expel the useless mouths (women, children and the elderly) from the city, it is necessary to avoid any dissension among the people remaining in the fortress, the gates will be guarded by the most faithful people, etc. Finally, in both cases, the leader must give as much effort as his soldiers to motivate them and give them speeches that support their morale.

=== Chapter XVI – On the Actions after the War is Concluded ===
After a victory, it is described that it is important to give thanks to God for it, to reward those who fought with courage and on the contrary to punish the cowards (as much the soldiers as the officers or a whole body). Loot can be sold, instead of being distributed as a reward, to cover expenses. Prisoners should not be killed, but used as a means of pressure (ransom, etc.) and fallen soldiers should be buried in a grave. While in case of defeat, the army must be invigorated by speeches and punish the enemies if they let their guard down after their victory (in case of victory, remain vigilant towards the enemy). If a truce has been reached, it must be respected, but we must remain on our guard. Finally, one should never refuse an emissary.

=== Chapter XVII – On Surprise Attacks ===
In this chapter, it is about several tactics or methods to bring the good progress of a surprise attack: nocturnal attacks, false abandonment of position, creation of feelings of confidence or superiority in the enemy to then profit from it, etc. . There are also many logistical directives relating to expeditions into enemy territory as well as several instructions on espionage and the estimation of enemy forces.

=== Chapter XVIII – On the Studying of Various Heathen and Roman Formations ===
This chapter deals with the battle formations that the Romans can adopt in attack or defense, as well as those of other peoples and their possible countermeasures. There is a description of strategies, customs, histories and fighting cultures:

- The Persians who are presented as loosely disciplined troops, motivate by spoils and zeal for their false worship.
- The ancient Scythians who influenced the Turks and Bulgarians in their surprise attack tactics.
- The Bulgarian Christians who are presented as the vassals of the empire.
- The Turks are presented as formidable fighter, non-Christian, greedy for money, without words whose author describes in detail their equipment and formations.
- The Franks and Lombards are described as brave Christians, who love war, impatient, easy to corrupt, badly endure long privations and who should be the vassals of the Empire.
- The Slavs are Christians described as indefatigable fighter, being able to undergo long deprivation, but refused the vassalage of the Empire. The author even mentions religious conversions made by the Emperor Basil I .
- The Saracens or Arabs are presented as continual unholy adversaries of the Empire, whose military genius places them above other nations and who should not be overlooked, because they imitate and repeat the tactics of the Romans.

In addition to the many tactics and battle order presented, there are also several speeches by the author on the defense of the Christian faith, here are some of them: “[…] always be ready to shed your blood for the support of the faith Christianity, as well as the defense of the faithful […] ”,“ […], we detest their ungodliness, and make war on them for the support of the faith. "And" The zeal of our soldiers will be animated, when they will know that they are fighting for the faith, [...] and the rest of all Christians”.

=== Chapter XIX – On Naval Warfare ===
This section deals with naval warfare which is described as poorly documented by the author and which was transmitted orally between generals. It describes the specificities that the ships must have, the supplies and the correct positioning of the various crew members as well as their equipment. It especially evokes the Dromon, as the main ship used, but there is also mention of the existence of a larger Dromon which can hold 200 sailors. The author discusses several tactics, formations and naval military strategy that should be used, as well as several precautions to be taken: guarding the ships when the fleet is disembarked to avoid sabotage, etc.

=== Chapter XX – On Various Maxims ===
One evokes in this chapter many councils and maxims being able to serve to perfect the "science of the weapons" of which some come from old authors. We can cite these as an example: "[…] share on all occasions the work and fatigue of war with those you command, […]", "your morals must be a model for others.

=== Epilogue ===
Here the author recalls the most important lessons a general should have learned: the importance of prayer to God and good piety, what a good general should be and knowing how to use the science of war well (tactics, training and adaptation, etc.).
