= Klivanion =

Byzantine piece of armour

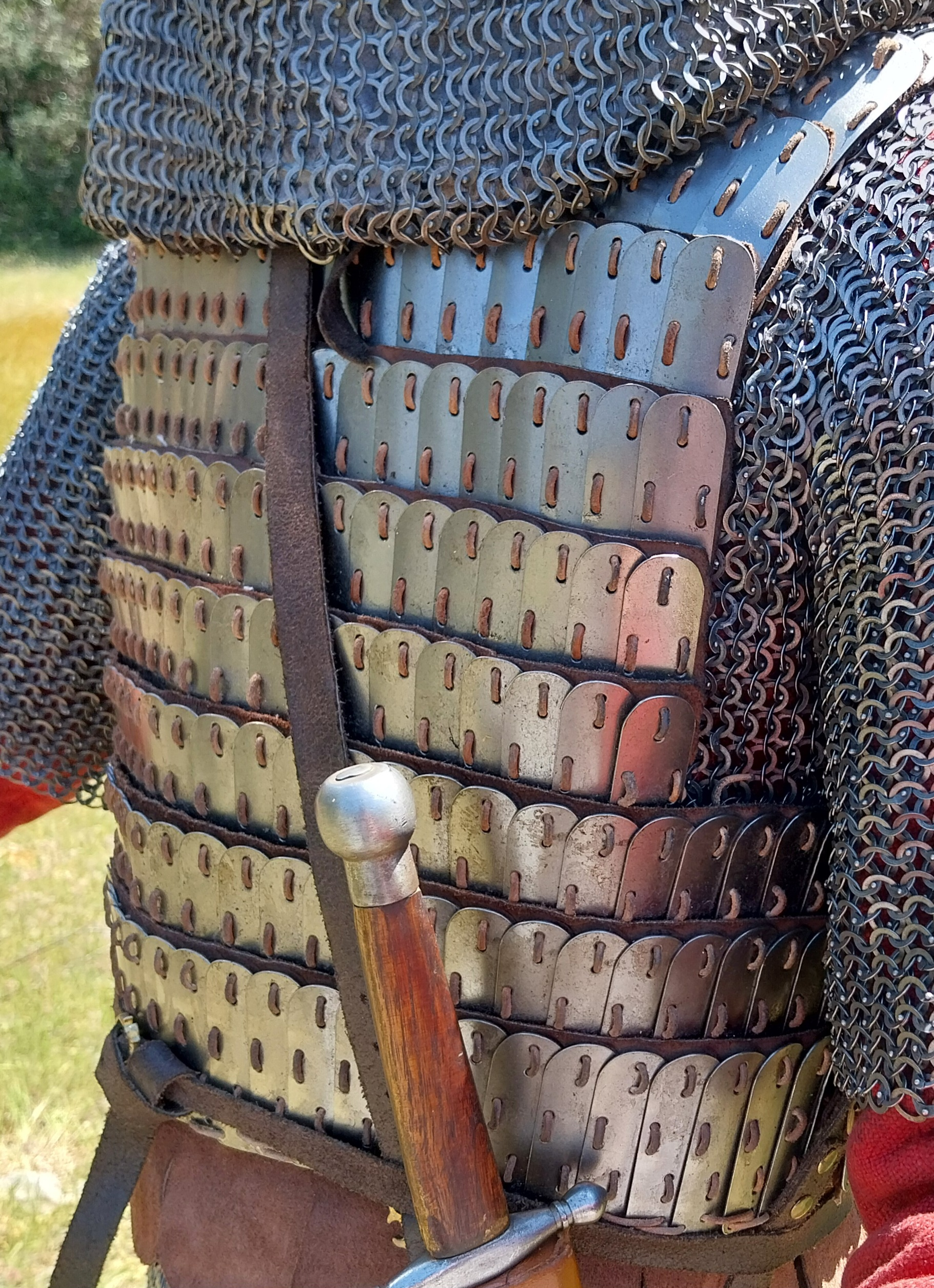
A modern re-construction of a 10th century byzantine lamellar armour (klivanion), made using exact replicas of Veliki Preslav lamellar finds.

The klivanion or klibanion (Greek: κλιβάνιον) was a Byzantine style of lamellar cuirass made of metal plates (lamellae) sewn on a leather backing or with no backing at all, with plates protecting the shoulders and the back. This type of lamellar armour first appears in the late Roman/early Byzantine period (c. 4th-5th Century AD) and seems to have been adopted by the Byzantines from Persian and Eurasian steppe military cultures, presenting an evolution/replacement for the outdated traditional ancient scale armour. The Byzantine army used it continuously up until the mid to late 12th century, and arguably developed a distinct and successful tradition in the lamellar armour technology through those centuries. It was, however, definitely out of use by 1204 and beyond, when it became replaced by new forms of the fast evolving European military technology, and most importantly by coat-of-plates armour. Etymologically, the name derives from the Greek klivanos (κλίβανος), meaning "oven", because of how this cuirass enclosed a man's torso air-tight (like an oven) and it is generally accepted that it would get hot when worn under the summer sun. It was part of the armour of the Byzantine heavy cavalry and heavy infantry as well. The klivanion could also be worn together with a surcoat epilorikion (normally of a single fabric but it is possible it was also occasionally padded) as added covering. Considered one of the best armors together with the zava-lorikion (maille armour), it was worn by thematic tagmata as well as the Byzantine Imperial Guards.

Klivanion armor also existed for horses and was made from bison hide.
