= Sylloge Tacticorum =

Sylloge Tacticorum is thought to have been written in the middle of the tenth century. It is a work on the making of order and organization of military forces (i.e. tactics) and ways to outwit and overcome opponents in the field of battle (i.e. through the use of stratagems).

It contained a description of tactics which would later serve as an influence on the tactical system described in Praecepta Militaria by Nikephoros II Phokas.

The word sylloge means, in Greek, a gathering of information on something.

Heavy infantrymen should have quadrilateral shields narrowing towards the bottom, prescribing the kataphraktoi shield.

Provides additional instruction on religious rituals done prior to battle, and prayers to be recited upon victory.
