= Theodore Alyates =

Theodore Alyates (Greek: Θεόδωρος Ἀλυάτης) was a Byzantine Greek general and close associate of the Emperor Romanos IV Diogenes.

Alyates hailed from Cappadocia and was a close friend of Romanos, who had awarded him the high court title of proedros. At the Battle of Manzikert, he commanded the right wing of the imperial troops, and initially withstood the assault of the Seljuk Turks, but when Andronikos Doukas betrayed Romanοs, the Turks took advantage of the opportunity and routed Alyates' men.

After escaping from that disaster with his Cappadocian units largely intact, Alyates remained loyal to Romanos during the latter's attempt to regain the throne.

In the subsequent civil war between Romanos and Michael VII Doukas, Alyates supported Romanos and joined him with men from Cappadocia and Frankish mercenaries. However, in the crucial Battle of Dokeia, he was defeated, captured and blinded by the Doukas forces, led by the two sons of the Caesar John Doukas.

== Sources ==
- "Theodoros 102". Prosopography of the Byzantine World.
