= Battle of the Zompos Bridge =

1073 battle of the Byzantine-Norman Wars

Battle of Zombos Bridge
- Part of the Byzantine-Norman Wars
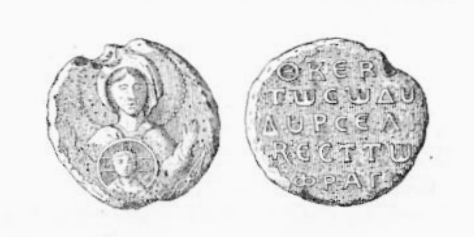
- Seal of the rebellious Italo-Norman mercenary, Roussel de Bailleul
Date	1073 CE
Location	Zombos Bridge was on the Sangarios River, near Amorium, which is in the Anatolian Peninsula
Result	Franco-Norman victory

Belligerents
Rebellious Franco-Norman mercenaries	Byzantine Empire

Commanders and leaders
Roussel de Bailleul	John Doukas; Andronikos Doukas; Nikephoros Botaneiates

Strength
3,000 soldiers, most of whom were knights	12,000 soldiers including: 1,500 Varangian Guard; 500 Frankish Knights

Casualties and losses
A small part of the Franco-Norman army	Many were casualties and prisoners of war, including John Doukas and Andronikos Doukas

The Battle of the Zombos Bridge or Zompos Bridge was fought between the Byzantine Empire and a group of rebellious Norman mercenaries under their Italo-Norman leader, Roussel de Bailleul in the year of 1073, near a bridge on the banks of the Sangarios River. The bridge was in the Phrygia region of Anatolia, near Amorium, the capital of the Anatolic Theme. The decisive defeat of the Byzantine army would further undermine Byzantine authority in Anatolia and Armenia, especially as the defeat came after the shattering defeat by the emerging Seljuk Turks at the Battle of Manzikert. The defeat would allow a power vacuum in Asia Minor, one which the Turks would exploit, with Suleiman ibn Qutalmish, leading a band of Seljuk Turks, conquering vast swathes of the Central Anatolia region, especially its Central Anatolian steppe which was now vulnerable due to the crushing defeat of the Byzantines and allowed for the gradual Turkification of Anatolia.

== Prelude ==
Following the death of the King of the Franks, King of the Lombards, and Emperor of the Carolingian Empire, Charlemagne, the Empire split into many kingdoms ruled by Frankish nobles and the Carolingian dynasty most notably the Kingdom of West Francia, later the Kingdom of France, the Kingdom of Middle Francia, later the Kingdoms of Italy, Provence, and Lotharingia, and finally the Kingdom of East Francia, later the Kingdom of Germany. Due to the many wars of those kingdoms and their successors for Charlemagne's legacy, inheritance, and empire, it left a power vacuum for others to exploit. Magyar horsemen and raiders from the steppe raided into Germany, Italy, and as west as into France while Arab pirates and cosairs from North Africa raided coastal cities in the Mediterranean Sea like Rome and captured cities like Taranto and islands like Sicily and Malta. Most notably however were the Vikings who raided France. One Viking leader was Rollo, who had besieged Paris but in 911 entered vassalage to the king of the West Franks, Charles the Simple, through the Treaty of Saint-Clair-sur-Epte. In exchange for his homage and fealty, Rollo legally gained the territory that he and his Viking allies had previously conquered.

Following the establishment of the Duchy of Normandy, the Normans quickly assimilated to the local French culture, speaking the French language, intermixing with the French, becoming Christian, establishing feudalism, and becoming professional French knights. With such a small territory, but having a growing population, the many lords of the duchy often fought with each other for control of more fiefs, increasing the military experience of the Normans. Before long, due to the growing population, there were more lords than there were land to conquer. This caused many Normans to leave the small duchy to many foreign lands, seeking loot, land, and glory in the new places. This caused many Normans to setoff for Southern Italy. Taking advantage of the disunity of the region, these hardy Franco-Norsemen, with their martial prowess, conquered many lands, loot, and glory from the many peoples of it, like the Lombards of Benevento, Salerno, and Capua, the Byzantine Catepanate of Italy, and the Kalbids, a dynasty of Muslim Sicily. One of these Normans was a man named Roussel de Bailleul.

Roussel de Bailleul, also known as Phrangopoulos (Greek: Φραγγόπουλος, lit. 'son-of-a-Frank') was a Norman adventurer, whom Anna Comnena in her Alexiad, the main source of his biography, called Ourselios (Οὐρσέλιος), also rendered as Urselius. Roussel ventured with the Apulian Normans to Italy, settled in Terra d'Otranto and served under Roger de Hauteville in Sicily. As mentioned before, following the dissolution of the Carolingian Empire, Arab pirates raided and conquered Southern Italy, and such raids led them to conquer Sicily and the Norman invasion was supported by Pope Nicholas II who wanted to re-take Sicily for Christianity. During the Conquest of Sicily, according to Geoffrey Malaterra, Roussel distinguished himself with his bravery at the Battle of Cerami, where he urged Count Roger to pursue the fleeing Arabs. Following Roussel's glorious achievements in Sicily and Southern Italy, the Norman adventurer, either in search of more glory and plunder or in exile, came to the Byzantine Empire where he became a mercenary for the Byzantine army.

The Eastern Roman Empire, later known as the Byzantine Empire, was in a crisis. In 1025, the Eastern Roman Empire was experiencing a golden age under emperor Basil II the Bulgarslayer. During Basil's reign, he conquered the First Bulgarian Empire, took lands in the Levant from the Fatimid Caliphate and from the Kingdom of Georgia, while his many generals launched other campaigns against the Khazars and Lombards. He left a powerful army and a massive treasury for his successors, and when he died in 1025, the Eastern Roman Empire was feared throughout Europe and the Middle East, being the most powerful nation of that time. However, corrupt bureaucrats, weak and spoiled emperors, civil war, rebellions, court intrigue, and military defeats like Romanos III Argyros's humiliating defeat against his own client state, Mirdasid Aleppo at the Battle of Azaz (1030) declined the once powerful state. Defeats like these killed many veterans and experienced soldiers of Basil II's campaigns, and helped the Byzantine state's decline. However, this didn't stop the Byzantines from conquering the Armenian Kingdom of Ani.

Before the expansion of the Byzantine Empire under the Macedonian dynasty, Bulgaria and Armenia served as buffers against nomad raids. However, with the Byzantine conquest of Bulgaria, the Pechenegs, who had previously invaded Bulgaria, now raided the empire from the Eurasian Steppe across the Danube, culminating in a series of disasters where the Pechenegs plundered the Balkans until 1053 while defeating several Byzantine armies, something which historian Anthony Kaldellis called "the worst string of Roman defeats in more than a century." Meanwhile, the conquest of Ani in Armenia by Constantine IX Monomachos immediately led to conflict with the nomadic Great Seljuk Empire under Alp Arslan from the East. After a few years of back and forth raiding, the Byzantines, under Emperor Romanos IV Diogenes, faced the Seljuks under Alp Arslan, during the 1071 Battle of Manzikert, one of the greatest and decisive battles of Medieval Europe. Roussel was there during the campaign of Manzikert where he led a contingent of 500 Frankish and Norman knights. However, they did not participate in the disastor, as they were dispatched by the Emperor Romanos to Chliat to forage and plunder. The Byzantines lost the Battle of Manzikert with 6,000 to 12,000 soldiers killed and they lost complete control of Anatolia to the Seljuks. The Seljuks would constantly raid and pillage the region for the next few years with Byzantine authorities having no control over the province.

The constant raiding by the Turks roused the Byzantine government, under the new emperor Michael VII Doukas, into action against the Turks. A new army under Isaac Komnenos was amassed with Issac being accompanied by his younger brother, Alexios Komnenos and a group of 400 Franco-Norman knights under Roussel. Unfortunately Issac and Roussel got into an argument leading to Roussel deserting the Byzantine army with his western mercenaries. Issac considered sending some troops under Alexios to hunt Roussel down from his base in Caesarea when he learned that a sizeable Seljuk force was on its way to attack him. Issac moved out into Cappadocia leaving Alexios in camp. In the ensuing engagement Issac was defeated and was captured with Alexios barely managing to escape with his life. The battle broke the Byzantine power in Anatolia, helping Roussel following the example set by his fellow Normans in the Mezzogiorno. In 1073, Roussel captured territory in the Anatolian regions of Galatia and Lycaonia where he founded a principality with himself as prince. Roussel based his new powerbase around Ancyra, which is now modern-day Ankara, the capital of Turkey.

== Battle ==
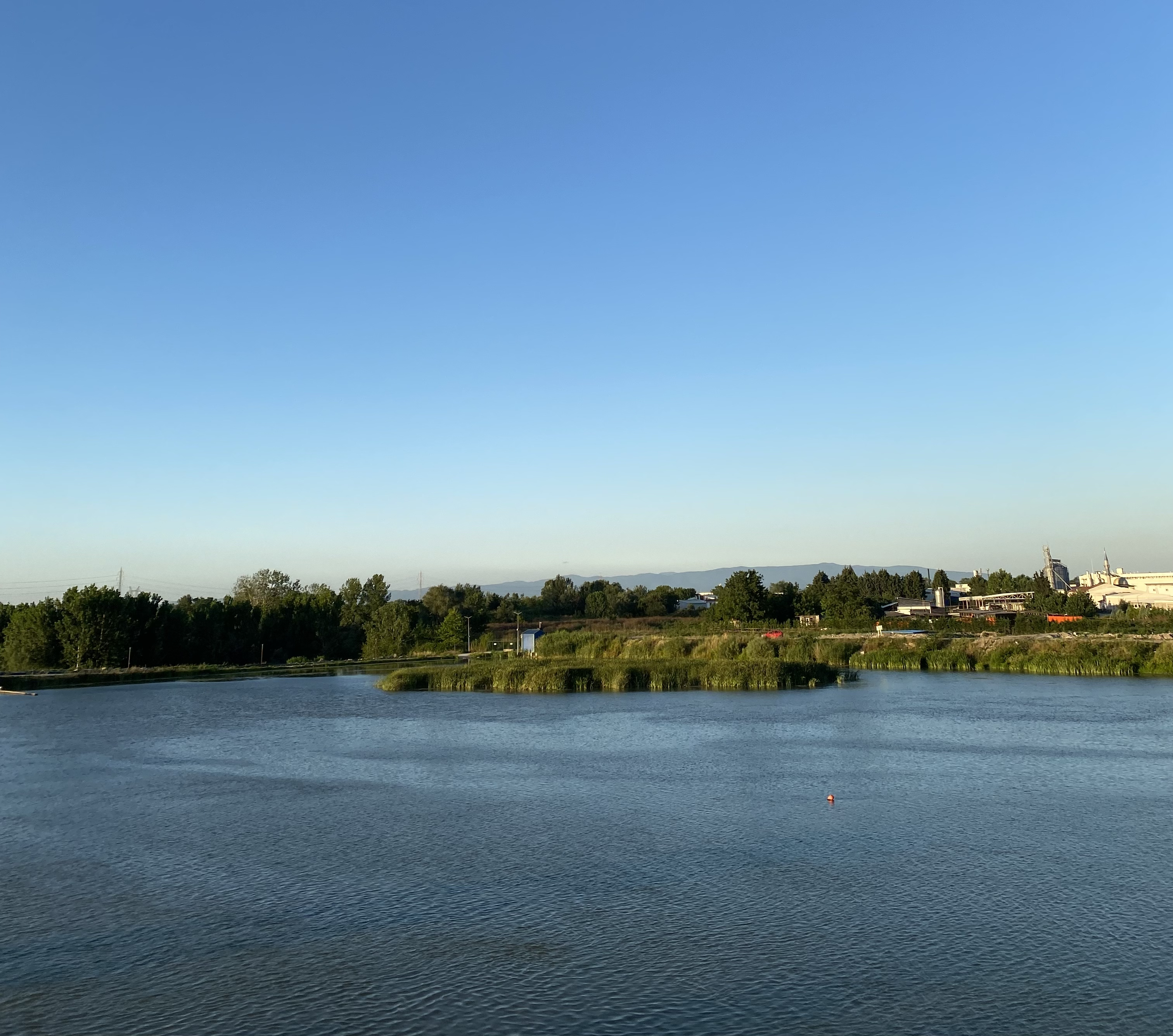
The Sangarios River over which was Zombos Bridge.

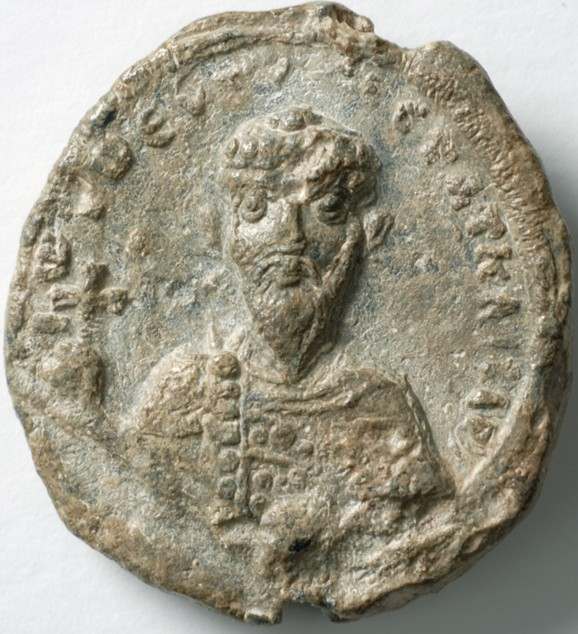
John Doukas, Caesar, the leader of the Byzantine army and who later attempted to usurp power from the emperor with help from Roussel.

In order to subdue Roussel, the Byzantine court sent an army under the Emperor's uncle, caesar John Doukas. The army was also joined by John Doukas's son, Andronikos Doukas and the governor of the Anatolic Theme, Nikephoros Botaneiates. Fixing his headquarters at Dorylaeum, the two armies faced off with Zompos bridge between them, a bridge over the Sangarios River, one of the great lines of communication between Constantinople and the central provinces in Asia Minor. Nikephoros warned John not to cross the Zompos Bridge and engage the forces of Roussel, but rather wait for reinforcements from nearby towns and cities. However, John disregarded his advice by crossing the river, pinning his army between Roussel's army and the Sangarios River. His choice was a gamble, if his men did not win the battle, they would face the risk of being trapped into the river by the Normans which would lead to their certain destruction.

The Byzantine right consisted of Frankish knights, the center consisted of Varangian Guard under John Doukas, while the left flank was under Andronikos. Meanwhile, Nikephoros led the reserve in the rear with infantry levies from the Asiatic Greeks of the nearby cities. Prior to the battle, Roussel had managed to convince the Frankish mercenaries on the Byzantine side to defect and join his cause as both of sides shared the same French nationality. When the battle started, the Frankish mercenaries turned against the Byzantines leading to John Doukas and his son being attacked on one side by the Frankish mercenaries and on the other by Roussel's host. Problems were made worse when Nikephoros, who commanded the rearguard, held his troops back from fighting in the battle and retreated. Modern historians have debated exactly why he chose to withhold his troops and whether they could have turned the tide of the battle. Nikephoros's shameful retreat of the Asiatic reserves left John and his son Andronikos alone and surrounded by the Franco-Normans eventually leading to the Byzantines being defeated. After he lost, John was captured together with his son Andronikos. Meanwhile, Nikephoros gathered the survivors and led them with his troops back to his estates in the Anatolic Theme. Ironically, two years earlier, Andronikos had retreated from the battle with the reserves, leaving Emperor Romanos to his fate at Manzikert and now Nikephoros had done the same thing to him and his father. Whatever the case, Roussel had solidified his new domain as he had won the Battle of the Zompos Bridge.

== Aftermath ==
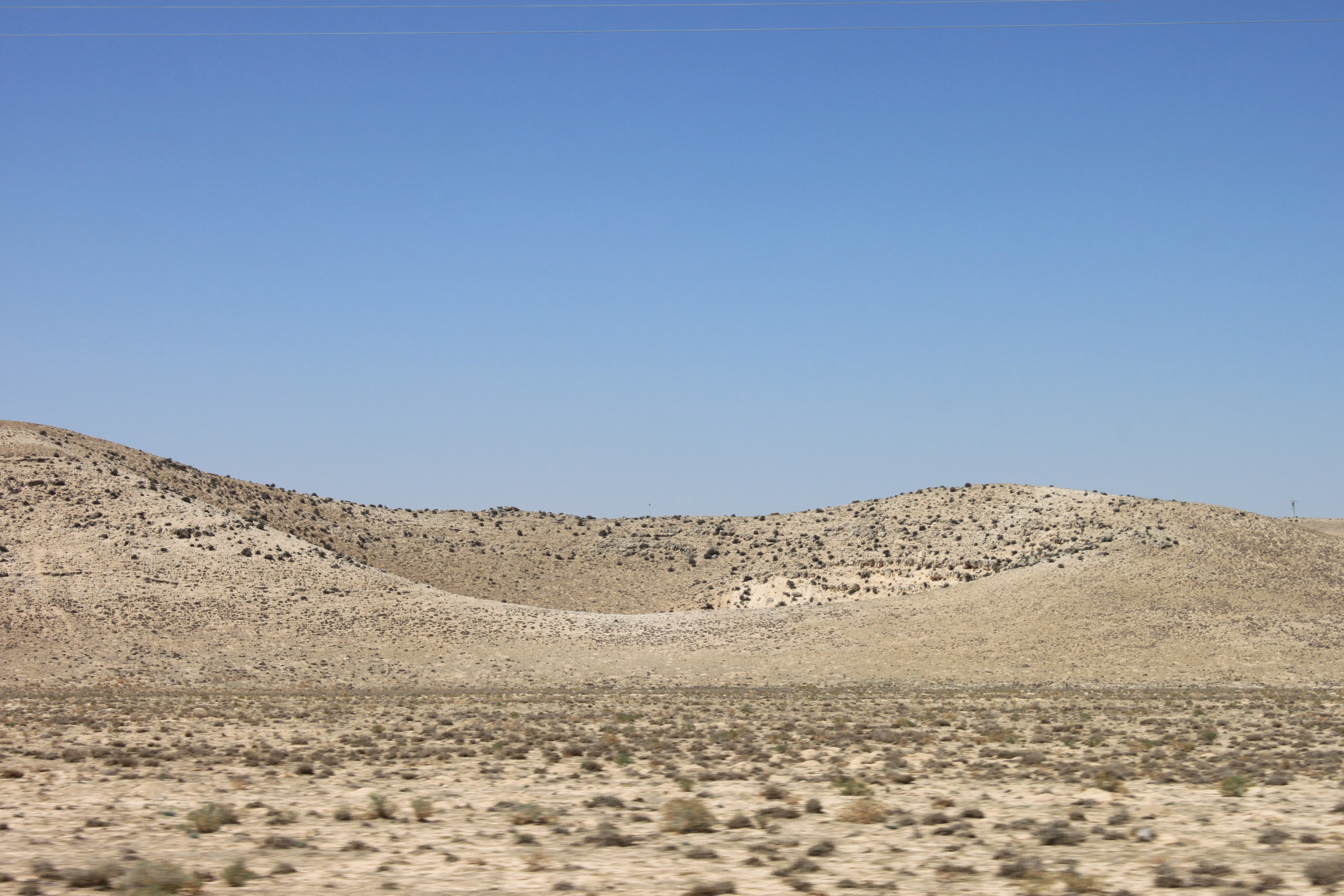
The Central Anatolian steppe where the Seljuks of Rum thrived in

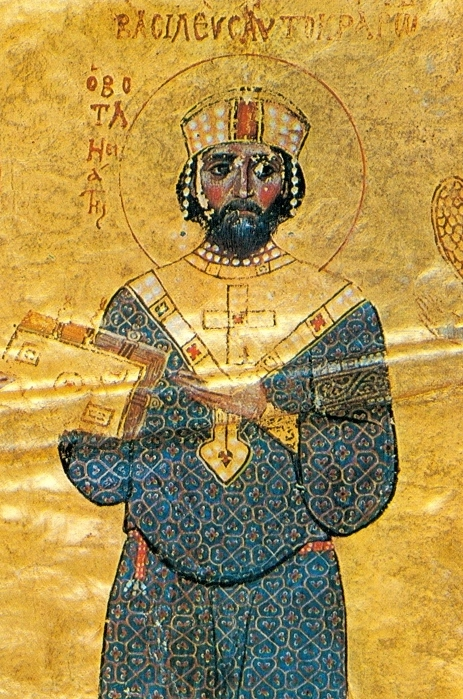
Nikephoros Botaneiates, leader of the Anatolian rear at Zombos Bridge and later emperor who came to power with help from the Turks

The victorious mercenaries then proceeded to advance to the shores of the Bosporus, while a relieving force under John's younger son Constantine Doukas was formed. However it disintegrated when its commander suddenly died. Roussel, unsure if his mercenary force could overthrow the emperor at Constantinople, took advantage of the confusion and fear in Constantinople, and proclaimed John Doukas emperor, easily persuading his prisoner to assume the title and dethrone his ungrateful nephew, and they continued on their way to Constantinople. This also helped Roussel to gain more backing from the local Byzantine Greek population of Galatia and Lycaonia and to attract more recruits. Roussel advanced toward the capital and he sacked Chrysopolis, just opposite Constantinople, in the Asian side of the Bosporus.

Michael VII was deeply concerned about his own safety. Michael VII reacted in panic and tried on one hand to appease Roussel by promising him titles and releasing his wife and children who had been hostages in Constantinople while he formed an alliance with Suleiman ibn Qutulmish a Seljuk warlord in Anatolia. In 1072, Alp Arslan had died, and the Seljuk Empire was inherited by Malik-Shah I. Malik-Shah was a weak ruler so a Seljuk noble, Suleiman ibn Qutulmish, managed to lead a group of Seljuk Turks into the Central Anatolian steppe, where they formed the Sultanate of Rum outside Malik-Shah's authority. The Oghuz Turks and Turkmens in Central Anatolia thrived, as the steppe and pastureland in this area was similar to the steppe of Central Asia. They formed a new society in Anatolia, raiding Byzantine lands, but also trading and intermarrying with the local Byzantine Greeks, starting the Turkification of Anatolia and forming the modern Turkish people. Michael was able to conclude a formal treaty with the emerging Oghuz Turkic state, whereby Michael gave to Suleiman the government of the provinces of which the Seljuk Turks were in possession of. The Turks agreed to provide an army to fight on Michael's behalf, and this army moved quickly to Mount Sophon where John Doukas and Roussel were encamped. The mercenaries were ambushed and Roussel and John were captured.

However, instead of delivering the prisoners to the Byzantines, the Turks got paid a ransom by Roussel's wife for her husband and Roussel returned to his lands. He continued to expand his control over lands in the former Armeniakon theme and also gained control over urban centres such as Amasea and Neocaesarea. It seems that Roussel was able to collect tax revenues, strengthen his military power through military fortresses and making deals with local elites in return for providing protection against the invading Turkmen, which helped him gain more popularity among the local Byzantine Greeks, who feared the Turks. In a time where the imperial authority in Anatolia was crumbling, the relative security of Roussel's domain was a challenge to the court in Constantinople.

The regions of Anatolia

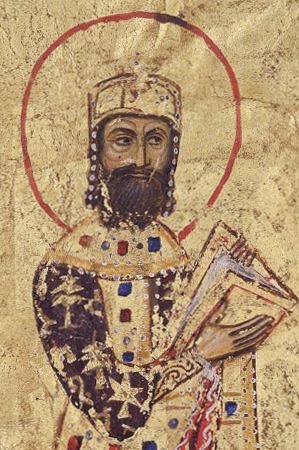
The future emperor Alexios Komnenos, who ended Roussel's rebellion

Finally in 1075, Michael put the young twenty-year old general Alexios Komnenos in charge of putting down the rebellion. Unfortunately he was given very little funds and a small army. Alexios Komnenos appealed to Suleiman ibn Qutulmish, and asked them to capture John and Roussel once more for a ransom. Suleiman captured Roussel by inviting him to a feast, and then captured him. Roussel was then brought to the city of Amasea. Roussel's popularity with the locals was so strong that Alexios Komnenos blindfolded Roussel and lied to the populace that he was blind and the desperate locals gathered together funds and gave it to Alexios. Alexios used the funds and gave it to the Seljuks. In the end, Roussel's rebellion only quickened the Turkification of Anatolia, as his domains in Galatia, Lycaonia, Cappadocia, and Phrygia effectively fell into Seljuk control. The Seljuks would once again take advantage of civil war in the Byzantine Empire during Michael VII's reign when Nikephoros III Botaneiates, governor of the Anatolic theme, allied with the Seljuks against Michael. Botaneiates conquered all of Western Anatolia, including the ancient Greek regions of Lydia, Caria, Lycia, Pisidia, Pamphylia, Aeolis, Ionia, and Doris. He let his Seljuk allies garrison the lands under his control with the assumption that they'll leave when he asked them to. However his assumption was incorrect and as Botaneiates became emperor, all those regions came under Seljuk control. Finally, during Nikephoros III Botaneiates's reign, Nikephoros Melissenos, another noble in Anatolia, launched a rebellion against imperial authority, and he allied with the Seljuks. Nikephoros Melissenos, like Botaneiates, used Seljuks as garrisons for the cities he captured from imperial control, and when Botaneiates captured the regions of Bithynia, Mysia, and the legendary Troad, they fell under Seljuk control. One of the cities captured was Nicaea, which fell under the control of Suleiman. Although his rebellion failed, in the end, Suleiman ibn Qutulmish had total control of Asia Minor except for some coastal cities like Nicomedia, Trebizond, Sinope, and Amastris and some coastal Anatolian regions like Paphlagonia and Pontus. Suleiman established his capital in the ancient Greek city of Nicaea in 1077, cementing Turkish control of Asia Minor.

In 1077, Roussel was ransomed from his imprisonment in Constantinople to lead a battalion against Nikephoros Bryennios the Elder during Bryennios's rebellion against Michael and then Nikephoros Botaneiates. Roussel garrisoned in Perinthus and he was joined there by Nikephoritzes (Michael's advisor during his reign), after the fall of Michael VII. Roussel died suddenly and Nikephoritzes was accused of having poisoned him.

== Sources ==
- Comnena, Anna (1928) [c. 1148]. The Alexiad . Translated by Elizabeth A. S. Dawes – via Wikisource.
- Attaleiates, Michael (2012). The History. Dumbarton Oaks Medieval Library. Translated by Kaldellis, Anthony; Krallis, Dimitris. Cambridge, Massachusetts: Harvard University Press. ISBN 978-0-674-05799-9.
- Beihammer, Alexander Daniel (2017). Byzantium and the Emergence of Muslim-Turkish Anatolia, Ca. 1040-1130. Taylor & Francis. ISBN 978-1351983860.
- Finlay, George (1854). History of the Byzantine and Greek Empires from MLVII to MCCCCLIII. Vol. II. William Blackwood and Sons.
- Haldon, John (2001). The Byzantine Wars. Stroud, Gloucestershire: Tempus. ISBN 978-0-7524-1795-0.
- Maynard, Daniel R. F. (20 June 2018). "Nikephoros III Botaniates (A.D. 1078–1081)". De Imperatoribus Romanis. Archived from the original on 3 August 2019.
- Norwich, John Julius (1993). Byzantium: The Apogee. London: Penguin. ISBN 0-14-011448-3.
- Norwich, John J. (1995). Byzantium: The Decline and Fall. Alfred A. Knopf, Inc. ISBN 978-0-679-41650-0.
- Zakkar, Suhayl (1971). The Emirate of Aleppo: 1004–1094. Beirut: Dar al-Amanah. OCLC 759803726.
