= Sieges of Berkri (1034–1035) =

Conflict between the Byzantines and Muslim emirates

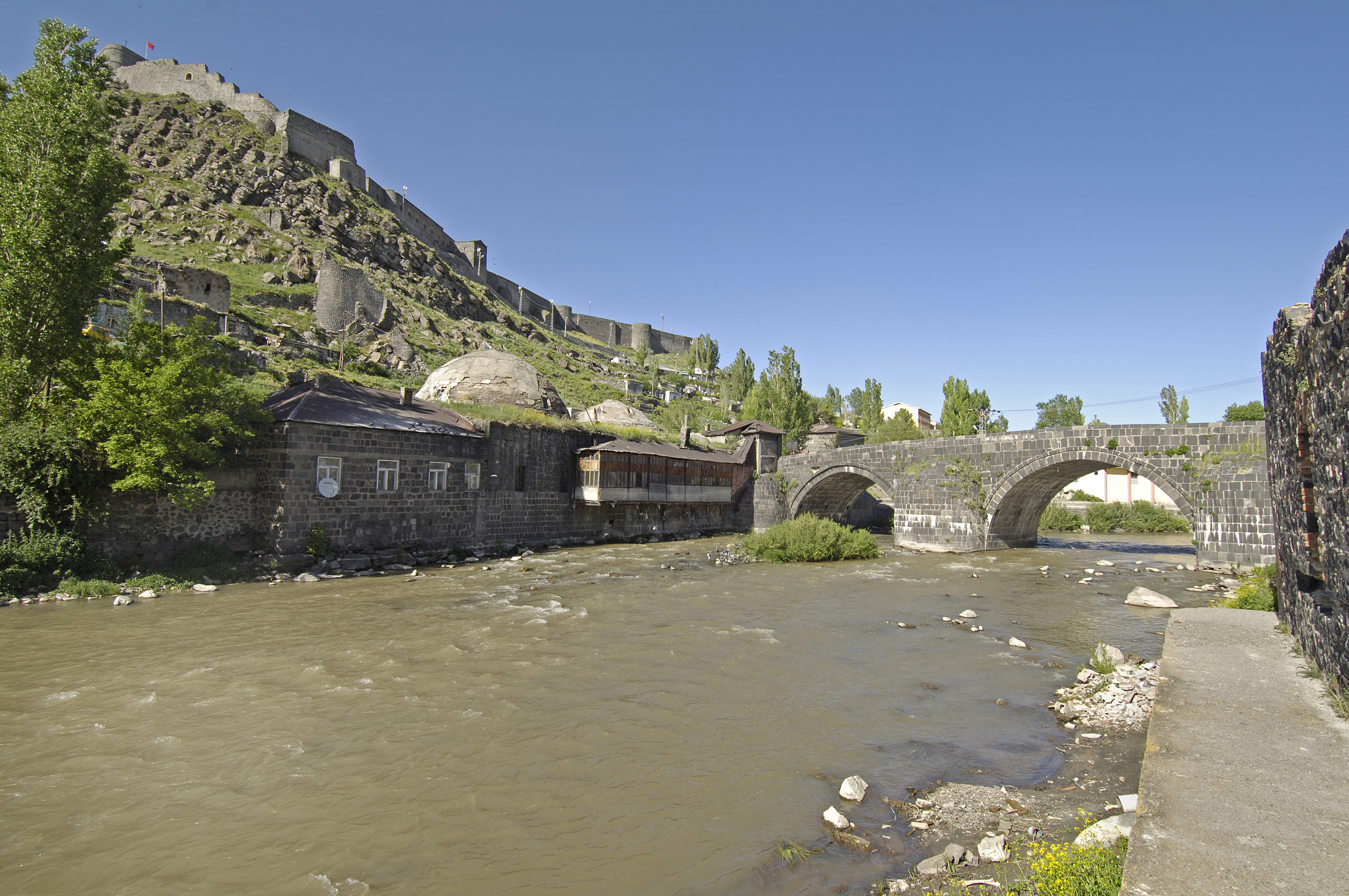
- Modern view of the fortifications and waterworks at Muradiye
Date	1034–1035
Location	Berkri, modern Muradiye, Van Province
Result	Byzantine victory Full results: First siege: Victory for Alim; Second siege: Byzantine victory
Territorial changes	Byzantine loss and recapture of Berkri

Belligerents
Byzantine Empire: Varangian Guard	Emirate of Berkri; Rawwadid dynasty Turkomans; Supported by: Fatimid Caliphate

Commanders and leaders
First Siege: Nicholas Chryselios †; Second Siege: Niketas Pegonites; Harald Sigurdsson	Alim †

Strength
First Siege: 6,000	Large

Casualties and losses
First Siege: 6,000 (Note: John Skylitzes records the figure of 6,000 Byzantine troops slain when Berkri was lost. Aristakes Lastivertsi gives a much higher figure of 24,000 killed.)	Very heavy

The sieges of Berkri were military engagements fought between the Byzantine Empire and the forces of Emir Alim in 1034 and 1035. Having initially submitted Berkri to Byzantium in 1033, Alim broke off relations with the empire following a diplomatic clash, and brokered alliances with neighbouring Muslim peoples to reoccupy Berkri. In 1034, Alim and his allies conducted a successful attack against the Byzantine garrison and captured the settlement, exposing Byzantine Armenia to raiding attacks. However, the Byzantines soon organised a retaliatory expedition which arrived in Vaspurakan in late 1034. After a series of engagements, Alim was defeated and killed in Berkri following a lengthy siege, with the Byzantines retaking the settlement in early 1035.

== Background ==
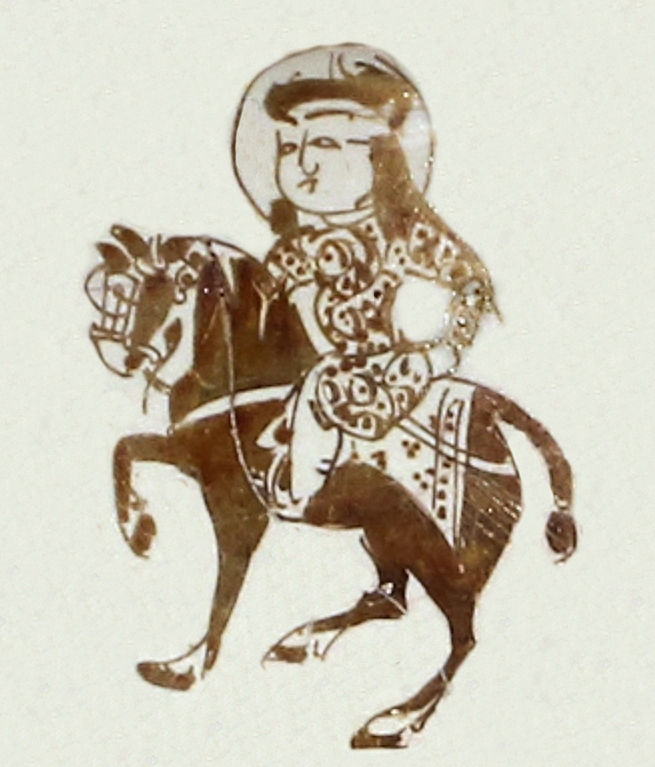
Depiction of a Turkoman horserider

During the early 11th century, between 1019 and 1021, Byzantium had expanded its reach into Transcaucasia with the surrender of Senekʿerim Artsruni of Vaspurakan and his realm to Emperor Basil II, as Senek'erim had struggled to protect his province from neighbouring Arab and Turkoman raiders. However, maintaining control over the region proved challenging, with the governor Basil Argyros failing to consolidate Byzantine hold over the province. Although Argyros' successor, Nikephoros Komnenos, saw more success in checking attacks of Saracen powers around Lake Van and in subduing neighbouring enemies, parts of Vaspurakan, such as Archesh and Berkri, remained under Muslim control at the time of Komnenos' recall in 1026. Berkri would not pass into Byzantine hands until 1033, when the local Emir Alim (of Turkoman origins) had submitted the town to the Byzantines under conditions, and had dispatched his son to visit Emperor Romanos III. However, as Romanos was ill at the time, Alim's son was refused an audience and returned to the east in anger. Following this perceived affront, the emir's son persuaded his father to retake the city. To achieve this, Alim entered an accord with the neighbouring Muslim powers, dispatching invitations to the Fatimid Caliphate and the Rawwadids to help him drive the Byzantines out of Berkri.

== Sieges ==
=== First siege of Berkri ===
Alim's pleas for aid were successful, and in 1034 he was joined by a large number of Rawwadid, Iranian and Turkoman forces, as well as possible contingents from Fatimid territories. The situation was opportune, as the main Byzantine army of Vaspurakan under Kawasilas had departed the city of Berkri to head to Archesh. Although a 6,000-strong detachment was left to garrison Berkri under the Bulgarian Nicholas Chryselios, the discipline of these troops laxed and the men frequently became inebriated from their consumption of wine. Alim led his army against the Byzantines and conducted a surprise attack by night, catching Chryselios' men unprepared. Alim retook the city and slaughtered the entire garrison. According to Aristakes Lastivertsi, Alim ordered a ditch be dug as deep as a man is tall, and that the corpses of the Byzantine soldiers by pushed into the ditch until it was full. Alim maintained a large garrison in his newly restored city of Berkri, while the remainder of his allies departed to their homeland with great quantities of booty taken from the fortress, though they soon returned to exploit their victory with further raids into Vaspurakan.

=== Niketas Pegonites' Campaign and second siege of Berkri ===
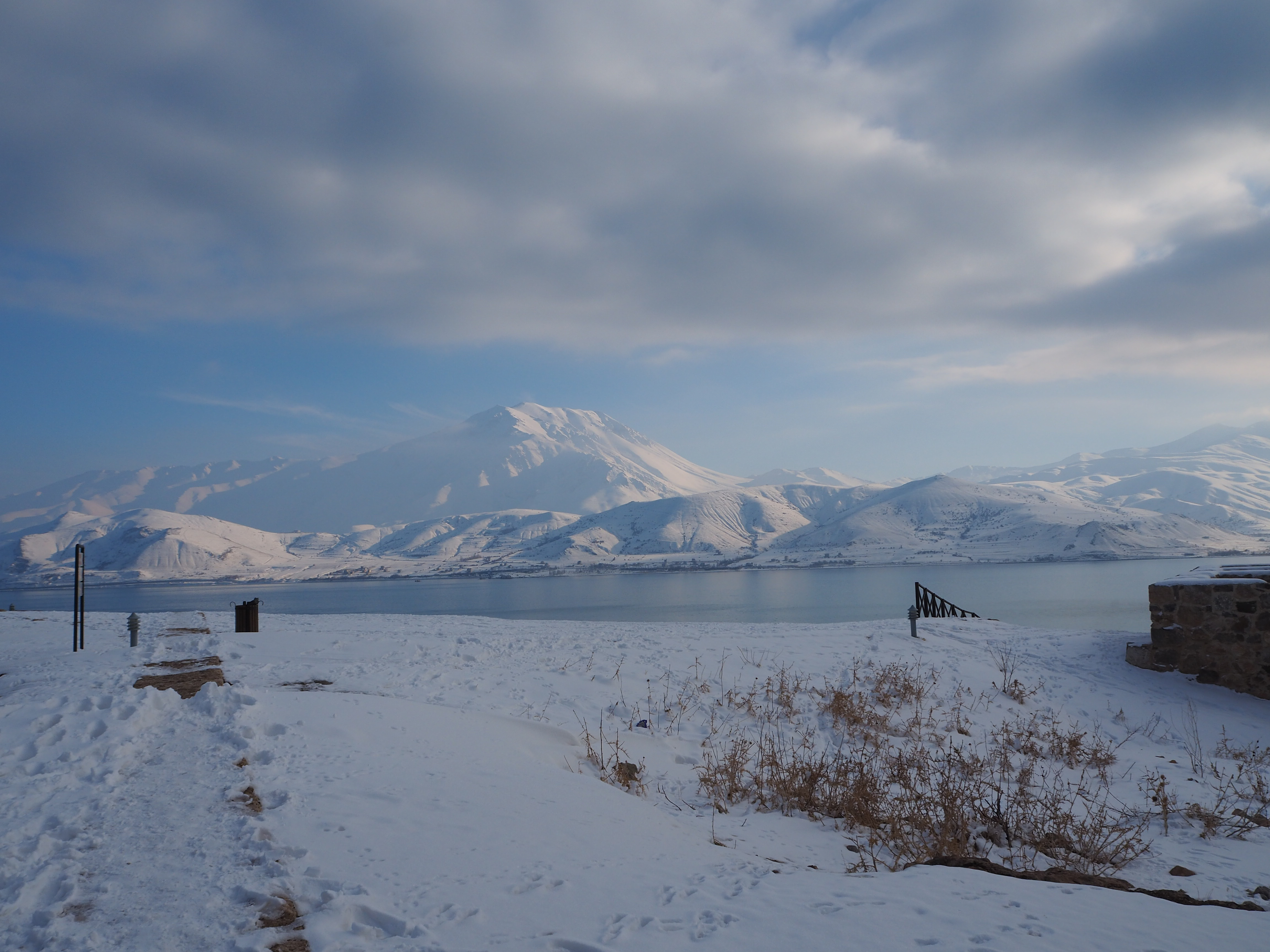
Lake Van and surrounding territories in the winter

Alim's victory over the Byzantines at Berkri opened Vaspurakan to renewed attacks from the Muslim powers, creating an urgent strategic vulnerability that demanded an immediate response from the new Emperor Michael IV. By late 1034, the emperor had assembled a powerful army that included elements of the Varangian Guard under the exiled Norwegian prince Harald Sigurdsson. The overall commander of this army was Niketas Pegonites, veteran of Basil II's Bulgarian campaigns, whom Michael appointed as governor of Vaspurakan and tasked with stabilizing the strategic situation with retaliatory attacks against the neighbouring Muslim powers, as well as the recapture of Berkri. Arriving in Vaspurakan, Pegonites and Sigurdsson defeated the Arab, Iranian and Turkoman columns they encountered and attacked enemy territory, capturing a large number of fortresses. The Varangians played a significant role in the successes achieved during this winter campaign. (Note: The 13th century Icelandic chronicler Snorri Sturluson claims that as many as 80 towns and fortresses fell to the Byzantines.)

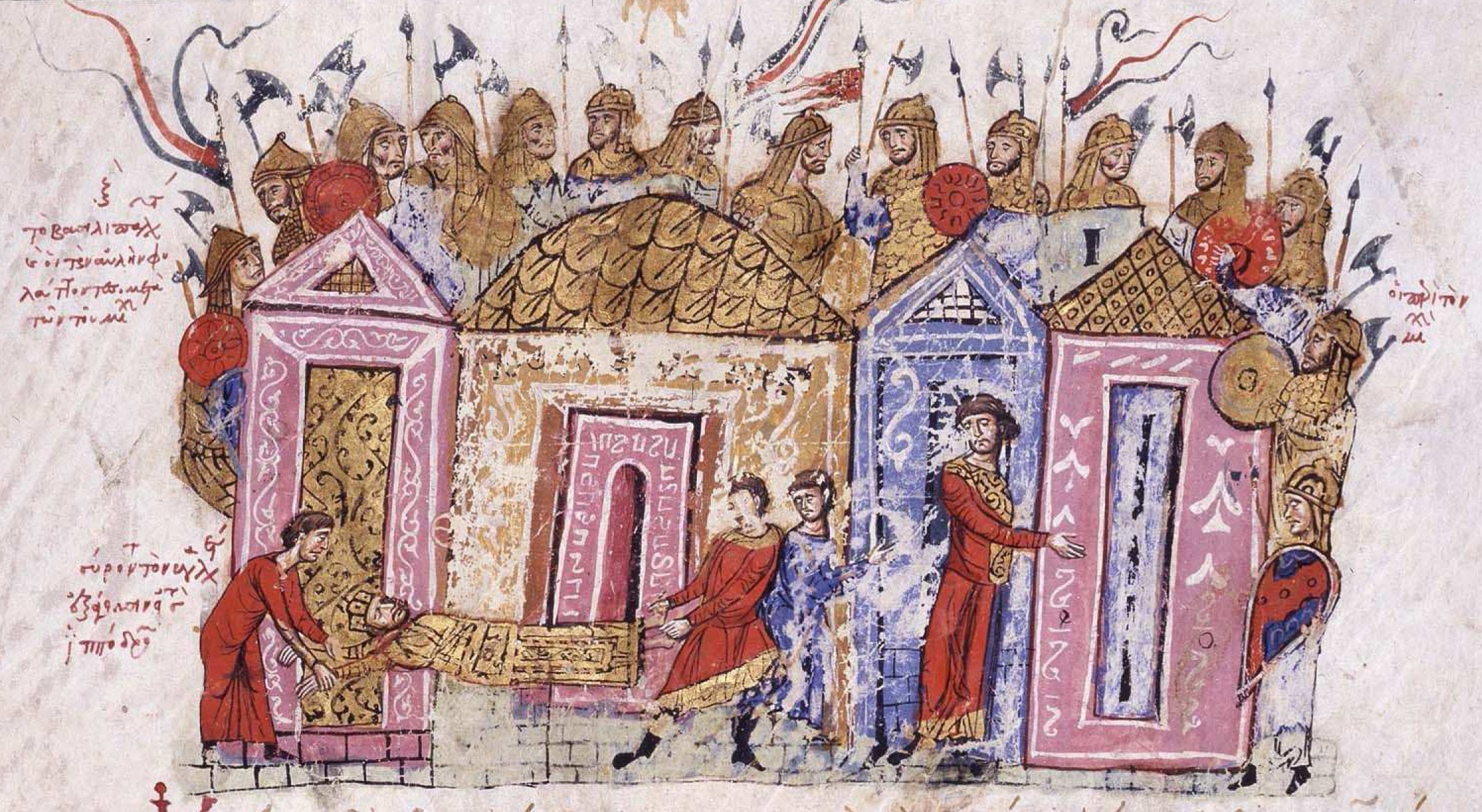
Varangian guardsmen as depicted in an illuminated manuscript from the Skylitzes Synopsis

Having secured Vaspurakan, Pegonites advanced against Alim in Berkri and invested the town in a siege. The Byzantines assembled battering rams and drills covered in fire-resistant hides, as well as artillery pieces, such as mangonels, trebuchets and bolt throwers. Additionally, Pegonites' men began tunnelling operations to undermine the fortifications of Berkri. The modern historian Don Hollway suggests that the heavily armoured Varangians may have conducted a parade before the walls in order to intimidate and demoralize the defenders, adhering to a psychological stratagem described in the Taktika of Leo VI, though use of such methods in this instance is speculative. In early 1035, the Byzantines breached the fortifications of Berkri, after which the Varangians led an assault to storm the town. In the fighting which followed, the Byzantines took the lower town and killed most of the emir's forces. Alim and his son both died in the fighting. The remaining defenders fled to the citadel, but soon dispatched a plea of surrender to the Byzantines, which Pegonites granted. Having restored control over Berkri, the Byzantines expelled the surviving Muslim population and occupied the fortress.

== Aftermath ==
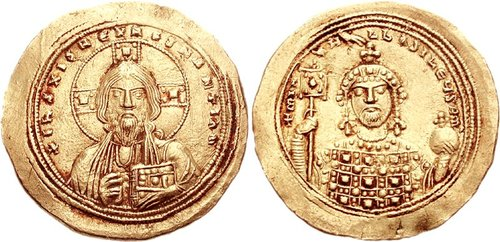
Histamenon depicting Emperor Michael IV the Paphlagonian

The successful campaign of Niketas Pegonites and the recapture of Berkri secured the Byzantine position in Vaspurakan for the immediate future, as the plain between lake Van and Agri Dagi was largely closed to invaders from the direction of Transcaucasia and the Iranian plateau by a chain of fortresses. In 1035, the Byzantines also made a territorial gain further north, when Alde, the wife of George of Abasgia, surrendered the fortress of Anakopia. The fortress guarded the passage between the Black Sea and the Caucasus mountains, thus providing the empire direct access to Abkhazia. However, the military situation further south in Mesopotamia remained precarious for the Byzantines, as a Numayrid Arab raid devastated Byzantine territory along the Euphrates and captured the lower town of Edessa, almost capturing the citadel before the arrival of a Byzantine army under Constantine, doux of Antioch, compelled them to withdraw without a battle. On the other hand, tensions between the Byzantine Empire and the Fatimid Caliphate cooled with the death of Caliph al-Zahir li-I'zaz Din Allah in June 1036, as the Fatimids became preoccupied with developments in their western provinces. Consequently, Michael IV was able to recall some forces, including those of George Maniakes and Harald Sigurdsson's Varangians, from the eastern frontier to Constantinople.

== Bibliography ==
- Kaldellis, Anthony (2017). Streams of Gold, Rivers of Blood: The Rise and Fall of Byzantium, 955 A.D. to the First Crusade. Oxford University Press. ISBN 978-0190253226.
- Wortley, John, ed. (2010). John Skylitzes: A Synopsis of Byzantine History, 811–1057. Cambridge: Cambridge University Press. ISBN 978-0-521-76705-7.
- Aristakēs Lastiverttsʻi (1963). Yuzbashyan, Karen (ed.). Patmutʻiwn Aristakisi Lastiverttsʻwoy (in Armenian). Yerevan: Haykakan SSṚ Gitutʻyunneri akademiayi hratarakchʻutʻyun. (English translation: Aristakes Lastivertc'i's History (PDF). Translated by Bedrosian, Robert. New York: Sources of the Armenian Tradition. 1985.)
- Hollway, Don (2021). The Last Viking. Bloomsbury. p. 157. ISBN 9781472846518.
