= Battle of Caesarea (1073) =

Battle between Turks and Byzantine forces

- Part of the Byzantine–Seljuk wars
| Date | 1073 |
| Location | Caesarea |
| Result | Seljuk victory |

Belligerents
| Byzantine Empire | Seljuk Turks |

Commanders and leaders
| Isaac Komnenos (POW); Alexios Komnenos | Unknown |

Strength
| Unknown | Unknown |

Casualties and losses
| Unknown | Unknown |

The Battle of Caesarea occurred in 1073 when the Seljuk Turks defeated a Byzantine force near Caesarea who were led by Isaac Komnenos and his brother, Alexios. Isaac was captured during the battle.

== Background ==
After the battle of Manzikert, the new emperor, Michael VII Doukas, had appointed a new Domestikos in 1073, Isaac Komnenos along his brother, Alexios, and Roussel de Bailleul, to deal with the Seljuk invasion who were infesting Anatolia. Roussel, a second in command, had a mercenary force of 400 Frankish men. While the Byzantine army marching to meet the Seljuks, soon an argument between Isaac and Roussel flared up, leading to Roussel abandoning the Byzantine camp with his men. The Byzantine had already arrived in Kayseri where the Seljuk army was approaching.

== Battle ==
Upon learning of the 400 Franks' flight, Isaac briefly considered dispatching a troop under the command of his brother Alexios to hunt them down. However, word soon spread that a Seljuk force was on its way. Isaac traveled to the Cappadocian frontier to meet the Seljuks, leaving Alexios in charge of a small guard to watch over the Byzantine camp.

Isaac attacked the Seljuks, however, the Byzantines were overwhelmed and ambushed by the large number of the Seljuks, many of his men were killed and taken prisoners. Isaac fell from his horse after attempting to stop his men from retreating only to be taken prisoner by the Seljuks.

The Seljuks then attacked the Byzantine camp. Alexios tried to raise to troops moral, only to find himself abandoned by his men and therefore forced to retreat. the Seljuks looted the camp and its baggage. Alexios retreated to Ankara.

== Aftermath ==
At Ankara, Alexios learned about his brother's fate. Isaac managed to ransom himself along number of hostages and follow up with his brother at Ankara.

== Sources ==
- Meško, Marek (2023-06-14). Alexios I Komnenos in the Balkans, 1081–1095. Springer Nature. ISBN 978-3-031-26296-8.
- Basan, Osman Aziz (2010-06-24). The Great Seljuqs: A History. Routledge. ISBN 978-1-136-95393-4.
- Beihammer, Alexander Daniel (2017-02-17). Byzantium and the Emergence of Muslim-Turkish Anatolia, ca. 1040-1130. Routledge. ISBN 978-1-351-98385-3.
- Kausler, Franz Georg F. von (1829). Wörterbuch der Schlachten, Belagerungen und Treffen aller Völker. 4 Bde. [in 5 pt.] (in German).
