= Andronikos Doukas (cousin of Michael VII) =

Byzantine official general (died 1077)

- Died: 14 October 1077
- Noble family: Doukid dynasty
- Spouse: Maria of Bulgaria
- Issue Detail: Irene Doukaina, the Byzantine Empress
- Father: John Doukas
- Mother: Irene Pegonitissa

Andronikos Doukas, Latinized as Andronicus Ducas (Greek: Ανδρόνικος Δούκας; died 14 October 1077), was a protovestiarios and protoproedros of the Byzantine Empire.

== Life ==
Andronikos Doukas was son of the Caesar John Doukas and Irene Pegonitissa. His father was a brother of Emperor Constantine X Doukas. His maternal grandfather was Niketas Pegonites. Andronikos himself was a first cousin of Michael VII Doukas.

In 1071 Andronikos was the commander of a section of the Byzantine army in the campaign of Romanos IV Diogenes against the Seljuk Turks of Alp Arslan. Commanding the rearguard of the army during the Battle of Manzikert, Andronikos announced that the emperor had been cut down and deserted from the battlefield. He was widely blamed for causing the crushing defeat of the Byzantine forces and the subsequent capture of Romanos IV by the enemy.

In 1072, after Romanos had been released by Alp Arslan, Andronikos and his brother Constantine were sent out by Michael VII and their father the Caesar John to intercept him. They defeated Romanos and hunted him down in Cilicia. It was Andronikos who finally obtained Romanos' surrender and conducted him towards Constantinople. In spite of his former hatred for the deposed emperor, Andronikos is said to have opposed his blinding on 29 June 1072.

In an act of 1073, he is recorded with his titles as protoproedros, protovestiarios and megas domestikos, which Michael Attaleiates clarifies as being the post of domestikos ton scholon of the East, which he had been given when sent against Diogenes.

In 1074, together with his father, Andronikos commanded the imperial army against the rebel mercenaries led by Roussel de Bailleul. However when the Byzantine rearguard under Nikephoros III Botaneiates abandoned them (ironic as Andronikos did the same thing at Manzikert), the Battle of the Zompos Bridge was effectively lost. Both were captured by the rebels, who released the badly wounded Andronikos to allow him to seek proper medical treatment in Constantinople. There he recovered for a few years, but in October 1077 died of an edema.

== Family ==
Andronikos Doukas married Maria of Bulgaria, daughter of Troian, a son of Emperor Ivan Vladislav of Bulgaria. Maria of Bulgaria and Andronikos Doukas had seven children:

- Michael Doukas
- Constantine Doukas
- Stephen Doukas
- John Doukas
- Irene Doukaina, who married Emperor Alexios I Komnenos.
- Anna Doukaina, who married George Palaiologos
- Theodora Doukaina, a nun

== Sources ==
- Polemis, Demetrios I. (1968). The Doukai: A Contribution to Byzantine Prosopography. London: The Athlone Press.
- Guilland, Rodolphe (1967). "Le grand domestique". Recherches sur les institutions byzantines [Studies on the Byzantine Institutions]. Berliner byzantinische Arbeiten 35 (in French). Vol. I. Berlin and Amsterdam: Akademie-Verlag & Adolf M. Hakkert. pp. 405–425. OCLC 878894516.
- Kouroupou, Matoula; Vannier, Jean-François (2005), "Commémoraisons des Comnènes dans le typikon liturgique du monastère du Christ Philanthrope (ms. Panaghia Kamariotissa 29)", Revue des études byzantines (in French), 63 (63): 41–69, doi:10.3406/rebyz.2005.2305
