= Pegonites =

Byzantine family name

Pegonites (Greek: Πηγωνίτης), plural Pegonitai and feminine Pegonitissa, was a Byzantine family name between the 11th and 13th centuries. Its etymology is uncertain, but it may be related to the Greek for "chin" (πηγούνι, pegouni).

The first recorded member of the family was Niketas Pegonites, the duke of Dyrrachium who defeated the Bulgars in 1018. He may be the same person as the Niketas, strategetes of Dyrrachium, the father of Irene, wife of the caesar John Doukas, whose epitaph was written by Michael Psellos. Two other 11th-century Pegonitai are known. A Leo Pegonites was the strategos of Preslav and around 1065 a Theodore Pegonites was the duke of Edessa.

The family seems to have been reduced in prominence in the 12th century. Before 1157, a Pegonites was the praktor of Samos and around 1180 a Constantine Pegonites was a tax collector, probably on the Cimmerian Bosporus. These were fiscal positions, but by 1180 there were Pegonitai again holding military posts. An Alexios Pegonites was duke of Thessaloniki in 1180 and another Alexios Pegonites held the same post in about 1230. Another Constantine Pegonites was the duke of Berroia around 1220.

== Bibliography ==
- Grégoire, Henri (1937). "Du nouveau sur l'histoire bulgaro-byzantine: Nicétas Pégonitès vainqueur du roi bulgare Jean Vladislav". Byzantion. 12 (1): 283–291. JSTOR 44169716.
- Kazhdan, Alexander (1991). "Pegonites". In Kazhdan, Alexander (ed.). The Oxford Dictionary of Byzantium. Oxford and New York: Oxford University Press. ISBN 0-19-504652-8.
- Mango, Cyril (1966). "A Byzantine Inscription Relating to Dyrrhachium". Archäologischer Anzeiger. 81: 410–414.
