= Irene Pegonitissa =

- Died: 8 September 1065; Constantinople
- Spouse: John Doukas
- Children: Andronikos Doukas; Constantine Doukas
- Father: Niketas Pegonites
- Family: Pegonites

Irene Pegonitissa (Greek: Ειρήνη Πηγωνιτίσσα) was an 11th‑century Byzantine nobelwoman – a kaisarissa (wife of a caesar), the wife of Caesar John Doukas, who was the younger brother of Emperor Constantine X Doukas.

== Origin and family ==
Almost all the information about her comes from the lengthy funeral oration composed by Michael Psellos for Kaisarissa Irene after her death. In it, Psellos reports that Irene was born in the most beautiful city of Paphlagonia, was the eldest child in her family, and surpassed her younger siblings in both beauty and character. Psellos states that her father, without naming him explicitly, bore a name combining the words for “spring” (Greek: pēgē) and “victory” (nikē), thus meaning “spring of victory.” He notes that this name was entirely fitting for a man distinguished by his victories in the war against the Bulgarians during the reign of Emperor Basil II. On the basis of this information, it is concluded that Irene was the daughter of Patrikios Niketas Pegonites, the doux of Dyrrhachium, who succeeded in killing the Bulgarian tsar Ivan Vladislav in 1018.

Around 1040–1045, Irene Pegonitissa married John Doukas, the younger brother of the future Emperor Constantine X Doukas. She bore him two sons—Andronikos Doukas and Constantine Doukas.

Before her brother-in-law's accession to the throne in 1059, Irene's husband held the rank of magistros and the titles of vestarches and doux. A seal of Irene Pegonitissa depicting the Virgin Blachernitissa is dated to this period; on the seal, Irene is identified by the feminine forms of these titles: magistrissa, vestarchissa, and doukissa.

== Byzantine kaisarissa ==
After Constantine X ascended the throne, he honoured his brother by granting him the title of Caesar. This marked a turning point for Irene, whose family had to move into the imperial palace. Her husband's elevation appears to have unsettled Irene and prompted her to pursue greater virtue. She refused to wear the sumptuous insignia of a kaisarissa and gradually became a model of feminine modesty and restraint, surpassing in this respect both her husband and his imperial relatives. She had known Michael Psellos before Constantine X's accession and therefore sought his advice as someone who had long been a resident of the imperial palace. In this way, Psellos had the opportunity to become acquainted with her spiritual humility and came to serve as a kind of spiritual father to her. In one of his letters to her husband, Michael Psellos accused the couple of conspiring to ensnare him. To this end, Irene had allegedly been sending him bait in the form of gifts of oil, cheese, and other delicacies to which he was particularly partial.

Around 1060, Irene fell ill with hepatitis, but she continued to smile and gave her husband no cause for concern, so that he remained convinced throughout that she was well. She soon made a full recovery from the illness.

By around 1064, the kaisarissa had unexpectedly fallen ill once again, but this time her illness proved fatal. It began in her hand and spread throughout her body, causing fever and draining her strength until she became a hopeless case, beyond the reach of medical treatment. Michael Psellos’s funeral oration describes the grief with which the kaisarissa’s family witnessed her suffering and death. Soon, this grief spread throughout the capital, even though most people had never seen the kaisarissa in person, but had already learned of her virtues. Psellos provides a detailed account of Irene’s final moments, at which he was personally present at her deathbed in his capacity as her physician. In addition to her husband and sons, the emperor and Empress Eudokia were also present. Overcome with grief, Eudokia managed to utter a brief lament. Irene summoned her remaining strength to ask Eudokia to look after her husband and children. The empress embraced her incessantly, so much so that Michael Psellos had to comfort her and eventually ask her to step away from the dying woman. Thus, according to Psellos, the kaisarissa passed away, wholly devoted to God and consoling her husband. For her death, Michael Psellos composed a monody almost a year later—around 1065/66—fearing that he might exaggerate something in her portrayal under the influence of emotion and the fresh grief over her passing.

Kaisarissa Irene was the paternal grandmother of the Byzantine empress Irene Doukaina, the wife of Emperor Alexios I Komnenos. For this reason, the date of the kaisarissa’s death—8 September—is placed first in the so‑called Obituary of the relatives of Empress Irene, included in the typikon of the Constantinopolitan monastery of Christ Philanthropos, founded by Empress Irene Doukaina. Since empress Irene Doukaina was born in 1066, and in his epitaph for the kaisarissa Michael Psellos mentions as already born at that time only her grandsons Michael Doukas (born around 1061) and John Doukas (born around 1064), who were older brothers of Empress Irene, scholars of the document suggest that Kaisarissa Eirene most likely died on 8 September 1065, before the birth of her granddaughter Irene.

== Bibliography ==
- Гръцки извори за българската история (in Bulgarian), vol. VI, София: БАН, 1965
- Византијски извори за историју народа Југославије (PDF) (in Serbian), vol. III, Београд
- Grégoire, Henri (1937), "Du nouveau sur l'histoire bulgaro-byzantine: Nicétas Pégonitès, vainqueur du roi bulgare Jean Vladislav" (PDF), Byzantion (in French), 12 (1/2): 283–291, JSTOR 44169716
- Jeffreys, Michael, ed. (2016), Prosopography of the Byzantine World
- Jeffreys, Michael; Lauxterman, Marc D., eds. (2017), The letters of Psellus. Cultural Networks and Historical Realities, Oxford Studies in Byzantium, Oxford University Press, doi:10.1093/acprof:oso/9780198787228.001.0001, ISBN 9780198787228, online-ISBN 9780191829307
- Kouroupou, Matoula; Vannier, Jean-François (2005), "Commémoraisons des Comnènes dans le typikon liturgique du monastère du Christ Philanthrope (ms. Panaghia Kamariotissa 29)", Revue des études byzantines (in French), 63: 41–69, doi:10.3406/rebyz.2005.2305
- Polemis, Demetrios I. (1968). The Doukai: A Contribution to Byzantine Prosopography. London: The Athlone Press.
- Varzos, Konstantinos (1984). Η Γενεαλογία των Κομνηνών [The Genealogy of the Komnenoi] (PDF) (in Greek). Vol. A1. Thessaloniki: Centre for Byzantine Studies, University of Thessaloniki.
- Wassiliou-Seibt, Alexandra-Kyriaki (2009), "Der Familienname Pegonites auf byzantinischen Siegeln und in anderen schriftlichen Quellen", in Kotzabassi, S.; Mavromatis, G. (eds.), Realia Byzantina (in German), vol. 19, Berlin-New York: Walter de Gruyter, pp. 303–320, ISBN 978-3-11-022230-2
