= Battle of Manzikert =

1071 Seljuk victory over the Byzantines

- Part of the Byzantine–Seljuk wars
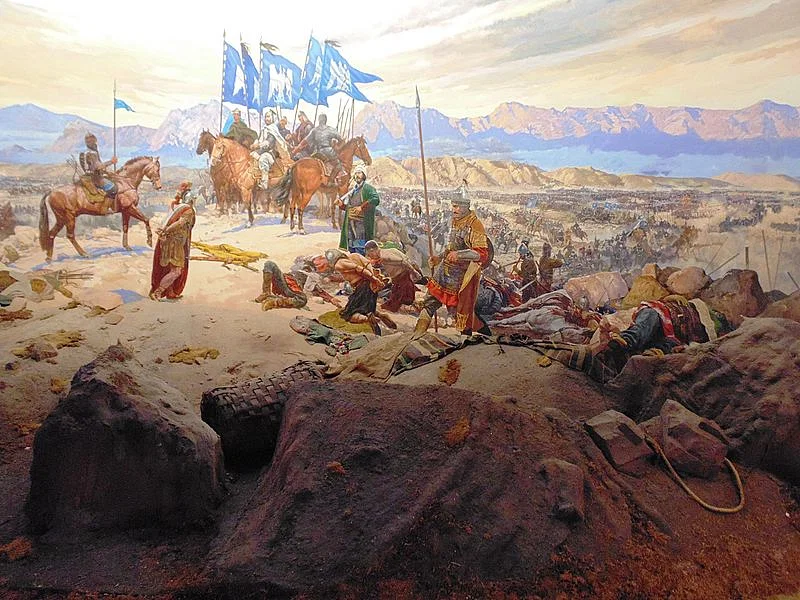
- A painting depicting the capture of Emperor Romanos at the Battle of Malazgirt (Istanbul Military Museum)
Date	26 August 1071
Location	Near Manzikert, Iberia / Byzantine Armenia (present-day Malazgirt, Turkey) 39.10°N 42.59°E
Result	Seljuk victory
Territorial changes	Beginning of Turkic rule and settlement in Anatolia

Belligerents
Byzantine Empire; Regulars and provincial troops; Feudal levies of frontier land owners; Latin, Alanian, Georgian, Armenian, Bulgarian, Turkic mercenaries	Seljuk Empire; Turkic mercenaries (Note: Pechenegs and Uzes defected to the Seljuk side when the war began.)

Commanders and leaders
Romanos IV (POW); Nikephoros Bryennios (WIA); Theodore Alyates; Andronikos Doukas	Alp Arslan

Strength
est. 40,000 (Close to half deserted before the battle and Turkic mercenaries defected to the Seljuk side) 200,000+ (Matthew of Edessa and Muslim sources)	35,000–50,000

Casualties and losses
2,000–8,000 killed; 4,000 captured; 20,000 deserted	Unknown

The Battle of Manzikert or Malazgirt was fought between the Byzantine Empire and the Seljuk Empire on 26 August 1071 near Manzikert, Iberia (modern Malazgirt in Muş Province, eastern Turkey). The decisive defeat of the Byzantine army and the capture of the emperor Romanos IV Diogenes played an important role in undermining Byzantine authority in Anatolia and Armenia, and allowed for the gradual Turkification of Anatolia. Many Turks, travelling westward during the 11th century, saw the victory at Manzikert as an entrance to Asia Minor.

The brunt of the battle was borne by the Byzantine army's professional soldiers from the eastern and western tagmata, as large numbers of mercenaries and Anatolian levies fled early and survived the battle. The fallout from Manzikert was disastrous for the Byzantines, resulting in civil conflicts and an economic crisis that severely weakened the Byzantine Empire's ability to defend its borders adequately. This led to the mass movement of Turks into central Anatolia – by 1080, an area of 78,000 square kilometres (30,000 sq mi) had been gained by the Seljuk Turks. It took three decades of internal strife before Alexius I (1081–1118) restored stability to Byzantium. Historian Thomas Asbridge says: "In 1071, the Seljuqs crushed an imperial army at the Battle of Manzikert (in eastern Asia Minor), and though historians no longer consider this to have been an utterly cataclysmic reversal for the Greeks, it still was a stinging setback." It was the only time a Byzantine emperor became the prisoner of a Muslim commander, and the first time since Valerian that a Roman emperor was captured alive by an enemy force.

== Background ==
Although the Byzantine Empire had remained strong and powerful in the early Middle Ages, it began to decline under the reign of the militarily incompetent Constantine IX Monomachos and again under Constantine X Doukas – a brief two-year period of reform under Isaac I Komnenos merely delayed the decay of the Byzantine army.

About 1053, Constantine IX disbanded what the 11th century Byzantine historian John Skylitzes called the "Iberian Army", which consisted of 50,000 men. Skylitzes' contemporaries, the former officials Michael Attaleiates and Kekaumenos, agree that by demobilizing these soldiers, Constantine did catastrophic harm to the empire's eastern defenses. Constantine made a truce with the Seljuks that lasted until 1064, when a large Seljuk army under Alp Arslan attacked the theme of Iberia and took Ani; after a siege of 25 days, they captured the city.

In 1068, Romanos IV Diogenes took power and, after some military reforms, conducted two major campaigns to combat the Seljuks and their Mirdasid allies. He retook the city of Hierapolis in 1068 and chased after Turkoman armies that were raiding across Anatolia, with limited success, but he was unable to score a decisive victory in 1069. In 1069 or 1070, Manuel Komnenos lead an expedition against the Seljuks, thwarting an attack against Iconium with a counterattack. However, he was then defeated in the Battle of Sebasteia by Arisighi, Alp Arslan's brother-in-law, who then joined Byzantines, providing them with information regarding Seljuk politics and tactics. Alp Arslan then sent Afshin Bey to get Arisighi back, but he was refused at Chrysopolis, causing him to sack and pillage multiple Byzantine cities in retaliation.

After Alp Arslan failed to capture Edessa following a lengthy siege, he focused his forces on besieging Aleppo. Romanos saw this as an opportunity to lead a large army into Armenia to recover the lost fortresses, before the Seljuks had time to respond.

== Prelude ==
Accompanying Romanos was Andronikos Doukas, son of his rival John Doukas. The army consisted of about 5,000 professional Byzantine troops from the western provinces and probably about the same number from the eastern provinces. These included long established regular units (Heteria, cholai and Straelati) of the central field army (Tagmata). Under Doukas, the rear guard at Manzikert was largely made up of the private retinues and peasant levies of the border lords (archontes). Finally, the large and diverse host included 500 Frankish and Norman mercenaries under Roussel de Bailleul, some Turkic (Uz and Pecheneg) and Bulgarian mercenaries, infantry under the Duke of Antioch, a contingent of Georgian and Armenian troops and some (but not all) of the Varangian Guard to total around 40,000 men. The quantity of the provincial troops had declined in the years before Romanos, as the government diverted funding to mercenaries who were judged less likely to be involved in politics and could be disbanded after use to save money.

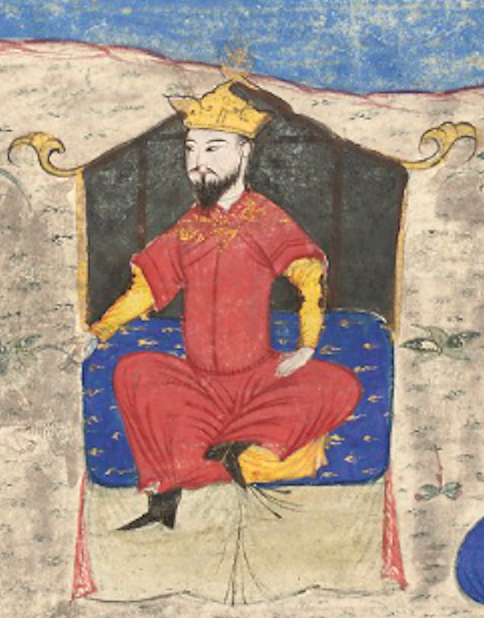
Depiction of Alp Arslan from the Majma al-Tawarikh by Hafiz Abru circa 1425

The march across Asia Minor was long and difficult. Romanos brought a luxurious baggage train, which did not endear him to his troops. The local population also suffered plundering by his Frankish mercenaries, whom he was obliged to dismiss. The expedition rested at Sebasteia on the Halys River, reaching Theodosiopolis in June 1071. Some of his generals suggested continuing the march into the Seljuk territory and catching Alp Arslan before he was ready. Others, including Nicephorus Bryennius, suggested they wait and fortify their position. It was decided to continue the march. Then they moved to Khnus city. The Byzantine army, which was heading towards the Malazgirt Plain, chose the route of the Kocasu Stream flowing through Khnus as a route to meet its water needs, and the army manufactured the spears to be used in the war from the trees growing in Khnus and its surroundings.

Thinking that Alp Arslan was either further away or not coming at all, Romanos marched towards Lake Van, expecting to retake Manzikert quickly and the nearby fortress of Khliat if possible. Alp Arslan was already in the area, however, with allies and 30,000 cavalry from Aleppo and Mosul. He also was reinforced by the Marwanid emir, Nizam al-Din ibn Nasr al-Dawla, who sent a force of Kurdish fighters estimated at 10,000. Alp Arslan's scouts knew exactly where Romanos was, while Romanos was completely unaware of his opponent's movements.

Having made peace with the Byzantines, the Seljuks intended to attack Egypt until Alp Arslan learned in Aleppo of the Byzantine advance. He returned north and met the Byzantines north of Lake Van.

Romanos ordered his general Joseph Tarchaniotes to take some of the regular troops and the Varangians and accompany the Pechenegs and Franks to Khliat. At the same time, Romanos and the rest of the army marched to Manzikert. This split the forces into halves of about 20,000 men each. It is unknown what happened to the army sent off with Tarchaniotes – according to Islamic sources, Alp Arslan smashed this army, yet Byzantine sources make no mention of any such encounter, and Attaliates suggests that Tarchaniotes fled at the sight of the Seljuk Sultan – an unlikely event considering the reputation of the Byzantine general. Either way, Romanos' army was reduced to less than half his planned 40,000 men.

== Battle ==
Alp Arslan summoned his army and delivered a speech while dressed in a white robe similar to an Islamic funeral shroud on the morning of the battle. This was an encouraging message that he was ready to die in battle. Romanos was unaware of the loss of Tarchaneiotes and continued to Manzikert, which he easily captured on 23 August; the Seljuks responded with attacks by horse archers. The next day, some foraging parties under Bryennios discovered the main Seljuk force and were forced to retreat to Manzikert. Romanos sent the Armenian general Basilakes and some cavalry, as Romanos did not believe this was Alp Arslan's full army. The cavalry was routed, and Basilakes was taken prisoner. Romanos then drew his troops into formation and sent the left wing out under Bryennios, who was almost surrounded by the rapidly approaching Turks and forced to retreat. The Seljuk forces hid among the nearby hills for the night, making it nearly impossible for Romanos to counterattack.

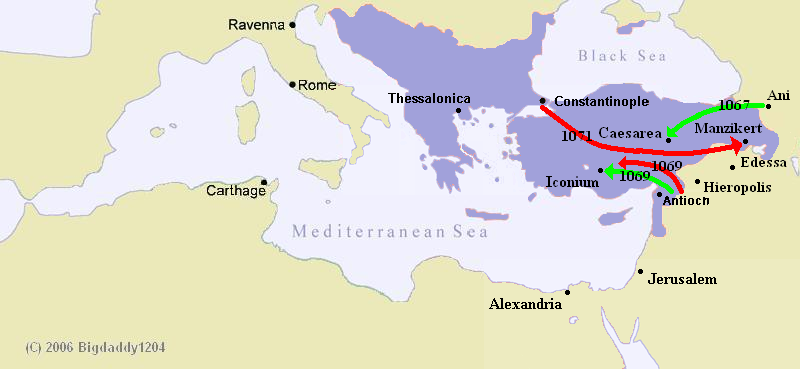
Byzantine territory (purple), Byzantine attacks (red) and Seljuk attacks (green)

On 25 August, some of Romanos' Turkic mercenaries came into contact with their Seljuk kin and deserted. Romanos then rejected a Seljuk peace emissary. He wanted to settle the eastern question and the persistent Turkic incursions and settlements with a decisive military victory. He understood that raising another army would be both difficult and expensive. The emperor attempted to recall Tarchaneiotes and his half of the forces, but they were no longer in the area. There were no engagements that day, but on 26 August, the Byzantine army gathered itself into a proper battle formation and began to march on the Seljuk positions, with the left wing under Bryennios, the right wing under Theodore Alyates, and the centre under the emperor. Andronikos Doukas led the reserve forces in the rear – a foolish mistake by the emperor, considering the dubious loyalties of the Doukas family. The Seljuks were organized into a crescent formation about four kilometres away. Seljuk horse archers attacked the Byzantines as they drew closer; the centre of their crescent continually moved backwards while the wings moved to surround the Byzantine troops.

The Byzantines pressed on despite the arrow attacks and captured Alp Arslan's camp by the end of the afternoon. However, the right and left wings, where the arrows did most of their damage, almost broke up when individual units tried to force the Seljuks into a pitched battle; the Seljuk cavalry simply disengaged when challenged, in the characteristic Parthian tactics of steppe warriors. With the Seljuks avoiding battle, Romanos was forced to order a withdrawal by nightfall. However, the right wing misunderstood the order, and Doukas deliberately ignored the emperor's order to cover the army's withdrawal and marched directly back to the Byzantine camp outside Manzikert. With the Byzantines thoroughly confused, the Seljuks seized the opportunity and attacked. The Byzantine right wing was almost immediately routed, thinking they were betrayed either by the Armenians or the army's Turkish auxiliaries. Some authors suppose that Armenians were the first to flee, and they all managed to get away, while by contrast, the Turkish auxiliaries remained loyal to the end. Other sources suggest that Armenian infantry stoutly resisted and did not turn tail, not abandoning the emperor as many had. When Romanos saw the boldness of the Armenian foot soldiers, he displayed great affection for them and promised them unheard-of rewards. In the end, the emperor's personal troops and these Armenian foot soldiers suffered the heaviest casualties in the Byzantine army. The left wing under Bryennios held out a little longer but was also soon routed. The remnants of the Byzantine centre, including the emperor and the Varangian Guard, were encircled by the Seljuks. Romanos was wounded and taken prisoner by the Seljuks. The survivors were many who fled the field and were pursued throughout the night, but not beyond that; by dawn, the professional core of the Byzantine army had been destroyed, while many of the peasant troops and levies who had been under the command of Andronikos had fled.

=== Captivity of Romanos Diogenes ===
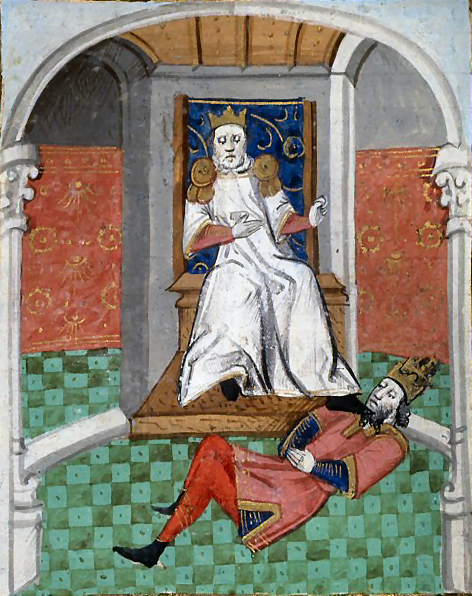
Alp Arslan humiliating Romanos IV. From a 15th-century illustrated French translation of Boccaccio's De casibus virorum illustrium.

When Romanos was conducted into the presence of Alp Arslan, the Sultan refused to believe that the bloodied and tattered man covered in dirt was the mighty Emperor of the Romans. After discovering his identity, Alp Arslan placed his boot on the emperor's neck and forced him to kiss the ground, a traditional symbolic gesture at the time. Alp Arslan then treated Romanos with considerable kindness and again offered the terms of peace that he had offered before the battle.

According to Ibn al-Adim, in the presence of Arslan, Romanos blamed the raids of Rashid al-Dawla Mahmud into Byzantine territory for his interventions in Muslim territories which eventually led to the Battle of Manzikert. Romanos remained a captive of the Sultan for a week. During this time, the Sultan allowed Romanos to eat at his table while concessions were agreed upon: Antioch, Edessa, Hierapolis, and Manzikert were to be surrendered. This would have left the vital core of Anatolia untouched. A payment of 10 million gold pieces demanded by the Sultan as a ransom for Romanos was deemed as too high by the latter, so the Sultan reduced its short-term expense by asking for 1.5 million gold pieces as an initial payment instead, followed by an annual sum of 360,000 gold pieces. Plus, a marriage alliance was prepared between Alp Arslan's son and Romanos’ daughter. The Sultan then gave Romanos many presents and an escort of two emirs and one hundred Mamluks on his route to Constantinople.

Shortly after his return to his subjects, Romanos found his rule in serious trouble. Despite attempts to raise loyal troops, he was defeated three times in battle against the Doukas family and was deposed, blinded, and exiled to the island of Proti. He died soon after due to an infection caused by his brutal blinding. Romanos' final foray into the Anatolian heartland, which he had worked so hard to defend, was a public humiliation.

== Aftermath ==
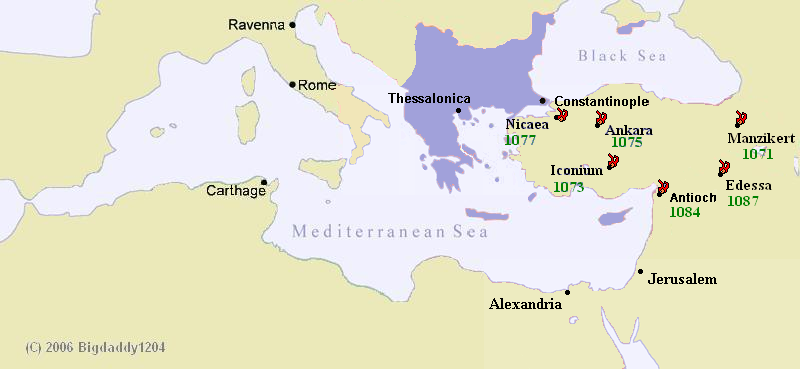
The Turks did not move into Anatolia until after Alp Arslan's death in 1072.

While Manzikert was a long-term strategic catastrophe for Byzantium, it was by no means the massacre that historians earlier presumed. Modern scholars estimate that Byzantine losses were relatively low, considering that many units survived the battle intact and were fighting elsewhere within a few months, and most Byzantine prisoners of war were later released. Certainly, all the commanders on the Byzantine side (Doukas, Tarchaneiotes, Bryennios, Theodore Alyates, de Bailleul, and, above all, the Emperor) survived and took part in later events. Andronikus returned to the capital, Tarchaneiotes did not take part, and Bryennios and all the others, including Romanos, took part in the ensuing civil war. The battle did not directly change the balance of power between the Byzantines and the Seljuks; however, the ensuing civil war within the Byzantine Empire did, to the advantage of the Seljuks.

Doukas had escaped without casualties and quickly marched back to Constantinople, where he led a coup against Romanos and proclaimed his cousin Michael VII as basileus. Bryennios also lost a few men in the rout of his wing. The Seljuks did not pursue the fleeing Byzantines, nor did they recapture Manzikert itself at this point. The Byzantine army regrouped and marched to Dokeia, where they were joined by Romanos when he was released a week later. The most serious material loss was the emperor's extravagant baggage train.

The result of this disastrous defeat was, in simplest terms, the loss of the Eastern Roman Empire's Anatolian heartland. John Julius Norwich says in his trilogy on the Byzantine Empire that the defeat was "its death blow, though centuries remained before the remnant fell. The themes in Anatolia were literally the heart of the empire, and within decades after Manzikert, they were gone." In his smaller book, A Short History of Byzantium, Norwich describes the battle as "the greatest disaster suffered by the Empire in its seven and a half centuries of existence". Steven Runciman, in his "History of the Crusades", wrote that "the Battle of Manzikert was the most decisive disaster in Byzantine history. The Byzantines themselves had no illusions about it. Again and again, their historians refer to that dreadful day."

Anna Komnene, writing a few decades after the actual battle, wrote:

...the fortunes of the Roman Empire had sunk to their lowest ebb. For the armies of the East were dispersed in all directions, because the Turks had over-spread, and gained command of, countries between the Euxine Sea [Black Sea] and the Hellespont, and the Aegean Sea and Syrian Seas [Mediterranean Sea], and the various bays, especially those which wash Pamphylia, Cilicia, and empty themselves into the Egyptian Sea [Mediterranean Sea].

Years and decades later, Manzikert came to be seen as a disaster for the Empire; thus, later sources greatly exaggerated the number of troops and casualties. Byzantine historians would often look back and lament the "disaster" of that day, pinpointing it as the moment the decline of the Empire began. It was not an immediate disaster, but the defeat showed the Seljuks that the Byzantines were not invincible. The usurpation by Andronikos Doukas also politically destabilized the empire, and it was difficult to organize resistance to the Turkic migrations that followed the battle. Finally, while intrigue and the deposition of emperors had taken place before, Romanos' fate was particularly horrific, and the destabilization caused by it also rippled through the empire for centuries.

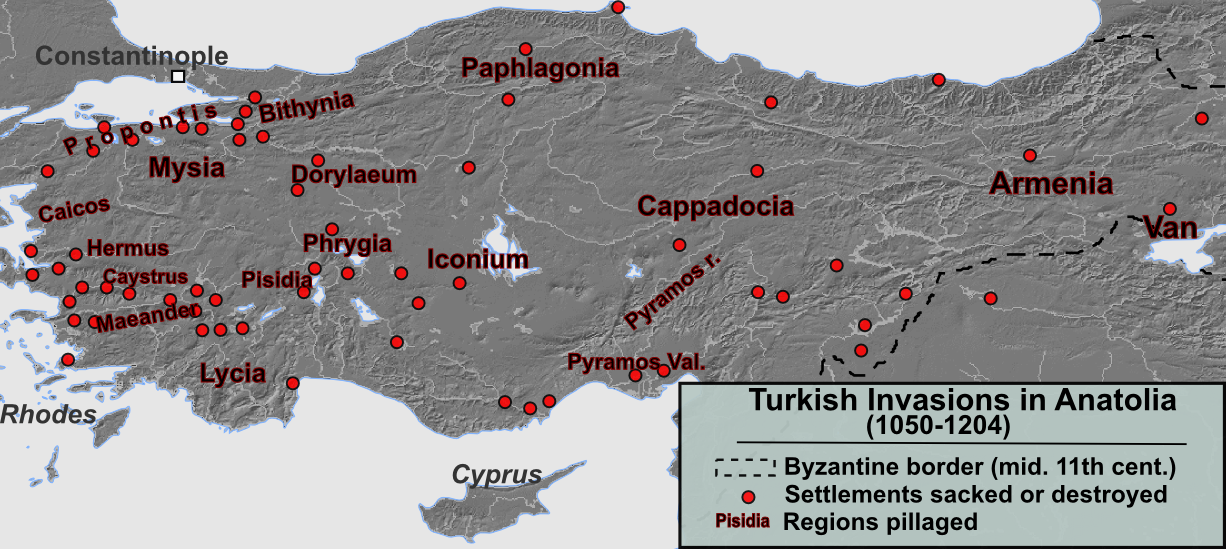
Settlements and regions affected during the first wave of Turkish invasions in Asia Minor (until 1204)

What followed the battle was a chain of events – of which the battle was the first link – that undermined the Empire in the years to come. They included intrigues for the throne, the fate of Romanos, and Roussel de Bailleul's attempting to carve himself an independent kingdom in Galatia with his 3,000 Frankish, Norman, and German mercenaries. He defeated the Emperor's uncle John Doukas, who had come to suppress him, advancing toward the capital to destroy Chrysopolis (Üsküdar) on the Asian coast of the Bosphorus. The Empire finally turned to the Seljuks to crush de Bailleul, which they did. However, the Turks ransomed him back to his wife, and it was only after the young general Alexios Komnenos pursued him that he was captured. These events all interacted to create a vacuum that the Turks filled. Their choice to establish their capital in Nikaea (Iznik) in 1077 could be explained by a desire to see if the Empire's struggles could present new opportunities.

In hindsight, both Byzantine and modern historians are unanimous in dating the decline of Byzantine fortunes to this battle. As Paul K. Davis writes, "Byzantine defeat severely limited the power of the Byzantines by denying them control over Anatolia, the major recruiting ground for soldiers. Henceforth, the Muslims controlled the region. The Byzantine Empire was limited to the area immediately around Constantinople, and the Byzantines were never again a serious military force." It is also seen as one of the root causes for the later Crusades, in that the First Crusade of 1095 was originally a western response to the Byzantine emperor's call for military assistance after the loss of Anatolia. From another perspective, the West saw Manzikert as a signal that Byzantium was no longer capable of being the protector of Eastern Christianity or of Christian pilgrims to the Holy Places in the Middle East. Delbrück considers the battle's importance exaggerated, but the evidence makes clear that it resulted in the Empire's inability to put an effective army into the field for many years.

Historian Andrew Holt made Romanos the subject of his contribution to the 2022 anthology The Worst Military Leaders in History since a defeat with such negative long term consequences was in large part Romanos's fault. Holt concedes that the problems with the Byzantine armies had been developing for decades, but a more careful commander would have addressed them more thoroughly before initiating any campaigns. Those campaigns and how he ran them were also compromised by political considerations, most significantly the fateful decision to give such a significant command to Andronikos, whose duplicity cost Romanos half his forces when they were most needed. That decision to divide his forces additionally relied on poor intelligence, as it was unwise if Romanos truly knew how near Arslan was and how many troops he had. Once in battle, his troops were "poorly led, poorly disciplined and often confused", as demonstrated by the belief among the army that the retreat he ordered once the Turkish crescent formation had resulted in the Byzantines almost becoming encircled was, in fact, a signal that Romanos himself had been captured or killed, leading the army to panic.

The Battle of Myriokephalon (or Myriocephalum) has been compared to the Battle of Manzikert as a pivotal point in the decline of the Byzantine Empire. In both battles, separated by over a hundred years, a more elusive Seljuk opponent ambushed a large Byzantine army. However, the implications of Myriocephalum were initially limited, thanks to Manuel I Komnenos' holding on to power. The same could not be said of Romanos, whose enemies "martyred a courageous and upright man," and as a result "the Empire ... would never recover."

== Cultural references ==
In the aftermath of the battle, Norman soldiers who had served in the Byzantine armies spread tales about the defeat and likely inspired an episode in the Chanson de Roland in which the amirant of Babylon, Baligant, fights Charlemagne and is defeated only through the aid of Saint Gabriel.

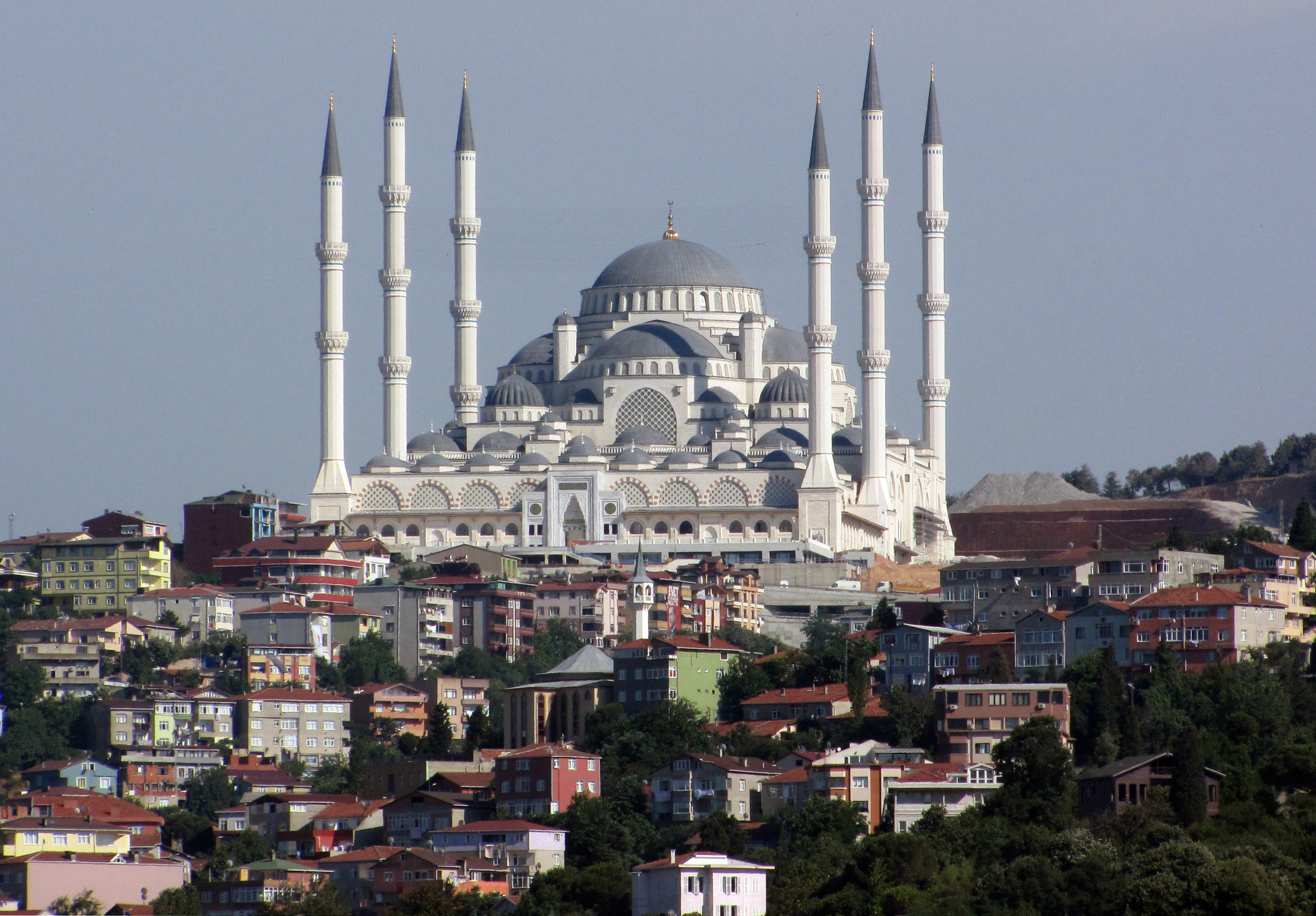
Çamlıca Mosque, Istanbul

The largest mosque in Turkey, the Çamlıca Mosque of Istanbul, has four minarets that span 107.1 metres (351 ft), a measurement that refers to the Battle of Manzikert (1071). In 2018, Turkey's ruling AKP announced their future agenda for 2023, 2053 and 2071 targets: 100th anniversary of the republic, 600th anniversary of conquest of Istanbul and 1000th anniversary of battle of Manzikert, respectively.
