= Roussel de Bailleul =

Norman adventurer and Byzantine general

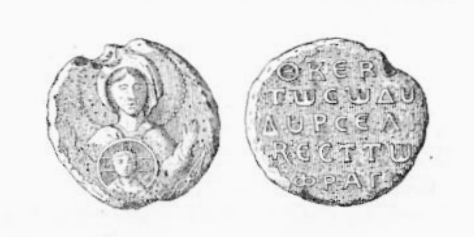
Roussel's seal, with the Virgin Mary; the reverse translates as "Mother of God, give comfort to your servant Urselius, the vestiarios, the Frank"

Roussel de Bailleul (died 1077), known in Greek as Ourselios (Greek: Οὐρσέλιος), and by the nickname Phrangopoulos (Greek: Φραγγόπουλος, lit. 'son-of-a-Frank'), was a Norman adventurer (or exile) who travelled to Byzantium and was a soldier under the Emperor Romanos IV Diogenes (ruled 1068–71).

== Life ==
The origin of Roussel is unknown. His given name might have been Ursellus in Latin. There are three villages in Normandy called Bailleul. According to Richard A. Fletcher, Roussel was a native of Bailleul near Argentan, in southern Normandy.

Roussel is mentioned for the first time in 1063 as fighting under Roger de Hauteville in Sicily. He ventured with the Apulian Normans to Italy, settled in Terra d'Otranto and served under Roger de Hauteville in Sicily. According to Geoffrey Malaterra, Roussel distinguished himself with his bravery at the Battle of Cerami, where he urged Count Roger to pursue the fleeing Saracens. Aside from this brief account by Malaterra, the Alexiad of Anna Komnene is the main source for Roussel.

He was at the campaign of Manzikert in 1071, but did not participate in the battle, as he was previously dispatched by the Emperor Romanos to Chliat to forage and plunder. Afterwards he remained in imperial service, and was sent into Asia Minor again with a force of 3,000 Franco-Norman heavy cavalry, where he conquered some territory in Galatia and Lycaonia and founded an independent principality in 1073, with himself as prince, following the example set by his fellow Normans in the Mezzogiorno. His capital was Ancyra, now the capital of Turkey. In order to subdue him, the Byzantine court sent an army under the Emperor's uncle, kaisar John Doukas, and Nikephoros Botaneiates against Roussel but they were defeated in a battle at an important bridge of the Sangarios river. The battle was known as the Battle of the Zompos Bridge.

Strengthened by this victory, Roussel proceeded with his army to the Chrysopolis, just opposite Constantinople and sacked it. He then set up John Doukas as a usurper candidate to the imperial throne, most likely to gain more backing from the local population and attract more soldiers. Emperor Michael VII reacted in panic and tried on one hand to appease Roussel by promising him titles and releasing his wife and children who had been hostages in Constantinople while on the other hand making a deal with Artuq, a general of Seljuk warlord Tutush I to remove Roussel. During the following skirmishes both Roussel and Doukas were captured but instead of delivering the prisoners to the Byzantines, Roussel's wife paid a ransom for her husband and Roussel returned to his lands.

He continued to expand his control over lands in the former Armeniakon theme and also gained control over urban centres such as Amasea and Neokaiserea. It seems that Roussel was able to collect tax revenues, strengthen his military power through military fortresses and making deals with local elites in return for providing protection against the invading Turkmen. In a time where the imperial authority in Anatolia was crumbling, the relative security of Roussel's domain was a challenge to the court in Constantinople. Roussel's popularity with the locals was so strong that the next Byzantine general sent to capture him, the future emperor Alexios Komnenos, had to use a ploy to take him in 1075.

In 1077, Roussel was ransomed from his Constantinopolitan imprisonment to lead a battalion against Nikephoros Bryennios the Elder. Roussel garrisoned in Perinthus and he was joined there by Nikephoritzes after the fall of Michael VII. Roussel died suddenly and Nikephoritzes was accused of having poisoned him.

== In literature ==
Roussel's life was the subject of a 1954 novel by Alfred Duggan, The Lady for Ransom.

== Annotations ==
1. His name is often spelt as in French, Roussel de Bailleul, which is rendered in various ways as Ursellus de Balliol, Ursellus de Ballione, etc. In Greek, his name was spelt Ourselios (Anna Komnene) and Rouselios (Michael Attaleiates). His nickname in Greek was Phrangopoulos.

== Sources ==
- Green, Judith A. (2022-01-01). The Normans: Power, Conquest and Culture in 11th-century Europe. Yale University Press. ISBN 978-0-300-18033-6.
- Beihammer, Alexander Daniel (2017). Byzantium and the Emergence of Muslim-Turkish Anatolia, Ca. 1040-1130. Taylor & Francis. ISBN 978-1351983860.
- Norwich, John Julius. The Normans in the South, 1016–1130. London: Longmans, 1967.
- Gravett, Christopher, and Nicolle, David. The Normans: Warrior Knights and their Castles. Oxford: Osprey Publishing, 2006.
- Schlumberger, Gustave (1881). "Deux chefs normands des armées byzantines au XI^{e} siècle: Sceaux de Herve et de Raoul de Bailleul" (PDF). Revue Historique. 16: 289–303.
