= John Doukas (Caesar) =

John Doukas Ιωάννης Δούκας
- Emperor and Autocrat of the Romans; Kaisar
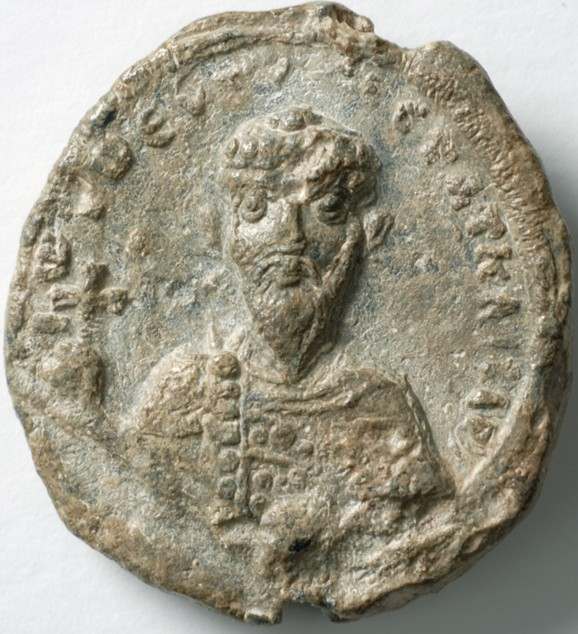
- Seal of John Doukas as Caesar

Usurper of the Byzantine Empire
- Reign: 1074
- Predecessor: Michael VII
- Successor: Nikephoros III

Caesar of the Byzantine Empire
- First Reign: c. 1060—1074
- Regent: List of Emperors: Constantine X Doukas (c. 1060–1067); Michael VII Doukas (c. 1060–1074); Konstantios Doukas (c. 1060–1074); Romanos IV Diogenes (1068–1074); Andronikos Doukas (1068–1074)
- Second Reign: 1081—1088
- Regent: List of Emperors: Alexios Komnenos (1081–1088); Constantine Doukas (1081–1087)
- Basileopator: c. 1071—1078
- Born: c. 1000
- Died: c. 1088
- Spouse: Irene Pegonitissa
- Issue: Andronikos Doukas; Constantine Doukas
- Dynasty: Doukas
- Father: Andronikos Doukas (not his grandson)

John Doukas (or Ducas) (Greek: Ιωάννης Δούκας, Iōannēs Doukas) (died c. 1088) was the son of Andronikos Doukas, a Paphlagonian nobleman who may have served as governor of the theme of Bulgaria (Moesia), and the older brother of Emperor Constantine X Doukas. John Doukas was the paternal grandfather of Irene Doukaina, wife of Emperor Alexios I Komnenos.

He was the original owner of Codex Parisinus graecus 2009, i.e. the oldest known and preserved manuscript of De Administrando Imperio written by Emperor Constantine VII Porphyrogenitus, and copied by one of Doukas' scribes, a well-known encyclopedic Byzantine source on foreign nations from the 10th century.

== Career as Caesar ==
John Doukas, who was given the court dignity of Caesar by his brother Constantine X, was one of the most influential members of the court aristocracy from the death of his brother into that of Alexios I Komnenos. His wealth derived of estates in Thrace and Bithynia, and he was a close friend of the historian Michael Psellos. Although he is usually documented by the sources as a member of the court, he had begun his career as a general.

After serving as a counsellor and supporter of his brother, John came to the fore after his brother's death in 1067 as the natural protector of the rights of his nephew Michael VII Doukas. His position as Caesar and his family's influence in the Senate meant that he was behind the opposition of the court officials to the Empress Mother Eudokia Makrembolitissa and her marriage to Romanos IV Diogenes. Over the course of the next three years he became the emperor's bitterest enemy, but his intriguing meant that the Caesar spent much of Romanos' reign in retirement on his estates in Bithynia. It was here that he learned that his son Andronikos Doukas had joined and then deserted the emperor in the disastrous campaign ending with the Battle of Manzikert in 1071.

Romanos' captivity gave John the opportunity to return to court at the request of Eudokia Makrembolitissa. Joining forces with Michael Psellos, the Caesar made the Empress share power with her son, and then forced her to become a nun and retire from court affairs in October 1071. He soon became the de facto head of the Government in the name of Michael VII, ordering the empire not to acknowledge Romanus as emperor, declaring that Romanos had been elevated to the throne to act for Michael, who was now able to administer the empire. The Caesar sent his sons Andronikos and Constantine to capture Romanos IV, who had been released from captivity and thus ensured the sole rule of his nephew Michael VII. John Doukas initially agreed to allow Romanos to resign the purple and retire to a monastery. But his hatred of Romanos was so great that he reneged on the agreement and ordered that Romanos be blinded, sending him a mocking message congratulating him on the loss of his eyes as he lay dying from the infected wound. With the elimination of Romanos, John and Michael Psellos were supreme at court.

The Caesar was undone, however, by one of his own creatures, the eunuch Nikephoritzes. By 1073 the eunuch had gained the confidence of Michael VII, whom he turned against his uncle. The Caesar was forced to retire to his great estates, where he amused himself by hunting in the forests near the shores of the Bosphorus.

== Rebellion of 1074 ==
In the meantime, the progress of the Seljuk Turks roused the Byzantine government into action, gathering together an army of mercenaries under the command of Isaac Komnenos. The Norman mercenaries, led by Roussel de Bailleul, rebelled against the Byzantines, crushed an imperial army at the decisive Battle of the Zompos Bridge, and attempted to establish an independent kingdom in Anatolia.

The situation in Asia Minor was now so dire, that in 1074 Michael was forced to order his uncle to take command of an imperial army and defeat the Norman mercenaries. Fixing his headquarters at Dorylaeum, the two armies met near the bridge over the Zompi River, one of the great lines of communication between Constantinople and the central provinces in Asia Minor. Betrayed by his Frankish mercenaries and by the shameful retreat of the Asiatic reserves under the command of the future Emperor Nikephoros III Botaneiates, John was defeated and captured together with his son Andronikos. The victorious mercenaries then proceeded to advance to the shores of the Bosphorus, as a relieving force under John's younger son Constantine disintegrated when its commander suddenly died.

Roussel, unsure if his mercenary force could overthrow the emperor at Constantinople, decided to act as the chief general for his own emperor. He proclaimed John Doukas emperor, easily persuading his prisoner to assume the title and dethrone his ungrateful nephew, and they continued on their way to Constantinople.

Michael VII and Nikephoritzes were deeply concerned about their own safety. They formed an alliance with Suleiman ibn Qutulmish, Seljuk sultan of Rûm, concluding a formal treaty between the Byzantines and the Turks, whereby Michael gave to Suleiman the government of the provinces of which the Seljuk Turks were in possession of. The Turks agreed to provide an army to fight on Michael's behalf, and this army moved quickly to Mount Sophon where John Doukas and Roussel were encamped. The mercenaries were ambushed and although Roussel managed to escape, John was captured, ending the rebellion.

After some time as a Seljuk captive, John was ransomed by his nephew. Michael allowed him to retain his sight on condition that he renounce all imperial ambitions and he take the additional precaution of becoming a monk.

== Return to politics ==
The tonsured Caesar retained some influence on political events. With the collapse of imperial authority late in Michael VII's reign, he advised his nephew to abdicate and become a monk when Nikephoros III Botaneiates threatened Constantinople in 1078, and in 1081 he fled Constantinople to join Alexios Komnenos and to persuade him to revolt against Botaneiates and claim the throne. It was also John Doukas, who arranged for the marriage of his granddaughter Irene Doukaina to Alexios Komnenos over the objections of the latter's mother Anna Dalassene. In this change of circumstance, he abandoned the monastic habit and Alexios allowed him to resume his old position as Caesar. Remaining part of the court, he continued to advise the emperor until his death in c. 1088.

== Family ==
Neither John nor his brother Constantine X were descended from the male branch of the ancient family of Doukas which became extinct after a revolt during the minority of Constantine VII’s reign. He was descended from the female line, and his family was originally called Doukitzes, to mark the inferiority of the modern house which had assumed the name of Doukas.

By his wife Irene Pegonitissa, John Doukas had at least two sons, both of whom predeceased him:

1. Andronikos Doukas, who was the father of Irene Doukaina, wife of Alexios I Komnenos
2. Constantine Doukas, who died in 1074.
