= J. P. Gumbert =

Dutch medievalist and codicologist (1936–2016)

Johan Peter Gumbert
- Born: 23 January 1936; Nijmegen, Netherlands
- Died: 18 August 2016 (aged 80); Leiden, Netherlands

Academic background
- Education: Leiden University
- Influences: G. I. Lieftinck

Academic work
- Discipline: Palaeography and codicology
- Institutions: Leiden University
- Notable students: Jos Biemans, G.C. (Gerda) Huisman, Erik Kwakkel, Eef Overgaauw

Johan Peter Gumbert (23 January 1936 – 18 August 2016), known in print as J.P. Gumbert, was a Dutch academic who specialised in medieval European manuscripts. From 1979 to 2001 he was Professor, and then Professor Emeritus, of Western Palaeography and Codicology at Leiden University.

== Personal life ==
Born in Nijmegen, Netherlands, Gumbert was the son of Hans Ludwig Gumbert (1903–1994), an antiquarian who managed the Utrecht bookshop and auction house J.L. Beijers. Following completion of his studies at Stedelijk Gymnasium Nijmegen, Gumbert went on to read classics at Leiden University where he met his wife, the classicist Marijke Hepp. The couple had three children, Eline, Max, and Barbara.

== Education and career ==
During the final year of his initial degree at Leiden, Gumbert became assistant to G.I. Lieftinck (1902–1994), Keeper of Manuscripts and (then) Lector in Medieval Manuscripts, joining the latter’s staff after completion of his studies. In 1979, he succeeded his mentor Lieftinck to become the last Professor of Western Palaeography and Codicology at Leiden University. His 1972 doctoral dissertation, subsequently published in a trade edition, examined manuscript production by the monks of the Utrecht Charterhouse (known as Kartuize Nieuwlicht or Nova Lux), a Carthusian monastery in Utrecht.

An internationally recognised authority on the medieval book, Gumbert was invited to take up research scholarships at multiple institutions throughout Europe, as well as in the United States and Israel, but elected to remain at Leiden. He sat on the editorial boards of numerous academic journals and scholarly series, organised several informal circles devoted to codicology and palaeography, and acted as both treasurer and committee member for the prestigious cipl, Comité International de Paléographie Latine, for half a decade. In addition, he co-founded the academic journal Gazette du Livre Médiéval, and helped establish apices the Association Paléographique Internationale — Culture, Écriture, Société in 1993. His 1989 Panizzi Lectures at the British Library was published in 1990 as The Dutch and Their Books in the Manuscript Age. A prolific and well-respected scholar, he published individual research and editorial works in multiple languages including Dutch, English, French, and German. A full bibliography of his output to 2003 is available in the special issue of Quaerendo published in his honour in 2003.

== Awards and honours ==
Regarded as "unquestionably one of the most prominent codicologists the Netherlands has produced", Gumbert was an elected member of the Comité International de Paléographie Latine, and, from 1997, a member of knaw, Koninklijke Nederlandse Akademie van Wetenschappen (Royal Netherlands Academy of Arts and Sciences). In 2011 he was appointed Ridder (Knight) in the Orde van Oranje-Nassau for his contributions to scholarship. The scholarly journal Quaerendo published a special issue in his honour in 2003.

== Selected publications ==
Authored books

- Bat Books: A Catalogue of Folded Manuscripts Containing Almanacs or Other Texts (Turnhout, Brepols, 2016).
- Illustrated Inventory of Medieval Manuscripts in Latin Script in the Netherlands (Hilversum, Verloren, 2009–2011).
- The Dutch and Their Books in the Manuscript Age. Panizzi Lectures 1989 (British Library, 1990).
- Manuscrits Datés Conservés Dans Les Pays-Bas. Tome II: Les Manuscrits d'Origine Néerlandaise (XIVe–XVIe Siècles) et Supplément au Tome Premier. (Brill, 1988).
- Illustrated Inventory of Medieval Manuscripts in the Netherlands (Inventaire Illustré des Manuscrits Médiévaux aux Pays-Bas; Illustriertes Inventar Mittelalterlicher Manuskripte in den Niederlanden) [IIMM]. 3 Vols. (Leiden, 1984–1987).
- Die Utrechter Kartauser und Ihre Bucher Im Fruhen Funfzehnten Jahrhundert. (Leiden, 1974).

Edited volumes

- (with M.J.M. de Haan). Essays Presented to G.I. Lieftinck. 2: Varia Codicologica. (Amsterdam, 1972). Litterae Textuales, 2.
- (with J. van Biezen). Two Chansonniers from the Low Countries: French and Dutch Polyphonic Songs from the Leiden and Utrecht Fragments (Early 15th Century). (Amsterdam, 1985). Monumenta Musica Neerlandica, 15.

Book chapters and articles

- “Codicological Units: Towards a Terminology for the Stratigraphy of the Non-Homogeneous Codex”. Signo e Testo 2 (2004): 17–42.
- “The Pen and Its Movement: Some General and Less General Remarks”. Gazette du Livre Médiéval 40 (2002): 14–24.
- “Skins, Sheets, and Quires”. In: New Directions in Later Medieval Manuscript Studies. Essays from the 1998 Harvard Conference. Ed. Derek Pearsall (York, 2000), pp. 81–90.
- “Writing and Dating—Some General Remarks”. Scriptorium 54 (2000): 5–8.
- “The Layout of the Bible Gloss in Manuscript and Early Print”. In: The Bible as Book. The First Printed Editions. Ed. Paul Saenger and Kimberly van Kampen (London, 1999), pp. 7–13.
- “The Speed of Scribes”. In: Scribi e Colofoni. Le Sottoscrizioni di Copisti dalle Origini all’Avvento della Stampa. Atti del Seminario di Erice, X Colloquio del Comité International de Paléographie Latine (23–28 Ottobre 1993). Ed. A. Condello and G. de Gregorio (Spoleto 1995), pp. 57–69. Biblioteca del Centro per il Collegamento degli Studi Medievali e Umanistici in Umbria, 14.
- “Sizes and Formats”. In: Ancient and Medieval Book Materials and Techniques. Vol. 1. Ed. Marilena Maniaci and Paola F. Munafò (Città de Vaticano 1993), pp. 227–273. Studi e Testi, 357.
- “‘Typography’ in the Manuscript Book”. Journal of the Printing Historical Society 22 (1993): 5–28.
- “Ruling by Rake and Board: Notes on Some Late Medieval Ruling Techniques”. In: The Role of the Book in Medieval Culture: Proceedings of the Oxford International Symposium, 16 September–1 October 1982. Ed. Peter Ganz (Turnhout 1986), pp. 41–54. Bibliologia 3.
- (with P.M. Vermeer). “An Unusual Yogh in the Bestiary Manuscript — A Palaeographical Note”. Medium Ævum 40 (1971): 56–57.
