= Byzantine battle tactics =

Military strategy

The Byzantine army evolved from that of the late Roman period taking as leading models and shaping itself on the late Hellenistic armies, but it became considerably more sophisticated in strategy, tactics and organization. The language of the army was still Latin, although later (especially after the 6th century) Greek dominated, as it became the official language of the entire empire. Unlike the Roman legions, its strength was in its cavalry, especially the armoured cataphracts, which evolved from the clibanarii of the late empire. Infantry were still used but mainly as a base of maneuver for the cavalry, as well as in specialized roles. Most of the foot-soldiers of the empire were the armoured skutatoi and later on, kontarioi (plural of the singular kontarios), with the remainder being the light infantry and archers of the psiloi. The Byzantines valued intelligence and discipline in their soldiers far more than bravery or brawn. The "Ρωμαίοι στρατιώται" (rōmaíoi stratiōtai) were a loyal force composed of citizens willing to fight to defend their homes and their state to the death, augmented by mercenaries. The training was very much like that of the legionaries, with the soldiers taught close combat techniques with their swords, spears and axes, along with the extensive practice of archery.

== Structural history ==
As the Byzantine empire's borders changed, so did its military structure.

Over the course of its long history, the armies of Byzantium were reformed and reorganized many times. The only constants in its structure were its complexity and high levels of professionalism. During the 6th and 7th centuries, Hellenistic political systems, philosophies and eastern theocratic Orthodox doctrines, had forced a greater simplification in the estate administration that aimed to exercise the emperor's power in more direct means through his different viceroys in which civic and military powers would be personified in single entities with definitive powers over their respective governorships, these being the various Byzantine, Strategos, Exarchs, Doux, Katepanos among others. The main characteristics of a Theme were those of a constant source of income through the towns and villages of rural communities and large urban centers of Asia minor which allowed a simple management and great military flexibility with the ability to allow each governor general to rapidly create provincial armies when needed.

Despite having the same late Roman roots, the Byzantine army shape and reform itself on the various late Hellenistic treatises of war well known in the eastern Mediterranean, mainly Arrian and Onosander. Despite its classical bias, it was not a simple imitation of antiquity and it differed in several notable ways: It had greater numbers of heavier cavalry, archers and other missile troops, and fewer Foederati. These differences may have been contributing factors to the eastern empire's survival. It was with this Eastern Roman army that much of the western empire was reconquered in the campaigns of the generals Belisarius and Narses. It was during this time, under Justinian I, that the revitalized empire reached its greatest territorial extent and the army its greatest size of over 330,000 men by 540. Later, under the general and emperor Heraclius, the Sassanid Empire of Persia was finally defeated.

Late in Heraclius' reign, however, a major new threat suddenly arose to the empire's security in the form of the Saracens. Spurred on by their new religion, Islam, which demanded the subjugation of the world or its conversion to dar al-Islam, and driven by a still-strong tribal warfare mentality. Under the leadership of Khalid ibn al-Walid these invaders rapidly overran many of the empire's wealthiest and most important regions, especially Syria, the Levant and Egypt. This new challenge, which seriously threatened the empire's survival, compelled Heraclius and his immediate successors, in the mid-7th century, to undertake a major reform of the Byzantine military system to provide for a more cost effective local defense of its Anatolian heartland. The result was the theme system, which served as both administrative and military divisions, each under the command of a military governor or strategos.

The theme was a division-sized unit of around 9,600, stationed in the theme (administrative district) in which it was raised and named for. The themes were not simply garrison troops, however, but mobile field forces capable of supporting neighboring themes in defensive operations, or joining together to form the backbone of an imperial expeditionary force for offensive campaigns. It was under this new system that the Byzantine army is generally considered to have come into its own, distinct from its late-imperial Roman precursor. The thematic system proved to be both highly resilient and flexible, serving the empire well from the mid-7th through the late 11th centuries. Not only did it hold back the Saracens, but some of Byzantium's lost lands were recaptured. The thematic armies also vanquished many other foes including the Bulgars, Avars, Slavs and Varangians, some of whom eventually ended up in the service of Constantinople as allies or mercenaries.

In addition to the themes, there was also the central imperial army stationed in and near Constantinople called the Tagmata. The tagmata were originally battalion-sized units of guards and elite troops who protected the emperors and defended the capital. Over time, though, their size increased to that of regiments and brigades, and more of these units were formed. The term thus became synonymous with the central field army. Due to growing military pressures together with the empire's shrinking economic and manpower base, the themes began to decline. As they did so, the size and importance of the tagmata increased, due also to growing fears of the emperors over the potential dangers the strategoi and their themes posed to their power.

The final, fatal blow to the thematic army occurred in the aftermath of the disaster at the Battle of Manzikert in 1071, when a new enemy, the Seljuk Turks, overran most of Asia Minor along with most of the empire's themes. Once again, the empire was forced to adapt to a new strategic reality with reduced borders and resources. Under Emperor Alexios I Komnenos the themes were restructured around the tagmata, some of which were stationed in the provinces, but the majority usually remained near Constantinople when not on campaign. Tagmata would henceforth take on yet a third meaning as a generic term for a standing military unit of regimental size or larger.

This tagmatic army, which includes those of the Komnenian and Palaiologan dynasties, would serve the empire in its final stages from the late 11th to the mid-15th centuries, a period longer than the entire lifespans of many other empires. The tagmatic armies would also prove resilient and flexible, even surviving the near destruction of the empire in the aftermath of the fall of Constantinople to the Fourth Crusade in 1204. They would eventually retake the capital for Emperor Michael VIII Palaiologos in 1261, and though reduced by then to a small force, barely exceeding 20,000 men at most, would continue to defend the empire ably until the fall of Constantinople to the Ottoman Turks in 1453. In no small part due to increased reliance on mercenaries from the Latin west, the later tagmatic armies would come to resemble those of western Europe at the time, more than their Roman, Greek or Near-Eastern antecedents.

== Infantry ==
=== Infantry types and equipment ===
==== Skoutatoi ====
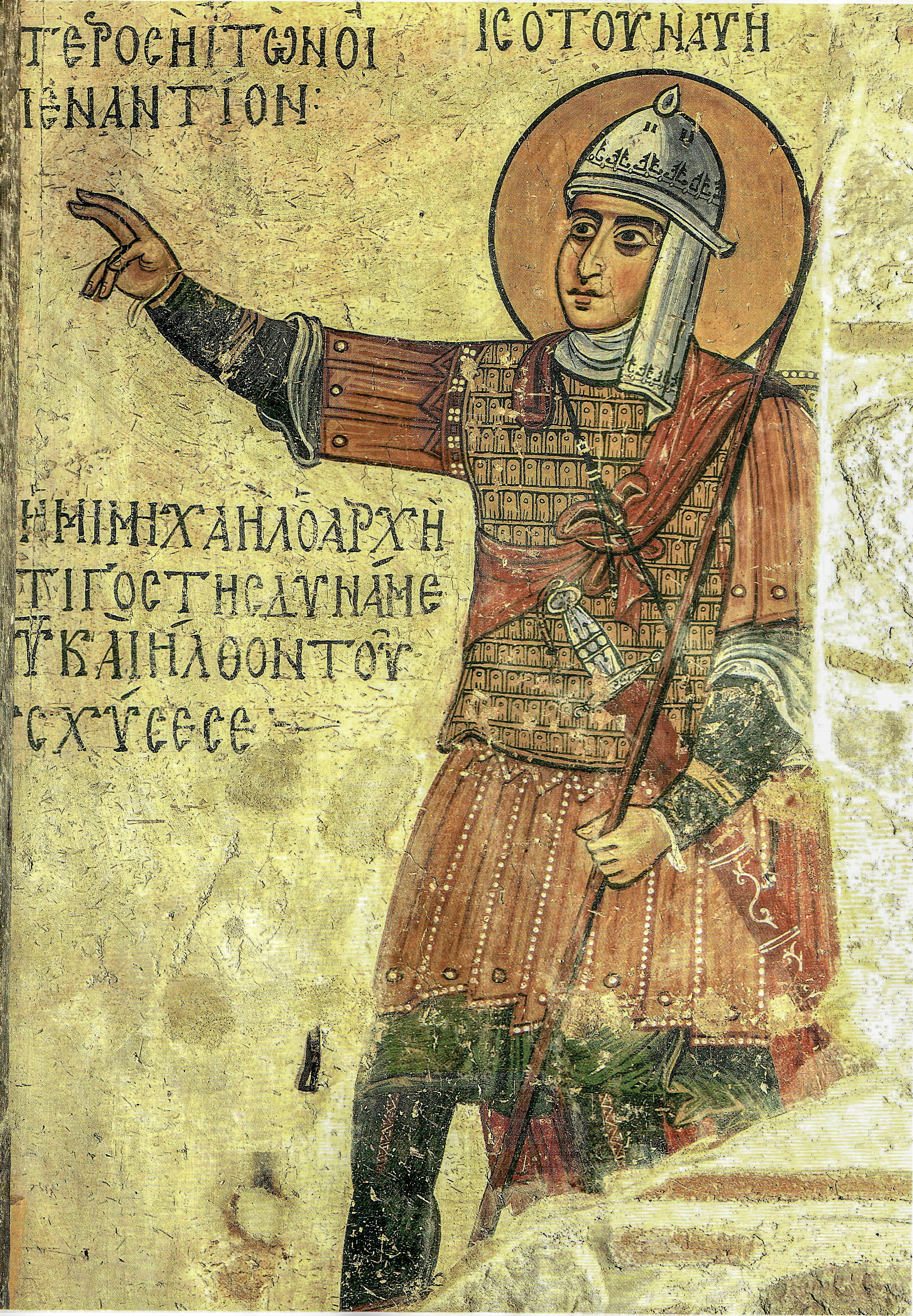
12th-century fresco of Joshua from the monastery of Hosios Loukas. It accurately depicts the typical equipment of a heavily armed Byzantine infantryman of the 10th-12th centuries reassembling earlier Hellenistic militaristic patterns of the Eastern mediterranean. He wears a helmet, lamellar klivanion with pteruges and is armed with a kontarion and a spathion.

The bulk of the Byzantine infantry were the skoutatoi (hoplite), named after the skouton, a large oval, round or kite-shaped shield. Their armor and weapons were modelled following ancient Seleucid and Hellenistic infantry equipment and patterns, which included:

- Helmet: the helmet varied by region and time but was generally a simple, conical-shaped piece of steel, often with extra neck protection in the form of a mail aventail or padded coif.
- lōrikion (λωρίκιον): a mail or scale hauberk.
- klivanion (κλιβάνιον): Often associated with the characteristic Byzantine lamellar cuirass, it also referred to body armor in general. In addition, pteruges (hanging leather strips) were often attached to protect the hips and thighs.
- epilōrikion (επιλωρίκιον): A padded leather or textile over-garment, worn over the cuirass.
- kavadion (καβάδιον) or vamvakion (βαμβάκιον): A padded linen or wool under-armor, worn under the cuirass.
- kremesmata: A heavy textile skirt hanging below a soldier's cuirass.
- kontarion (κοντάριον): a long spear (varied between 2.4 to 4 m (7.9 to 13.1 ft) in length), the kontarion was used by the first ranks of each chiliarchia (battalion) in order to form a defensive Macedonian like pike wall.
- skouton (σκούτον): a large oval, round (later kite-shaped) shield made of wood, covered by linen or leather and edged with rawhide, with a steel boss in earlier periods.
- spathion (σπαθίον): The typical Roman spatha, a single handed sword (about 70 to 80 cm (2.3 to 2.6 ft) in length, depending on the period) based on early Greek and Celtic type of swords; double-edged and weighing up to 1.6 kg (3.5 lb). Later it referred to the medieval arming sword, usually with a crossguard curving back towards the handle.
- paramērion (παραμήριον): a one-edged sabre-like sword, girded at the waist.

Each unit had a different shield decoration often depicting earlier Hellenistic and contemporary Christian motifs. Unarmoured light infantrymen, often armed with javelins, were known as in Greek classical times as peltastoi and psiloi.

==== Toxotai and Psiloi ====
Like in earlier Greek states these composed the standard light infantry of the empire, in each chiliarchia they made up the last three lines. These soldiers, highly trained in the art of bow were formidable archers and highly mobile units. Most of the Imperial archers came from Asia Minor, especially the region around Trebizond on the Black sea, where they were raised, trained and equipped.

Their equipment included:

- Composite bow
- kavadion
- spathion or tzikourion (small axe) for self-defence.

Although military manuals prescribed the use of light armour for archers, cost and mobility considerations would have prohibited wide-scale implementation of this.

==== Varangians ====
The Varangian Guard was a foreign mercenary force and the elite of the Byzantine infantry. It was composed principally of Norsemens, Nordic, Slavic and Germanic people, after 1066 it was increasingly English in composition. The Varangians served as the bodyguard (escort) of the emperor since the time of Basil II, and were generally considered to be well-disciplined and loyal so long as funds remained to pay them. Although most of them brought their weapons with them when entering the Emperor's service, they did gradually adopt Byzantine military dress and equipment. Their most characteristic weapon was a heavy axe, hence their designation as pelekyphoros phroura, the "axe-bearing guard".

=== Infantry organization and formation ===
Byzantine formations were adopted out of the earlier late Hellenistic armies, which applied the late Macedonian and Seleucid phalanx often called chiliarchiai, from the Greek chilia meaning thousand, because they had about 1000 fighting men. A chiliarchy was generally made up of 650 skutatoi and 350 toxotai. The skutatoi formed a line of 15-20 ranks deep, in close order shoulder to shoulder. The first line was called the kontarion, the first four lines were made up of skutatoi the remaining three of toxotai. Three or four chiliarchiai formed a tagma (brigade) in the later empire (after 750 AD) but chiliarchy-sized units were used throughout the empire's life.

The chiliarciai were deployed facing the enemy, with the cavalry on their wings. The infantry would counter-march to make a refused center, while the cavalry would hold or advance to envelop or outflank the enemy. This was similar to the tactic Hannibal employed at Cannae.

The chiliarciai were deployed not in the classic Roman checkered Quincunx pattern but in a Hellenistic long line with enveloping flanks. Each chiliarchy could assume different battle formations depending on the situation, the most common of these were:

- Line formation or phalanx, usually 8 men deep, which was generally used against other infantry or to repel a cavalry charge;
- Wedge, used to break the enemy's lines;
- Foulkon, similar to the Roman testudo or Scandinavian shield wall, used to defend against heavy enemy missile fire
- Parentaxis, classical Greek phalanx with 4 ranks of armoured infantry in close order in the front, 4 ranks of armoured infantry in close order at the back and 4 ranks of archers in between.

=== Infantry tactics and strategies ===
Although the Byzantines developed highly sophisticated infantry tactics, the main work of battle was done by cavalry. The infantry still played an important role when the empire needed to demonstrate its strength. In fact many battles, throughout Byzantine history, began with a frontal assault by the skutatoi with support from the horse archer units known as Hippo-toxotai Equites Sagittarii).

During these assaults the infantry was deployed in the center, that consisted of two chiliarchiai in wedge formation to break enemy's line, flanked by two more chilarchiai in a "refused wing formation" to protect the center and envelop the enemy. This was the tactic used by Nicephorus Phocas against the Bulgars in 967.

Each charge was supported by toxotai that left the formation and preceded the skutatoi in order to provide missile fire. Often, while the infantry engaged their enemy counterparts, the Clibanophori would destroy the enemy's cavalry (this tactic was used mainly against Franks, Lombards or other Germanic tribes who deployed armoured cavalry).

Byzantine infantry were trained to operate with cavalry and to exploit any gaps created by the cavalry.

An effective but risky tactic was to send a chiliarchia to seize and defend a high position, such as the top of a hill as a diversion, while the Cataphracts or Clibanophoroi, supported by the reserve infantry, enveloped the enemy's flank.

The infantry was often placed in advanced positions in front of the cavalry. At the command aperire spatia, the infantry would open a gap in their lines for the cavalry to charge through.

== Cavalry ==
=== Cavalry types and equipment ===
==== Kataphraktoi ====
The cataphract was an armoured cavalry horse archer and lancer who symbolized the power of Constantinople in much the same way as the legionary represented the might of Rome.

The cataphract wore a conical-shaped helmet, topped with a tuft of horsehair dyed in his unit's colour. The helmet was often complemented by mail armour as an aventail to protect the throat, neck and shoulders, which could also cover part or all of the face. He wore a hauberk of doubled-layered mail or scale armour, which extended down to the knees. Over the hauberk, he would also wear a lamellar cuirass that could have sleeves or not. Leather boots or greaves protected his lower legs, while gauntlets protected his hands. He carried a small, round shield, the thyreos, bearing his unit's colours and insignia strapped to his left arm, leaving both hands free to use his weapons and control his horse. Over his mail shirt he wore a surcoat of lightweight cotton and a heavy cloak, both of which were also dyed in unit colours. The horses often wore barding of mail or scale armour with surcoats.

The cataphract's weapons included:

- Composite bow: Same as that carried by the Toxotai.
- Kontarion: or lance, slightly shorter and less thick than that used by the skutatoi which could also be thrown like a pilum.
- Spathion: Also identical to the infantry weapon.
- Dagger: Sometimes referred to as a "Machaira"
- Battle axe: Usually strapped to the saddle as a backup weapon and tool.
- Vamvakion: Same as that of the infantry but with a leather corselet usually depicted in red.

The lance was topped by a small flag or pennant of the same colour as helmet tuft, surcoat, shield and cloak. When not in use the lance was placed in a saddle boot, much like the carbines of later cavalrymen. The bow was slung from the saddle, from which also was hung its quiver of arrows. Later Byzantine saddles, which included stirrups (adopted from the Avars), were an improvement over earlier Roman and Greek cavalry, who had used the four horned saddle without stirrups. The Byzantine state also made horse breeding a priority for the Empire's security. If they could not breed enough high quality mounts, they would purchase them from other cultures.

The catafracti were cavalry regiments heavily armored riders and horses who fought in deployed column orders most effective against enemy infantry. Meanwhile, Clibanarii were also heavily armored horsemen, but were used primarily against cavalry. They employed a spear and shield and the horse’s armor was changed from plate to leather, most often fighting in a wedge formation.

==== Light Cavalry ====
The Byzantines fielded various types of light cavalry to complement the kataphraktoi, in much the same way as the Hellenistic kingdoms employed auxiliary light infantry to support their heavily armored phalangites. Due to the empire's long experience, they were wary of relying too much upon foreign auxiliaries or mercenaries (with the notable exception of the Varangian Guard). Imperial armies usually comprised mainly citizens and loyal subjects. The decline of the Byzantine military during the 11th century is parallel to the decline of the peasant-soldier, which led to the increased use of unreliable mercenaries.

Light cavalry were primarily used for scouting, skirmishing and screening against enemy scouts and skirmishers. They were also useful for chasing enemy light cavalry, who were too fast for the Cataphracts. Light cavalry were more specialized than the Cataphracts, being either archers and horse slingers (psiloi hippeutes) or lancers and mounted javelineers. The types of light cavalry used, their weapons, armour and equipment and their origins, varied depending upon the time and circumstances. In the 10th century military treatise On Skirmishing explicit mention is made of Expilatores, a Latin word which meant "robber" or "plunderer" but which is used to define a type of mounted scout or light raider. Also mentioned in descriptions of army- or thematic-level light cavalry are trapezites, "those whom the Armenians call tasinarioi", who "should be sent out constantly to charge down on the lands of the enemy, cause harm and ravage them." Indeed, the word tasinarioi may be the linguistic ancestor to the modern word Hussar.

If the need for light cavalry became great enough, Constantinople would raise additional Toxotai, provide them with mounts and train them as Hippo-toxotai. When they did employ foreign light horsemen, the Byzantines preferred to recruit from steppe nomad tribes such as the Sarmatians, Scythians, Pechenegs, Khazars or Cumans. On occasion, they recruited from their enemies, such as the Bulgars, Avars, Magyars or Seljuk Turks. The Armenians were also noted for their light horsemen, the tasinarioi.

=== Cavalry organization and formations ===
The Byzantine cavalrymen and their horses were superbly trained and capable of performing complex manoeuvres. While a proportion of the cataphracts appear to have been lancers or archers only, most had bows and lances. Their main tactical units were the numerus (also called at times arithmos or banda) of 300-400 men. The equivalent to the old Roman cohort or the modern battalion, the Numeri were usually formed in lines 8 to 10 ranks deep, making them almost a mounted phalanx. The Byzantines recognized that this formation was less flexible for cavalry than infantry but found the trade off to be acceptable in exchange for the greater physical and psychological advantages offered by depth.

In the 10th century military treatise attributed to Emperor Nikephoros II, On Skirmishing, it is stated that the cavalry army of any mobile army commanded by the emperor must be of at least 8,200 riders, not including 1,000 household cavalry—that is, the force belonging personally to the Emperor. These 8,200 horse ought to be divided "into 24 units of up to three hundred men each. These twenty-four units, in turn, just as with the infantry, should make up four groupings of equal strength, each with six combat units." In such an organisation, the author of On Skirmishing argues, the army can proceed on the march with these units "covering the four directions, front rear and the sides." So important was a large number of cavalry for operations against the Arabs that "if the cavalry army should end up with an even smaller number [than 8,000 horse], the emperor must not set out on campaign with such a small number."

When the Byzantines had to make a frontal assault against a strong infantry position, the wedge was their preferred formation for charges. The Cataphract Numerus formed a wedge of around 400 men in 8 to 10 progressively larger ranks. The first three ranks were armed with lances and bows, the remainder with lance and shield. The first rank consisted of 25 soldiers, the second of 30, the third of 35 and the remainder of 40, 50, 60 etc. adding ten men per rank. When charging the enemy, the first three ranks shot arrows to create a gap in the enemy's formation then at about 100 to 200 meters from the foe the first ranks shifted to their kontarion lances, charging the line at full speed followed by the remainder of the battalion. Often these charges ended with the enemy infantry routed, at this point infantry would advance to secure the area and allow the cavalry to briefly rest and reorganize.

=== Cavalry tactics and strategies ===
As with the infantry, the Cataphracts adapted their tactics and equipment out of earlier Hellenistic treatises of war however this could variate in relation to which enemy they were fighting. In the standard deployment, four Numeri would be placed around the infantry lines. One on each flank with one on the right rear and another on the left rear. Thus the cavalry Numeri were not only the flank protection and envelopment elements but the main reserve and rear guard to protect the population and the Emperor.

The Byzantines usually preferred using the cavalry for flanking and envelopment attacks, instead of frontal assaults and almost always preceded and supported their charges with arrow fire. The front ranks of the numeri would draw bows and fire on the enemy's front ranks, then once the foe had been sufficiently weakened would draw their lances and charge. The back ranks would follow, drawing their bows and firing ahead as they rode. This combination of missile fire with shock action put their opponents at a grave disadvantage - If they closed ranks to better resist the charging lances, they would make themselves more vulnerable to the bows' fire, if they spread out to avoid the arrows the lancers would have a much easier job of breaking their thinned ranks. Many times the arrow fire and start of a charge were enough to cause the enemy to run without the need to close or melee.

A favorite tactic when confronted by a strong enemy cavalry force involved a feigned retreat and ambush. The Numeri on the flanks would charge at the enemy horsemen, then draw their bows turn around and fire as they withdrew (the Parthian Shot). If the enemy horse did not give chase, they would continue harassing them with arrows until they did. Meanwhile, the Numeri on the left and right rear would be drawn up in their standard formation facing the flanks and ready to attack the pursuing enemy as they crossed their lines. The foes would be forced to stop and fight this unexpected threat but as they did the flanking Numeri would halt their retreat, turn around and charge at full speed into their former pursuers. The enemy, weakened, winded and caught in a vice between two mounted phalanxes would break with the Numeri they once pursued now chasing them. Then the rear Numeri, who had ambushed the enemy horse, would move up and attack the unprotected flanks in a double envelopment. This tactic is similar to what Julius Caesar did at Pharsalus in 48 BC when his allied cavalry acted as bait to lure the superior horse of Pompey into an ambush by the six elite cohorts of his reserve "Fourth line". The Arab and Mongol cavalries would also use variations of it later to great effect when confronted by larger and more heavily armed mounted foes.

When facing opponents such as the Vandals or the Avars with strong armoured cavalry, the cavalry were deployed behind the armoured infantry who were sent ahead to engage the enemy. The infantry would attempt to open a gap in the enemy formation for the cavalry to charge through.

== Byzantine Art of War ==
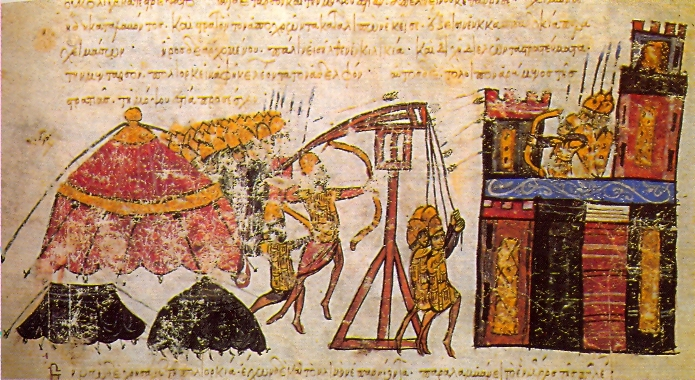
A siege by Byzantine forces, Skylintzes chronicle 11th century

Centuries of warfare enabled the Byzantines to write their own treatises on the protocols of war which eventually contained strategies for dealing with traditional enemies of the state. These manuals enabled the wisdom of prior generations to find its way within newer generations of strategists.

One such manual, the famous Tactica by Leo VI the Wise, provides instructions for dealing with various foes such as:

- The Lombards and the Franks (the latter name was used to designate West Europeans in general) were defined as armoured cavalry which in a direct charge, could devastate an opponent. It was therefore advised to avoid a pitched battle against them. However the textbook remarks that they fought with no discipline, little to no battle order and generally had few if any of their horsemen performing reconnaissance ahead of the army. They also failed to fortify their camps at night.

The Byzantine general was hence advised to best fight such an opponent in a series of ambushes and night attacks. If it came to battle he should pretend to flee, drawing the knights to charge his retreating army - only to run into an ambush. It was also suggested that the Byzantine general should prolong the campaign and lure the enemy into desolate areas where an army could not live off the land, thus causing the "Frankish" army with its primitive logistics to fracture into many small foraging parties who could then be defeated in detail.

- The Magyars and Pechenegs were known to fight as bands of light horsemen, armed with bow, javelin and scimitar as well as being accomplished in ambush and the use of horsemen to scout ahead of the army. In battle they advanced in small scattered bands which would harass the front line of the army, charging only if they discovered a weak point.

The general was counselled to deploy his infantry archers in the front line. Their larger bows had greater range than that of the horsemen and could so keep them at a distance. Once the Turks, harassed by the arrows of the Byzantine archers, tried to close into range of their bows, the Byzantine armoured cavalry would ride them down. Since nomads were known to employ the feigned flight stratagem the general was also cautioned against rash pursuit which could lead his army into ambushes. In a pitched battle he was advised to if possible anchor his position to rivers, ravines or marshes so as to preclude sudden rear or flank attacks by the highly mobile nomads. Last, if undertaking offensive operations, he was urged to do so in late winter and early spring when the nomad's horses were at their worst form after many months of little grass to eat.

- The Slavic Tribes, such as the Serbians, Slovenes and Croatians still fought as foot soldiers. However, the craggy and mountainous terrain of the Balkans lent itself to ambushes by archers and spearmen from above, where an army could be confined in a steep valley.

Invasion into their territories was consequently discouraged, though if necessary, it was recommended that extensive scouting was to be undertaken in order to avoid ambushes; and that such forays were best undertaken in winter, where the snow could reveal the tribesmen tracks and frozen ice provide a secure path to otherwise difficult to reach marsh settlements. When hunting Slavic raiding parties or meeting an army in the field, it was pointed out that the tribesmen fought with round shields and little or no protective armour. Thus their infantry should be easily overpowered by a charge of armoured cavalry.

- The Saracens were judged as the most dangerous of all foes, as remarked by Leo VI: "Of all our foes, they have been the most judicious in adapting our practices and arts of war, and are thus the most dangerous." Where they had in earlier centuries been powered by religious fervour, by Leo VI's reign (886-912) they had adopted some of the weaponry and tactics of the Byzantine army. Saracen infantry on the other hand was deemed by Leo VI to be little more than a rabble who lightly armed, could not match the Byzantine infantry. While the Saracen cavalry was judged to be a fine force it lacked the discipline and organisation of the Byzantines, who with a combination of horse archer and armoured cavalry proved a deadly mix to the light Saracen cavalry.

Defeats beyond the mountain passes of the Taurus led the Saracens to concentrate on raiding and plundering expeditions instead of seeking permanent conquest. Forcing their way through a pass, their horsemen would charge into the lands at an incredible speed.
The Byzantine general was to immediately collect a force of cavalry from the nearest themes and to shadow the invading Saracen army. Such a force might have been too small to seriously challenge the invaders but it would deter detachments of plunderers from breaking away from the main army. Meanwhile the main Byzantine army was to be gathered from all around Asia Minor and to meet the invasion force on the battlefield. Another tactic was to cut off their retreat across the passes. Byzantine infantry was to reinforce the garrisons in the fortresses guarding the passes and the cavalry to pursue the invader, driving them up into the valley so as to press the enemy into narrow valleys with little to no room to manoeuvre and from which they became easy prey to Byzantine archers. A third tactic was to launch a counter attack into Saracen territory as an invading Saracen force would often turn around to defend its borders should a message of an attack reach it.
It was later added, in Nicephorus Phocas's military manual, that should the Saracen force only be caught up to by the time it was retreating laden with plunder then that the army's infantry should set upon them at night from three sides, leaving the only escape the road back to their land. It was deemed most likely that the startled Saracens would in all speed retreat rather than stay and fight to defend their plunder.

== See also ==
- Byzantine army
- Byzantine navy
- Byzantine bureaucracy
- Byzantine military manuals
- Komnenian army
