= Alphonse Dain =

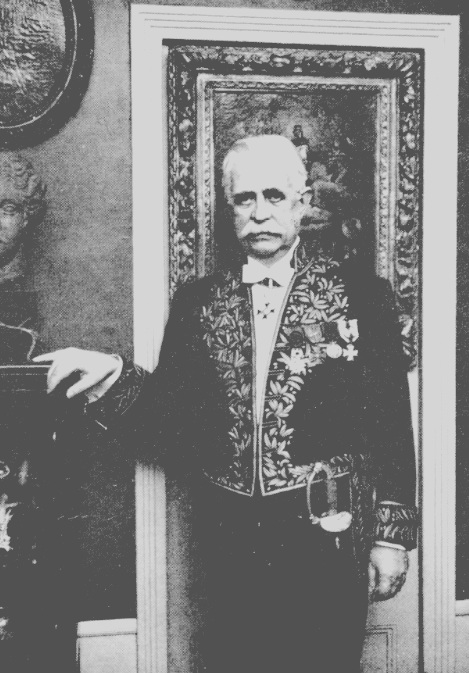
Alphonse Dain

Marie-Alphonse Dain (better known as Alphonse Dain) was a French Hellenist and Byzantinist. He was born 3 April 1896 at Chavignon (Aisne) and died 10 July 1964 in Paris. He was a major figure in the field of Greek codicology and palaeography and a pioneer of modern scholarship on Byzantine military texts.

== Career ==
Dain’s academic studies were initially delayed by his service in the French Air Force during the First World War, which earned him the Croix de Guerre. He attended the École du Louvre (1922-1924), where he was a student of Paul Mazon and Edmond Pottier, and was certified in Letters in 1926. He was successively Greek Assistant (1922), Professor of Greek Letters (1938) and Dean of the Faculty of Letters (1954-1964) of the Institut Catholique de Paris. He was also Lecturer (1932) and Director of Studies (1942) of Greek Palaeography at the École pratique des hautes études. He became a Doctor of Letters in 1946, with a thesis concerning the textual history of Aelian the Tactician. During the Second World War, his active participation in the Resistance earned him the French Médaille de la Résistance. He was an officer of the Légion d'honneur in a military capacity.

Since his youth a member of the Association des Études grecques and the Société des Études latines, he served on the board of these societies and as president in 1949 and 1956. He also joined the Association Guillaume Budé, of which he was Secretary, then Vice-President. As Director of the Collection des Universités de France from 1954 to 1964, he introduced a more rigorous scientific approach to the editing of Greek and Latin texts, which made this series of edition-translations a standard reference collection. He was Executive Secretary of the International Association of Byzantine Studies from 1949 to 1962. He was also Director of the Catalogue of Greek Manuscripts of the Bibliothèque nationale de France and Member of the Conseil supérieur de l'Éducation nationale. In 1962 he was elected membre libre résidant of the Académie des inscriptions et belles-lettres.

Devoting his studies in particular to Greek palaeography and codicology, he is considered one of the founders of the modern disciplines in France. His publications were especially concerned with the textual histories and manuscript transmission of Greek military writers and of Byzantine legal texts. He also published manuals of Ancient Greek language and verse metre.

== Selected publications (books) ==
- Les manuscrits d'Onésandros (1930)
- Inscriptions grecques du Musée du Louvre. Les textes inédits (1933)
- La tradition du texte d'Héron de Byzance (1933)
- Léon VI le Sage Problemata (1935)
- Inscriptions grecques du musée du Bardo (1936)
- La «Tactique» de Nicéphore Ouranos (1937)
- Sylloge Tacticorum quæ olim «inedita Leonis tactica» dicebatur (1938)
- Anthologie grecque, vol. IV et VII (1938, 1957) (with P. Waltz, A.-M. Desrousseaux and G. Soury)
- Le «Corpus perditum» (1939)
- La collection florentine des tacticiens grecs (1940)
- Leçon sur la stylistique grecque (1941)
- L'«Extrait tactique» tiré de Léon VI le Sage (1942)
- Naumachica, partim adhuc inedita (1943)
- Les «Novelles» de Léon VI le Sage (1944) (with P. Noailles)
- Leçon sur la métrique grecque (1944);
- Histoire du texte d'Élien le Tacticien, des origines à la fin du Moyen Âge (1946)
- Les manuscrits (1949)
- Les types de phrase en grec (1952)
- Grammaire grecque (1952) (with J. de Foucault et P. Poulain)
- Le «Philétæros» attribué à Hérodien (1954)
- Tragédies de Sophocle, I: Les Trachiniennes, Antigone (1955); II: Ajax, Œdipe Roi, Électre (1958); III: Philoctète, Œdipe à Colone (1960)
- Précis de morphologie grecque (1957) (with J. de Foucault et P. Poulain);
- Traité de métrique grecque (posthumous, 1965)
- Le «Poliorcétique » d'Énée le Tacticien (posthumous, 1967)
