= Erik Kwakkel =

Dutch scholar

Prof. dr. Erik Kwakkel
- Born: Frederik Kwakkel; 28 May 1970; Meppel, Netherlands
- Occupation: Palaeographer

Academic background
- Education: Leiden University
- Doctoral advisor: J. P. Gumbert

Academic work
- Discipline: Palaeography, codicology
- Institutions: Leiden University, University of Victoria, University of British Columbia

Erik Kwakkel (born 28 May 1970, Meppel) is a Dutch scholar who specializes in medieval manuscripts, paleography, and codicology. He is a member of the Comité International de Paléographie Latine and, from 2012 through 2017, was a member of the Young Academy of the Royal Netherlands Academy of Arts and Sciences (KNAW).

Following completion of his M.A. in Middle Dutch Literature and Ph.D. in Manuscript Studies at the University of Leiden in the Netherlands, Kwakkel worked at numerous international research institutions, including the University of British Columbia (2003–2005) and the University of Victoria in Canada. Returning to the Netherlands in 2010, he became a professor at his alma mater where, in December 2016, he was appointed Scaliger Chair, succeeding Prof. Harm Beukers, who held the position from 2007. The holder of the chair, affiliated with the Scaliger Institute at Leiden University Libraries as well as with the Faculty of Humanities, is tasked with "promot[ing] teaching and research relating to the Special Collections held by the University library" through outreach activities directed towards academic and non-academic audiences. Kwakkel returned to the University of British Columbia in 2018 after accepting an appointment at the latter institution's iSchool (effective 1 August 2018).

From 2010 through 2015, Kwakkel directed the nationally funded project "Turning Over a New Leaf: Manuscript Innovation in the Twelfth-Century Renaissance" which examined the development of manuscripts "as … physical object[s] during the Twelfth Century Renaissance". In 2014, his work on medieval doodles caught international attention. A year previously, while teaching a class at Leiden University, his class found notes, letters, and receipts from an unidentified court in the Rhine region hidden inside the binding of a book printed in 1577.

Kwakkel has delivered public lectures at numerous venues throughout Europe and North America including the 2014 Triennial E. A. Lowe Lecture in Paleography at Corpus Christi College, Oxford, where he spoke on "The Birth of Gothic Script", the Richard and Mary Rouse History of the Book Lecture, “Not for Keeps: The Ephemeral in Medieval Manuscript Culture” at the University of California, Los Angeles in 2017 and, in February 2020, a Darwin College Lecture on “The Enigmatic Premodern Book”. He is the author of numerous books and articles for both scholarly and lay audiences.

== Selected publications ==
Books as author

- with Francis Newton. Medicine in Monte Cassino: Constantine the African and the Oldest Manuscript of his Liber Pantegni (Brepols, 2019).
- Books before Print. (Arc Humanities Press, 2018).
- with Rosamond McKitterick and Rodney Thomson. Turning Over a New Leaf: Change and Development in the Medieval Book (Leiden University Press, 2012).
- Dit sijn die Dietsche boeke die ons toebehoeren: De kartuizers van Herne en de productie van Middelnederlandse handschriften in de regio Brussel (1350–1400) (Peeters, 2002). Miscellanea Neerlandica 27.

Books as editor

- (ed., with Rodney Thomson) The European Book in the Long Twelfth Century (Cambridge University Press, forthcoming 2018).
- (ed.) Manuscripts of the Latin Classics 800–1200, Studies in Medieval and Renaissance Book Culture (Leiden University Press, 2015).
- (ed.) Writing in Context: Insular Manuscript Culture 500–1200, Studies in Medieval and Renaissance Book Culture (Leiden University Press, 2013).
- (ed., with Stephen Partridge) Author, Reader, Book: Medieval Authorship in Theory and Practice (University of Toronto Press, 2012).

Book chapters and articles

- "Decoding the Material Book: Cultural Residue in Medieval Manuscripts". The Medieval Manuscript Book: Cultural Approaches, ed. Michael Van Dussen and Michael Johnson (Cambridge University Press, 2015).
- "Biting, Kissing and the Treatment of Feet: The Transitional Script of the Long Twelfth Century". Turning Over a New Leaf: Change and Development in the Medieval Book, ed. Erik Kwakkel, Rosamond McKitterick, and Rodney Thomson (Leiden University Press, 2012), 78–126.
- "Commercial Organisation and Economic Innovation". The Production of Books in England, 1350–1530, ed. Alexandra Gillespie and Daniel Wakelin (Cambridge University Press, 2011), 173–191.
- "A New Type of Book for a New Type of Reader: The Emergence of Paper in Vernacular Book Production". The History of the Book in the West: 400–1455, ed. Jane Roberts and Pamela Robinson (Ashgate, 2010), 409–438.
