= G. I. Lieftinck =

Dutch curator and Dutch language specialist (1902-1994)

Gerard Isaäc Lieftinck
- Born: 3 August 1902; Amsterdam, Netherlands
- Died: 9 May 1994 (aged 91); Deventer, Netherlands

Academic background
- Education: University of Amsterdam
- Thesis: De Middelnederlandsche Tauler-Handschriften

Academic work
- Discipline: Palaeography and codicology
- Institutions: Leiden University, University of Amsterdam, Koninklijke Bibliotheek
- Notable students: J. P. Gumbert

Gerard Isaäc Lieftinck (3 August 1902 – 9 May 1994), known in print as G.I. Lieftinck, was a Dutch academic specialising in medieval European manuscripts.

== Personal life ==
The eldest of two boys and three girls, Lieftinck was born in Amsterdam in 1902 to Gerard Lieftinck (1875–1957), an entrepreneur and director of the tobacco brokerage J.H. Lieftinck & Son, and his wife Elisabeth Esser (1878–1963). He married twice, had two sons, and died in Deventer in 1994.

== Education and career ==
From 1920 to 1925 Lieftinck studied medicine at the University of Amsterdam. Thereafter he switched to Dutch literature which remained his focus until he completed his studies in 1931; his first article, about fifteenth century Dutch mystic Hendrik Mande, appeared shortly thereafter. In 1936 Lieftinck successfully defended his doctoral dissertation on the Middle Dutch Tauler manuscripts.

After commencing his career as a volunteer at the library of the School of Economics in Rotterdam, Lieftinck worked at the University of Amsterdam, at Koninklijke Bibliotheek, and at Leiden University, becoming Keeper of Manuscripts at the latter institution in 1942. In 1948 he was appointed Lector in Medieval Manuscripts at Leiden University. The post was upgraded to Professor of Palaeography and Manuscripts in 1963, making him only the second person to teach in that field at Leiden (the first being S.G. de Vries, who held the post from 1909 to 1931). Lieftinck's inaugural lecture at Leiden, Paleografie en Handschriftenkunde (Amsterdam, 1963), outlined “how palaeography, once considered ‘ancilla philologiae’, ha[d] become an autonomous science, and how it ha[d] moved ... towards codicology of the medieval book”. He held the position until his retirement in 1972, whereupon he was succeeded by J. P. Gumbert. Lieftinck participated in the founding of the prestigious CIPL, Comité International de Paléographie Latine, and played an important role in the design and implementation of the Catalog of Dated and Datable Manuscripts, a centrally important resource for codicologists.

A member of knaw, Koninklijke Nederlandse Akademie van Wetenschappen (Royal Netherlands Academy of Arts and Sciences) from 1961, and a foreign member of kvab, Koninklijke Vlaamse Academie van België voor Wetenschappen en Kunsten (Royal Flemish Academy of Belgium for Science and the Arts) from 1964, Lieftinck became his generation's principal authority in all matters relating to the Dutch and Latin manuscripts of the Netherlands. He published dozens of articles and books in Dutch, French, and English on topics in manuscript studies and palaeography. The Free University of Brussels, where he occasionally lectured from 1965 through 1971, awarded him an honorary doctorate in 1959. The first four volumes of the series Litterae Textuales (1: Varia Codicologica; 2: Texts and Manuscripts; 3: Neerlandica Manuscripta; 4: Miniatures, Scripts, Collections) were published in his honour.

== Selected publications ==
Authored books

- (with J. P. Gumbert). Manuscrits Datés Conservés dans les Pays-Bas, Tome Deuxième: Les Manuscrits d'Origine Néerlandaise (XIVe–XVIe Siècles) et Supplément au Tome Premier. (Leiden: Brill, 1988). Catalogue Paléographique des Manuscrits en Écriture Latine Portant des Indications de Date.
- Boekverluchters uit de Omgeving van Marie van Bourgondie c. 1475–c. 1485. 2 Vols. (Brussels: Paleis der Academiën, 1969).
- Manuscrits Datés Conservés dans les Pays-Bas, Tome Premier: Les Manuscrits d'Origine Étrangère (816–c. 1550). (Amsterdam: Noord-Hollandsche Uitgevers Maatschappij, 1964–). Catalogue Paléographique des Manuscrits en Écriture Latine Portant des Indications de Date.
- Mediaeval Manuscripts with ‘Imposed’ Sheets. (Den Haag: Nijhoff, 1961).
- Problemen met Betrekking tot het Zutphens-Groningse Maerlant-handschrift. (Amsterdam: Noord-Hollandsche Uitgevers Maatschappij, 1959).
- De Librijen en Scriptoria der Westvlaamse Cisterciënser-abdijen Ter Duinen en Ter Doest in de 12e en 13e eeuw en de Betrekkingen tot het Atelier van de Kapittelschool van Sint Donatiaan te Brugge. (Brussels: Paleis der Academiën, 1953).
- Bisschop Bernold (1027–1054) en zijn Geschenken aan de Utrechtse Kerken. (Groningen, 1948).
- Codicum in Finibus Belgarum ante Annum 1550 Conscriptorum qui in Bibliotheca Universitatis Asservantur. (Leiden: Brill, 1948). Codices Manuscripti, 5.
- Vertalingen van Nederlandsche Letterkunde na 1880 aanwezig in de Koninklijke Bibliotheek. Foreword by Leendert Brummel. (Den Haag, 1939).
- De Middelnederlandsche Tauler-Handschriften. (1936). [Phil. Diss. Amsterdam].

Edited volumes

- (with B. Bischoff and G. Battelli). Nomenclature des Écritures Livresques du IXe au XVIe Siècle: Premier Colloque International de Paléographie Latine, Paris 28–30 avril 1953. (Paris: Centre National de la Recherche Scientifique, 1954).

Book chapters and articles

- “Kunstwerk of Juweel?: Het Gebedenboek van de heer C.H. Beels te Hilversum”. Nederlands Kunsthistorisch Jaarboek 8 (1957): 1–28.
- “Een Uniek Handschrift met de Middelnederlandse Versie van de Statuten van Het Gulden Vlies van 1431”. Tijdschrift voor Nederlandse Taal- en Letterkunde 67 (1950).
