= Richard and Mary Rouse History of the Book Lectures =

The Richard and Mary Rouse History of the Book Lectures are held annually at the University of California Los Angeles sponsored by the Center for Early Global Studies (formerly the Center for Medieval and Renaissance Studies). Richard H. Rouse and Mary A. Rouse were faculty at the university who helped establish the series. In 2005 and 2011 they donated their collection of medieval and Renaissance manuscripts in Latin and vernacular languages to the UCLA Library Special Collections.

== Richard and Mary Rouse History of the Book Lectures ==
Date	Lecturer	Title of Lecture	Institution
2025	Kristina Richardson	“Between Two Worlds: The Roma and Early Global Print Cultures”	University of Virginia
2024	Ilse Sturkenboom	“On the Introduction of Chinese Decorated Paper to Iran and How it Revolutionized Manuscript Production in the Islamic World”	LMU Munich
2022	Denva Gallant	“Illustrating the Vitae patrum: The Rise of the Eremitic Ideal in Fourteenth-Century Italy”	University of Delaware
2021	Andrea M. Achi	“A Library of Memories: Textual Preservation at the Monastery of St. Michael in Egypt”	The Cloisters at The Metropolitan Museum of Art, New York
2020	Joshua Calhoun	“Hydrophilic Archives: Early Handmade Paper in Unstable Environments”	University of Wisconsin, Madison
2019	Sarah J. Pearce	“‘This is What I Have on My Bookshelf’: Jewish Autobiography and Descriptive Bibliography in the Islamic West”	New York University
2018	Emine Fetvaci	“From Provincial Chronicle to Grand Imperial Manuscript: The Making of the ‘Nusretname'” Boston University	
2017	Erik Kwakkel	“Not for Keeps: The Ephemeral in Medieval Manuscript Culture”	Leiden University
2016	Jessica Brantley	“The Book of Hours in Literary History”	Yale University
2015	Ann Blair	“In the Workshop of the Mind: Amanuenses and Authorship in Early Modern Europe”	Harvard University
2014	Sylvie L. Merian	“Protection Against the Evil Eye? Votive Offerings on Armenian Manuscript Bindings”	The Morgan Library & Museum
2013	Robert Somerville	“Papal Councils, Papal Records, and the First Crusade: the Council of Benevento in 1113”	Columbia University
2012	Kathryn Kerby-Fulton	“The Clerical Proletariat and Manuscript Production in Late Medieval England	University of Notre Dame
2011	John Van Engen	“Scribes at Home: Brothers and Sisters of the Common Life and In-House Books”	University of Notre Dame
2010	Elizabeth Morrison	“Searching for the Origins of Secular Imagery in 13th-Century France”	J. Paul Getty Museum
2008	William Noel	Archimedes in Bits: The Digital Presentation of a Write-Off”	The Walters Art Museum
2008	James Carley	“‘A notable & famous librarie in the Archbishop of Canterburies house’: John Whitgift, Richard Bancroft, and the Foundation of Lambeth Palace Library”	York University, Toronto
2007	Mary Rouse	“Christine de Pizan and the Chapelet des vertus”	University of California, Los Angeles
2007	William Sherman	“The Pointing-Hand: A Pervasive Symbol in the History of Texts”	York University, Toronto
2007	Fr. Justin Sinaites	“The Library of St Catherine’s Monastery, Mount Sinai: A Resource of Continuing Significance”	Saint Catherine's Monastery, Mount Sinai, Egypt
2006	Christopher Page	“Copying Books in a Gradual Fashion, 1025-1125: The Wanderings of Two Monks and the Making of the Western Musical Tradition”	Sidney Sussex College, Cambridge University
2005	Nigel F. Palmer	“Blockbooks and the Fifteenth-Century Media Revolution”	Oxford University
2004	Roger S. Wieck	“Trial by Fleur: The Master of Walters 219 and the Trés Riches Heures”	The Pierpont Morgan Library
2003	Sylvia Huot	“Reading and Meditation in Late Medieval Devotional Manuscripts”	Pembroke College, Cambridge University
2002	Christopher de Hamel	“The Imaginary Library of Archbishop Theodore”	Corpus Christi College, Cambridge University
2001	Peter W. M. Blayney	“England’s First Widow Printer: The Life, Times, and Kin of Elizabeth Pickering Jackson Redmond Cholmeley Cholmeley”	University of Toronto
2000	Myra D. Orth	“French Renaissance Manuscripts: Elegant Survivors”	Getty Research Institute
1998	Jenny Stratford	“John Duke of Bedford (1389-1435): Royal Patron and Collector”	British Museum
1998	Walter Cahn	“The ‘Portrait’ of the Prophet Muhammad in the Toledan Collection”	Yale University
1997	Fr. Leonard E. Boyle, O.P.	“The Vatican Library and the Beginnings of the Printed Book”	Prefect, Biblioteca Apostolica Vaticana
1996	David S. Zeidberg	“Selling Italy’s First Books: The Marketing Strategies of Swynheym and Pannartz”	University of California, Los Angeles
1995	A. R. Braunmuller	“Dead People and Real Places: Fact, Imagination, and Names in Shakespeare’s Plays”	University of California, Los Angeles
1994	Richard H. Rouse	“Geoffrey of St. Leger, Gerard of Montaigu and the Roman de Fauvel”	University of California, Los Angeles
