= Byzantine military manuals =

Treatises on military science produced in the Byzantine Empire

This article lists and briefly discusses the most important of many military treatises on military science produced in the Byzantine Empire.

== Background ==
The Eastern Roman Empire was, for much of its history, one of the major powers of the medieval world. Continuing the institutions of the Roman Empire, throughout its history it was assailed on all sides by various numerically superior enemies. The empire therefore maintained its highly sophisticated military system from antiquity, which relied on discipline, training, knowledge of tactics and a well-organized support system. A crucial element in the maintenance and spreading of this military knowledge, along with traditional histories, were the various treatises and military manuals. These continued a tradition of Greek-Hellenistic warfare and tacticians that stretched back to Xenophon and Aeneas Tacticus, late Hellenistic military manuals adapted and applied for the needs and realities of the Byzantine army, most of them deriving from the wide corpus of ancient Greek and late Hellenistic authors, especially Aelian, Onasander and Polyaenus, and to a lesser extent Aeneas and Arrian. Pioneering scholars in the modern study of Byzantine military manuals include Friedrich Haase (1808-67), Karl Konrad Müller (1854-1903), Rezső (Rudolf) Vári (1867-1940) and Alphonse Dain (1896-1964).

== List of works ==
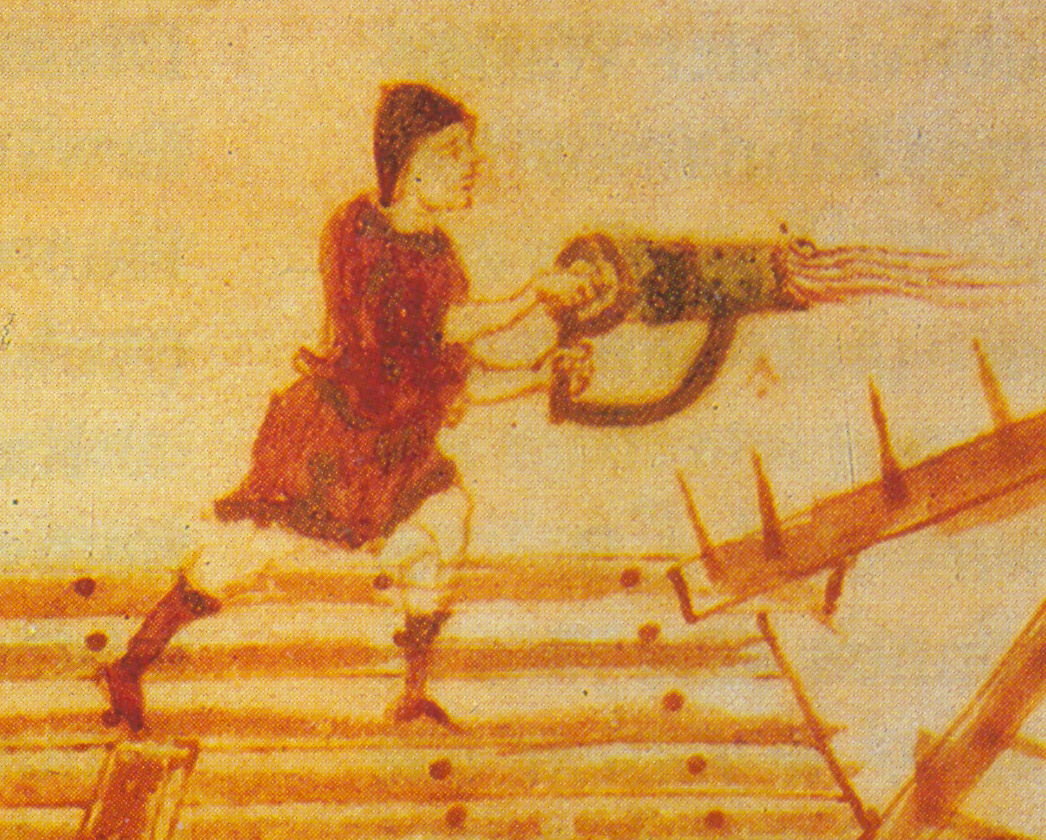
Byzantine hand-siphon for projecting Greek fire, illumination from the Poliorcetica of Hero of Byzantium

A large corpus of Byzantine military literature survives. Characteristically Byzantine manuals were first produced in the sixth century. They greatly proliferated in the tenth century, when the Byzantines embarked on their conquests in the East and the Balkans, but production abated after the early eleventh century. There is some evidence of similar works being written in the Palaiologan era, but with one exception, none survive.

- Urbicius (Οὐρβίκιος) wrote a military pamphlet addressed to Anastasius I (r. 491–518). In the manuscripts it is transmitted as two independent tracts. First, the Tacticon is an epitome of the first part (chs. 1–32) of Arrian’s Ars Tactica (AD 136/7), a conventional treatment of an idealised Hellenistic infantry phalanx. Second, the Epitedeuma (Ἐπιτήδευμα) or 'Invention' is Urbicius’ own design for a type of portable cheval de frise. The attribution to Urbicius of a third work, the so-called ‘Cynegeticus’, is spurious and results from confused scholarship in the 1930s. One manuscript (M) ascribes Maurice’s Strategikon to Urbicius, but this is demonstrably the copyist’s error.
- The "Sixth-Century Byzantine Anonymous" or Anonymus Byzantinus: see below under Syrianus Magister
- The Strategikon attributed to the Emperor Maurice (r. 582–602) was compiled in the late sixth century. It is a large twelve-book compendium treating all aspects of contemporary land warfare. Derives much of its information from the late Hellenistic corpus of Aelian and may have been a complete imitation of the latter, adapted to 6th century needs and realities. The author is especially concerned to clarify procedures for the deployment and tactics of cavalry, particularly in response to Avar victories in the 580s-590s. He favours indirect forms of combat - ambushes, ruses, nocturnal raids and skirmishing on difficult terrain - and he also exhibits a good understanding of military psychology and morale. Book XI offers an innovative analysis of the fighting methods, customs and habitat of the Empire's most significant enemies, as well as recommendations for campaigning north of the Danube against the Slavs, another strategic concern of the 590s. The Strategikon exercised a profound influence upon the subsequent Byzantine genre.
- The so-called De Militari Scientia or "Müller Fragment", an anonymous fragmentary tract, mostly comprising modified excerpts from Maurice's Strategikon. Internal evidence, including the addition of "Saracens" to the list of enemies, suggests a date around the mid-seventh century.
- Syrianus Magister (formerly the "Sixth-Century Byzantine Anonymous" or Anonymus Byzantinus) wrote a large, wide-ranging military compendium employing Aelians and Onosander and to a lesser extent Arrian. Three substantial sections survive, which are transmitted independently in the manuscript tradition and have been edited in separate publications. Scholarship dating as far back as the seventeenth century has consistently recognised the textual unity of these three pieces, but errors in mid twentieth-century studies prolonged their separation. The three components are:
  - a treatise on land warfare under the modern titles Περὶ Στρατηγικῆς or De Re Strategica, most recently published as "The Anonymous Byzantine Treatise on Strategy".
  - a treatise on military oratory under the modern title Rhetorica Militaris, long ascribed to the same "Anonymous".
  - the Naumachia (Ναυμαχίαι), a treatise on naval warfare, which in the unique manuscript bears an ascription to a Syrianus Magister (Ναυμαχίαι Συριανοῦ Μαγίστρου).

Recognition of the common authorship of all three sections necessarily assigns the entire compendium to Syrianus. A new edition of the complete compendium is reportedly in preparation. The constituent parts of the compendium were traditionally dated to the sixth century, but the evidence is weak and all recent studies have identified features incompatible with late antiquity or more congruent with a date of composition in the ninth century. This ninth-century dating has been widely accepted in recent scholarship on the genre.

- The Problemata of the Emperor Leo VI the Wise (r. 886–912), compiled ca. 890s, comprise excerpts of Maurice's Strategikon arranged in a question-and-answer format.
- The Tactica of Leo VI was written ca. 895-908. At its core is a re-edition of Maurice's Strategikon, often reproduced verbatim, and additional material drawn from Hellenistic military treatises, especially Onasander. However, it also includes expansions and modifications to reflect contemporary practice, especially against the Arabs and the Hungarians, as well as chapters on naval warfare (peri naumachias).
- The Sylloge Tacticorum (συλλογὴ τακτικῶν), compiled in the early to mid 10th century, possibly during the reign of Constantine VII. The text is divided into two major sections: the first (chapters 1 to 56) draws upon various earlier authors and provides advice on generalship, battle formations and tactics, and siege warfare. The second half (chapters 57 to 102) deals with stratagems employed by past generals, drawing chiefly from ancient authors. Nevertheless, sections on contemporary warfare and comparison with earlier models (chapters 30-39 and 46-47) are also included, and were used as a basis for the later Praecepta Militaria.
- The so-called "Three Treatises on Imperial Military Expeditions", an appendix to the De Ceremoniis of Emperor Constantine VII.
- The De velitatione bellica (περὶ παραδρομῆς) attributed to Emperor Nikephoros II Phokas (r. 963–969), but actually written on his orders, possibly by his brother Leo. It is an essay on light infantry and skirmishing warfare, written ca. 975 based on Phokas' notes on the cross-border raids and skirmishes between Byzantines and Arabs during the first half of the 10th century. Emphasis is on reconnaissance, the use of the terrain and night fighting, and instructions are provided on various scenarios, from countering raids or large-scale invasions to sieges.
- The Praecepta militaria (στρατηγικὴ ἔκθεσις καὶ σύνταξις Νικηφόρου δεσπότου) of Emperor Nikephoros II Phokas, six chapters written in c. 965, which presents the army of the latter 10th century during the "Byzantine reconquest" in the East. Various operational scenarios are discussed; for a pitched battle, Phokas describes the use of a strong infantry formation that anchors the battle line and the use of heavy cavalry, especially cataphracts, as the main striking force. The text also includes information on the setting up of camps, reconnaissance and the use of spies, as well as the army's religious ceremonies. The chapters are included and partially amended to account for the early 11th-century situation in the later Tactica of Nikephoros Ouranos.
- The Parangelmata Poliorcetica, a manual on siege warfare, by the so-called Hero of Byzantium, focused on the late Hellenistic polyercetics.
- The Tactica of Nikephoros Ouranos, one of the best generals of Basil II, written ca. 1000. It draws upon the Praecepta, Leo VI's Tactica and other works, but also includes chapters from Ouranos' own experience on raiding and sieges.
- The Strategikon of Kekaumenos, written ca. 1075–1078. Not strictly a military manual, it contains general advice in military, administrative and household affairs, often illustrated by examples from 11th century events.
- Enseignemens ou ordenances pour un seigneur qui a guerres et grans gouvernemens a faire (Instructions and Prescriptions for a Lord who has wars to fight and government to exercise) was written by Theodore Palaiologos, Marquess of Montferrat, initially in Greek at Constantinople in the mid-1320s; this Greek text is now lost. Theodore himself translated his work into Latin in the early 1330s; this Latin text is in turn mostly lost. An Old French version (from the Latin) that was produced by Jean de Vignay in the 1340s survives. As Theodore spent most of his life and military career in Montferrat, the text reflects the martial culture of northern Italy rather than Byzantine military traditions.

== Bibliography ==
- Bartusis, Mark C. (1997), The Late Byzantine Army: Arms and Society 1204–1453, University of Pennsylvania Press, ISBN 0-8122-1620-2
- Chatzelis, Georgios. (2019), Byzantine Military Manuals as Literary Works and Practical Handbooks: The Case of the Tenth-Century Sylloge Tacticorum, Routledge, ISBN 9781138596016
- Dennis, George T. (1985). Three Byzantine Military Treatises. Washington DC: Dumbarton Oaks. ISBN 0-88402-140-8.
- Haldon, John (1999). Warfare, State and Society in the Byzantine World, 565–1204. London: UCL Press. ISBN 1-85728-495-X.
- Holmes, Catherine; Waring, Judith (2002). Literacy, Education and Manuscript Transmission in Byzantium and Beyond. BRILL. ISBN 978-90-04-12096-9.
- Kazhdan, Alexander, ed. (1991). The Oxford Dictionary of Byzantium. Oxford and New York: Oxford University Press. ISBN 0-19-504652-8.
- McGeer, Eric (2008). 'Military Texts' in: E. Jeffreys, J. Haldon and R. Cormack (edd.), The Oxford Handbook of Byzantine Studies. Oxford. pp. 907–914.
- Pryor, John H. and Jeffreys, Elizabeth M. (2006). The Age of the ΔΡΟΜΩΝ. The Byzantine Navy ca 500 – 1204 (The Medieval Mediterranean 62). Leiden.
- Rance, Philip (2017). "Maurice's Strategicon and the Ancients: the Late Antique Reception of Aelian and Arrian". In Rance, P.; Sekunda, N.V. (eds.). Greek Taktika. Ancient Military Writing and its Heritage. Gdańsk. pp. 217–255.
- Rance, Philip (2017). 'The Reception of Aineias' Poliorketika in Byzantine Military Literature' in: M. Pretzler and N. Barley (edd.), Brill's Companion to Aineias Tacticus. Leiden/Boston. pp. 290–374.
- Rance, Philip (2018). 'Late Byzantine Elites and Military Literature: Authors, Readers and Manuscripts (11th-15th Centuries)' in: G. Theotokis and A. Yildiz (edd.), A Military History of the Mediterranean Sea – Aspects of War, Diplomacy and Military Elites. Leiden/Boston. pp. 255–286.
- Rance, Philip (2022). 'The Ideal of the Roman General in Byzantium: the Reception of Onasander's Strategikos in Byzantine Military Literature' in: S. Tougher and R. Evans (edd.), Generalship in Ancient Greece, Rome and Byzantium. Edinburgh. pp. 242–263.
- Różycki, Łukasz (2021). Battlefield Emotions in Late Antiquity: A Study of Fear and Motivation in Roman Military Treatises. Brill. ISBN 978-90-04-46241-0.
- Sullivan, Dennis F. (2000). Siegecraft: Two Tenth-century Instructional Manuals. Dumbarton Oaks. ISBN 0-88402-270-6.
- Sullivan, Dennis F. (2010). 'Byzantine Military Manuals. Perceptions, practice and pedagogy' in: P. Stephenson (ed.), The Byzantine World. London. pp. 149–161.
- Theotokis, Georgios - Sidiropoulos, Dimitrios (2021), Byzantine Military Rhetoric in the Ninth Century. A Translation of the Anonymi Byzantini Rhetorica Militaris, Routledge, ISBN 9780367902087
- Treadgold, Warren T. (1995). Byzantium and Its Army, 284–1081. Stanford University Press. ISBN 0-8047-3163-2.
- Trombley, Frank (1997). "The Taktika of Nikephoros Ouranos and Military Encyclopaedism". Pre-modern Encyclopaedic Texts: Proceedings of the Second COMERS Congress, Groningen, 1–4 July 1996. BRILL. pp. 261–274. ISBN 90-04-10830-0.
