= Three Treatises on Imperial Military Expeditions =

The Three Treatises on Imperial Military Expeditions is the conventional title given to a Byzantine literary treatise on warfare associated with Byzantine emperor Constantine Porphyrogennetos (905-959 AD), giving advice on how an emperor should prepare and mount a military campaign. It is actually the appendix to one of his major works, the De Ceremoniis.

The Treatises, as part of the De Ceremoniis, are assumed to have been written by Constantine for his son, the future Romanos II. The date of writing is unknown, but we can assume it was written after 945 AD, when Constantine regained the throne and his son was crowned co-emperor at the age of seven. Constantine's main source for past military protocol was Leo Katakylas, who wrote in the early 10th century under emperor Leo VI the Wise. He in turn drew most of his information from the deeds of Basil I. The popular translation written by John F. Haldon is split into three texts:

== Text A ==
Exposition of imperial expeditions and roster of aplēkta: The text begins with marshaling orders for various themes, and then lists the six major assembly bases (aplekta): Malagina, Dorylaion, Kaborkin, Koloneia, Kaisareia, and Dazimon in the Armeniac Theme. Specific instructions to specific officers (the strategoi, domestikoi, etc.) are contained, as to where they should assemble when the emperor sets off on campaign.

== Text B ==
What should be observed when the emperor intends to go on an expedition: The text consists of two case studies: Constantine the Great and Julius Caesar; only it cannot really be them because they are described very anachronistically – particularly a Christian Julius Caesar. Their names however could be a cover up for using the case studies of the 'heretical' Isaurian emperors, Leo III and Constantine V, etc. – if so then this is proof that iconoclasm was still bitterly condemned during the 10th century.

Constantine the Great is presented as being thorough in campaigns, taking care about gathering information, throwing off spies, and ensuring there was enough equipment – overall stress is laid on the importance of good order (εὐταξία). The text further lists the duties of the strategoi, also of the sakellarios, protovestiarios, domestikos, and dozens of other officers etc. – mainly in making sure there were enough pack animals. Emperors leaving on campaign also had to appoint a representative in the capital to defend the city, provide weapons and maintain morale by suppressing bad rumours and inventing good ones.

Julius Caesar is described as pious, praying at Byzantine churches and giving alms throughout the city. The text also describes Caesar's imperial convoy as it advanced, with different practices and formations when on friendly soil and when in hostile land.

== Text C ==
Constantine, emperor of the Romans...to Romanos, God-crowned emperor, his son. What should be observed when the great and high emperor of the Romans goes on campaign: This is the only text in the work addressed specifically to Romanos – particularly note Constantine's stresses on the importance of father-to-son knowledge.

It features eleven lists of what is required for an imperial expedition, a thorough compilation of officers and items: taxes, fodder, animals for feasts, pay for officers and troops, blankets, saddles, napkins, halters, picks, shovels, weapons, rope, goatskin mats and plain garments for foreigners, cushions, folding tables, folding benches, etc. It also contains advice on camp security and specific ceremonies for greeting troops, and ends with three case studies of the triumphant returns of emperors: Michael III, Basil I and Theophilos.

The text ends abruptly; there is a grand introduction but no conclusion at all, so we can assume that it is an unfinished work.

== Conclusions ==
There was a surprising amount of continuity in Byzantine tradition despite the upheavals of the Muslim conquests, the ensuing Iconoclast controversies and the serious decline in urban life in the West. Central in this process was the continuity of the huge Constantinopolitan bureaucracy itself – the same towering apparatus that kept the taxes flowing in during the 'Byzantine Dark Age' also powered the Byzantine army and its supply mechanism. There is also a surprising amount of late Antique terminology and titulature that survived: the spatharioi and optimatoi date from the 6th century, while the exkoubitai, the praitorion and the komes from even earlier.

The Treatises are also the first military work written by an emperor since Maurice’s Strategikon – Constantine writes about military tradition that has been passed on from the Amorian dynasty, and even before the Isaurian dynasty – though no earlier than the days of Theodosius the Great (5th century AD). The return of confidence implied by the Treatises – note the stress on good order – was part of the general recovery of the Byzantine state during the Macedonian period, which saw extensive reconquests in both Asia and Europe.

The fact that the Treatises deal with offensive operations is an important point to make – it differs significantly from the other major military work of the day, Nikephoros Phokas' On Skirmishing Warfare (De velitatione bellica), which deals with defensive operations against raiders and damage limitation. This work is characteristic of a transitional stage between the bitter fighting of the 7th to 8th centuries and the turning of the tide in the 10th; Constantine's reign saw the beginnings of the great offensive in the East, led by general and then emperor Nikephoros Phokas. Thus the Treatises anticipate the major offensive operations after the mid-10th century, described by the Praecepta Militaria and the Taktika of Nikephoros Ouranos.
