= Quaerendo =

- Discipline: History of manuscripts and books
- Language: English
- Edited by: Lisa Kuitert

Publication details
- History: 1971-present
- Publisher: Brill Publishers
- Frequency: Quarterly

Standard abbreviations
- ISO 4: Quaerendo

Indexing
- ISSN: 0014-9527 (print); 1570-0690 (web)
- OCLC no.: 859945963

Links
- Journal homepage

Quaerendo is a quarterly peer-reviewed academic journal devoted to manuscripts and printed books in Europe. It was established in 1971 and covers codicology, palaeography, and various aspects of the history of books from around 1500 until the present. In addition to full articles, each issue contains a section dedicated to the announcement of new discoveries, publications, and recent events. The editor-in-chief is Lisa Kuitert (University of Amsterdam).
