= Onasander =

1st century AD Ancient Greek philosopher

- Ὀνήσανδρος
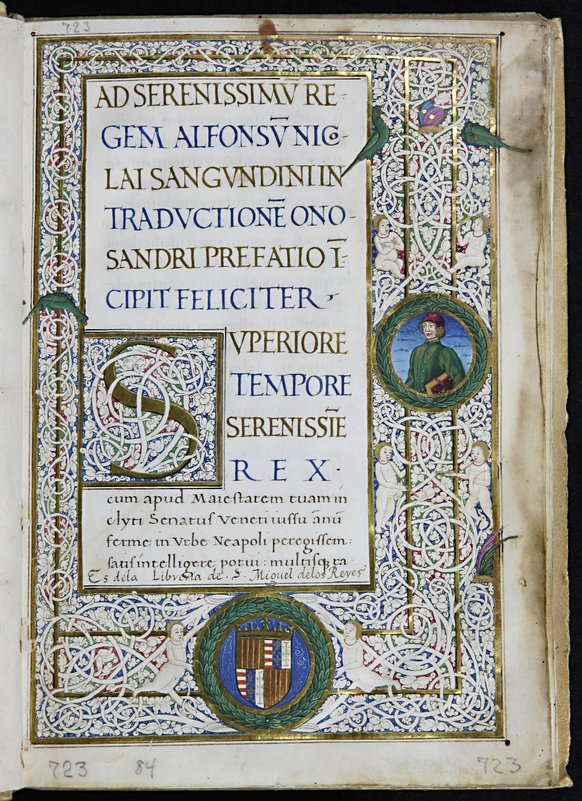
- Start of Sagundino's translation of Onasander's Strategikos from a manuscript copied at Naples in 1494–1495
- Born: c. 1st century AD

Philosophical work
- Era: Ancient philosophy
- Region: Ancient Roman philosophy
- School: Middle Platonism
- Language: Koine Greek
- Notable works: Strategikos

Onasander or Onosander (Ancient Greek: Ὀνήσανδρος Onesandros or Ὀνόσανδρος Onosandros; fl. 1st century AD) was a Greek philosopher. He was the author of a commentary on the Republic of Plato, which is lost; as well as of the Strategikos (Ancient Greek: Στρατηγικός) - a short but comprehensive work on the duties of a general, which was dedicated to Quintus Veranius. The Strategikos was the main source used for the military writings of emperors Maurice and Leo VI, as well as of Maurice of Saxony, who consulted it in a French translation and expressed a high opinion of it.

== Life ==
According to the Suda, he was a Platonic philosopher who, in addition to his surviving military work, Strategikos, or The General, also composed a commentary upon Plato's Republic. The only details known about Onasander's life are from his own work, the Quintus Veranius to whom he dedicated the Strategikos to was the consul of A.D. 49, who died while in command in Britain ten years later, so the terminus ante quem for the composition of the treatise is 59. The only other references to Onasander from antiquity are in Johannes Lydus, who names an Ὀνήσανδρος among Greek military writers, and in the Tactica of the so‑called Leo.

== Strategikos ==
Onasander's Strategikos is one of the most important treatises on ancient military matters and provides information not commonly available in other ancient works on Greek military tactics, especially concerning the use of the light infantry in battle.

According to Oldfather,

the burden of the treatise is really ethics, morale, and the general principles of success in arms.... The treatise consists of forty-two chapters upon various aspects of a commander's duties, notably ethical considerations regarding the character, social status, bearing, behaviour, and attitude of a general towards his troops, the enemy, and his fellow-citizens; the morale of the troops, the effect of particular policies and tactics upon morale, and the like; together with much sound advice about elementary matters.... In two respects Onasander differs markedly from other Greek and Roman military writers. He regards everything from the point of view primarily of the commanding officer, to the question of selecting whom he devotes a long and valuable passage, and he lays uncommon stress upon ethical and religious considerations... there is nothing very philosophic nor technically military in the treatise, which is intended to give merely the broad principles of generalship (στρατηγικαὶ ὑφηγήσεις, prooem. 3), and lays no claim to originality.

== Philosophy ==
According to Oldfather:

Traces of Platonic philosophy have been sought in the [Strategikos], especially in the admonition that friends should fight beside friends (Ch. 24), and in the distinction made between φθόνος and ζῆλος (Ch. 42.25).

But the essence of the first idea is as old as Nestor's advice in the Iliad (Β 362 f.); it was practised among the Eleans, Italic Greeks, Cretans, and Boeotians, being characteristic of the Sacred Band of Thebes, and something similar may not have been unknown at one time in Sparta, hence it can hardly have escaped the attention of military writers. The same topic is treated also in extant literature from before the time of Onasander by Xenophon in his Symposium, VIII.32, 34, 35, so that, although Onasander can hardly have been ignorant of the famous passage in Plato (Symposium, 178E ff.), it is hardly necessary to assume that this was its immediate source.

As for the discrimination between φθόνος and ζῆλος there is no real parallel in Plato, whereas an almost exact counterpart exists in Aristotle.... such definitions, however, were the stock in trade of philosophers, and do not presuppose a specific source unless there is some marked similarity in expression. On the contrary, one would rather be inclined to wonder that, in an ethical study of warfare like the present, a commentator upon Plato's Republic should have failed to show at any point some trace of the not infrequent references to war and its basic cause, the character of the good soldier, the need of constant military exercise, the style of life of the soldier, the professional aspect of successful military preparation, mathematics as a necessary element in an officer's education, proposals looking toward the elimination of certain of the more cruel aspects of warfare, at least between civilized states, and similar topics discussed in that great work. Such silence on the part of Onasander, although not sufficient, perhaps, to cast doubt on the identity of our author with the writer mentioned by [the Suda], would more naturally suggest that in The General we have a study anterior to a period of preoccupation with Plato.

== Legacy ==
According to Oldfather, the influence of Onasander in antiquity was considerable. Most subsequent military writers are indebted to him, notably Maurice and Leo VI, of whom the latter in a large measure paraphrases Onasander. In the Renaissance he enjoyed a remarkable popularity. Translations, beginning with the Latin translation by Niccolò Sagundino in 1493, appeared in rapid succession in Spanish, German, French, Italian, and English, and such a demand, for these were no mere philological exercises, shows that many a practical soldier took to heart his counsel, and that much of it has passed thereby into the common body of military science. Towards the end of the next century the first edition of the Greek text, by Rigaltius, appeared.

== Editions and translations ==
- Oldfather, William Abbot, ed. (1923). "Onasander". Aeneas Tacticus, Asclepiodotus, Onasander. Loeb Classical Library. W. Heinemann. pp. 343–527. ISBN 978-0-434-99156-3.
