= Codicology =

Study of codices or manuscript books

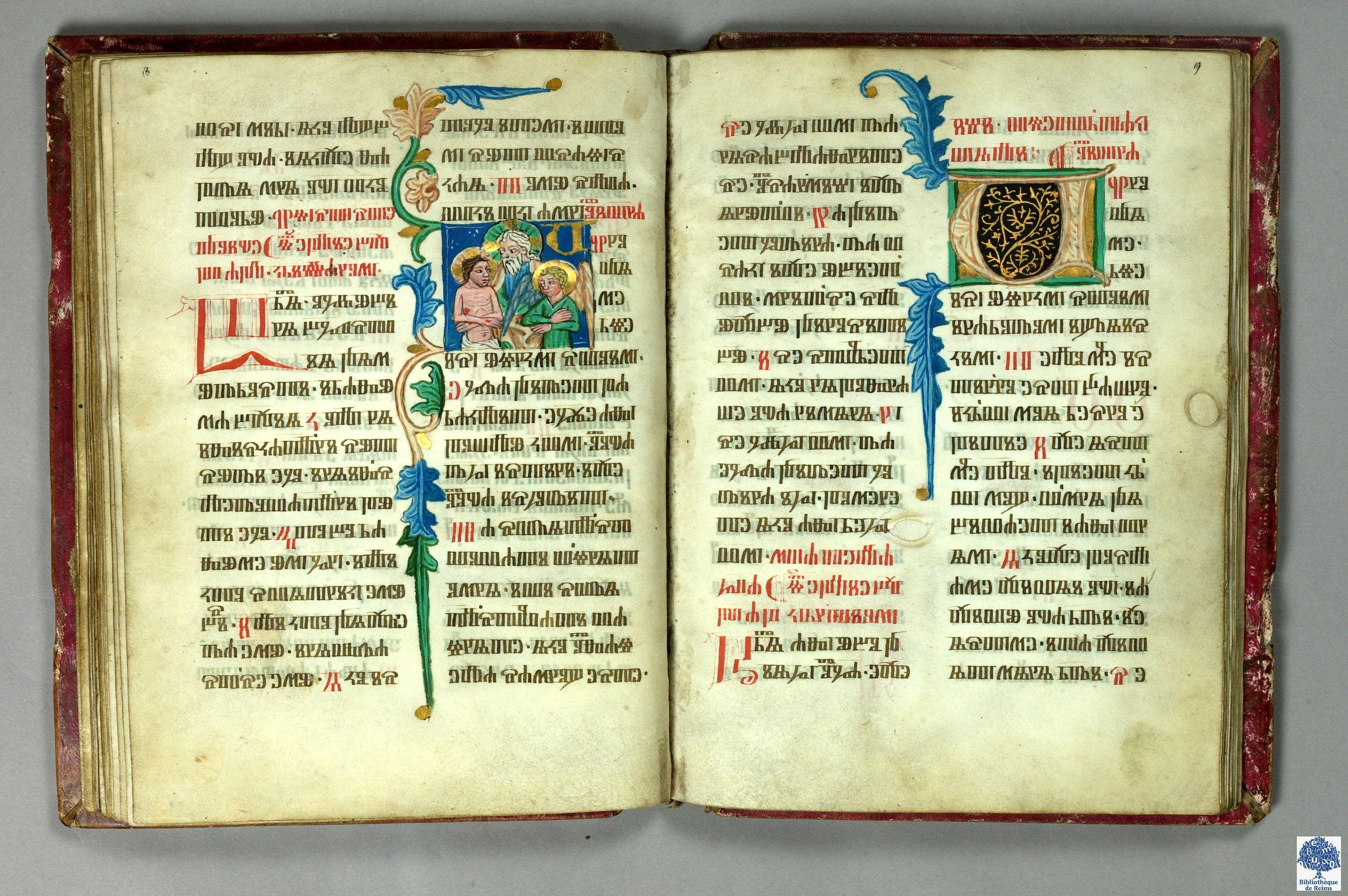
Reims gospel codex (book)

Codicology (/ˌkoʊdɪˈkɒlədʒi/; from French codicologie; from Latin codex, genitive codicis, "notebook, book" and Greek -λογία, -logia) or manuscriptology (Indian English) is the study of codices or manuscript books. It is often referred to as "the archaeology of the book," a term coined by François Masai. It concerns itself with the materials, tools and techniques used to make codices, along with their features.

The demarcation of codicology is not clear-cut. Some view codicology as a discipline complete in itself, while others see it as auxiliary to textual criticism analysis and transmission, which is studied by philology. Codicologists may also study the history of libraries, manuscript collecting, book cataloguing, and scribes, which otherwise belongs to the history of the book. Some codicologists say that their field encompasses palaeography, the study of handwriting, while some palaeographers say that their field encompasses codicology. The study of written features such as marginalia, glosses, ownership inscriptions, etc. falls in both camps, as does the study of the physical aspects of decoration, which otherwise belongs to art history. Unlike traditional palaeography, codicology places more emphasis on the cultural aspect of books. The focus on material is referred to as stricto sensu codicology, while a broader approach, incorporating palaeography, philology, art history, and the history of the book, is referred to as lato sensu codicology, and the exact meaning depends on the codicologist's view.

Palaeographic techniques are used along with codicological techniques. Analysis of the work of the scribe, script styles and their variations, may reveal the book's character, value, purpose, date, and the importance attached to its different parts.

Many incunabula, books printed up to the year 1500, were finished wholly or partly by hand, so they belong to the domain of codicology.

== Study of codices ==
=== Materials ===
The materials codices are made with are their support, and include papyrus, parchment (sometimes referred to as membrane or vellum), and paper. They are written and drawn on with metals, pigments and ink. The quality, size, and choice of support determine the status of a codex. Papyrus is found only in late antiquity and the early Middle Ages. Codices intended for display were bound with more durable materials than vellum. Parchment varied widely due to animal species and finish, and identification of animals used to make it has only begun to be studied in the 21st century. How manufacturing influenced the final products, technique, and style, is little understood. However, changes in style are underpinned more by variation in technique. Before the 14th and 15th century, paper was expensive, and its use may mark off the deluxe copy.

=== Structure ===
The structure of a codex includes its size, format/ordinatio (its quires or gatherings, consisting of sheets folded a number of times, often twice- a bifolio), sewing, bookbinding and rebinding. A quire consisted of a number of folded sheets inserting into one another- at least three, but most commonly four bifolia, that is eight sheets and sixteen pages: Latin quaternio or Greek tetradion, which became a synonym for quires. Unless an exemplar (text to be copied) was copied exactly, format differed. In preparation for writing codices, ruling patterns were used that determined the layout of each page. Holes were prickled with a spiked lead wheel and a circle. Ruling was then applied separately on each page or once through the top folio. Ownership markings, decorations and illumination are also studied. As these features are dependent on time and place, codicology determines characteristics specific to the scriptoria, or any production center, and libraries of codices.

=== Pages ===
Watermarks may provide, although often approximate, dates for when the copying occurred. The layout – size of the margin and the number of lines – is determined. There may be textual articulations, running heads, openings, chapters and paragraphs. Space was reserved for illustrations and decorated guide letters. The apparatus of books for scholars became more elaborate during the 13th and 14th centuries when chapter, verse, page numbering, marginalia finding guides, indexes, glossaries and tables of contents were developed.

=== The libraire ===
By a close examination of the physical attributes of a codex, it is sometimes possible to match up long-separated elements originally from the same book. In 13th century book publishing, due to secularization, stationers or libraires emerged. They would receive commissions for texts, which they would contract out to scribes, illustrators, and binders, to whom they supplied materials. Due to the systematic format used for assembly by the libraire, the structure can be used to reconstruct the original order of a manuscript. However, complications can arise in the study of a codex. Manuscripts were frequently rebound, and this resulted in a particular codex incorporating works of different dates and origins, thus different internal structures. Additionally, a binder could alter or unify these structures to ensure a better fit for the new binding. Completed quires or books of quires might constitute independent book units- booklets, which could be returned to the stationer, or combined with other texts to make anthologies or miscellanies. Exemplars were sometimes divided into quires for simultaneous copying and loaned out to students for study. To facilitate this, catchwords were used- a word at the end of a page providing the next page's first word.

== History ==
=== Origins ===
The study of manuscripts has a long tradition, but codicology has a short history. In the fifteenth century, two works published under the title De laude scriptorium, praised manuscripts and the works of copyists. One was written by Jean Gerson, a Parisian theologian, and the other by Johann Trithemius, the abbot of the Benedictine monastery of Sponheim. In the 16th and 17th centuries, as the study of manuscripts advanced, disputes between philologists and theologians occurred. In the 17th century, the Bollandists collected hagiographes and critically examined their contents and origins. The Maurists contributed to historical and critical analysis of texts, and Jean Mabilon is considered the father of palaeography and diplomatics. Basic principles of codicology were formulated in 1739 by Maurist monk Bernard de Montfaucon. In 1819, Heinrich Stein established the Gesellschaft für ältere deutsche Geschichtskunde, which published Monumenta Germaniae Historica and studies on medieval codices. In 1821, the École Nationale des Chartes was established, and one of the most active manuscript researchers was Leopold Delisle.

In 1825, the librarian Adolph Ebert published a monograph on diplomatics, epigraphy and what he called Bücherhandschrifftenkunde - "the science of internal and external features of manuscripts". In 1909, the philologist Ludwig Traube makes a distinction between paleography and Handschrifftenkunde. To Traube, paleography deals with deciphering writing, interpreting abbreviations and finding textual errors, as well as dating and locating the manuscript. Handschrifftenkunde studies the material elements of the codex, its preparation, and writings not part of the text itself, like annotations.

However, the general tradition up until the 20th century viewed palaeography as not only encompassing the script, but everything used to date the manuscript. Victor Gardthausen in his "Greek Palaeography" divided palaeography into Buchwesen (the structure of the book) and Schriftwesen (the structure of writing). Up to the early 1930s, the study of manuscripts had also been linked to literary history and philology.

Codicology has been studied in a coherent fashion since the late 19th century. Charles Samaran proposed the term codicography in 1934, which he understood as parallel to bibliography, the study of printed books; making manuscript science separate from philology. The term codicology was coined by Alphonse Dain in his 1949 book Les manuscrits to mean the study of manuscripts' external features – history, collections, catalogs – as he also understood the study of material aspects and internal features to belong to palaeography.

=== Archaeological turn ===
Over time, the meaning morphed to the study of the codex as an archeological object; equivalent to Buchwesen. François Masai adopted the term codicology and published an article in Scriptorium in 1950 in which he advocates its independence from palaeography. He viewed codicology as related to diplomatics and within the sphere of archaeology. He did not consider codicology a historical discipline, so this separated it from the history of the book and cultural history. Léon Delaissé preferred to use Masai's "archaeology of the book". Léon Gilissen's "Prolegomènes à la codicologie" is considered by many to be the foundation of a genuine archaeology of the book. In the first two essays of the book, he studied a "site" of twenty parchment manuscripts, and by analysing the composition of quires, concluded that a quire is not an accidental grouping of bifolia cut separately, but the result of folding skin according to precise rules. The method paved the way for more detailed understanding of medieval book production, both preparation and execution. Marilena Maniaci in "Archeologia del manoscritto" conceptualises codicology in the same way.

=== Broader approach ===
Since the 1970s, various codicologists have claimed that codicology should be concerned with the history, usage and reception of a manuscript as a cultural and textual object. Maria Luisa Agati in "Il libro manoscritto da Oriente a Occidente" includes palaeographical features, decoration, and the history of libraries in her study.

=== Quantitative codicology ===
Carla Bozzolo and Ezio Ornato in their 1980 book "Pour une histoire du livre manuscript au Moyen Age" object to the then usual view of the study of manuscripts as a tool for accessing intellectual history or studying illuminated manuscripts as art objects. They advocate for the study of the plenty of ordinary manuscripts, by the archaeological method, with the objective of answering questions that go beyond a particular manuscript. Ornato articulates how the study of the inner features is inseparable from the exterior features of a manuscript. The quantitative method can therefore provide an idea of the economy and culture of manuscript production at a particular time or place or a longer period, relating it to the history of the book. Ornato and his school of followers thus consider codicology an independent and autonomous historical discipline, not subservient to any specialisation. However, his understanding of codicology is not lato sensu, but statistical- the selection of materials, fabrication of quires, number of volumes, prices, work invested, circulation - drawn from a group of manuscripts by time, place, type, etc. Malachi Beit-Arie first used databases in codicology for Hebrew codices.

=== Comparative codicology ===
The progress in quantitative analysis of Latin, Hebrew, Byzantine and Arabic codices prompted research into whether technological practices were shared. This led to comparative codicology, a concept that takes its methodology from the comparative method. It was particularly inspired by linguistics and the possibility of a universal 'grammar' of the codex. The method was used early on in Hebrew codicology, as Hebrew manuscripts are considered intercultural via reflecting the manuscript culture of the dominant culture in which Jewish communities lived. In the 21st century, along with quantitative codicology, it is the most widespread methodology.

=== Structural codicology ===
Starting in the late 1980s, some scholars borrowed ideas from structuralist linguistics and studied the codex as a structure with "morphological" and "syntactic" dimensions, treating its constituent components and their relationships respectively. A "genetic" aspect is also present as it tries to reconstruct the origin of the components and their production. Gumbert and other scholars formulated a syntax to identify codicological units and caesuras (discontinuities or boundaries) of a manuscript, formed by one or more quires, and their stages of production and interrelationships. This method faces difficulties due to manuscripts experiencing changes over their lifetime, due to losses, removals, and additions of text.

=== Islamic codicology ===
While medieval authors may have practised rudimentary codicology, interest in the study of Arabic manuscripts in the West started in the late 18th century. The greatest impetus was given with the first World of Islam Festival in London, in 1976, followed by a colloquium on Islamic codicology and palaeography in Istanbul in 1986. From then on, a number of conferences, exhibitions, catalogues, and specialized periodicals appeared.

== See also ==
- Auxiliary sciences of history – Scholarly disciplines in historical research
- Bodleian Library – Research library of the University of Oxford – collections similar to the British Library.
- British Library – National library of the United Kingdom. Several huge collections, e.g. Harleian Collection (also via Catalogue of medieval and Renaissance manuscripts). The known Anglo-Saxon works include Beowulf and the Lindisfarne Gospel (Book of Lindisfarne).
- Fragmentology (manuscripts) – Study of manuscript fragments
- Library of Congress – US Congress research library – Washington D.C., huge catalogue of manuscript collections.
- Manuscriptology – Study of codices or manuscript books
- Textual scholarship – Academic analysis of texts
