= Libellus de vocabulis rei militaris =

Latin military treatise

Rubric and decorated initial at the start of the oldest copy of the Libellus, misattributed to Cicero in a 14th-century manuscript

The Libellus de vocabulis rei militaris is a Latin military treatise in the form of a collection of excerpts from the first three books of the Epitoma rei militaris of Vegetius. The author is conventionally known as Modestus (or Pseudo-Modestus) and most probably worked between the 9th and 12th centuries. His work is known from over 30 manuscripts and was printed six times before 1500. It was one of the canonical "old" military treatises of the 16th and 17th centuries. There is a late translation into Italian.

== Content and dedication ==
The Libellus is a short treatise. It circulated widely alongside the Epitoma, despite its complete lack of originality. It is nothing but a collection of rearranged excerpts from the first three books of the Epitoma. It ignores siege warfare and naval warfare and "concentrates on the composition of the army and its disposition in battle". It is divided into 23 chapters, two of which are drawn from the Epitoma's first book, fourteen from its second, seven from its third and none from its fourth. Of the fourteen chapters based on the second book, six are also chapters in Vegetius lifted unabridged. The ordering of the excerpts is topical, even when it diverges from the order in Vegetius.

In 1580, François Modius identified one sentence in the entire work not derived from Vegetius. It is not part of the original work, however, but was added by an editor and is taken from John of Salisbury's Policraticus. It is found in a single copy, a manuscript copied by Pietro Ippolito da Luni (fl. 1472–1492) for Cardinal Oliviero Carafa, now Vatican, Apostolic Library, lat. 3551.

The Libellus' complete dependence on Vegetius was pointed out in print as early as 1580 by Modius. In 1585, however, Gottschalk Stewech argued that it was Vegetius who was dependent on the Libellus. In 1607, Petrus Scriverius defended Modius' conclusion and it has never been challenged since. Stewech's argument was based on the Libellus' dedication to Tacitus (275–276), who reigned a century before Vegetius' dedicatee, Gratian (376–383). This dedication, however, is a late addition. The earliest copy with a dedication to an emperor is from 1474 and names the emperor Theodosius. The earliest with a dedication to Tacitus is from 1487.

== Authorship ==
It is uncertain if Modestus is the actual name of the compiler, a pen name or neither. The name Modestus is found in several manuscripts and most editions, but is not attested before 1474. It is probably a piece of late guesswork or invention. Some modern scholars have therefore opted for "Pseudo-Modestus".

The earliest surviving ascription of the Libellus is to Cicero. This ascription is false, but it is not known if the work was originally a forgery written in Cicero's name or if it merely came to be ascribed to him by mistake. In the 14th century, it was believed that Cicero had written a military treatise, because the author of the Rhetorica ad Herennium, mistakenly believed at the time to have been written by Cicero, describes his intention to write such a treatise. No such treatise is actually known, nor do the three surviving references to it show that the supposed treatise was actually in circulation in the 14th century. The De vita et moribus philosophorum of 1326 refers to a single book by Cicero de rebus militaribus ('on military matters'). In one of his Familiar Letters dated 1345, Petrarch refers to a lost work of Cicero on rei militaris. A manuscript of 1376 containing a list of works by Cicero includes a Liber de re militari. These references may explain how the Libellus could have been seen as a lost work of Cicero. Already in the 15th century, however, some scribes were casting doubt on the attribution.

Another false attribution is to Cato. This may be a result of textual corruption of the name Cicero or another piece of educated guesswork based on Vegetius' citation of the work of Cato.

Independently, Amedeo Peyron (1820) and Friedrich Gottlob Haase (1847) proposed that the real compiler of the work was the Italian humanist Pomponio Leto (1428–1498), whose work appears alongside it in an edition of 1474. Some later scholars have even labelled the work a forgery by either Leto or one of his students. These views are untenable, having been disproved by Lorenzo Dalmasso in 1907, citing manuscripts of the Libellus that are older than Leto. It is possible that the attribution to Modestus originated with Leto or his followers, either as pure invention or educated guess. The sudden appearance in the late 15th century of a classical name and an imperial dedication certainly had the effect of "creating a new classic".

The 9th-century copy of Vegetius that Pseudo-Modestus may have used

There have been attempts to identify a historical Modestus whose name may have formed the inspiration for the misattribution. Candidates include Julius Modestus, mentioned by Suetonius; Aufidius Modestus, cited by Philargyrius; and Herennius Modestinus, the disciple of Ulpian.

== Date ==
Of the date of the Libellus, the most that can be said with certainty is that it was compiled sometime after 450 and before the mid-14th century, the date of the earliest manuscript. In 450, one Flavius Eutropius corrected a copy of the Epitoma at Constantinople and the version used by the compiler stems from this corrected version. Its modern editors opt for a date in the 9th century. In favour of this hypothesis is the fact that two other 9th-century writers are known to have excerpted Vegetius, Sedulius Scotus and Hrabanus Maurus. The emphasis of the Libellus, however, is entirely different from those of the compilations of Sedulius and Hrabanus.

Michael Reeve puts the work between the mid-9th century and the 12th century. He argues that the Libellus was compiled from a 9th-century manuscript of Vegetius copied at Corbie Abbey in the time of Hadoard (fl. c. 850). This manuscript, now Paris, Bibliothèque nationale de France, lat. 6503, contains a system of brackets which may mark passages to be excerpted. The one who added the brackets appears to also have made a correction that was included in the 12th-century manuscript Montpellier, Bibliothèque interuniversitaire section médecine, H 133. If the corrector was indeed the excerptor, he must have worked no later than the 12th century.

The Libellus is still occasionally taken to be a work of antiquity.

== Manuscripts and editions ==
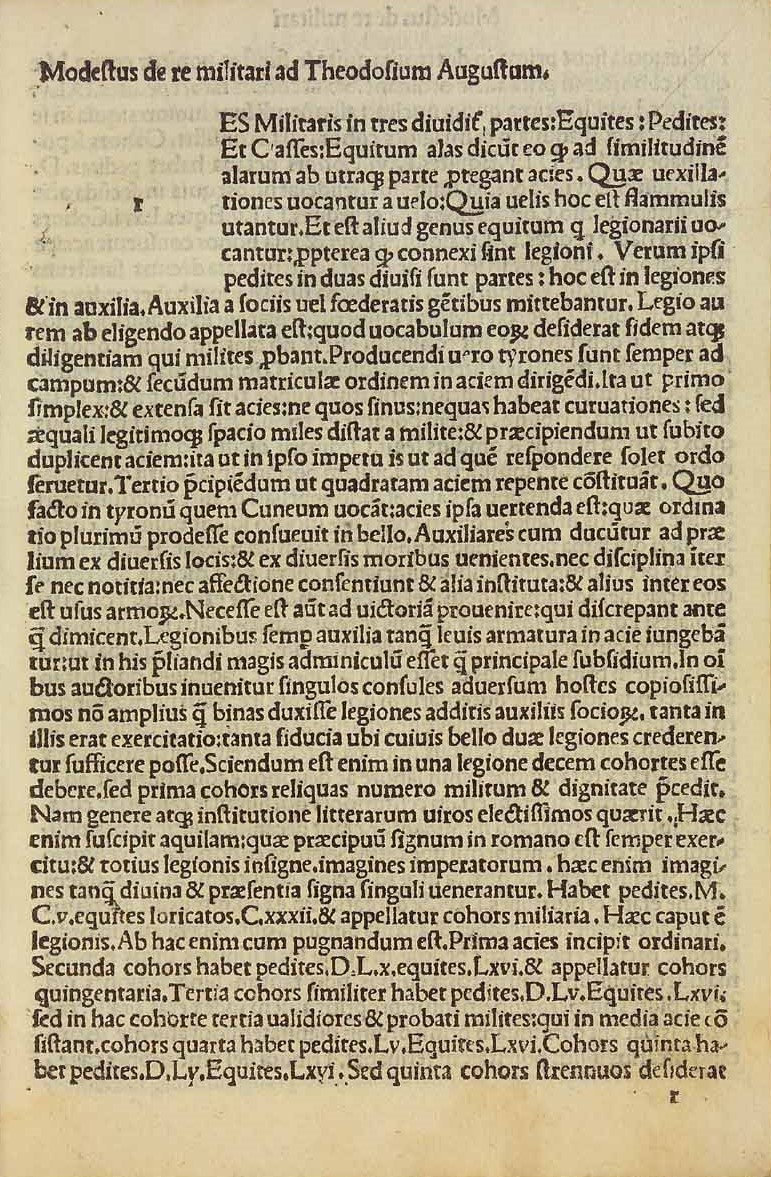
Start of the Libellus in the edition of 1494

There are at least 31 manuscripts of the Latin version of the Libellus. The oldest, now El Escorial, Real Biblioteca de San Lorenzo, R. I. 2, was copied in France in the mid-14th century. Most of the manuscripts, however, are of Italian origin. Besides the Escorial, they are found in libraries in Cambridge, Florence, Glasgow, Leiden, London, Lucca, Milan, Modena, Naples, Paris, Pavia, Pesaro, Prague, Stockholm, Târgu Mureș, Turin, Vaduz and the Vatican City. The late and decidedly Italian manuscript tradition may relate to the Libellus' emphasis on Vegetius' neglected second book, which was seeing renewed attention in 14th-century Italy.

There is an Italian translation, Delle ordinanze de' Romani, known from a single manuscript copy from the 17th or 18th century, now London, British Library, Add. 24216. The translation contains only the first 21 chapters, but does have the interpolation from Policraticus. It is attributed to a certain Landino, which the library catalogue identifies with Cristoforo Landino (1424–1498).

Six printed editions of the Libellus appeared before 1500. Under the title De disciplina militari and ascribed to Cicero, it was printed with his other philosophical works by Wendelin of Speyer at Venice in 1471. It was printed again at Venice in 1474 under the title De re militari, dedicated to Theodosius and ascribed to Modestus. Under the same title and author, it was printed at Rome around the same time and again in 1494. In 1487, a new edition prepared by Giovanni Sulpizio da Veroli and printed by Eucharius Silber appeared at Rome under the title Libellus de vocabulis rei militaris, dedicated to Tacitus but still ascribed to Modestus. In 1495–1496, an edition with the same title was printed at Bologna. This became the preferred title to distinguish the work from that of Vegetius, which was often called De re militari.

In the 15th century, the Libellus was frequently copied alongside other military works. It appears together with the works of Vegetius and Frontinus in Turin, Biblioteca Reale, Saluzzo 3; Leiden, Bibliotheek der Rijksuniversiteit, Voss. lat. F. 59; and Paris, Bibliothèque Mazarine, 3732, where it is also accompanied by the work of Aelian. Beginning with the 1487 edition and continuing throughout the 16th and 17th centuries, the Libellus, under the name Modestus, was one of the canonical "scriptores veteres rei militaris" (old writers on military matters), alongside Vegetius, Frontinus and Aelian.

== Bibliography ==
- Allmand, Christopher (2011). The De Re Militari of Vegetius: The Reception, Transmission and Legacy of a Roman Text in the Middle Ages. Cambridge University Press.
- González Rolán, Tomás; Moure Casas, Ana (1986–1987). "Modesti libellus de vocabulis rei militaris ad Tacitum Augustum (Estudio de la transmisión manuscrita y edición crítica)". Cuadernos de Filología Clásica. 20: 293–328. Archived from the original on 2023-07-06.
- Liong, Katherine Amie (2011). Cicero de re militari: A Civilian Perspective on Military Matters in the Late Republic (PDF) (PhD dissertation). University of Edinburgh. Archived (PDF) from the original on 2023-07-06.
- Paniagua, David (2012). "Ad minimum redigere: gli excerpta dello pseudo-Modesto come ricodifica dell'Epitoma rei militaris di Vegezio". Rursus. 8. Archived from the original on 2023-07-06.
- Reeve, Michael D. (2003). "Modestus, scriptor rei militaris". In Pierre Lardet (ed.). La tradition vive: Mélanges d'histoire des textes en l'honneur de Louis Holtz. Bibliologia. Vol. 20. Brepols. pp. 417–432. doi:10.1484/m.bib-eb.3.1418. ISBN 978-2-503-51321-8.
- Reeve, Michael D., ed. (2004). Vegetius: Epitoma rei militaris. Oxford University Press.
- Reeve, Michael D. (2011). "A Proposal About Modestus, scriptor rei militaris". Manuscripts and Methods: Essays on Editing and Transmission. Edizioni di storia e letteratura. pp. 186–207.
- Robles Sánchez, María Ángeles (2003). "El ejército romano según el Breve tratado de términos militares de Modesto (Modesti libellus de vocabulis rei militaris ad Tacitum Augustum): Traducción". Aqvila Legionis. 4: 137–164.
- Robles Sánchez, María Ángeles (2004). "Estudio léxico del Breve tratado de términos militares de Modesto". Aqvila Legionis. 5: 45–105.
