= Johann Jacobi von Wallhausen =

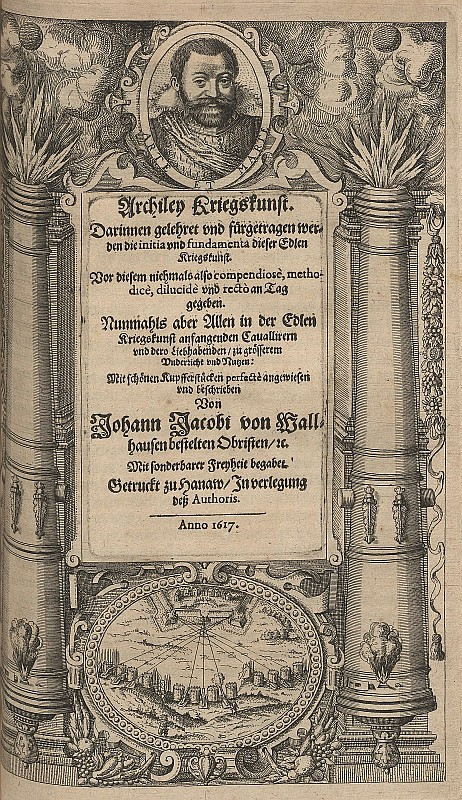
Titlepage of Archiley-Kriegskunst with his portrait (1617)

Johann Jacobi von Wallhausen (né Johannes Tautphoeus; c. 1580 – 20 October 1627) was a German soldier and writer.

== Life ==
Wallhausen was born in the village of Dautphe. His family name was Jacob and his original surname was Tautphoeus, after his birthplace. He adopted the name von Wallhausen after the town of Wallhausen, where his father, Justus Jacobi, served as the Lutheran pastor. What is known of his life is mostly derived from his writings. In 1596, he was a student at the Gymnasium Philippinum. He later attended the University of Marburg.

In 1599, after killing an opponent in a duel, he joined the army of Maurice, Prince of Orange, and served in the Eighty Years' War in the Netherlands. In 1613, he joined the militia of Danzig as a captain. In 1616, he was appointed by John VII, Count of Nassau-Siegen, to head up the new Protestant military academy in Siegen, "the newest and most advanced military academy of the day". He left in 1617 after only a few months. In 1620, he was in the service of the Electorate of Mainz, a Catholic prince and an enemy of the counts of Nassau. He died in Danzig in 1627.

== Works ==
Wallhausen wrote 14 works published in his lifetime. These include:

- Kriegskunst zu Fuß (1615), translated into French (1615), Dutch (1617) and Russian under the title Uchenie i khitrost’ratnogo stroeniia pekhotnykh liudeĭ (1649), being the first military treatise printed by the Moscow Print Yard and even the first substantial secular work printed in Russia
- Kriegskunst zu Pferdt (1616), translated into French (1617)
- Romanische Kriegskunst (1616), an edition of the De re militari of Vegetius, also translated into French under the title La milice Romain (1616)
- Ritterkunst (1616), translated into French (1616)
- Manuale militare (1616)
- Archiley-Kriegskunst (1617)
- Kriegskunst von Feuerwercken (1617)
- Corpus militare (1617)
- Camera militaris oder Kriegskunst Schatzkammer (1621)
- Defensio patriae oder Landrettung (1621)

According to Wallhausen, "with the exception of Theology, the art of war surpasses all the other arts and sciences, liberal as much as mechanical". He wrote in German and his works were rushed to publication, which resulted in numerous printer's errors. They are copiously illustrated with engravings by and under the direction of Johann Theodor de Bry. He promised an illustrated translation of Aelianus Tacticus into German and French, but the work never appeared. His well illustrated edition of Vegetius in German and French shows that he was a practical soldier who appreciated Vegetius for his emphasis on training and drilling. The academy at Siegen would almost certainly have been based on his interpretations of Vegetius.

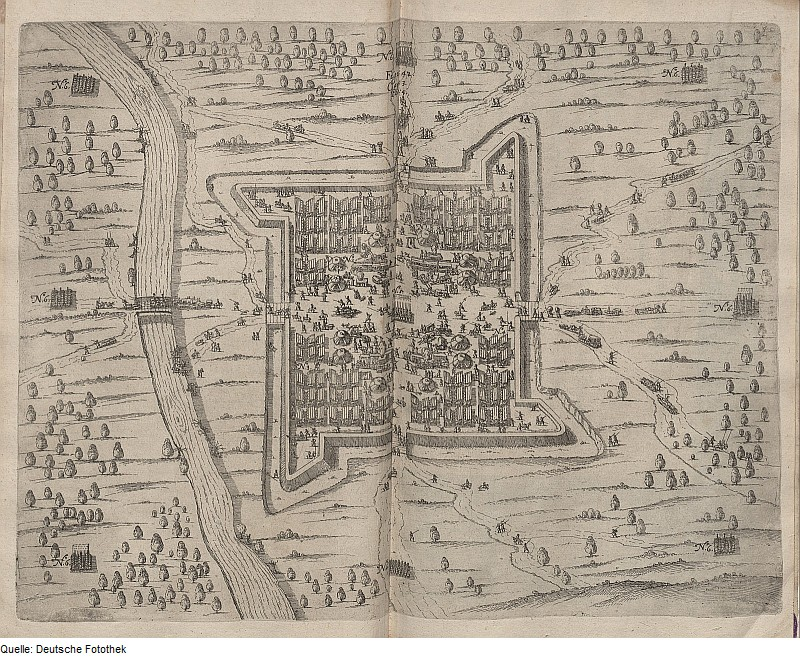
A fortress from Kriegskunst zu Pferdt

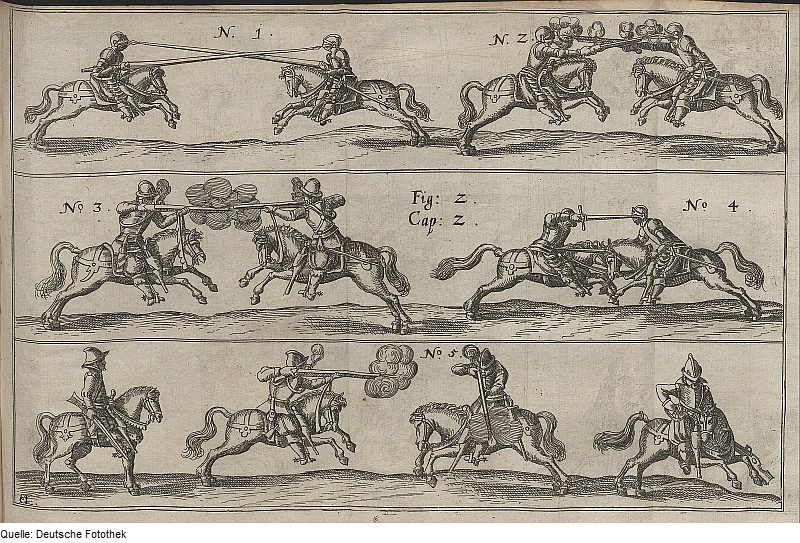
Cavalry fighting from Manuale militare

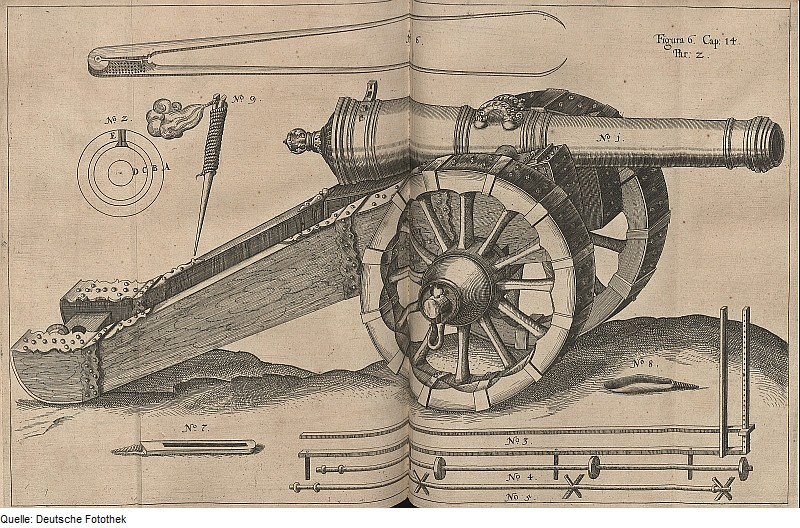
Cannon from Archiley-Kriegskunst

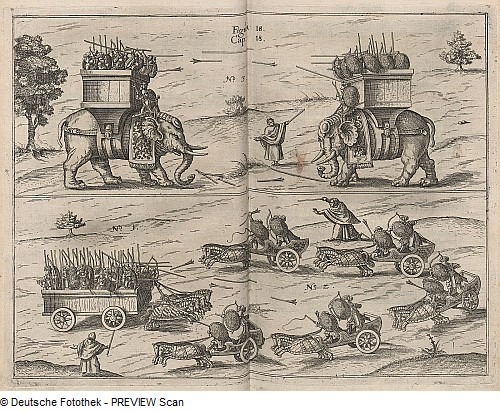
War elephants from Romanische Kriegskunst
