= Military treatise =

A work concerning war

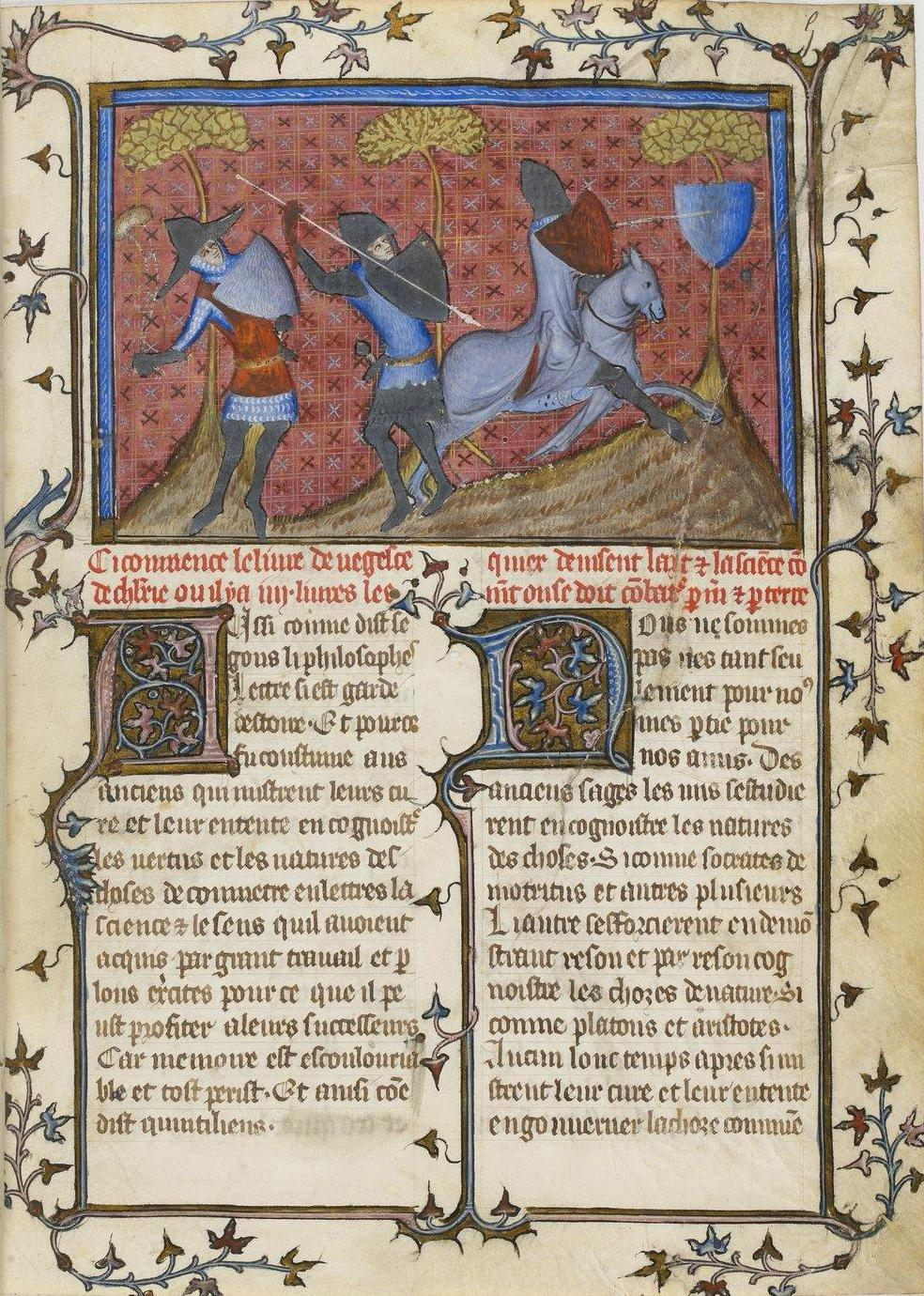
Page from a 14th-century French translation of Epitoma rei militaris

A military treatise or treatise on war is any work that deals with the "art of war" in some basic aspect. Fundamentally military treatises are treatises on military strategy. Other works may also be included in the definition that, although they deal with other topics, include sensitive information about military matters. These may include, among others, description of specific battles, sieges, general campaigns, reports of military authorities, and commented works about ground or naval battles.

== Etymology ==
The term treatise derives from the Latin word "tractatus", meaning a formal, systematic discourse.

== Chronological list of works ==
Considering the various aspects of the war, the armies and the military operations, a chronology of military treatises allows to locate each work within a timeline, facilitating its consultation and comparison with similar works.

This chronology includes actual military treatises together with some works related to the subject (military expeditions or campaigns, descriptions of sieges and others). Whenever possible, references will include the possibility of consulting the original work or a complete translation.

=== 10th century BC ===
- 1100 - 900 BCE Dhanurveda, a Hindu text which is also known as "Military science".

=== 5th century BC ===
- c. 496 BC. The Art of War. Sun tzu.

=== 4th century BC ===
- 370 BC Anabasis. Xenophon. Despite not being a treatise, the "Expedition of the Ten Thousand" shows many aspects of a military withdrawal from that era.
- c. 350 BC. Commentarius Poliorceticus. Aeneas Tacticus.

=== 3rd century BC ===
- c. 220 BC. Poliorcetica. Philo of Byzantium. A. de Rochas d'Aiglun: Traité de Fortification, d'Attaque et de Défense des Places par Philon de Bysance. Paris, 1872.
  - Treatise on war machines: Belopoeica.
- Arthashastra - Written by Indian philosopher Chanakya.

=== 1st century BC ===
- Commentarii de Bello Civili
- Commentarii de Bello Gallico
- De Bello Alexandrino
- De Bello Africo
- De Bello Hispaniensi

=== 1st century AD ===
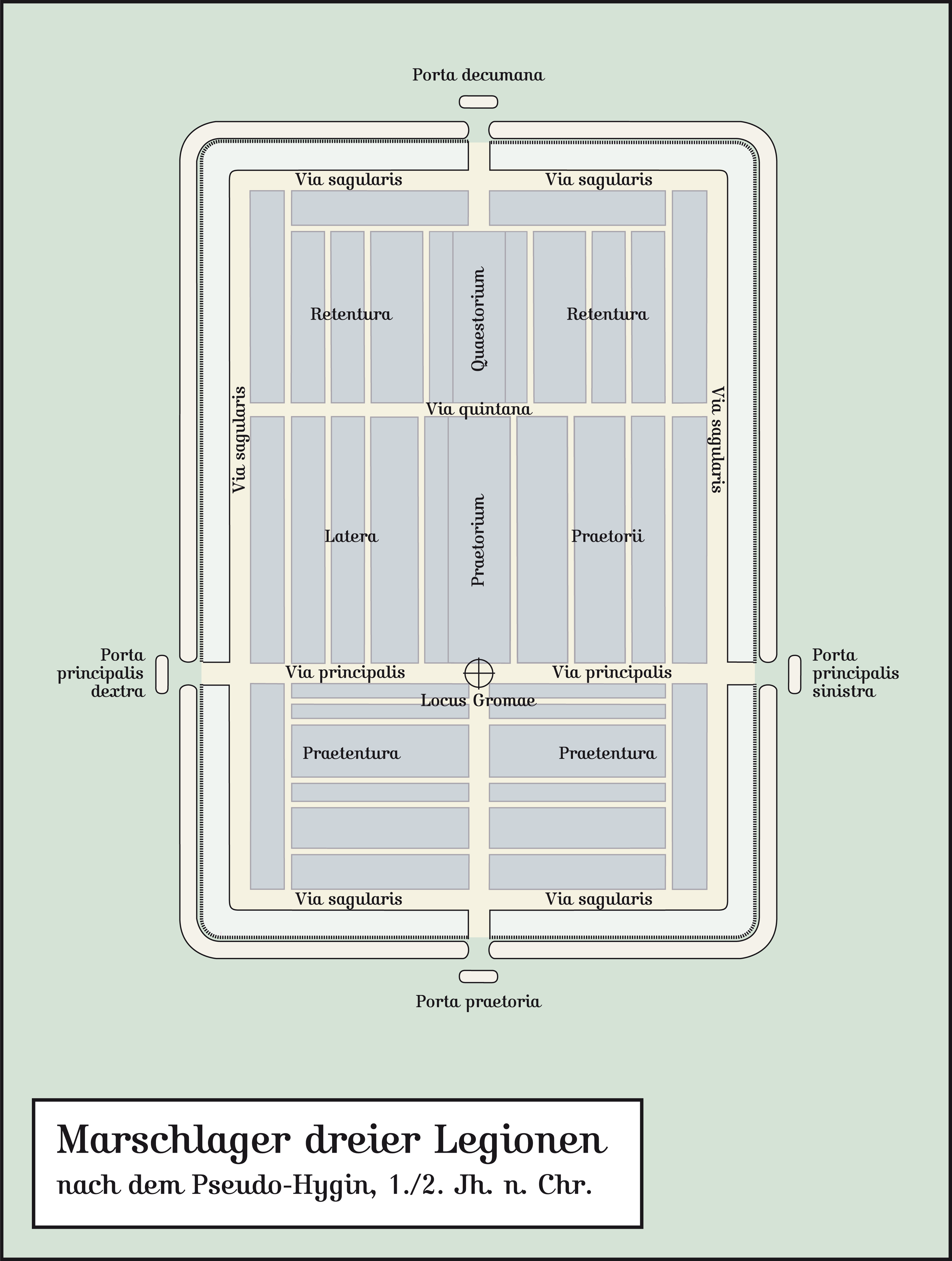
Outline of a Roman camp.

- Strategematicon Libri IV. Sextus Julius Frontinus.

=== 2nd century ===
Outline of a Roman camp.

- 106 AD Περί Στρατηγικών Τάξεων Ἑλληνικών (On Tactical Arrays of the Greeks). Aelianus Tacticus.
- c. 110 AD Liber of munitionibus castrorum. Hyginus Gromaticus.
- 130 AD Poliorcetica. Apollodorus of Damascus.
- c. 160. Flavius Arrianus ("Arrian"). He wrote two treatises:
  - Tactics. Lost work.
  - Arrian's array against the Alans.
- 163. Polyaenus was a Greek writer who authored a work on war strategies (Στρατηγήματα), Stratagems, the most part of which has been preserved.

=== 5th century ===
- c. 450. De Re Militari. Flavius Vegetius.
  - Libellus de vocabulis rei militaris, medieval compendium based on Vegetius
- c. 480. Strategikon of the Byzantine Emperor Mauritius.
  - This manual indicates the use of a cowboy-like "lasso" by Byzantine cavalry soldiers.

=== 10th century ===
- c. 900. Tactics of Leo VI the Wise.
  - Italian translation.
- c. 950. Sylloge Tacticorum.
- c. 970. Liber de velitatione bellica. Nikephoros II Phokas.

=== 11th century ===
- c. 1078. Strategikon of Kekaumenos.

=== 14th century ===
- Kitab fi ma'rifat 'ilm ramy al-siham, a treatise on archery written by Ḥusayn al-Yūnīnī around 1320
- Munyatu'l-Ghuzat
- c. 1385. Francesc Eiximenis in the Twelfth of Crestian spoke of war in general and naval war, explaining the discipline and order that must be observed on ships.

=== 15th century ===
- 1402. Siege and destruction of the Christian castle of Izmir by the forces of Tamerlan.
- 1480. Guillaume Caoursin, Obsidionis Rhodiæ urbis descriptio
  - The Latin original is a relatively short description of the siege of Rhodes from 1480. A study by Albert G. Hauf i Valls allows the content to be viewed in Catalan. This study includes the original text in Latin.
  - Joan Esteve's Liber Elegantiarum uses many phrases from the Latin original translating it into Valencian.
    - The above study by A. Hauf and Valls presents in a very clear way the original sentences of Caoursin and the translation of Joan Esteve.

=== 16th century ===
- 1521. Dell'arte della guerra. Niccolò Machiavelli.
- 1565. The siege of Malta (1565) was very important from the point of view of military theory and fortification. There is a work that describes the siege.
- 1577. Theorica y practica de guerra. Bernardino de Mendoza.
  - English translation as Theorique and Practise of Warre (1597)
- 1582. De jure et officiis bellicis et disciplina militari. Balthazar Ayala.
  - English translation published in 1912 in the Carnegie Institution Classics of International Law series.
- 1589. Discurso sobre la forma de reducir la disciplina a mejor y antiguo estado. Sancho de Londoño
- 1596. Libro del arte militar. Sancho de Londoño

=== 17th century ===
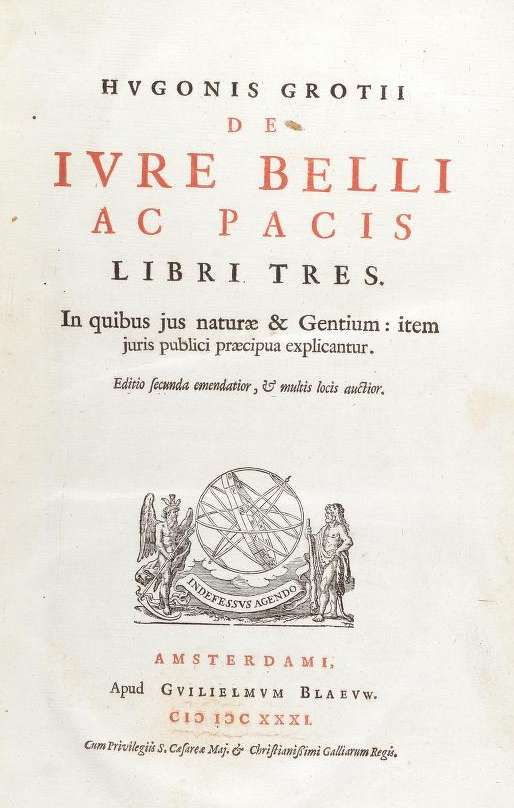
De ivre belli ac pacis, cover of the second edition of 1631.

- 1605. Les Elemens de l'Artillerie. Florence Rivault.
- 1606. Il mastro di campo generale. Giorgio Basta.
  - German translation: Il maestro di campo generale, das ist: außfürliche Anzeig, Bericht und Erklärung von dem Ampt eines General-Feldt-Obersten (1617)
- 1610. I Carichi Militari. Lelio Brancaccio
- 1612. Il governo della cavalleria leggiera. Giorgio Basta.
  - German translation as Governo della cavalleria, Das ist, Bericht Von Anführung der leichten Pferde (1614)
  - French translation as Le gouvernement de la cavallerie légère (1616).
- 1625. De iure belli ac pacis. Hugo Grotius.
  - English translation as The Rights of War and Peace (1814).
- 1633. Principes de l'art militaire. Gamaliel de La Tour.
- 1634. A Discourse of Military Discipline. Gerat Barry.
- 1640. Military Preludes. Domènec Moradell.
- 1697. Dell'arte della guerra. Raimondo Montecuccoli.

=== 18th century ===
- 1740. Mémoires contenant les maximes sur la guerre. Antoine de Pas de Feuquières.
- 1743. Elements de la guerre des sieges. Guillaume Le Blond.
- 1756. Traité de la difference entre la guerre offensive et défensive.
- 1757. Science de la marine: le service et l'art de la guerre sur mer. P. P. A. BARDET DE VILLENEUVE.
- 1772. Art militaire des chinois, ou recueil d'anciens traites sur la guerre, composés avant l'ere chrétienne, par différents généraux chinois. P. Amiot.
- 1796. Grundsätze der Strategie, erläutert durch die Darstellung des Feldzuges von 1796 in Deutschland. Charles Louis of Austria (Duke of Teschen).
- 1799. Geist des neuern Kriegssystems hergeleitet aus dem Grundsatze einer Basis der Operationen. Heinrich Dietrich von Buelow (Bülow).

=== 19th century ===
- 1809. Nouveau dictionnaire historique des sièges et batailles et mémorables et des combats maritimes les plus fameux.
- 1812. Pyrotechnie militaire, ou traité complet des feux de guerre et des bouches à feu. Claude Fortuné Ruggieri.
- 1828. The Naval Battles of Great Britain: From the Accession of the Illustrious House of Hanover to the Throne to the Battle of Navarin. Charles Ekins.
- 1832. From the war. Carl von Clausewitz
- 1851. Dell'arte della guerra. Girolamo Ulloa Calà.
- 1853. The principles of war. Auguste Frédéric Lendy.
- 1855. Considerations on tactics and strategy. George Twemlow.
- 1858. Elementary history of the progress of the Art of War. James John Graham.
- 1860. Elements of Military Art and Science. Henry Wager Halleck.
- 1862. The Art of War. Antoine Henri baron of Jomini.
  - In French: Volume 1.
  - In French: Volume 2.
- 1862. Elements of Military Art and Science. Henry Wager Halleck.
- 1863. CAMPAIGNS OF 1862 AND 1863 ILLUSTRATING THE PRINCIPLES OF STRATEGY. EMIL SCHALK.
- 1863. Elements of Military Art and History. George Washington Cullum.
- 1870. Der Gebirgskrieg (The War in the Mountains). Franz Kuhn von Kuhnenfeld.
- 1871. Covered by the art of war. Louis-Nathaniel Rossel.
- 1873. Difesa dell'Italia secondo i principi sviluppati dal generale Franz von Kuhn. Orazio Dogliotti.

=== 20th century ===
- 1933. Die Truppenführung. Ludwig Beck.
- 1937. A history of the art of war in the sixteenth century. Charles Oman.
- 1975. United States Strategic Institute.
- 1993. Theory and Nature of War: Readings.
- 1995. Strategic Intelligence: Theory and Application.

=== 21st century ===
- 2006. Irregular Enemies and the Essence of Strategy: Can the American Way of War Adapt?
- 2009. Schools for Strategy: Teaching Strategy for 21st Century Conflict.
- 2023. Modern positional warfare and how to win it. Valerii Zaluzhnyi.

== See also ==
- Byzantine military manuals
- List of military theorists and writers
