= Pseudo-Seneca =

Pseudo-Seneca may refer to:

- Pseudo-Seneca (bust), a Roman bronze bust of the late 1st century BC once believed to depict Seneca the Younger
- Pseudo-Seneca (pseudepigrapha), literary works falsely ascribed to Seneca the Younger
