= Pulcher tractatus de materia belli =

~1300 Latin military treatise

The Pulcher tractatus de materia belli ('Beautiful treatise on the matter of war') is an anonymous Latin military treatise from around 1300.

The author of the Pulcher is unknown. He provides no information about himself, but was almost certainly male and a layman. His Latin is good but he probably lacked an academic background. He wrote in northern Italy, probably in the period 1290–1310, and probably had military experience in the wars between the Guelphs and Ghibellines. His intended audience was "the military administrators and leaders of city-state infantry militia" in Italy.

The Pulcher is divided into 34 titled chapters. It does not address naval or siege warfare, deferring to the De re militari of Vegetius. The author writes extensively on cavalry and infantry, making it impossible to determine in which service he had personal experience. He relies heavily on Vegetius, but his chapters on just war and military training are original. He emphasises that war is a last resort, citing the Bible, Cicero and Seneca. In the chapter on training, he cites Avicenna. He also cites John of Salisbury.

Based supposedly on advice given to Alexander the Great, the Pulcher recommends a decimal military system, in which the commander has ten officers reporting immediately to him, each with ten under them and so on down to units of ten soldiers. In one place, it recommends encircling a smaller force short on supplies but elswhere advises against encircling the enemy, since it will cause them to fight with desperation.

The autograph manuscript does not survive and the work is known from a single manuscript copy made on watermarked paper between 1383 and 1396 in northern Italy. The copyist added the title by which it is now known. It was bound with various other works in a miscellany that founds it way to Saint Lambert's Abbey, which lay on a transalpine trade route. The manuscript was edited there by Prior Klemens Heuerraus between about 1450 and 1470. When the abbey was dissolved in 1786, the manuscript was acquired by the University of Graz Library, where it is now Cod. I 1901. The Pulcher has been printed just once, by Alfred Pichler in 1927.

There is an anonymous Bavarian translation of the Pulcher under the Latin title De materia bellandi. It is found a manuscript copied about 1470 and formerly in the possession of Anton von Annenberg, now FB. 1050 in the Tyrolean State Museum. It is part of a collection of translated texts that form a mirror for princes "made for a noble patron of strong bibliophile tendencies". The surviving Latin copy was not the exemplar for the Bavarian version, since the latter avoids some obvious copysist's errors in the former. It counts 33 named chapters and a preface.

== Bibliography ==
- Allmand, Christopher (2011). The De Re Militari of Vegetius: The Reception, Transmission and Legacy of a Roman Text in the Middle Ages. Cambridge University Press.
- Bliese, John R. E. (1994). "Rhetoric Goes to War: The Doctrine of Ancient and Medieval Military Manuals". Rhetoric Society Quarterly. 24 (3): 105–130. doi:10.1080/02773949409391022.
- Fürbeth, Frank (1995). "Eine unbekannte deutsche Übersetzung des Vegetius aus der Bibliothek des Anton von Annenberg". Zeitschrift für deutsches Altertum und deutsche Literatur. 124 (3): 278–297. JSTOR 20658819.
- Gassmann, Jürg (2024). "The Pulcher tractatus de materia belli: A Military Practitioner's Manual from c.1300" (PDF). Nuovo Antologia Militare. 5 (Fasc. 17): 105–138.
