= Godescalcus Stewechius =

Dutch historian

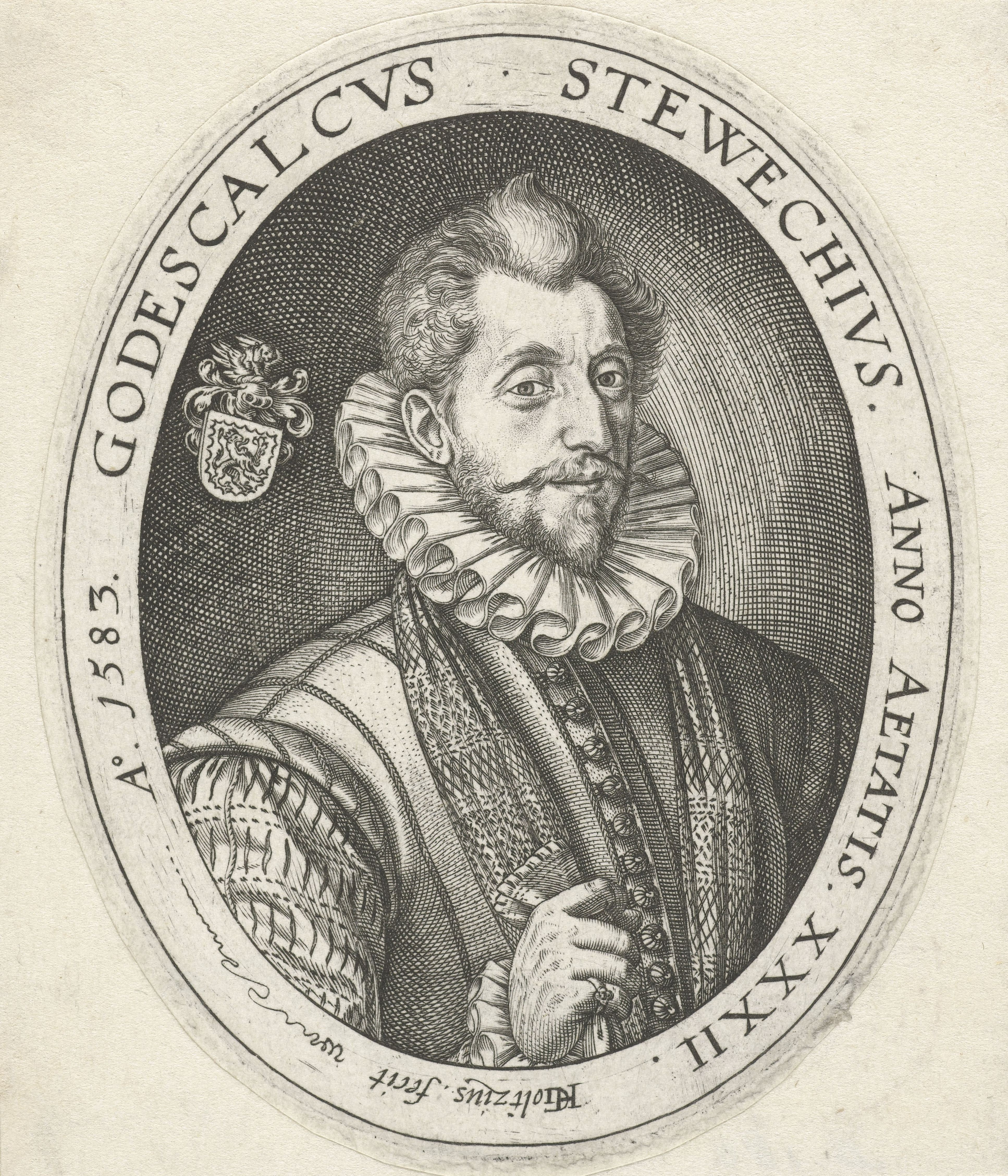
Portrait from 1583

Godescalcus Stewechius (or Gottschalk Stewech; 1557 – c. 1588) was a Dutch humanist from Heusden. He studied at Louvain University. Beginning in 1578, he lived in Cologne, Toul and Langres to escape the war in the Netherlands. He became a professor at the University of Pont-à-Mousson and around 1587 visited Trier to see some manuscripts. He died there.

In 1585, he edited a collection of Roman military treatises by Flavius Vegetius Renatus (De re militari), Sextus Julius Frontinus, Aelianus and Pseudo-Modestus (De vocabulis rei militaris), as well as extracts from Polybius on the construction of a military encampment and his own commentary.
