= Pseudo-Seneca (pseudepigrapha) =

Various antique and medieval texts purporting to be by Seneca the Younger, but with unconfirmed authorship, have sometimes been referred to as Pseudo-Seneca. Examples include:

- Hercules Oetaeus, a play
- Octavia, a play
- De remediis fortuitorum
- De legalibus institutis, a florilegium including some material from De nugis philosophorum
- De moribus, a collection of 145 maxims
- Proverbia (or Sententiae), a collection of 149 maxims
- Liber epigrammaton, a collection of 54 epigrams preserved in the Anthologia Salmasiana and Anthologia Vossiana, including the elegy De spe ("On Hope")
- Correspondence of Paul and Seneca, now generally thought to be spurious

In the 15th century, Alonso de Cartagena translated many Senecan and Pseudo-Senecan works into Castilian. Under the title Dichos de Séneca en el fecho de la cavallería he translated some excerpts from Vegetius's De re militari. Some of the Controversiae of Seneca the Elder were also mistaken for the Younger's and translated as Libro de las declamaciones.

At least some Pseudo-Senecan works do seem to preserve and adapt genuine Senecan content, for example, Martin of Braga's Formula vitae honestae ("Rules for an Honest Life"), also called De quattuor virtutibus ("On the Four [Cardinal] Virtues"). Early manuscripts preserve Martin's preface, where he makes it clear that this was his adaptation, but in later copies this was omitted, and the work was later thought to be fully Seneca's work. A collection of sayings from this work also circulated under Seneca's name under the title Copia verborum.
