= De re militari =

Treatise by Publius Flavius Vegetius Renatus

- "Concerning Military Matters"
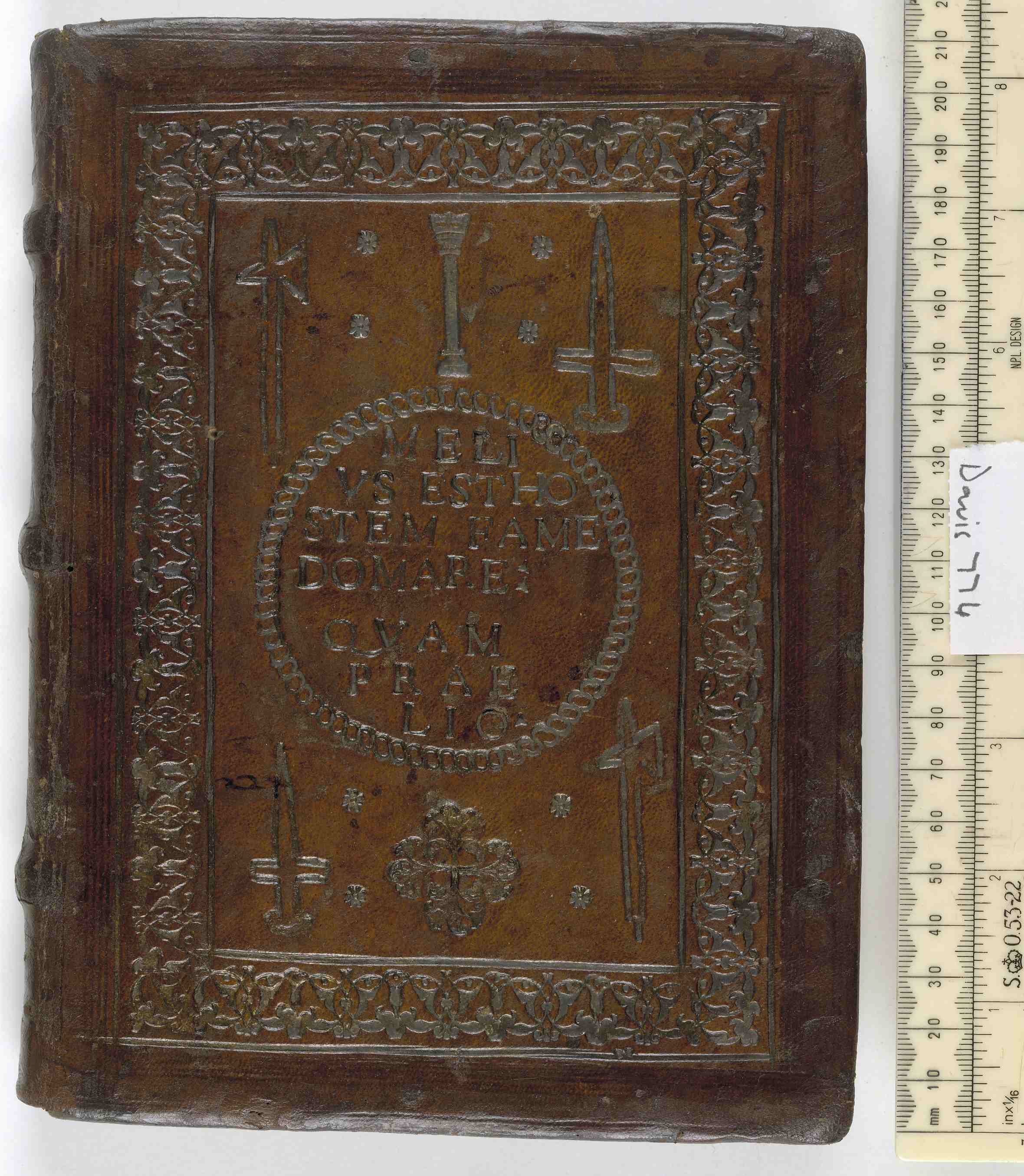
- A morocco bound copy of the 1494 edition
- Also known as: Epitoma rei militaris, Epitoma institutorum rei militaris
- Author(s): Publius Flavius Vegetius Renatus, though the work was revised a number of times afterwards
- Dedicated to: Emperor Valentinian
- Language: Late Latin
- Date: 383 x 450, possibly in the reign of Theodosius I (r. 378-395)
- First printed edition: Epithoma rei militaris. Utrecht, 1473.
- Genre: military treatise
- Subject: military leadership, training, discipline, tactics, logistics, organisation of the army, etc.
- Period covered: purports to describe the army in the heydays of the Roman Empire
- Sources: include Cato the Elder, Cornelius Celsus, Frontinus, Paternus, Imperial Constitutions of Augustus, Trajan, Hadrian

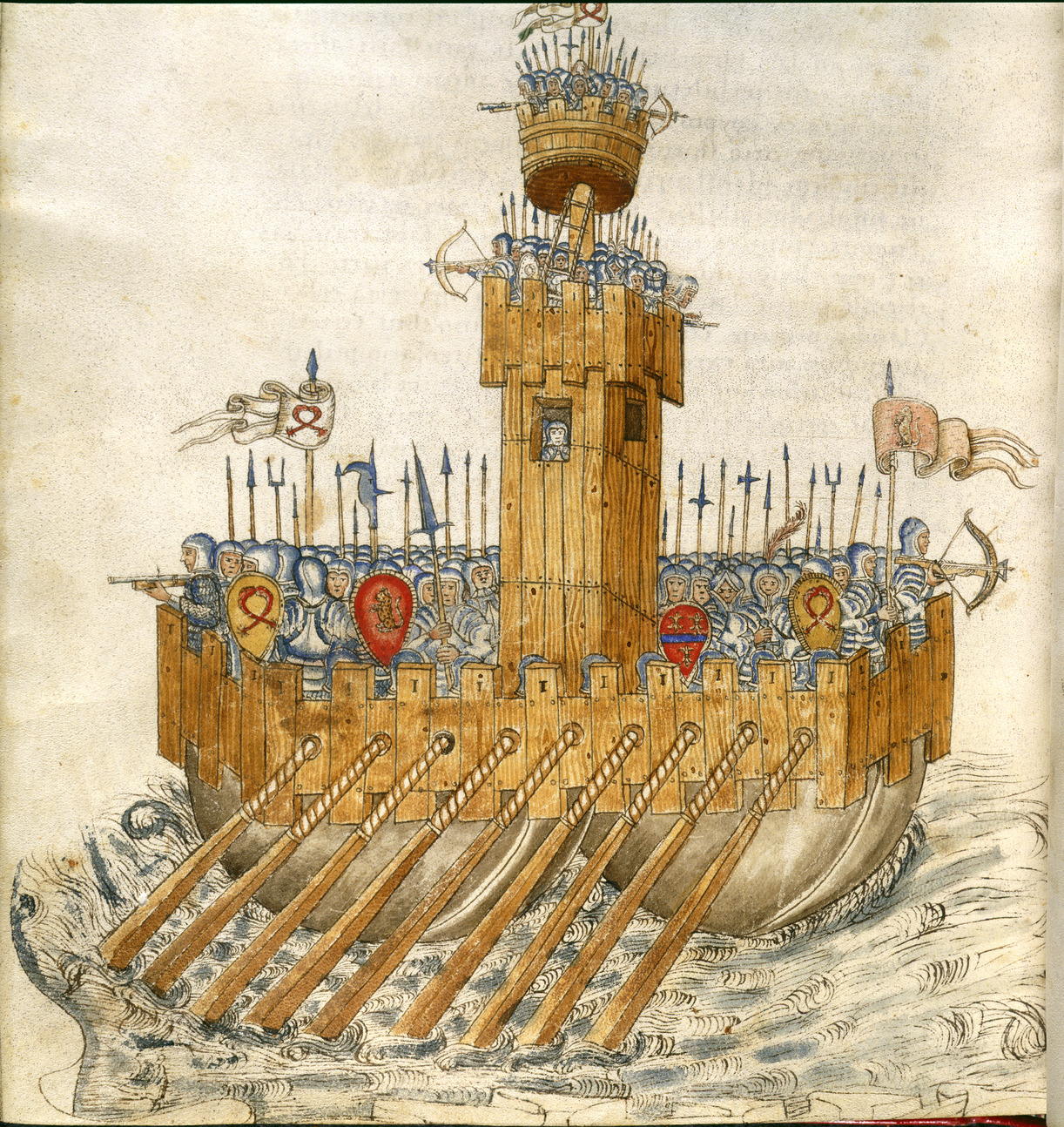
Ship with armed soldiers - De re militari (15th century), f.231v - BL Add MS 24945

De re militari (Latin "Concerning Military Matters"), also Epitoma rei militaris, is a treatise by the Late Latin writer Flavius Vegetius Renatus about Roman warfare and military principles as a presentation of the methods and practices in use during the height of the Roman Empire and responsible for its power. The extant text dates to the 5th century AD.

Vegetius emphasized things such as the training of soldiers as a disciplined force, orderly strategy, maintenance of supply lines and logistics, quality leadership and use of tactics and even deceit to ensure advantage over the opposition. He was concerned about selection of good soldiers and recommended hard training of at least four months before the soldier was accepted into the ranks. The leader of the army (dux) had to take care of the men under his command and keep himself informed about the movements of the enemy to gain advantage in the battle.

De re militari became a military guide in the Middle Ages. Even after the introduction of gunpowder to Europe, the work was carried by general officers and their staffs as a field guide to methods. Friends and subordinates customarily presented embellished copies as gifts to leaders. It went on into the 18th and 19th centuries as a source of policy and strategy to the major states of Europe. In that sense, De re militari is a projection of Roman civilization into modern times and a continuation of its influence on its cultural descendants.

Vegetius appears to have lacked personal military experience, and the accuracy about the claims he makes about the Late Roman army have been questioned by modern military historians.

== Authorship and composition ==
The author of De re militari was Publius Flavius Vegetius Renatus, who lived in the late 4th century and possibly the early 5th century AD. The name of the work has a number of variants, including Epitoma Rei Militaris, but there are other problems with accepting it at face value as the verbatim work of Vegetius. Some of the manuscripts have a note that the text was revised for the 7th time in Constantinople in the consulate of Valentinian, who must have been Valentinian III, reigning 425-455.

Vegetius' dates are not known, nor are the circumstances under which the work was revised. The year 450 is taken as the latest possible time the work could have been written, assuming he did all seven revisions in just a few years. The initial date of the window is established by Vegetius' own statement that he wrote covering the time usque ad tempus divi Gratiani, "up to the time of the divine Gratian." As emperors did not become gods generally until they died, the statement sets the initial possible date (terminus post quem) at 383, the year Gratian died. If the earlier date is preferred, it is unlikely Vegetius did all seven revisions or even one of them. There is no reason to question his general authorship, however.

The work is dedicated to a mysterious emperor, whose identity is unknown but whom Vegetius must have assumed to have been known to his intended readership. It may be that he wrote on behalf of military reform under the patronage of Theodosius I. In that case he would have been alive in the window 378-395, the dates of Theodosius' reign. This article adopts that point of view and assigns an approximate date of 390 to the work, which would not be, then, word for word the same as what Vegetius wrote, accounting for the title variants.

== Sources ==
Vegetius based his treatise on descriptions of Roman armies, especially those of the mid to late Republic. As G.R. Watson observes, Vegetius' Epitoma "is the only ancient manual of Roman military institutions to have survived intact." Despite this, Watson is dubious of its value, for he "was neither a historian nor a soldier: his work is a compilation carelessly constructed from material of all ages, a congeries of inconsistencies." These antiquarian sources, according to his own statement, were Cato the Elder, Cornelius Celsus, Frontinus, Paternus and the imperial constitutions of Augustus, Trajan and Hadrian (1.8).

== Contents of the treatise ==
Vegetius' epitome mainly focuses on military organisation and how to react to certain occasions in war. Vegetius explains how one should fortify and organise a camp, how to train troops, how to handle undisciplined troops, how to handle a battle engagement, how to march, formation gauge, and many other useful methods of promoting organisation and valour in the legion. The treatise is carefully laid out in subsections. They are organized into four books:

=== Book I ===
The first book, headed Primus liber electionem edocet iuniorum, ex quibus locis uel quales milites probandi sint aut quibus armorum exercitiis imbuendi [The first book will teach the choice of the young men, from what places, or what kind of soldiers they are to be tested, or with what exercises of arms they are to be imbued], explains the selection of recruits, from which places and what kinds (of men) are soldiers to be authorised and with what exercises of arms they are to be indoctrinated. Vegetius also describes in detail the organisation, training and equipment of the army of the early Empire. Portraying the military decadence of the Late Roman Empire, it is a plea for army reform.

In Book I Vegetius is keen to stress the shortcomings of the Roman Army in his lifetime. In order to do this he eulogises the army of the early Roman Empire. In particular he stresses the high standard of the milites and the excellence of the training and the officer corps. In reality, Vegetius probably describes an ideal rather than the reality. The Army of the early Empire was a formidable fighting force. Some argue that the army was not in its entirety quite as good as Vegetius describes. The reason given is that Vegetius says that recruits should be 5 Roman feet 10 inches tall (Epitoma 1.5), the equivalent of 172 cm. The average height of adult male skeletons buried in Italy between 500 BCE and 500 CE was 168 cm, so it would probably have been hard to meet Vegetius' height standards. But this is to misunderstand what he says, as in the same section the author is clear that height is one factor and other attributes are of equal value and make up for those who do not fit the height criteria

=== Book II ===
The second book, Secundus liber ueteris militiae continet morem, ad quem pedestris institui possit exercitus [The second book of ancient warfare contains the manner in which an army may be organized on foot.], contains traditional military practices with which infantry can be created.

=== Book III ===
The third book, Tertius liber omnia artium genera, quae terrestri proelio necessaria uidentur, exponit, "sets forth all types of arts that appear to be necessary for fighting on land." It concludes with a series of military maxims or "general rules of war" ("regulae bellorum generales," 3.26). While some scholars contend that these rules are later interpolations, others consider them to have been included at an early date. Some of these rules were translated into Greek in the Strategikon of Maurice, 8.2, and they became influential in western Europe, from Paul the Deacon to William the Silent, Machiavelli, and Frederick the Great. Some of the maxims may be mentioned here as illustrating the principles of a war for limited political objectives with which he deals:

- "All that is advantageous to the enemy is disadvantageous to you, and all that is useful to you, damages the enemy"
- "the main and principal point in war is to secure plenty of provisions for oneself and to destroy the enemy by famine. Famine is more terrible than the sword."
- "No man is to be employed in the field who is not trained and tested in discipline"
- "It is better to beat the enemy through want, surprises, and care for difficult places (i.e., through manoeuvre) than by a battle in the open field"
- "Let him who desires peace prepare for war," also paraphrased as si vis pacem, para bellum ("If you want peace, prepare for war")

The book also includes the "seven normal dispositions for battle" ("depugnationum septem...genera," 3.20 and summarized at 3.26.18-24).

=== Book IV ===
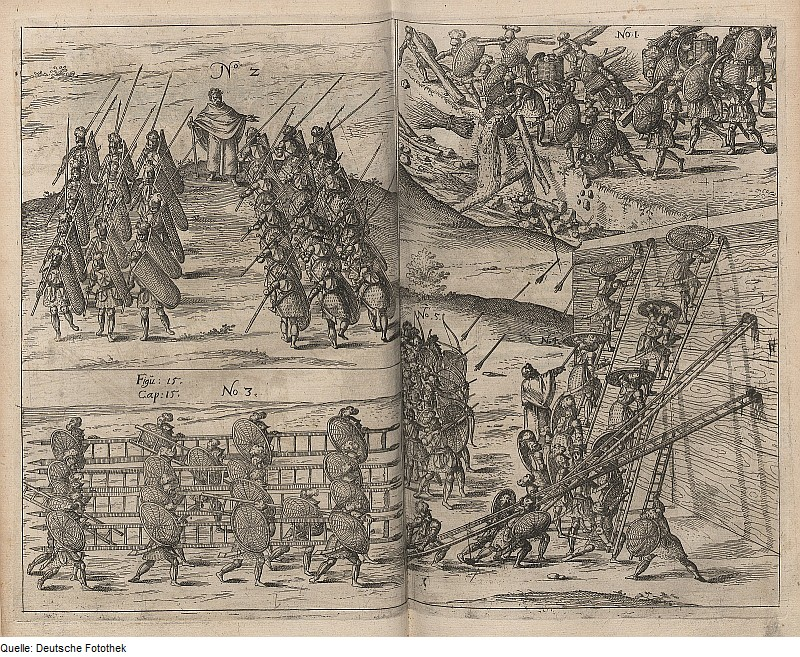
Storming fortress, illustrated in Johann Jacobi von Wallhausen's 1616 German translation

The fourth book, Quartus liber uniuersas machinas, quibus uel obpugnantur ciuitates uel defenduntur, enumerat; naualis quoque belli praecepta subnectit, enumerates "all the machines with which cities are besieged or defended" (chapters 1-30) and adds also the precepts of naval warfare (chapters 31-46). It contains the best description of siegecraft in the Late Roman Empire. From it, among other things, we learn details of the siege engine called the onager, which until recently was thought to have been common in medieval sieges. The onager was replaced by the Mangonel in the 6th Century AD.

== Transmission and reception ==
=== Title ===
The work is known by a number of variant titles. Here are some titles from among the incunabula, books printed before 1501:

- Epithoma (sic) rei militaris (1474)
- Epitoma de re militari (1475)
- Epitoma institutorum rei militaris (1487)
- Epitoma rei militaris (1488)
- De re militari (1496)

The common element of all the names are the two cases of res militaris (nominative case): rei militaris (genitive case) and re militari (ablative case). The classical form would have been the ablative. Vegetius uses epitomata, plural of the Greek epitoma, in his other surviving work on doctoring mules.

=== Influence ===
Heavily used in its own time, De re militari became a popular manual on warfare in the Middle Ages, especially between the 9th and 16th centuries, even if some of the information was unsuitable to later times and circumstances. N.P. Milner observes that it was "one of the most popular Latin technical works from Antiquity, rivalling the elder Pliny's Natural History in the number of surviving copies dating from before AD 1300."

The early English historian Bede cites Vegetius in his prose Life of St Cuthbert. The earliest extant manuscript from England to contain Vegetius' text is Cotton Cleopatra D.I (of the 11th, possibly late 10th century).

De re militari came to the forefront in the late Carolingian period through Hrabanus Maurus (d. 856), who used the text for his own manual De procinctu romanae miliciae [On the Preparations of the Roman Militia], composed for Lothair II of Lotharingia (r. 855-869). Vegetius was heavily excerpted in the tract Pulcher tractatus de materia belli of about 1300.

Vegetius' notes about siegecraft became especially obsolete when the technology advanced and gunpowder weapons such as cannon came into widespread use. Vegetius' suggestion of a soldier's religious oath to God and to the realm might have influenced knightly practices. Still, because of the lack of literacy, as a guide it was probably accessible only to aristocracy, clergy and royalty. Machiavelli very likely read Vegetius and incorporated many of his ideas into his own The Prince.

After the first printed editions, Vegetius' position as the premier military authority began to decline, as ancient historians such as Polybius became available. Niccolò Machiavelli attempted to address Vegetius's defects in his L'arte della Guerra (Florence, 1521), with heavy use of Polybius, Frontinus and Livy, but Justus Lipsius' accusation that he confused the institutions of diverse periods of the Roman Empire and G. Stewechius' opinion that the survival of Vegetius' work led to the loss of his named sources were more typical of the late Renaissance. While as late as the 18th century we find so eminent a soldier as Marshal Puysegur basing his own works on this acknowledged model, and the famous Prince de Ligne wrote "C'est un livre d'or" [This is a book of gold]. In Milner's words, Vegetius' work suffered "a long period of deepening neglect".

=== Translations ===
There are at least five French, five English, two Italian, two Catalan, two German and one Spanish translation from the late Middle Ages. The earliest vernacular translation was that of Mastre Richard into Anglo-Norman French in 1254–1272. A second French translation was made by Jean de Meun around 1284. Shortly thereafter, Jean Priorat versified Meun's translation. A third French prose translation, from Jean de Vignay, appeared about 1320. Two anonymous French translations appeared later in the 14th century. In the 15th century, Jean de Rovroy translated "some notable extracts" of Vegetius alongside his translation of Frontinus.

Four complete translations into Italian vernaculars appeared before 1500 as well as one translation of the first book. The earliest was a translation into Tuscan by the Florentine judge Bono Giamboni in 1292 for his patron, Manetto Scali. The Epythoma delli institute dell'arte militare, which is perhaps the best Italian translation, appeared around 1400. Its translator is unknown and it survives in a single manuscript. The third translation was completed by Venanzo Bruschino da Camerino in 1417 for Braccio da Montone. The fourth translation is anonymous, known only from a single manuscript from Siena.

English translations precede printed books. Manuscript 18A.Xii in the Royal Library, written and ornamented for Richard III of England, is a translation of Vegetius. It ends with a paragraph starting: "Here endeth the boke that clerkes clepethe in Latyne Vegecii de re militari." The paragraph goes on to date the translation to 1408. The translator is identified in Manuscript No. 30 of Magdalen College, Oxford, as John Walton, translator of Boethius in 1410. A second English translation, this time in verse, appeared between 1457 and 1460 from an anonymous parson of Calais. In 1494, Adam Loutfut translated some excerpts of Vegetius into Scots.

There may have been a Portuguese translation made in the 1430s, but it is not extant. Two early translations into Catalan survive each in a single manuscript. Owing to defects in the manuscript, the earlier of these, a direct translation from Latin, is not complete and nothing is known of its translator. The other, entitled Del mester darmes e dela art de cavalleria, was translated by the Valencian Jacme Castellà from a lost French intermediate. Jacme was active at the court of John I of Aragon (r. 1387–1396). A single Spanish (Castilian) translation was made around 1400 by the friar Alonso de San Cristóbal for King Henry III of Castile. It is preserved in six manuscripts. Alfonso included learned glosses for every chapter in book 1 and also for many other chapters. He also provided moralizing glosses that interpreted De re militari as advice for spiritual discipline. Alonso de Cartagena translated some excerpts from De re militari under the title Dichos de Séneca en el fecho de la cavallería, misattributing them to Seneca.

The first full German translation of Vegetius was produced anonymously at the University of Vienna in 1438 for King Albert II of Germany, who had previously had excerpts translated. It was not a strictly literal translation. A second German translation by Ludwig Hohenwang was printed at Ulm in 1475. It was dedicated to Count Johann II von Lupfen.

=== Manuscripts ===
After retirement English-French historian Christopher Allmand conducted an exhaustive survey of every known manuscript De Rei Militari. This involved visiting libraries and archive collections across Europe.

To the modern day, 226 Latin copies of the book have survived, not including translations to various other European languages. Many of them have a copious amount of personal notes on them, pointing at matters that have interested their contemporary owners.

=== Printed editions ===
The first printed editions are ascribed to Utrecht (1473), Cologne (1476), Paris (1478), Rome (in Veteres de re mil. scriptores, 1487), and Pisa (1488). An early English version (via French) was published by William Caxton in 1489.

=== Assessment by historians ===
Although the text was historically taken at face value during the Middle Ages and Renaissance, as an accurate contemporary work on the Roman army and as a valuable military manual, modern historians have questioned the accuracy of the claims that Vegetius made about the state of the Roman army in his time. According to Michael B. Charles "many details that he provides about the [Roman] military are simply wrong", and said that it was "doubtful" that he had any military experience, arguing that the work was "not meant to be an accurate exposition of Roman military history, or indeed [then] present-day military activities", and that only "small but nonetheless valuable nuggets" of information in the text are actually valuable for understanding the Late Roman Army. The work has also been criticised on stylistic grounds. Sydney Anglo stated that the work was "mediocre" and that "its coverage of Roman military institutions is derivative, patchy, inconsistent and repetitious", and that Vegetius blended information from vastly different time periods in an unclear and confused way, with Anglo stating that "Vegetius's account of Roman military usage was not so much anachronistic as extra-chronistic. It was outside any specific time."

== See also ==
- Strategikon of Maurice a 6th century Eastern Roman/Byzantine war manual, attributed to emperor Maurice.
- Byzantine military manuals
- The Art of War
