= Aelianus Tacticus =

2nd-century Greek military writer

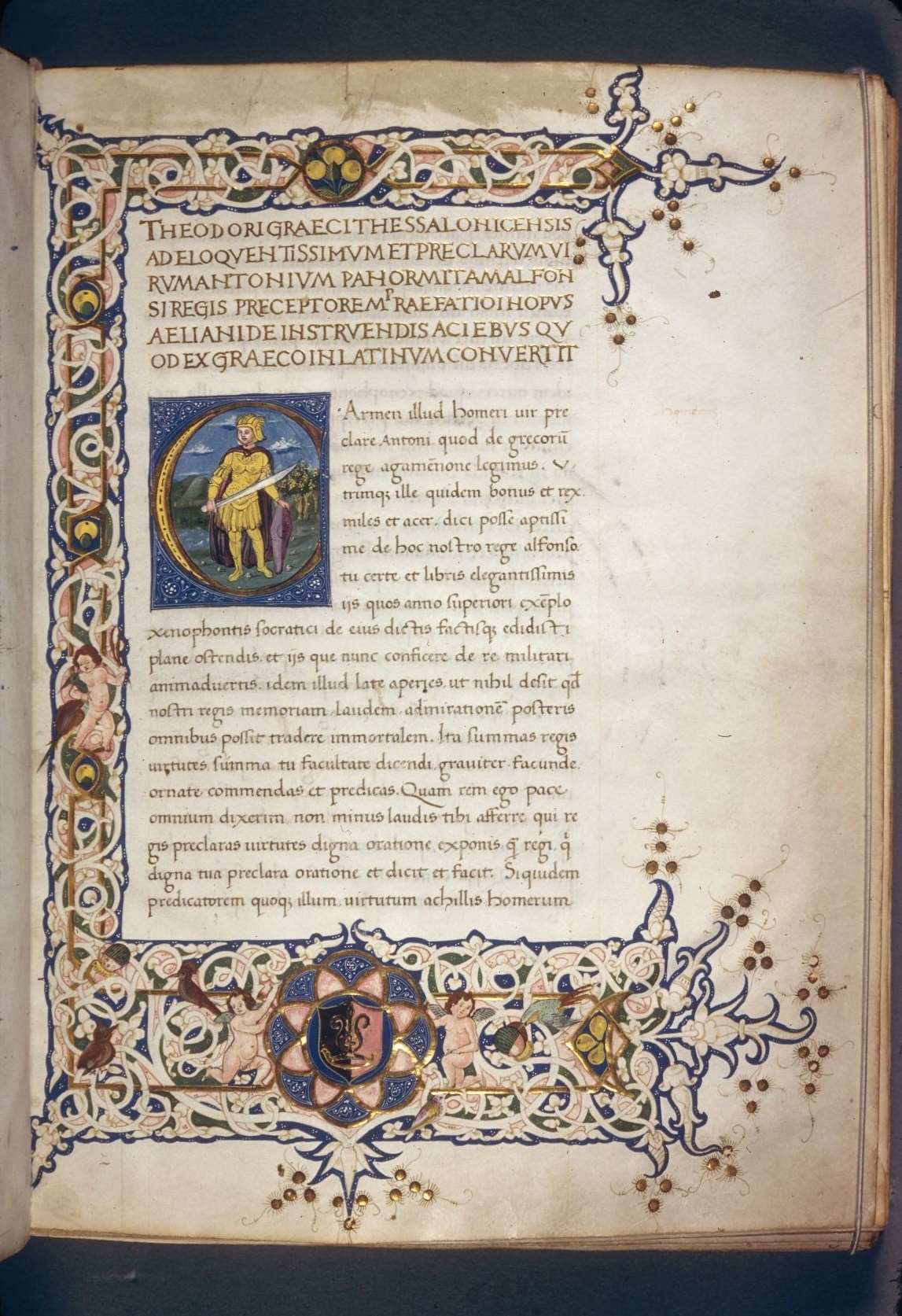
In hoc codice continentur Helianus De instruendis aciebus et Onosander De optimo imperatore, c. 1480, by Aelianus Tacticus

Aelianus Tacticus (Ancient Greek: Αἰλιανὸς ὀ Τακτικός; fl. 2nd century AD), also known as Aelian (/ˈiːliən/), was a Greek military writer who lived in Rome.

== Work ==
Aelian's military treatise in fifty-three chapters on the tactics of the Greeks, titled On Tactical Arrays of the Greeks (Περὶ Στρατηγικῶν Τάξεων Ἑλληνικῶν), is dedicated to the emperor Hadrian, though this is probably a mistake for Trajan, and the date 106 has been assigned to it. It is a handbook of Greek, i.e. Macedonian, drill and tactics as practiced by the Hellenistic successors of Alexander the Great. The author claims to have consulted all the best authorities, the most important of which was a lost treatise on the subject by Polybius. Perhaps the chief value of Aelian's work lies in his critical account of preceding works on the art of war, and in the fullness of his technical details in matters of drill.

Aelian also gives a brief account of the constitution of a Roman army at that time. The work arose, he says, from a conversation he had with the emperor Nerva at Frontinus's house at Formiae. He promises a work on Naval Tactics also; but this, if it was written, is lost.

Critics of the 18th century — Guichard Folard and the Prince de Ligne — were unanimous in thinking Aelian greatly inferior to Arrian, but Aelian exercised a great influence both on his immediate successors, the Byzantines, and later on the Arabs, (who translated the text for their own use). The author of the Strategikon ascribed to the emperor Maurice selectively used Aelian's work as a conceptional model, especially its preface. Emperor Leo VI the Wise incorporated much of Aelian's text in his own Taktika. The Arabic version of Aelian was made about 1350. It was first translated into Latin by Theodore Gaza, published at Rome in 1487. The Greek editio princeps was edited by Francesco Robortello and published at Venice in 1552.

In spite of its academic nature, the copious details to be found in the treatise rendered it of the highest value to the army organisers of the 16th century, who were engaged in fashioning a regular military system out of the semi-feudal systems of previous generations. The Macedonian phalanx of Aelian had many points of resemblance to the solid masses of pikemen and the squadrons of cavalry of the Spanish and Dutch systems, and the translations made in the 16th century formed the groundwork of numerous books on drill and tactics.

The first significant reference to the influence of Aelian in the 16th century is a letter to Maurice of Nassau, Prince of Orange from his cousin William Louis, Count of Nassau-Dillenburg on December 8, 1594. The letter is influential in supporting the thesis of the early-modern Military Revolution. In the letter, William Louis discusses the use of ranks by soldiers of Imperial Rome as discussed in Aelian's Tactica. Aelian was discussing the use of the counter march in the context of the Roman sword gladius and spear pilum. William Louis in a 'crucial leap' realised that the same technique could work for men with firearms.

== Sources ==
- Aelian (September 2010). Henry Augustus (ed.). The Tactics of Aelian. London: Cox and Baylis (published 1814). ISBN 9781169788312.
