= Vegetius =

Roman author

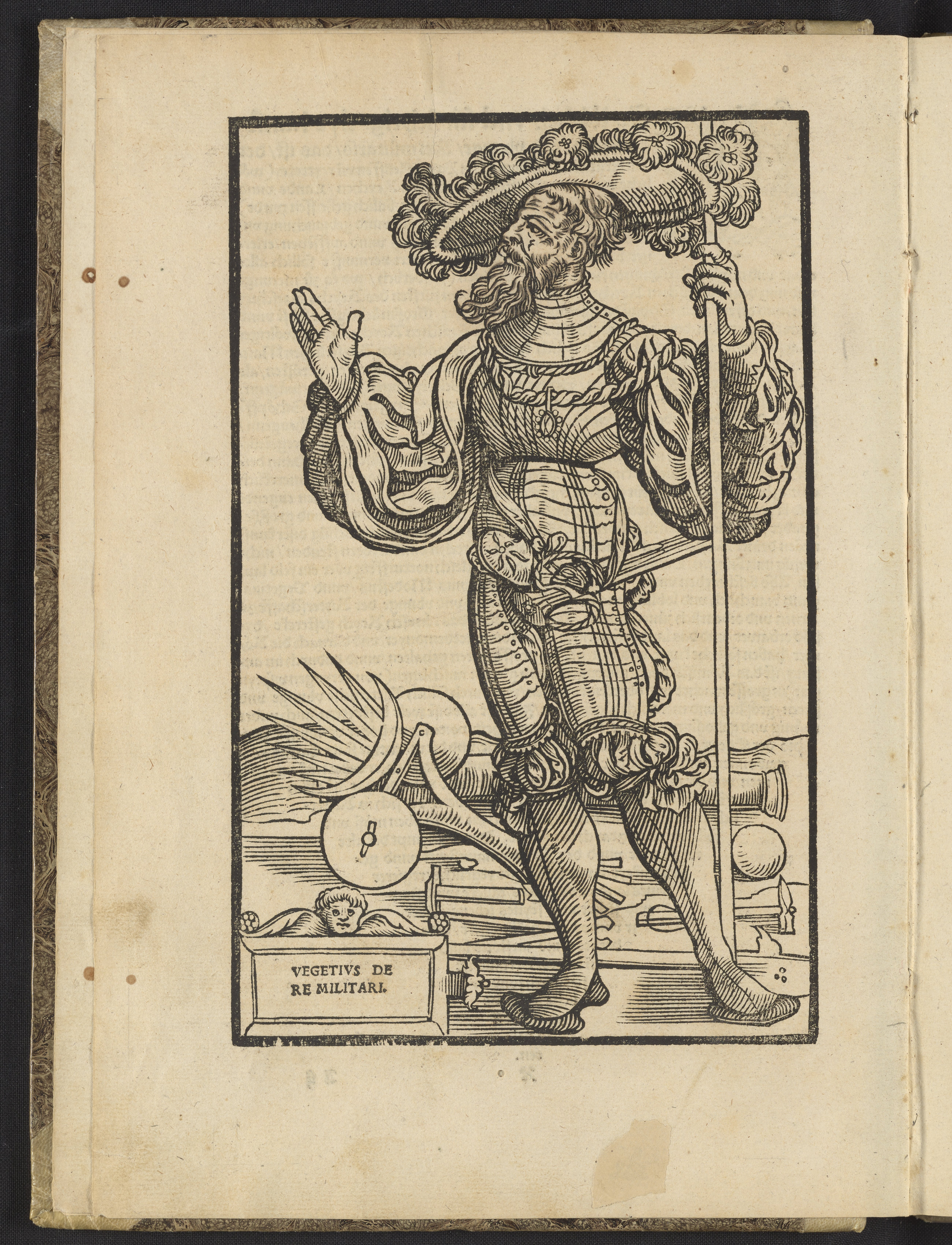
- Fanciful portrait from a 1529 edition
- Born: 4th century AD
- Died: After 383
- Citizenship: Roman Empire
- Writing career
- Language: Latin
- Subjects: Military affairs, Veterinary medicine
- Notable work: De re militari

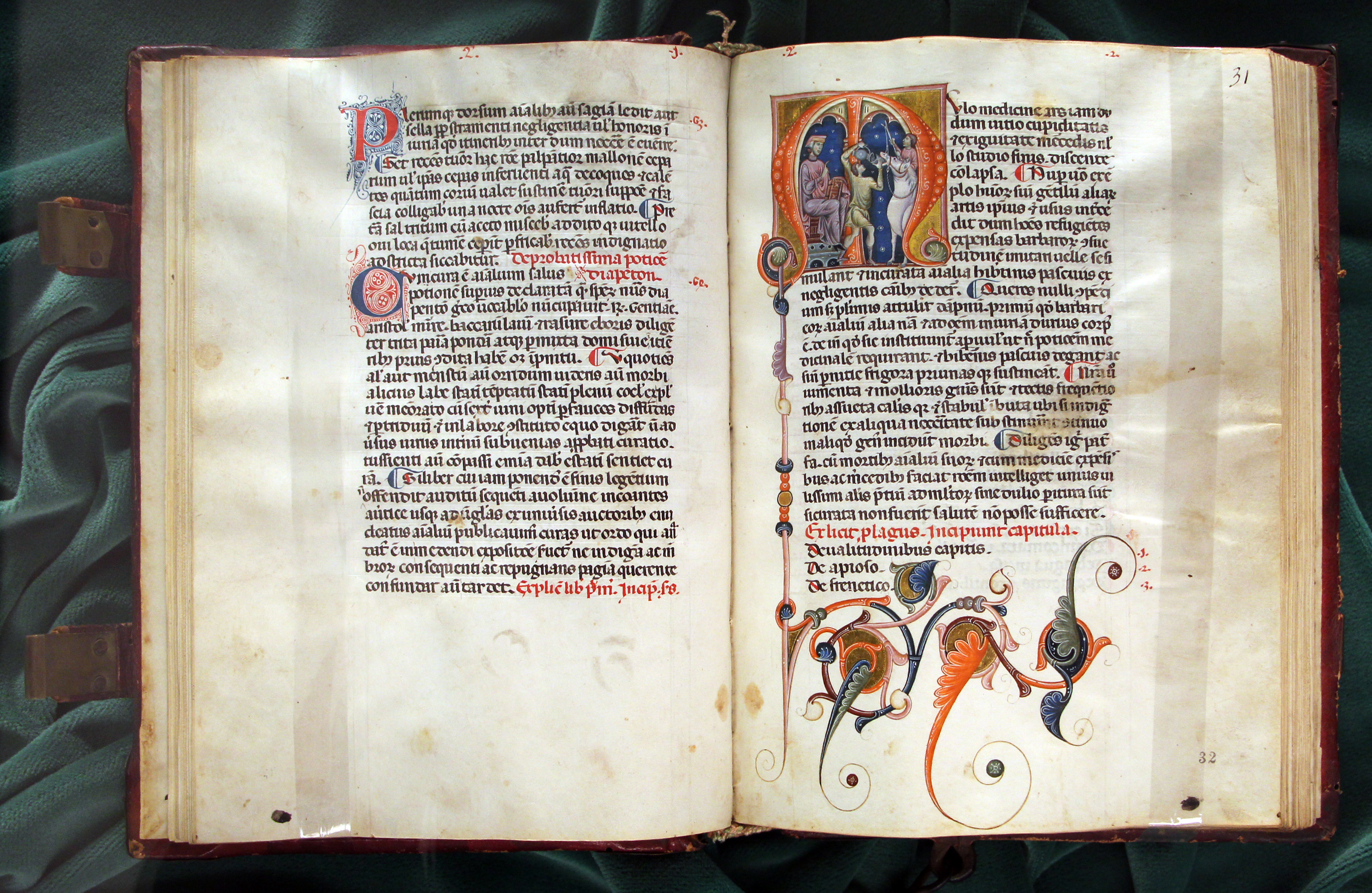
Mulomedicina (1250-1375 ca., Biblioteca Medicea Laurenziana, pluteo 45.19)

Publius (or Flavius) Vegetius Renatus, known as Vegetius (Latin: [u̯ɛˈɡɛtiʊs]), was a writer of the Later Roman Empire (late 4th century). Nothing is known of his life or station beyond what is contained in his two surviving works: Epitoma rei militaris (also referred to as De re militari), and the lesser-known Digesta Artis Mulomedicinae, a guide to veterinary medicine. He identifies himself in the opening of his work Epitoma rei militaris as a Christian.

== Dating of work ==
The latest event alluded to in his Epitoma rei militaris is the death of the Emperor Gratian (383); the earliest attestation of the work is a subscriptio by Flavius Eutropius, writing in Constantinople in 450, which appears in one of two families of manuscripts, suggesting that a division of the manuscript tradition had already occurred. Despite Eutropius' location in Constantinople, the scholarly consensus is that Vegetius wrote in the Western Roman Empire. Vegetius dedicates his work to the reigning emperor, who is identified as Theodosius, ad Theodosium imperatorem, in the manuscript family that was not edited in 450; the identity is disputed: some scholars identify him with Theodosius I (r. 379–395), while others follow Otto Seeck and identify him with the later Valentinian III, dating the work to 430–35. Goffart agrees that the later date is likely, suggesting that the work may have been intended to support a military revival in the time of Aetius's supremacy. Rosenbaum also argues that he wrote in the early 430s; Theodosius II might then have been the dedicatee. Rosenbaum uses allusions from Vegetius's works and relationships to the work of Merobaudes to suggest that Vegetius was a senior court official, primiscrinius to the praetorian prefect, who had been an agens in rebus.

== Epitoma rei militaris ==
Vegetius' epitome mainly focuses on military organization and how to react to certain occasions in war. Vegetius explains how one should fortify and organize a camp, how to train troops, how to handle undisciplined troops, how to handle a battle engagement, how to march, formation gauge and many other useful methods of promoting organization and valour in the legion.

As G. R. Watson observes, Vegetius' Epitoma "is the only ancient manual of Roman military institutions to have survived intact". Despite this, Watson doubts its value, for Vegetius "was neither a historian nor a soldier: his work is a compilation carelessly constructed from material of all ages, a congeries of inconsistencies". These antiquarian sources, according to his own statement, were Cato the Elder, Cornelius Celsus, Frontinus, Paternus and the imperial constitutions of Augustus, Trajan, and Hadrian (1.8).

The first book is a plea for army reform; it vividly portrays the military decadence of the Late Roman Empire. Vegetius also describes in detail the organisation, training and equipment of the army of the early Empire. The third book contains a series of military maxims, which were (appropriately enough, considering the similarity in the military conditions of the two ages) the foundation of military learning for every European commander from William the Silent to Frederick the Great.

His book on siegecraft contains the best description of Late Empire and Medieval siege machines. Among other things, it shows details of the siege engine called the onager, which afterwards played a great part in sieges until the development of modern cannonry. The fifth book gives an account of the materiel and personnel of the Roman navy.

According to the Encyclopædia Britannica Eleventh Edition, "In manuscript, Vegetius' work had a great vogue from its first advent. Its rules of siegecraft were much studied in the Middle Ages." N.P. Milner observes that it was "one of the most popular Latin technical works from Antiquity, rivalling the elder Pliny's Natural History in the number of surviving copies dating from before AD 1300." It was translated into English, French (by Jean de Meun and others), Italian (by the Florentine judge Bono Giamboni and others), Catalan, Spanish, Czech, and Yiddish before the invention of printing. The first printed editions are ascribed to Utrecht (1473), Cologne (1476), Paris (1478), Rome (in Veteres de re mil. scriptores, 1487), and Pisa (1488). A German translation by Ludwig Hohenwang appeared at Ulm in 1475.

However, from that point Vegetius' position as the premier military authority began to decline, as ancient historians such as Polybius became available. Niccolò Machiavelli attempted to address Vegetius' defects in his L'arte della Guerra (Florence, 1521), with heavy use of Polybius, Frontinus, and Livy, but Justus Lipsius' accusation that he confused the institutions of diverse periods of the Roman Empire and G. Stewechius' opinion that the survival of Vegetius' work led to the loss of his named sources were more typical of the late Renaissance. While as late as the 18th century a soldier such as Marshal Puysegur based his own works on this acknowledged model, in Milner's words, Vegetius' work suffered "a long period of deepening neglect".

== Translations ==
- Military Institutions of Vegetius, translated with a preface and notes by Lieutenant John Clarke, London, 1767. Abridged reprint (Books IV and V omitted): The Military Institutions of the Romans, Military Service Publishing Company, Harrisburg, Pa.. 1944.
- Vegetius: Epitome of Military Science, translated with notes and introduction by N.P. Milner, Translated Texts for Historians, Vol. 16, Liverpool: Liverpool University Press, 1993. (Second edition 1996; second revised edition 2011.)
- Het Romeinse leger, Dutch translation by Fik Meijer, Polak/Van gennep Publishers, Amsterdam, 2004.
