= Byzantine navy =

Naval force of the Byzantine Empire

- The imperial ensign (basilikon phlamoulon) with the tetragrammic cross, carried by Byzantine warships in the 14th century, as described by Pseudo-Kodinos and illustrated in the Castilian atlas Conosçimiento de todos los reynos (c. 1350)
- Leaders: Byzantine Emperor (Commander-in-chief); droungarios tou ploïmou and thematic strategoi (8th–11th centuries), megas doux (after c. 1092)
- Dates active: 330–1453
- Headquarters: Constantinople
- Active regions: Mediterranean Sea, Danube, Black Sea, Red Sea
- Size: c. 42,000 men in 899. c. 300 warships in 9th–10th centuries. c. 150 warships under Manuel Komnenos.
- Part of: Byzantine Empire
- Wars: the Justinianic Wars, latter half of the Roman–Persian Wars, the Arab–Byzantine wars, the Byzantine–Bulgarian wars, the Rus'–Byzantine wars, the Byzantine–Norman wars, the Crusades and the Byzantine–Ottoman wars

The Byzantine navy was the naval force of the Byzantine Empire. Like the state it served, it was a direct continuation from its Roman predecessor, but played a far greater role in the defence and survival of the state than its earlier iteration. While the fleets of the Roman Empire faced few great naval threats, operating as a policing force vastly inferior in power and prestige to the army, command of the sea became vital to the very existence of the Byzantine state, which several historians have called a "maritime empire".

The first threat to Roman hegemony in the Mediterranean Sea was posed by the Vandals in the 5th century. The re-establishment of a permanently maintained fleet and the introduction of the dromon galley in the same period also marks the point when the Byzantine navy began developing its own characteristic identity, a process furthered with the onset of the early Muslim conquests in the 7th century. Following the loss of the Levant and later Africa, the Mediterranean was transformed from a "Roman lake" into a battleground between the Byzantines and a series of Muslim states. The Byzantine fleets proved critical, not only for the defence of the Empire's possessions around the Mediterranean basin, but also for repelling attacks against the capital, Constantinople. Through the use of the newly invented "Greek fire", the navy's famous weapon, Constantinople was saved from several sieges and numerous naval engagements resulted in Byzantine victories.

Initially, the defence of the Byzantine coasts was borne by the great fleet of the Karabisianoi. Progressively however it was split up into several regional fleets, while a central Imperial Fleet was maintained at Constantinople to guard the city and form the core of naval expeditions. By the late 8th century, the Byzantine navy was again the dominant maritime power in the Mediterranean. Conflicts with navies of the Muslim world continued with varying success, but in the 10th century, the Byzantines were able to regain supremacy in the Eastern Mediterranean.

During the 11th century, the navy, like the Empire itself, began to decline. The Byzantines were increasingly forced to rely on the navies of Italian city-states such as Venice and Genoa, with disastrous effects on the Empire's economy and sovereignty. A period of recovery under the Komnenos dynasty was followed by another period of decline, which culminated in the disastrous dissolution of the Empire by the Fourth Crusade in 1204. After the Empire was restored in 1261, several Palaiologan emperors attempted to revive the navy, but their efforts only had a temporary effect. Emperor Andronikos II Palaiologos even dissolved the navy completely, allowing Venice to defeat the Byzantines in two wars. By the mid-14th century, the Byzantine fleet was limited to a few dozen ships at best, and control of the Aegean Sea had passed to Italian navies and, in the 15th century, the nascent Ottoman Navy. The diminished Byzantine navy continued to be active until the fall of Constantinople to the Ottoman Empire in 1453.

== Operational history ==
=== Early period ===
==== Civil wars and barbarian invasions: the 4th and 5th centuries ====
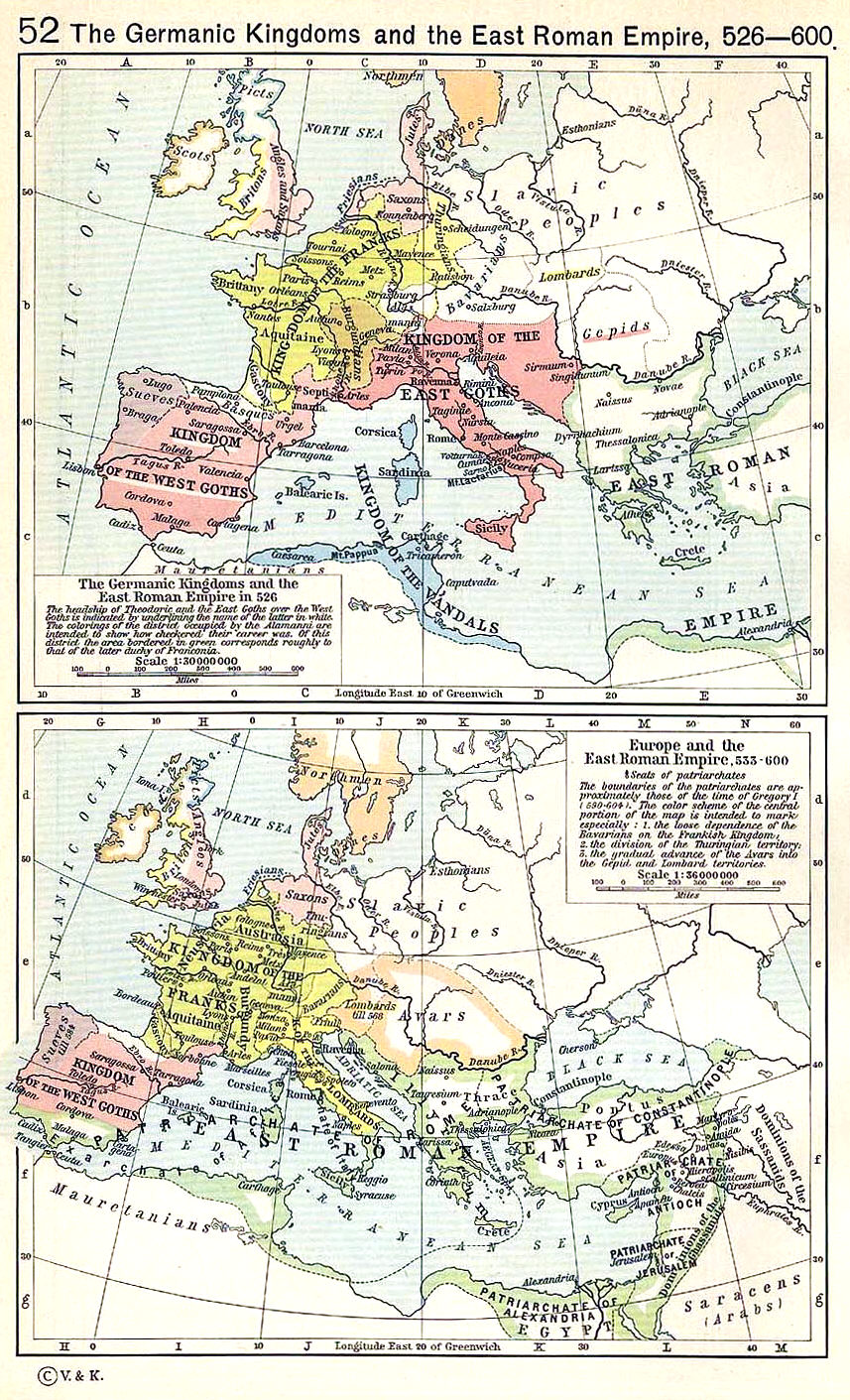
By the late 5th century, the Western Mediterranean had fallen into the hands of barbarian kingdoms. The conquests of Justinian I restored Roman control over the entire sea, which would last until the Muslim conquests in the latter half of the 7th century.

The Byzantine navy, like the Eastern Roman or Byzantine Empire itself, continued the systems of the Roman Empire. After the Battle of Actium in 31 BC, in the absence of any external threat in the Mediterranean, the Roman navy, composed of relatively small vessels, performed mostly policing and escort duties. By the early 4th century AD, the permanent Roman fleets had dwindled, so that when the fleets of the rival emperors Constantine the Great and Licinius clashed in 324 AD, they were composed to a great extent of newly built or -commandeered ships. The civil wars of the 4th and early 5th centuries did spur a revival of naval activity, with fleets mostly employed to transport armies.

Rome's mastery of the Mediterranean was challenged when Africa was overrun by the Vandals (429 to 442). The new Vandalic Kingdom of Carthage, under the capable Geiseric (r. 428–477), immediately launched raids against the coasts of Italy and Greece, even sacking and plundering Rome in 455. The Vandal raids continued unabated over the next two decades. The Western Empire was impotent, its navy having dwindled to almost nothing, but the eastern emperors could still call upon the resources of the eastern Mediterranean. A first Eastern expedition in 448, however, went no further than Sicily, and in 460, the Vandals attacked and destroyed a Western Roman invasion fleet at Cartagena in Spain. Finally, in 468, a huge Eastern expedition assembled under Basiliscus, reputedly numbering 1,113 ships and 100,000 men, failed disastrously. The financial cost of 130,000 pounds of gold and 700,000 pounds of silver nearly bankrupted the Empire. This forced the Romans to sign a peace treaty with Geiseric, but after Geiseric's death in 477, the Vandal threat receded.

==== Sixth century – Justinian restores Roman control over the Mediterranean ====
The 6th century marked the rebirth of Roman naval power. In 508, as antagonism with the Ostrogothic Kingdom of Theodoric flared up, the Emperor Anastasius I (r. 491–518) is reported to have sent a fleet of 100 warships to raid the coasts of Italy. In 513, the general Vitalian revolted against Anastasius. The rebels assembled a fleet of 200 ships which, despite some initial successes, were destroyed by admiral Marinus, who employed a sulphur-based incendiary substance to defeat them.

In 533, an army of 15,000 under Belisarius was transported to Africa by an invasion fleet of 92 dromons and 500 transports, beginning the Vandalic War, the first of Emperor Justinian I (r. 527–565)'s wars of reconquest. These were largely amphibious operations, made possible by the control of the Mediterranean waterways, and the fleet played a vital role in carrying supplies and reinforcements to the widely dispersed Byzantine expeditionary forces and garrisons. In 535, the Gothic War began with a double-pronged Byzantine offensive. Byzantine control of the sea was again of great strategic importance, allowing the smaller Byzantine army to successfully occupy the Italian peninsula by 540.

This fact was not lost on the Byzantines' enemies. Theodoric had planned to build a massive fleet directed against the Byzantines and the Vandals, but his death in 526 limited the extent to which these plans were realized. In 541 however, the new Ostrogoth king, Totila, assembled a fleet of 400 warships with which to deny the seas around Italy to the Empire. Two Byzantine fleets were destroyed near Naples in 542, and in 546, Belisarius personally commanded 200 ships against the Gothic fleet that blockaded the mouths of the Tiber, in an unsuccessful effort to relieve Rome. In 550, Totila invaded Sicily, and over the next year, his 300-ship fleet captured Sardinia and Corsica, and raided Corfu and the coast of Epirus. However, a defeat in a sea battle off Sena Gallica marked the beginning of the final Imperial ascendancy. With the final conquest of Italy and southern Spain under Justinian, the Mediterranean once again became a "Roman lake".

Despite the subsequent loss of much of Italy to the Lombards, the Byzantines maintained control of the seas around the peninsula. As the Lombards rarely ventured to sea, the Byzantines were able to retain several coastal strips of Italian territory for centuries. The only major naval action of the next 80 years occurred during the siege of Constantinople by the Sassanid Persians, Avars and Slavs in 626. During that siege, the Slavs' fleet was intercepted by the Byzantine fleet and destroyed, denying the Persian army passage across the Bosporus and eventually forcing the Avars to retreat.

=== Struggle against the Arabs ===
==== Emergence of the Arab naval threat ====
Map of the main Byzantine-Muslim naval operations and battles in the Mediterranean, 7th–11th centuries.

During the 640s, the Muslim conquest of Syria and Egypt created a new threat to Byzantium. The Arabs conquered significant recruiting and revenue-producing areas and quickly began assembling a navy of their own. The Muslim elite largely relied on the resources and manpower of the conquered Levant (especially the Copts of Egypt), which until a few years previously had provided ships and crews for the Byzantines. Given a largely shared nautical nomenclature, and the centuries-long interaction between the two cultures, Byzantine and Arab ships shared many similarities. This similarity also extended to tactics and general fleet organization; translations of Byzantine military manuals were available to the Arab admirals.

"At that time Kallinikos, an artificer from Heliopolis, fled to the Romans. He had devised a sea fire which ignited the Arab ships and burned them with all hands. Thus it was that the Romans returned with victory and discovered the sea fire."

— Chronicle of Theophanes the Confessor, Annus Mundi 6165.

After seizing Cyprus in 649 and raiding Rhodes, Crete and Sicily, the young Arab navy decisively defeated the Byzantines in the Battle of the Masts of 655. This catastrophic Byzantine defeat opened up the Mediterranean to the Arabs. From the reign of Muawiyah I (661–680), raids intensified, as preparations were made for a great assault on Constantinople itself. In the long first Arab siege of Constantinople, the Byzantine fleet proved instrumental to the survival of the Empire, defeating the Arab fleets with its newly-developed secret weapon: "Greek fire". The Muslim advance was halted, and an agreement to a thirty-year truce concluded soon after.

In the 680s, Justinian II (r. 685–695, 705–711) paid attention to the navy, strengthening it by resettling over 18,500 Mardaites along the southern coasts of the Empire, where they were employed as marines and rowers. Nevertheless, the Arab naval threat intensified as they gradually took control of North Africa in the 680s and 690s. The last Byzantine stronghold, Carthage, fell in 698, although a Byzantine naval expedition managed to briefly retake it. Thus, from the early 8th century on, Muslim raids unfolded unceasingly against Byzantine holdings in the Western Mediterranean, especially Sicily.

==== Byzantine counter-offensive ====
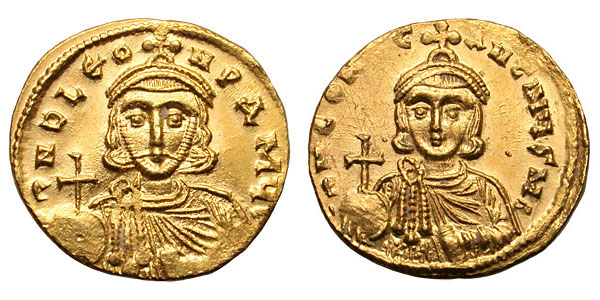
Emperor Leo III the Isaurian and his son and successor, Constantine V. Together, they spearheaded a revival of Byzantine fortunes against the Arabs, but also caused great internal strife because of their iconoclastic policies.

The Byzantines were unable to respond effectively to the Muslim advance in Africa because the two decades between 695 and 715 were a period of great domestic turmoil. They did react with raids of their own in the East, such as one in 709 against Egypt which captured the local admiral, but they also were aware of a coming onslaught, as Caliph al-Walid I (r. 705–715) readied his forces for a renewed assault against Constantinople. Under Leo III (r. 717–741, the capital faced a second Arab siege. The use of Greek fire was again instrumental in the Byzantine victory by devastating the enemy fleet.

In the aftermath of the siege, Byzantine forces launched a counter-offensive, with a fleet sacking Laodicea and an army driving the Arabs from Asia Minor. For the next three decades, naval warfare featured constant raids from both sides, with the Byzantines launching repeated attacks against the Muslim naval bases in Syria (Laodicea), and Egypt (Damietta and Tinnis). In 727, a revolt of the provincial thematic fleets was put down by the imperial fleet through the use of Greek fire. Despite the losses this entailed, some 390 warships were reportedly sent to attack Damietta in 739, and in 746 the Byzantines decisively defeated the Alexandrian fleet at Keramaia in Cyprus, breaking the naval power of the Umayyad Caliphate. The Byzantines followed this up with the destruction of the North African flotillas and coupled their successes at sea with severe trading limitations imposed on Muslim traders. After the collapse of the Umayyad state shortly thereafter, the Byzantine navy was left as the sole organized naval force in the Mediterranean. Thus, during the latter half of the 8th century, the Byzantines enjoyed a second period of complete naval superiority.

These successes enabled Emperor Constantine V (r. 741–775) to shift the fleet from the Mediterranean to the Black Sea during his campaigns against the Bulgars in the 760s. In 763, a fleet of 800 ships sailed to Anchialus, where he scored a significant victory, but in 766, a second fleet, allegedly of 2,600 ships, again bound for Anchialus, sank en route. At the same time, however, the Isaurian emperors undermined Byzantium's naval strength: with the Arab threat gone, and with the largely iconodule naval themes staunchly opposed to their iconoclastic policies, the emperors downgraded the navy's size and importance.

==== Renewed Muslim ascendancy ====
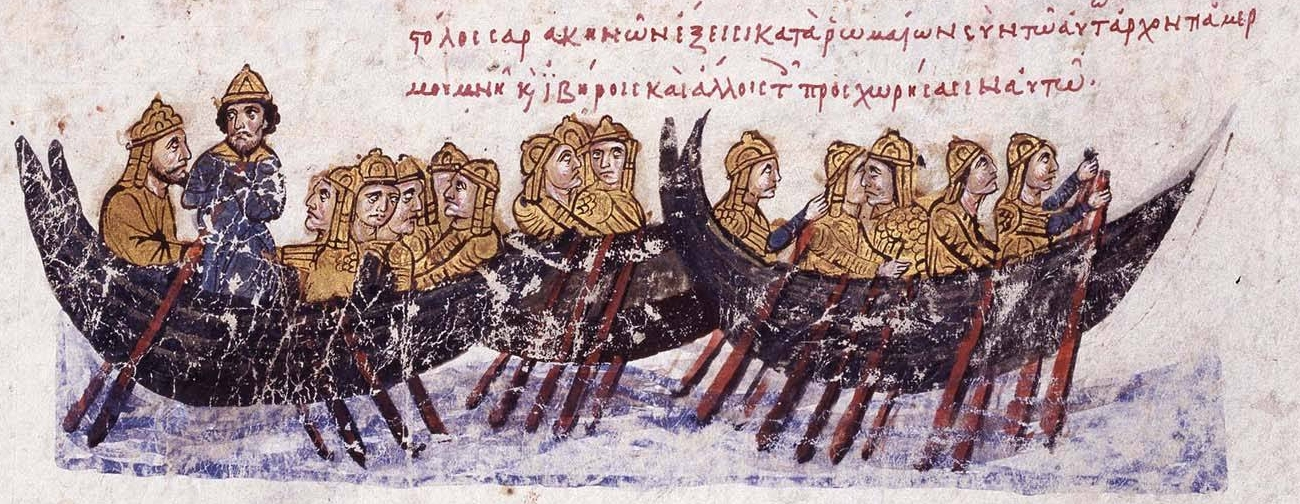
The Saracen pirate fleet sails towards Crete. From the Madrid Skylitzes manuscript.

The Byzantine naval predominance lasted until a succession of defeats at the hands of the resurgent Muslim fleets of the Abbasid Caliphate in the early 9th century. In 790, the Byzantines had suffered a major defeat in the Gulf of Antalya, and raids against Cyprus and Crete recommenced during the reign of Harun al-Rashid (786–809). Around the Mediterranean, new powers were rising. In 803, the Pax Nicephori recognized the de facto independence of Byzantine Venice, while at the same time in Ifriqiya, the new Aghlabid dynasty was established, which immediately engaged in raids throughout the central Mediterranean.

The Byzantines, on the other hand, were weakened by a series of defeats against the Bulgars, followed in 820 by the Revolt of Thomas the Slav, which attracted the support of a large part of the Byzantine armed forces, including the thematic fleets. The revolt severely depleted the Empire's defences. As a result, Crete fell between 824 and 827 to a band of Andalusian exiles. Numerous Byzantine recovery attempts failed, and the island became a base for Muslim piratical activity in the Aegean, radically upsetting the balance of power in the region. Despite some Byzantine successes, and the razing of Damietta by a Byzantine fleet of 85 ships in 853, Arab naval power in the Levant was steadily reviving under Abbasid rule.

"During that time [...] the Muslims gained control over the whole Mediterranean. Their power and domination over it was vast. The Christian nations could do nothing against the Muslim fleets, anywhere in the Mediterranean. All the time, the Muslims rode its wave for conquest."

— Ibn Khaldun, Muqaddimah, III.32

The situation was even worse in the West. A critical blow was inflicted on the Empire in 827, as the Aghlabids began conquering Sicily, aided by the defection of the island's thematic fleet. In 838, the Muslims crossed over into Italy, taking Taranto, Brindisi, and Bari. Venetian operations against them were unsuccessful, and throughout the 840s, the Arabs freely raided Italy and the Adriatic. Two large-scale Byzantine attempts to recover Sicily were heavily defeated in 840 and 859. By 850, the Muslim fleets, together with large numbers of independent ghazi raiders, had emerged as the major power of the Mediterranean, putting the Byzantines and the Christians in general on the defensive. The same period also saw the emergence of a new threat, the Rus'.

=== Byzantine Reconquest: the era of the Macedonian dynasty ===
During the course of the later 9th and the 10th century, as the Caliphate fractured into smaller states and Arab power became weakened, the Byzantines launched a series of successful campaigns against them. This "Byzantine Reconquest" was overseen by the able sovereigns of the Macedonian dynasty (867–1056).

==== Reign of Basil I ====
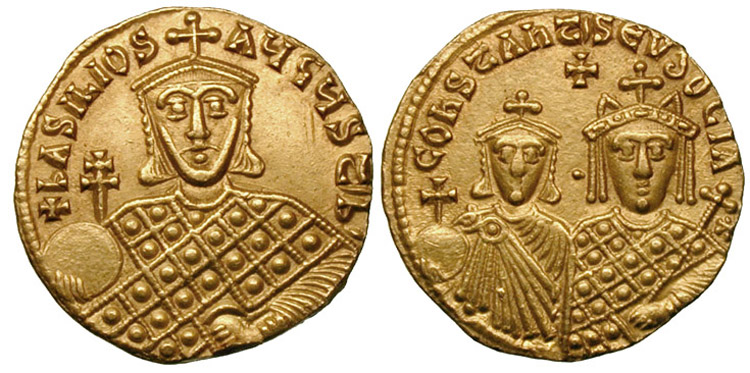
Gold solidus of Emperor Basil I the Macedonian. His patronage of the fleet resulted in several successes and was long remembered by the sailors, forming strong ties of loyalty to the Macedonian dynasty that was felt up until the reign of his grandson, Constantine VII.

Emperor Basil I (867–886) embarked on an aggressive foreign policy. Continuing the policies of his predecessor, Michael III (842–867), he showed great care to the fleet and successive victories followed. In 868, a fleet under the droungarios tou ploïmou Niketas Ooryphas relieved Ragusa from an Arab siege and re-established Byzantine presence in the area. A few years later, he twice heavily defeated the Cretan pirates at Kardia and in the Corinthian Gulf, temporarily securing the Aegean. Cyprus also was temporarily recovered and Bari occupied. At the same time, however, the Muslim presence in Cilicia was strengthened, and Tarsos became a major base for land and seaborne attacks against Byzantine territory, especially under the famed emir Yazaman al-Khadim (882–891).

In the West, the Muslims continued to make steady advances, as the local Byzantine forces proved inadequate: the Empire was forced to rely on the aid of their nominal Italian subjects, and had to resort to the transfer of the eastern fleets to Italy to achieve any progress. Following the fall of Enna in 855, the Byzantines were confined to the eastern shore of Sicily. Syracuse, the main Byzantine stronghold in Sicily, was attacked in 869, and in 870, Malta fell to the Aghlabids. Muslim corsairs raided the Adriatic, and in the early 880s established bases along the western Italian coast. In 878, Syracuse fell, largely because the Imperial Fleet was occupied with transporting marble for the construction of the Nea Ekklesia, Basil's new church. In 880, Ooryphas' successor, the droungarios Nasar, scored a significant victory in a night battle over the Aghlabids who were raiding the Ionian Islands. He then raided Sicily, carrying off much booty, before defeating another Muslim fleet off Punta Stilo. These successes allowed a short-lived Byzantine counter-offensive in the West in the 870s and 880s under Nikephoros Phokas the Elder. A heavy defeat off Milazzo in 888, however, signalled the virtual disappearance of major Byzantine naval activity in the seas around Italy for the next century.

==== Arab raids during the reign of Leo VI ====
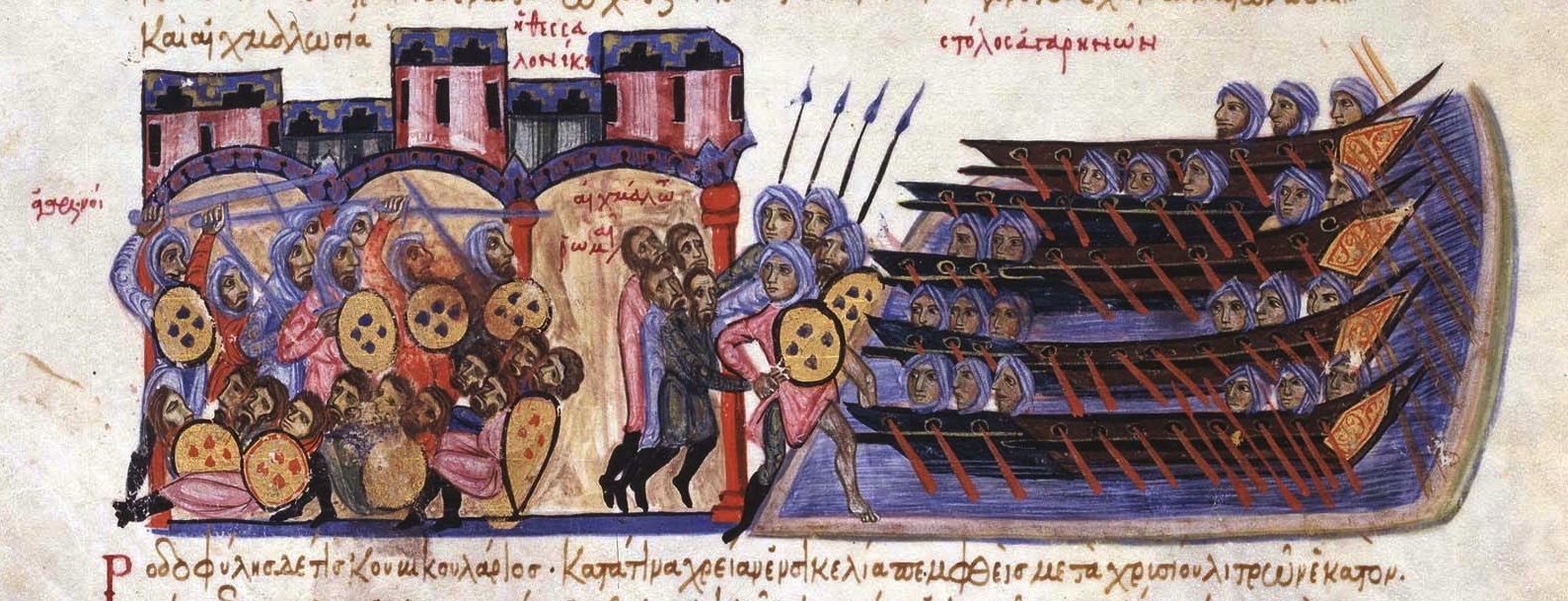
The sack of Thessalonica by the Arabs under Leo of Tripoli in 904, as depicted in the Madrid Skylitzes manuscript. It was the most serious of a renewed wave of piratical raids by the Muslim navies in the Aegean Sea during Leo VI's reign.

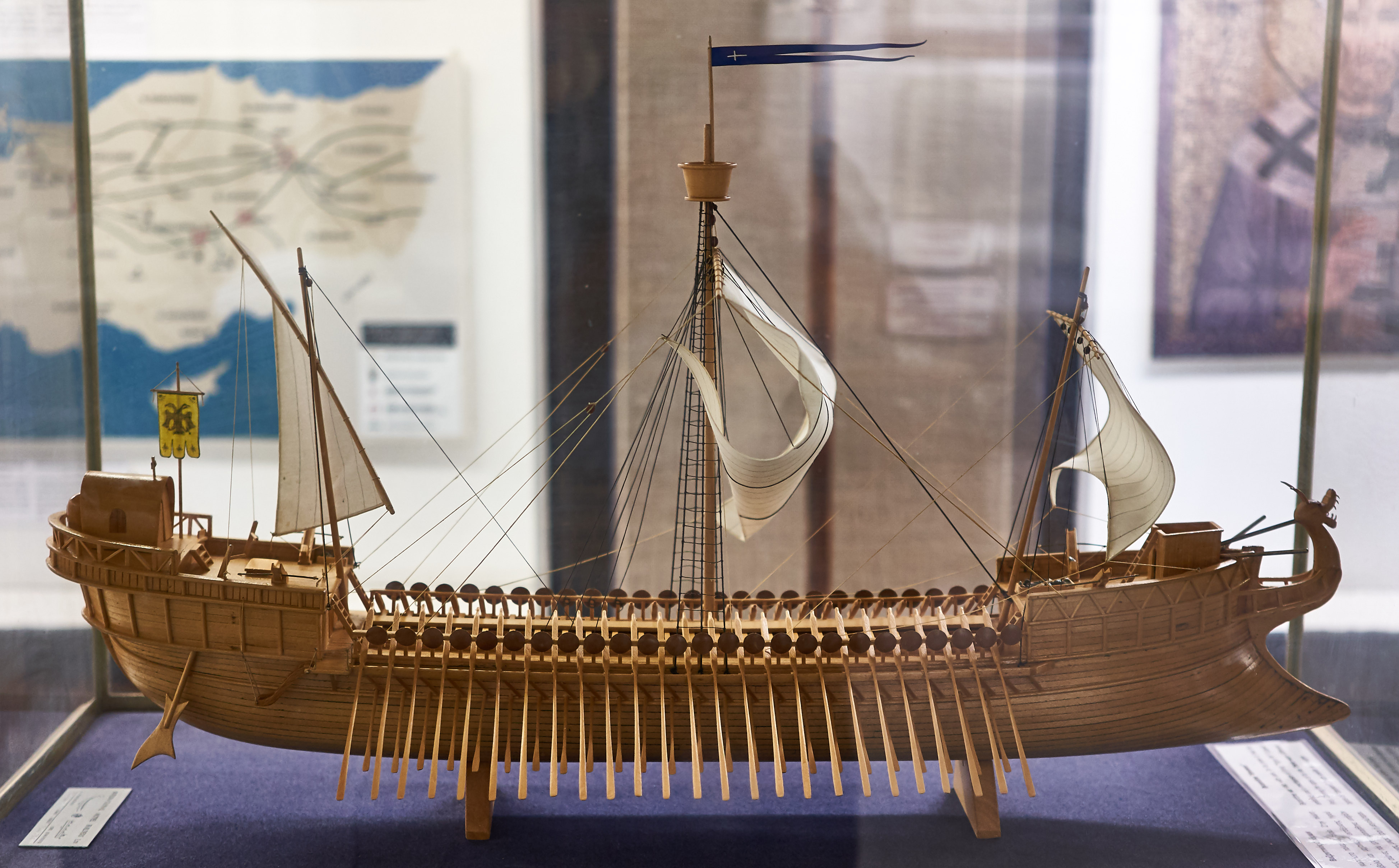
Model of a Byzantine warship (dromon) with oars, located Athens War Museum

During the reign of Basil's successor Leo VI the Wise (886–912), the Empire again faced serious threats. In the north, a war broke out against the Bulgarian Tsar Simeon. The Byzantines suffered several defeats there, while the Arabs continued to raid the Aegean shores. In 891 or 893, the Arab fleet sacked the island of Samos and took its strategos (military governor) prisoner, and in 898, 3,000 Byzantine sailors of the Cibyrrhaeots were imprisoned. These losses opened the Aegean up to raids by the Syrian fleets. A heavy blow came in 901, when the renegade Damian of Tarsus plundered Demetrias, while in the next year, Taormina, the Empire's last outpost in Sicily, fell to the Muslims. The greatest disaster, however, came in 904, when another renegade, Leo of Tripoli, raided the Aegean. His fleet penetrated the Dardanelles, before sacking the Empire's second city, Thessalonica, all while the Empire's fleet remained passive. The Cretan corsairs' raids reached such intensity that by the end of Leo's reign, most of the southern Aegean islands were either abandoned or forced to pay tribute to the pirates. It is no surprise that a defensive and cautious mindset was prevalent in Leo's contemporary instructions on naval warfare (Naumachica).

The most distinguished Byzantine admiral of the period was Himerios, the logothetes tou dromou. Appointed admiral in 904, he scored his first victory in 905 or 906, and in 910, he led a successful attack on Laodicea. A year later, he commanded a huge expedition of 112 dromons and 75 pamphyloi with 43,000 men against the Emirate of Crete, but not only failed to recover the island, but on his return voyage, was comprehensively defeated by Leo of Tripoli (October 912).

==== Recovery of Crete and the northern Levant ====
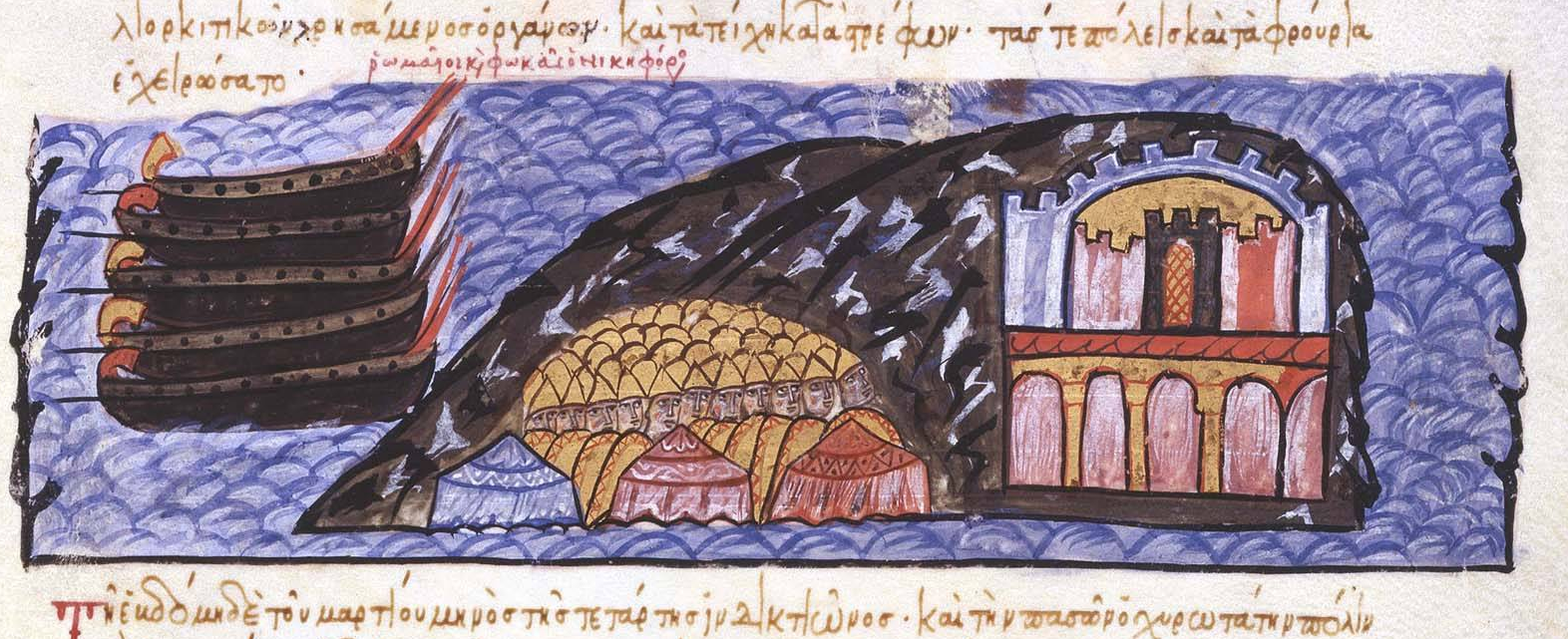
The siege of Chandax, the main Muslim stronghold in Crete, as depicted in the Madrid Skylitzes manuscript. Nikephoros Phokas led a huge amphibious operation which recovered Crete for the Empire, thus securing the Aegean Sea from the Muslim pirate threat.

In 920, an admiral, Romanos Lekapenos (920–944), ascended to the imperial throne. Leo of Tripoli was decisively defeated off Lemnos in 923, while Damian died the next year. In 942, a squadron to the Tyrrhenian Sea destroyed a fleet of Muslim corsairs from Fraxinetum using Greek fire, but seven years later another expedition against Crete ended in disaster. A renewed offensive in Italy in 951–952 was defeated by the Fatimids, but another expedition in 956 and the loss of an Ifriqiyan fleet in a storm in 958 temporarily stabilized that situation. In 962, the Fatimids launched an assault on the remaining Byzantine strongholds on Sicily; Taormina fell and Rometta was besieged. In response, a major Byzantine expedition was launched in 964 but ended in disaster. The Fatimids defeated the Byzantine army before Rometta and then annihilated the fleet at the Battle of the Straits, notably through the use of divers bearing incendiary devices. With both powers focusing their attention elsewhere, a truce was concluded in 967, which curbed Byzantine naval activity in the West.

In 956, the strategos Basil Hexamilites inflicted a crushing defeat on the Tarsiot fleet, opening the way for another grand expedition to recover Crete. It was entrusted to Nikephoros Phokas, who in 960 set out with a fleet of 100 dromons, 200 chelandia, and 308 transports, carrying an overall force of 77,000 men, to subdue the island. Although the navy ultimately had a limited combat role in the campaign, it was essential for keeping the sea-lanes open for supplies to be brought in. The successful conquest of Crete removed the direct threat to the Aegean, Byzantium's naval heartland, while Phokas' subsequent operations led to the recovery of Cilicia (in 963), Cyprus (in 968), and the northern Syrian coast (in 969). These conquests effectively re-established Byzantine dominance in the Eastern Mediterranean so that Nikephoros Phokas could boast "I alone command the sea". The Eastern Mediterranean remained relatively calm for several decades to come.

During the same period, the Byzantine fleet was active in the Black Sea as well: a Rus' fleet that was threatening Constantinople in 941 was destroyed by 15 old ships equipped with Greek fire, and during Rus'–Byzantine War of 970–971, John I Tzimiskes (969–976) sent 300 ships to blockade the Kievan Rus' from retreating over the Danube.

=== Komnenian period ===
==== Decline during the 11th century ====
"Strive at all time to have the fleet in top condition and to have it not want for anything. For the fleet is the glory of Rhōmania. [...] The droungarios and protonotarios of the fleet should [...] investigate with rigor the slightest thing which is done to the fleet. For when the fleet is reduced to nothingness, you shall be overthrown and fall."

— Admonitions to the Emperor, from the Strategikon of Kekaumenos, Ch. 87

Throughout most of the 11th century, the Byzantine navy faced few challenges. The Muslim threat had receded, as their navies declined and relations between the Fatimids, especially, and the Empire were largely peaceful. Another Rus' attack in 1043 was beaten back with ease, and no major naval expeditions were undertaken either. This long period of peace led to complacency and neglect of the military. In the reign of Basil II (976–1025), the defence of the Adriatic was entrusted to the Venetians. Under Constantine IX (1042–1055), both the army and navy were reduced as military service was increasingly commuted in favour of cash payments, resulting in an increased dependency upon foreign mercenaries. The large thematic fleets declined and were replaced by small squadrons subject to the local military commanders, geared more towards the suppression of piracy than naval warfare.

By the last quarter of the 11th century, the Byzantine navy was a shadow of its former self. Kekaumenos, writing in c. 1078, lamented that Byzantine ships traded goods when supposed to be patrolling, and fled the enemy rather than fight them. By the time Kekaumenos wrote, new and powerful adversaries had risen. In the West, the Kingdom of Sicily, which had expelled the Byzantines from Southern Italy, was now casting its eye on the Byzantine Adriatic coasts. In the East, the disastrous Battle of Manzikert in 1071 had resulted in the loss of Asia Minor, the Empire's military and economic heartland, to the Seljuk Turks. Turkish as well as Christian pirates re-appeared in the Aegean. The Byzantine thematic fleets were incapable of responding effectively.

==== Attempts at recovery under Alexios I and John II ====
The sorry state of the Byzantine fleet had dire consequences. The Norman invasion could not be forestalled, and their army seized Corfu, landed unopposed in Epirus and laid siege to Dyrrhachium. The new emperor, Alexios I Komnenos (1081–1118), was forced to call upon the assistance of the Venetians. In 1082, in exchange for their help, he granted them major trading concessions. This treaty, and subsequent extensions of these privileges, practically rendered the Byzantines hostage to the Venetians (and later also the Genoese and the Pisans). Historian John Birkenmeier notes that:

Byzantium's lack of a navy [...] meant that Venice could regularly extort economic privileges, determine whether invaders, such as the Normans or Crusaders entered the Empire, and parry any Byzantine attempts to restrict Venetian commercial or naval activity.

In the clashes with the Normans through the 1080s, the only effective Byzantine naval force was a squadron commanded by the veteran Michael Maurex. Together with the Venetians, he initially prevailed over the Norman fleet, but the joint fleet was caught off guard and defeated by the Normans in 1084.

Alexios inevitably realized the importance of having his own fleet, and took steps to re-establish the navy's strength. His efforts bore some success, especially in countering the attempts by Turkish emirs like Tzachas of Smyrna to launch fleets in the Aegean. The fleet under John Doukas was subsequently used to suppress revolts in Crete and Cyprus. With the aid of the Crusaders, Alexios was able to regain the coasts of Western Anatolia and expand his influence eastwards: in 1104, a Byzantine squadron of 10 ships captured Laodicea and other coastal towns as far as Tripoli. Like his father, John II Komnenos (1118–1143) took care to maintain the navy's strength and provisioning system. In 1122, however, when John refused to renew the privileges that Alexios had granted to the Venetians, they retaliated by plundering several islands. John was forced to renew the treaty in 1125: evidently, the Byzantine navy was not sufficiently powerful to confront Venice. Not long after this, John II is reported to have cut funding to the fleet and transferred it to the army, equipping ships on an ad hoc basis only.

==== Naval expeditions of Manuel I ====
The navy enjoyed a major comeback under the ambitious emperor Manuel I Komnenos (1143–1180), who used it extensively as a powerful tool of foreign policy in the Eastern Mediterranean. During the early years of his reign, the Byzantine naval forces were still weak: in 1147, the fleet of Roger II of Sicily was able to raid Corfu, the Ionian islands and into the Aegean almost unopposed. In the next year, with Venetian aid, an army accompanied by a very large fleet (allegedly 500 warships and 1,000 transports) was sent to recapture Corfu and the Ionian Islands from the Normans. In retaliation, a Norman fleet of 40 ships reached Constantinople itself and raided its suburbs. On its return voyage however it was attacked and destroyed by a Byzantine or Venetian fleet.

In 1155, a Byzantine squadron of ten ships in support of Norman rebel Robert III of Loritello arrived at Ancona, launching the last Byzantine bid to regain Southern Italy. Despite initial successes, the expedition was ultimately defeated. By 1169, the efforts of Manuel had evidently borne fruit, as a large and purely Byzantine fleet of about 150 galleys, 10-12 large transports and 60 horse transports under megas doux Andronikos Kontostephanos was sent to invade Egypt in cooperation with the ruler of the Crusader Kingdom of Jerusalem. The invasion failed, however, and the Byzantines lost half the fleet in a storm on the way back.

Following the Empire-wide imprisonment of all Venetians in March 1171, the Byzantine fleet was strong enough to deter an outright attack by the Venetians. Manuel sent a fleet of 150 ships under Kontostephanos to delay negotiations at Chios until the disease-weakened Venetians withdrew, pursued by Kontostephanos. It was a remarkable reversal of fortunes compared with 1125. In 1177, another fleet of 70 galleys and 80 auxiliary ships under Kontostephanos turned back from invading Egypt after many nobles of the Kingdom of Jerusalem refused to participate. However, by the end of Manuel's reign, the strains of constant warfare and the Emperor's various grandiose projects had become evident: the historian Niketas Choniates attributes the rise of piracy in the latter years of Manuel's reign to the diversion of the funds intended for the maintenance of the fleet for other needs of the imperial treasury.

=== Decline ===
==== Angelos dynasty and the Fourth Crusade ====
After the death of Manuel I, the navy declined swiftly. Neglect of the maintenance of galleys and the upkeep of proficient crews led to a rapid deterioration. Already by 1182 the Byzantines had to pay Venetian mercenaries to crew some of their galleys. While Andronikos I Komnenos (1183–1185) could still gather 100 warships in 1185 to defeat a Norman fleet in the Sea of Marmara, the subsequent peace treaty required the Normans to furnish a fleet for the Empire. Alongside a similar agreement made by Isaac II Angelos (1185–1195 and 1203–1204) with Venice the next year, this indicates that the Byzantine government was aware of the inadequacy of its fleets.

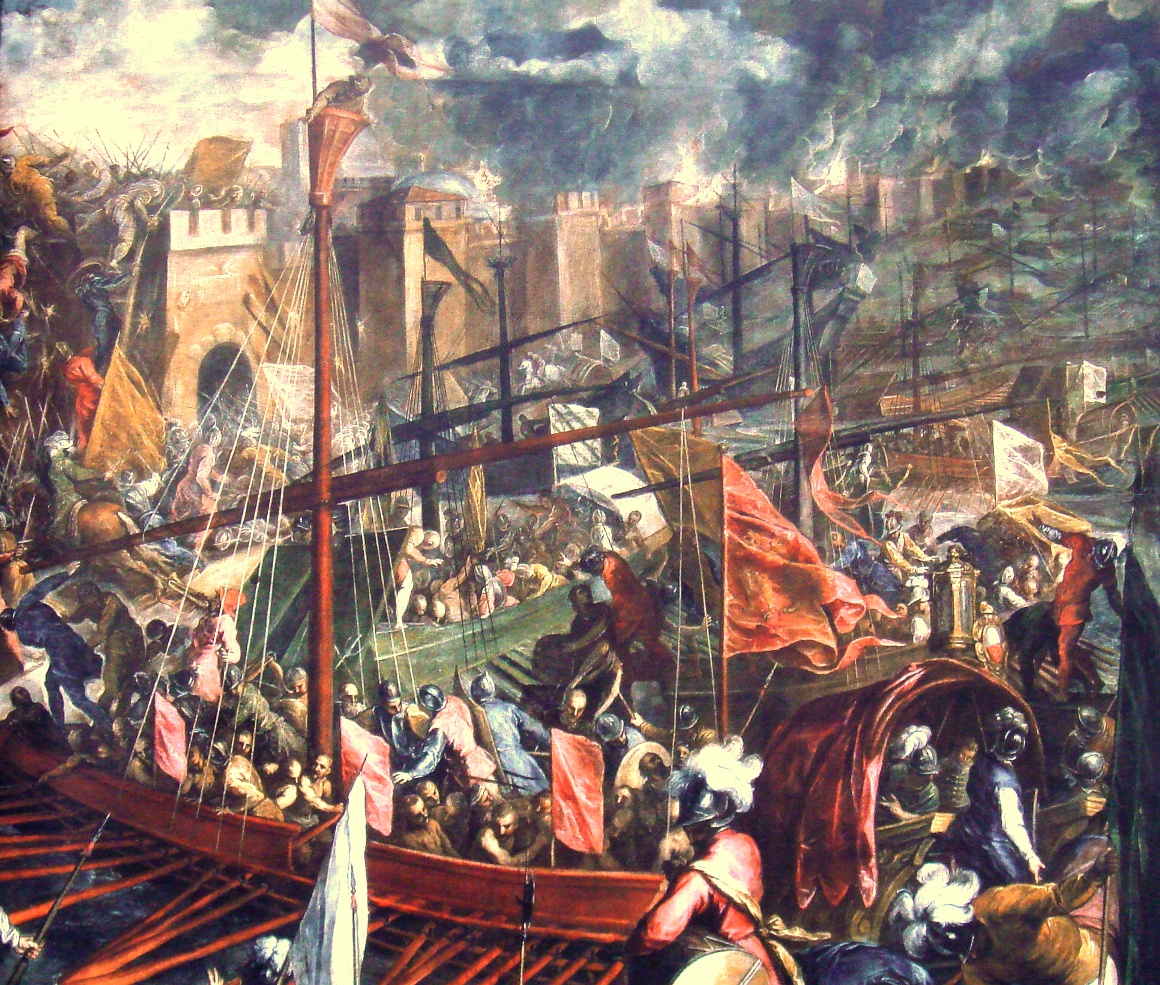
The fall of Constantinople to the Fourth Crusade marked the triumph of the Latin West, and especially the Venetian maritime power, over the enfeebled Byzantine Empire.

The period also saw the rise of piracy across the Eastern Mediterranean. In the Aegean, pirate captains frequently offered themselves as mercenaries to regional powers, providing a quick method of raising a fleet without the costs of a standing navy. Thus a Byzantine fleet of 66 vessels sent by Isaac II to recapture Cyprus was destroyed by the pirate Margaritus of Brindisi, who was in the employ of the Normans of Sicily. The depredations of the pirates, especially the Genoese captain Kaphoures, finally forced the Angeloi to action. The fleet tax was once again levied from the coastal regions. Entrusted to the Calabrian pirate Steiriones, a fleet of 30 ships was destroyed in a surprise attack by Kaphoures off Sestos, before a second fleet, augmented by Pisan vessels and again commanded by Steiriones, was finally able to defeat Kaphoures and end his raids. At the same time, however, the then megas doux, Michael Stryphnos, was accused by Niketas Choniates of enriching himself by selling off the equipment of the imperial fleet. The lawless atmosphere enabled commanders like Leo Sgouros in southern Greece and the imperial governor of Samos, Pegonites, to use their ships for their own purposes, launching raids of their own. Even Emperor Alexios III Angelos (1195–1203) is said to have licensed one of his commanders, Constantine Phrangopoulos, to launch pirate raids against commerce in the Black Sea.

The Byzantine state and its fleet were thus in no state to resist the naval might of Venice, which supported the Fourth Crusade. According to Niketas Choniates, only 20 "wretched and decayed" vessels could be found to oppose the Crusaders sailing for Constantinople. During the first Crusader siege of the city in 1203, the Byzantine ships failed to prevent the Crusaders from entering the Golden Horn, or to employ fireships, due to the Venetians' skill.

==== Nicaea and the Palaiologan period ====
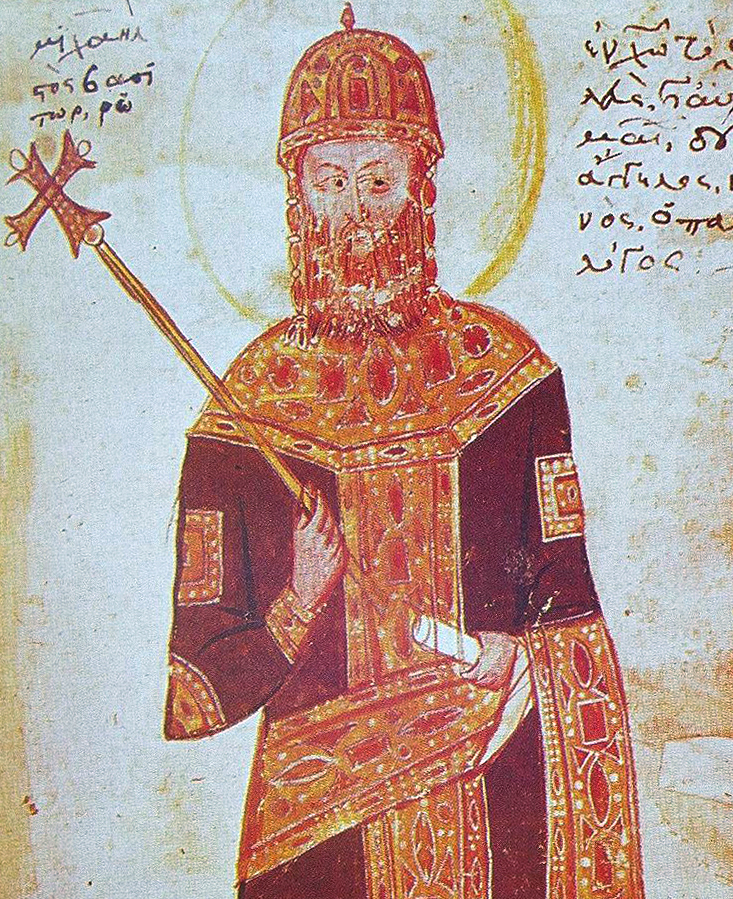
Emperor Michael VIII Palaiologos. He restored the Byzantine Empire by recapturing Constantinople, and was responsible for the last flourishing of Byzantium as a major naval power.

After the capture of Constantinople by the Fourth Crusade, the Byzantine Empire was partitioned between the Crusaders, while three Greek successor states were set up, the Despotate of Epirus, the Empire of Trebizond, and the Empire of Nicaea, each claiming the Byzantine imperial title. The former did not maintain a fleet, the Trapezuntine navy was minuscule and mostly used for patrols and transporting troops, while the Nicaeans initially followed a policy of consolidation and used their fleet for coastal defence. Under John III Vatatzes (1222–1254), a more energetic foreign policy was pursued, and in 1225, the Nicaean fleet was able to occupy some Aegean islands. It was, however, no match for the Venetians: two attempts to blockade Constantinople, in 1235 and in 1241, were routed by smaller Venetian fleets. Aware of the weakness of his navy, in March 1261 the Emperor Michael VIII Palaiologos (1259–1282) secured Genoese aid against Venice at sea, in return for commercial privileges.

Following the recapture of Constantinople a few months later however, Michael VIII was able to focus his attention on building up his own fleet. Taking advantage of the Italians' preoccupation with the ongoing Venetian–Genoese war, by 1270 Michael's efforts had produced a strong navy of 80 ships, with several Latin privateers sailing under imperial colours. In the same year, a fleet of 24 galleys besieged Oreos in Negroponte (Euboea), and defeated a Latin fleet. This was the first successful independent Byzantine naval operation and the beginning of an organized naval campaign in the Aegean that resulted in the brief recapture of many islands.

This revival did not last long. Following the death of Charles of Anjou in 1285 and the end of the threat of an invasion from Italy, Michael's successor Andronikos II Palaiologos (1282–1328) decided that, by relying on the naval strength of the Genoese, he could alleviate the demands on the increasingly cash-strapped treasury by ceasing to maintain a standing fleet. Andronikos was more concerned with his—eventually futile—attempt to stop the Turkish advance in Asia Minor, where the fleet lacked a role. Consequently, the entire fleet was disbanded, its crews dismissed and its ships broken up or left to rot. The results were quick to follow: during Andronikos' long reign, the Turks gradually took control of the Aegean coasts of Anatolia, while the Venetian fleet was able to raid Constantinople and its suburbs at will during the 1296–1302 war.

Andronikos' decision was heavily criticised by contemporaries; historians like Pachymeres and Nikephoros Gregoras describe in detail the disastrous effects of this short-sighted decision: piracy flourished, often augmented by the crews of the disbanded fleet, Constantinople was rendered defenceless towards the Italian maritime powers, and more and more Aegean islands fell under foreign rule—including Chios to the Genoese Benedetto Zaccaria, Rhodes and the Dodecanese to the Hospitallers, Lesbos and other islands to the Gattilusi. After 1305, bowing to popular pressure and the need to contain the Catalan Company, the Emperor belatedly tried to rebuild the navy of 20 vessels, but although a few ships were built, they eventually were disbanded again.

In the 14th century, recurrent civil wars and attacks from the Balkans and Asia Minor hastened the collapse of the Byzantine state. Several emperors after Andronikos II also tried to re-build a fleet, but their efforts produced only short-term results. Andronikos III Palaiologos (1328–1341) assembled a large fleet of reportedly 105 vessels. This he personally led in the last major foray of a Byzantine navy in the Aegean, recovering Chios and Phocaea from the Genoese and forcing various smaller principalities to come to terms. His campaigns against the Ottoman Turks were failures, however, and soon the Ottomans had begun to raid the coasts of Thrace. To defend against this new threat, towards the end of Andronikos III's reign a fleet of some 70 ships was built at Constantinople, headed by the megas doux, Alexios Apokaukos. This fleet was very active during the civil war of 1341–1347, in which its commander played a prominent role.

Following the civil war, Emperor John VI Kantakouzenos (1347–1354) tried to reduce the Empire's economic dependency on the Genoese colony of Galata, which controlled the trade passing through Constantinople, and to secure the control of the Dardanelles against the Turks. He enlisted the aid of the Venetians, but in March 1349, his newly built fleet of nine warships were either sunk or captured by the Genoese. Undeterred, Kantakouzenos' next effort allowed him to re-establish Byzantine authority over Thessalonica and some coastal cities and islands. Although Byzantine ships remained active in the Aegean, and scored some successes over Turkish pirates, they were never able to stop their activities, let alone challenge the Italian navies for supremacy at sea.

Henceforth, the impoverished Byzantine state became a pawn of the great powers of the day, trying to survive by exploiting their rivalries. Thus in 1351, Kantakouzenos was induced to side with Venice in its war with Genoa, but the subsequent battle ended in a carnage, and the Venetian admirals preferred to not risk another battle, condemning Kantakouzenos to sign an unfavourable peace. Byzantine ships were active throughout the Ottoman Interregnum, when Byzantium sided with various rival Ottoman princes in turn. Manuel II (1391–1425) used his ships to ferry the rival pretenders and their forces across the Straits. With Genoese assistance, Manuel's fleet was also able to muster a fleet of eight galleys and briefly capture Gallipoli in May 1410; in August 1411, the Byzantine fleet was instrumental in defeating the Ottoman prince Musa Çelebi's attempt to conquer Constantinople by preventing a blockade. Likewise, in 1421, ten Byzantine warships were engaged in support of the Ottoman pretender Mustafa against Sultan Murad II.

The last recorded Byzantine naval victory occurred in 1427 in a battle off the Echinades Islands, when the Emperor John VIII Palaiologos (1425–1448) forced Carlo I Tocco to relinquish all his holdings in the Morea to the Byzantines. The last appearance of the Byzantine navy was in the final Ottoman siege of 1453, when a mixed fleet of Byzantine, Genoese and Venetian ships defended Constantinople. On 20 April 1453, the last Byzantine naval engagement took place when three Genoese galleys and a Byzantine transport fought their way through the huge Ottoman blockade fleet and into the Golden Horn.

== Organization ==
=== Early period (4th – mid-7th centuries) ===
Very little is known about the organization of the Roman fleets of late Antiquity. Earlier scholars believed that the Roman navy had all but vanished by the 4th century, but more recent work has altered this picture towards a transformation into a mainly fluvial and coastal force, designed for close co-operation with the army.

Under Emperor Diocletian (284–305), the navy's strength reportedly increased from 46,000 men to 64,000 men, a figure that represents the numerical peak of the late Roman navy. In the West, several fluvial fleets are mentioned, but the old standing praetorian fleets had all but vanished and the remaining provincial fleets appear to have been incapable of countering any significant barbarian attack. In the East, the Syrian and Alexandrian fleets are known to have still existed in c. 400, while a fleet is known to have been stationed at Constantinople itself, perhaps created out of the remnants of the praetorian fleets. Its size, however, is unknown, and it does not appear in the Notitia.

Fleets appear to have been assembled on an ad hoc basis for operations in the Mediterranean during the 5th century. The first permanent Byzantine fleet can be traced to the revolt of Vitalian in 513–515, when Anastasius I created a fleet to counter the rebels' own. This fleet was retained and under Justinian I and his successors it was developed into a professional and well-maintained force. Because of the absence of any naval threat, however, the navy of the late 6th century was relatively small, with several small flotillas in the Danube and two main fleets maintained at Ravenna and Constantinople. Additional flotillas must have been stationed at the other great maritime and commercial centres of the Empire, especially Alexandria and Carthage. Justinian also stationed troops and ships at remote outposts. The long-established naval tradition and infrastructure of those areas made fleet maintenance easier, and, in the event of a naval expedition, a large fleet could be assembled quicker and cheaper by impressing merchant vessels.

=== Middle period (late 7th century – 1070s) ===
==== Fleet organization ====
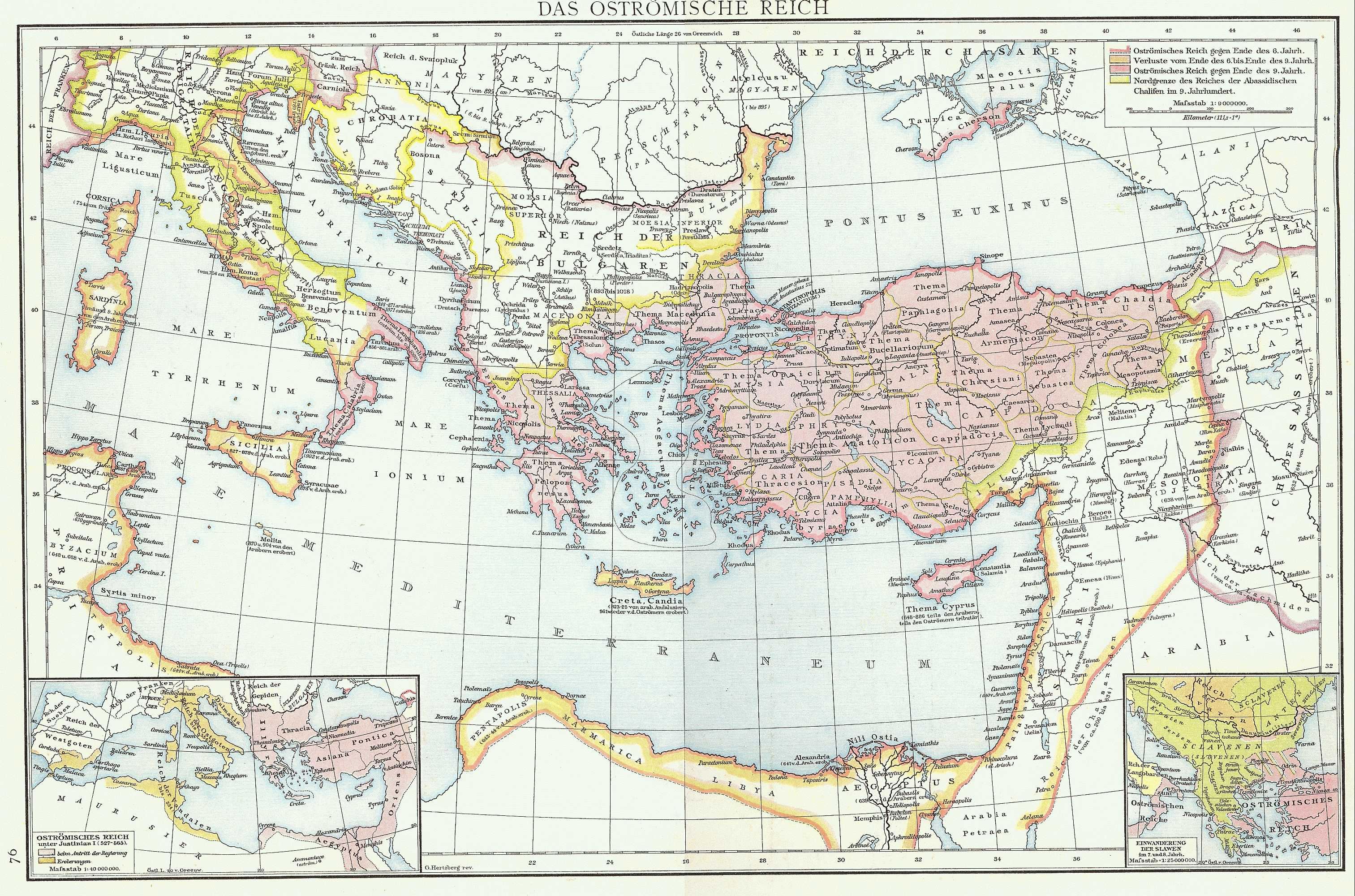
The Byzantine Empire between the 6th and late 9th centuries, including the themes as of c. 900. The scattered and isolated imperial possessions around the Mediterranean were defended and reinforced by the Byzantine fleets.

In response to the Arab conquests during the 7th century, the whole administrative and military system of the Empire was reformed, and the thematic system established. According to this, the Empire was divided into several themes (Ancient Greek: θέματα, romanized: themata, sing. θέμα, thema), which were regional civil and military administrations. Under the command of a strategos, each theme maintained its own, locally levied forces. A central imperial army, the tagmata, was created, stationed at or near Constantinople, serving as a central reserve that formed the core of campaigning armies.

===== Rise and fall of the Karabisianoi =====
A similar process was followed in the fleet. In the second half of the 7th century, the fleet of the Karabisianoi (Ancient Greek: Καραβισιάνοι, lit. 'the Ships' Men') was created. The exact date is unknown, with suggestions ranging from the 650s/660s, in response to the Battle of the Masts, or following the first Arab siege of Constantinople in 672–678. Its origin is also unknown: it was recruited possibly from the remainders of the old quaestura exercitus, or the army of the Illyricum. It was headed by a strategos (strategos ton karabon/karabisianon, lit. 'general of the ships/seafarers'), and included the southern coast of Asia Minor from Miletus to the frontier with the Caliphate near Seleucia in Cilicia, the Aegean islands and the imperial holdings in southern Greece. Its headquarters was initially perhaps at Samos, with a subordinate command under a droungarios at Cibyrrha in Pamphylia. As its name suggests, it comprised most of the Empire's standing navy, and faced the principal maritime threat, the Arab fleets.

The Karabisianoi however proved inadequate and were replaced in the early 8th century by a more complex system composed of three elements, which with minor alterations survived until the 11th century: a central imperial fleet based at Constantinople, a small number of large regional naval commands, either naval themes or independent commands termed "droungariates", and a greater number of local squadrons charged with purely defensive and police tasks and subordinate to the local provincial governors. The Byzantine regional fleets were probably formidable formations in their own right.

===== The Imperial Fleet =====
The capital's navy had played a central role in the repulsion of the Arab sieges of Constantinople, but the exact date of the establishment of the Imperial Fleet (βασιλικὸς στόλος, basilikos stolos, or βασιλικὸν πλόϊμον, basilikon ploïmon) is unclear. The historian J. B. Bury, followed by the Byzantinist Rodolphe Guilland, considered it "not improbable" that the Imperial Fleet existed as a subordinate command under the strategos ton karabisianon already in the 7th century. On the other hand, the droungarios of the Imperial Fleet first appears in the Taktikon Uspensky of c. 842/3; and as there is little evidence for major fleets operating from Constantinople during the 8th century, the Byzantinist Hélène Ahrweiler dated the fleet's creation to the early 9th century. From that point on, the Imperial Fleet formed the main naval reserve force and provided the core of various expeditionary fleets.

===== Maritime themes =====
The first maritime theme (θέμα ναυτικόν, thema nautikon) was the Theme of the Cibyrrhaeots (θέμα Κιβυρραιωτῶν, thema Kibyrrhaioton). It was created from the Karabisianoi fleet, and assigned to the administration and defence of the southern coasts of Asia Minor. The exact date of its creation is unclear, with one view proposing c. 719 and another c. 727. Its strategos was based at Attaleia. His principal lieutenants were the katepano (head commander) of the Mardaites, an ek prosopou (deputy commander) at Syllaeum and droungarioi of Attaleia and Kos. Being located closest to the Muslim Levant, it remained the Empire's principal naval fleet until it was reduced with the decline of the Arab naval threat. The fleet is last mentioned in 1043.

The Cibyrrhaeots were complemented by two independent naval commands in the Aegean, each headed by a droungarios: the Aigaion Pelagos ('Aegean Sea'), covering the northern half of the Aegean and the Dardanelles and Marmara Sea, and the command variously known as the Dodekanesos ('Twelve Islands') and Kolpos ('Gulf'), which was based at Samos and comprised the southern Aegean including the Cyclades. Unlike the other droungarioi, who headed subordinate commands, these two were completely independent, and their droungarioi exercised both civil and military authority over them. Eventually, they were raised to full maritime themes, the Theme of the Aegean Sea (θέμα τοῦ Αἰγαίου Πελάγους, thema tou Aigaiou Pelagous) in c. 843, while the eastern parts of the Dodekanesos/Kolpos droungariate formed the Theme of Samos (θέμα Σάμου, thema Samou) in the late 9th century. It comprised the Ionian coast, and its capital was at Smyrna.

===== Local squadrons =====
Some of the other, 'land' themes also maintained sizeable squadrons, usually placed under a tourmarches. They played an intermediate role: they were permanent squadrons with professional crews (taxatoi), maintained by resources from the imperial treasury and not the province they were stationed in, but subordinate to the local thematic strategos and charged mainly with local defence and police duties. These were:

- The Theme of Hellas (θέμα Ἑλλάδος, thema Hellados), founded in c. 686–689 by Justinian II, it encompassed the imperial possessions of southern Greece with capital at Corinth. Justinian settled 6,500 Mardaites there, who provided oarsmen and garrisons. While not exclusively a naval theme, it maintained its own fleet. It was split in 809 into the Theme of the Peloponnese and the new Theme of Hellas, covering Central Greece and Thessaly, which also retained smaller fleets.
- The Theme of Sicily (θέμα Σικελίας, thema Sikelias) was responsible for Sicily and the imperial possessions in south-western Italy (Calabria). Once the bastion of Byzantine naval strength in the West, by the late 9th century it had greatly diminished in strength and disappeared after the final loss of Taormina in 902.
- The Theme of Cephallenia (θέμα Κεφαλληνίας, thema Kephallenias), controlling the Ionian Islands, was established in the mid- to late 8th century, to protect imperial communications with Italy and defend the Ionian Sea from Arab raids. The new imperial possessions in Apulia were added to it in the 870s, before they were made into a separate theme (that of Longobardia) in about 910.
- The Theme of Paphlagonia (θέμα Παφλαγονίας, thema Paphlagonias) and the Theme of Chaldia (θέμα Χαλδίας, thema Chaldias) were split off from the Armeniac Theme in c. 819 by Emperor Leo V and provided with their own naval squadrons, possibly as a defence against Rus' raids.

Isolated regions of particular importance for the control of the major sea-lanes were covered by separate officials with the title of archon, who in some cases may have commanded detachments of the Imperial Fleet. Such archontes are known for Chios, Malta, the Euboic Gulf, and possibly Vagenetia and "Bulgaria" (the mouths of the Danube). These vanished by the end of the 9th century, either succumbing to Arab attacks or being reformed or incorporated into themes.

==== Manpower and size ====
Just as with its land counterpart, the exact size of the Byzantine navy and its units is a matter of considerable debate, owing to the scantness and ambiguous nature of the primary sources. An exception is the numbers for the late 9th and early 10th century, for which we possess a more detailed breakdown, dated to the Cretan expedition of 911: here, the navy reached 34,200 oarsmen and perhaps as many as 8,000 marines. The central Imperial Fleet totalled some 19,600 oarsmen and 4,000 marines under the command of the droungarios of the Imperial Fleet. These four thousand marines were professional soldiers, first recruited as a corps by Basil I in the 870s. This new force was a great asset to the Imperial Fleet, as the marines were more reliable than the thematic and tagmatic soldiers it had previously depended on. Their importance is illustrated by their being considered part of the imperial tagmata. The Aegean thematic fleet numbered 2,610 oarsmen and 400 marines, the Cibyrrhaeot fleet stood at 5,710 oarsmen and 1,000 marines, the Samian fleet at 3,980 oarsmen and 600 marines, and finally, the Theme of Hellas furnished 2,300 oarsmen with a portion of its 2,000 thematic soldiers doubling as marines.

The following table contains estimates, by Warren T. Treadgold, of the number of oarsmen over the entire history of the Byzantine navy:

Year	300	457	518	540	775	842	959	1025	1321
Rowers	32,000	32,000	30,000	30,000	18,500	14,600	34,200	34,200	3,080

Contrary to popular perception, galley slaves were not used as oarsmen. Throughout the existence of the Empire, Byzantine crews consisted of mostly lower-class freeborn men, who were legally obliged to perform military service (strateia) in return for pay or land estates. In the first half of the 10th century, the latter were calculated to be of the value of 2–3 pounds (0.91–1.36 kg) of gold for sailors and marines. Use was however made of prisoners of war and foreigners as well. Alongside the Mardaites, who formed a significant part of the fleet's crews, an enigmatic group known as the Toulmatzoi (possibly Dalmatians) appears in the Cretan expeditions, as well as many Rus', who were given the right to serve in the Byzantine armed forces in a series of 10th-century treaties.

For the total size of the Byzantine navy in the 10th century, Warren Treadgold extrapolates a total, including the naval themes, of c. 240 warships, a number which was increased to 307 for the Cretan expedition of 960–961. According to Treadgold, the latter number probably represents the approximate standing strength of the entire navy (including the smaller flotillas) in the 9th and 10th centuries. A significant drop in the numbers of ships and men attached to the thematic fleets is however evident between 911 and 949. This drop was partly due to the increased use of the lighter ousiakos ship type instead of the heavier dromon proper, and partly due to financial and manpower difficulties. It is also indicative of a general trend that would lead to the complete disappearance of the provincial fleets by the late 11th century.

==== Rank structure ====
Although naval themes were organized much the same way as their land counterparts, there is some confusion in the Byzantine sources as to the exact rank structure. The usual term for admiral was strategos, the same term used for the generals that governed the land themes. Under the strategos were two or three tourmarchai (sing. tourmarches, effectively 'vice admiral'), in turn overseeing a number of droungarioi (sing. droungarios, corresponding to 'rear admiral'). Until the mid-9th century, the governors of the themes of the Aegean and Samos are also recorded as droungarioi, since their commands were split off from the original Karabisianoi fleet, but they were then raised to the rank of strategos. As the thematic admirals also doubled as governors of their themes, they were assisted by a protonotarios (chief secretary) who headed the civilian administration of the theme. Further staff officers were the chartoularios in charge of the fleet administration, the protomandator (chief messenger), who acted as chief of staff, and a number of staff kometes ('counts', sing. komes), including a komes tes hetaireias, who commanded the bodyguard (hetaireia) of the admiral.

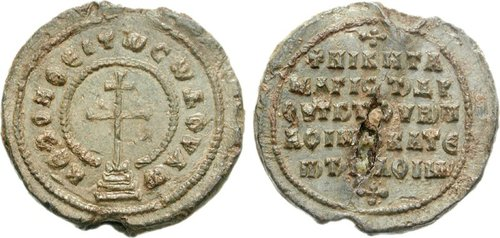
Seal of Niketas, magistros, droungarios and katepano of the basilikon ploïmon (late 9th century)

The Imperial Fleet was a different case, as it was considered as one of the tagmata, the professional central reserve forces. Consequently, the commander of the Imperial Fleet remained known as the droungarios tou basilikou ploïmou (later with the prefix megas, 'grand'). The originally low-ranking office rose quickly: by 899 he was placed ahead of various senior military and civil officials. He was also notable in being classed not with the other military commanders, but in the special class of military officials, the stratarchai, where he is listed second after the hetaireiarches, the commander of the imperial bodyguard. His title is still found in the Komnenian era, albeit as commander of the imperial escort squadron, and survived until the Palaiologan era. The office of a deputy called topoteretes is also mentioned for the Imperial Fleet, but his role is unclear from the sources. He may have held a post similar to that of a port admiral. Although some of these senior officers were professional seamen who had risen from the ranks, most fleet commanders were high court officials, who would have heavily relied on their more experienced subordinates.

In the lower levels of organization, there was more uniformity: squadrons of three or five ships were commanded by a komes or droungarokomes, and each ship's captain was called kentarchos ('centurion'), although literary sources also used more archaic terms like nauarchos or even trierarchos. Each ship's crew, depending on its size, was composed of one to three ousiai. Under the captain, there was the bandophoros ('banner bearer'), who acted as executive officer, two protokaraboi (sing. protokarabos, 'first ship-man'), sometimes also referred to archaically as kybernetes, and a bow officer, the proreus. The protokaraboi were helmsmen, in charge of the steering oars in the stern, as well as of the rowers on either side of the ship. The senior of the two was the "first protokarabos (protos protokarabos). There probably were several of each kind of officer upon each ship, working in shifts. Most of these officers rose from the ranks, and there are references in the De Administrando Imperio to first oarsmen (protelatai) who rose to become protokaraboi in the imperial barges, and later assumed still higher offices; Emperor Romanos Lekapenos being the most successful example. There were also a number of specialists on board, such as the two bow oarsmen and the siphonatores, who worked the siphons used for discharging the Greek fire. A boukinator (trumpeter) is also recorded in the sources, who conveyed orders to the rowers (koplatai or elatai).

=== Late period (1080s–1453) ===
==== Reforms of the Komnenoi ====
After the decline of the navy in the 11th century, Alexios I rebuilt it on different lines. Since the thematic fleets had all but vanished, their remnants were amalgamated into a unified imperial fleet, under the new office of the megas doux. The megas droungarios tou ploïmou, once the overall naval commander, was subordinated to him, acting now as his principal aide. The megas doux was also appointed as overall governor of southern Greece, the old themes of Hellas and the Peloponnese, which were divided into districts (oria) that supplied the fleet. Under John II, the Aegean islands also became responsible for the maintenance, crewing and provision of warships, and contemporary sources took pride in the fact that the great fleets of Manuel's reign were crewed by "native Romans", although use continued to be made of mercenaries and allied squadrons. However, as the fleet was now exclusively built and based around Constantinople, and provincial fleets were not reconstituted, outlying areas, in particular Greece, were left vulnerable to attack.

==== Nicaean navy ====
With the decline of the Byzantine fleet in the latter 12th century, the Empire increasingly relied on the fleets of Venice and Genoa. Following the sack of 1204 however, under John III and Theodore II (r. 1254–1258), the navy had two main strategic areas of operations: the Aegean, entailing operations against the Greek islands (chiefly Rhodes) as well as the transport and supply of armies fighting in the Balkans, and the Sea of Marmara, where the Nicaeans aimed to interdict Latin shipping and threaten Constantinople. Smyrna provided the main shipyard and base for the Aegean, with a secondary one at Stadeia, while the main base for operations in the Marmara Sea was Holkos, near Lampsakos across the Gallipoli peninsula.

==== Palaiologan navy ====
After regaining Constantinople in 1261, Michael VIII attempted to lessen the dependence on the Genoese by building a "national" navy, forming a number of new corps to this purpose: the Gasmouloi (Γασμοῦλοι), who were men of mixed Greek-Latin descent living around the capital; and men from Laconia, called Lakones) or Tzakones (Τζάκωνες), were used as marines, forming the bulk of Byzantine naval manpower in the 1260s and 1270s. Michael also set the rowers, called Prosalentai (Προσαλενταί) or Proselontes (Προσελῶντες), apart as a separate corps. All these groups received small grants of land to cultivate in exchange for their service, and were settled together in small colonies. The Prosalentai were settled near the sea throughout the northern Aegean, while the Gasmouloi and Tzakones were settled mostly around Constantinople and in Thrace. These corps remained extant, albeit in a diminished form, throughout the last centuries of the Empire; indeed the Gasmouloi of Gallipoli formed the bulk of the crews of the first fleets of the Ottomans after their conquest. Throughout the Palaiologan period, the fleet's main base was the harbour of Kontoskalion on the Marmara shore of Constantinople. The most important provincial naval centre was probably Monemvasia in the Peloponnese.

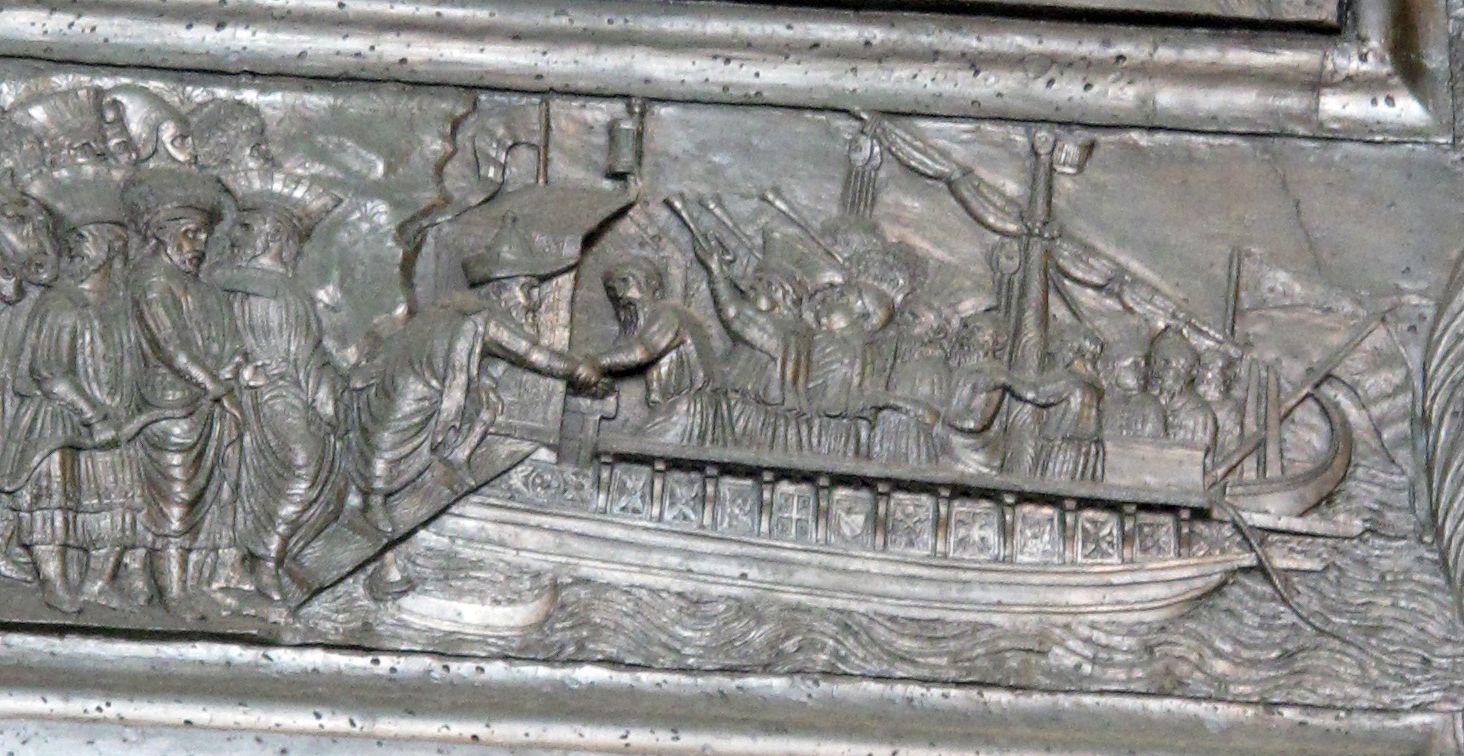
John VIII boarding his galley. Bronze door by Filarete in the St. Peter's Basilica, about 1448

At the same time, Michael and his successors continued to utilise foreigners. Alongside the Italian city-states, with whom alliances shifted regularly, mercenaries were increasingly employed, often rewarded for their services with fiefs. Most of these mercenaries, like Giovanni de lo Cavo (lord of Anafi and Rhodes), Andrea Morisco (successor of de lo Cavo in Rhodes) and Benedetto Zaccaria (lord of Chios and Phocaea), were Genoese, the Byzantines' major ally in the period. Under Michael VIII, for the first time a foreigner, the Italian privateer Licario, became megas doux and was given Euboea as a fief. In 1303, another high rank, that of amerales (ἀμηράλης or ἀμηραλῆς) was introduced. The term was adopted as part of the imperial hierarchy, coming after the megas doux and the megas droungarios, with the arrival of the mercenaries of the Catalan Company. Only two holders are known, Ferran d'Aunés and Andrea Morisco, both from 1303 to 1305, although the rank continued to be mentioned in various lists of offices long after that. Thus, according to the mid-14th century Book of Offices, the subordinates of the megas doux were the megas droungarios tou stolou, the ameralios, the protokomes, the junior droungarioi, and the junior kometes. Pseudo-Kodinos records that, while the other warships flew "the usual imperial flag" (βασιλικὸν φλάμουλον, basilikon phlamoulon) of the cross and the firesteels, the megas doux flew an image of the emperor on horseback as his distinctive ensign.

== Ships ==
=== Dromons and their derivatives ===
The primary warship of the Byzantine navy until the 12th century was the dromon and other similar ship types. Apparently an evolution of the light liburnian galleys of the imperial Roman fleets, the term first appears in the late 5th century, and was firmly defined by the 6th. The term dromon (δρόμων) comes from the Greek root δρομ-(άω), lit. 'to run', thus meaning 'runner'; 6th-century authors like Procopius explicitly underline the speed of these vessels. During the next few centuries, as the naval struggle with the Arabs intensified, heavier versions with two or possibly even three banks of oars evolved. Eventually, the term was used in the general sense of 'warship', and was often used interchangeably with another term for a large warship, chelandion (χελάνδιον, from the Greek word keles, 'courser'), which first appeared during the 8th century.

==== Evolution and features ====
The appearance and evolution of medieval warships is a matter of debate: until recently, no remains of an oared Byzantine warship had been found, and information had to be gathered from literary and artistic evidence. Only in 2005–2006 did archaeological digs for the Marmaray project in the location of the Harbour of Theodosius (modern Yenikapi) uncover the remains of over 36 Byzantine ships from the 6th to 10th centuries, including four light galleys of the galea type. These four galeai, dating to the 10th–11th centuries, are of uniform design and construction, suggesting a centralized manufacturing process. They have a length of c. 30 m, and are built of European Black Pine and Oriental plane.

The accepted view is that the main developments which differentiated the early dromons from the liburnians were the adoption of a full deck (katastrōma), the abandonment of the rams on the bow in favour of an above-water spur, and the gradual introduction of lateen sails. The exact reasons for the abandonment of the ram (Latin: rostrum; ἔμβολος, embolos) are unclear. One possibility is that the change occurred because of the gradual evolution of the shell-first construction method for the hull into the frame-first method, which produced a hull less susceptible to ram attacks. By the early 7th century, the ram's original function had been forgotten: Isidore of Seville believed that they had been used to protect against collision with underwater rocks. Earlier scholars suggested the lateen sail was introduced into the Mediterranean by the Arabs, possibly with an ultimate origin in India, but recent discoveries have suggested early appearances in the Levant in the late Hellenistic or early Roman period. Belisarius' invasion fleet of 533 was apparently at least partly fitted with lateen sails, making it probable that by the time the lateen had become the standard rig for the dromon, with the traditional square sail gradually falling from use in medieval navigation.

The dromons that Procopius describes were single-banked ships of probably 50 oars, arranged with 25 oars on each side. Again unlike Hellenistic vessels, which used an outrigger (parexeiresia), these extended directly from the hull. In the later bireme dromons of the 9th and 10th centuries, the two oar banks (elasiai) were divided by the deck: the rowers of the second oar bank, situated above deck, were expected to fight alongside the marines in boarding operations. Makrypoulias suggests 25 oarsmen beneath and 35 on the deck on either side for a dromon of 120 rowers. The overall length of these ships was probably about 32 meters. Although most contemporary vessels had a single mast (histos or katartion), the larger bireme dromons probably needed at least two masts in order to manoeuvre effectively.

The ship was steered by means of two quarter rudders at the stern (prymne), which also housed a tent (skene) that covered the captain's berth (krab[b]at[t]os). The prow (prora) featured an elevated forecastle (pseudopation), below which the siphon for the discharge of Greek fire projected, although secondary siphons could also be carried amidships on either side. A pavesade (kastelloma) ran around the sides of the ship, providing protection to the deck crew. Larger ships also had wooden castles (xylokastra) on either side between the masts, providing archers with elevated firing platforms. The bow spur (peronion) was intended to break an enemy ship's oars, rendering it helpless.

==== Ship types ====
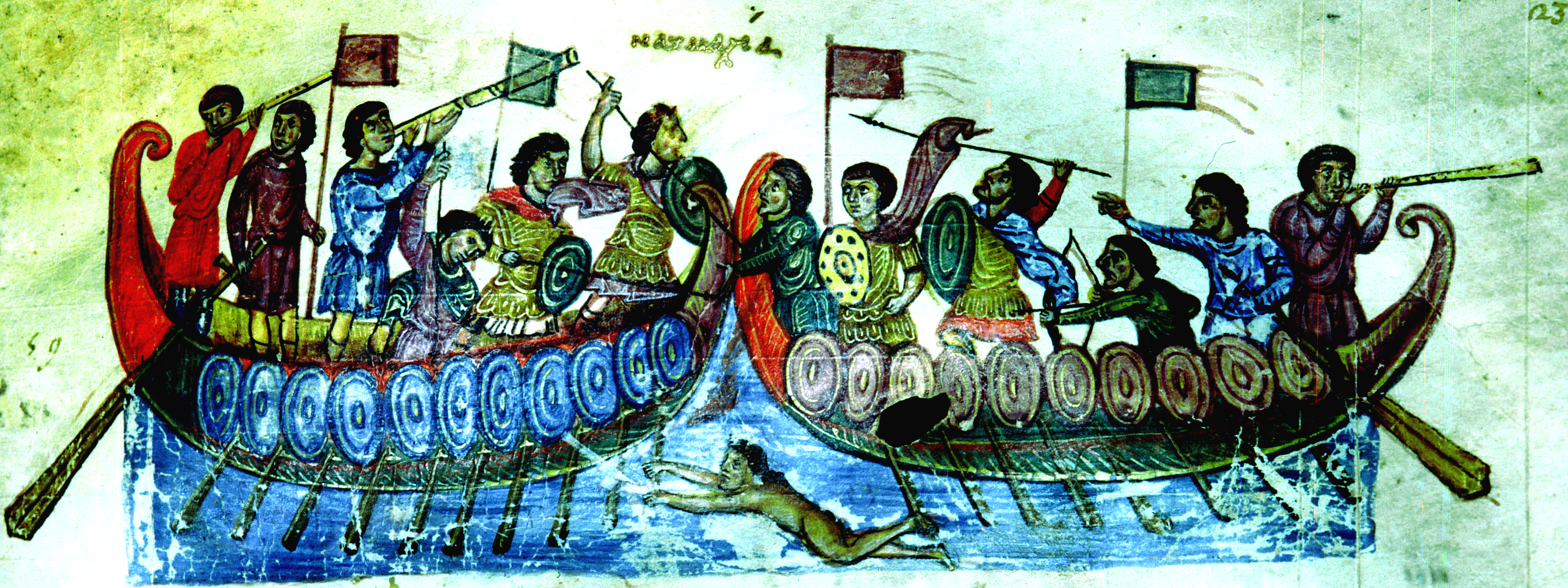
Depiction of a sea battle, from a 13th-century copy of Oppian's Cynegetica

By the 10th century, there were three main classes of bireme (two oar-banks) warships of the general dromon type, as detailed in the inventories for the Cretan expeditions of 911 and 949: the [chelandion] ousiakon ([χελάνδιον] οὑσιακόν), manned by an ousia of 108; the [chelandion] pamphylon ([χελάνδιον] πάμφυλον), crewed with up to 120–160 men; and the dromon proper, crewed by two ousiai. In the De Ceremoniis, the heavy dromon is said to have an even larger crew of 230 rowers and 70 marines; naval historian John H. Pryor considers them as supernumerary crews being carried aboard, while the Greek scholar Christos Makrypoulias suggests that the extra men correspond to a second rower on each of the upper-bank oars. A smaller, single-bank ship, the moneres (μονήρης, 'single-banked') or galea (γαλέα, from which the term 'galley' derives), with c. 60 crew, was used in scouting missions and also in the wings of battle. The galea seems to have been strongly associated with the Mardaites, and Makrypoulias suggests that the ship was exclusively used by them. While three-banked dromons are described in a 9th-century work, this treatise draws heavily upon references to classical triremes, and may well be unreliable concerning middle-period Byzantine warships. The existence of trireme vessels is, however, attested in the Fatimid navy in the 11th and 12th centuries, and references made by Leo VI to large Arab ships in the 10th century may also indicate trireme galleys.

The Byzantines usually commandeered ordinary merchantmen as transport ships (phortegoi) or supply ships (skeuophora). These appear to have been mostly sailing vessels, rather than oared. The Byzantines and Arabs also employed horse-transports (hippagoga), which were either sailing ships or galleys, the latter modified to accommodate the horses. Given that the chelandia appear originally to have been oared horse-transports, this would imply differences in construction between the chelandion and the dromon proper, terms which otherwise are often used indiscriminately in literary sources. In addition, Byzantine sources refer to the sandalos or sandalion (σάνδαλος, σανδάλιον), which was a boat carried along by the bigger ships. The kind described in the De Ceremoniis had a single mast, four oars and a rudder. In the earlier years of the empire, shipbuilding wood for transport and supply ships was mainly from conifers, but in the later years from broad-leaved trees, possibly from forests in what is now Turkey.

=== Western designs of the last centuries ===
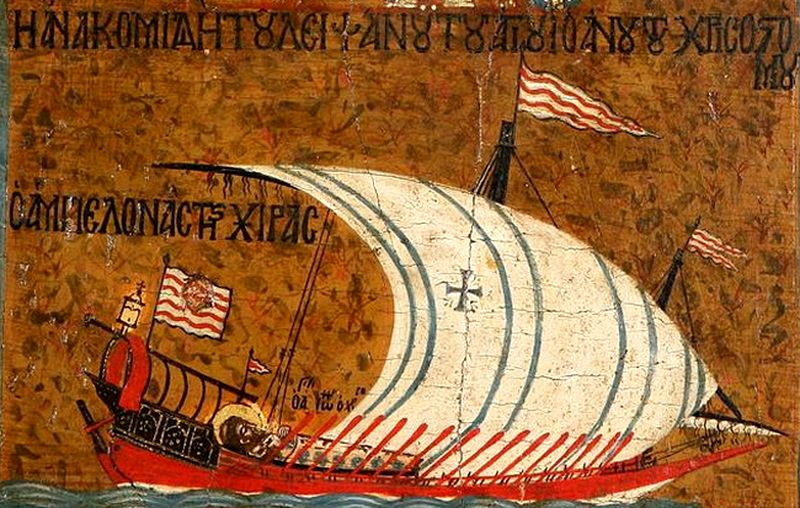
14th-century painting of a light galley, from an icon now at the Byzantine and Christian Museum at Athens

The exact period when the dromon was superseded by galea-derived ships of Italian origin is uncertain. The term dromon continued in use until the late 12th century. Contemporary Western writers used the term to denote large ships, usually transports, and there is evidence to support the idea that this usage had also spread to the Byzantines. William of Tyre's description of the Byzantine fleet in 1169, where "dromons" are classed as very large transports, and the warships with two oar banks are set apart from them, may thus indeed indicate the adoption of the new bireme galley types by the Byzantines. From the 13th century on, the term dromon fell into gradual disuse and was replaced by katergon (κάτεργον, meaning 'detailed to/owing a service'), a late-11th century term referring to the crews. During the latter period of the Byzantine Empire, Byzantine ships were based on Western models: the term katergon is used indiscriminately for both Byzantine and Latin ships, and the horse-carrying chelandion was replaced by the Western taride (adopted as tareta, ταρέτα, in Greek). No construction differences are mentioned between the two, with both terms referring to horse-carrying vessels (usserii) capable of carrying from 20 to 40 horses.

The bireme Italian-style galleys remained the mainstay of Mediterranean fleets until the late 13th century, although contemporary descriptions provide little detail on their construction. From that point on, the galleys universally became trireme ships, i.e. with three men on a single bank located above deck, each rowing a different oar. The Venetians also developed the "great galley", an enlarged galley capable of carrying more cargo for trade. Little is known on particular Byzantine ships during the period. The accounts of the 1437 journey by sea of the Byzantine delegation to the Council of Florence mention that most of the ships were Venetian or Papal, but also record that Emperor John VIII travelled on an "imperial ship" of unclear provenance and type. It was recorded to be faster than the great galleys accompanying it, possibly indicating that it was a light war galley.

== Tactics and weapons ==
The Byzantines preserved the lessons of warfare at land and sea, through the use of military manuals, which form the basis of our knowledge on Byzantine naval affairs. The main surviving texts are the chapters on sea combat (peri naumachias) in the Tactica of Leo the Wise and Nikephoros Ouranos (both drawing extensively from the Naumachiai of Syrianos Magistros and other earlier works), complemented by relevant passages in the De Administrando Imperio of Constantine Porphyrogennetos and other works by Byzantine and Arab writers.

=== Naval strategy, logistics and tactics ===
Galleys did not handle well in rough waters and could be swamped by waves, which would be catastrophic in the open sea; there are numerous historical instances where galley fleets were sunk by bad weather (e.g. the Roman losses during the First Punic War). The sailing season was therefore usually restricted from mid-spring to September. The maintainable cruising speed of a galley, even when using sails, was limited, as were the amount of supplies it could carry. There is no evidence that the navy operated dedicated supply ships to support the warships. Water supplies were of critical importance. With consumption levels estimated at 8 litres a day for every oarsman, its availability was a decisive operational factor in the often hot and dry Eastern Mediterranean. Smaller dromons are estimated to have been able to carry about four days' worth of water. Effectively, this meant that fleets composed of galleys were confined to coastal routes, and had to make frequent landfall to replenish their supplies. For these reasons, Nikephoros Ouranos emphasized the need to have available:

...men with accurate knowledge and experience of the sea [...], which winds cause it to swell and which blow from the land. They should know both the hidden rocks in the sea, and the places which have no depth, and the land along which one sails and the islands adjacent to it, the harbours and the distance such harbours are the one from the other. They should know both the countries and the water supplies.

Medieval Mediterranean naval warfare was therefore coastal in nature, carried out to seize coastal territory or islands, and not to exercise "sea control" as it is understood today. Furthermore, following the abandonment of the ram, sea combat became more unpredictable. Byzantine and Arab manuals thus naturally emphasize cautious tactics, prioritising the preservation of one's own fleet, and the acquisition of accurate intelligence, often through the use of spies. They placed emphasis on achieving tactical surprise and, conversely, on avoiding being caught unprepared by the enemy. Ideally, battle was to be given only when assured of superiority by virtue of numbers or tactical disposition. They also laid importance on matching one's forces and tactics to the prospective enemy: Leo VI, for instance, contrasted the Arabs with their slow, heavy ships to the small and fast craft of the Slavs and Rus'.

On campaign, following the assembly of the various squadrons at fortified bases (aplekta) along the coast, the fleet consisted of the main body of oared warships, and the baggage train (touldon) of sailing vessels and oared transports, which would be sent away in the event of battle. The battle fleet was divided into squadrons, and orders were transmitted from ship to ship through signal flags (kamelaukia) and lanterns. The navy played a key role in supplying land-based forces.

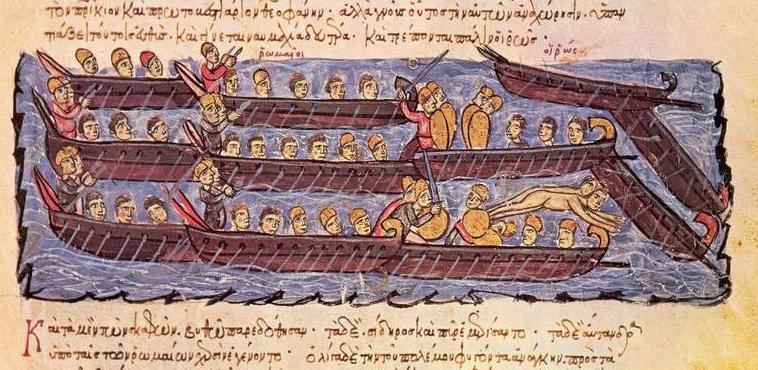
The Byzantine fleet repels the Rus' attack on Constantinople in 941. Boarding actions and hand-to-hand fighting determined the outcome of most naval battles in the Middle Ages. Here the Byzantine dromons are shown rolling over the Rus' vessels and smashing their oars with their spurs.

On the approach to and during an actual battle, a well-ordered formation was critical: if a fleet fell into disorder, its ships would be unable to lend support to each other and probably would be defeated. Fleets that failed to keep an ordered formation or that could not order themselves into an appropriate counter-formation (antiparataxis) to match that of the enemy, often avoided, or broke off from battle. Tactical manoeuvres were therefore intended to disrupt the enemy formation, including the use of various stratagems, such as dividing one's force and carrying out flanking manoeuvres, feigning retreat or hiding a reserve in ambush. According to Leo VI, a crescent formation seems to have been the norm, with the flagship in the centre and the heavier ships at the horns of the formation, in order to turn the enemy's flanks. A range of variants and other tactics and counter-tactics was available, depending on the circumstances.

Once the fleets were close enough, exchanges of missiles began, ranging from combustible projectiles to arrows and javelins. The aim was not to sink ships, but to deplete the ranks of the enemy crews before the boarding actions, which decided the outcome. Once the enemy strength was judged to have been reduced sufficiently, the fleets closed in, the ships grappled each other, and the boarders engaged in hand-to-hand combat.

=== Armament ===
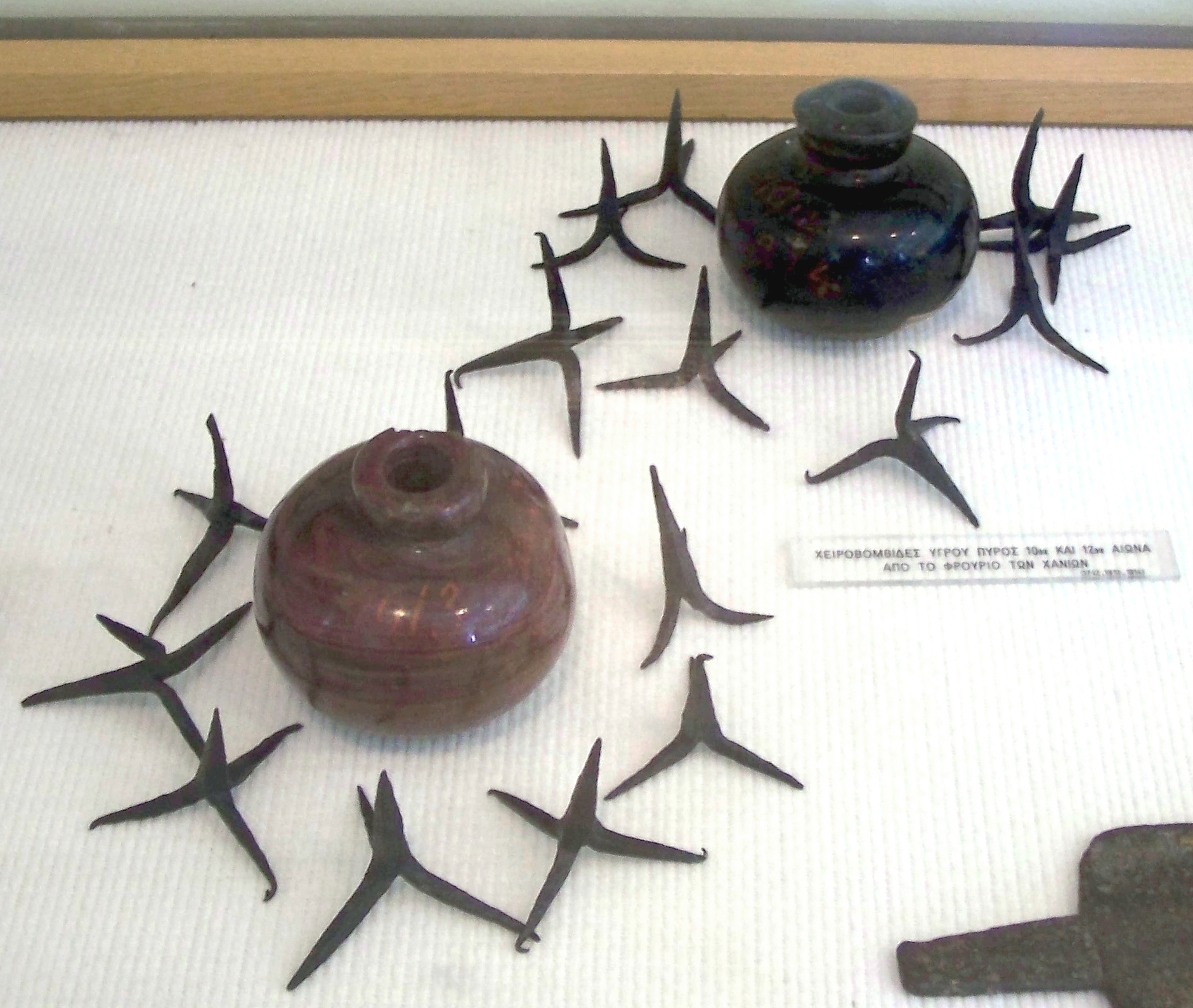
Greek fire grenades and caltrops from Crete, dated to the 10th and 12th centuries

As Byzantine and Arab ships did not feature rams, the primary means of ship-to-ship combat were boarding actions and missile fire, as well as the use of inflammable materials such as Greek fire. Despite the latter's fearsome reputation, it was only effective under certain circumstances, and was not the decisive anti-ship weapon that the ram had been.

Like their Roman predecessors, Byzantine and Muslim ships were equipped with small catapults (mangana) and ballistae (toxoballistrai) that launched stones, arrows, javelins, pots of Greek fire or other incendiary liquids, caltrops (triboloi) and even containers full of lime to choke the enemy or, as Emperor Leo VI suggests, scorpions and snakes. Marines and the upper-bank oarsmen were heavily armoured in preparation for battle and armed with close-combat arms such as lances and swords, while the other sailors wore padded felt jackets (neurika) for protection and fought with bows and crossbows. The importance and volume of missile fire during sea combat can be gauged from the fleet manifests for the Cretan expeditions of the 10th century, which mention 10,000 caltrops, 50 bows and 10,000 arrows, 20 hand-carried ballistrai with 200 bolts (myai, 'flies') and 100 javelins per dromon.

From the 12th century on, the crossbow (called τζᾶγγρα, tzangra in Greek) became increasingly important in Mediterranean warfare. Its use is recorded in some Byzantine sea battles. Unlike the Venetians and Genoese, there is no indication that the Byzantines ever mounted any cannon on ships.

=== Greek fire ===
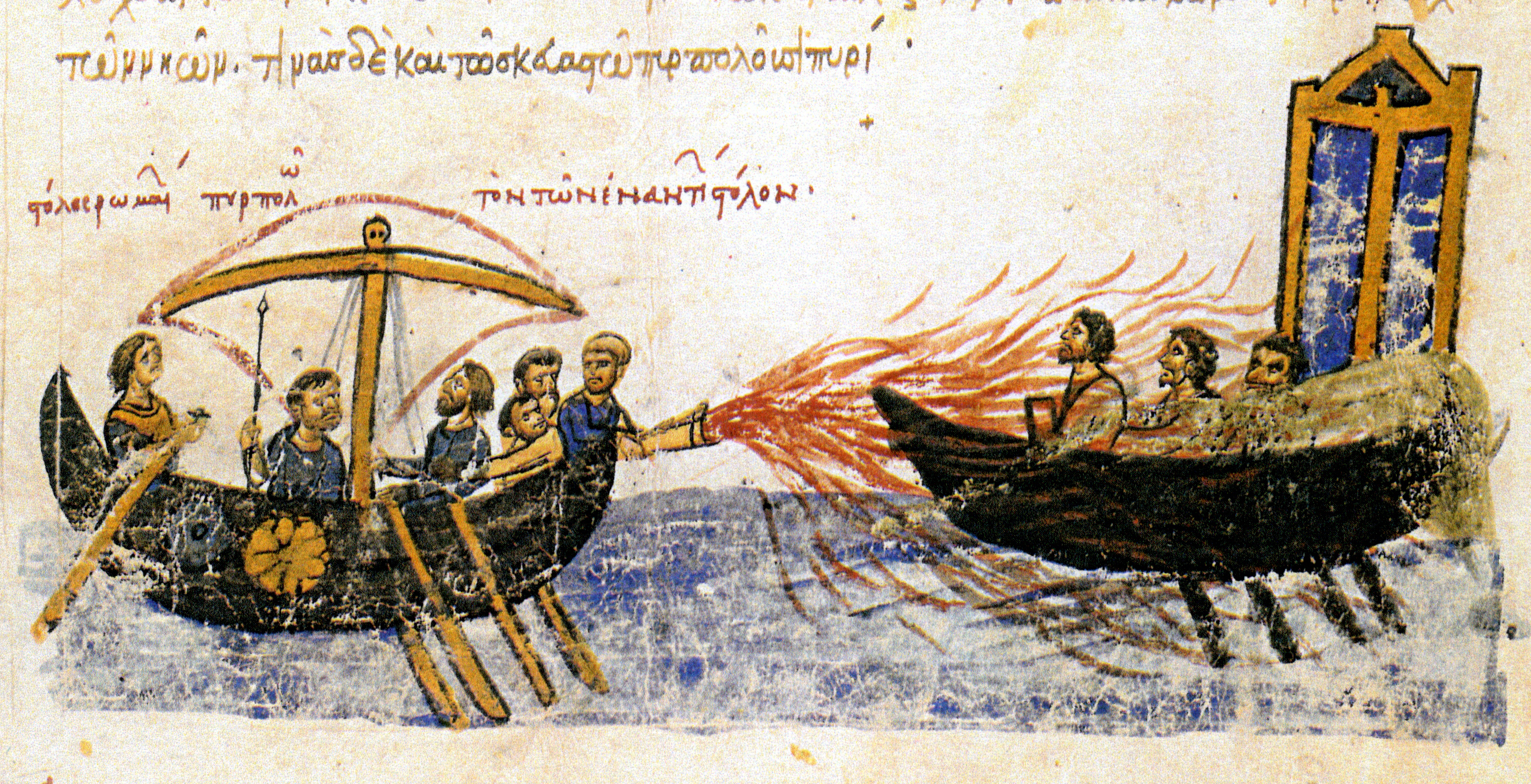
Depiction of the use of Greek fire in the Madrid Skylitzes manuscript

"Greek fire" was the name given by Western Europeans to the flammable concoction used by the Byzantines. The Byzantines themselves used various descriptive names for it, but the most common was 'liquid fire' (ὑγρόν πῦρ). Although the use of incendiary chemicals by the Byzantines has been attested to since the early 6th century, the actual substance known as Greek fire is believed to have been created in 673 and is attributed to an engineer from Syria, named Kallinikos. The most common method of deployment was to emit the formula through a large bronze tube (siphon) onto enemy ships. Alternatively, it could be launched in jars fired from catapults; pivoting cranes (gerania) are also mentioned as a method. Usually the mixture would be stored in heated, pressurized barrels and projected through the tube by some sort of pump while the operators were sheltered behind large iron shields. A portable version (cheirosiphon) also existed, reputedly invented by Leo VI, making it the direct analogue to a modern flamethrower. The means of its production was kept a state secret, and its components are only roughly guessed or described through secondary sources like Anna Komnene, so that its exact composition remains to this day unknown. In its effect, the Greek fire must have been rather similar to napalm. Contemporary sources make clear that it could not be extinguished by water, but rather floated and burned on top of it; sand could extinguish it by depriving it of oxygen, and several authors also mention strong vinegar and old urine as being able to extinguish it. Consequently, felt or hides soaked in vinegar were used to provide protection against it.

"As he [the Emperor] knew that the Pisans were skilled in sea warfare and dreaded a battle with them, on the prow of each ship he had a head fixed of a lion or other land-animal, made in brass or iron with the mouth open and then gilded over, so that their mere aspect was terrifying. And the fire which was to be directed against the enemy through tubes he made to pass through the mouths of the beasts, so that it seemed as if the lions and the other similar monsters were vomiting the fire."

— From the Alexiad of Anna Komnene, XI.10

Despite the occasionally exaggerated accounts of Byzantine writers, it was by no means a "wonder weapon", and did not avert some serious defeats. Given its limited range, and the need for a calm sea and favourable wind conditions, its usability was limited. Nevertheless, in favourable circumstances and against an unprepared enemy, it could prove decisive, as displayed repeatedly against the Rus'. Greek fire continued to be mentioned during the 12th century, but the Byzantines failed to use it against the Fourth Crusade, possibly because they had lost access to the areas (the Caucasus and the eastern coast of the Black Sea) where the primary ingredients were to be found. The Arabs fielded their own 'liquid fire' after 835, but it is unknown if they used the Byzantine formula, possibly obtained through espionage or through the defection of strategos Euphemios in 827, or whether they independently created a version of their own. A 12th-century treatise prepared for Saladin records a version of Greek fire called naft (naphtha).

== Role of the navy in Byzantine history ==
It is not easy to assess the importance of the Byzantine navy to the Empire's history. On one hand, the Empire, throughout its life, had to defend a long coastline, often with little hinterland. In addition, shipping was always the quickest and cheapest way of transport, and the Empire's major urban and commercial centres, as well as most of its fertile areas, lay close to the sea. Coupled with the threat posed by the Arabs in the 7th to 10th centuries, this necessitated the maintenance of a strong fleet. The navy was perhaps at its most significant in the successful defence of Constantinople from the two Arab sieges, which ultimately saved the Empire. Throughout the period, naval operations were an essential part of the Byzantine effort against the Arabs in a game of raids and counter-raids that continued up to the late 10th century.

On the other hand, the limitations of the period's maritime technology meant that neither the Byzantines nor any of their opponents could develop a true thalassocracy. Galley fleets were confined to coastal operations, and were not able to play a truly independent role. Furthermore, as the alternation of Byzantine victories and defeats against the Arabs illustrates, no side was able to permanently gain the upper hand. Although the Byzantines pulled off a number of spectacular successes, these victories were balanced off by similarly disastrous losses. Mutinies by oarsmen in Byzantine fleets also reveal that conditions were often far from the ideal. Combined with the traditional predominance of the land-holders in the higher military and civil offices, all this meant that, as in the Roman Empire, the navy was still regarded largely as an adjunct to the land forces.

It is clear nevertheless that the gradual decline of the indigenous Byzantine naval power in the 10th and 11th centuries, when it was eclipsed by the Italian city-states of Venice and Genoa, was of long-term significance for the fate of the Empire. The calamity of the Fourth Crusade was due in large part to the absolute defencelessness of the Empire at sea. Initiated by Byzantium itself in the 9th century, this process saw the Italian republics profit from their role as intermediaries in the east-west trade, marginalizing the Byzantine merchant marine, which in turn adversely impacted Byzantine naval forces. Inevitably however, the Italian republics began pursuing their own policies, and turned from protection of the Empire to exploitation. The absence of a strong navy was keenly felt by contemporary Byzantines, as the comments of Kekaumenos illustrate. Strong and energetic emperors like Manuel Komnenos, and later Michael VIII Palaiologos, tried to revive naval power, but even after the Venetians were weakened, they were merely replaced with the Genoese and the Pisans. Trade thus remained in Latin hands, profits continued to be siphoned off from the Empire, and after the emperors' deaths, their achievements quickly evaporated. After 1204, the fortunes of the now small Byzantine navy were more or less tied to the shifting alliances with the Italian maritime republics.

When viewing the entire course of Byzantine history, the waxing and waning of the navy's strength closely mirrors the fluctuation of the Empire's fortunes. It is this apparent interrelation that led the French Byzantinist Louis Bréhier to remark: "The epochs of [Byzantium's] dominion are those in which it held control of the sea, and it was when it lost it, that its reverses began."

== Bibliography ==
- Ahrweiler, Hélène (1966), Byzance et la mer. La marine de guerre, la politique et les institutions maritimes de Byzance aux VIIe–XVe siècles (in French), Paris: Presses Universitaires de France
- Akkemik, Ünal; Kocabas, Ufuk (January 2014). "Woods of byzantine trade ships of Yenikapi (Istanbul) and changes in wood use from 6th to 11th century". Mediterranean Archaeology and Archaeometry. 14 (2): 301–311 – via ResearchGate.
- Andriopoulou, Vera; Kondyli, Fotini (19 June 2008). "Ships on the Voyage from Constantinople to Venice". The Syropoulos Project. The Institute of Archaeology and Antiquity of the University of Birmingham.
- Angelov, Dimiter (2007), Imperial Ideology and Political Thought in Byzantium, 1204–1330, Cambridge University Press, ISBN 978-0-521-85703-1
- Bartusis, Mark C. (1997), The Late Byzantine Army: Arms and Society 1204–1453, University of Pennsylvania Press, ISBN 0-8122-1620-2
- Basch, Lucien (2001), "La voile latine, son origine, son évolution et ses parentés arabes", in Tzalas, H. (ed.), Tropis VI, 6th International Symposium on Ship Construction in Antiquity, Lamia 1996 proceedings (in French), Athens: Hellenic Institute for the Preservation of Nautical Tradition, pp. 55–85
- Birkenmeier, John W. (2002), The Development of the Komnenian Army: 1081–1180, Brill, ISBN 90-04-11710-5
- Bréhier, Louis (2000), Les institutions de l'empire byzantin (in French), Paris: Albin Michel, ISBN 978-2-226-04722-9
- Bryer, Anthony Applemore Mornington (1966), "Shipping in the empire of Trebizond", The Mariner's Mirror, 52: 3–12, doi:10.1080/00253359.1966.10659307
- Bury, J. B.; Philotheus (1911). The Imperial Administrative System of the Ninth Century (With a Revised Text of the Kletorologion of Philotheos). London: Oxford University Press.
- Campbell, I.C. (1995), "The Lateen Sail in World History" (PDF), Journal of World History, 6 (1): 1–23, archived from the original (PDF) on 2016-08-04
- Casson, Lionel (1991), The Ancient Mariners: Seafarers and Sea Fighters of the Mediterranean in Ancient Times, Princeton University Press, ISBN 978-0-691-01477-7
- Casson, Lionel (1995), Ships and Seamanship in the Ancient World, Johns Hopkins University Press, ISBN 0-8018-5130-0
- Christides, Vassilios (1981), "The Raids of the Moslems of Crete in the Aegean Sea: Piracy and Conquest", Byzantion, 51: 76–111
- Christides, Vassilios (1984), The Conquest of Crete by the Arabs (ca. 824): A Turning Point in the Struggle between Byzantium and Islam, Academy of Athens, OCLC 14344967
- Cosentino, Salvatore (2008), "Constans II and the Byzantine navy", Byzantinische Zeitschrift, 100 (2): 577–603, doi:10.1515/BYZS.2008.577, ISSN 0007-7704, S2CID 192015598
- Dawes, Elizabeth A., ed. (1928), The Alexiad, London: Routledge & Kegan Paul
- Delgado, James P (2011), "Ships on Land", in Catsambis, Alexis; Ford, Ben; Hamilton, Donny L. (eds.), The Oxford Handbook of Maritime Archaeology, Oxford University Press, pp. 182–191, ISBN 978-0-19-537517-6
- Dotson, John E. (1995). "Economics and Logistics of Galley Warfare". In Morrison, John S.; Gardiner, Robert (eds.). The Age of the Galley: Mediterranean Oared Vessels Since Pre-Classical Times. London: Conway Maritime Press. pp. 218–223. ISBN 0-85177-554-3.
- Dotson, John (2003), "Venice, Genoa and Control of the Seas in the Thirteenth and Fourteenth Centuries", in Hattendorf, John B.; Unger, Richard W. (eds.), War at Sea in the Middle Ages and the Renaissance, Boydell Press, pp. 109–136, ISBN 0-85115-903-6
- Failler, Albert (2003), "L'inscription de l'amiral dans la liste des dignités palatines", Revue des études byzantines (in French), 61: 229–239, doi:10.3406/rebyz.2003.2279
- Geanakoplos, Deno John (1959). Emperor Michael Palaeologus and the West, 1258–1282: A Study in Byzantine-Latin Relations. Cambridge, Massachusetts: Harvard University Press.
- Guilland, Rodolphe (1967). "Le Drongaire de la flotte, le Grand drongaire de la flotte, le Duc de la flotte, le Mégaduc". Recherches sur les institutions byzantines [Studies on the Byzantine Institutions]. Berliner byzantinische Arbeiten 35 (in French). Vol. I. Berlin and Amsterdam: Akademie-Verlag & Adolf M. Hakkert. pp. 535–562. OCLC 878894516.
- Haldon, John (1999). Warfare, State and Society in the Byzantine World, 565–1204. London: UCL Press. ISBN 1-85728-495-X.
- Halm, Heinz (1996). The Empire of the Mahdi: The Rise of the Fatimids. Handbook of Oriental Studies. Vol. 26. Translated by Michael Bonner. Leiden: Brill. ISBN 9004100563.
- Harris, Jonathan (2006), Byzantium and The Crusades, Hambledon & London, ISBN 978-1-85285-501-7
- Heath, Ian (1984), Armies of the Middle Ages, Volume 2: The Ottoman Empire, Eastern Europe and the Near East, 1300–1500, Wargames Research Group
- Heath, Ian; McBride, Angus (1995), Byzantine Armies: AD 1118–1461, Osprey Publishing, ISBN 978-1-85532-347-6
- Hocker, Frederick M. (1995). "Late Roman, Byzantine, and Islamic Galleys and Fleets". In Morrison, John S.; Gardiner, Robert (eds.). The Age of the Galley: Mediterranean Oared Vessels Since Pre-Classical Times. London: Conway Maritime Press. pp. 86–100. ISBN 0-85177-554-3.
- Ibn Khaldūn; Rosenthal, Franz (Ed. & Transl.) (1969), The Muqaddimah: An Introduction to History, Princeton University Press, ISBN 978-0-691-01754-9
- Jenkins, Romilly (1987), Byzantium: The Imperial Centuries, AD 610–1071, University of Toronto Press, ISBN 0-8020-6667-4
- Kastritsis, Dimitris (2007), The Sons of Bayezid: Empire Building and Representation in the Ottoman Civil War of 1402-13, Leiden and Boston: Brill, ISBN 978-90-04-15836-8
- Kazhdan, Alexander, ed. (1991). The Oxford Dictionary of Byzantium. Oxford and New York: Oxford University Press. ISBN 0-19-504652-8.
- Kekaumenos; Tsoungarakis, Dimitris (Ed. & Transl.) (1996), Στρατηγικὸν, Athens: Kanakis Editions, pp. 268–273, ISBN 960-7420-25-X
- Laiou, Angeliki E. (1972), Constantinople and the Latins: The Foreign Policy of Andronicus II, 1282–1328, Harvard University Press, ISBN 0-674-16535-7
- Lane, Frederic Chapin (1973), Venice, a Maritime Republic, Johns Hopkins University Press, ISBN 978-0-8018-1460-0
- Lewis, Archibald Ross; Runyan, Timothy J. (1985), European Naval and Maritime History, 300–1500, Indiana University Press, ISBN 0-253-20573-5
- Loenertz, Raymond-Joseph (1959), "Notes d'histoire et de chronologie byzantines", Revue des études byzantines (in French), 17: 158–167, doi:10.3406/rebyz.1959.1204
- MacCormick, Michael (2002), Origins of the European Economy: Communications and Commerce, A.D. 300–900, Cambridge University Press, ISBN 978-0-521-66102-7
- MacGeorge, Penny (2002), "Appendix: Naval Power in the Fifth Century", Late Roman Warlords, Oxford University Press, ISBN 978-0-19-925244-2
- Macrides, Ruth (2007), George Akropolites: The History – Introduction, Translation and Commentary, Oxford University Press, ISBN 978-0-19-921067-1
- Magdalino, Paul (2002) [1993]. The Empire of Manuel I Komnenos, 1143–1180 (Second ed.). Cambridge: Cambridge University Press. ISBN 9780521526531.
- Makrypoulias, Christos G. (1995), "The Navy in the Works of Constantine Porphyrogenitus", Graeco-Arabica (6), Athens: 152–171
- McMahon, Lucas (2021). "Logistical modelling of a sea-borne expedition in the Mediterranean: the case of the Byzantine invasion of Crete in AD 960". Mediterranean Historical Review. 36 (1): 63–94. doi:10.1080/09518967.2021.1900171. S2CID 235676141.
- Mango, Cyril (2002), The Oxford History of Byzantium, Oxford University Press, ISBN 0-19-814098-3
- Nicol, Donald M. (1988). Byzantium and Venice: A Study in Diplomatic and Cultural Relations. Cambridge: Cambridge University Press. ISBN 0-521-34157-4.
- Nicol, Donald M. (1993) [1972]. The Last Centuries of Byzantium, 1261–1453 (Second ed.). Cambridge: Cambridge University Press. ISBN 978-0-521-43991-6.
- Nicolle, David (1996), Medieval Warfare Source Book: Christian Europe and its Neighbours, Brockhampton Press, ISBN 1-86019-861-9
- Nicolle, David (2005), Constantinople 1453: The End of Byzantium, Praeger Publishers, ISBN 978-0-275-98856-2
- Norwich, John Julius (1990), Byzantium: The Early Centuries, Penguin Books, ISBN 978-0-14-011447-8
- Norwich, John Julius (1996), Byzantium: The Decline and Fall, Penguin Books, ISBN 978-0-14-011449-2
- Norwich, John Julius (1999), Byzantium: The Apogee, Penguin Books, ISBN 978-0-14-011448-5
- Pomey, Patrice (2006), "The Kelenderis Ship: A Lateen Sail", The International Journal of Nautical Archaeology, 35 (2): 326–329, Bibcode:2006IJNAr..35..326P, doi:10.1111/j.1095-9270.2006.00111.x, S2CID 162300888
- Phillips, Jonathan (2004), The Fourth Crusade and the sack of Constantinople, Viking, ISBN 978-0-14-303590-9
- Pryor, John H. (1988), Geography, Technology, and War: Studies in the Maritime History of the Mediterranean, 649–1571, Cambridge University Press, ISBN 0-521-42892-0
- Pryor, John H. (1995). "From Dromōn to Galea: Mediterranean Bireme Galleys AD 500–1300". In Morrison, John S.; Gardiner, Robert (eds.). The Age of the Galley: Mediterranean Oared Vessels Since Pre-Classical Times. London: Conway Maritime Press. pp. 101–116. ISBN 0-85177-554-3.
- Pryor, John H. (1995). "The Geographical Conditions of Galley Navigation in the Mediterranean". In Morrison, John S.; Gardiner, Robert (eds.). The Age of the Galley: Mediterranean Oared Vessels Since Pre-Classical Times. London: Conway Maritime Press. pp. 206–217. ISBN 0-85177-554-3.
- Pryor, John H. (2003), "Byzantium and the Sea: Byzantine Fleets and the History of the Empire in the Age of the Macedonian Emperors, c. 900–1025 CE", in Hattendorf, John B.; Unger, Richard W. (eds.), War at Sea in the Middle Ages and the Renaissance, Boydell Press, pp. 83–104, ISBN 0-85115-903-6
- Pryor, John H.; Jeffreys, Elizabeth M. (2006), The Age of the ΔΡΟΜΩΝ: The Byzantine Navy ca. 500–1204, Brill Academic Publishers, ISBN 978-90-04-15197-0
- Runciman, Steven (1975), "Byzantine Civilisation", Nature, vol. 134, Taylor & Francis, p. 795, Bibcode:1934Natur.134S.795., doi:10.1038/134795c0, ISBN 978-0-416-70380-1, S2CID 4118229
- Scafuri, Michael P. (2002), Byzantine Naval Power and Trade: The Collapse of the Western Frontier (PDF), Texas A & M University
- Setton, Kenneth M. (1978). The Papacy and the Levant (1204–1571), Volume II: The Fifteenth Century. Vol. 2. Philadelphia: The American Philosophical Society. ISBN 0-87169-127-2.
- Tougher, Shaun (1997), The Reign of Leo VI (886–912): Politics and People, Brill, ISBN 90-04-09777-5
- Treadgold, Warren (1997). A History of the Byzantine State and Society. Stanford, California: Stanford University Press. ISBN 0-8047-2630-2.
- Treadgold, Warren T. (1998), Byzantium and Its Army, 284–1081, Stanford University Press, ISBN 0-8047-3163-2
- Turtledove, Harry, ed. (1982), The chronicle of Theophanes: an English translation of anni mundi 6095–6305 (A.D. 602–813), University of Pennsylvania Press, ISBN 978-0-8122-1128-3
- Lilie, Ralph-Johannes (1994), Byzantium and the Crusader States: 1096–1204, Oxford University Press, ISBN 0-19-820407-8
- Verpeaux, Jean, ed. (1966). Pseudo-Kodinos, Traité des Offices (in French). Paris: Centre National de la Recherche Scientifique.
