= Battle of Milazzo =

Battle of Milazzo may refer to the following battles fought near the city of Milazzo in Sicily, southern Italy:

- Battle of Mylae (260 BC)
- Battle of Milazzo (880)
- Battle of Milazzo (888)
- Battle of Milazzo (1718), during the War of the Quadruple Alliance
- Battle of Milazzo (1719)
- Battle of Milazzo (1860)
