= Basil Hexamilites =

Basil Hexamilites (Greek: Βασίλειος Ἑξαμιλίτης, fl. 956) was a Byzantine military leader who won a major victory against the Hamdanid navy of Tarsus.

== Biography ==
As his surname indicates, he hailed from Hexamilion in eastern Thrace.

In c. 955 he was a patrikios and the military governor (strategos) of the naval Cibyrrhaeot Theme. Theophanes Continuatus reports that he was still young, but an experienced and capable commander. Since the late 9th century, the fleet of the Muslim frontier emirate of Tarsus in Cilicia had been a major threat for Byzantium. In Hexamilites' time, the city of Tarsus had come under the control of the Hamdanid emir of Aleppo, Sayf al-Dawla. Despite his disposing of fewer ships, Hexamilites led his fleet against the Tarsians, sinking many ships with Greek fire—which may indicate that his forces had been augmented with ships from the central Imperial Fleet—and inflicting many casualties and taking many prisoners. According to the Muslim historian Ibn al-Athir, this action took place in September/October 956 and cost the Tarsians 1,800 dead.

This victory was crucial for Byzantium, as it crippled the Tarsian fleet and opened the way the expedition to recover Crete, led by Nikephoros Phokas, in 960–961.

== Sources ==
- Lilie, Ralph-Johannes; Ludwig, Claudia; Pratsch, Thomas; Zielke, Beate (2013). Prosopographie der mittelbyzantinischen Zeit Online. Berlin-Brandenburgische Akademie der Wissenschaften. Nach Vorarbeiten F. Winkelmanns erstellt (in German). Berlin and Boston: De Gruyter.
- Pryor, John H.; Jeffreys, Elizabeth M. (2006). The Age of the ΔΡΟΜΩΝ: The Byzantine Navy ca. 500–1204. Leiden: Brill Academic Publishers. ISBN 978-90-04-15197-0.
