= Battle of Cephalonia =

Medieval naval battle between the Eastern Roman Empire and the Aghlabids; Roman victory

- Part of the Arab–Byzantine wars
- Map of the Arab–Byzantine naval conflict in the Mediterranean, 7th–11th centuries
Date	880
Location	at or near Cephalonia, Greece
Result	Byzantine victory

Belligerents
Byzantine Empire	Aghlabids

Commanders and leaders
Nasar	Unknown

Strength
Unknown; ships from the Imperial Fleet and troops from the Theme of the Peloponnese	60 "exceedingly large" ships

Casualties and losses
Unknown	Very heavy

The Battle of Cephalonia was a naval battle fought between the Byzantine and Aghlabid fleets near Cephalonia, off the western coast of Greece. The battle was a major Byzantine victory, and one of the rare naval battles that took place during the night in the Middle Ages.

In 880, a fleet from the Aghlabid emirate of Ifriqiya sailed against the Byzantine Empire and raided the western coasts of Greece. John Skylitzes reports that it numbered sixty "exceedingly large" ships, and that it raided the Ionian Islands of Zakynthos and Cephalonia. When news of this raid reached the Byzantine capital, Constantinople, a fleet was dispatched to confront them, headed by the newly appointed droungarios of the Imperial Fleet, Nasar. Thanks to favourable wind, the fleet soon reached the port of Methone on the southern tip of Greece, but there was forced to halt, as many of the fleet's oarsmen had deserted in small groups out of fear of the impending battle. Nasar was therefore forced to tarry at Methone, where he brought his fleet back up to strength from the local troops of the theme of the Peloponnese. In the meantime, Nasar informed Emperor Basil I of the events, and Basil was quickly able to capture the deserters. In order to restore discipline among the rest of the fleet, the Emperor then selected 30 Saracen prisoners of war, had their features obscured by soot, and had them publicly flogged in the Hippodrome of Constantinople, before sending them away, ostensibly to be executed at Methone.

The Aghlabid fleet had also learned of the Byzantine fleet's reluctance to engage them, and had grown overconfident. The crews left their ships and pillaged the coasts heedlessly, so that when Nasar arrived with his fleet, they were caught unawares and were annihilated in a night attack. According to the report of Skylitzes, many perished on board their ships when they were set on fire. As the historians John Pryor and Elizabeth Jeffreys write, Nasar's decision to attack at night was an "extremely bold" one, as darkness "made tactical manoeuvring impossible and outcomes unpredictable". Consequently, night battles at sea were very rare. Following his victory, Nasar sailed to southern Italy to assist the army operating there under generals Prokopios and Leo Apostyppes. There he raided Sicily and scored another great victory over an Aghlabid fleet at the Battle of Stelai before returning to Constantinople.

== Sources ==
- Eickhoff, Ekkehard (1966). Seekrieg und Seepolitik zwischen Islam und Abendland: das Mittelmeer unter byzantinischer und arabischer Hegemonie (650-1040) (in German). De Gruyter.
- Lilie, Ralph-Johannes; Ludwig, Claudia; Pratsch, Thomas; Zielke, Beate (2013). Prosopographie der mittelbyzantinischen Zeit Online. Berlin-Brandenburgische Akademie der Wissenschaften. Nach Vorarbeiten F. Winkelmanns erstellt (in German). Berlin and Boston: De Gruyter.
- Pryor, John H.; Jeffreys, Elizabeth M. (2006). The Age of the ΔΡΟΜΩΝ: The Byzantine Navy ca. 500–1204. Leiden and Boston: Brill Academic Publishers. ISBN 978-90-04-15197-0.
- Wortley, John, ed. (2010). John Skylitzes: A Synopsis of Byzantine History, 811–1057. Cambridge: Cambridge University Press. ISBN 978-0-521-76705-7.
