= Nasar =

Nasar (Greek: Νάσαρ), originally baptized Basil (Greek: Βασίλειος), was a distinguished Byzantine military leader in the Byzantine–Arab conflicts of the latter half of the 9th century.

== Biography ==
Not much is known about Nasar's family. His father Christopher held the supreme court position of magistros, and he had a brother named Barsanes. On account of his name, the historian Michele Amari speculated that he was of Syrian, perhaps Mardaite, origin.

Under Emperor Michael III (r. 842–867), he was appointed stratēgos of the Bucellarian Theme, one of the largest and most important of the Byzantine Empire's themata. In this capacity, together with the patrician Petronas, he participated in the Battle of Lalakaon in 863, where the Byzantines inflicted a crushing defeat on Umar al-Aqta, the emir of Melitene. On their return to Constantinople, the two generals celebrated a triumph in the Hippodrome.

In 879 or 880, Nasar replaced Niketas Oryphas as the droungarios tou ploimou, commander of the Byzantine navy's Constantinople-based Imperial Fleet, and was sent by Emperor Basil I against the Aghlabid fleet that was raiding the Ionian Islands. A mutiny of the fleet's rowers forced him to stop for a while at Methoni, but discipline was restored and the crews strengthened with troops of the local theme. Nasar proceeded to score a significant victory in a night battle over the Aghlabids with the aid of Greek fire.

Nasar then proceeded to raid Sicily, capturing many Arab ships and carrying off much booty and merchandise. Reportedly, the price of olive oil in the markets of Constantinople fell sharply as a result. He then went on to support the concurrent land operations by the Byzantine generals Prokopios and Leo Apostyppes in southern Italy, before defeating another Aghlabid fleet off the coast of Calabria; at the same time, another Byzantine squadron scored a significant victory at Naples. These victories were crucial to the restoration of Byzantine control over southern Italy (the future Catepanate of Italy), compensating to an extent for the effective loss of Sicily following the fall of Syracuse in 878.

== Sources ==
- Kazhdan, Alexander, ed. (1991). The Oxford Dictionary of Byzantium. New York and Oxford: Oxford University Press. ISBN 978-0-19-504652-6.
- Pryor, John H.; Jeffreys, Elizabeth M. (2006). The Age of the ΔΡΟΜΩΝ: The Byzantine Navy ca. 500–1204. Leiden, The Netherlands and Boston, Massachusetts: Brill Academic Publishers. ISBN 978-90-04-15197-0.
- Lilie, Ralph-Johannes; Ludwig, Claudia; Zielke, Beate; Pratsch, Thomas, eds. (2013). "Prosopographie der mittelbyzantinischen Zeit Online". Prosopographie der mittelbyzantinischen Zeit Online. Berlin-Brandenburgische Akademie der Wissenschaften. Nach Vorarbeiten F. Winkelmanns erstellt (in German). De Gruyter.
