= Ancient shipbuilding techniques =

Ancient boat building methods can be categorized as one of hide, log, sewn, lashed-plank, clinker (and reverse-clinker), shell-first, and frame-first. While the frame-first technique dominates the modern ship construction industry, the ancients relied primarily on the other techniques to build their watercraft. In many cases, these techniques were very labor-intensive or inefficient in their use of raw materials. Regardless of differences in ship construction techniques, the vessels of the ancient world, particularly those that plied the waters of the Mediterranean Sea and the islands of Southeast Asia were seaworthy craft, capable of allowing people to engage in large-scale maritime trade.

== History ==
The earliest archaeological evidence comes from dugout canoes found in peat bogs in Pesse, the Netherlands, and dates to around 8000 years ago. Seafaring is found around the world, and many of these techniques are still in use today.

== Framed boats ==
=== Skin boats ===
Skin boats dominated seafaring in places that were scarce on wood, including the arctic and subarctic. They were made by stretching skin or leather over frames of wood or bone. These include kayaks and umiaks, coracles and currachs.

=== Bark canoes ===
Bark canoes were made by stretching bark over wooden frames, and were used by many Indigenous populations over the world, including Native Americans and First Nations people in Australia.

== Early wooden boats ==
=== Rafts ===
Rafts were made where wood was available but not large enough to carve into dugouts and they could also be made from reeds. The earliest Egyptian boats were rafts made of papyrus; wooden boats did not replace rafts until the Gerzean/Naqada II Period.

=== Dugout boats ===
Dugout boats were made wherever trees grew large enough to support them, including Holocene Europe, Northeastern Nigeria the West Coast of America, and Polynesian seafarers. Dugouts are defined as being carved out of a single piece of wood, and they could be elaborately decorated and quite seaworthy.

== Shell-first ==
The shell-first technique involves constructing the "shell" of the boat first, then laying in the framework.

=== Sewn and lashed-plank ===
Instead of using nails, the planks of a boat can be "sewn" together with rope. Evidence for the use of sewn-fastenings in plank boats has been found worldwide. Fastenings of this type have been demonstrated to perform well in coastal regions, being capable of withstanding the rigors of heavy surf as well as the impact of beaching. The lashed-plank technique can be found worldwide as well.

=== Clinker and reverse clinker ===
The clinker and reverse-clinker construction techniques involve fastening together an overlapping layer of planks with straight nails (clinker) or hooked nails (reverse clinker). The clinker tradition developed in Northern Europe, while the reverse-clinker technique, although rarely found worldwide, has been found to be prevalent among certain South Asian communities, such as that of Orissa in India.

=== Mortise-and-tenon joint ===
Assembling a ship hull's planks by mortise and tenon joint strengthened with dowels

This construction technique relied extensively on structural support provided by peg-mortise-and-tenon joinery through the shell of the boat. This method of ship construction appears to have originated from the seafaring nations of the Mediterranean, although evidence of peg-mortise-and-tenon joinery later appears in Southeast Asia.

== Frame-first ==
Frame-first construction involves laying down the framework of the vessel before attaching the planks to the boat. This is normally done by erecting a "master frame" in the center of the keel, and deriving the shapes of the other frames using a curved piece of wood stretched between the frame and the end posts, or through a geometric curve. The Yassi Ada wreck dating to the 7th century AD was long cited as the earliest evidence for frame-first construction technique, but two wrecks for Dor (Tanura) Lagoon in Israel dated to around 500 AD were built frame first. This technique was rarer in the rest of the world until the coming of the modern era.

== See also ==
- Ancient navies and vessels
- Boat building
- Shipbuilding
