= Battle of Stelai =

Historic Mediterranean naval battle

- Part of the Arab–Byzantine wars
- Map of the Arab–Byzantine naval conflict in the Mediterranean, 7th–11th centuries
Date	880
Location	off southwestern Calabria
Result	Byzantine victory

Belligerents
Byzantine Empire	Aghlabids

Commanders and leaders
Nasar	al-Husayn ibn Rabah

Strength
140 ships (Ibn Idari)	45 ships (Vita Eliae iuioris)

Casualties and losses
Unknown	Heavy, all ships captured

The Battle of Stelai was a naval battle fought in 880 between the Byzantine and Aghlabid fleets off the southern Italian Peninsula. The battle was a major Byzantine victory. Its location is disputed, hence it is also known as the First Battle of Milazzo or the Battle of Punta Stilo in modern literature.

== Background ==
In 879 or 880, Emperor Basil I the Macedonian appointed Nasar as the commander of the Imperial Fleet. Nasar's first task was to confront a raid by a fleet of 60 ships, sent by the Aghlabid emirate of Ifriqiya against the western coasts of Greece. After defeating this fleet, Nasar sailed on to Italy to support the operations of an army sent to recover southern Italy, under the command of generals Prokopios and Leo Apostyppes.

== Battle ==
During these operations, according to the 14th-century historian Ibn Idari, Nasar was confronted by the Aghlabid governor of Sicily, al-Husayn ibn Rabah. Ibn Idari reports that Nasar's fleet numbered 140 vessels, and that after a fierce battle, the Aghlabids were defeated and many of their ships captured. Ibn al-Athir also mentions this battle, which is also generally identified with the battle reported by the Cambridge Chronicle and the attempted Aghlabid attack on Rhegion reported in the Vita Eliae iunioris hagiography. According to the Vita, the Aghlabid fleet with 45 ships threatened an invasion of Calabria, and the local population prepared to evacuate to the mountains of Aspromonte. Saint Elias of Enna however confidently predicted the victory of the imperial fleet. Nasar indeed defeated the Aghlabids, many of whom abandoned their ships on the coast of Sicily and fled to Palermo; all Aghlabid vessels were captured by the Byzantines.

== Localization ==
The localization of the battle is unclear. The Cambridge Chronicle gives the site of the battle as Mylas, which has led to identification with Milazzo in northeastern Sicily. Theophanes Continuatus places the battle at the "island called Stelai", which in turn has led to the hypothesis that the battle took place at the cape now known as Punta Stilo, at the southeastern coast of Calabria. The Byzantinist Vera von Falkenhausen on the other hand pointed out that the end of the Roman road leading from Rome to Rhegion was marked by a column (stylos or stele in Greek) located on a cliff overlooking the coast, and that the locality was known as Stylis in Greek. According to Ewald Kislinger, the latter site, at the western end of the "toe" of the Italian peninsula, corresponds better to both the localization in the narrative of Theophanes Continuatus as well as the report in the Cambridge Chronicle, and that "Mylas" is probably due to a confusion with another battle that took place near Milazzo eight years later.

== Aftermath ==
Nasar's victory at Stelai enabled the Byzantines to send another squadron to Naples, where it scored a victory over the Arabs. At the same time, Nasar was free to raid the northern coasts of Sicily, intercepting many corsairs and traders operating in the Tyrrhenian Sea. Much booty was taken, particularly olive oil—so much, in fact, that when it was brought back to Constantinople, market prices plummeted. These operations also had the side-effect of worsening the food situation in Ifriqiya, where the harvest had failed that year. Nasar also assisted the land army under Prokopios and Apostyppes in recovering the Lombard-controlled part of Calabria beyond the river Crati, before sailing home. Despite the death of Prokopios in battle shortly after, Apostyppes was able to recover Tarento, thereby restoring the overland connection between the Byzantine provinces in Calabria and around Bari.

These victories were followed by the dispatch of an expeditionary corps under Nikephoros Phokas the Elder in ca. 885; Phokas succeeded in recovering several cities and consolidating Byzantine control in southern Italy (the future Catepanate of Italy), compensating to an extent for the effective loss of Sicily following the fall of Syracuse in 878. The revival was brief, however, as the Byzantine defeat at Milazzo in 888 signalled the virtual disappearance of major Byzantine naval activity in the seas around Italy for the next century.

== Sources ==
- Eickhoff, Ekkehard (1966). Seekrieg und Seepolitik zwischen Islam und Abendland: das Mittelmeer unter byzantinischer und arabischer Hegemonie (650-1040) (in German). De Gruyter.
- Kislinger, Ewald (1995). "Milazzo-Stelai (880 d. Cr.): una battaglia navale cambia luogo". Archivio Storico Messinese (in Italian). 69: 5–12.
- Lilie, Ralph-Johannes; Ludwig, Claudia; Pratsch, Thomas; Zielke, Beate (2013). Prosopographie der mittelbyzantinischen Zeit Online. Berlin-Brandenburgische Akademie der Wissenschaften. Nach Vorarbeiten F. Winkelmanns erstellt (in German). Berlin and Boston: De Gruyter.
- Pryor, John H.; Jeffreys, Elizabeth M. (2006). The Age of the ΔΡΟΜΩΝ: The Byzantine Navy ca. 500–1204. Leiden, The Netherlands and Boston, Massachusetts: Brill Academic Publishers. ISBN 978-90-04-15197-0.
