= Leo Apostyppes =

Byzantine military leader

Leo Apostyppes or Apostoupes (Greek: Λέων ὁ Ἀποστύππης/Ἀποστούπης) was a Byzantine military leader active in the 880s.

He appears in 880, as military governor (strategos) of the themes of Macedonia and Thrace, leading the troops of these two provinces in a campaign in southern Italy. The expedition was commanded by the protovestiarios Prokopios, which possibly indicates that Apostyppes was sent to Italy as reinforcement of the original expedition. The expedition, supported by a fleet under Nasar, was initially successful in its operations to recover the cities of Calabria, but the dual command of the land forces proved fatal when Apostyppes and Prokopios quarreled: during a battle Prokopios found himself in danger, but Apostyppes refused to send troops to his aid, with the result that Prokopios' part of the army was defeated and he himself slain. Apostyppes was able to retreat with his own troops and with the surviving men of Prokopios' detachment, and even went on to capture Taranto. Nevertheless, when Emperor Basil I heard of the events, he dismissed Apostyppes and banished him to house arrest near Kotyaion.

Shortly after, however, two of Apostyppes' subordinates, the protostrator Baianos and the koubikoularios Chamaretos, wrote to the Emperor accusing Apostyppes of having planned Prokopios' death since the beginning, and of plotting against Basil himself. The two sons of Apostyppes, Bardas and David, learned of these accusations and killed Baianos, whereupon they along with Leo tried to flee to the Abbasid Caliphate. They were intercepted by the manglabites Bartzapedon, however, who killed Bardas and David when they tried to resist. Leo was brought back to Constantinople, where he had an eye and an arm cut off and was banished to Mesembria.

== Sources ==
- Lilie, Ralph-Johannes; Ludwig, Claudia; Pratsch, Thomas; Zielke, Beate (2013). Prosopographie der mittelbyzantinischen Zeit Online. Berlin-Brandenburgische Akademie der Wissenschaften. Nach Vorarbeiten F. Winkelmanns erstellt (in German). Berlin and Boston: De Gruyter.
- Wortley, John, ed. (2010). John Skylitzes: A Synopsis of Byzantine History, 811–1057. Cambridge: Cambridge University Press. ISBN 978-0-521-76705-7.
