= Battle of Milazzo (888) =

- Part of the Muslim conquest of Sicily
- Map of the Arab–Byzantine naval conflict in the Mediterranean, 7th–11th centuries
Date	October 888
Location	off Milazzo, northeastern Sicily
Result	Aghlabid victory

Belligerents
Byzantine Empire	Aghlabids

Commanders and leaders
Unknown	Unknown

Casualties and losses
Variously 5,000–7,000 killed	Unknown

The Battle of Milazzo was a naval battle fought in 888 between the Byzantine and Aghlabid fleets off northeastern Sicily. The battle was a major Aghlabid victory. It is sometimes known as the Second Battle of Milazzo, counting the Battle of Stelai as the First Battle of Milazzo.

== Battle ==
In 888, the Aghlabids mounted a new expedition aimed at Byzantine Calabria, with ships from Sicily as well as Ifriqiya. Off Milazzo, the fleet met a Byzantine squadron of the Imperial Fleet of Constantinople. The ensuing battle is not mentioned by any Byzantine source, but only by Ibn Idhari's al-Bayan al-Mughrib as well as the Cambridge Chronicle. Both agree that it was a crushing Aghlabid victory—their first in open sea combat: reportedly 5,000 Byzantines drowned, and 7,000 in total (or 7,000 more, depending on the translation from the Arabic) were killed.

== Aftermath ==
In the aftermath of this debacle, the Byzantines abandoned many strongholds they had held in the Val Demone, and the remainder, left without hope of Byzantine aid, concluded a truce with the Aghlabid governor of Sicily. Even the garrison and populace of Rhegion are said to have temporarily abandoned their city for fear of Aghlabid attacks.

== Sources ==
- Eickhoff, Ekkehard (1966). Seekrieg und Seepolitik zwischen Islam und Abendland: das Mittelmeer unter byzantinischer und arabischer Hegemonie (650-1040) (in German). De Gruyter.
- Pryor, John H.; Jeffreys, Elizabeth M. (2006). The Age of the ΔΡΟΜΩΝ: The Byzantine Navy ca. 500–1204. Leiden, The Netherlands and Boston, Massachusetts: Brill Academic Publishers. ISBN 978-90-04-15197-0.
