= Abd al-Aziz ibn Shu'ayb =

Last Emir of Crete from 949 to 961

Last Emir of Crete
- Reign: 949–961
- Predecessor: Ali ibn Ahmad
- Successor: Post abolished
- Issue: Anemas
Names
- ʿAbd al-ʿAzīz ibn Shuʿayb ibn ʿUmar al-Qurṭubī al-Ballūṭī
Regnal name
- Abd al-Aziz ibn Shu'ayb
- House: Banū al-Afṣ
- Father: Shu'ayb II
- Religion: Sunni Islam

ʿAbd al-ʿAzīz ibn Shuʿayb ibn ʿUmar al-Qurṭubī al-Ballūṭī (Arabic: عبد العزيز بن شعيب بن عمر القرطبي البلوطي), known as Kouroupas (Greek: Κουρουπᾶς) in the Byzantine sources, was the tenth and last Emir of Crete, ruling from 949 to the Byzantine reconquest of the island in 961.

== Reign and loss of Crete ==
The surviving records on the internal history and rulers of the Emirate of Crete are very fragmentary. Following the studies of George C. Miles with the aid of numismatic evidence, he is tentatively identified as a son of the eighth emir, Shu'ayb II, who ruled c. 940–943, himself the great-great-grandson of the conqueror of Crete and founder of the Emirate of Crete, Abu Hafs Umar. The beginning of his reign is placed in 949, in succession to his uncle Ali. By the Byzantine chroniclers he is chiefly called "Kouroupas", apparently from an Arabic surname al-Qurtubi, "from Cordoba", whence the family had originally come.

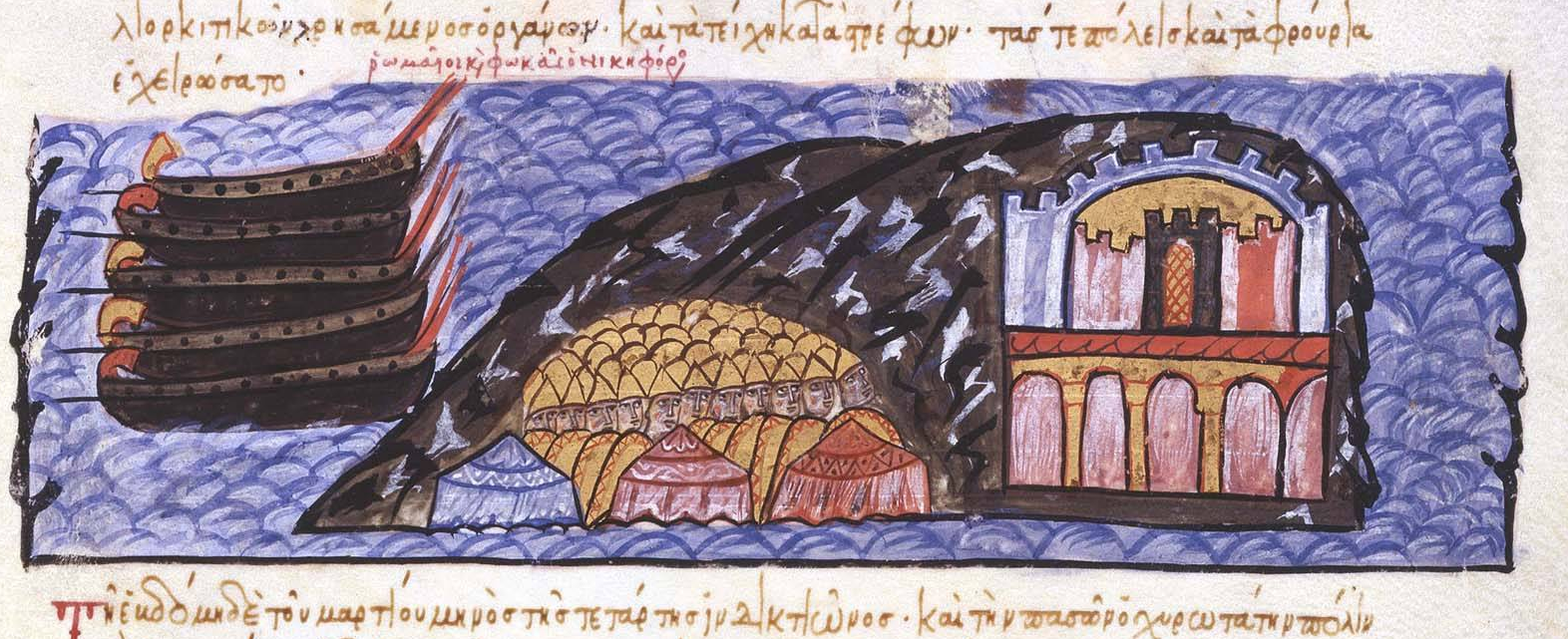
Depiction of the siege of Chandax from the Madrid Skylitzes

The 14th-century Egyptian historian al-Nuwayri reports that the Byzantine emperor Romanos II dispatched three embassies to the island, seeking to conclude a peace treaty in exchange for the payment of an annual sum to Abd al-Aziz, with the purpose of concealing the ongoing preparations for a campaign to recover the island. This report is mostly considered legendary by modern scholars. At the head of a huge fleet and army, Nikephoros Phokas sailed in June or July 960, landed on the island, and defeated the initial Muslim resistance. A long siege of the emirate's capital of Chandax followed, which dragged over the winter into 961. The city was finally stormed on 6 March 961. At this time, Abd al-Aziz is described by Theodosios the Deacon as small, pale, bald, and very ill, but an eloquent and flattering speaker. In vain, the emir sent for aid to the Fatimids in Ifriqiya and the Caliphate of Cordoba in Spain; the Muslim rulers sent envoys to him, but, impressed by the Byzantine might, they refrained from intervening.

== Later life ==
After the capture of Chandax, Abd al-Aziz was taken captive with his family to Constantinople, where they were paraded at Nikephoros Phokas' triumphal procession. They were then given rich presents and an estate to settle by Romanos II. The Byzantine sources report that the emperor considered making Abd al-Aziz a senator, but the latter refused to convert to Christianity. One of his sons, however, al-Nu'man, or Anemas in Greek, converted and entered Byzantine service, until he was killed at the Siege of Dorostolon in 971. Some modern researchers consider it possible that the later Byzantine aristocratic family of the same name descended from him.

== Sources ==
- Canard, M. (1971). "Iḳrīṭis̲h̲". In Lewis, B.; Ménage, V. L.; Pellat, Ch. & Schacht, J. (eds.). The Encyclopaedia of Islam, Second Edition. Volume III: H–Iram. Leiden: E. J. Brill. pp. 1082–1086. OCLC 495469525.
- Kazhdan, Alexander, ed. (1991). The Oxford Dictionary of Byzantium. Oxford and New York: Oxford University Press. ISBN 0-19-504652-8.
- Lilie, Ralph-Johannes; Ludwig, Claudia; Pratsch, Thomas; Zielke, Beate (2013). Prosopographie der mittelbyzantinischen Zeit Online. Berlin-Brandenburgische Akademie der Wissenschaften. Nach Vorarbeiten F. Winkelmanns erstellt (in German). Berlin and Boston: De Gruyter.
- Miles, George C. (1964). "Byzantium and the Arabs: Relations in Crete and the Aegean Area". Dumbarton Oaks Papers. 18: 1–32. doi:10.2307/1291204. JSTOR 1291204.

Preceded by Ali ibn Ahmad	Emir of Crete; 949–961	Byzantine reconquest of Crete
