= Constantine Tessarakontapechys =

Byzantine military governor

Constantine Tessarakontapechys (Greek: Κωνσταντῖνος Τεσσαρακοντάπηχυς) was a Byzantine military governor (strategos) of the theme of the Peloponnese. He is recorded in the history of Genesios as being in office when, sometime in the early reign of Emperor Leo VI the Wise (r. 886–912), the Emir of Crete, Abu Abdallah Umar ibn Shu'ayb, suffered a shipwreck off the coast of the Peloponnese and was taken prisoner when he reached the shore.

== Sources ==
- Lilie, Ralph-Johannes; Ludwig, Claudia; Pratsch, Thomas; Zielke, Beate (2013). Prosopographie der mittelbyzantinischen Zeit Online. Berlin-Brandenburgische Akademie der Wissenschaften. Nach Vorarbeiten F. Winkelmanns erstellt (in German). Berlin and Boston: De Gruyter.
