= Ali ibn Ahmad =

Ninth Emir of Crete from 943 to 949

Ali ibn Ahmad (Arabic: علي بن أحمد) was the ninth Emir of Crete, reigning from c. 943–949.

The surviving records on the internal history and rulers of the Emirate of Crete are very fragmentary. He is tentatively identified as a son of the seventh emir, Ahmad ibn Umar, and as the great-great-grandson of the conqueror of Crete and founder of the emirate, Abu Hafs Umar. He is believed to have reigned from c. 943 to c. 949, succeeding his brother Shu'ayb, and being succeeded by his nephew, Shu'ayb's son, Abd al-Aziz.

He was possibly the ruler of Crete in 949, when a large-scale, seaborne Byzantine expedition was sent against Crete, only for it to be comprehensively defeated by the Cretan Saracens.

== Sources ==
- Canard, M. (1971). "Iḳrīṭis̲h̲". In Lewis, B.; Ménage, V. L.; Pellat, Ch. & Schacht, J. (eds.). The Encyclopaedia of Islam, Second Edition. Volume III: H–Iram. Leiden: E. J. Brill. pp. 1082–1086. OCLC 495469525.
- Miles, George C. (1964). "Byzantium and the Arabs: Relations in Crete and the Aegean Area". Dumbarton Oaks Papers. 18: 1–32. doi:10.2307/1291204. JSTOR 1291204.

Preceded by Shu'ayb ibn Ahmad	Emir of Crete c. 943–949	Succeeded by Abd al-Aziz ibn Shu'ayb
