= Shu'ayb ibn Ahmad =

Eighth Emir of Crete from 940 to 943

Emir of Crete
- Reign: 940–943
- Predecessor: Ahmad ibn Umar
- Successor: Ali ibn Ahmad
- Issue: Abd al-Aziz ibn Shu'ayb
Regnal name
- Shu'ayb ibn Ahmad شعيب بن أحمد
- House: Banū al-Afṣ
- Father: Ahmad ibn Umar
- Religion: Islam

Shu'ayb ibn Ahmad (Arabic: شعيب بن أحمد) was the eighth Emir of Crete, reigning from c. 940–943.

The surviving records on the internal history and rulers of the Emirate of Crete are very fragmentary. He is tentatively identified as a son of the seventh emir, Ahmad ibn Umar, and as the great-great-grandson of the conqueror of Crete and founder of the emirate, Abu Hafs Umar. He is believed to have reigned from c. 940 to c. 943, succeeding his father, and being succeeded by his brother, Ali.

== Sources ==
- Canard, M. (1971). "Iḳrīṭis̲h̲". In Lewis, B.; Ménage, V. L.; Pellat, Ch. & Schacht, J. (eds.). The Encyclopaedia of Islam, Second Edition. Volume III: H–Iram. Leiden: E. J. Brill. pp. 1082–1086. OCLC 495469525.
- Miles, George C. (1964). "Byzantium and the Arabs: Relations in Crete and the Aegean Area". Dumbarton Oaks Papers. 18: 1–32. doi:10.2307/1291204. JSTOR 1291204.

Preceded by Ahmad ibn Umar	Emir of Crete c. 940–943	Succeeded by Ali ibn Ahmad
