= Giovanni Battista Foggini =

Italian sculptor

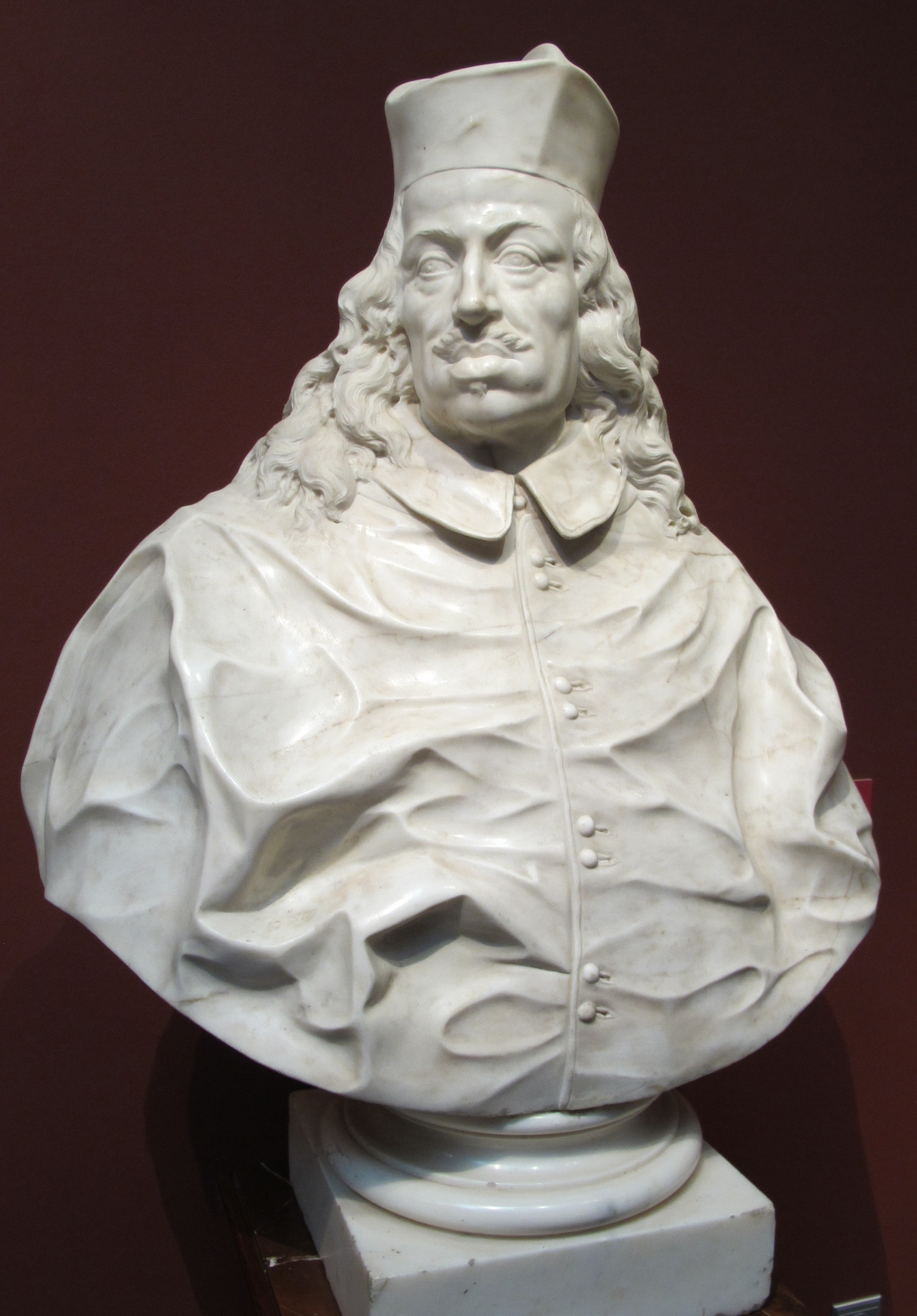
- Bust of Cardinal Leopoldo de' Medici, Pushkin Museum, Moscow
- Born: 25 April 1652; Florence, Grand Duchy of Tuscany
- Died: 12 April 1725 (aged 72); Florence, Grand Duchy of Tuscany
- Known for: Sculpture
- Movement: Baroque
- Children: Pier Francesco Foggini

Giovanni Battista (Giambattista) Foggini (25 April 1652 – 12 April 1725) was an Italian sculptor active in Florence, renowned mainly for small bronze statuary.

== Biography ==
Born in Florence, the young Foggini was sent to Rome by the Medici Grand Duke of Tuscany to join the so-called Accademia Fiorentina, and apprentice in the Roman sculptural studio of Ercole Ferrata, a pupil of Algardi. He was also tutored in drawing by the Accademia's first director (1673–86), Ciro Ferri, who was a pupil of Cortona. Returning to Florence in 1676, he became the court sculptor for Cosimo III.

After the son of Pietro Tacca, Fernando, died in 1686, the mantle of the premier local sculptor fell to Foggini, who would become the Medici's Architetto Primario e Primo scultore della Casa Serenissima as well as Soprintendente dei Lavori (1687–1725). In 1687, Foggini acquired the foundry in Borgo Pinti that had once belonged to the sculptor Giambologna. This allowed him to specialize in small bronzes, produced mainly and profitably for export.

Nearly 400 of Foggini's designs for sculpture, bronze statuettes, furniture and ornaments have survived. Their sculptural quality, the combination of hardstone with mounts which are not merely decorative but often sculptural works of art in their own right, playing a much more dominant role in the total ensemble, characterizes the works made in this period, and distinguishes them from earlier products of the Florentine workshops, or the pieces made by Florentine craftsmen for the Gobelins in Paris. Among his small bronzes David with the Head of Goliath is particularly noteworthy. His adaptation of Pietro Tacca's Moors was the basis of bronze and ceramic reproductions for the connoisseur market well into the 18th century. Many of Foggini's designs were carved by Giuseppe Antonio Torricelli, and resulted in some of the latter's best work.

In Florence, his masterpieces are his sculptural relief work in the Capella Corsini of the Chiesa del Carmine. The Corsini Chapel was erected by Bartolomeo and Cardinal Neri Corsini in memory of their recently canonized ancestral family member, San Andrea Corsini. Foggini's large marble reliefs depict the saint's life: San Andrea in Glory, The Mass of San Andrea Corsini and The Battle of Anghiari (1685–87). Foggini's works from this period also include the reliefs realized for the Cappella Feroni in the Annunziata.

Foggini's pupils included Fernando Fuga, his nephew Filippo della Valle, Balthasar Permoser, Giovacchino Fortini and Giovanni Baratta. Massimiliano Soldani Benzi was a contemporary student with Foggini in Rome and also active in small bronze sculpture. Foggini's many pupils prolonged his style well past the middle of the 18th century and until the advent of Neoclassicism.

== Gallery ==
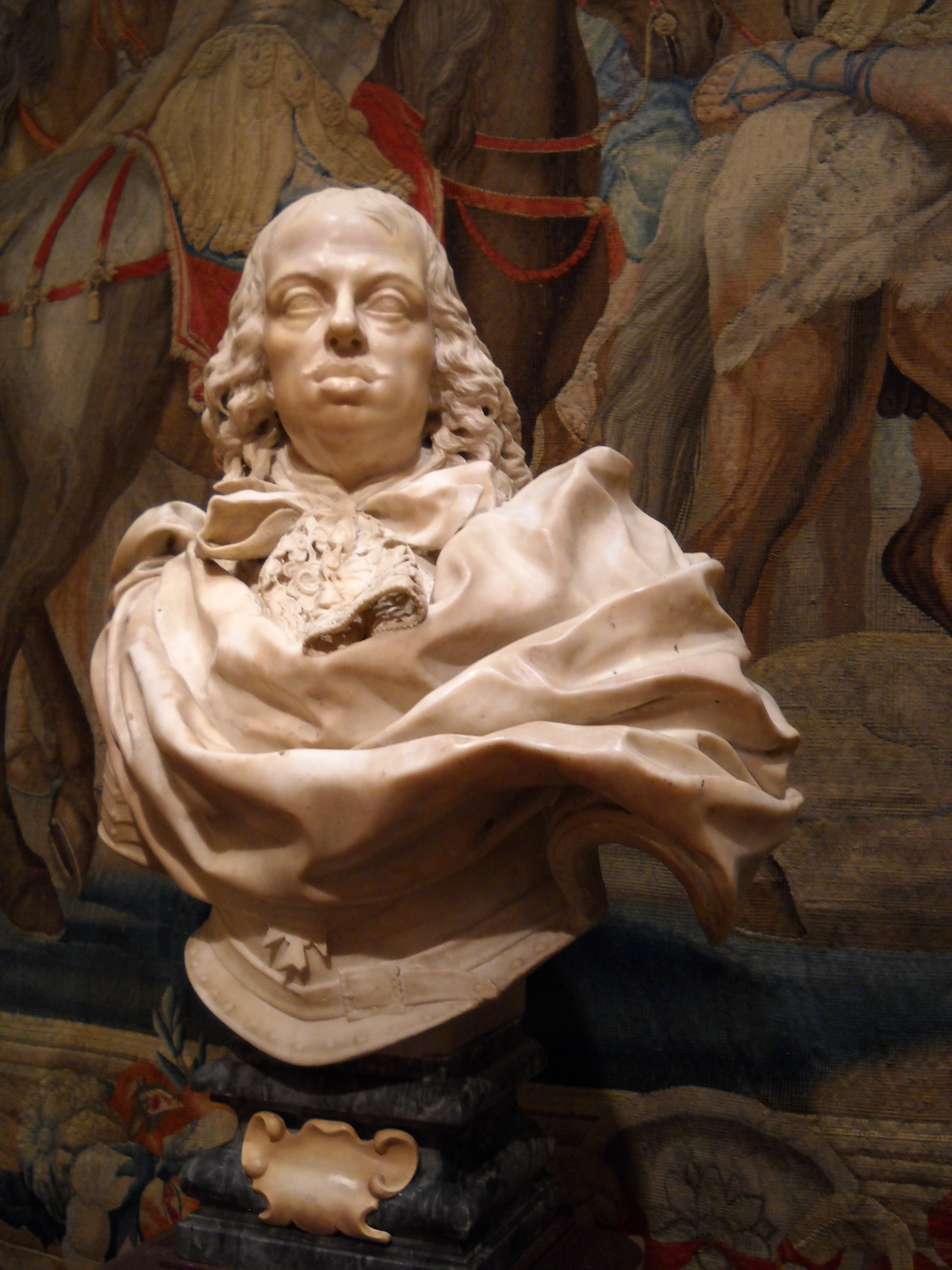
Grand Duke of Tuscany Cosimo III de' Medici - 1683 - Metropolitan Museum of Art, New York City

Grand Prince Ferdinando de Medici - Giovanni Battista Foggini - 1683 - Metropolitan Museum of Art - New York City

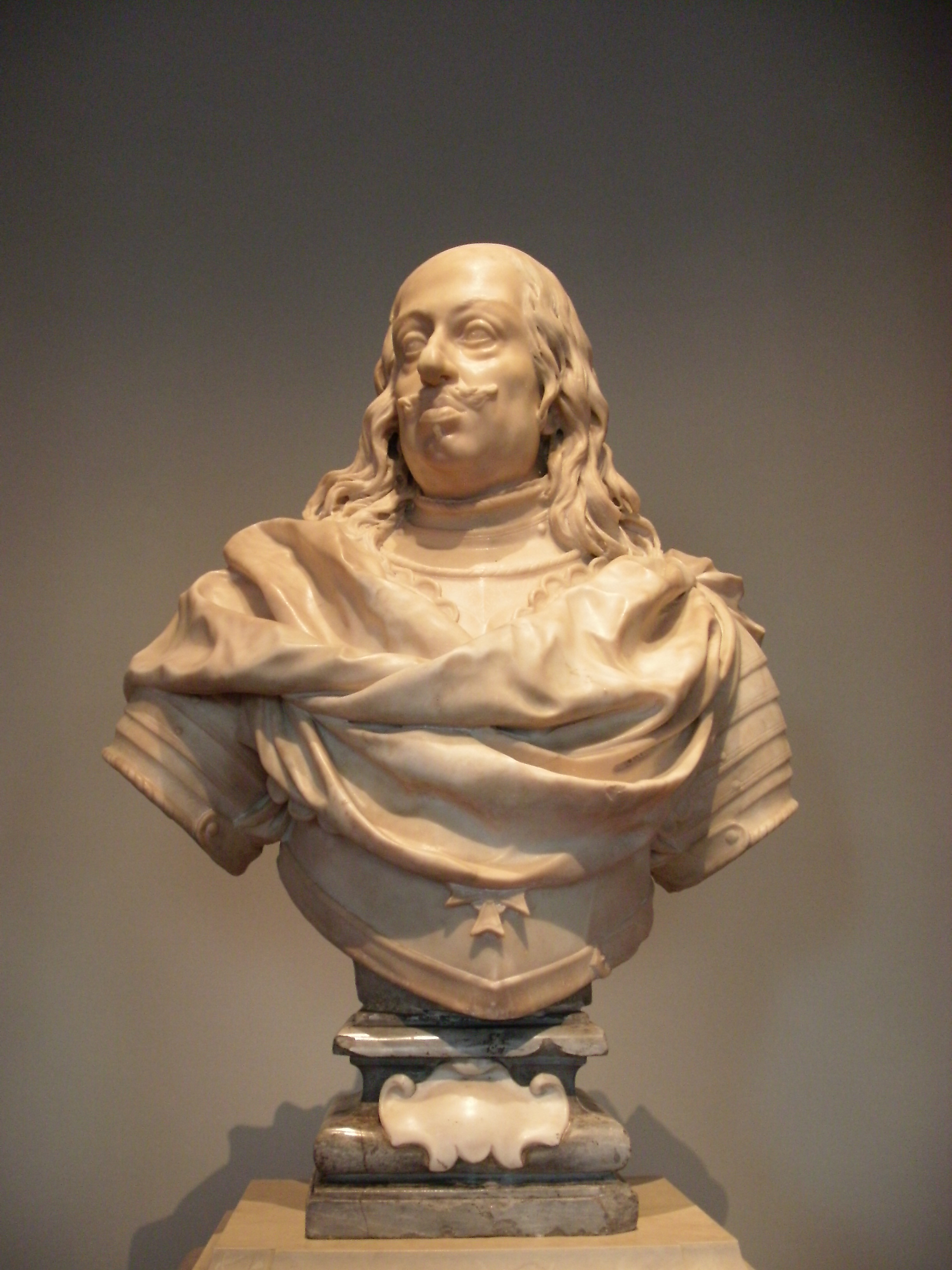
Ferdinando II de' Medici, Grand Duke of Tuscany - 1690 - National Gallery of Art, Washington, DC

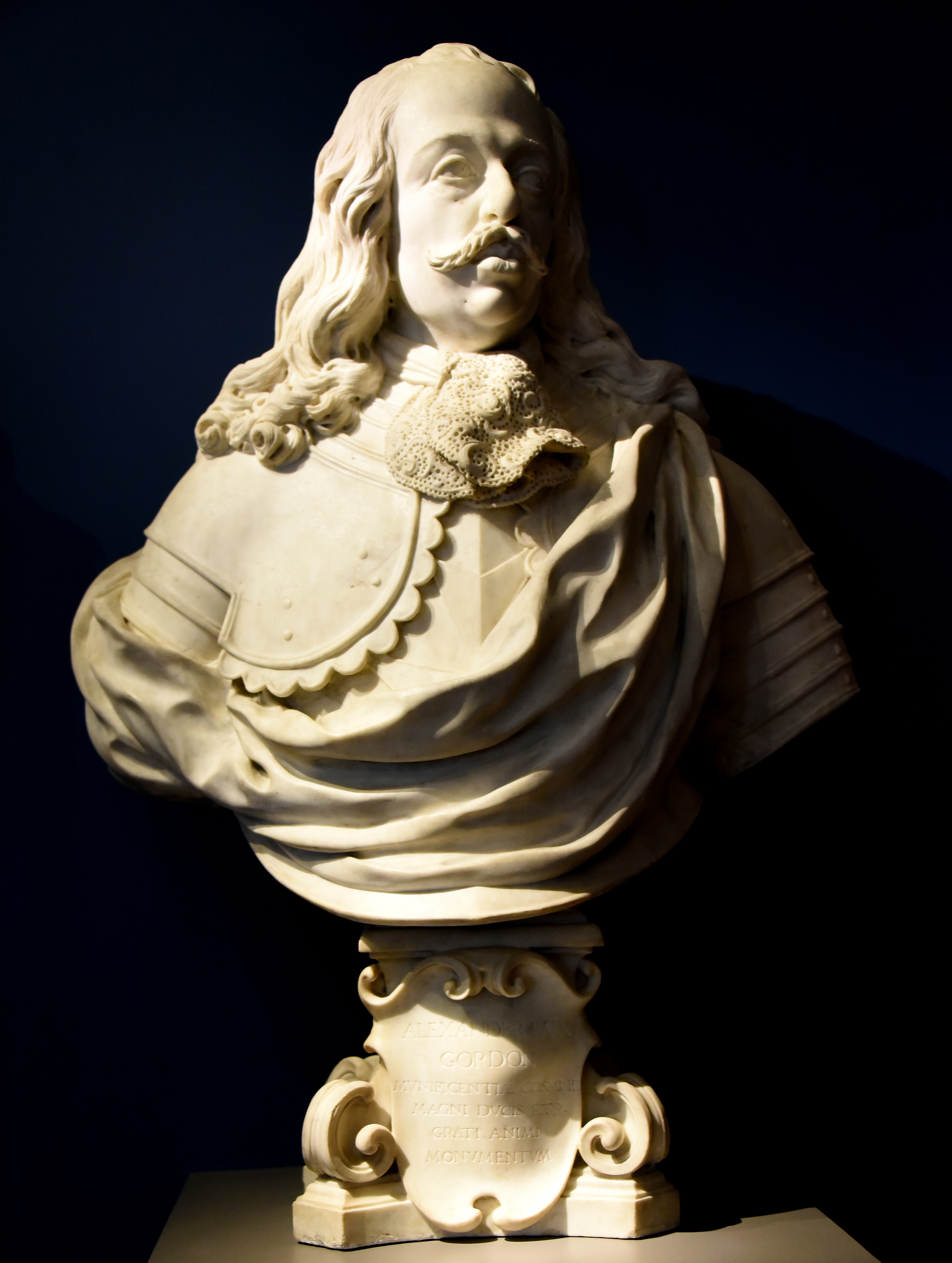
Bust of Cosimo III de' Medici, 1717-1718 CE. By Giovanni Battista Figgini. Marble, from Italy, Florence. The Victoria and Albert Museum, London

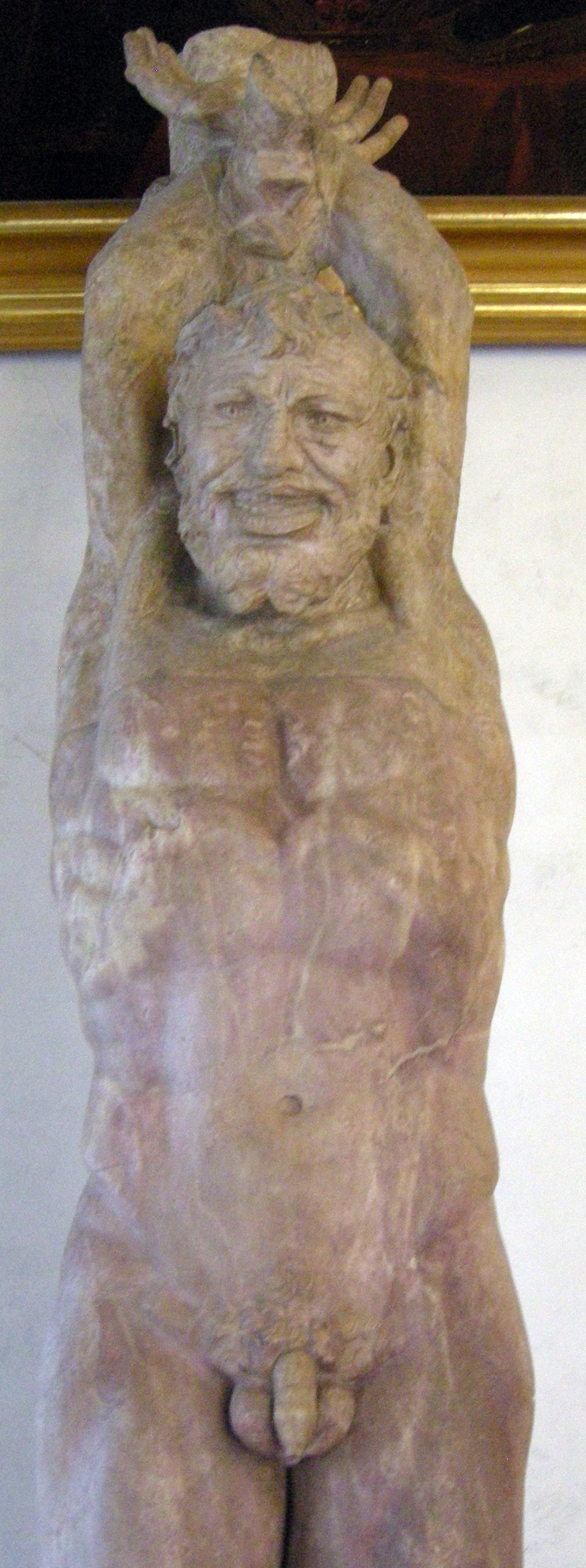
Red Marsyas, Florence, Uffizi

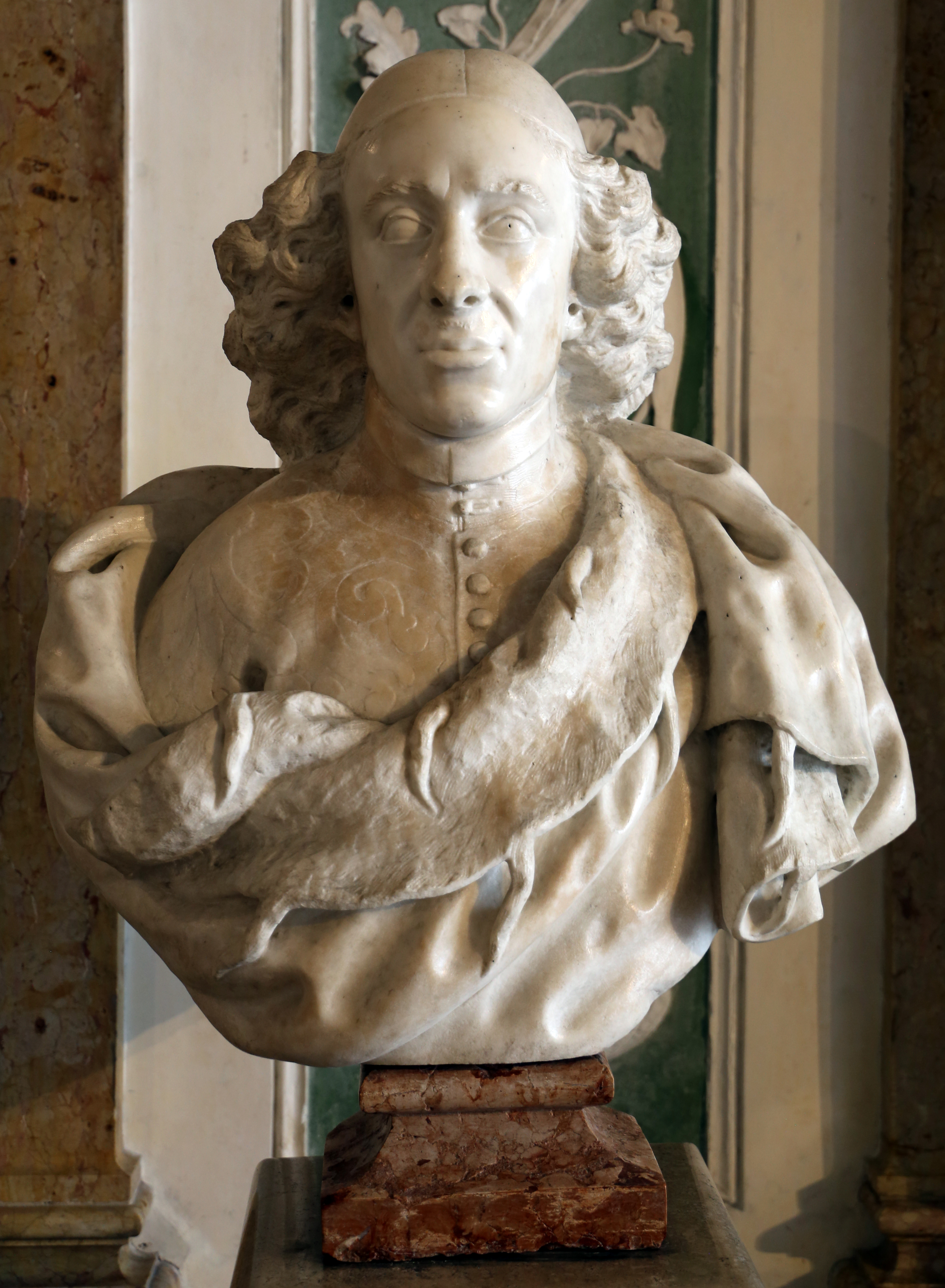
Bust of Paolo Querini, Pinacoteca Querini Stampalia, Venice

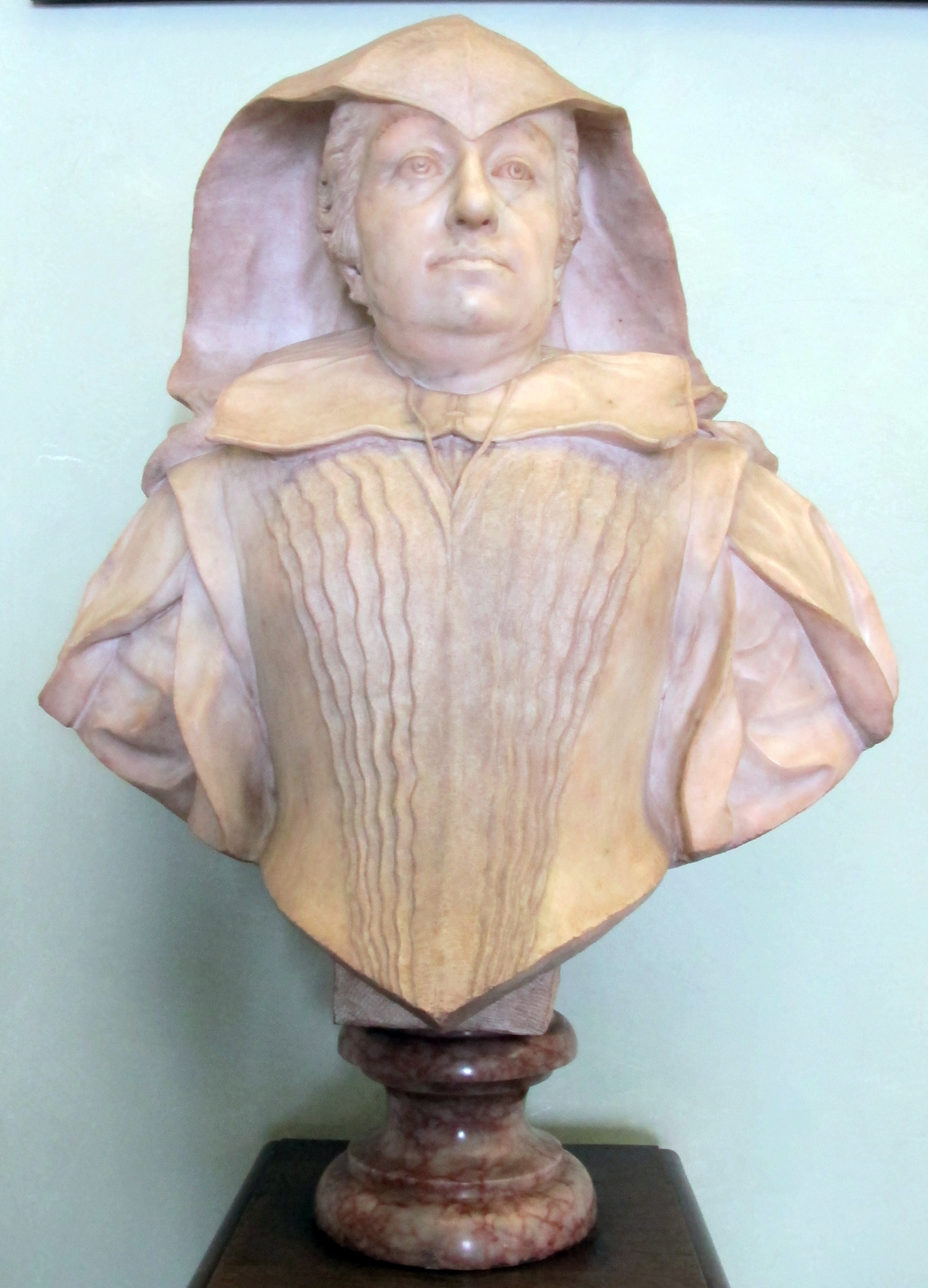
Bust of the Archduchess Maria Maddalena of Austria, Florence, Uffizi

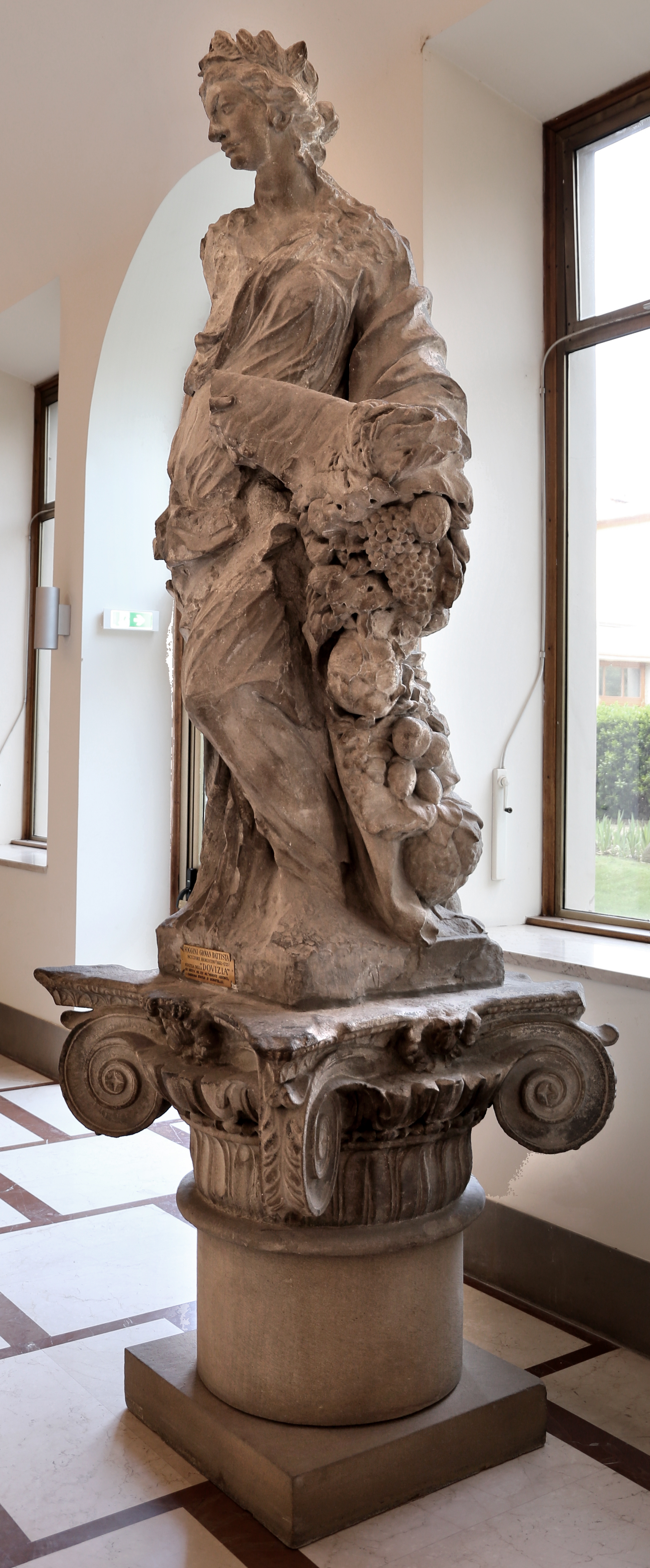
Allegory of Abundance, Collections of the Cassa di Risparmio di Firenze

The Massacre of the Niobids, c. 1674, Museum of the Opificio delle Pietre Dure, Florence

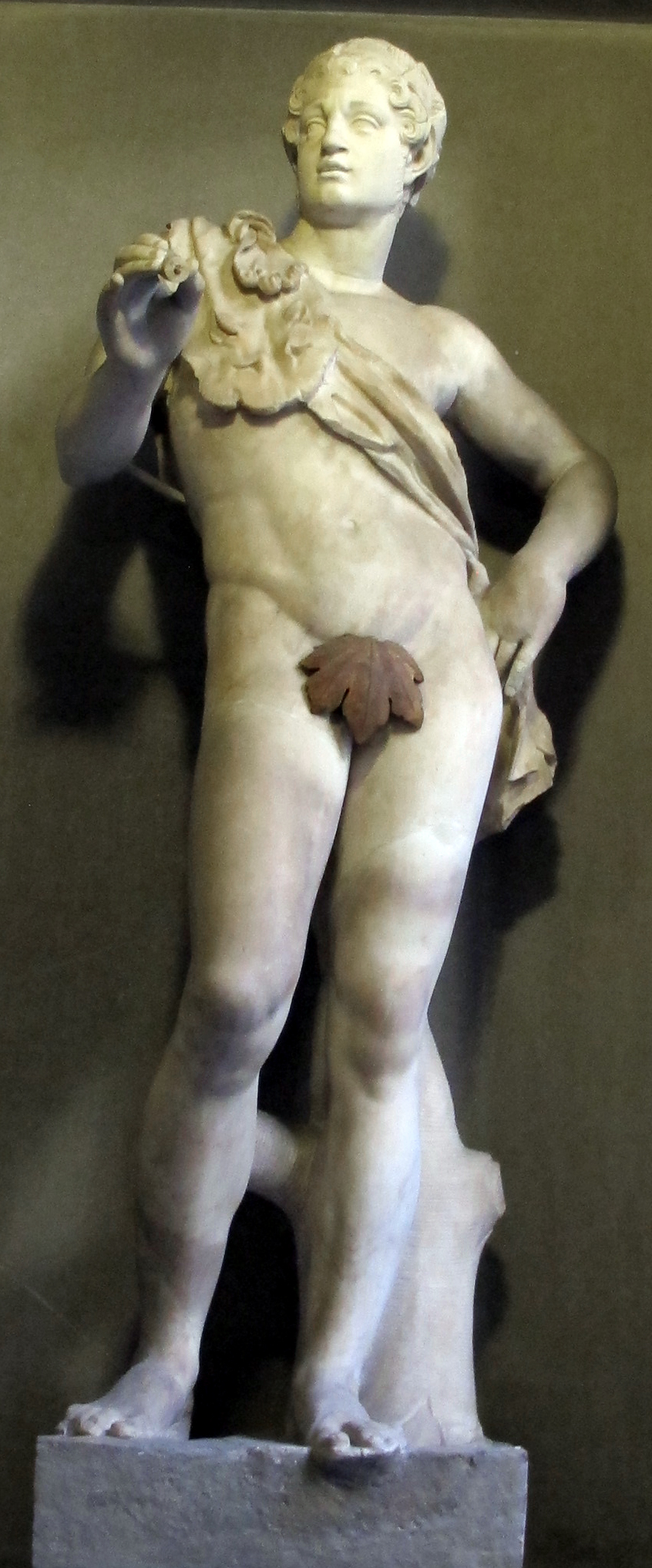
Satyr, Palazzo Medici Riccardi, Florence

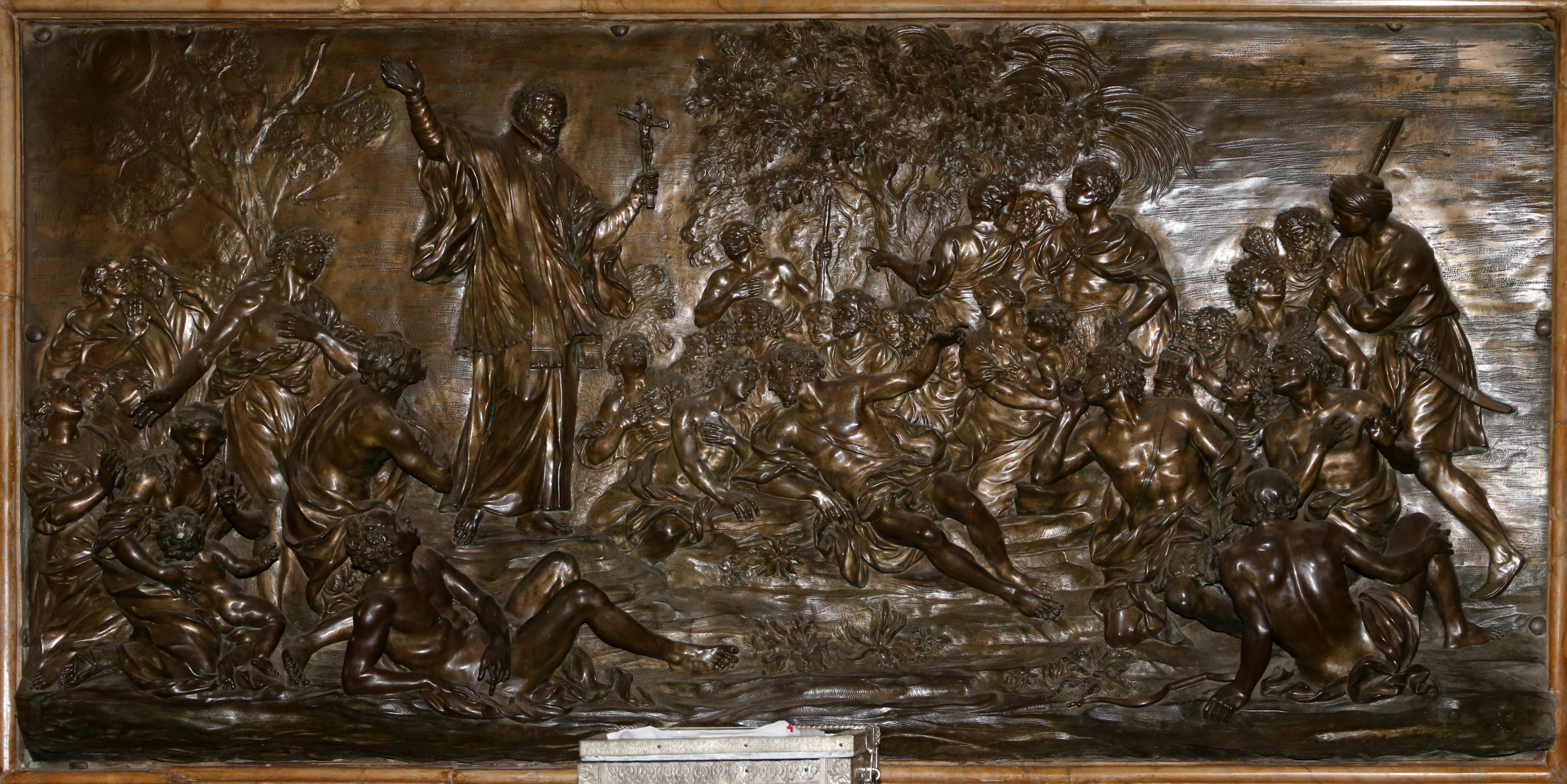
Bronze reliefs of Francis Xavier's shrine, Basilica of Bom Jesus, Old Goa

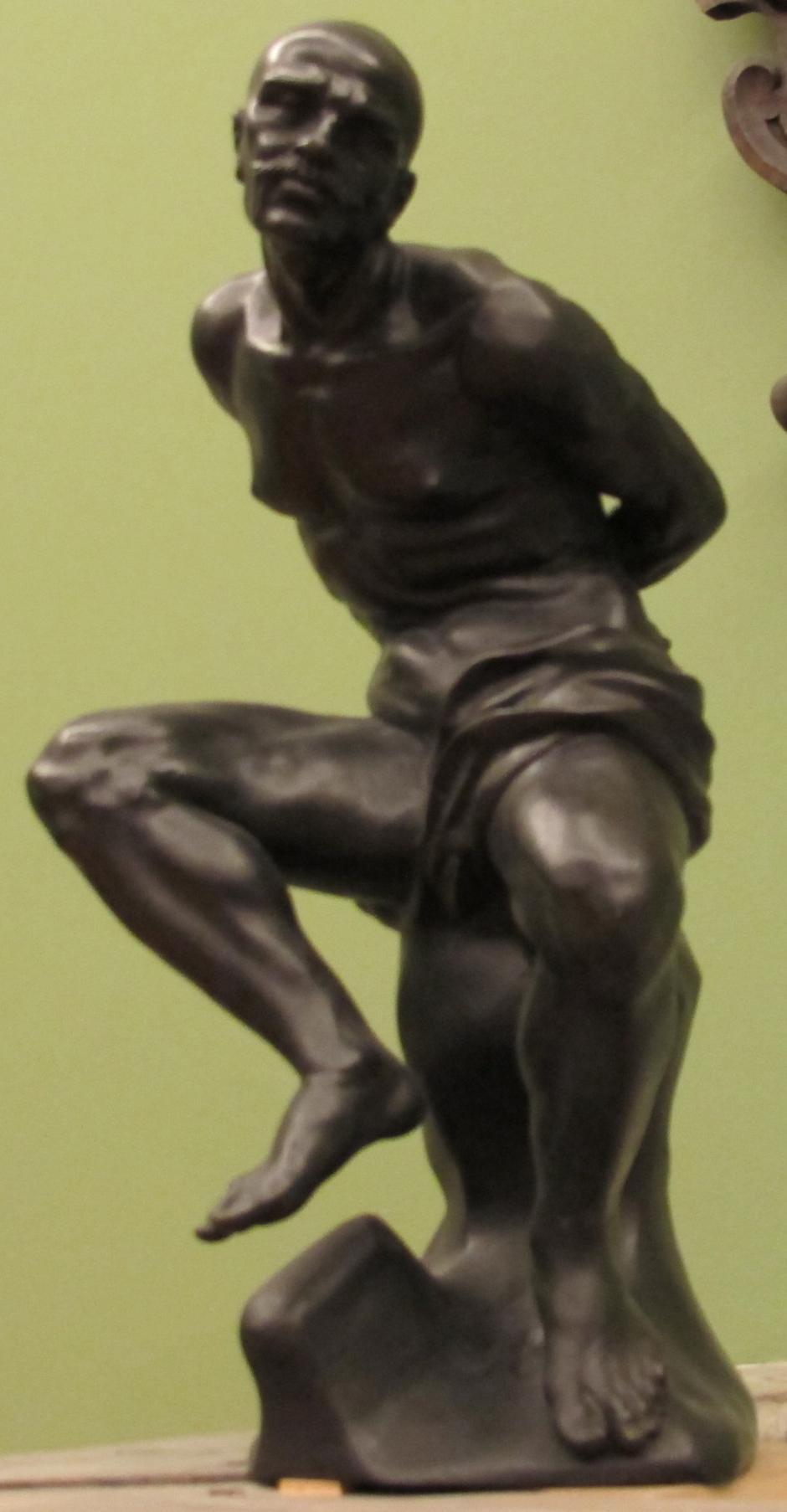
Chained captive, Asia by Foggini

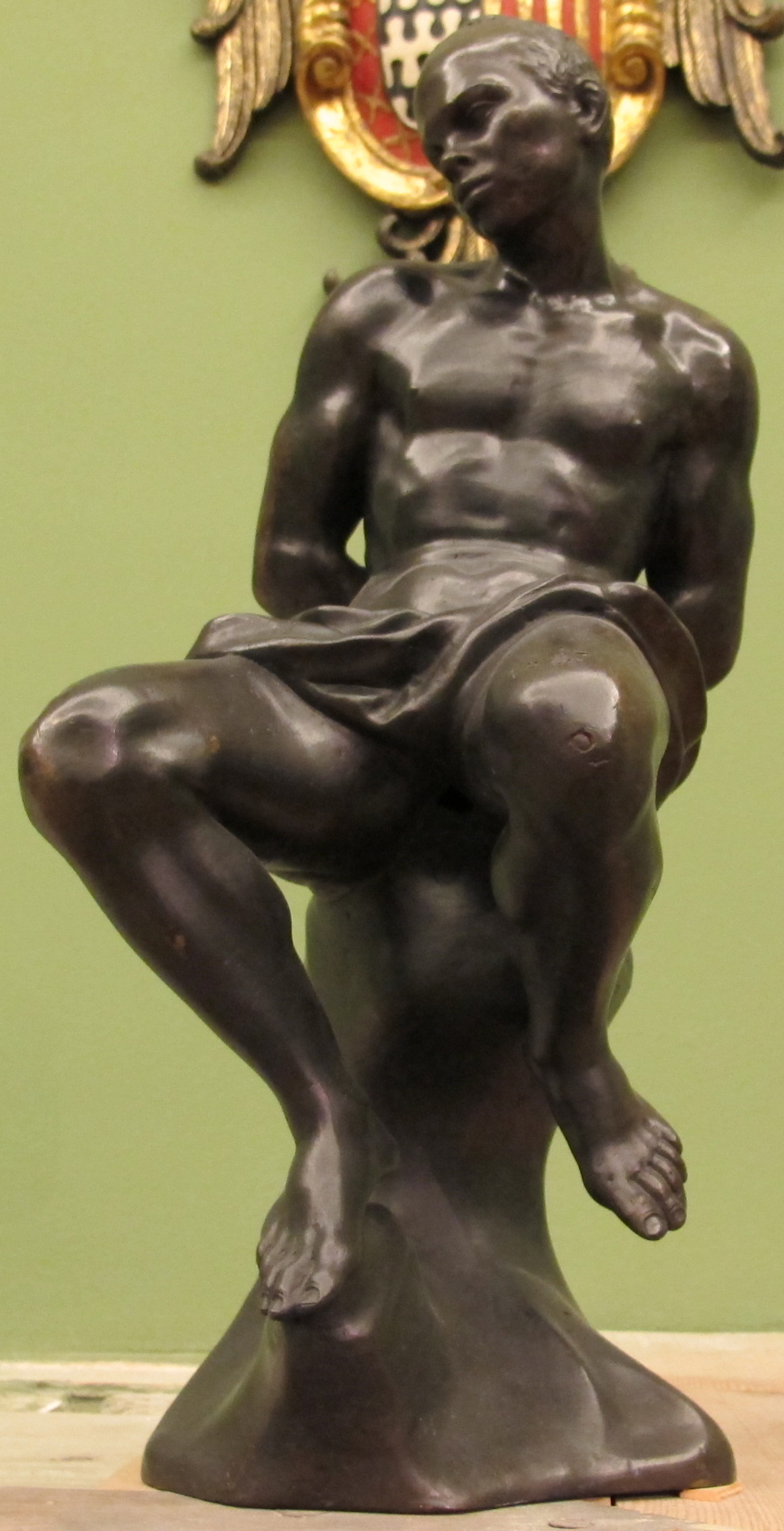
Chained captive, Africa by Foggini

== Bibliography ==
- Wittkower, Rudolf (1993). "Art and Architecture Italy, 1600-1750". Pelican History of Art. 1980. Penguin Books.
- Boucher, Bruce (1998). Thames & Hudson, World of Art (ed.). Italian Baroque Sculpture. pp. 164–66, 188–89.
- Gli Ultimi Medici, Review by Peter Cannon-Brookes, in The Burlington Magazine, 1974, pp. 777-80.
