= Siege of Chandax =

Successful Byzantine siege of Muslim Crete

Coordinates: 35°20′19″N 25°07′59″E

- Part of the Arab–Byzantine wars
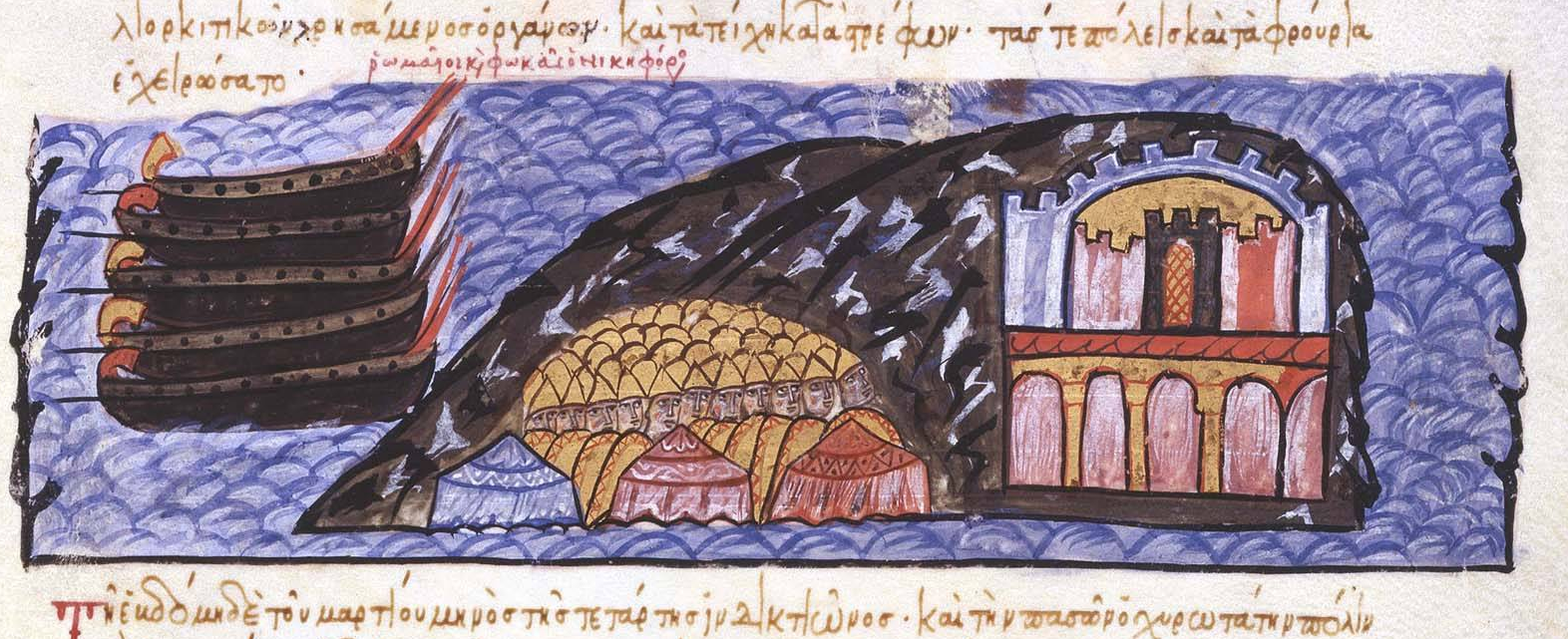
- Depiction of the siege of Chandax from the history of John Skylitzes
Date	960 – 6 March 961
Location	Chandax, Crete
Result	Byzantine victory
Territorial changes	Crete reconquered by Byzantium

Belligerents
Emirate of Crete	Byzantine Empire

Commanders and leaders
Abd al-Aziz ibn Shu'ayb (POW) an-Nu'man ibn Abd al-Aziz (POW)	Nikephoros Phokas; Nikephoros Pastilas †

Strength
Garrison of Chandax; Relief force: ~40,000 men (Leo the Deacon)	Unknown, possibly ~34,000 men

The siege of Chandax in 960–961 was the centerpiece of the Byzantine Empire's campaign to recover the island of Crete which since the 820s had been ruled by Muslim Arabs. The campaign followed a series of failed attempts to reclaim the island from the Muslims stretching as far back as 827, only a few years after the initial conquest of the island by the Arabs, and was led by the general and future emperor Nikephoros Phokas. It lasted from autumn 960 until spring 961, when the main Muslim fortress and capital of the island, Chandax (modern Heraklion) was captured. The reconquest of Crete was a major achievement for the Byzantines, as it restored Byzantine control over the Aegean littoral and diminished the threat of Saracen pirates, for which Crete had provided a base of operations.

== Crete under Muslim rule ==
The island of Crete had been conquered in the late 820s by a large group of exiles from Muslim Spain. In the years after the initial landing, the Byzantine Empire launched repeated expeditions to drive them back and recover the island, but these were defeated. The Saracens established their stronghold of Chandax on the northern coast, which became the capital of the new Emirate of Crete. The Muslim occupation of Crete had devastating consequences for Byzantium, as it opened up its naval heartland, the Aegean Sea, to raids from the Muslim fleets, both by the Cretan Saracens themselves, as well as those of the Levant, that used Crete as a forward base or a stop-over, as seen during Leo of Tripoli's sack of Thessalonica in 904, when many of the over 20,000 Thessalonian captives were sold or gifted as slaves in Crete.

The first major attempt by the Byzantines to reclaim the island was in 842–843, under Theoktistos. It made some headway, and apparently allowed for the re-establishment of the recovered parts of the island as a theme, as evidenced by the presence of a strategos of Crete in the contemporary Taktikon Uspensky. However Theoktistos had to abandon the campaign, and the troops left behind were quickly defeated by the Saracens. In the spring of 866, the regent Bardas intended to launch a campaign to recover Crete, but was assassinated on the eve of its departure. Further Byzantine attempts at reconquest in 911 (177 ships under the admiral Himerios) and 949 (128 ships under Constantine Gongyles) failed disastrously, despite the large resources and forces mustered. According to Christos Makrypoulias, despite their often meticulous preparation, the Byzantine expeditions against Crete failed due to supply constraints and the strategy of attrition followed by the Cretan Saracens. Success or failure in controlling Crete ultimately relied on control of Chandax, which left the Byzantines in the precarious position of having to maintain a siege for longer periods far from their supply bases. Secure behind the ramparts of Chandax, the Saracens could wait until their opponents had become weakened enough to launch a devastating counterattack.

Determined to avenge the disaster of 949, towards the end of his reign Emperor Constantine VII Porphyrogennetos (r. 913–919, 945–959) renewed preparations for capturing the island. Following his death in 959, the task fell upon his son and successor, Romanos II (r. 959–963). With the support and urging of his chief minister, Joseph Bringas, Romanos pushed on and appointed the Domestic of the Schools of the East, Nikephoros Phokas, a capable soldier and a distinguished veteran of the wars against the Muslims in eastern Asia Minor, as the commander-in-chief of the expedition. Phokas mobilized the Byzantine army of Asia Minor, and assembled a large force south of Ephesus. This expedition was far larger than previous ones, chiefly due to the relative internal stability brought on by recent victories on the eastern frontiers and a longstanding peace with the Bulgarians. According to Leo the Deacon, the fleet comprised many dromons equipped with Greek fire.

== Historical sources ==
Modern scholars rely primarily on three near-contemporary sources for the events surrounding the Byzantine reconquest of Crete: the history of Leo the Deacon, the poem The Capture of Crete of Theodosios the Deacon, and the continuation to the chronicle of Symeon the Logothete. The otherwise unknown Theodosios the Deacon wrote his poem in 961/962, as a panegyric to the recapture of the island, and presented it to Nikephoros Phokas shortly before his ascent to the imperial throne in 963. Leo the Deacon, who was born c. 950, completed his history after 992, and is a major Byzantine source on the period 959–975, including many anecdotes and eyewitness accounts. Although soon forgotten among the Byzantines themselves, it served as a source for later historians like John Skylitzes and John Zonaras. The first two chapters of Leo's work deal with the reconquest of Crete. Symeon the Logothetes wrote during Nikephoros Phokas' reign (963–969), and is sometimes identified with Symeon the Metaphrast, or with another Symeon who held a succession of offices under Phokas and John I Tzimiskes (r. 969–976). His work reaches until 948, and the continuation, possibly written by Symeon himself, reaches to 963. It does not survive in its original form, but in two variants: one as the sixth and last book of the Theophanes Continuatus, that deals with the reign of Constantine VII and Romanos II up to the spring of 961, and a summarized version up to 962 as part of the chronicle of Pseudo-Symeon. However, as the historian Anthony Kaldellis points out, a large part of the account of Symeon, which is heavily relied on by modern scholarship, is lifted, often almost verbatim, from the similar account by Procopius of Caesarea on the expedition of Belisarius against the Vandalic Kingdom.

== Landing in Crete and first clashes ==
Using ramps, the expeditionary force swiftly disembarked in good order. Theophanes Continuatus and Theodosios the Deacon report that the Byzantines faced no resistance at disembarkation, but Leo the Deacon reports that the Saracens were awaiting the Byzantine landing arrayed for battle. Nikephoros quickly mustered his troops in the typical Byzantine battle formation in three sections, and charged the Saracen army. The Saracens broke under the Byzantine attack, and turned to flee in the fortifications of Chandax, suffering many casualties. Leo the Deacon describes the city as being strongly fortified both by nature and by artifice:

For on one side it had the sea as a sure defense, and on the other side it was set on a nearly flat and level rock, on which the walls were laid, and its construction was something new and unusual. For it was built of earth, and goat and pig hair, mixed together and compressed thoroughly; and it was wide enough so that two wagons could easily make a circuit on top of the ramparts and pass each other, and it was quite high, and in addition two extremely wide and deep moats were dug around it.

— Leo the Deacon, History, I.5

From Leo and Theodosios' account it appears that Nikephoros initially hoped to capture Chandax by storm, but when this failed, he settled for a long-term siege, constructing a fortified encampment in front of Chandax, and placing his fleet in a secure anchorage nearby with orders to blockade the city and destroy any ships that might try to leave it. According to Leo, Phokas then instructed Nikephoros Pastilas, the strategos of the Thracesian Theme and a distinguished veteran of the wars against the Arabs in the east, to take a "cohort of picked men" and undertake a raid into the Cretan countryside to scout out the situation and gather supplies. Access to the interior would reduce the quantity of provisions that needed to be brought in by sea, which would become a problem later in the campaign. Perceiving the countryside to be relatively safe, Pastilas and his men roamed carelessly, indulging on food and wine. The Muslims, who were carefully hidden and observed their progress from the heights, saw this as an excellent opportunity, and assembled for battle. Leo maintains that although drunk, the Byzantines put up a good fight, until Pastilas himself, after being wounded by many arrows, fell. Then the Byzantines' discipline collapsed, and they were cut down, with only a few men surviving to report of the disaster to Phokas.

== Siege of Chandax ==
After hearing of the news of his slaughtered battalion, Phokas resolved to move quickly and establish a firm siege of the city. He inspected the city wall and found it to be extremely strong. As a result, he ordered his men to begin constructing a circumvallation from coast to coast in front of the landward side of the city wall. However, Pastilas' misfortune also demonstrated to Phokas that he would have to secure his rear before focusing on the siege. He selected a small group of younger soldiers, and led them out of the camp at night in secret. The Byzantines took a few prisoners, from whom they learned that a relief force, according to Leo some 40,000 men, were assembling on a nearby hill to attack the Byzantine encampment. Phokas allowed his men to rest during the next day, and only set off again when evening had fallen, guided by locals (probably native Christians). Quickly and quietly, his men surrounded the Arab encampment. Phokas then ordered the trumpets blown and charged the sleeping Arabs. Taken by surprise, the Arabs gave no thought to resisting, but tried to flee, only to run into other Byzantine troops.

The Arab relief army was annihilated, and Phokas instructed his men to cut off the heads of the fallen and take them with them as they returned to their base, again moving only during the night. On the next day, he had his men impale some of the heads in view of the city wall, and hurled others with catapults into the city itself. The sight caused great consternation and lamentation among the inhabitants, who saw their kin and friends dead; but they remained determined to resist, and threw back an attack led by Phokas soon after. Phokas employed archers and throwing machines against the defenders while attempting to scale the wall using ladders. The fortress held, however, under the pressure of the bombardments, and the ladders were crushed. Phokas soon called off the assault. He now decided to blockade the city for the winter while his engineers began to design and construct more significant siege engines.

It was around this point that the Emir of Crete, Abd al-Aziz, appealed to many of his fellow Muslim rulers for aid. Their envoys first went to the Ikhshidid ruler of Egypt, Unujur ibn al-Ikhshid, but he showed little inclination to come to their aid. As a result, the Cretans turned to the Fatimid caliph al-Mu'izz li-Din Allah, although he was a heterodox and bitter rival of the Cretans' nominal suzerain, the Abbasid caliph. For al-Mu'izz, this was a golden opportunity to portray himself as the true champion of jihad in the eyes of the Islamic world. He wrote letters to Romanos demanding that his forces leave Crete, otherwise the truce signed between them in 958 would be ended; and to Unujur suggesting a common effort against the Byzantines by uniting their fleets on 20 May 961 at Tolmeita in the Cyrenaica. Even if the Ikhshidid fleet did not come, declared al-Mu'izz, he would sail alone to aid Crete. In the event, nothing came of this as the Byzantines conquered Chandax even before the Fatimid fleet was made ready to sail.

The second assault on Chandax took place in March 961. This time the Byzantines used much more effective siege machines against Chandax, but they were still unable to gain a foothold in the city. Meanwhile, the Muslims kept just out of range of the Greek archers so that they could still attend the walls but not be annihilated by the bombardment. Phokas soon employed the use of a battering ram on the walls, but this was a feint. While the Muslims were focusing on the battering ram, miners dug underneath the walls and planted explosive and flammable materials underneath the weak points. Soon, they managed to destroy a huge section of the wall, where the Byzantine army began to pour into the city. The defenders quickly formed a line within the city, but it was too late. On 6 March, the Muslims were routed and fled back into the streets. The soldiers were allowed the traditional three days of plunder before the army again set off.

== Aftermath ==
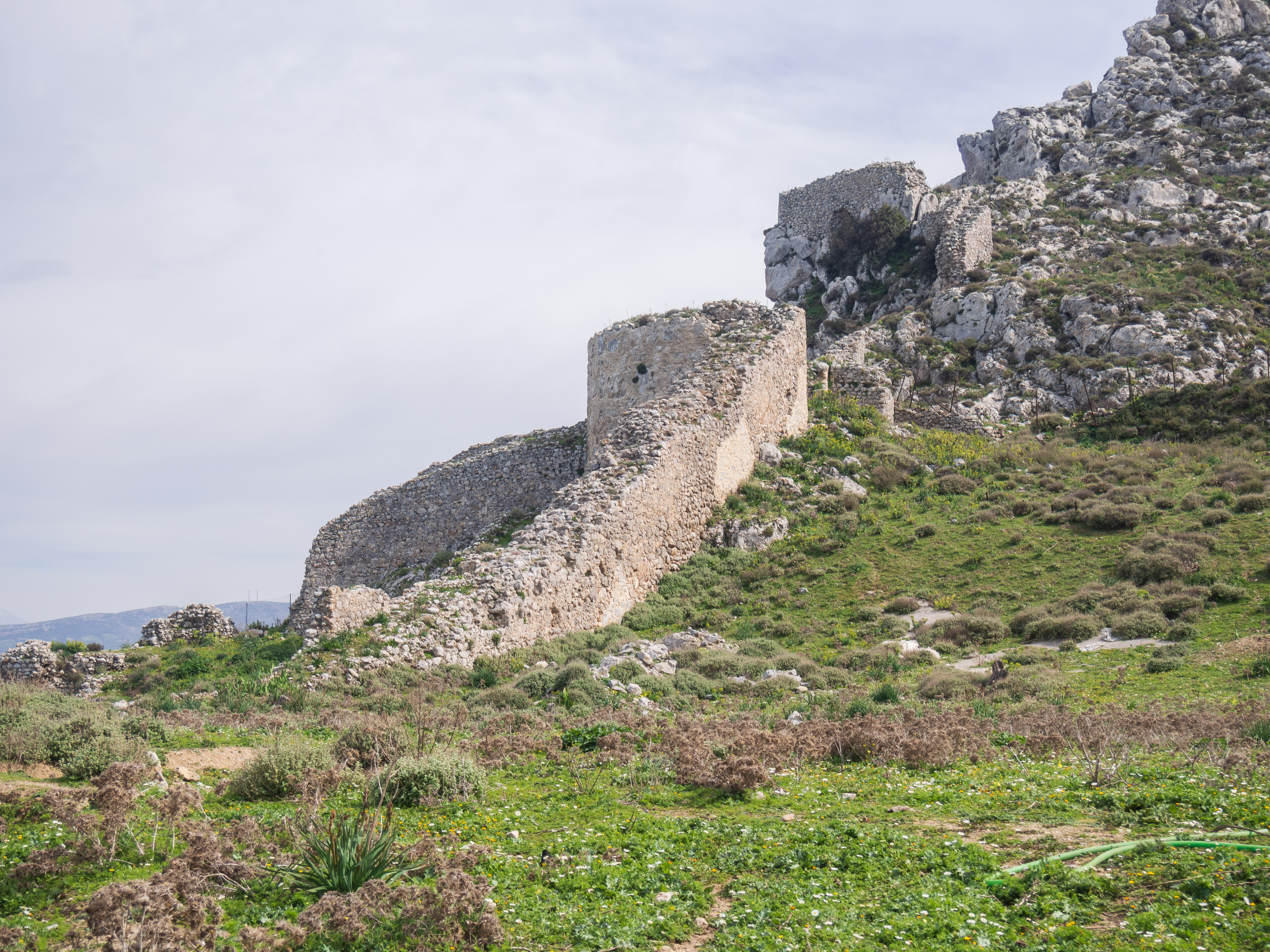
Temenos fortress was built by Nikephoros Phocas after the conquest in the interior of the island

With the capture of Chandax, the rest of Crete quickly capitulated to the Byzantine army, and the island was brought back under the suzerainty of Constantinople, and a long-term effort was made by Byzantium to re-Christianize the island. The island was organized as a regular theme, with a strategos based at Chandax. Extensive efforts at conversion of the populace were undertaken, led by John Xenos and Nikon "the Metanoeite". Lying on the southern entry of the Aegean Sea, the conquest of Crete was especially beneficial to the Byzantines due to its strategic position for the purpose of launching raids onto the coast of North Africa.

On the other hand, the commitment of so many Byzantine forces to Crete and the East left the way open for the Fatimids' own designs on the Byzantine possessions in the west: Fatimid forces proceeded to capture Taormina, the chief Byzantine fortress on Sicily, followed by a long siege of Rometta, the last Byzantine stronghold in the Val Demone. Nikephoros Phokas, who became emperor in 963, sent a huge relief expedition to the island in 964, including many veterans of the conquest of Crete. However, the Byzantines were defeated before Rometta and their fleet destroyed, signalling the completion of the Muslim conquest of Sicily.

In a much-distorted form, the events of the Siege of Chandax, and especially the figure of Nikephoros Phokas, who allegedly sent his son to govern the island, figure prominently in later traditions about the Byzantine period that circulated in Crete among the local Greek inhabitants during the period of Venetian rule.

== Sources ==
- Canard, M. (1971). "Iḳrīṭis̲h̲". In Lewis, B.; Ménage, V. L.; Pellat, Ch. & Schacht, J. (eds.). The Encyclopaedia of Islam, Second Edition. Volume III: H–Iram. Leiden: E. J. Brill. pp. 1082–1086. OCLC 495469525.
- Christides, Vassilios (1981). "The Raids of the Moslems of Crete in the Aegean Sea: Piracy and Conquest". Byzantion. 51: 76–111.
- Christides, Vassilios (1984). The Conquest of Crete by the Arabs (ca. 824): A Turning Point in the Struggle between Byzantium and Islam. Academy of Athens. OCLC 14344967.
- Detorakis, Theocharis E. (1986). Ιστορία της Κρήτης (in Greek). Athens.
- Halm, Heinz (1991). Das Reich des Mahdi: Der Aufstieg der Fatimiden [The Empire of the Mahdi: The Rise of the Fatimids] (in German). Munich: C. H. Beck. ISBN 3-406-35497-1.
- Kaldellis, Anthony (2015). "The Byzantine conquest of Crete (961 AD), Prokopios' Vandal War, and the Continuator of the Chronicle of Symeon". Byzantine and Modern Greek Studies. 39 (2): 302–311. doi:10.1017/S0307013100015408.
- Kaldellis, Anthony (2017). Streams of Gold, Rivers of Blood: The Rise and Fall of Byzantium, 955 A.D. to the First Crusade. Oxford University Press. ISBN 978-0190253226.
- Kazhdan, Alexander, ed. (1991). The Oxford Dictionary of Byzantium. Oxford and New York: Oxford University Press. ISBN 0-19-504652-8.
- Krumbacher, Karl (1897). Geschichte der byzantinischen Literatur von Justinian bis zum Ende des oströmischen Reiches (527-1453) (in German) (Second ed.). Munich: C.H. Beck'sche Verlagsbuchhandlung.
- Makrypoulias, Christos G. (2000). "Byzantine Expeditions against the Emirate of Crete c. 825–949". Graeco-Arabica (7–8): 347–362.
- Maltezou, Chryssa (1998). "Byzantine Legends in Venetian Crete". In Ševcenko, Ihor; Hutter, Irmgard (eds.). ᾿Αετός. Studies in honour of Cyril Mango presented to him on April 14, 1998. Stuttgart and Leipzig: B. G. Teubner. pp. 233–242. doi:10.1515/9783110958614.233.
- McMahon, Lucas (2021). "Logistical modelling of a sea-borne expedition in the Mediterranean: the case of the Byzantine invasion of Crete in AD 960". Mediterranean Historical Review. 36 (1): 63–94. doi:10.1080/09518967.2021.1900171. S2CID 235676141.
- Romane, Julian (2015). Byzantium Triumphant. Pen and Sword Books. ISBN 978-1473845701.
- Schlumberger, Gustave (1890). Un empereur byzantin au dixième siècle, Nicéphore Phocas (in French). Paris: Librairie de Firmin-Didot et Cie.
- Talbot, Alice-Mary; Sullivan, Dennis F., eds. (2005). The History of Leo the Deacon: Byzantine Military Expansion in the Tenth Century. Washington, DC: Dumbarton Oaks. ISBN 978-0-88402-324-1.
- Takirtakoglou, Konstantinos A. (2015). "Οι πόλεμοι μεταξύ του Νικηφόρου Φωκά και των Αράβων". Byzantina Symmeikta. 25: 57–114. doi:10.12681/byzsym.1121.
- Tougher, Shaun (1997). The Reign of Leo VI (886–912): Politics and People. Leiden: Brill. ISBN 978-90-04-10811-0.
- Treadgold, Warren (1997). A History of the Byzantine State and Society. Stanford, California: Stanford University Press. ISBN 0-8047-2630-2.
- Wortley, John, ed. (2010). John Skylitzes: A Synopsis of Byzantine History, 811–1057. Cambridge: Cambridge University Press. ISBN 978-0-521-76705-7.
