= Ali ibn Yusuf ibn Umar =

Sixth Emir of Crete from c. 915 to 925

Ali ibn Yusuf ibn Umar (Arabic: علي بن يوسف بن عمر) was the sixth emir of Crete, reigning from c. 915–925.

The surviving records on the internal history and rulers of the Emirate of Crete are very fragmentary. He is tentatively identified as a son of the fifth emir, Yusuf, and the great-grandson of the conqueror of Crete and founder of the emirate, Abu Hafs Umar. He is believed to have reigned from c. 915 to c. 925, succeeding his father.

He is probably the unnamed emir of Crete mentioned in a story about the abduction of a number of prisoners from Nauplion by Cretan pirates c. 920; the bishop Peter of Argos prayed for their deliverance, and an Imperial galley caught the pirates, immobilized them with Greek fire, and returned the captives to their homes. His name is only attested through coinage.

He was succeeded by his uncle, Ahmad ibn Umar.

== Sources ==
- Canard, M. (1971). "Iḳrīṭis̲h̲". In Lewis, B.; Ménage, V. L.; Pellat, Ch. & Schacht, J. (eds.). The Encyclopaedia of Islam, Second Edition. Volume III: H–Iram. Leiden: E. J. Brill. pp. 1082–1086. OCLC 495469525.
- Lilie, Ralph-Johannes; Ludwig, Claudia; Pratsch, Thomas; Zielke, Beate (2013). Prosopographie der mittelbyzantinischen Zeit Online. Berlin-Brandenburgische Akademie der Wissenschaften. Nach Vorarbeiten F. Winkelmanns erstellt (in German). Berlin and Boston: De Gruyter.
- Miles, George C. (1964). "Byzantium and the Arabs: Relations in Crete and the Aegean Area". Dumbarton Oaks Papers. 18: 1–32. doi:10.2307/1291204. JSTOR 1291204.

Preceded by Yusuf ibn Umar ibn Shu'ayb	Emir of Crete c. 915–925	Succeeded by Ahmad ibn Umar
