= Abu Abdallah Umar ibn Shu'ayb =

Third Emir of Crete from c. 880 to 895

Abū ʿAbdallāh ʿUmar II ibn Shuʿayb al-Balluti, also Babdel (Greek: Βαβδέλ) in the Byzantine sources, was the third Emir of Crete, ruling c. 880–895.

The surviving records on the internal history and rulers of the Emirate of Crete are very fragmentary. Following the studies of George C. Miles with the aid of numismatic evidence, he is tentatively identified as a son of the second emir, Shu'ayb, and the grandson of the conqueror of Crete and founder of the Emirate of Crete, Abu Hafs Umar. His reign is placed from c. 880 to c. 895. According to the Byzantine chronicler Genesios, sometime in the reign of the Byzantine emperor Leo VI the Wise (r. 886–912) he suffered a shipwreck off the coast of the Peloponnese, and was taken captive by the local governor, Constantine Tessarakontapechys.

He was apparently succeeded by his brother Muhammad ibn Shu'ayb al-Zarkun, but two of his sons, Yusuf and Ahmad, are held to have reigned later, in c. 910–915 and c. 925–940 respectively. According to a letter sent by the Patriarch of Constantinople, Nicholas I Mystikos, to Umar's son Yusuf, Umar had maintained a friendly correspondence with the Patriarch Photios.

== Sources ==
- Canard, M. (1971). "Iḳrīṭis̲h̲". In Lewis, B.; Ménage, V. L.; Pellat, Ch. & Schacht, J. (eds.). The Encyclopaedia of Islam, Second Edition. Volume III: H–Iram. Leiden: E. J. Brill. pp. 1082–1086. OCLC 495469525.
- Lilie, Ralph-Johannes; Ludwig, Claudia; Pratsch, Thomas; Zielke, Beate (2013). Prosopographie der mittelbyzantinischen Zeit Online. Berlin-Brandenburgische Akademie der Wissenschaften. Nach Vorarbeiten F. Winkelmanns erstellt (in German). Berlin and Boston: De Gruyter.
- Miles, George C. (1964). "Byzantium and the Arabs: Relations in Crete and the Aegean Area". Dumbarton Oaks Papers. 18: 1–32. doi:10.2307/1291204. JSTOR 1291204.

Preceded by Shu'ayb ibn Umar	Emir of Crete c. 880 – c. 895	Succeeded by Muhammad ibn Shu'ayb al-Zarkun
