= Muhammad ibn Shu'ayb al-Zarkun =

Fourth Emir of Crete from c. 895 to c. 910

Muhammad ibn Shu'ayb al-Zarkun al-Balluti, known as Zerkounes (Greek: Ζερκουνῆς) in the Byzantine sources, was the fourth Emir of Crete.

The surviving records on the internal history and rulers of the Emirate of Crete are very fragmentary. He is tentatively identified as a son of the second emir, Shu'ayb, and the grandson of the conqueror of Crete and founder of the emirate, Abu Hafs Umar. He is believed to have reigned from c. 895 to c. 910, succeeding his brother Umar.

== Sources ==
- Canard, M. (1971). "Iḳrīṭis̲h̲". In Lewis, B.; Ménage, V. L.; Pellat, Ch. & Schacht, J. (eds.). The Encyclopaedia of Islam, Second Edition. Volume III: H–Iram. Leiden: E. J. Brill. pp. 1082–1086. OCLC 495469525.
- Lilie, Ralph-Johannes; Ludwig, Claudia; Pratsch, Thomas; Zielke, Beate (2013). Prosopographie der mittelbyzantinischen Zeit Online. Berlin-Brandenburgische Akademie der Wissenschaften. Nach Vorarbeiten F. Winkelmanns erstellt (in German). Berlin and Boston: De Gruyter.
- Miles, George C. (1964). "Byzantium and the Arabs: Relations in Crete and the Aegean Area". Dumbarton Oaks Papers. 18: 1–32. doi:10.2307/1291204. JSTOR 1291204.

Preceded by Umar II ibn Shu'ayb	Emir of Crete ca. 895–910	Succeeded by Yusuf ibn Umar
