= Yusuf ibn Umar ibn Shu'ayb =

Fifth Emir of Crete from c. 910 to c. 915

Yusuf ibn Umar ibn Shu'ayb (Arabic: يوسف بن عمر بن شعيب) was the fifth Emir of Crete, reigning from c. 910–915.

The surviving records on the internal history and rulers of the Emirate of Crete are very fragmentary. He is tentatively identified as a son of the third emir, Abu Abdallah Umar (II), and the grandson of the conqueror of Crete and founder of the emirate, Abu Hafs Umar. He is believed to have reigned from c. 910 to c. 915, succeeding his uncle, Muhammad.

In 909/10, the unnamed author of the hagiography of Theoktiste of Lesbos was sent to Crete as an envoy to ascertain whether the local Arabs would make common cause with the Abbasid fleets operating from Syria. In 911, the Byzantines launched a large-scale expedition, with over 100 ships and 43,000 men, to recapture the island, but were driven off. On its return journey, the Byzantine fleet was destroyed in an ambush off Chios by the Syrian fleet. Yusuf is presumably the unnamed Emir of Crete addressed in a letter by Patriarch Nicholas I Mystikos in 913/14.

He was succeeded by his son, Ali.

== Sources ==
- Canard, M. (1971). "Iḳrīṭis̲h̲". In Lewis, B.; Ménage, V. L.; Pellat, Ch. & Schacht, J. (eds.). The Encyclopaedia of Islam, Second Edition. Volume III: H–Iram. Leiden: E. J. Brill. pp. 1082–1086. OCLC 495469525.
- Lilie, Ralph-Johannes; Ludwig, Claudia; Pratsch, Thomas; Zielke, Beate (2013). Prosopographie der mittelbyzantinischen Zeit Online. Berlin-Brandenburgische Akademie der Wissenschaften. Nach Vorarbeiten F. Winkelmanns erstellt (in German). Berlin and Boston: De Gruyter.
- Miles, George C. (1964). "Byzantium and the Arabs: Relations in Crete and the Aegean Area". Dumbarton Oaks Papers. 18: 1–32. doi:10.2307/1291204. JSTOR 1291204.
- Treadgold, Warren (1997). A History of the Byzantine State and Society. Stanford, California: Stanford University Press. ISBN 0-8047-2630-2.

Preceded by Muhammad ibn Shu'ayb al-Zarkun	Emir of Crete c. 910–915	Succeeded by Ali ibn Yusuf
