= Pier Francesco Foggini =

Italian writer

Reverend Pier Francesco Foggini DTh
- Pier Francesco Foggini, medal by Giovanni Zanobi Weber, Florence, Palazzo Martelli
- Born: 2 April 1713; Florence, Grand Duchy of Tuscany
- Died: 31 May 1783 (aged 70); Rome, Papal States
- Resting place: San Giovanni dei Fiorentini
- Occupations: Catholic priest; librarian; archaeologist; theologian
- Known for: Editio princeps of the Fasti Praenestini
- Father: Giovanni Battista Foggini

Academic background
- Education: University of Pisa
- Doctoral advisor: Luigi Guido Grandi

Academic work
- Era: Age of Enlightenment
- Discipline: Classical scholar, Classical archaeologist
- Institutions: Vatican Library

Pier Francesco Foggini or Pietro Francesco Foggini (2 April 1713 – 31 May 1783) was an Italian Catholic priest, philologist and archaeologist.

== Biography ==
The son of the sculptor Giovanni Battista Foggini, Pier Francesco Foggini was born in Florence on 2 April 1713. Ordained at the age of twelve, he studied theology at the University of Pisa under Luigi Guido Grandi, obtaining his doctorate in 1735.

In 1741, Foggini published his first two major works in Florence: De primis Florentinorum Apostolis, a historical-theological treatise concerning the early Christianisation of Tuscany; and P. Vergili Maronis Codex antiquissimus, a diplomatic edition of Virgil's works. Foggini's edition of Virgil it is the oldest complete facsimile of an ancient manuscript. It faithfully reproduces the 5th-century Codex Mediceus, one of the earliest and most complete surviving manuscripts of Virgil's Aeneid, Eclogues, and Georgics. To mimic the original handwriting, the printer utilized specially cut fonts that imitated ancient rustic capital letters. The layout combined fonts of different sizes to flawlessly fit ancient annotations and emendations directly between the lines, mimicking the handwritten source.

In 1742, Foggini accepted an invitation from Giovanni Gaetano Bottari, the Vatican's second librarian, to come to Rome. There, Pope Benedict XIV appointed him to the Pontifical Academy of History and made him sub-librarian at the Vatican Library. In 1768, Foggini succeeded Bottari as second librarian. In 1770, the fragmentary Fasti Praenestini, one of the earliest surviving Roman calendars, were discovered in the Forum of the ancient Praeneste. Entrusted with the excavations, Foggini collected and arranged the calendar's scattered pieces, reconstructing the entire months of January, March, April, and December, and a small portion of February. He published the editio princeps of the Fasti in Rome in 1779.

Following the death of Stefano Evodio Assemani on 5 December 1782, Pope Pius VI appointed Foggini Prefect of the Vatican Library. Foggini died in Rome on 31 May 1783 and was buried in the church of San Giovanni dei Fiorentini. Foggini devoted much of his life to studying the Vatican's manuscripts and published editions of several late-ancient and early Byzantine works, including Epiphanius' De Gemmis (Rome, 1743) and Commentarium in Canticum Canticorum (Rome, 1750), and the works of George of Pisidia, Theodosius the Deacon and Corippus (Rome, 1777).

== Selected works ==
- De primis Florentinorum apostolis (Florence, 1740)
- De Romano divi Petri itinere et episcopatu, eiusque antiquissimis imaginibus. Exercitationes historico-criticae (Florence, 1741)
- P. Vergili Maronis codex antiquissimus a Rufio Turcio Aproniano distinctus et emendatus (Florence, 1741).
- S. Epiphanii Salaminis in Cypro episcopi de XII gemmis rationalis summi sacerdotis Hebraeorum liber ad Diodorum (Rome, 1743)
- S. Epiphanii Salaminis in Cypro episcopi Commentarium in canticum canticorum (Rome, 1743).
- S. Augustini De gratia Dei et libero arbitrio hominis et praedestinatione sanctorum opera selecta (Rome, 1754).
- Corporis Historiae Byzantinae Nova Appendix, Opera Georgii Pisidae, Theodosii Diaconi et Corippi Africani Grammatici Complectens (Rome, 1777).
- Fastorum anni Romani a Verrio Flacco ordinatorum reliquiae (Rome, 1779)

== Bibliography ==
- This article incorporates public domain material from McClintock, John; Strong, James (1867–1887). Cyclopædia of Biblical, Theological and Ecclesiastical Literature. Harper and Brothers.
- Ramsay, William (1875). "Fasti". In William Smith (ed.). A Dictionary of Greek and Roman Antiquities. London: John Murray. pp. 521‑523.
- Caffiero, Marina (1997). "FOGGINI, Pier Francesco". Dizionario Biografico degli Italiani (in Italian). Vol. 48: Filoni–Forghieri. Rome: Institute of the Italian Encyclopaedia. ISBN 978-88-12-00032-6.
