= Anemas (died 971) =

Anemas al-Nu'man ibn Abd al-Aziz
- Died: around 24 July 971; Dorostolon
- Father: Abd al-Aziz ibn Shu'ayb
- Religion: Chalcedonian Christianity prev. Sunni Islam

Al-Nu'mān ibn ʿAbd al-ʿAzīz ibn Shuʿayb ibn ʿUmar al-Qurṭubī, known by the Byzantines as Anemas (Greek: Ἀνεμᾶς), was the son of the last Emir of Crete, Abd al-Aziz ibn Shu'ayb. Following the Siege of Chandax and the reconquest of Crete by the Byzantines, Al-Nu'man and his father were taken as prisoners to Constantinople, where Al-Nu'man converted to Christianity, him and his father were displayed during the triumph of the conqueror and future emperor Nikephoros II Phokas.

Upon settling in Constantinople, Anemas converted to Christianity and joined the Byzantine army as a member of the imperial bodyguard.

When the emperor John I Tzimiskes campaigned against the Kievan Rus' in 971, Anemas joined the expedition and went on to fight in a number of engagements during the Siege of Dorostolon. According to Leo the Deacon, during a sally of the besieged Rus', Anemas personally engaged and killed their second-in-command, Ikmor. On the next day (Leo gives it as Friday the 24th of July, but the 24th was a Monday) the Rus' launched a determined all-out attack around sunset, hoping to break through. Anemas charged the Rus leader, Sviatoslav, and struck him on the neck, throwing him off his horse; his armour however saved Sviatoslav, and the Rus' quickly came to his aid and attacked Anemas. The latter was able to kill several, but in the end was killed himself. The Rus' then charged with renewed confidence, but were beaten back with heavy casualties, forcing Sviatoslav to capitulate and sign a treaty with Tzimiskes.

It is possible that the Anemas family that appears in the Byzantine aristocracy in the 11th–12th centuries were his descendants.

== Sources ==
- Kaldellis, Anthony (2017). Streams of Gold, Rivers of Blood: The Rise and Fall of Byzantium, 955 A.D. to the First Crusade. Oxford University Press. ISBN 978-0190253226.
- Lilie, Ralph-Johannes; Ludwig, Claudia; Pratsch, Thomas; Zielke, Beate (1998–2013). Prosopographie der mittelbyzantinischen Zeit (in German). Berlin and Boston: De Gruyter.
- Talbot, Alice-Mary; Sullivan, Dennis F., eds. (2005). The History of Leo the Deacon: Byzantine Military Expansion in the Tenth Century. Washington, DC: Dumbarton Oaks. ISBN 978-0-88402-324-1.
