= Anemas =

Byzantine aristocratic family

Anemas (Greek: Ἀνεμᾶς) was the name of a Byzantine aristocratic family, attested from the 9th to the 15th centuries.

The origin and etymology of the name are uncertain; it may be connected to anemos, "wind", although the philologist Phaedon Koukoules suggested a derivation to aneme, "spool". Others, such as François Chalandon, have suggested that the family attested in later times were descendants of Anemas, son of the last Emir of Crete, who converted to Christianity and joined the Byzantine army.

Four Anemas brothers took part in a conspiracy against Alexios I Komnenos in 1105; two of them are known by name, Michael and Leo. Once the attempt on the life of the emperor had been discovered and foiled, the conspirators were shaven and ritually humiliated. Michael Anemas was due to be punished by blinding, but his bravery moved the emperor's daughters who begged the intercession of their mother. The emperor was persuaded to grant clemency and Michael was merely imprisoned. The tower near the Blachernae Palace where he was incarcerated became known as the 'Prison of Anemas', because of his long residence there. The family retained a prominent position, however, during the Komnenian period: Manuel Anemas was chosen to marry a daughter of John II Komnenos, and other members appear to have made marriage alliances with the Angelos and Doukas families, who belonged to the highest Byzantine aristocracy. The family declined after the late 12th century, but members occur until the end of the empire in the 15th century. An Anemas, landowner in Stomion of Chalcidice, is attested in 1321, an unnamed member of the family drowned in the Marmara Sea in the early 14th century, while a Theodore Anemas was chartophylax at Imbros in 1407.

== Sources ==
- Comnena, Anna (1969) [Written around 1148], The Alexiad, translated by Sewter, E. R. A., Penguin Classics
- Kazhdan, Alexander, ed. (1991). The Oxford Dictionary of Byzantium. Oxford and New York: Oxford University Press. ISBN 0-19-504652-8.
- Trapp, Erich; Beyer, Hans-Veit; Walther, Rainer; Sturm-Schnabl, Katja; Kislinger, Ewald; Leontiadis, Ioannis; Kaplaneres, Sokrates (1976–1996). Prosopographisches Lexikon der Palaiologenzeit (in German). Vienna: Verlag der Österreichischen Akademie der Wissenschaften. ISBN 3-7001-3003-1.
