= Ahmad ibn Umar =

Seventh Emir of Crete from 925 to 940

Ahmad ibn Umar ibn Shu'ayb (Arabic: أحمد بن عمر بن شعيب) was the seventh Emir of Crete, reigning from c. 925–940.

The surviving records on the internal history and rulers of the Emirate of Crete are very fragmented. He is tentatively identified as a son of the third emir, Abu Abdallah Umar, and as the great-grandson of the conqueror of Crete and founder of the emirate, Abu Hafs Umar. He is believed to have reigned from c. 925 to c. 940, succeeding his nephew, Ali ibn Yusuf ibn Umar.

During his reign, in the 930s, the Cretans heavily raided the Byzantine territories around the Aegean Sea: attacks are recorded in the Peloponnese, Central Greece, Mount Athos, and the western coast of Asia Minor. This new wave of raids led to the decision of the Byzantine emperor Constantine VII to launch another expedition to recapture Crete. This expedition did not sail until 949 and was a failure.

He was succeeded by his son, Shu'ayb.

== Sources ==
- Canard, M. (1971). "Iḳrīṭis̲h̲". In Lewis, B.; Ménage, V. L.; Pellat, Ch. & Schacht, J. (eds.). The Encyclopaedia of Islam, Second Edition. Volume III: H–Iram. Leiden: E. J. Brill. pp. 1082–1086. OCLC 495469525.
- Miles, George C. (1964). "Byzantium and the Arabs: Relations in Crete and the Aegean Area". Dumbarton Oaks Papers. 18: 1–32. doi:10.2307/1291204. JSTOR 1291204.

Preceded by Ali ibn Yusuf ibn Umar	Emir of Crete c. 925–940	Succeeded by Shu'ayb ibn Ahmad
