= Theodosius the Deacon =

10th century Byzantine poet

Theodosius the Deacon or Theodosios Diakonos (Greek: Θεοδόσιος ο Διάκονος) was a Byzantine poet who lived in the 10th century. He is known only through his The Capture of Crete (Greek: Ἅλωσις τῆς Κρήτης, in Latin: De Creta capta), an epic poem in 1039 twelve-syllable lines, written in 962/963 to celebrate the recapture of the island of Crete from the Arabs in 961 by Nikephoros Phokas.

== Sources ==
- Kazhdan, Alexander, ed. (1991), Oxford Dictionary of Byzantium, Oxford University Press, p. 2053, ISBN 978-0-19-504652-6
- Nicolaos Panayiotakis: Θεοδόσιος ο Διάκονος και το ποίημα αυτού "Άλωσις της Κρήτης". Ηράκλειο 1960.
- Theodosii Diaconi De Creta capta. Edidit Hugo Criscuolo. Teubner, Leipzig 1979.
- Andreas Külzer: Theodosios Diakonos, Autor (Mitte/Ende 10. Jh.)., Lexikon des Mittelalters, Bd. 8, 1997, S. 643.
- Beate Zielke: Theodosius the Deacon, Christian-Muslim Relations. A Bibliographical History. General Editor David Thomas. Brill Online, 2014
- F. Cornelius (Cornaro), Creta sacra, Venice 177, pp. 269-327
- Theodosius Diaconus, De Creta capta, ed. F. Jacobs, in Leonis diaconi Caloënsis Historia libri decem ed. C.B. Hase, Bonn, 1828, pp. 259-306
- Pietro Francesco Foggini (ed.), Historiae Byzantinae nova appendix opera Georgii Pisidae Theodosii Diaconi et Corippi Africani Grammatici complectens, Rome 1777, pp. 356-76
- Andriollo, Luisa. (2011). Il De Creta capta di Teodosio Diacono fra epos storico ed encomio imperiale. Rivista di Studi Bizantini e Neoellenici. 47. p. 31–56.
