= Emirate of Crete =

Muslim state in the eastern Mediterranean from 824-961

- 824/827–961
- Emirate of Crete c. 900
- Status: De facto independent, nominally under suzerainty of the Abbasid Caliphate
- Capital: Chandax
- Common languages: Arabic, Greek
- Religion: Sunni Islam Chalcedonian Christianity
- Government: Absolute Monarchy
- Emir
  - 820s – c. 855: Abu Hafs Umar I (first)
  - 949–961: Abd al-Aziz ibn Shu'ayb (last)
- Historical era: Middle Ages
  - Andalusian exiles land on the island: 824/827
  - Unsuccessful Byzantine Invasion under Theoktistos: 842–843
  - Siege of Chandax: 961
- Currency: Gold dinar, dirham
Preceded by	Succeeded by
Byzantine Crete	Byzantine Crete
- Today part of: Greece

The Emirate of Crete (Arabic: إقريطش, romanized: Iqrīṭish or إقريطية, Iqrīṭiya; Greek: Κρήτη, romanized: Krētē) was an Arab Islamic state that existed on the Mediterranean island of Crete from the late 820s to the reconquest of the island by the Byzantine Empire in 961. Although the emirate recognized the suzerainty of the Abbasid Caliphate and maintained close ties with Tulunid Egypt, it was de facto independent.

A group of Arab Andalusian exiles led by Abu Hafs Umar al-Iqritishi conquered Crete in either 824 or 827/828, and established an independent Islamic state. The Byzantines launched a campaign that took most of the island back in 842–43 under Theoktistos, but the reconquest was not completed and would soon be reversed. Later attempts by the Byzantine Empire to recover the island failed, and for the approximately 135 years of its existence, the emirate was one of the major foes of Byzantium. Crete commanded the sea lanes of the Eastern Mediterranean and functioned as a forward base and haven for Muslim corsair fleets that ravaged the Byzantine-controlled shores of the Aegean Sea. The emirate's internal history is less well known, but all accounts point to considerable prosperity deriving not only from piracy but also from extensive trade and agriculture. The emirate was brought to an end by Nikephoros Phokas, who successfully campaigned against it in 960–961, re-annexing the island to the Byzantine Empire.

== History ==
Crete had been raided by Muslim forces since the first wave of the Muslim conquests in the mid-7th century. It first experienced a raid in 654 and then another in 674/675, and parts of the island were temporarily occupied during the reign of the Umayyad Caliph al-Walid I (r. 705–715). However, the island at that time was not conquered and despite occasional raids in the 8th century, it remained securely in Byzantine hands; Crete was too far from the Arab naval bases in the Levant for an effective expedition to be undertaken against it.

=== Conquest of Crete ===
At some point in the second half of the reign of Byzantine Emperor Michael II (r. 820–829), a group of Andalusian exiles landed on Crete and began its conquest. These exiles had a long nomadic history. Traditionally they have been described as the survivors of a failed revolt against the emir al-Hakam I of Córdoba in 818. In the aftermath of the revolt's suppression, the citizens of the Córdoban suburb of al-Rabad were exiled en masse. Some settled in Fez in Morocco, but others, numbering over 10,000, took to piracy, probably joined by other Andalusians. They landed in Alexandria and took control of the city until 827, when they were besieged and expelled by the Abbasid general Abdullah ibn Tahir al-Khurasani. As W. Kubiak points out, however, the supposed origin from Córdoba is contradicted by other sources, which record the presence of Andalusian corsairs in Alexandria as early as 798/9, and their takeover is dated to 814, before the revolt took place; furthermore, the Andalusians' leader, Umar ibn Hafs ibn Shuayb ibn Isa al-Balluti, commonly known as Abu Hafs, came from a locality (Fahs al-Ballut, now Los Pedroches) that was far from Córdoba.

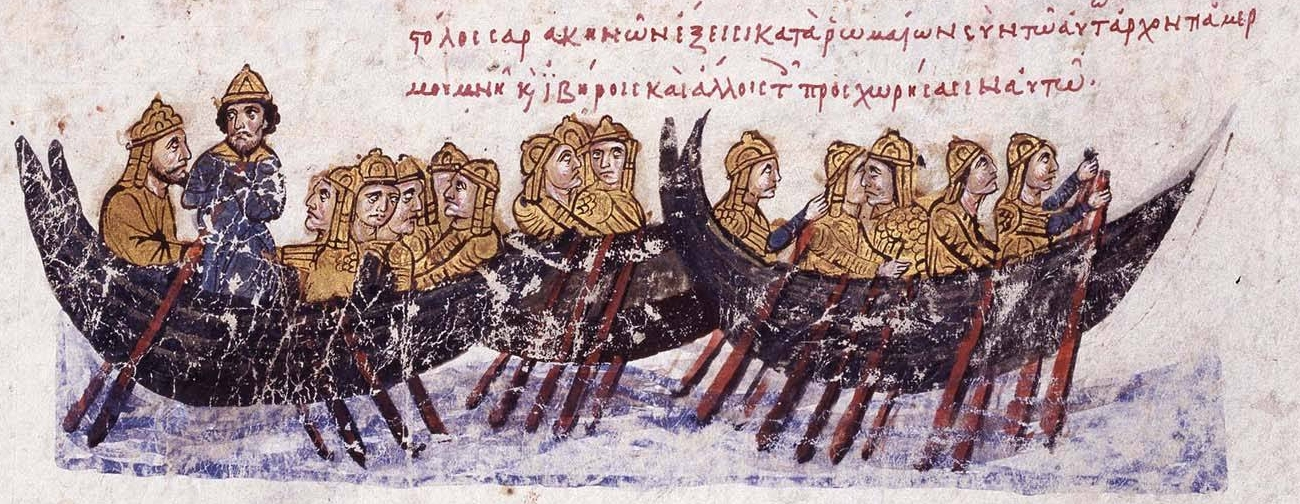
The Saracen fleet sails towards Crete. Miniature from the Madrid Skylitzes manuscript. A monk shows the Saracens where to build Chandax.

The exact chronology of the Andalusians' landing in Crete is uncertain. Following the Muslim sources, it is usually dated to 827 or 828, after the Andalusians' expulsion from Alexandria. Byzantine sources however seem to contradict this, placing their landing soon after the suppression of the large revolt of Thomas the Slav (821–823). Further considerations regarding the number and chronology of the Byzantine campaigns launched against the invaders and prosopographical questions of the Byzantine generals that headed them have led other scholars like Vassilios Christides and Christos Makrypoulias to propose an earlier date, c. 824. Under the terms of their agreement with Ibn Tahir, the Andalusians and their families left Alexandria in 40 ships. Historian Warren Treadgold estimates them at some 12,000 people, of whom about 3,000 would be fighting men. According to Byzantine historians, the Andalusians were already familiar with Crete, having raided it in the past. They also claim that the Muslim landing was initially intended as a raid, and was transformed into a bid for conquest when Abu Hafs himself set fire to their ships. However, as the Andalusian exiles had brought their families along, this is probably later invention. The Andalusians' landing-place is also unknown; some scholars think that it was at the north coast, at Suda Bay or near where their main city and fortress Chandax (Arabic: ربض الخندق, romanized: rabḍ al-kḫandaq, lit. 'Castle of the Moat', modern Heraklion) was later built, but others think that they most likely landed on the south coast of the island and then moved to the more densely populated interior and the northern coast.

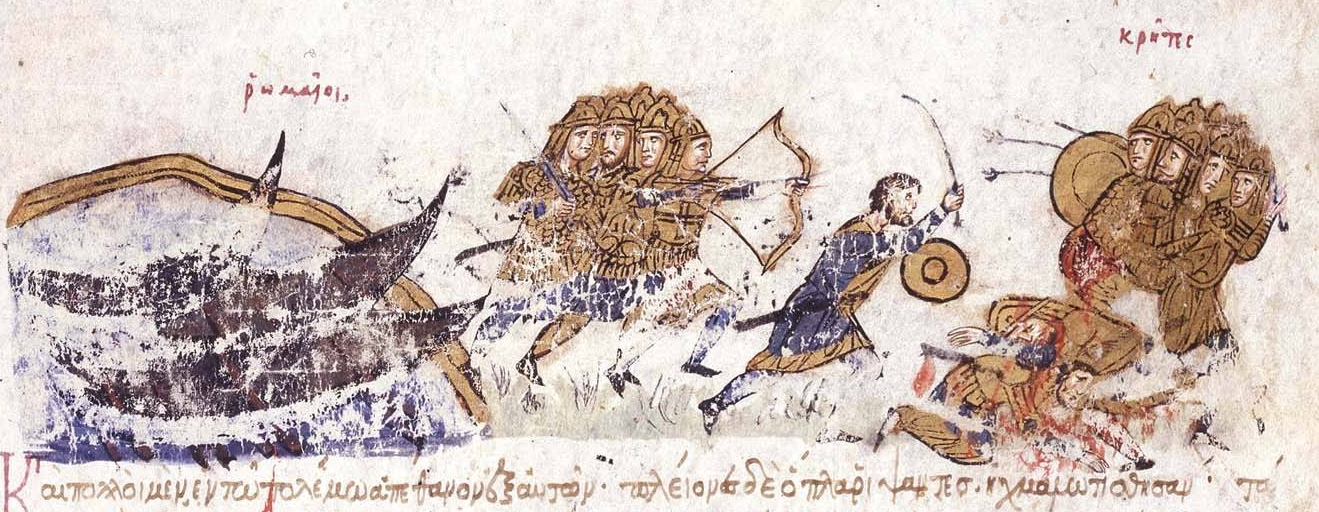
The Byzantines led by Krateros disembark and defeat the Cretan Saracens

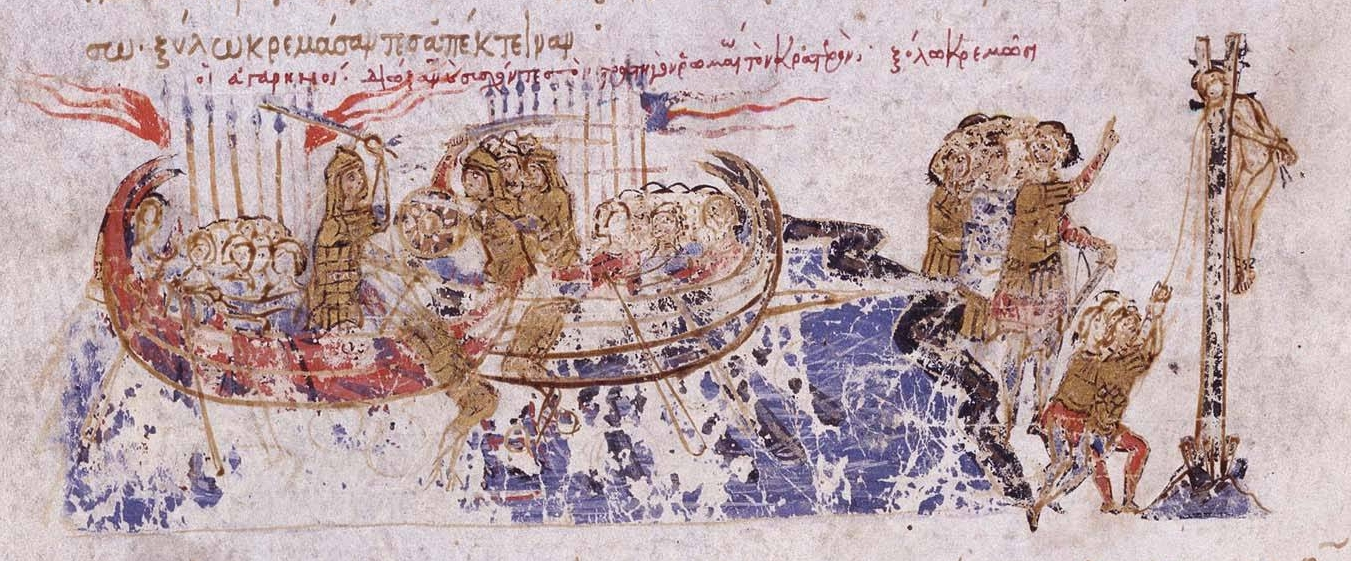
The Saracens chase and hang Krateros at Kos.

As soon as Emperor Michael II learned of the Arab landing, and before the Andalusians had secured their control over the entire island, he reacted and sent successive expeditions to recover the island. Losses suffered during the revolt of Thomas the Slav hampered Byzantium's ability to respond, however, and if the landing occurred in 827/828, the diversion of ships and men to counter the gradual conquest of Sicily by the Tunisian Aghlabids also interfered. The first expedition, under Photeinos, strategos of the Anatolic Theme, and Damian, Count of the Stable, was defeated in open battle, where Damian was killed. The next expedition was sent a year later and comprised 70 ships under the strategos of the Cibyrrhaeots Krateros. It was initially victorious, but the overconfident Byzantines were then routed in a night attack. Krateros managed to flee to Kos, but there he was captured by the Arabs and crucified. Makrypoulias suggests that these campaigns must have taken place before the Andalusians completed their construction of Chandax, where they transferred the capital from the inland site of Gortyn.

=== Pirate emirate ===
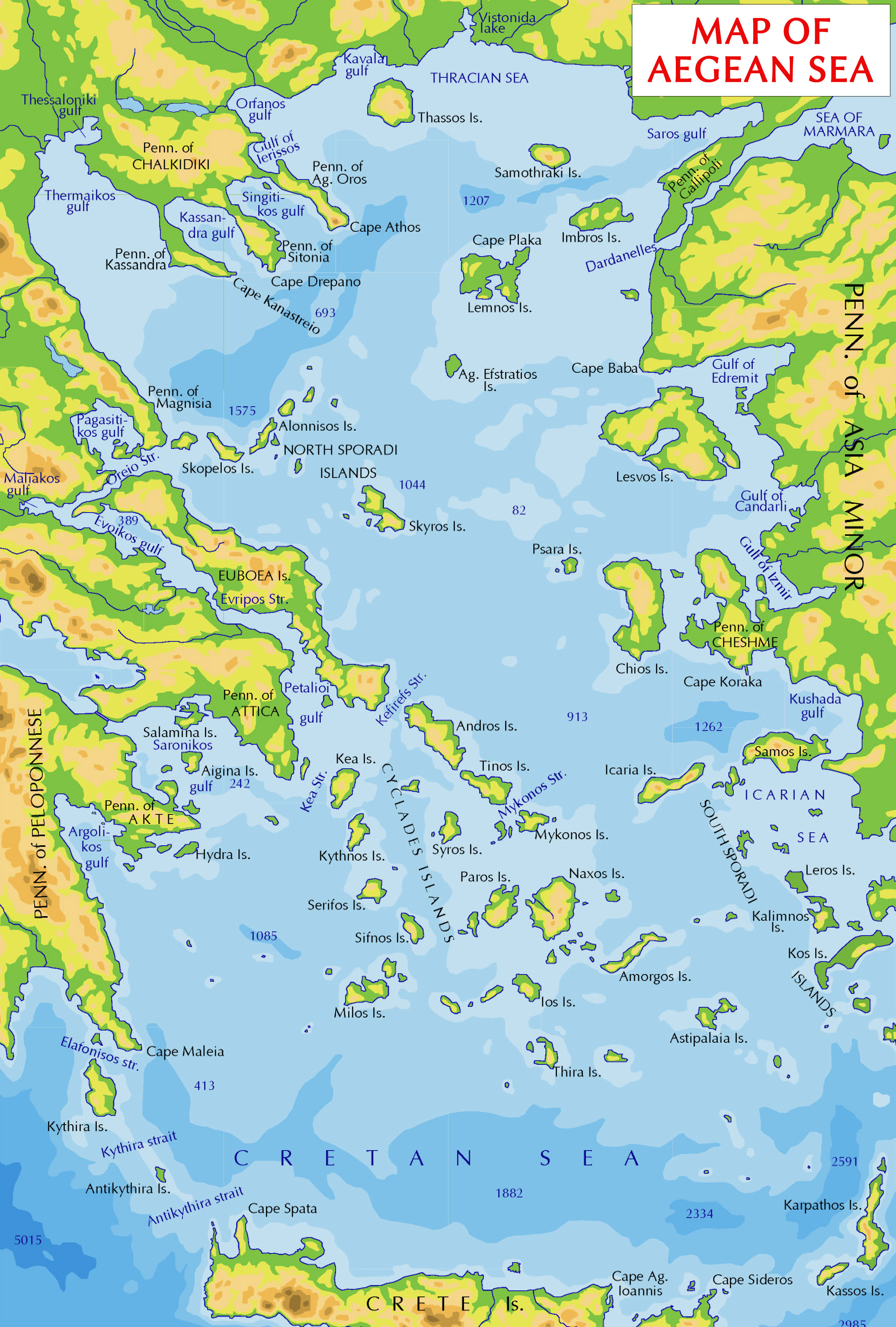
Map of the Aegean Sea, with Crete in the bottom

Abu Hafs repulsed the early Byzantine attacks and slowly consolidated control of the entire island. He recognized the suzerainty of the Abbasid Caliphate, but ruled as a de facto independent prince. The conquest of the island was of major importance as it transformed the naval balance of power in the Eastern Mediterranean and opened the hitherto secure Aegean Sea littoral to frequent and devastating raids.

The Andalusians also occupied several of the Cyclades during these early years, but Michael II organized another large-scale expedition, recruiting an entire new marine corps, the Tessarakontarioi, and building new ships. Under the admiral Ooryphas, this fleet managed to evict the Arabs from the Aegean islands but failed to retake Crete. Michael II's successor Theophilos (r. 829–842) sent an embassy to Abd ar-Rahman II of Córdoba proposing a joint action against the Andalusian exiles, but beyond Abd ar-Rahman giving his assent to any Byzantine action against Crete, this came to nothing. In October 829, those Arabs destroyed an imperial fleet off Thasos, undoing much of the work of Ooryphas and opening the Aegean and its coasts to pillage. Later they attacked Euboea (c. 835–840), Lesbos (837), and the coasts of the Thracesian Theme, where they destroyed the monastic centre of Mount Latros. They were heavily defeated, however, by the local strategos, Constantine Kontomytes.

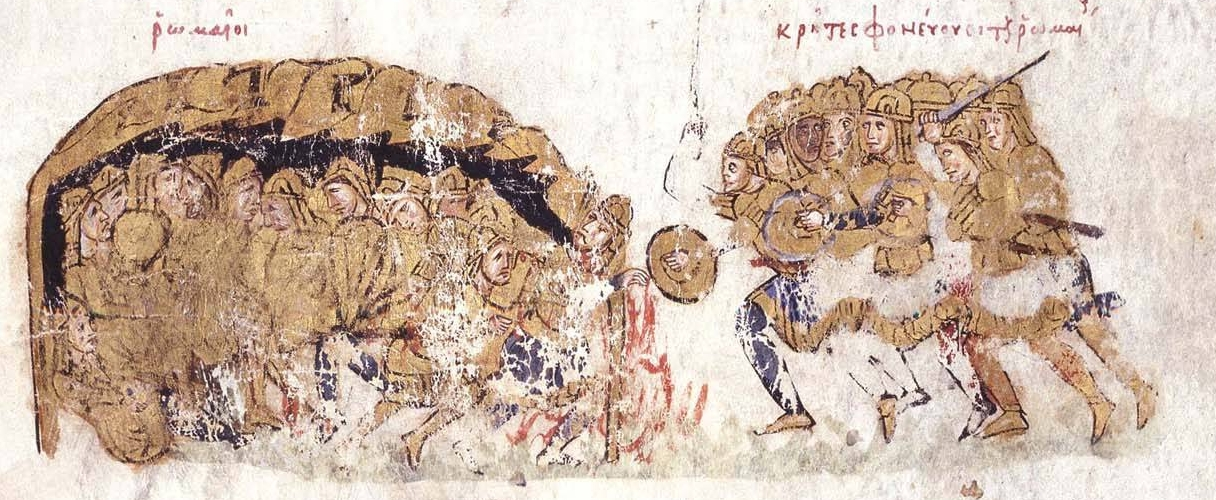
The Saracens attack at night and slay the sleeping Byzantines.

After the death of Theophilos in 842, new measures to confront the Cretan threat were undertaken by the new Byzantine regime: in 843 a new maritime theme, that of the Aegean Sea, was established to better deal with the Arab raids, and another expedition to recover Crete was launched under the personal leadership of the powerful logothetes and regent Theoktistos. Although it succeeded in occupying much of the island, Theoktistos had to abandon the army due to political intrigues in Constantinople, and the troops left behind were slaughtered by the Arabs. In an effort to weaken the Arabs in 853, several Byzantine fleets engaged in coordinated operations in the Eastern Mediterranean, attacking the Egyptian naval base of Damietta and capturing weapons intended for Crete. Despite some Byzantine successes against the Arabs in the following years, the Cretans resumed their raids in the early 860s, attacking the Peloponnese, the Cyclades, and Athos. In 866, the Byzantine Caesar Bardas assembled another large-scale expeditionary force to subdue Crete, but his murder by Basil the Macedonian only two weeks after the fleet set sail from the capital spelled the end of the undertaking.

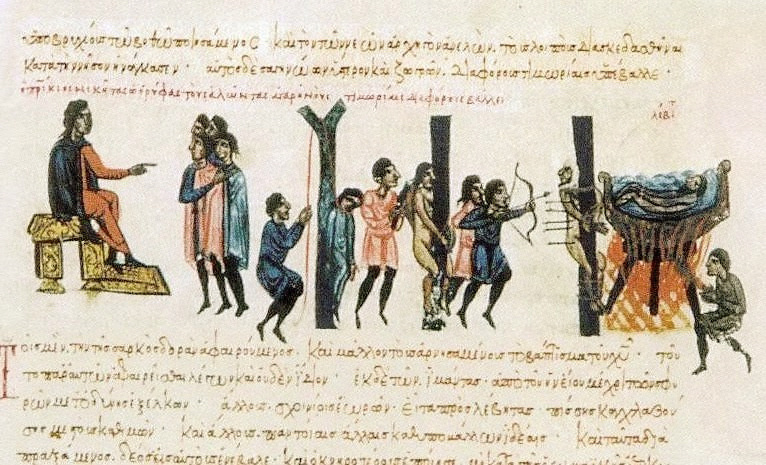
Ooryphas punishes the Cretan Saracens, as depicted in the Madrid Skylitzes

In the early 870s, the Cretan raids reached a new intensity: their fleets, often commanded by Byzantine renegades, ranged the Aegean and further afield, reaching the Dalmatian coasts. On one occasion c. 873 a Cretan fleet under the renegade Photios even penetrated into the Marmara Sea and unsuccessfully attacked Proconnesos, the first time since the Second Arab Siege of Constantinople in 717–718 that a Muslim fleet had come so close to the Byzantine capital. On its return, however, it suffered a heavy defeat at the hands of the new Byzantine admiral, Niketas Ooryphas, at the Battle of Kardia. Shortly after, Ooryphas once again defeated the Cretans at the Gulf of Corinth and took many prisoners, whom he tortured extensively in revenge for their raids. At about the same time, the Muslim fleet of Tarsus led by Yazaman al-Khadim was destroyed in a raid against Euripos. These Byzantine victories apparently led to a temporary truce, and it appears that the Cretan emir Saïpes (Shu'ayb ibn Umar) was obliged to pay tribute to Byzantium for about a decade.

Raids resumed soon after, in which the Cretans were joined by North African and Syrian fleets. The Peloponnese in particular suffered considerably from their raids, but also Euboea and the Cyclades: the islands of Patmos, Karpathos and nearby Sokastro came under Cretan control, and Cretan rule extended as far north as Aegina in the Saronic Gulf, and to Elafonisos and Cythera off the southern coast of the Peloponnese; the great Cycladic island of Naxos, probably along with the neighbouring islands of Paros and Ios, was forced to pay them the poll-tax (jizya). As the Muslim presence left generally few material or literary traces, the list of islands at one time controlled or occupied by them could well be longer. Nevertheless, the impact of this new wave of Arab raids was felt across the Aegean, where some islands were deserted altogether, and elsewhere coastal sites were abandoned for better protected inland locations. Athens may have been occupied in c. 896–902, and in 904, a Syrian fleet led by Leo of Tripoli sacked the Byzantine Empire's second city, Thessalonica. The Arabs of Crete co-operated closely with their Syrian counterparts, who often used Crete as a base or a stop-over, as during the return of Leo of Tripoli's fleet from Thessalonica, when many of the over 20,000 Thessalonian captives were sold or gifted as slaves in Crete. Likewise, the Cretan emirate received strong support from the Tulunid emirs of Egypt (868–905), but their Ikhshidid successors neglected aid to Crete. In 911, another large-scale Byzantine expedition of well over 100 ships was launched against Crete, headed by the admiral Himerios, but it was forced to leave the island after a few months. On its return journey, Himerios' fleet was destroyed in battle off Chios by the Syrian fleet.

=== Byzantine reconquest ===
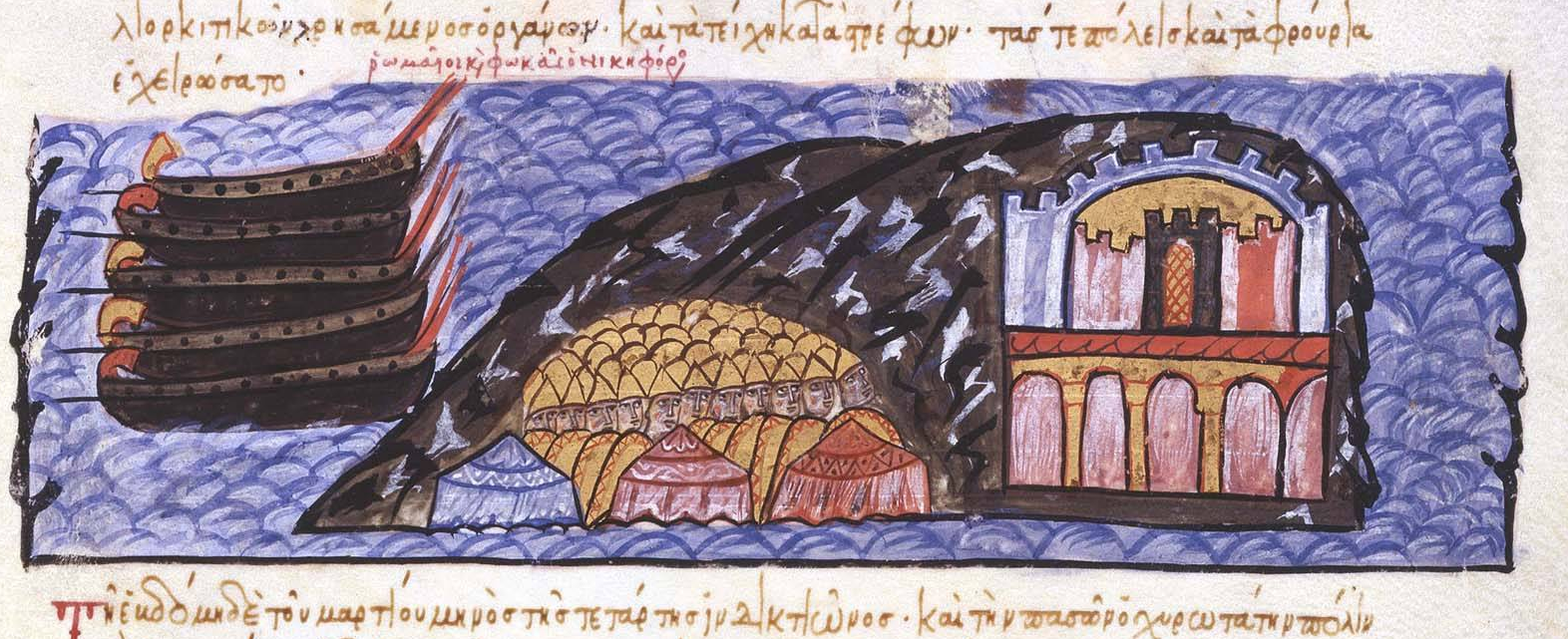
The siege of Chandax, the main Muslim stronghold in Crete, as depicted in the Madrid Skylitzes manuscript.

Cretan piracy reached another high in the 930s and 940s, devastating southern Greece, Athos, and the western coasts of Asia Minor. As a result, Emperor Constantine VII (r. 913–959) sent another expedition in 949. This too was routed in a surprise attack, a defeat which Byzantine chroniclers ascribe to the incompetence and inexperience of its leader, the eunuch chamberlain Constantine Gongyles. Constantine VII did not give up, and during the last years of his reign he began preparing another expedition. It would be carried out under his successor, Romanos II (r. 959–963), who entrusted its leadership to the capable general Nikephoros Phokas. At the head of a huge fleet and army, Phokas sailed in June or July 960, landed on the island, and defeated the initial Muslim resistance. A long siege of Chandax followed, which dragged over the winter into 961, when the city was stormed on 6 March.

The city was pillaged, and its mosques and walls were torn down. Muslim inhabitants were either killed or carried off into slavery, while the island's last emir Abd al-Aziz ibn Shu'ayb (Kouroupas) and his son al-Numan (Anemas) were taken captive and brought to Constantinople, where Phokas celebrated a triumph. The island was converted into a Byzantine theme, and the remaining Muslims were converted to Christianity by missionaries like Nikon "the Metanoeite". Among the converts was the prince Anemas, who entered Byzantine service and fell at Dorostolon, in the war of 970–971 against the Rus'.

== Legacy ==
This early Muslim period of Crete remains relatively obscure due to a paucity of surviving evidence regarding its internal history. Furthermore, other than a few place names recalling the presence of the Arabs, no major archaeological remains from the period survive, possibly due to deliberate Byzantine destruction after 961. This has influenced the way the emirate is generally regarded: scholars, forced to rely mostly on Byzantine accounts, have traditionally viewed the Emirate of Crete through a Byzantine lens as a quintessential "corsair's nest", surviving on piracy and the slave trade.

The picture painted by the few and scattered references to the Cretan emirate from the Muslim world, on the other hand, is of an ordered state with a regular monetary economy and extensive trade links, and there is evidence that Chandax was a cultural centre of some importance. The survival of numerous gold, silver, and copper coins, of almost constant weight and composition, testifies to a strong economy and a high living standard among the population. The economy was strengthened by extensive trade with the rest of the Muslim world, especially with Egypt, and by a booming agriculture: the need to sustain an independent state, as well as access to the markets of the Muslim world, led to an intensification of cultivation. It is also possible that sugar cane was introduced to Crete at the time.

It is unclear what happened to the island's Christians after the Muslim conquest; the traditional view is that most were either converted or expelled. There is evidence from Muslim sources, however, for the continued survival of Christians on Crete, as a subject class, as in other Muslim conquests, although according to the same sources the Muslims, whether descendants of the Andalusians, more recent migrants, or converts (or any combination of these) formed the majority. There is also evidence of rival classes on the island as when Theodosius the Deacon reports that the rural Cretans, not rulers of the land but inhabitants of crags and caves, descended from the mountains under their leader Karamountes during the siege of Chandax by Nikephoros Phokas to assist the besieged. It seems that the Byzantine Christian population of the countryside was left relatively alone, while the Muslim element (including native converts) predominated in the cities.

== List of emirs ==
The succession of the emirs of Crete has been established by Arab and Byzantine sources, but chiefly through their coinage. The dates of their reigns are therefore largely approximate:

Name	Name in Greek sources	Reign
Abu Hafs Umar (I) al-Iqritishi	Apohaps/Apohapsis (Ἀπόχαψ/Ἀπόχαψις)	827/828 – c. 855
Shu'ayb (I) ibn Umar	Saipes/Saet (Σαΐπης/Σαῆτ)	c. 855–880
Umar (II) ibn Shu'ayb	Babdel (Βαβδέλ)	c. 880–895
Muhammad ibn Shu'ayb al-Zarkun	Zerkounes (Ζερκουνῆς)	c. 895–910
Yusuf ibn Umar		c. 910–915
Ali ibn Yusuf		c. 915–925
Ahmad ibn Umar		c. 925–940
Shu'ayb (II) ibn Ahmad		940–943
Ali ibn Ahmad		943–949
Abd al-Aziz ibn Shu'ayb	Kouroupas (Κουρουπᾶς)	949–961

== See also ==
- List of Sunni Muslim dynasties
- Early Caliphate navy

== Sources ==
- Canard, M. (1971). "Iḳrīṭis̲h̲". In Lewis, B.; Ménage, V. L.; Pellat, Ch. & Schacht, J. (eds.). The Encyclopaedia of Islam, Second Edition. Volume III: H–Iram. Leiden: E. J. Brill. pp. 1082–1086. OCLC 495469525.
- Christides, Vassilios (1981). "The Raids of the Moslems of Crete in the Aegean Sea: Piracy and Conquest". Byzantion. 51: 76–111.
- Christides, Vassilios (1984). The Conquest of Crete by the Arabs (ca. 824): A Turning Point in the Struggle between Byzantium and Islam. Academy of Athens. OCLC 14344967.
- Kazhdan, Alexander (1991). "Anemas". In Kazhdan, Alexander (ed.). The Oxford Dictionary of Byzantium. Oxford and New York: Oxford University Press. p. 96. ISBN 0-19-504652-8.
- Kubiak, Władyslaw B. (1970). "The Byzantine Attack on Damietta in 853 and the Egyptian Navy in the 9th Century". Byzantion. 40: 45–66. ISSN 0378-2506.
- Makrypoulias, Christos G. (2000). "Byzantine Expeditions against the Emirate of Crete c. 825–949". Graeco-Arabica. 7–8: 347–362.
- Miles, George C. (1964). "Byzantium and the Arabs: Relations in Crete and the Aegean Area". Dumbarton Oaks Papers. 18: 1–32. doi:10.2307/1291204. JSTOR 1291204.
- Treadgold, Warren (1988). The Byzantine Revival, 780–842. Stanford, California: Stanford University Press. ISBN 978-0-8047-1462-4.
- Treadgold, Warren (1997). A History of the Byzantine State and Society. Stanford, California: Stanford University Press. ISBN 0-8047-2630-2.
- Wortley, John, ed. (2010). John Skylitzes: A Synopsis of Byzantine History, 811–1057. Cambridge: Cambridge University Press. ISBN 978-0-521-76705-7.
