= August 25 =

August 25 this year in various calendars
- Tuesday, 25 August 2026
| Akan | Kwabene |
| Armenian | 6 Hoṙi 1476 |
| Aztec | Atemoztli 7, 7 Cuāuhtli |
| Babylonian | 11 Abu, 2337 SE |
| Balinese pawukon | Luang, Pepet, Beteng, Sri, Wage, Was, Anggara of Matal, Ludra, Ogan, Raja |
| Bengali | 10 Bhadro, BS 1433 |
| Chinese | Yin Metal Goat・Tail Mansion; Fire Horse Year, Month 7, Day 13 (Chushu, 13 days until Bailu) |
| Common Era | 25 August 2026 CE |
| Coptic | 19 Mesori, AM 1742 |
| Egyptian | 11 Tybi, 2775 NE |
| Ethiopian | 19 Naḥasē, 2018 Amätä Məhrät |
| French Republican | Décade I, Octidi de Fructidor de l'Année 234 de la République |
| Gregorian | 25 August, AD 2026 |
| Hebrew | 12 Elul, AM 5786 |
| Hindu | Uttarāṣāḍha・Ayuṣmān; Solar: 9 Bhādrapada, 1948 SE; Lunisolar: Trayodaśī, Śukla pakṣa of Śrāvaṇa, 2083 VE; Rāudra・5127 KY・1,872,812 |
| Icelandic | Þriðjudagur, 1 Tvímánuður 2026 |
| Islamic | 11 Rabi' al-awwal, AH 1448 (using tabular method) |
| ISO week date | 2026-W35-2 |
| Japanese | 13 Fumizuki, Reiwa 8 (Shosho, 13 days until Hakuro) |
| Julian | 12 August, AD 2026 (AM 7534) |
| Julian day | 2461278 |
| Korean | 13 Wonsungidal, 4359 DE |
| Maya | 13.0.13.15.15; 8 Mol, 7 Men |
| Roman | Pridie Idus Augustas, MMDCCLXXIX AUC |
| Solar Hijri | 3 Shahrivar, SH 1405 |
| Tibetan | 13 gro bzhin, me pho rta 2153 or 1772 or 1000 |

| << | August | | | | | >> |
| Su | Mo | Tu | We | Th | Fr | Sa |
| | | | | | | 1 |
| 2 | 3 | 4 | 5 | 6 | 7 | 8 |
| 9 | 10 | 11 | 12 | 13 | 14 | 15 |
| 16 | 17 | 18 | 19 | 20 | 21 | 22 |
| 23 | 24 | 25 | 26 | 27 | 28 | 29 |
| 30 | 31 |
2026

August 25 in recent years
2026 (Tuesday)
2025 (Monday)
2024 (Sunday)
2023 (Friday)
2022 (Thursday)
2021 (Wednesday)
2020 (Tuesday)
2019 (Sunday)
2018 (Saturday)
2017 (Friday)

August 25 is the 237th day of the year (238th in leap years) in the Gregorian calendar; 128 days remain until the end of the year.

== Events ==
=== Pre-1600 ===
- 383 AD – Roman Emperor Gratian is murdered at a banquet after having surrendered to the forces of rival emperor Magnus Maximus.
- 450 – Marcian is proclaimed Eastern Roman emperor at Hebdomon and marries empress Pulcheria.
- 766 – Emperor Constantine V humiliates nineteen high-ranking officials, after discovering a plot against him. He executes the leaders, Constantine Podopagouros and his brother Strategios.
- 1248 – The Dutch city of Ommen receives city rights and fortification rights from Otto III, the Archbishop of Utrecht.
- 1258 – Regent George Mouzalon and his brothers are killed during a coup headed by the aristocratic faction under Michael VIII Palaiologos, paving the way for its leader to ultimately usurp the throne of the Empire of Nicaea.
- 1270 – Philip III, although suffering from dysentery, becomes King of France following the death of his father Louis IX, during the Eighth Crusade. His uncle, Charles I of Naples, is forced to begin peace negotiations with Muhammad I al-Mustansir, Hafsid Sultan of Tunis.
- 1537 – The Honourable Artillery Company, the oldest surviving regiment in the British Army, and the second most senior, is formed.
- 1543 – António Mota and a few companions become the first Europeans to visit Japan.
- 1580 – War of the Portuguese Succession: Spanish victory at the Battle of Alcântara brings about the Iberian Union.

=== 1601–1900 ===
- 1609 – Galileo Galilei demonstrates his first telescope to Venetian lawmakers.
- 1630 – Portuguese forces are defeated by the Kingdom of Kandy at the Battle of Randeniwela in Sri Lanka.
- 1651 – A parliamentarian army defeats a royalist army under James Stanley, 7th Earl of Derby, in the battle of Wigan Lane during the Third English Civial War.
- 1758 – Seven Years' War: Frederick II of Prussia defeats the Russian army at the Battle of Zorndorf.
- 1814 – War of 1812: On the second day of the burning of Washington, British troops torch the Library of Congress, United States Treasury, Department of War, and other public buildings.
- 1823 – American fur trapper Hugh Glass is mauled by a grizzly bear while on an expedition in South Dakota.
- 1825 – The Thirty-Three Orientals declare the independence of Uruguay from Brazil.
- 1830 – The Belgian Revolution begins.
- 1835 – The first Great Moon Hoax article is published in The New York Sun, announcing the discovery of life and civilization on the Moon.
- 1875 – Captain Matthew Webb becomes the first person to swim across the English Channel, traveling from Dover, England, to Calais, France, in 21 hours and 45 minutes.
- 1883 – France and Viet Nam sign the Treaty of Huế, recognizing a French protectorate over Annam and Tonkin.
- 1894 – Kitasato Shibasaburō discovers the infectious agent of the bubonic plague and publishes his findings in The Lancet.

=== 1901–present ===
- 1904 – Russo-Japanese War: The Battle of Liaoyang begins.
- 1912 – The Kuomintang is founded for the first time in Peking.
- 1914 – World War I: Japan declares war on Austria-Hungary.
- 1914 – World War I: The library of the Catholic University of Leuven is deliberately destroyed by the German Army. Hundreds of thousands of irreplaceable volumes and Gothic and Renaissance manuscripts are lost.
- 1916 – The United States National Park Service is created.
- 1920 – Polish–Soviet War: Battle of Warsaw, which began on August 13, ends with the Red Army's defeat.
- 1933 – The Diexi earthquake strikes Mao County, Sichuan, China and kills 9,000 people.
- 1933 – Nazi Germany and the Zionist Federation of Germany signed the Haavara Agreement. The agreement was a major factor in breaking the anti-Nazi boycott of 1933 and facilitated Jewish emigration from Germany and into British Mandate of Palestine.
- 1939 – As part of its S-Plan, the Irish Republican Army carries out the 1939 Coventry bombing in which five civilians were killed.
- 1939 – The United Kingdom and Poland form a military alliance in which the UK promises to defend Poland in case of invasion by a foreign power.
- 1940 – World War II: The first Bombing of Berlin by the British Royal Air Force.
- 1941 – World War II: Anglo-Soviet invasion of Iran: The United Kingdom and the Soviet Union jointly stage an invasion of the Imperial State of Iran.
- 1942 – World War II: Second day of the Battle of the Eastern Solomons; a Japanese naval transport convoy headed towards Guadalcanal is turned back by an Allied air attack.
- 1942 – World War II: Battle of Milne Bay: Japanese marines assault Allied airfields at Milne Bay, New Guinea, initiating the Battle of Milne Bay.
- 1944 – World War II: Paris is liberated by the Allies.
- 1945 – Ten days after World War II ends with Japan announcing its surrender, armed supporters of the Chinese Communist Party kill U.S. intelligence officer John Birch, regarded by some of the American right as the first victim of the Cold War.
- 1945 – The August Revolution ends as Emperor Bảo Đại abdicates, ending the Nguyễn dynasty.
- 1948 – The House Un-American Activities Committee holds first-ever televised congressional hearing: "Confrontation Day" between Whittaker Chambers and Alger Hiss.
- 1950 – To avert a threatened strike during the Korean War, President Truman orders Secretary of the Army Frank Pace to seize control of the nation's railroads.
- 1958 – The world's first publicly marketed instant noodles, Chikin Ramen, are introduced by Taiwanese-Japanese businessman Momofuku Ando.
- 1960 – The Games of the XVII Olympiad commence in Rome, Italy.
- 1961 – President Jânio Quadros of Brazil resigns after just seven months in power, initiating a political crisis that culminates in a military coup in 1964.
- 1967 – George Lincoln Rockwell, founder of the American Nazi Party, is assassinated by a former member of his group.
- 1980 – Zimbabwe joins the United Nations.
- 1980 – The last performance of the Jahrhundertring at the Bayreuth Festival receives ovations of 45 minutes.
- 1981 – Voyager 2 spacecraft makes its closest approach to Saturn.
- 1985 – Bar Harbor Airlines Flight 1808 crashes near Auburn/Lewiston Municipal Airport in Auburn, Maine, killing all eight people on board including peace activist and child actress Samantha Smith.
- 1989 – Voyager 2 spacecraft makes its closest approach to Neptune, the last planet in the Solar System at the time, due to Pluto being within Neptune's orbit from 1979 to 1999.
- 1989 – Pakistan International Airlines Flight 404, carrying 54 people, disappears over the Himalayas after takeoff from Gilgit Airport in Pakistan. The aircraft was never found.
- 1991 – Belarus gains its independence from the Soviet Union.
- 1991 – The Battle of Vukovar begins. An 87-day siege of Vukovar by the Yugoslav People's Army (JNA), supported by various Serb paramilitary forces, between August and November 1991 (during the Croatian War of Independence).
- 1991 – Linus Torvalds announces the first version of what will become Linux.
- 1997 – Egon Krenz, the former East German leader, is convicted of a shoot-to-kill policy at the Berlin Wall.
- 2001 – American singer Aaliyah and several members of her entourage are killed as their overloaded aircraft crashes shortly after takeoff from Marsh Harbour Airport, Bahamas.
- 2003 – NASA successfully launches the Spitzer Space Telescope into space.
- 2005 – Hurricane Katrina makes landfall in Florida.
- 2006 – Former Prime Minister of Ukraine Pavlo Lazarenko is sentenced to nine years imprisonment for money laundering, wire fraud, and extortion.
- 2010 – A Filair Let L-410 Turbolet crashes on approach to Bandundu Airport, killing 20.
- 2011 – Fifty-two people are killed during an arson attack caused by members of the drug cartel Los Zetas.
- 2012 – Voyager 1 spacecraft enters interstellar space, becoming the first man-made object to do so.
- 2017 – Hurricane Harvey makes landfall in Texas as a powerful Category 4 hurricane, the strongest hurricane to make landfall in the United States since 2004.
- 2017 – Conflict in Rakhine State (2016–present): One hundred seventy people are killed in at least 26 separate attacks carried out by the Arakan Rohingya Salvation Army, leading to the governments of Myanmar and Malaysia designating the group as a terrorist organisation.

== Births ==
=== Pre-1600 ===
- 1467 – Francisco Fernández de la Cueva, 2nd Duke of Alburquerque, Spanish duke (died 1526)
- 1491 – Innocenzo Cybo, Italian cardinal (died 1550)
- 1509 – Ippolito II d'Este, Italian cardinal and statesman (died 1572)
- 1530 – Ivan the Terrible, Russian ruler (died 1584)
- 1540 – Lady Catherine Grey, English noblewoman (died 1568)
- 1561 – Philippe van Lansberge, Dutch astronomer and mathematician (died 1632)

=== 1601–1900 ===
- 1605 – Philipp Moritz, Count of Hanau-Münzenberg, German noble (died 1638)
- 1624 – François de la Chaise, French priest (died 1709)
- 1662 – John Leverett the Younger, American lawyer, academic, and politician (died 1724)
- 1707 – Louis I of Spain (died 1724)
- 1724 – George Stubbs, English painter and academic (died 1806)
- 1741 – Karl Friedrich Bahrdt, German theologian and author (died 1792)
- 1744 – Johann Gottfried Herder, German poet, philosopher, and critic (died 1803)
- 1758 – Franz Teyber, Austrian organist and composer (died 1810)
- 1767 – Louis Antoine de Saint-Just, French soldier and politician (died 1794)
- 1776 – Thomas Bladen Capel, English admiral (died 1853)
- 1786 – Ludwig I of Bavaria, King of Bavaria (died 1868)
- 1793 – John Neal, American writer, critic, editor, lecturer, and activist (died 1876)
- 1796 – James Lick, American carpenter and piano builder (died 1876)
- 1802 – Nikolaus Lenau, Romanian-Austrian poet and author (died 1850)
- 1803 – Luís Alves de Lima e Silva, Duke of Caxias (died 1880)
- 1812 – Nikolay Zinin, Russian organic chemist (died 1880)
- 1817 – Marie-Eugénie de Jésus, French nun and saint, founded the Religious of the Assumption (died 1898)
- 1819 – Allan Pinkerton Scottish-American barrel maker, private detective (co-founder of Pinkerton Agency), abolitionist, and spy (died 1884)
- 1828 – Jane Stanford American philanthropist, co-founder of Stanford University, first lady of California (died 1905)
- 1829 – Carlo Acton, Italian pianist and composer (died 1909)
- 1836 – Bret Harte, American short story writer and poet (died 1902)
- 1840 – George C. Magoun, American businessman (died 1893)
- 1841 – Emil Theodor Kocher, Swiss physician and academic, Nobel Prize laureate (died 1917)
- 1845 – Ludwig II of Bavaria, King of Bavaria (died 1886)
- 1850 – Charles Richet, French physiologist and occultist, Nobel Prize laureate (died 1935)
- 1867 – James W. Gerard, American lawyer and diplomat, United States Ambassador to Germany (died 1951)
- 1869 – Tom Kiely, British-Irish decathlete (died 1951)
- 1875 – Agnes Mowinckel, Norwegian actress (died 1963)
- 1877 – Joshua Lionel Cowen, American businessman, co-founded the Lionel Corporation (died 1965)
- 1878 – Ted Birnie, English footballer and manager (died 1935)
- 1882 – Seán T. O'Kelly, Irish journalist and politician, 2nd President of Ireland (died 1966)
- 1889 – Alexander Mair, Australian politician, 26th Premier of New South Wales (died 1969)
- 1891 – David Shimoni, Belarusian-Israeli poet and translator (died 1956)
- 1893 – Henry Trendley Dean, American dentist (died 1962)
- 1898 – Helmut Hasse, German mathematician and academic (died 1975)
- 1898 – Arthur Wood, English cricketer (died 1973)
- 1899 – Paul Herman Buck, American historian and author (died 1978)
- 1900 – Isobel Hogg Kerr Beattie, Scottish architect (died 1970)
- 1900 – Hans Adolf Krebs, German physician and biochemist, Nobel Prize laureate (died 1981)

=== 1901–present ===
- 1902 – Stefan Wolpe, German-American composer and educator (died 1972)
- 1903 – Arpad Elo, Hungarian-American chess player, created the Elo rating system (died 1992)
- 1905 – Faustina Kowalska, Polish nun and saint (died 1938)
- 1906 – Jim Smith, English cricketer (died 1979)
- 1909 – Ruby Keeler, Canadian-American actress, singer, and dancer (died 1993)
- 1909 – Michael Rennie, English actor and producer (died 1971)
- 1910 – George Cisar, American baseball player (died 2010)
- 1910 – Dorothea Tanning, American painter, sculptor, and poet (died 2012)
- 1911 – Võ Nguyên Giáp, Vietnamese general and politician, 3rd Minister of Defence for Vietnam (died 2013)
- 1912 – Erich Honecker, German politician (died 1994)
- 1913 – Don DeFore, American actor (died 1993)
- 1913 – Walt Kelly, American illustrator and animator (died 1973)
- 1916 – Van Johnson, American actor (died 2008)
- 1916 – Frederick Chapman Robbins, American pediatrician and virologist, Nobel Prize laureate (died 2003)
- 1916 – Saburō Sakai, Japanese lieutenant and pilot (died 2000)
- 1917 – Mel Ferrer, American actor, director, and producer (died 2008)
- 1918 – Leonard Bernstein, American pianist, composer, and conductor (died 1990)
- 1918 – Richard Greene, English actor (died 1985)
- 1919 – William P. Foster, American bandleader and educator (died 2010)
- 1919 – George Wallace, American lawyer, and politician, 45th Governor of Alabama (died 1998)
- 1919 – Jaap Rijks, Dutch Olympic medalist (died 2017)
- 1921 – Monty Hall, Canadian television personality and game show host (died 2017)
- 1921 – Bryce Mackasey, Canadian businessman and politician, 20th Canadian Minister of Labour (died 1999)
- 1921 – Brian Moore, Northern Irish-Canadian author and screenwriter (died 1999)
- 1923 – Álvaro Mutis, Colombian-Mexican author and poet (died 2013)
- 1923 – Allyre Sirois, Canadian lawyer and judge (died 2012)
- 1924 – Zsuzsa Körmöczy, Hungarian tennis player and coach (died 2006)
- 1925 – Thea Astley, Australian journalist and author (died 2004)
- 1925 – Hilmar Hoffmann, German film and culture academic (died 2018)
- 1925 – Stepas Butautas, Lithuanian basketball player and coach (died 2001)
- 1927 – Althea Gibson, American tennis player and golfer (died 2003)
- 1927 – Des Renford, Australian swimmer (died 1999)
- 1928 – John "Kayo" Dottley, American football player (died 2018)
- 1928 – Darrell Johnson, American baseball player, coach, and manager (died 2004)
- 1928 – Karl Korte, American composer and academic (died 2022)
- 1928 – Herbert Kroemer, German-American physicist, engineer, and academic, Nobel Prize laureate (died 2024)
- 1930 – Sean Connery, Scottish actor and producer (died 2020)
- 1930 – György Enyedi, Hungarian economist and geographer (died 2012)
- 1930 – Graham Jarvis, Canadian actor (died 2003)
- 1930 – Crispin Tickell, English academic and diplomat, British Permanent Representative to the United Nations (died 2022)
- 1931 – Regis Philbin, American actor and television host (died 2020)
- 1932 – Anatoly Kartashov, Soviet aviator and cosmonaut (died 2005)
- 1933 – Patrick F. McManus, American journalist and author (died 2018)
- 1933 – Wayne Shorter, American saxophonist and composer (died 2023)
- 1933 – Tom Skerritt, American actor (died 2026)
- 1934 – Lise Bacon, Canadian judge and politician, Deputy Premier of Quebec (died 2025)
- 1934 – Eddie Ilarde, Filipino journalist and politician (died 2020)
- 1935 – Charles Wright, American poet
- 1936 – Giridharilal Kedia, Indian businessman (died 2009)
- 1937 – Jimmy Hannan, Australian television host and singer (died 2019)
- 1937 – Virginia Euwer Wolff, American author
- 1938 – David Canary, American actor (died 2015)
- 1938 – Frederick Forsyth, English journalist and author (died 2025)
- 1939 – John Badham, English-American actor, director, and producer
- 1939 – Marshall Brickman, Brazilian-American director, producer, and screenwriter (died 2024)
- 1940 – Wilhelm von Homburg, German boxer and actor (died 2004)
- 1941 – Mario Corso, Italian footballer and coach (died 2020)
- 1941 – Ludwig Müller, German footballer (died 2021)
- 1942 – Nathan Deal, American lawyer, and politician, 82nd Governor of Georgia
- 1942 – Pat Ingoldsby, Irish poet and television presenter (died 2025)
- 1942 – Ivan Koloff, Canadian wrestler (died 2017)
- 1943 – Pete Stemkowski, Canadian ice hockey player
- 1944 – Conrad Black, Canadian historian and author
- 1944 – Jacques Demers, Canadian ice hockey player, coach, and politician
- 1944 – Anthony Heald, American actor
- 1944 – Andrew Longmore, British lawyer and judge
- 1945 – Daniel Hulet, Belgian cartoonist (died 2011)
- 1945 – Hannah Louise Shearer, American screenwriter and producer
- 1946 – Rollie Fingers, American baseball player
- 1946 – Charles Ghigna, American poet and author
- 1946 – Charlie Sanders, American football player and sportscaster (died 2015)
- 1947 – Michael Kaluta, American author and illustrator
- 1947 – Keith Tippett, British jazz pianist and composer (died 2020)
- 1948 – Ledward Kaapana, American singer and guitarist
- 1948 – Nicholas A. Peppas, Greek chemist and biologist
- 1949 – Martin Amis, British novelist (died 2023)
- 1949 – Rijkman Groenink, Dutch banker and academic
- 1949 – John Savage, American actor and producer
- 1949 – Gene Simmons, Israeli-American singer-songwriter, producer, and actor
- 1950 – Willy DeVille, American singer and songwriter (died 2009)
- 1950 – Charles Fambrough, American bassist, composer, and producer (died 2011)
- 1951 – Rob Halford, English heavy metal singer-songwriter
- 1951 – Bill Handel, Brazilian-American lawyer and radio host
- 1952 – Kurban Berdyev, Turkmen footballer and manager
- 1952 – Geoff Downes, English keyboard player, songwriter, and producer
- 1952 – Duleep Mendis, Sri Lankan cricketer and coach
- 1954 – Elvis Costello, English singer-songwriter, guitarist, and producer
- 1954 – Jim Wallace, Baron Wallace of Tankerness, Scottish lawyer and politician, First Minister of Scotland
- 1955 – John McGeoch, Scottish guitarist (died 2004)
- 1955 – Gerd Müller, German businessman and politician
- 1956 – Matt Aitken, English songwriter and record producer
- 1956 – Takeshi Okada, Japanese footballer, coach, and manager
- 1956 – Henri Toivonen, Finnish race car driver (died 1986)
- 1957 – Sikander Bakht, Pakistani cricketer and sportscaster
- 1957 – Simon McBurney, English actor and director
- 1957 – Frank Serratore, American ice hockey player and coach
- 1958 – Tim Burton, American director, producer, and screenwriter
- 1958 – Christian LeBlanc, American actor
- 1959 – Ian Falconer, American author and illustrator (died 2023)
- 1959 – Steve Levy, American lawyer and politician
- 1959 – Bernardo Rezende, Brazilian volleyball coach and player
- 1959 – Lane Smith, American author and illustrator
- 1959 – Ruth Ann Swenson, American soprano and actress
- 1960 – Ashley Crow, American actress
- 1960 – David Mabuza, South African politician, 8th Deputy President of South Africa (died 2025)
- 1960 – Georg Zellhofer, Austrian footballer and manager
- 1961 – Billy Ray Cyrus, American singer-songwriter, guitarist, and actor
- 1961 – Dave Tippett, Canadian ice hockey player and coach
- 1961 – Ally Walker, American actress
- 1961 – Joanne Whalley, English actress
- 1962 – Taslima Nasrin, Bangladeshi author
- 1962 – Theresa Andrews, American swimmer
- 1962 – Vivian Campbell, Northern Irish rock guitarist and songwriter
- 1962 – Michael Zorc, German footballer
- 1963 – Miro Cerar, Slovenian lawyer and politician, 8th Prime Minister of Slovenia
- 1963 – Shock G, American rapper and producer (died 2021)
- 1963 – Tiina Intelmann, Estonian lawyer and diplomat
- 1964 – Azmin Ali, Malaysian mathematician and politician
- 1964 – Maxim Kontsevich, Russian-American mathematician and academic
- 1964 – Blair Underwood, American actor
- 1965 – Cornelius Bennett, American football player
- 1965 – Tim Cain, American video game designer
- 1965 – Sanjeev Sharma, Indian cricketer and coach
- 1965 – Mia Zapata, American singer (died 1993)
- 1966 – Albert Belle, American baseball player
- 1966 – Michael Cohen, former personal attorney to Donald Trump
- 1966 – Robert Maschio, American actor
- 1966 – Derek Sherinian, American keyboard player, songwriter, and producer
- 1966 – Terminator X, American hip-hop DJ
- 1967 – Tom Hollander, English actor
- 1967 – Jeff Tweedy, American singer-songwriter, musician, and producer
- 1967 – Jon Husted, American politician
- 1968 – David Alan Basche, American actor
- 1968 – Stuart Murdoch, Scottish singer-songwriter
- 1968 – Spider One, American singer-songwriter and producer
- 1968 – Rachael Ray, American chef, author, and television host
- 1968 – Takeshi Ueda, Japanese singer-songwriter and bass player
- 1969 – Olga Konkova, Norwegian-Russian pianist and composer
- 1969 – Cameron Mathison, Canadian actor and television personality
- 1969 – Catriona Matthew, Scottish golfer
- 1969 – Vivek Razdan, Indian cricketer, coach, and sportscaster
- 1970 – Doug Glanville, American baseball player and sportscaster
- 1970 – Debbie Graham, American tennis player
- 1970 – Robert Horry, American basketball player and sportscaster
- 1970 – Adrian Lam, Papua New Guinean-Australian rugby league player and coach
- 1970 – Sille Lundquist, Danish model and fashion model (died 2018)
- 1970 – Jo Dee Messina, American singer-songwriter
- 1970 – Claudia Schiffer, German model and fashion designer
- 1971 – Jason Death, Australian rugby league player
- 1971 – Nathan Page, Australian actor
- 1972 – Marvin Harrison, American football player
- 1973 – Fatih Akın, German director, producer, and screenwriter
- 1974 – Eric Millegan, American actor
- 1974 – Pablo Ozuna, Dominican baseball player
- 1975 – Brad Drew, Australian rugby league player
- 1975 – Petria Thomas, Australian swimmer and coach
- 1976 – Damon Jones, American basketball player and coach
- 1976 – Javed Qadeer, Pakistani cricketer and coach
- 1976 – Alexander Skarsgård, Swedish actor
- 1977 – Masumi Asano, Japanese voice actress and producer
- 1977 – Andy McDonald, Canadian ice hockey player
- 1977 – Jonathan Togo, American actor
- 1978 – Kel Mitchell, American actor, producer, and screenwriter
- 1978 – Robert Mohr, German rugby player
- 1979 – Marlon Harewood, English footballer
- 1979 – Philipp Mißfelder, German historian and politician (died 2015)
- 1979 – Deanna Nolan, American basketball player
- 1981 – Rachel Bilson, American actress
- 1981 – Jan-Berrie Burger, Namibian cricketer
- 1981 – Camille Pin, French tennis player
- 1982 – Jung Jung-suk, South Korean footballer (died 2011)
- 1982 – Nick Schultz, Canadian ice hockey player
- 1983 – James Rossiter, English race car driver
- 1984 – Florian Mohr, German footballer
- 1984 – Anya Monzikova, Russian-American model and actress
- 1986 – Rodney Ferguson, American footballer
- 1987 – Stacey Farber, Canadian actress
- 1987 – Velimir Jovanović, Serbian footballer
- 1987 – Blake Lively, American model and actress
- 1987 – Amy Macdonald, Scottish singer-songwriter and guitarist
- 1987 – Justin Upton, American baseball player
- 1987 – Adam Warren, American baseball player
- 1987 – James Wesolowski, Australian footballer
- 1988 – Angela Park, Brazilian-American golfer
- 1988 – Giga Chikadze, Georgian mixed martial artist and kickboxer
- 1989 – Hiram Mier, Mexican footballer
- 1989 – Jaakko Ohtonen, Finnish actor
- 1990 – Max Muncy, American baseball player
- 1992 – Miyabi Natsuyaki, Japanese singer and actress
- 1992 – Ricardo Rodriguez, Swiss footballer
- 1994 – Edmunds Augstkalns, Latvian ice hockey player
- 1994 – Caris LeVert, American basketball player
- 1995 – Ong Seong-wu, South Korean singer and actor
- 1995 – Dowoon, South Korean musician
- 1998 – China Anne McClain, American actress and singer
- 2000 – Nicki Nicole, Argentine rapper and singer-songwriter
- 2003 – Rebeka Jančová, Slovak alpine ski racer
- 2004 – Evann Girault, French-Nigerien sabre fencer
- 2006 – Kimi Antonelli, Italian race car driver

== Deaths ==
=== Pre-1600 ===
- AD 79 – Pliny the Elder, Roman commander and philosopher (born 23)
- 274 – Yang Yan, Jin Dynasty empress (born 238)
- 306 – Saint Maginus, Christian hermit and martyr from Tarragona
- 383 – Gratian, Roman emperor (born 359)
- 471 – Gennadius I, patriarch of Constantinople
- 766 – Constantine Podopagouros, Byzantine official
- 766 – Strategios Podopagouros, Byzantine general
- 985 – Dietrich of Haldensleben, German margrave
- 1091 – Sisnando Davides, military leader
- 1192 – Hugh III, Duke of Burgundy (born 1142)
- 1258 – George Mouzalon, regent of the Empire of Nicaea
- 1270 – Louis IX of France (born 1214)
- 1270 – Alphonso of Brienne (born c. 1225)
- 1271 – Joan, Countess of Toulouse (born 1220)
- 1282 – Thomas de Cantilupe, English bishop and saint (born 1218)
- 1322 – Beatrice of Silesia, queen consort of Germany (born c. 1292)
- 1327 – Demasq Kaja, Chobanid
- 1330 – Sir James Douglas, Scottish guerrilla leader (born 1286)
- 1339 – Henry de Cobham, 1st Baron Cobham (born 1260)
- 1368 – Andrea Orcagna, Italian painter, sculptor, and architect
- 1482 – Margaret of Anjou wife of Henry VI and Queen Consort of England and disputed Queen Consort of France (born 1429)
- 1485 – William Catesby, supporter of Richard III (born 1450)
- 1554 – Thomas Howard, 3rd Duke of Norfolk, English soldier and politician, Lord High Treasurer (born 1473)
- 1592 – William IV, Landgrave of Hesse-Kassel (born 1532)
- 1600 – Hosokawa Gracia, Japanese aristocrat and Catholic convert (born 1563)

=== 1601–1900 ===
- 1603 – Ahmad al-Mansur, Sultan of the Saadi dynasty (born 1549)
- 1631 – Nicholas Hyde, Lord Chief Justice of England (bornc. 1572)
- 1632 – Thomas Dekker, English author and playwright (born 1572)
- 1688 – Henry Morgan, Welsh admiral and politician, Lieutenant Governor of Jamaica (born 1635)
- 1699 – Christian V of Denmark (born 1646)
- 1711 – Edward Villiers, 1st Earl of Jersey, English politician, Secretary of State for the Southern Department (born 1656)
- 1742 – Carlos Seixas, Portuguese organist and composer (born 1704)
- 1774 – Niccolò Jommelli, Italian composer and educator (born 1714)
- 1776 – David Hume, Scottish economist, historian, and philosopher (born 1711)
- 1794 – Florimond Claude, Comte de Mercy-Argenteau, Belgian-Austrian diplomat (born 1727)
- 1797 – Thomas Chittenden, Governor of the Vermont Republic, and first Governor of the State of Vermont (born 1730)
- 1815 – Stephen Badlam, American artisan and military officer (born 1751)
- 1819 – James Watt, Scottish engineer and instrument maker (born 1736)
- 1822 – William Herschel, German-English astronomer and composer (born 1738)
- 1867 – Michael Faraday, English physicist and chemist (born 1791)
- 1882 – Friedrich Reinhold Kreutzwald, Estonian physician and author (born 1803)
- 1886 – Zinovios Valvis, Greek lawyer and politician, 35th Prime Minister of Greece (born 1800)
- 1892 – William Champ, English-Australian politician, 1st Premier of Tasmania (born 1808)
- 1900 – Friedrich Nietzsche, German philologist, philosopher, and critic (born 1844)

=== 1901–present ===
- 1904 – Henri Fantin-Latour, French painter and lithographer (born 1836)
- 1908 – Henri Becquerel, French physicist and chemist, Nobel Prize laureate (born 1852)
- 1916 – Mary Tappan Wright, American novelist and short story writer (born 1851)
- 1921 – Nikolay Gumilyov, Russian poet and critic (born 1886)
- 1924 – Mariano Álvarez, Filipino general and politician (born 1842)
- 1924 – Velma Caldwell Melville, American editor, and writer of prose and poetry (born 1858)
- 1925 – Franz Conrad von Hötzendorf, Austrian field marshal (born 1852)
- 1930 – Frankie Campbell, American boxer (born 1904)
- 1931 – Dorothea Fairbridge, South African author and co-founder of Guild of Loyal Women (born 1862)
- 1936 – Juliette Adam, French author (born 1836)
- 1938 – Aleksandr Kuprin, Russian pilot, explorer, and author (born 1870)
- 1939 – Babe Siebert, Canadian ice hockey player and coach (born 1904)
- 1940 – Prince Jean, Duke of Guise (born 1874)
- 1942 – Prince George, Duke of Kent (born 1902)
- 1945 – John Birch, American soldier and missionary (born 1918)
- 1956 – Alfred Kinsey, American biologist and academic (born 1894)
- 1965 – Moonlight Graham, American baseball player and physician (born 1879)
- 1966 – Lao She, Chinese novelist and dramatist (born 1899)
- 1967 – Stanley Bruce, Australian lawyer and politician, 8th Prime Minister of Australia (born 1883)
- 1967 – Oscar Cabalén, Argentine race car driver (born 1928)
- 1967 – Paul Muni, Ukrainian-born American actor (born 1895)
- 1967 – George Lincoln Rockwell, American commander, politician, and activist, founded the American Nazi Party (born 1918)
- 1968 – Stan McCabe, Australian cricketer and coach (born 1910)
- 1969 – Robert Cosgrove, Australian politician, 30th Premier of Tasmania (born 1884)
- 1970 – Tachū Naitō, Japanese architect and engineer, designed the Tokyo Tower (born 1886)
- 1971 – Ted Lewis, American singer and clarinet player (born 1890)
- 1973 – Dezső Pattantyús-Ábrahám, Hungarian lawyer and politician, Prime Minister of Hungary (born 1875)
- 1976 – Eyvind Johnson, Swedish novelist and short story writer, Nobel Prize laureate (born 1900)
- 1977 – Károly Kós, Hungarian architect, ethnologist, and politician (born 1883)
- 1979 – Stan Kenton, American pianist, composer, and bandleader (born 1911)
- 1980 – Gower Champion, American dancer and choreographer (born 1919)
- 1981 – Nassos Kedrakas, Greek actor and cinematographer (born 1915)
- 1982 – Anna German, Polish singer (born 1936)
- 1984 – Truman Capote, American novelist, playwright, and screenwriter (born 1924)
- 1984 – Viktor Chukarin, Ukrainian gymnast and coach (born 1921)
- 1984 – Waite Hoyt, American baseball player and sportscaster (born 1899)
- 1988 – Price Daniel, American politician, 38th Governor of Texas (born 1910)
- 1988 – Art Rooney, American businessman, founded the Pittsburgh Steelers (born 1901)
- 1990 – Morley Callaghan, Canadian author and playwright (born 1903)
- 1995 – Doug Stegmeyer, American bass player and producer (born 1951)
- 1998 – Lewis F. Powell, Jr., American lawyer and Supreme Court justice (born 1907)
- 1999 – Rob Fisher, English keyboard player and songwriter (born 1956)
- 2000 – Carl Barks, American author and illustrator (born 1901)
- 2000 – Frederick C. Bock, American soldier and pilot (born 1918)
- 2000 – Jack Nitzsche, American pianist, composer, and producer (born 1937)
- 2000 – Allen Woody, American bass player and songwriter (born 1955)
- 2001 – Aaliyah, American singer and actress (born 1979)
- 2001 – Carl Brewer, Canadian ice hockey player (born 1938)
- 2001 – Üzeyir Garih, Turkish engineer and businessman, co-founded Alarko Holding (born 1929)
- 2001 – Ken Tyrrell, English race car driver and businessman, founded Tyrrell Racing (born 1924)
- 2002 – Dorothy Hewett, Australian author and poet (born 1923)
- 2003 – Tom Feelings, American author and illustrator (born 1933)
- 2005 – Peter Glotz, Czech-German academic and politician (born 1939)
- 2006 – Noor Hassanali, Trinidadian-Tobagonian lawyer and politician, 2nd President of Trinidad and Tobago (born 1918)
- 2007 – Benjamin Aaron, American lawyer and scholar (born 1915)
- 2007 – Ray Jones, English footballer (born 1988)
- 2008 – Ahmad Faraz, Pakistani poet (born 1931)
- 2008 – Kevin Duckworth, American basketball player (born 1964)
- 2009 – Ted Kennedy, American politician (born 1932)
- 2009 – Mandé Sidibé, Malian economist and politician, Prime Minister of Mali (born 1940)
- 2011 – Lazar Mojsov, Macedonian politician (born 1920)
- 2012 – Florencio Amarilla, Paraguayan footballer, coach, and actor (born 1935)
- 2012 – Neil Armstrong, American pilot, engineer, and astronaut (born 1930)
- 2012 – Roberto González Barrera, Mexican banker and businessman (born 1930)
- 2012 – Donald Gorrie, Scottish politician (born 1933)
- 2013 – Ciril Bergles, Slovene poet and translator (born 1934)
- 2013 – António Borges, Portuguese economist and banker (born 1949)
- 2013 – William Froug, American screenwriter and producer (born 1922)
- 2013 – Liu Fuzhi, Chinese academic and politician, 3rd Minister of Justice for China (born 1917)
- 2013 – Raghunath Panigrahi, Indian singer-songwriter (born 1932)
- 2013 – Gylmar dos Santos Neves, Brazilian footballer (born 1930)
- 2014 – William Greaves, American director and producer (born 1926)
- 2014 – Marcel Masse, Canadian educator and politician, 29th Canadian Minister of National Defence (born 1936)
- 2014 – Nico M. M. Nibbering, Dutch chemist and academic (born 1938)
- 2014 – Uziah Thompson, Jamaican-American drummer and producer (born 1936)
- 2014 – Enrique Zileri, Peruvian journalist and publisher (born 1931)
- 2015 – José María Benegas, Spanish lawyer and politician (born 1948)
- 2015 – Francis Sejersted, Norwegian historian and academic (born 1936)
- 2016 – Marvin Kaplan, American actor (born 1927)
- 2017 – Rich Piana, American bodybuilder (born 1971)
- 2018 – John McCain, American politician (born 1936)
- 2019 – Ferdinand Piëch, Austrian business magnate and engineer (born 1937)
- 2022 – Mable John, American blues vocalist (born 1930)
- 2024 – Salim Al-Huss, Lebanese statesman, 34th Prime Minister of Lebanon (born 1929)
- 2026 – Tim Curry, English actor and singer (born 1946)
- 2026 – Dolly Parton, American singer-songwriter, actress, philanthropist and businesswoman (born 1946)

== Holidays and observances ==
- Christian feast day:
  - Æbbe of Coldingham
  - Aredius
  - Genesius of Arles
  - Genesius of Rome
  - Ginés de la Jara (or Genesius of Cartagena)
  - Gregory of Utrecht
  - Joseph Calasanz
  - Louis IX of France
  - Blessed Ludovicus Baba
  - Blessed Ludovicus Sasada
  - Blessed Luis Sotelo
  - Blessed María del Tránsito Cabanillas
  - Emily de Vialar
  - Menas of Constantinople
  - Blessed Miguel de Carvalho
  - Patricia of Naples
  - Blessed Pedro Vásquez
  - Thomas de Cantilupe (or of Hereford)
  - August 25 (Eastern Orthodox liturgics)
- Day of Songun (North Korea)
- Independence Day, celebrates the independence of Uruguay from Brazil in 1825.
- Soldier's Day (Brazil)
