= Antiochos (strategos of Sicily) =

Byzantine governor of Sicily

Antiochos (Ancient Greek: Ἀντίοχος; fl. c. 766) was a high-ranking Byzantine official and governor of Sicily who participated in a conspiracy against Emperor Constantine V (r. 741–775).

Very little is known about his life and career other than his involvement in the conspiracy against the emperor, which came to light in the summer of 766. According to Theophanes the Confessor, Antiochos was a former logothetes tou dromou and at the time serving as the military governor (strategos) of the theme of Sicily. The conspiracy included nineteen of the highest state officials, including several other strategoi, and was headed by the brothers Strategios and Constantine Podopagouros. After the plot's discovery, the conspirators were publicly paraded and humiliated at the Hippodrome of Constantinople on 25 August 766, following which Strategios and Constantine were beheaded at the Kynegion, while the others were blinded and exiled. Theophanes further reports that once every year, agents were dispatched by the emperor to deliver a hundred lashes to the exiled conspirators.

In his chronicle, Theophanes portrays the conspiracy as part of a reaction against Constantine V's iconoclast policies, stating that some of the conspirators were adherents of the iconophile hermit Stephen the Younger of Mount Auxentios, whom the emperor had had publicly humiliated and executed the previous November. Modern scholarship on the other hand is not as clear as to the motivations of the emperor, i.e. whether the death of Stephen, the execution of the nineteen officials and other acts of persecution was due to his hardening stance against iconophile sentiment, or had political motives as a reaction to plots against his life (in which Stephen too may have been implicated).

== Sources ==
- Brubaker, Leslie; Haldon, John (2011). Byzantium in the Iconoclast Era, c.680–850: A History. Cambridge University Press. ISBN 978-0-521-43093-7.
- Lilie, Ralph-Johannes; Ludwig, Claudia; Pratsch, Thomas; Zielke, Beate (1999). "Antiochos (#513)". Prosopographie der mittelbyzantinischen Zeit: 1. Abteilung (641–867), Band 1: Aaron (# 1) – Georgios (# 2182) (in German). Berlin and Boston: De Gruyter. p. 163. ISBN 978-3-11-015179-4.
- Mango, Cyril; Scott, Roger (1997). The Chronicle of Theophanes Confessor. Byzantine and Near Eastern History, AD 284–813. Oxford, United Kingdom: Oxford University Press. ISBN 0-19-822568-7.
- Prigent, Vivien; Nichanian, Mikaël (2003). "Les stratèges de Sicile. De la naissance du thème au règne de Léon V". Revue des études byzantines (in French). 61: 97–141. doi:10.3406/rebyz.2003.2273.

Unknown Title last held by Sergios	Strategos of Sicily before 766	Unknown Title next held by Elpidios
