= 766 =

Calendar year

766 in various calendars
Gregorian calendar	766; DCCLXVI
Ab urbe condita	1519
Armenian calendar	215; ԹՎ ՄԺԵ
Assyrian calendar	5516
Balinese saka calendar	687–688
Bengali calendar	172–173
Berber calendar	1716
Buddhist calendar	1310
Burmese calendar	128
Byzantine calendar	6274–6275
Chinese calendar	乙巳年 (Wood Snake); 3463 or 3256 — to — 丙午年 (Fire Horse); 3464 or 3257
Coptic calendar	482–483
Discordian calendar	1932
Ethiopian calendar	758–759
Hebrew calendar	4526–4527
- Hindu calendars
Vikram Samvat	822–823
Shaka Samvat	687–688
Kali Yuga	3866–3867
Holocene calendar	10766
Iranian calendar	144–145
Islamic calendar	148–149
Japanese calendar	Tenpyō-jingo 2 (天平神護２年)
Javanese calendar	660–661
Julian calendar	766; DCCLXVI
Korean calendar	3099
Minguo calendar	1146 before ROC 民前1146年
Nanakshahi calendar	−702
Seleucid era	1077/1078 AG
Thai solar calendar	1308–1309
Tibetan calendar	阴木蛇年 (female Wood-Snake); 892 or 511 or −261 — to — 阳火马年 (male Fire-Horse); 893 or 512 or −260

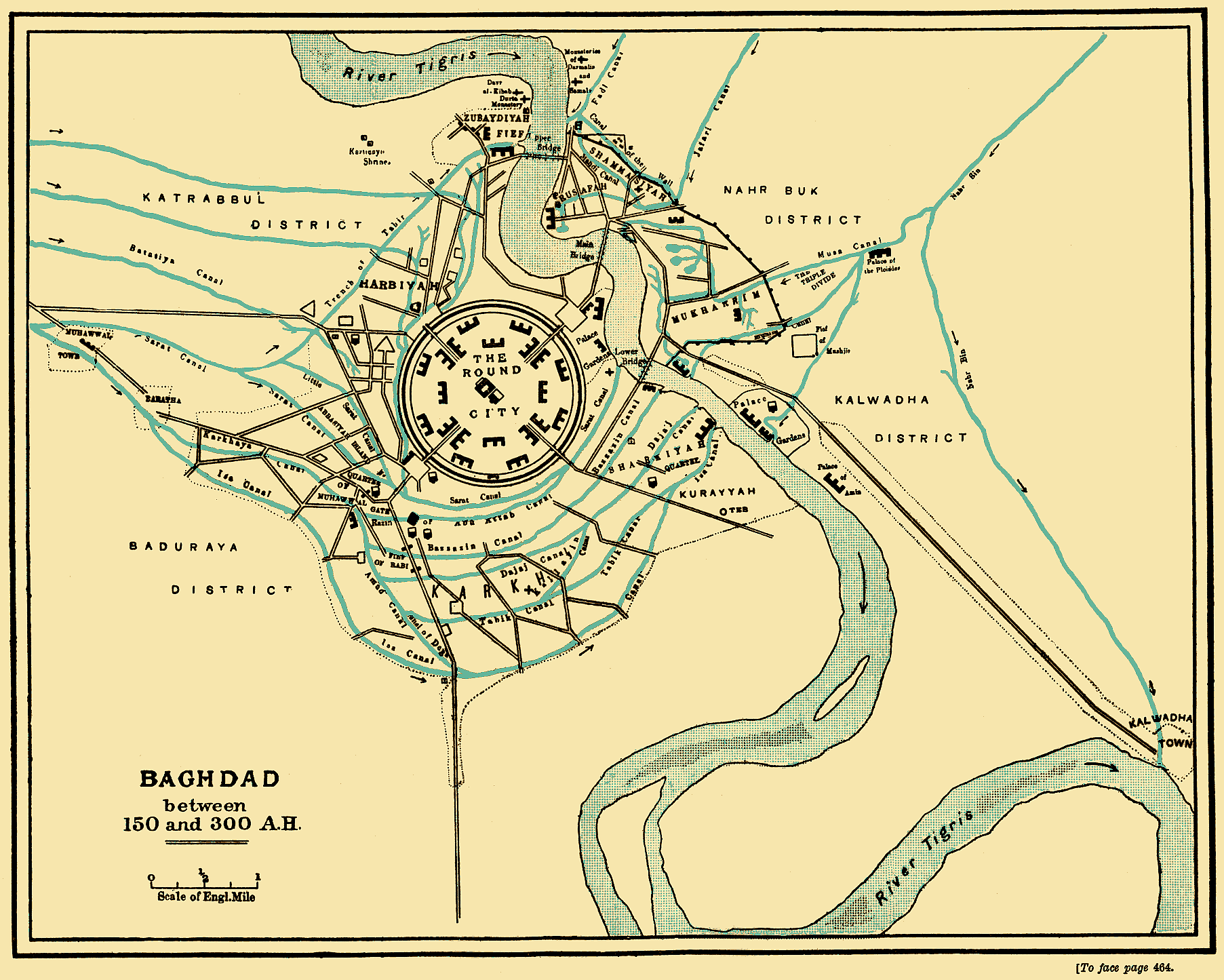
The "Round City" of Baghdad

Year 766 (DCCLXVI) was a common year starting on Wednesday of the Julian calendar, the 766th year of the Common Era (CE) and Anno Domini (AD) designations, the 766th year of the 1st millennium, the 66th year of the 8th century, and the 7th year of the 760s decade. The denomination 766 for this year has been used since the early medieval period, when the Anno Domini calendar era became the prevalent method in Europe for naming years.

== Events ==
=== By place ===
==== Byzantine Empire ====
- August 25 – Emperor Constantine V publicly humiliates 19 high-ranking officials in the Hippodrome of Constantinople, after discovering a plot against him. He executes the leaders, Constantine Podopagouros and his brother Strategios, and blinds and exiles the rest.
- Autumn – Siege of Kamacha: Abbasid forces under al-Hasan ibn Qahtaba are defeated at the fortress city of Kamacha, in eastern Cappadocia (modern Turkey). A Byzantine relief army (12,000 men) forces the Abbasids to retreat into Armenia.
- Sabin, ruler (khagan) of Bulgaria, flees to the Byzantine fortress city of Mesembria, from where he escapes to Constantinople. Constantine V arranges for the transfer of Sabin's family from Bulgaria.

==== Abbasid Caliphate ====
- Baghdad nears completion as up to 100,000 labourers create a circular city about 1 or 2 km in diameter (depending on the source). In the center of the "Round City" is a palace built for Caliph al-Mansur. The capital is ringed by three lines of walls (approximate date).

==== Asia ====
- The Karluks defeat the Turgesh Khaganate in Central Asia. Most of Turkestan (former Onoq territory) falls under Karluk rule, except west of Lake Aral, where the loose confederation of the Oghuz Turks is about to emerge.

=== By topic ===
==== Religion ====
- Summer – Patriarch Constantine II is deposed and jailed, after the discovery of Constantine Podopagouros' plot against Constantine V. Nicetas I is appointed patriarch of Constantinople.
- Metten Abbey, near the town of Deggendorf (Bavaria), is founded by Gamelbert of Michaelsbuch.

== Births ==
- Al-Fadl ibn Yahya al-Barmaki, Muslim governor (d. 808)
- Ali al-Ridha, 8th Shia Imam (d. 818)
- Harun al-Rashid, Muslim caliph (or 763)
- Li Cheng, chancellor of the Tang Dynasty
- Zhang Ji, Chinese scholar and poet (approximate date)

== Deaths ==
- March 6 – Chrodegang, Frankish bishop
- August 25
  - Constantine Podopagouros, Byzantine official
  - Strategios Podopagouros, Byzantine general
- Abdullah al-Aftah, Shī‘ah Imam and Muslim scholar
- Fallomon mac Con Congalt, king of Mide (Ireland)
- Fujiwara no Matate, Japanese nobleman (b. 715)
- Muhammad ibn al-Ash'ath al-Khuza'i, Muslim governor
