= Sicily (theme) =

Byzantine province

Theme of Sicily Σικελία, θέμα Σικελίας
- Theme of the Byzantine Empire
- 687/695–902
- The Byzantine Empire and its themes c. 717
- Capital: Syracuse, then Rhegion
- Historical era: Middle Ages
  - Established: 687/695
  - Fall of Taormina: 902
  - Remnant renamed as the Theme of Calabria: Mid-10th century
Preceded by	Succeeded by
Sicilia (Roman province)	Muslim Sicily; Theme of Calabria
- Today part of: Italy; Malta

Sicily (Greek: θέμα Σικελίας, Thema Sikelias) was a Byzantine province (theme) existing from the late 7th to the 10th century, encompassing the islands of Sicily and Malta, and the region of Calabria in the Italian mainland. Following the Muslim conquest of Sicily, from 902 the theme was limited to Calabria, but retained its original name until the middle of the 10th century.

== History ==
Ever since its reconquest from the Ostrogoths by Belisarius in 535–536, Sicily had formed a distinct province under a praetor, while the army was placed under a dux. A strategos (military governor) is attested on the island in Arab sources between 687 and 695, and it is at that time that the island was probably made into a theme.

The theme was based in Syracuse, traditionally the chief city of Sicily. It comprised not only the island, which was divided into districts called tourmai, but also the mainland duchy of Calabria (Greek: δουκᾶτον Καλαυρίας, doukaton Kalavrias), which extended roughly up to the river Crati. The strategos of Sicily exercised some authority—varying according to the prevailing local political faction—over the autonomous duchies of Naples, Gaeta and Amalfi.

The Muslim conquest of the island began in 826. Following the fall of Syracuse in 878 and the conquest of Taormina in 902, the strategos moved to Rhegion, the capital of Calabria. During the first half of the 10th century, the Byzantines launched a number of failed expeditions to regain the island and maintained a few isolated strongholds near Messina until 965, when Rometta, the last Byzantine outpost, fell. The post of "strategos of Sicily" was thus retained as the official title until the mid-10th century, when the "strategos of Calabria" begins to appear in the lists.

== List of strategoi ==
Holders of the office known only from seals who can not be precisely dated are not included. Uncertain or conjectural entries are denoted in italics.

Name	Tenure	Appointed by	Notes	Refs
Salventius	c. 687–695	Justinian II (?)	Only known through two seals dating to the late 7th century, which give his titles as patrikios and strategos, without geographic qualification. His Latin name points to a Western origin, possibly from the senatorial aristocracy of Rome; as the only Western theme at the time was Sicily, he is held to have been strategos there, probably appointed by Justinian II during his first reign.	
Theophylact	c. 700	Tiberios III	Four seals attest to the existence of a koubikoularios, parakoimomenos, and strategos of Sicily with that name. The dating, as well as the attribution of the seals to the same person, are uncertain, but some scholars (e.g., Vitalien Laurent and Nicolas Oikonomides) identify him with the namesake Exarch of Ravenna, who was appointed in October 701 and came from Sicily. This attribution would also make him the first known parakoimomenos.	
Theodore	c. 710–713	Justinian II	First attested in October 710, when Pope Constantine healed him from an illness. Following the murder of Exarch John III Rizocopus in 711, he was sent to Italy to restore order. He killed or captured the rebels, many of whom were exiled to Constantinople, including Archbishop Felix of Ravenna. He probably remained in charge of the Exarchate until the arrival of a new exarch, Scholasticus, in 713.	
Sergios	717–718	Leo III the Isaurian	The patrikios Sergios was strategos of Sicily in 717, when false news reached the island that Constantinople had fallen to the Umayyads. He then proclaimed one of his aides, Basil Onomagoulos, as emperor. Emperor Leo III quickly sent a new strategos to the island to suppress the inadvertent revolt. Sergius managed to flee to the Lombards, but later secured a pardon and returned to Byzantine territory. Some scholars have proposed an identification with the namesake strategos of 731.	
Paul	718–723 (?)	Leo III the Isaurian	Originally the personal chartoularios of the emperor, he was sent to suppress the revolt of Sergios and Basil Onomagoulos. He is commonly identified as the Paul who became Exarch of Ravenna in 723, and may have remained in office in Sicily until then, but neither is certain. The Exarch Paul was killed during a rebellion in Ravenna in 726/27.	
Sergios	c. 730–735	Leo III the Isaurian	Sometimes identified with the strategos of 717. He was involved in promoting Leo's iconoclast policies with the Pope, as well as implementing his administrative and fiscal reforms, in Sicily and Calabria. He was possibly the Byzantine commander in a naval defeat at the hands of the Umayyads under Ubayd Allah ibn al-Habhab al-Mawsili in 734/35, and may have been the author of a truce concluded in 728.	
Antiochos	c. 760–763 (?)	Constantine V	He was strategos of Sicily, and the chief imperial commander (monostrategos) in Italy, probably in c. 760–763, perhaps as late as 766. He also occupied the post of logothetes tou dromou, unusually in tandem with the post of strategos. He was implicated in a conspiracy of nineteen of the highest state officials, headed by the brothers Strategios and Constantine Podopagouros, against Constantine V. After the plot's discovery, the conspirators were publicly paraded and humiliated at the Hippodrome of Constantinople on 25 August 766, following which Antiochos and most of the other conspirators were blinded and exiled.	
Elpidios	c. 778–780 (?); 781–782	Leo IV the Khazar; Irene of Athens	Appointed as strategos of Sicily in February 781 by Empress-regent Irene of Athens. He is noted to have held the office previously, most likely in the late 770s, so that Irene's appointment may simply have been a reconfirmation. He was soon accused of participating in the abortive conspiracy of the previous October to depose Irene and raise Leo IV's brother Nikephoros to the throne. Irene sent an emissary to Sicily, but the locals refused to hand him over, so that the Empress had to dispatch an expedition against him in 782. Elpidios fled to the Aghlabids, who crowned him Byzantine emperor (basileus).	
Theodore	782–788	Irene of Athens	A eunuch, he was sent by Empress Irene to depose Elpidios. He remained in Sicily as the local strategos and was active in the affairs of Italy. He participated, under the command of the protospatharios and sakellarios John, in the expedition in support of the former King of the Lombards Adelchis, who intended to recover his realm from Charlemagne. The expedition was defeated by the Franks, and Theodore was executed "in cruel fashion".	
Niketas Monomachos	c. 797	Irene of Athens	Born in Paphlagonia, he was castrated as a child. He is attested as strategos of Sicily in 797, when he accompanied Theoktistos in an embassy to Charlemagne. He remained in office until 798/9, when his successor is named. After 811 he became a monk and abbot, and a defender of the veneration of icons during the second period of iconoclasm. He died in 836 and is venerated as a saint.	
Michael Ganglianos	c. 798/9	Irene of Athens	Mentioned in Frankish sources as a former governor of Phrygia (likely strategos of the Anatolic Theme), who led an embassy to the court of Charlemagne along with the presbyter Theophilos in 798. He is equated by some scholars, notably Paul Speck, with the "Michahel Siciliae praefectus" mentioned in the Annales regni Francorum as an envoy to Charlemagne in 799, as well as with the owner of a seal mentioning "Michael, patrikios, praipositos, and strategos of Sicily". If so, the title of praipositos indicates that he was a eunuch.	
Constantine	c. 804/5	Nikephoros I	Constantine is only known from a letter by Pope Leo III from 813, as having concluded a ten-year truce with the Arabs (probably the Aghlabids) in spring 804, which was broken by the latter. He was probably sent to the island soon after the overthrow of Irene in October 802, to replace the governor appointed by her, hence in 803. A number of seals mentioning Constantine, patrikios and strategos of Sicily, are attributed to him, including one found on Cyprus, perhaps linked with the short-lived recovery of the island under Nikephoros I in 805–806.	
Theognostos	c. 812	Michael I Rhangabe	Mentioned as one of the envoys sent in 811/2 by Michael I to Aachen to negotiate peace and arrange a marriage between his son Theophylact and a Frankish princess. Given the frequency with which the strategoi of Sicily were eomployed in such embassies, he may be the owner of an unpublished seal mentioning "Theognostos, patrikios and strategos of Sicily", which on stylistic grounds is to be dated in the early 9th century.	
Gregory	813–821	Leo V the Armenian	Mentioned in two letters by Pope Leo III in August and November 813. He led a fleet to Sicily to help repel an Arab attack, but soon concluded a truce with the Arabs of Ifriqiya. He restored imperial control over the Duchy of Naples, installing his own nominees Theoctistus and Theodore as dukes. After the murder of Leo V in December 820, he did not recognize his successor, Michael II the Amorian, and was assassinated by local aristocrats under Euphemius.	
Constantine Soudas	826	Michael II the Amorian	Appointed by Michael II in 826, Constantine appointed Euphemius as his fleet commander, but was overthrown and executed by the latter, when orders came from Constantinople for his arrest. Facing resistance in the island, Euphemius turned to the Aghlabids for aid. The affair marked the beginning of the Muslim conquest of Sicily.	
Palata or Balata	826–827	Michael II the Amorian	Known only from Arabic sources, his actual name is unknown; Palata may be the corrupted form of a title (perhaps kouropalates). Initially a partisan of Euphemios, he turned against him and evicted him from Syracuse; alternatively he may have been a general sent from Constantinople. When Euphemios returned with Aghlabid troops, Palata, who was the de facto governor of Sicily, was defeated and withdrew to Calabria, where he died.	
Photeinos	c. 826/7 (?)	Michael II the Amorian	As strategos of the Anatolic Theme, he led an expedition to recover Crete from the Saracens but was defeated. He was then appointed to command in Sicily. No details about his activities there are known.	
Constantine Kontomytes	859	Michael III	The patrikios Constantine Kontomytes was a former strategos of the Thracesian Theme and relative by marriage to the Empress Theodora and Patriarch Photios. In 859, Emperor Michael III sent him to Sicily at the head of 300 ships. The Byzantines were defeated by the Arabs under Abbas ibn Fad and forced back onto their ships.	
Eupraxios	c. 880	Basil I the Macedonian	Mentioned only in the chronicle of Symeon the Logothete as governor of Sicily in 880, in connection with the dispatch of reinforcements under Prokopios to southern Italy.	
Barsakios	c. 881	Basil I the Macedonian	Of Armenian origin, the imperial protospatharios and strategos Barsakios was defeated by the Aghlabid commander al-Hasan ibn al-Abbas near Taormina in spring 881 and recalled to Constantinople. Probably identical with the patrikios of the same name who in 894/5 became strategos of Longibardia in southern Italy.	
Polites	c. 884/5	Basil I the Macedonian	Name known only from Arabic sources. Either himself the governor, or, according to Ibn al-Athir, the envoy of the governor, who negotiated a three-month truce and the ransoming of 300 Muslim prisoners, in exchange for Byzantine captives from Syracuse.	
Constantine Karamallos	c. 902	Leo VI the Wise	The patrikios Constantine Karamallos is attested as the commander of Taormina during its siege by the Aghlabids in 902. He escaped its fall with the fleet, and went to Constantinople, where he was tried and condemned to death for negligence. He was pardoned and allowed to retire as a monk. Based on an inscription from Castel Mola, a fort near Taormina, mentioning a "Constantine, patrikios and strategos of Sicily", which stylistically belongs to the same period, he is identified as a strategos.	
Eustathios	c. 914	Constantine VII Porphyrogennetos	An imperial chamberlain (hence a eunuch), who negotiated a peace treaty with Ahmad ibn Qurhub, in exchange for an annual tribute of 22,000 gold coins. His seal carries his titles as "primikerios, imperial protospatharios, and strategos of Sicily"; in reality he was probably the first strategos of Calabria.	

== See also ==
- Exarchate of Ravenna
- History of Islam in southern Italy

== Sources ==
- Brown, Thomas S. (2008). "Byzantine Italy (680–876)". In Sheppard, Jonathan (ed.). The Cambridge History of the Byzantine Empire c. 500–1492. Cambridge: Cambridge University Press. pp. 433–464. ISBN 978-0-521-83231-1.
- Kazhdan, Alexander, ed. (1991). The Oxford Dictionary of Byzantium. Oxford and New York: Oxford University Press. ISBN 0-19-504652-8.
- Lilie, Ralph-Johannes; Ludwig, Claudia; Pratsch, Thomas; Zielke, Beate (2013). Prosopographie der mittelbyzantinischen Zeit Online. Berlin-Brandenburgische Akademie der Wissenschaften. Nach Vorarbeiten F. Winkelmanns erstellt (in German). Berlin and Boston: De Gruyter.
- Nesbitt, John; Oikonomides, Nicolas, eds. (1994). Catalogue of Byzantine Seals at Dumbarton Oaks and in the Fogg Museum of Art, Volume 2: South of the Balkans, the Islands, South of Asia Minor. Vol. 2. Washington, DC: Dumbarton Oaks Research Library and Collection. ISBN 0-88402-226-9.
- Oikonomides, Nicolas (1972). Les listes de préséance byzantines des IXe et Xe siècles (in French). Paris: Editions du Centre National de la Recherche Scientifique.
- Pertusi, A. (1952). Constantino Porfirogenito: De Thematibus (in Italian). Rome: Biblioteca Apostolica Vaticana.
- Prigent, Vivien; Nichanian, Mikaël (2003). "Les stratèges de Sicile. De la naissance du thème au règne de Léon V". Revue des études byzantines (in French). 61: 97–141. doi:10.3406/rebyz.2003.2273.
