= Muhammad ibn al-Fadl =

Muhammad ibn al-Fadl (fl. 9th century) was an Aghlabid Arab military commander who was the emir of Sicily from 882 to 885 and again in 892. He fought against the Byzantine Empire, and was appointed as the governor of the Aghlabid-controlled portion of Sicily after their defeat in the battle of Caltavuturo.

== Wars against the Byzantines in Sicily ==
He assumed the office of governor of Sicily in 882, following the Muslim defeat in the Battle of Caltavuturo and the subsequent deposition of the emir Hasan ibn Abbas.

Muhammad ibn al-Fadl and the two subsequent Sicilian emirs, Husayn ibn Ahmad and Sawada ibn Muhammad ibn Khafāja, were particularly active in relaunching the anti-Byzantine holy war. In the spring of 882 the new governor renewed Hasan's earlier plan of conquest with new raids against the remaining strongholds inhabited by Christians.

He initially moved against Catania, clashing with Byzantine naval forces. He later launched an expedition against Taormina and, on the return, confronted a strong Byzantine army. According to the sources, he killed 3,000 men and sent their heads to Palermo. After the victory he besieged the “City of Kings” (probably Polizzi), capturing it.

Byzantine forces largely withdrew to Calabria, leaving only a few garrisons in Sicily and maintaining control mainly over the cities of Rometta and Taormina.

In 883–884 a major attack was launched against the territory of Rometta, but the citadel managed to resist. Taormina became the centre of new Muslim attacks; however, after a brief period of civil conflict among the members of the governor’s family, the Byzantines managed to repel the assaults and organize counter-offensives.

The Muslim expeditions against Rometta, Taormina and Catania succeeded in obtaining booty or tribute sufficient to pay the army, but failed to capture the main Byzantine fortresses.

Muhammad ibn al-Fadl was replaced in 884/885 by Husayn ibn Ahmad. He returned to the office of governor in 892.
