= Battle of Polizzi =

Battle of Polizzi (882)
- Part of the Muslim conquest of Sicily; Arab–Byzantine wars
- Map of the Arab–Byzantine naval conflict in the Mediterranean, 7th–11th centuries
Date	882
Location	Polizzi Generosa
Result	Aghlabid victory

Belligerents
Aghlabid dynasty	Byzantine Empire

Commanders and leaders
Muhammad ibn al-Fadl	Unknown

Casualties and losses
Unknown	3,000 killed + garrison destroyed

The Battle of Polizzi was a military engagement between the Aghlabids and the Byzantines at the fort at modern-day Polizzi Generosa. The Aghlabids defeated the Byzantines and sacked Polizzi, ending a series of Byzantine victories against the Aghlabids.

== background ==
In the year 880, the Byzantine fleet, by the admiral Nasar, inflicted a defeat on an Aghlabid navy at the Battle of Cephalonia on the coasts of Greece. Afterwards, the Byzantine emperor Basil I ordered Nasar to sail towards Sicily. There the Byzantines landed at Reggio Calabria, defeating any remnants of the Aghlabid fleet. Now masters of the sea, the Byzantines began capturing Muslim merchant ships, seizing large quantities of valuable goods, especially oil. These devastating raids occurred during a year of terrible famine in Africa, which created a high demand for provisions from Sicily.

At the same time, Nasar sent horse bands to ravage territories of cities tributary to the Muslims. For several months, he disrupted trade in the colony without directly attacking it and then moved to the mainland, where conquering territory was easier. He left a squadron of galleys at Termini or Cefalù with soldiers who continued land raids. They began building or fortifying a city, called the City of the Emperor by the Byzantines, believed to be modern Polizzi Generosa, located on a hill in the main valley.

Shortly afterwards, the Byzantines achieved another victory at the Battle of Caltavuturo. An Arab detachment under the command of Abu't-Tawr encountered the Greeks and was entirely exterminated except for seven men. The latest defeat of the Arabs brought about another change in the government of Sicily. Al-Hasan ibn al-‘Abbas was recalled and in his place was appointed Muhammad ibn al-Fadl.

== Battle ==
In the year 882, the new Sicilian governor dispatched several detachments throughout the island. He then marched to the city of Taormina and ravaged the countryside, burning the crops. On his return, he encountered a strong Byzantine army, likely assembled from Sicilian municipalities, standing on a field near Polizzi. The Aghlabids routed the Byzantines, killing three thousand men and capturing many prisoners. The heads of the dead were placed on spikes and sent to Palermo. Capitalizing on this victory, the Aghlabids attacked Polizzi, capturing it by force, massacring the entire garrison, and enslaving the inhabitants.

== Aftermath ==
After the battle, the remnants of Nasar’s victory disappeared. The Byzantine forces, stretched thin by the war in Calabria, abandoned Sicily or left only a few garrisons behind. The Byzantines’ position in Sicily weakened considerably, with nearly all territory lost except for the eastern coast and the plain between the Peloritani Mountains and Mount Etna. However, the Muslims did not launch any decisive operations.

== Sources ==
- Michele Amari (1854), Storia dei Musulmani di Sicilia, Vol I (in Italian).
- Alexander Vasiliev (1968), Byzantium and the Arabs, Vol. 2: Political relations between Byzantines and Arabs during the Macedonian Dynasty (In French).
- Theresa Maggio (2003), The Stone Boudoir. Travels Through the Hidden Villages of Sicily.
