= November 28 (Eastern Orthodox liturgics) =

Day in the Eastern Orthodox liturgical calendar

Eastern Orthodox liturgical calendar
November 27	November 28	November 29
November 28 O.S. ≍ December 11 N.S. November 28 N.S ≍ November 15 O.S.

An Eastern Orthodox cross

November 28 in Eastern Orthodox liturgical calendars is a feast day and a day of commemoration of saints and martyrs. Although some Orthodox churches use the Revised Julian Calendar and others use the traditional Julian calendar, the fixed commemorations for their respective November 28 are broadly the same, no matter which calendar is used. (Note: Despite the dates being the same, the days to which they refer typically differ by 13 days. The notation Old Style or O.S. is sometimes used to indicate a date in the traditional Julian Calendar (the "Old Calendar"). The notation New Style or N.S. indicates a date in the Revised Julian calendar (the "New Calendar").)

== Saints ==
- Hieromartyr Acacius, Martyr Irenarchus and Seven Women-martyrs at Sebaste (303) (Note: Name days celebrated today include: Irenarchos (Εἰρήναρχος).)
- Martyrs at Tiberiopolis (361-363):

- Timothy and Theodore, bishops;
- Peter, John, Sergius, Theodore, and Nicephorus, presbyters;
- Basil and Thomas, deacons;
- Hierotheus, Daniel, Chariton, Socrates, Comasius, and Eusebius, monks;
- Etymasius, layman.

- Saint Theodore, Bishop of Theodosiopolis in Armenia (end of 6th century)
- Saint Maurice, Emperor of Rome, and his six sons (602)
- Venerable Monk-martyr and Confessor Stephen the New of Mt. St. Auxentius (767) (Note: "At Constantinople, in the time of Constantine Copronymus, the holy martyrs Stephen the Younger, Basil, Peter, Andrew and their companions, numbering three hundred and thirty-nine monks, who were subjected to various torments for the worship of holy images, and confirmed the Catholic truth with the shedding of their blood.")

- Martyrs: Basil, Stephen, Gregory, another Gregory, John, Andrew, Peter, Anna, and many others (767)

- Saint Romanos, Bishop of Macedonia (Note: His memory is not recorded in the Synaxarion of St. Nicodemus; nor in that of Delehaye. However his memory is preserved in Parisian Codex 1578, where he is referenced as Bishop of Macedonia.)

== Pre-Schism Western saints ==
- Saint Rufus and Companions, a citizen of Rome who was martyred with his entire household under Diocletian (304) (Note: "AT Rome, St. Rufus, who, with all his family, was made a martyr by Diocletian.")
- Saints Papinianus and Mansuetus, Bishops in North Africa martyred under the Arian Vandal King Genseric (5th century) (Note: "In Africa, under the Arian king Genseric, in the persecution of the Vandals, the holy martyrs Papinian and Mansuetus, bishops, who, for the Catholic faith, were burned in every part of their bodies with hot plates of iron, and thus ended their glorious combat.")
- Saints Valerian, Urban, Crescens, Eustacius Cresconius, Crescentian, Felix, Hortulanus and Florentian, Bishops from North Africa exiled by the Arian King Genseric (5th century) (Note: "At this time also, other holy bishops, Valerian, Urban, Crescens, Eustachius, Cresconius, Crescentian, Felix, Hortulanus, and Florentian, terminated the course of their lives in exile." They reposed in exile and were afterwards honoured as confessors for Orthodoxy.)
- Saint Fionnchu, the successor of St. Comgall at the monastery of Bangor in Ireland (6th century)
- Virgin-Martyr Juthwara of Cornwall (6th or 8th century)
- Saint Oda of Brabant, the Blind Princess of Scotland (c. 726) (see also: October 23)
- Saint Hippolytus, Bishop of Saint-Claude in France (c. 775)

== Post-Schism Orthodox saints ==
- Blessed Theodore III, Archbishop of Rostov (1394) (Note: See: (in Russian) Феодор III (архиепископ Ростовский). Википедии. (Russian Wikipedia).)

=== New martyrs and confessors ===
- New Martyr Christos the Gardener of Albania, at Constantinople (1748)
- New Hieromartyr Seraphim Chichagov, Metropolitan of St. Petersburg (1937)
- New Hieromartyrs Alexis Veselovsky, (Note: See: (in Russian) Веселовский, Алексей Александрович. Википедии. (Russian Wikipedia).) Alexis Smirnov, and Basil Zavgorodnego, Priests (1937)
- New Hieromartyr Raphael Tyupin, Hieromonk of the Zlatoustov Monastery, Moscow (1937)
- New Monkmartyr Vincent Nikolsky of Optina Monastery (1937)
- Virgin-Martyr Anysia Maslanovoy (1937)
- Virgin-Martyr Paraskeva Fedorov (1938)
- New Hieromartyr Nicholas Krylov, Priest (1941) (Note: Also celebrated on the 3rd Sunday of Pascha, the Sunday of the Myrrh-bearing Women. See: (in Russian) Крылов, Николай Васильевич. Википедии. (Russian Wikipedia).)
- Venerable Confessor Hieromonk Arsenie (Boca) of Prislop (1989)

== Other commemorations ==
- Uncovering of the relics (2000) of Venerable Sergius (Srebriansky), Archimandrite, of Tver (1948) (Note: His feast day is on March 23. See: (in Russian) Сергий (Сребрянский). Википедии. (Russian Wikipedia).)

== Icon gallery ==
Martyr Irenarchus at Sebaste.
(Menologion of Basil II, 10th century).

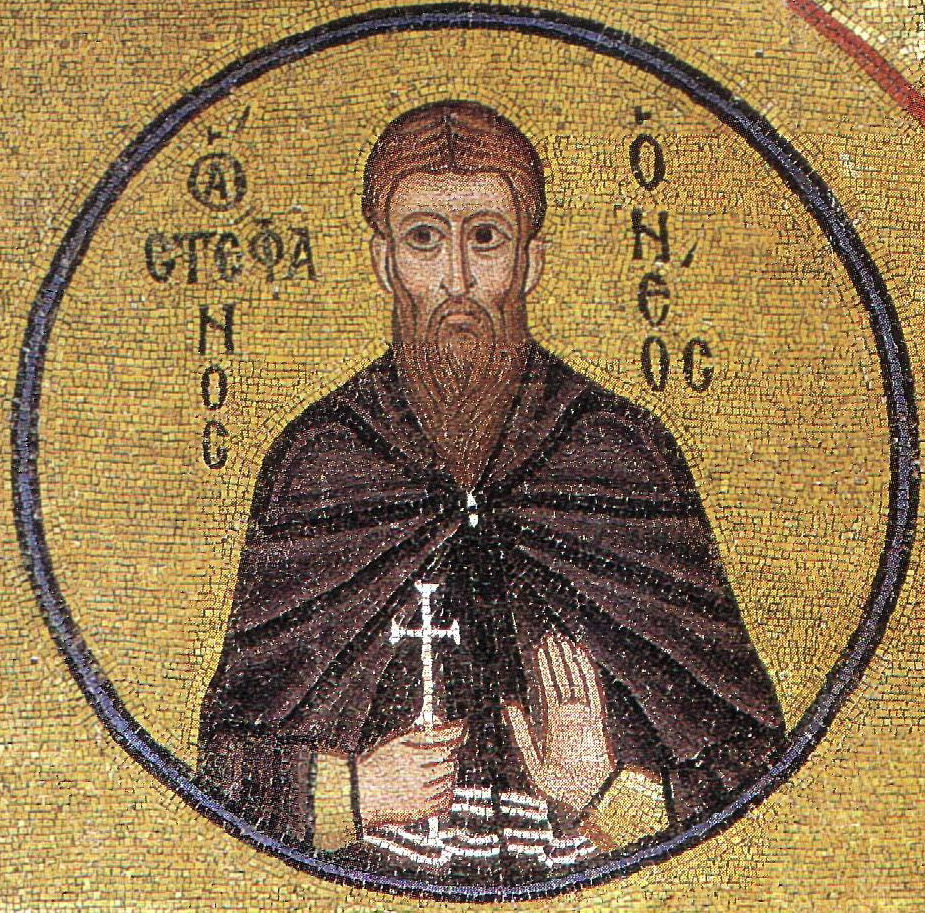
Venerable Monk-martyr and Confessor Stephen the New.

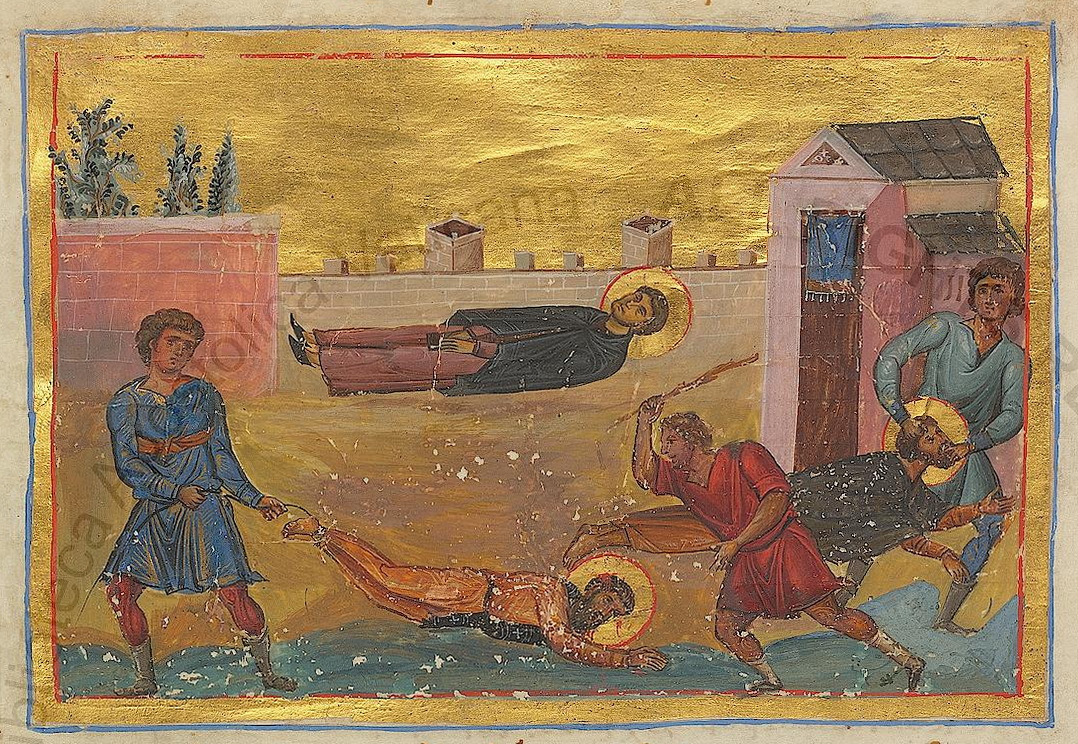
Martyrdom of Monk-martyr and Confessor Stephen the New of Mt. St. Auxentius, and Andrew and Peter.
(Menologion of Basil II, 10th century).

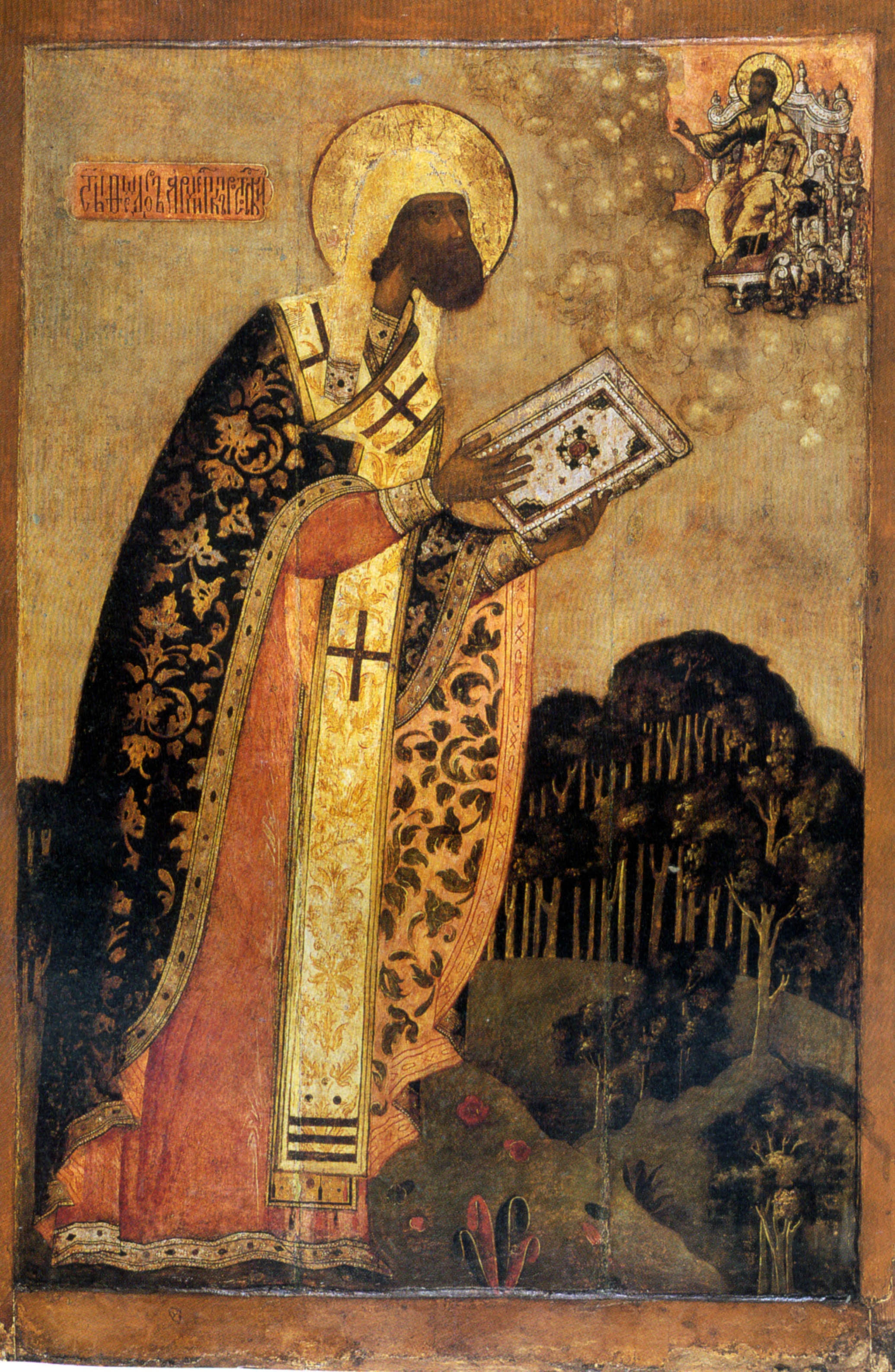
Blessed Theodore, Archbishop of Rostov.

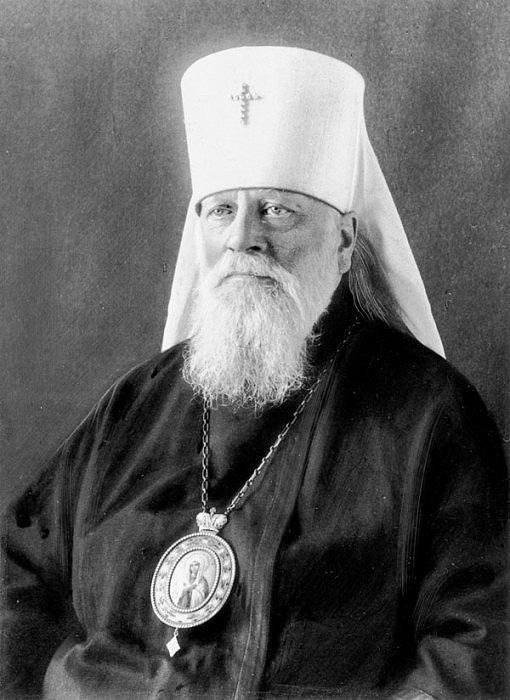
New Hieromartyr Seraphim Chichagov, Metropolitan of St. Petersburg.

New Hieromartyr Nicholas Krylov, Priest.

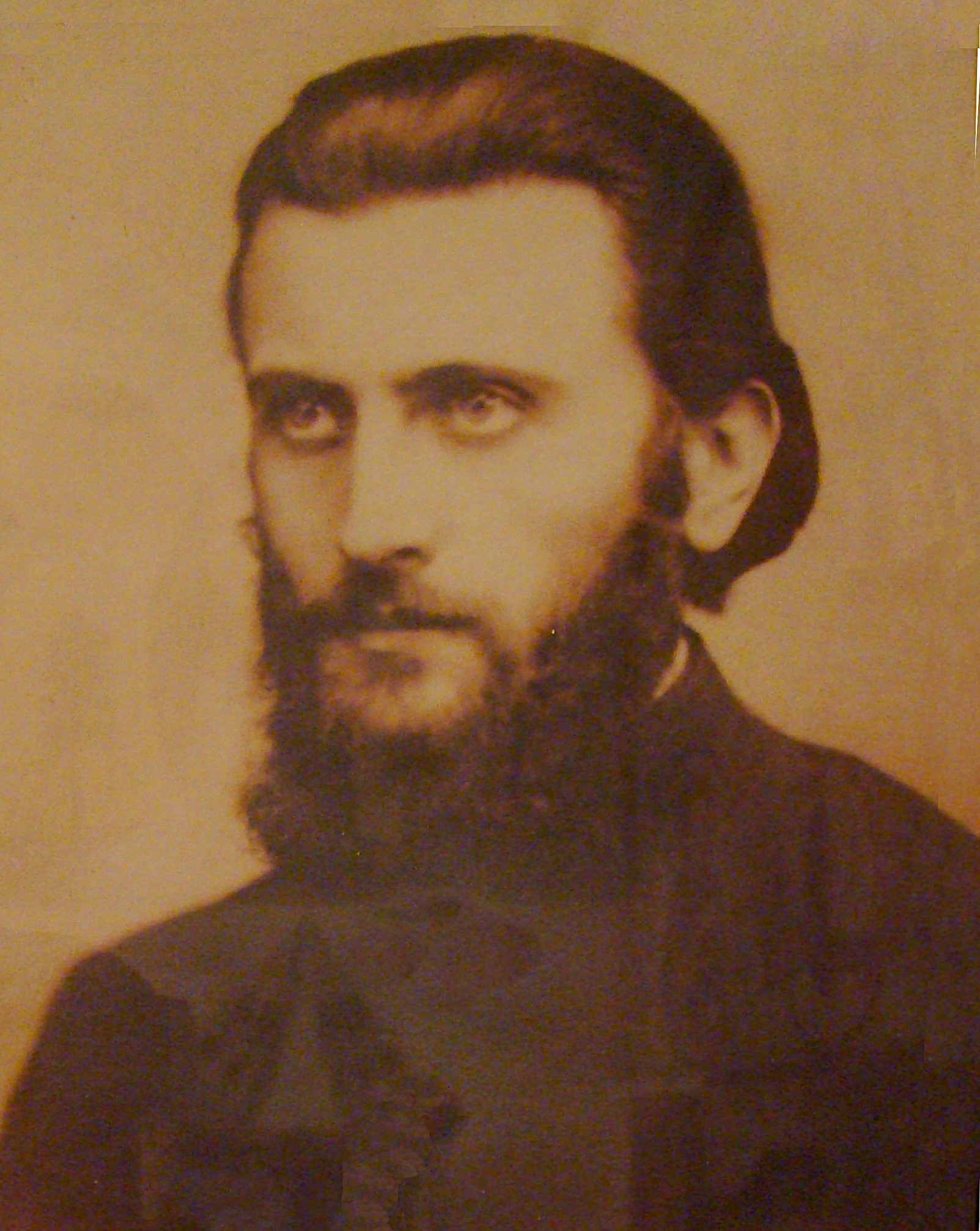
Venerable Confessor Hieromonk Arsenie (Boca) of Prislop.

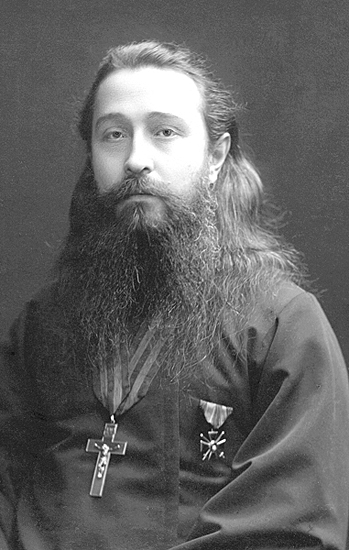
Venerable Sergius (Srebriansky).

== Sources ==
- November 28 / December 11. Orthodox Calendar (PRAVOSLAVIE.RU).
- December 11 / November 28. Holy Trinity Russian Orthodox Church (A parish of the Patriarchate of Moscow).
- November 28. OCA - The Lives of the Saints.
- The Autonomous Orthodox Metropolia of Western Europe and the Americas (ROCOR). St. Hilarion Calendar of Saints for the year of our Lord 2004. St. Hilarion Press (Austin, TX). p. 89.
- The Twenty-Eighth Day of the Month of November. Orthodoxy in China.
- November 28. Latin Saints of the Orthodox Patriarchate of Rome.
- The Roman Martyrology. Transl. by the Archbishop of Baltimore. Last Edition, According to the Copy Printed at Rome in 1914. Revised Edition, with the Imprimatur of His Eminence Cardinal Gibbons. Baltimore: John Murphy Company, 1916. pp. 366-367.
- Rev. Richard Stanton. A Menology of England and Wales, or, Brief Memorials of the Ancient British and English Saints Arranged According to the Calendar, Together with the Martyrs of the 16th and 17th Centuries. London: Burns & Oates, 1892. pp. 568–569.

Greek Sources

- Great Synaxaristes: (in Greek) 28 ΝΟΕΜΒΡΙΟΥ. ΜΕΓΑΣ ΣΥΝΑΞΑΡΙΣΤΗΣ.
- (in Greek) Συναξαριστής. 28 Νοεμβρίου. ECCLESIA.GR. (H ΕΚΚΛΗΣΙΑ ΤΗΣ ΕΛΛΑΔΟΣ).
- (in Greek) November 28. Ορθόδοξος Συναξαριστής.

Russian Sources

- (in Russian) 11 декабря (28 ноября). Православная Энциклопедия под редакцией Патриарха Московского и всея Руси Кирилла (электронная версия). (Orthodox Encyclopedia - Pravenc.ru).
- (in Russian) 28 ноября по старому стилю / 11 декабря по новому стилю. Русская Православная Церковь - Православный церковный календарь на 2018 год.
