= Paulus IV =

Paulus IV may refer to:

- Patriarch Paul IV of Constantinople (ruled 780 to 784)
- Pope Paul IV (1476–1559)
