= María del Tránsito Cabanillas =

Argentine Franciscan tertiary

Blessed María del Tránsito Cabanillas TOSF
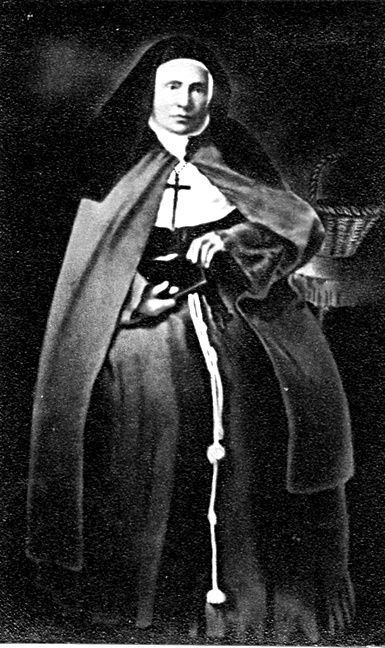
- Cabanillas in 1880
- Born: 15 August 1821; Córdoba, Argentina
- Died: 25 August 1885 (aged 64); San Vicente, Córdoba, Argentina
- Venerated in: Roman Catholic Church
- Beatified: 14 April 2002, Saint Peter's Square, Vatican City by Pope John Paul II
- Feast: 25 August

María del Tránsito Cabanillas (15 August 1821 – 25 August 1885) was an Argentine Roman Catholic Franciscan tertiary and the founder of the Franciscan Tertiary Missionary Sisters. Upon her solemn profession she assumed the religious name María del Tránsito de Jesús Sacramentado. Cabanillas was beatified on 14 April 2002.

== Life ==
María del Tránsito Cabanillas was born in Argentina on the Feast of the Assumption in 1821 as the third of ten children born to Felipe Cabanillas and Francisca Antonia Luján Sánchez. Three children died in childhood while one of her brothers became a priest and three sisters became nuns. The rest married in adulthood. Her father was descended from those hailing from Valencia in Spain and emigrated to Argentina in the second half of the eighteenth century. Her parents married in 1816. She received her baptism in the chapel of San Rocco from Fr. Mariano Aguilar on 10 January 1822. She received confirmation on 4 April 1836.

Cabanillas received her initial education at home and proceeded to complete her studies in Córdoba. It was there that she cared for her seminarian brother until his ordination in 1853. The death of her father in 1850 prompted his widow and her children to move elsewhere in the town close to the church of San Roque. She aided her mother in home duties and care of her siblings. Cabanillas also worked as a catechist and she visited the poor and ill.

The death of her mother on 13 April 1858 prompted her to consider her religious vocation. It hastened her resolve to join the Third Order of Saint Francis at the age of 37. She was professed into that order in 1859.

In 1871 she met Isidora Ponce de León who was in the middle of establishing a Discalced Carmelite convent in the capital of Buenos Aires. In 1872 Maria moved to Buenos Aires and entered the convent on 19 March 1873; she was forced to leave in April 1874 due to ill health. The following September she entered the convent of the Sisters of the Visitation in Montevideo in Uruguay but left a few months later due to a resurgence of health issues.

Cabanillas decided to establish an institute that would focus on education and pastoral assistance to the poor and orphaned. Fellow Franciscans encouraged her in this while the priest Agustin Garzón offered her a house to set up in and also promised her his assistance and contacts that could serve to expedite matters while providing additional expertise. She obtained approval for her project on 8 December 1878. She founded the congregation with her companions Teresa Fronteras and Brigida Moyano, while the Franciscan Quirico Porecca served as its director. The three made their vows on 2 February 1879 while the congregation was aggregated to the Franciscans on 28 January 1880.

Cabanillas died on 25 August 1885 due to her ill health.

== Beatification ==
The beatification process commenced in 1969 – under Pope Paul VI – in an informative process that concluded in 1974. The beginning of the informative process granted the late religious the title of Servant of God. The second process opened in Santiago de Chile in 1970 and closed not long after. Both processes were validated in Rome on 13 November 1987. On 28 June 1999 Maria was proclaimed as venerable as Pope John Paul II acknowledged her life of heroic virtue. The miracle needed for beatification was validated in Rome on 9 October 1998. The pope approved it in 2001 and beatified her in Saint Peter's Square on 14 April 2002. The postulator assigned to the cause is Giovangiuseppe Califano.
