= Allyre Sirois =

Saskatchewan Queen's Bench judge (1923–2012)

- Born: 25 August 1923; Vonda, Saskatchewan, Canada
- Died: 8 September 2012 (aged 89); Saskatoon, Saskatchewan, Canada
- Military career
- Allegiance: Canada
- Branch: Canadian Army
- Unit: Special Operations Executive (F section)
- Awards: MBE, Croix de Guerre
- Other work: Judge of the Court of Queen's Bench for Saskatchewan

Allyre Louis Joseph Sirois (25 August 1923 – 8 September 2012) was a Canadian fransaskois judge of the Court of the Queen's Bench in Saskatchewan, Canada.

== Early life ==
Sirois was born and raised in Vonda, Saskatchewan during his elementary-school years. His parents were Paul Emile Sirois and Bertha Pion Sirois. He was educated in several secondary schools, and then enrolled in the Radio College of Canada in Toronto (1940–1941).

== Wartime experience in occupied France ==
In 1941 Sirois responded to the call to aid Great Britain in World War II by enrolling in the Canadian Army. Years later, he recalled that he thought it was his duty to do something against Nazism. He was initially assigned to the Signal Corps. In 1943 he was loaned to the War Office (MI5) for espionage duty in Occupied France, primarily owing to his fluency in French.

Assigned as an agent in Special Operations Executive's F section, in the spring of 1944 Sirois was sent to Toulouse in occupied France as a radio operator under the codename Gustave. Operating in a three-man cell from Angoulême, he organized twenty-four arms drops and the bombing of Angoulême.

Sirois had a narrow escape when another Allied officer was caught by the Germans and turned informant, leading to the arrest of the other two members of the cell. Warned by the girlfriend of one of the arrested members of his unit, Sirois radioed to London that they had a traitor. He later recalled: "They said do what you have to do. In occupied territory, that's the law of the gun. I had him done away with."

On another occasion, Sirois and another member of the Resistance narrowly escaped being caught at night by a German patrol. Hiding behind a hedgerow, they heard the patrol open fire with machine guns, but in the darkness their aim was off. Sirois and the other agent were unharmed.

His time in France came to an end in August 1944 when southern France was liberated. He managed to make it to Paris for the liberation celebrations, before returning to Saskatchewan shortly before Christmas 1944.

== Education and legal career ==
=== Bar and Bench ===
Back in Saskatchewan, Sirois enrolled in the University of Saskatchewan. He graduated with a Bachelor of Arts in 1948 and Bachelor of Laws in 1950. Called to the bar in 1951, he practised as a lawyer in Gravelbourg, Saskatchewan from 1951 until 1964, when he was appointed to the Bench.

=== Professional controversy ===
In September 1996, the Saskatchewan Minister of Justice asked the Canadian Judicial Council to investigate remarks made by Sirois during a bail hearing for a man accused of beating his girlfriend because she failed to get up and hand him the TV remote. Sirois was reported to have remarked that "it takes two to tango", which appeared to partially blame the victim of the alleged assault. He was also criticized in The Globe and Mail for having referred to prostitutes as belonging to "a different caste", and for saying to a female who had been assaulted when she was 12 years old that she bore some responsibility for the incident.

=== Retirement ===
Sirois retired from the Bench in 1998, upon reaching the mandatory retirement age of 75. He lived in Saskatoon after retiring, dying there in 2012.

== Personal life ==
Sirois married Madeline Anne Marie Ehman on 14 September 1948; she preceded him in death. During their marriage they had six children: Valerie, Richard, Guy, Marianne, Lisa and Norman.

Sirois was active in the community. He was president of the Gravelbourg School Board for 10 years (1953–1963), president of the Association Culturelle Franco-Canadienne, the national network of French-language theatres (1963–1963), served as fundraising co-chair of the La Troupe du Jour, a Saskatoon francophone theatre group, to erect a performing studio, and served on several other municipal boards.

== Honours ==
For his service behind the lines in World War II, Sirois received three distinguished honors:

- UK : member of the Order of the British Empire (MBE)
- France : Croix de Guerre 1939-1945 (CG) with palms.
- Town of Angoulême : Medal and honorary diploma of the town of Angoulême
