= Sille Lundquist =

Danish fashion model and author (1970–2018)

- Born: 25 August 1970; Denmark
- Died: 21 January 2018 (aged 47); Copenhagen, Denmark
- Education: University of Copenhagen
- Occupations: Author; supermodel

Sille Kornum Lundquist (25 August 1970 – 21 January 2018) was a Danish model and author. From the late 1980s until the late 1990s, she made appearances throughout the fashion world in both North America and Europe, and made appearances in both music videos, TV, and film.

== Career ==
Lundquist's career began in the late 1980s after taking part in a modelling competition in her native Denmark, which later took her to Los Angeles to compete in an international competition. After completing her HF in Denmark, she moved to begin a professional career. During her career, she modelled for several brands including Triumph International and Nivea, while appearing in magazines such as British Elle and French Glamour. She made appearances in music videos for Michael Jackson, and in 1997 made an appearance as a dancer in one of the opening scenes of the James Bond film, Tomorrow Never Dies.

After living in New York, Lundquist moved back to Denmark to begin her studies in philosophy at the University of Copenhagen in 1995. She later attributed her interest in philosophy due to the curiosity of people, which was influenced by her career allowing her to meet many different people. She earned her bachelor's degree from the university, which led to her opening her own company Being Human in 2016.

Lundquist released a book in 2010 alongside her work colleague Pernille Hippe Brun.

== Personal life ==
Lundquist was the daughter of Lita Lundquist, a Danish linguist, professor emerita, and Knight of the Order of Dannebrog. She grew up on a farmhouse with her brother and mother, following her parents' divorce. Her aunt, Bente Lundquist, was also a model. Lundquist married her long-time partner Nikolaj Kornum in 2014, and the couple had two daughters together.

On 21 January 2018, it was announced by Lundquist's daughter Anouska on Facebook that Sille had died. While her cause of death was not disclosed publicly, some publications noted that she had been posting publicly on Instagram about undergoing chemotherapy for breast cancer.
