= Paul IV of Constantinople =

Ecumenical Patriarch of Constantinople from 780 to 784

Saint Paul IV of Constantinople
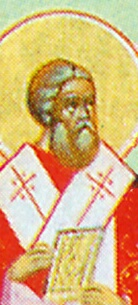
- Patriarch Paul IV of Constantinople

Ecumenical Patriarch of Constantinople
- Born: Cyprus
- Died: December 784; Constantinople
- Venerated in: Eastern Orthodox Church, Catholic Church
- Feast: 30 August

Saint Paul IV of Constantinople
- Ecumenical Patriarch of Constantinople
- Installed: 20 February 780
- Term ended: 31 August 784
- Predecessor: Nicetas I of Constantinople
- Successor: Tarasios of Constantinople

Personal details
- Died: December 784
- Denomination: Chalcedonian Christianity

Paul IV of Constantinople, known as Paul the New (Greek: Παῦλος; died December 784), was Ecumenical Patriarch of Constantinople from 780 to 784. He had once opposed the veneration of icons but urged the calling of an ecumenical council to address the iconoclast controversy. Later, he resigned and retired to a monastery due to old age and illness. He was succeeded by Tarasios of Constantinople, who was a lay administrator at the time.

Paul IV is venerated as a saint in the Eastern Orthodox Church, and his feast day is celebrated on 30 August.

== Notes and references ==
Titles of Chalcedonian Christianity
Preceded by Nicetas I	Patriarch of Constantinople; 780 – 784	Succeeded by Tarasios
