= Strategios Podopagouros =

Byzantine officer executed for his plot to assassinate Emperor Constantine V in 766

Strategios Podopagouros (Ancient Greek: Στρατήγιος Ποδοπάγουρος; died 25 August 766) was a Byzantine military commander, and with his brother Constantine, the leader of a conspiracy against Emperor Constantine V (r. 741–775).

"Podopagouros" is a sobriquet that means "crabfoot". Very little is known about his life and career other than his involvement in the conspiracy against the emperor, which came to light in the summer of 766. According to Theophanes the Confessor, Strategios was then spatharios and commander (domestikos) of the tagma (guard regiment) of the Exkoubitores. Strategios and his brother, who at the time held the high post of logothetes tou dromou, were the leaders of the conspiracy which, according to Theophanes, included nineteen high-ranking officials in total, including several senior provincial governors (strategoi). After the plot's discovery, the conspirators were publicly paraded and humiliated at the Hippodrome of Constantinople on 25 August 766, following which Strategios and Constantine were beheaded at the Kynegion, while the others were blinded and exiled. A few days later, the Eparch of the City Prokopios was also dismissed, followed by the deposition and exile of Patriarch Constantine II, after he was implicated by some clergymen in the conspiracy.

In his chronicle, Theophanes portrays the conspiracy as part of a reaction against Constantine V's iconoclast policies, stating that some of the conspirators were adherents of the iconophile hermit Stephen the Younger of Mount Auxentios, whom the emperor had had publicly humiliated and executed the previous November. Modern scholarship on the other hand is not as clear as to the motivations of the emperor, i.e. whether the death of Stephen, the execution of the nineteen officials and other acts of persecution was due to his hardening stance against iconophile sentiment, or had political motives as a reaction to plots against his life (in which Stephen too may have been implicated).

== Sources ==
- Brubaker, Leslie; Haldon, John (2011). Byzantium in the Iconoclast Era, c.680–850: A History. Cambridge University Press. ISBN 978-0-521-43093-7.
- Mango, Cyril; Scott, Roger (1997). The Chronicle of Theophanes Confessor. Byzantine and Near Eastern History, AD 284–813. Oxford, United Kingdom: Oxford University Press. ISBN 0-19-822568-7.
- Lilie, Ralph-Johannes; Ludwig, Claudia; Pratsch, Thomas; Zielke, Beate (2001). "Strategios Podopaguros (#7130)". Prosopographie der mittelbyzantinischen Zeit: 1. Abteilung (641–867), Band 4: Platon (# 6266) – Theophylaktos (# 8345) (in German). Berlin and Boston: De Gruyter. p. 273. ISBN 978-3-11-016674-3.
