= Nicetas I of Constantinople =

Ecumenical Patriarch of Constantinople from 766 to 780

- Ecumenical Patriarch of Constantinople
- Installed: 16 November 766
- Term ended: 6 February 780
- Predecessor: Constantine II of Constantinople
- Successor: Paul IV of Constantinople

Personal details
- Died: 6 February 780
- Denomination: Chalcedonian Christianity

Nicetas I of Constantinople (or Niketas; Greek: Νικήτας; died 6 February 780) was the Ecumenical Patriarch of Constantinople from 766 to 780. He was of Slavic ancestry and he was a eunuch.

He was chosen by the Emperor Constantine V as a successor of the Patriarch Constantine II of Constantinople. However, Nicetas I was quite unpopular in Constantinople because he was a supporter of iconoclasm. After his death in 780, Nicetas I was declared a heretic. He was succeeded by Paul IV of Constantinople.

== Notes and references ==
Titles of Chalcedonian Christianity
Preceded by Constantine II	Ecumenical Patriarchs of Constantinople; 766 – 780	Succeeded by Paul IV
