= Battle of Caltavuturo =

Battle Between Byzantium and Umayyad Caliphate

Coordinates: 37.844°N 15.318°E

The Battle of Caltavuturo was fought in 881 or 882 between the Byzantine Empire and the Aghlabid emirate of Ifriqiya, during the Muslim conquest of Sicily. It was a major Byzantine victory, although it could not reverse the Muslim conquest of Sicily.

In 880, a succession of naval successes under the admiral Nasar allowed the Byzantine emperor Basil I to envisage a counter-offensive against the Aghlabid dynasty in southern Italy and Sicily. In Sicily, however, the Aghlabids still held the upper hand: in spring 881, the Aghlabid governor al-Hasan ibn al-Abbas raided the remaining Byzantine territories and in the process defeated the local commander, Barsakios, near Taormina.

In the next year, however, AH 268 (881/2 CE), according to the Ibn al-Athir (The Complete History, VII.370.5–7), the Byzantines had their revanche, defeating an Aghlabid army under Abu Thawr so completely that reportedly only seven men survived. The victorious Byzantine commander is identified by modern historians with Mosilikes, who is known to have served in the area in the early 880s. According to the hagiography of the Patriarch of Constantinople Ignatios, the general invoked the patriarch during the battle, and he appeared on a white horse in the air before him, advising him to launch his attack towards the right. Mosilikes followed the advice, and won. The battle gave its name to the locality: the 12th-century geographer Muhammad al-Idrisi records the Qalʿat Abī Thawr ("Castle of Abū Ṯhawr"), which is the origin of the modern name Caltavuturo.

Over the next years, the Muslims launched several raids against Catania, Taormina, and "the king's city" (possibly Polizzi) in 883, against Rometta and Catania in 884, and again against Catania and Taormina in 885. These expeditions were successful in so far as they yielded sufficient booty or tribute to pay the army, but failed to capture any Byzantine strongholds.

This was the last defeat of the Arabs and it brought about changes in the government of Sicily and Al-Hasan Abbas was recalled and in his place was Mohamed al-Fall. Detachments were sent throughout Sicily and defeated the Greeks.

== Sources ==
- Amari, Michele (1854), Storia dei Musulmani di Sicilia (in Italian), vol. I, Florence
- Lilie, Ralph-Johannes; Ludwig, Claudia; Pratsch, Thomas; Zielke, Beate (2013). Prosopographie der mittelbyzantinischen Zeit Online. Berlin-Brandenburgische Akademie der Wissenschaften. Nach Vorarbeiten F. Winkelmanns erstellt (in German). Berlin and Boston: De Gruyter.
- Metcalfe, Alex (2009). The Muslims of Medieval Italy. Edinburgh: Edinburgh University Press. ISBN 978-0-7486-2008-1.
- Talbi, Mohamed (1966), L'émirat aghlabide (184–296/800–909): Histoire politique (in French), Paris: Adrien-Maisonneuve
- Vasiliev, Alexander A. (1968). Byzance et les Arabes, Tome II: Les relations politiques de Byzance et des Arabes à l'époque de la dynastie macédonienne (les empereurs Basile I, Léon le Sage et Constantin VII Porphyrogénète) 867-959 (253-348). Première partie: Les relations politiques de Byzance et des Arabes à l'époque de la dynastie macédonienne. Première période, de 867 à 959. Corpus Bruxellense Historiae Byzantinae (in French). French ed.: Henri Grégoire, Marius Canard. Brussels: Fondation Byzantine. OCLC 1070617015.
