= Constantine II of Constantinople =

Ecumenical Patriarch of Constantinople from 754 to 766

- Ecumenical Patriarch of Constantinople
- Installed: 8 August 754
- Term ended: 30 August 766
- Predecessor: Anastasius of Constantinople
- Successor: Nicetas I of Constantinople

Personal details
- Died: 7 October 767
- Denomination: Chalcedonian Christianity

Constantine II of Constantinople (Greek: Κωνσταντῖνος, Kōnstantinos; died 7 October 767) was the Ecumenical Patriarch of Constantinople from 754 to 766. He had been ecumenically proceeded by Patriarch Anastasius of Constantinople. He was a supporter of the first phase of Byzantine Iconoclasm and devoutly opposed to the creation of images, but he was deposed and jailed after the discovery of Constantine Podopagouros' plot against the Emperor Constantine V in June 766, in which the patriarch was later implicated.

On 7 October 767, Constantine II was paraded through the Hippodrome of Constantinople and finally beheaded. He was succeeded by Nicetas I of Constantinople.

Titles of Chalcedonian Christianity
Preceded by Anastasius	Ecumenical Patriarchs of Constantinople; 754 – 766	Succeeded by Nicetas I
