= Al-Hasan ibn al-Abbas =

- Military career
- Allegiance: Aghlabid
- Rank: Commander

Al-Ḥasan ibn al-ʿAbbās (Arabic: الحسن بن العباس) was an Aghlabid military commander who fought in Sicily against the Byzantine Empire.

He was appointed as the governor (ṣāḥib Ṣiqilliya) of the Aghlabid-controlled portion of Sicily in late 880, succeeding al-Husayn ibn Rabah. The Byzantines had regained confidence in the previous year, following a series of naval victories by the admiral Nasar (at Cephalonia and Stelai), encouraging Emperor Basil I the Macedonian to envisage a counteroffensive to drive the Arabs from Sicily as well as southern Italy.

In spring 881 Hasan launched a series of raids against the remaining Byzantine positions in eastern Sicily. He himself led the main force to ravage the environs of Catania, and then towards Taormina. The local Byzantine commander, Barsakios, tried to stop him, but was defeated and forced to retreat to the safety of the city's walls. Later in 881 or early 882, however, the Byzantines under Mosilikes scored a major victory over an Arab army under Abu Thawr at the Battle of Caltavuturo, Hasan was dismissed from his post.

== Sources ==
- Lilie, Ralph-Johannes; Ludwig, Claudia; Pratsch, Thomas; Zielke, Beate (2013). Prosopographie der mittelbyzantinischen Zeit Online. Berlin-Brandenburgische Akademie der Wissenschaften. Nach Vorarbeiten F. Winkelmanns erstellt (in German). Berlin and Boston: De Gruyter.
- Talbi, Mohamed (1966), L'émirat aghlabide (184–296/800–909): Histoire politique (in French), Paris: Adrien-Maisonneuve
