= Stephen the Younger =

Byzantine monk from Constantinople

Saint Stephen the Younger
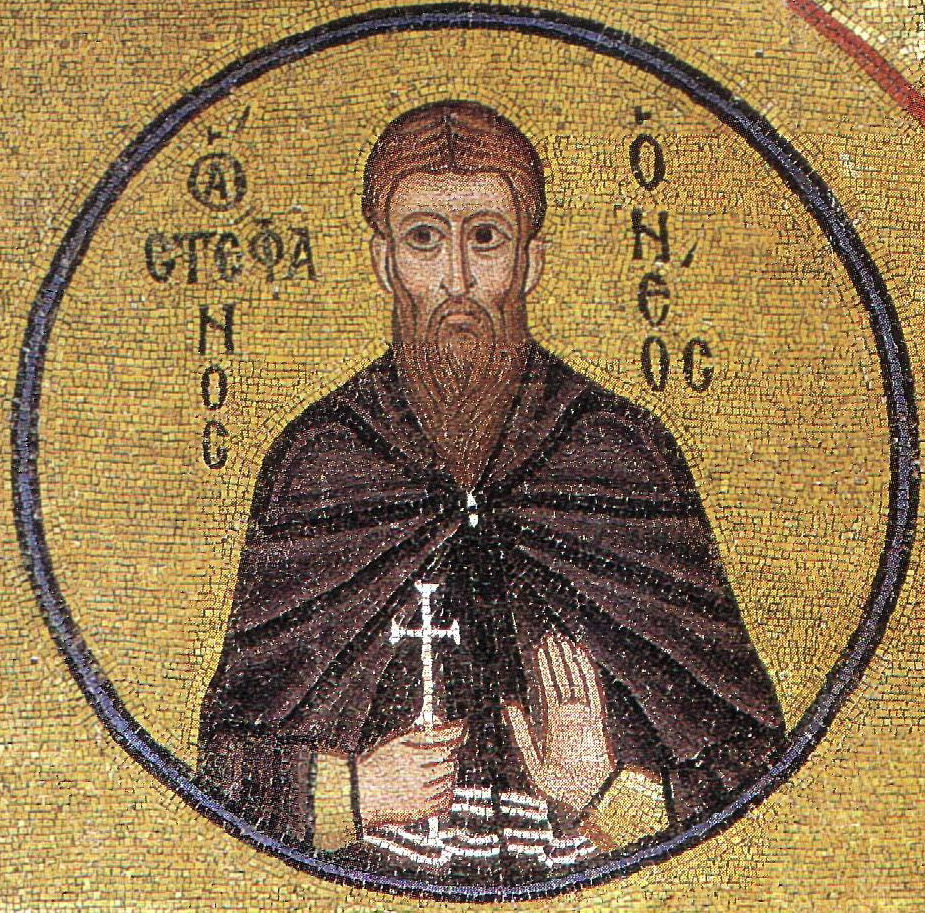
- Mosaic of Stephen in Hosios Loukas monastery, Greece

Confessor; Defender of the Icons
- Born: c. 715; Constantinople, Byzantine Empire
- Died: November 28, 764; Constantinople, Byzantine Empire
- Venerated in: Eastern Orthodox Church; Catholic Church
- Canonized: Pre-congregation
- Feast: 28 November
- Attributes: Monk's habit, holding a cross

Saint Stephen the Younger (Greek: Ἂγιος Στέφανος ὁ νέος, Hagios Stephanos ho neos; 713 or 715 – 28 November 764 or 765) was a Byzantine monk from Constantinople who became one of the leading opponents of the iconoclastic policies of Emperor Constantine V (r. 741–775). He was executed in 764 and became the most prominent iconodule martyr. His feast day is celebrated annually on 28 November. His hagiography, the Life of St. Stephen the Younger, is an important historical source.

== Biography ==
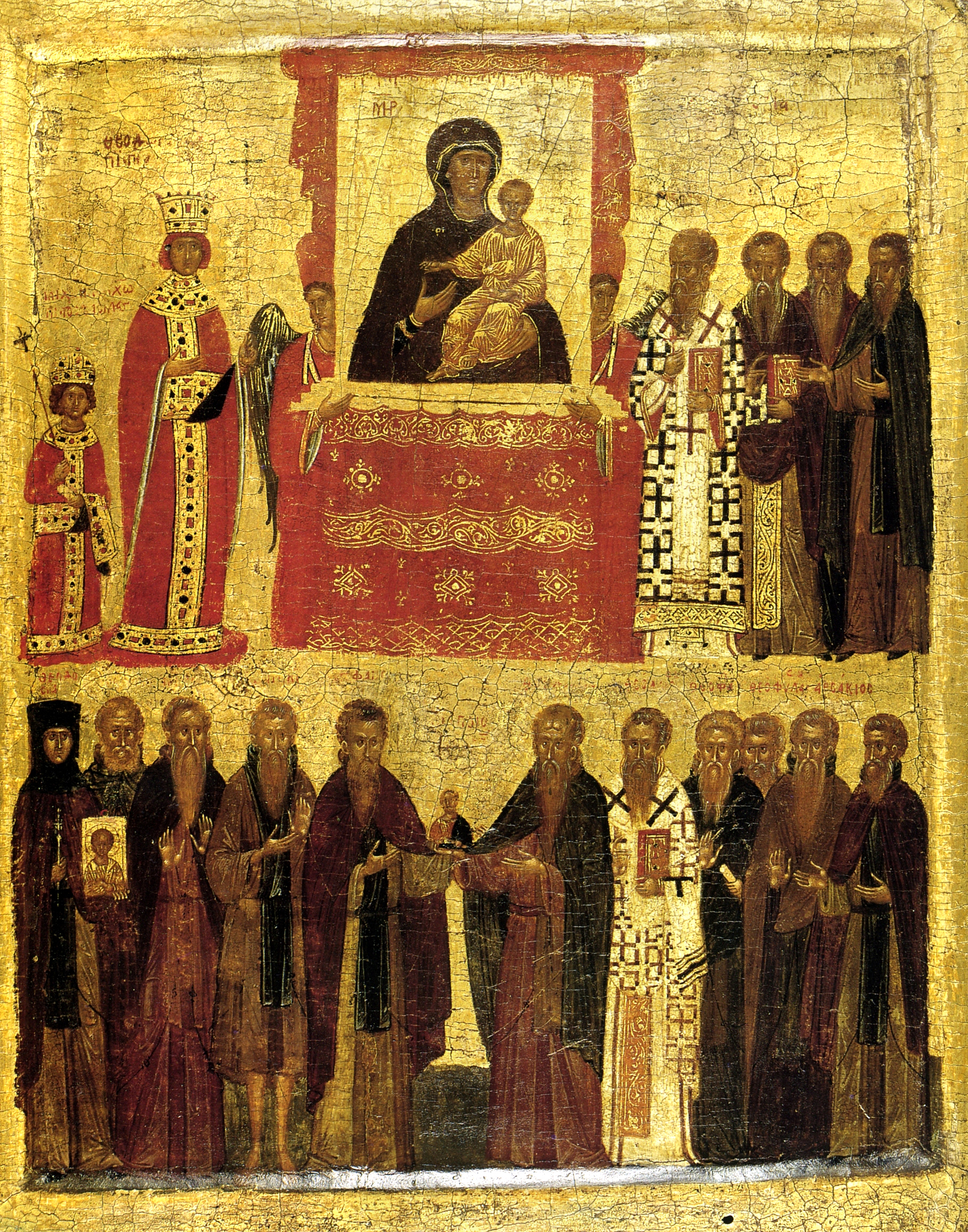
Byzantine icon (14th–15th centuries) celebrating the definite restoration of the veneration of images in 843 (the "Triumph of Orthodoxy"). Stephen the Younger is included among the iconodule martyrs who are presented as witnesses to the event.

Stephen was born in Constantinople in 713 or, according to the Life, shortly after 11 August 715. His father, Gregory, was a craftsman. His mother was called Anna, and he had two older sisters, Theodote and an unnamed one. On Holy Saturday 716, he was baptised in the Hagia Sophia by Patriarch Germanus I. In his sixteenth year (circa 731), he was brought by his parents to Mt. Auxentius in Bithynia, where he became a monk. He visited Constantinople again for his father's funeral some years later and brought his mother and sisters to the convent of Mt. Auxentius. In his 31st year (743 or 746), his mentor, John, died, and Stephen succeeded him, founding a monastery. In his 42nd year (754 or 757), he retired as a hermit in a cave. He refused to accept the decisions of the iconoclast Council of Hieria (754), but it was not until circa 760 that he began suffering persecution: he was accused of sexual relations with his mother, and of illegally tonsuring George Synkletos, a favourite of the Emperor Constantine V. Some modern scholars, however, reject the conventional story whereby Constantine's persecution of monks was a result of the latter championing the cause of the iconophiles. Rather, it has been suggested that the emperor's drive against monasticism had military and financial reasons, since the monasteries paid no tax and the monks were exempt from military duty. Consequently, the persecution of Stephen may have had more to do with his popularity and strong advocacy of monasticism, rather than his active opposition to iconoclasm as reported in his Life.

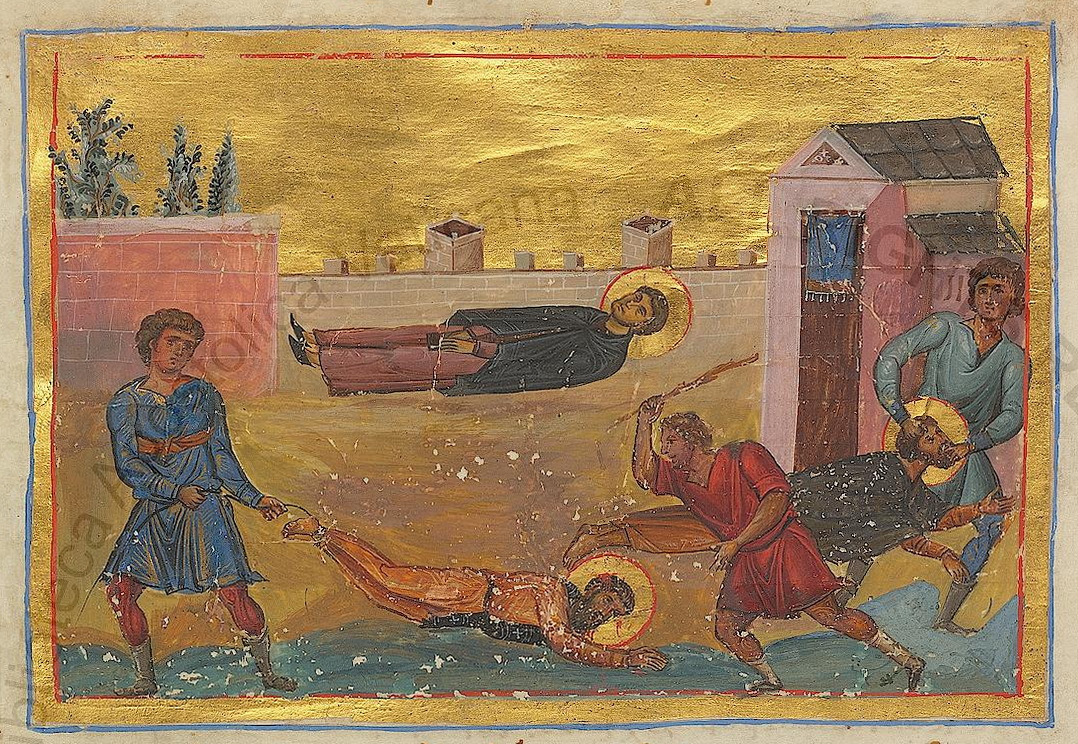
Martyrdom of the monks Stephen the Younger, Andrew and Peter, depicted in the 11th century Menologion of Basil II.

Constantine V then sent soldiers who arrested him and brought him to a monastery in Chrysopolis. There again he refused to accept the decisions of Hieria, and was banished to the island of Prokonnesos. In his second year of exile (circa 764), he was brought to the Phiale prison in Constantinople and was questioned by the emperor himself. After almost a year of imprisonment in the prison of the city's praetorium, he was condemned to death by Constantine, and dragged by soldiers through the streets, where he was clubbed to death. His corpse was dragged through the streets, while his skull was rescued by one of his followers and brought to the Dius Monastery. His relics are recorded in various Constantinopolitan churches and monasteries during the 13th–15th centuries. His body was deposited either at the Lips Monastery (according to Russian travellers) or the martyrion of St. Stephen the Protomartyr in the quarter of Constantinianae, and his right hand was at the Pantokrator Monastery. His skull, which became the subject of a special procession presided over by the Eparch of Constantinople on his feast day (28 November), was located at the Peribleptos Monastery in the 14th century, and is today claimed to be in the possession of the Saint Panteleimon monastery at Mount Athos.

== Depiction ==
As a prominent defender of the images, and iconoclasm's greatest martyr, Stephen is portrayed holding an icon or a diptych of icons, usually displaying the busts of Christ and the Virgin Mary. He is also one of the witnesses in the famous Russian icon celebrating the "Triumph of Orthodoxy".

== Sources ==
- Huxley, George (1977). "On the Vita of St Stephen the Younger". Greek, Roman, and Byzantine Studies. 18 (1): 97–108.
- Kazhdan, Alexander; Ševčenko, Nancy P. (1991). "Stephen the Younger". In Kazhdan, Alexander (ed.). The Oxford Dictionary of Byzantium. Oxford and New York: Oxford University Press. p. 1955. ISBN 0-19-504652-8.
- Majeska, George P. (1984). Russian Travelers to Constantinople in the Fourteenth and Fifteenth Centuries. Washington, District of Columbia: Dumbarton Oaks. ISBN 978-0-88402-101-8.
- Rochow, Ilse (1994). Kaiser Konstantin V. (741–775). Materialien zu seinem Leben und Nachleben (in German). Frankfurt am Main, Germany: Peter Lang. ISBN 3-631-47138-6.
