= Mount Auxentius =

Mountain in Turkey

- Mount St. Auxentius; Kayış Dağı
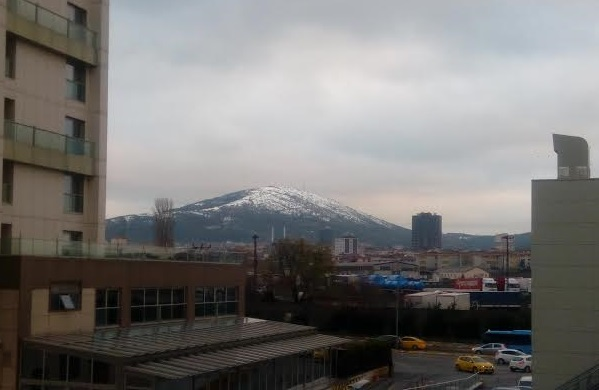
- Mount Auxentius (Kayış Dağı) in winter

Highest point
- Elevation: 428 m (1,404 ft)
- Coordinates: 40°58′15″N 29°09′51″E

Geography
- Location: Istanbul
- Country: Turkey

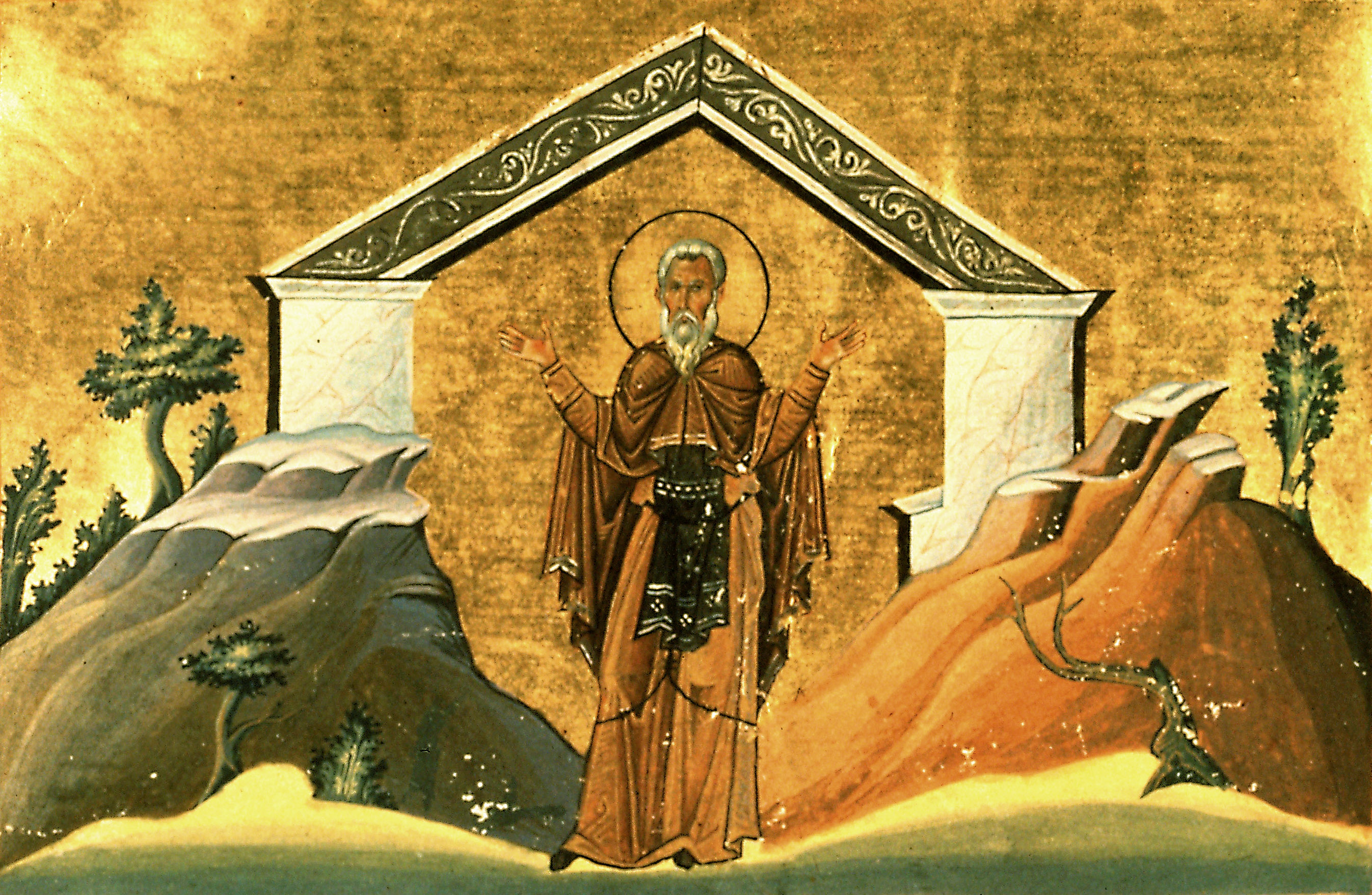
Auxentius of Bithynia, whom the mountain is named after

Mount Auxentius (also known as Mount St. Auxentius, Mount Auxentios, or Mount Scopas), today known as Kayış Dağı in Turkish, is a mountain located in the eastern outskirts of Istanbul, Turkey, in Kayışdağı neighborhood. Its summit is 428 metres above sea level. The mountain is named after Auxentius of Bithynia.

The mountain was home to Christian monks and ascetics during the Byzantine period. Byzantine Christian monks who lived on the mountain included Saint Stephen the New (c. 713–764) and Saint Macarius of Mount Auxentius (died 768).
