= List of Byzantine battles =

The following is a list of battles fought by the Eastern Roman or Byzantine Empire, from the 6th century AD until its dissolution in the mid-15th century, organized by date. The list is not exhaustive. For battles fought by the Byzantine Empire's Roman predecessors, see List of Roman battles.

== 6th century ==
- 503 – Siege of Amida (502–503) – The Persians captured the city of Amida.
- 528 – Battle of Thannuris (and/or Battle of Mindouos) – Sassanid Persians defeat Byzantines under Belisarius, death of Jabalah IV ibn al-Harith.
- 530 –
  - Battle of Dara – Belisarius defeats the Persians
  - Battle of Satala – Byzantine Empire defeats the Sassanid Empire
- 531 – Battle of Callinicum – Persian general Azarethes defeats Belisarius
- 533 –
  - 13 September Battle of Ad Decimum – Belisarius defeats Vandals near Carthage
  - 15 December Battle of Tricamarum – Belisarius defeats again the Vandals near Carthage.
- 535 –
  - Battle of Mammes
  - Battle of Mount Bourgaon
  - Siege of Panormus
- 536 – Siege of Naples – Byzantines capture Naples
- 537 – Siege of Salona – Byzantines defended against Ostrogothic attacks
- 537 – Battle of Scalas Veteres
- 537–38 – Siege of Rome – Byzantines defend Rome against the Ostrogoths
- 538 –
  - Siege of Ariminum – Byzantines take Ariminum from the Ostrogoths
  - Siege of Urbinus – Byzantines take Urbinus from the Ostrogoths
  - Siege of Urviventus – Byzantines take Urviventus from the Ostrogoths
- 539 – Siege of Auximus – Byzantines take Auximus from the Ostrogoths
- 539–540 Siege of Ravenna — Byzantines force the Ostrogothic king to surrender
- 541 –
  - Siege of Petra – Sasanians capture Petra, Lazica from the Byzantines
  - Battle of Nisibis – Byzantines defeat the Persians
  - Siege of Sisauranon – The Sasanian garrison went over to the Byzantine side
  - Siege of Verona – Ostrogoths under Totila repel the Byzantines
- 542 –
  - Battle of Faventia – Ostrogoths under Totila defeat the combined Byzantine armies
  - Battle of Mucellium – Ostrogoths under Totila defeat the Byzantines
- 542–543 – Siege of Naples – Totila recaptures Naples
- 543 – Battle of Anglon – The Byzantine invasion of Persarmenia is defeated
- 544 –
  - Battle of Cillium – The Byzantine governor of Africa Solomon is killed by the Moors
  - Siege of Edessa – Unsuccessful siege of the Byzantine fortress of Edessa by the Sasanians
- 546 – Sack of Rome by Totila, King of the Ostrogoths
- 546 or 547 – Battle of Sufetula – Byzantine victory over the Moors
- 548 – Battle of the Fields of Cato – The new Byzantine commander, John Troglita, crushes the Moorish uprising
- 549 – Siege of Petra (549) – The Byzantines attempt to retake Petra
- 550 – Battle of Hippis River – Byzantines defeated a Persian army in northern Lazica
- 551 –
  - Battle of Sena Gallica – Byzantine fleet destroys the Ostrogothic navy
  - Siege of Petra (550–551) – Byzantines recapture and destroy Petra, Lazica from the Sasanians
  - Siege of Archaeopolis (551) – The Byzantines successfully defend Archaeopolis against the Persians
- 552 – Battle of Taginae – Narses replaces Belisarius and defeats Ostrogoths under Totila
- 553 –
  - Battle of Mons Lactarius – Narses defeats the Ostrogoths under Teia
  - Battle of Telephis–Ollaria – Byzantines are repelled by a Sasanian assault
- 554, October – Battle of the Volturnus – Narses defeats the Franks
- 559 – Battle of Melantias – Belisarius defeats the Kutrigurs
- 555 – Siege of Phasis – Sasanian siege of the town Phasis is defeated by the Byzantines
- 573 –
  - Siege of Nisibis – Failed Byzantine siege of Nisibis
  - Siege of Dara – Sasanian Empire captures the strategic fortress of Dara
  - 573 – Battle of Apamea – Sasanian Empire sacked Apamea
- 576 – Battle of Melitene – Byzantine Empire defeats the Sasanian Empire
- 586 – Battle of Solachon – Byzantine Empire defeats the Sasanian Empire
- 588 – Battle of Martyropolis – Byzantine Empire defeats the Sasanian Empire
- 591 – Battle of Blarathon – Byzantines defeat Bahram Chobin and help Khosrau II to recover his throne

== 7th century ==
- 613 – Battle of Antioch
- 614 –
  - Siege of Caesarea
  - Siege of Jerusalem
- 622 - Battle of Ophlimus. A Byzantine victory as a result of clever tactics by Heraclius
- 624 - Battle of Ganzak. Heraclius crushes Khosrow's army
- 625 - Battle of Archesh. Byzantine empire capture Persarmenia
- 626 – Siege of Constantinople
- 627 – Battle of Nineveh
- 629 – Battle of Mu'tah
- 634 –
  - Battle of Bosra
  - Battle of Ajnadayn
  - Battle of Fahl
  - Siege of Damascus
  - Battle of Maraj-al-Debaj
- 635–636 – Siege of Emesa
- 636 – Battle of Yarmouk
- 637 –
  - Siege of Jerusalem
  - Battle of Hazir
- 637 –
  - Siege of Aleppo
  - Battle of the Iron Bridge
- 638 – Siege of Germanicia
- 640 – Battle of Heliopolis
- 641 – Siege of Alexandria
- 646 – Battle of Nikiou
- 647 – Battle of Sufetula
- 655 – Battle of the Masts
- 674–678 – Siege of Constantinople
- 680 – Battle of Ongal
- 682 or 683 – Battle of Vescera
- 692 – Battle of Sebastopolis
- 698 – Battle of Carthage

== 8th century ==
- 707–708 or 708–709 – Siege of Tyana – Umayyads besiege and capture Tyana
- 708 – Battle of Anchialus (708)
- 717–718 – Siege of Constantinople – Second and last siege of Constantinople by the Arabs
- 727 – Siege of Nicaea – Unsuccessful siege of Nicaea by the Arabs
- 740 – Battle of Akroinon – Byzantine emperor Leo III the Isaurian destroys an Arab invasion force
- 746 – Battle of Keramaia
- 756 – Battle of Marcellae
- 759 – Battle of the Rishki Pass
- 763 – Battle of Anchialus
- 766 – Siege of Kamacha – Unsuccessful Abbasid siege of the fort of Kamacha
- 774 – Battle of Berzitia
- 782 – Abbasid invasion of Asia Minor – Harun al-Rashid leads his troops as far as Chrysopolis
- 788 – Battle of Kopidnadon – Byzantines defeated by Abbasid invasion
- 792 – Battle of Marcellae

== 9th century ==
- 804 – Battle of Krasos – Abbasid army defeats emperor Nikephoros I
- 806 – Abbasid invasion of Asia Minor – Harun al-Rashid invades Asia Minor and sacks Heraclea
- 811 – Battle of Pliska – Emperor Nikephoros I is defeated by Bulgarian army
- 827–828 – Siege of Syracuse – Unsuccessful siege of Syracuse by the Aghlabids
- 829 – Battle of Thasos – Byzantine fleet is defeated by Emirate of Crete
- 838 –
  - Battle of Anzen – Emperor Theophilos is defeated by the Abbasids under Afshin.
  - Sack of Amorium – Abbasids under Caliph al-Mu'tasim besiege and sack the city of Amorium
- 844 – Battle of Mauropotamos – Abbasid army defeats the Byzantines under Theoktistos
- 853 – Sack of Damietta – Byzantine fleet raids and captures the port of Damietta in Egypt
- 862 – Capture of Faruriyyah – Abbasids capture the border fortress of Farurriyah
- 863 – Battle of Lalakaon – Byzantine army under Petronas annihilates the army of Malatya and kills its emir, Umar al-Aqta
- 868 – Siege of Ragusa – Byzantine fleet under Niketas Ooryphas relieves Ragusa and restores Byzantine control over Dalmatia
- 872 or 878 – Battle of Bathys Ryax – The Byzantines defeat the Paulicians and kill their leader, Chrysocheir
- 872 or 873 – Battle of Kardia – Byzantine fleet under Niketas Ooryphas defeats the Cretan Saracens under the renegade Photios
- 873 or 879 – Battle of the Gulf of Corinth – Byzantine fleet under Niketas Ooryphas defeats the Cretan Saracens under the renegade Photios
- 877–878 – Siege of Syracuse – Fall of Syracuse to the Aghlabids
- 880 –
  - Battle of Cephalonia – Nasar defeats an Aghlabid fleet raiding western Greece in a night battle
  - Battle of Stelai – Nasar defeats an Aghlabid fleet off Calabria
- After 883 : Siege of Euripos
- 888 – Battle of Milazzo – Aghlabids defeat Byzantines
- 896 – Battle of Boulgarophygon – Bulgarian Army defeats Byzantines under Leo Katakalon

== 10th century ==
- 902 – Siege of Taormina – The former Aghlabid emir, Ibrahim II, captures the fortress of Taormina
- 904 Sack of Thessalonica
- 915 Battle of Garigliano
- 917 –
  - Battle of Achelous
  - Battle of Katasyrtai
- 922 – Battle of Pegae
- 941 – Rus' raid against Constantinople and Bithynia
- 953 – Battle of Marash
- 958 – Battle of Raban
- 960 – Battle of Andrassos
- 962 – Siege of Taormina – The Fatimids capture the fortress of Taormina
- 965 – Battle of the Straits – The Fatimids destroy a Byzantine invasion fleet under Niketas Abalantes
- 970 – Battle of Arcadiopolis
- 970–971 – Siege of Dorostolon
- 971 – Battle of Alexandretta
- 986 – Battle of the Gates of Trajan
- 994 – Battle of the Orontes
- 995 – Battle of Thessalonica
- 997 – Battle of Spercheios
- 998 – Battle of Apamea

== 11th century ==
- 1004 –
  - Battle of Skopje
  - Battle of Thessalonica
- 1009 – Battle of Kreta
- 1014 –
  - Battle of Thessalonica
  - Battle of Kleidion
  - Battle of Strumica
- 1015 – Battle of Bitola
- 1017 – Battle of Setina
- 1018 –
  - Battle of Dyrrhachium
  - Battle of Cannae
- 1021 – Battle of Shirimni
- 1022 – Battle of Svindax
- 1024 – Battle of Lemnos
- 1030 – Battle of Azaz
- 1040 –
  - Battle of Thessalonica
  - Battle of Thessalonica
- 1041 –
  - Battle of Ostrovo
  - Battle of Olivento
  - Battle of Montemaggiore
  - Battle of Montepeloso
- 1043 – Rus' raid into the Aegean Sea
- 1047 – Battle of Sasireti
- 1048 – Battle of Kapetron
- 1053 – Battle of Zygos Pass
- 1054 – Battle of Manzikert
- 1067 – Battle of Caesarea
- 1068–71 – Siege of Bari
- 1069 – Battle of Iconium
- 1071 – Battle of Manzikert
- 1078 – Battle of Kalavrye
- 1081 – Battle of Dyrrhachium
- 1091 – Battle of Levounion
- 1097 – Siege of Nicaea

== 12th century ==
- 1107–1108 – Siege of Dyrrhachium
- 1113 – Siege of Nicaea
- 1116 – Battle of Philomelion
- 1122 – Battle of Beroia
- 1138 – Siege of Shaizar
- 1167 – Battle of Sirmium
- 1176 – Battle of Myriokephalon
- 1177 – Battle of Hyelion and Leimocheir
- 1185 –
  - Sack of Thessalonica
  - Battle of Demetritzes
- 1187 – Siege of Lovech
- 1190 – Battle of Tryavna
- 1191 – Battle of South Morava
- 1194 – Battle of Arcadiopolis
- 1196 – Battle of Serres

== 13th century ==
- 1201 – Siege of Varna
- 1203 – Siege of Constantinople – First attack on Constantinople by the Fourth Crusade, deposition of Alexios III Angelos
- 1204 – Siege of Constantinople – Second attack and capture of Constantinople by the Fourth Crusade, dissolution of the Byzantine Empire, establishment of the Latin Empire
- 1205 –
  - Battle of the Olive Grove of Kountouras
  - Battle of Adramyttium
- 1205–06 – Siege of Trebizond
- 1207 – Siege of Attalia
- 1211 –
  - Battle of Antioch on the Meander
  - Battle of the Rhyndacus
- 1214 – Siege of Sinope
- 1222–23 – Siege of Trebizond
- 1223 or 1224 – Battle of Poimanenon
- 1230 – Battle of Klokotnitsa – Bulgarians defeat and capture Theodore Komnenos Doukas
- 1235 – Siege of Constantinople – Unsuccessful joint Bulgarian–Nicaean siege of Constantinople
- 1254 – Battle of Adrianople
- 1259 – Battle of Pelagonia
- 1260 – Siege of Constantinople
- 1263 –
  - Battle of Prinitza
  - Battle of Settepozzi
- 1263 or 1264 – Battle of Makryplagi
- 1272/73 or 1274/75 –
  - Battle of Neopatras
  - Battle of Demetrias
- 1279 – Battle of Devina
- 1280–81 – Siege of Berat

== 14th century ==
- 1304 –
  - Battle of Bapheus – First Ottoman victory over the regular Byzantine army
  - Battle of Skafida – Bulgarians defeat the Byzantines
  - First Siege of Philadelphia – Byzantine–Catalan victory over the Germiyanids and Aydinids
- 1305 – Battle of Apros -The Catalan Company defeats the Byzantines
- 1310 –
  - Conquest of Rhodes – Hospitallers capture Rhodes
  - Second Siege of Philadelphia — Second unsuccessful siege of the city by the Germiyanids and Aydinids
- 1320 – Battle of Saint George — The Byzantines under Andronikos Asen ambush and defeat the forces of the Principality of Achaea, securing possession of Arcadia.
- 1320–26 – Siege of Prusa – The Ottomans capture the city of Prusa, which becomes their capital
- 1322–24 – Third Siege of Philadelphia – Third unsuccessful siege of the city by the Germiyanids and Aydinids
- 1329 – Battle of Pelekanon – The Ottomans defeat the last Byzantine attempt to defend Asia Minor
- 1328–31 – Siege of Nicaea – Ottomans capture the city of Nicaea
- 1332 – Battle of Rusokastro – Bulgarians defeat the Byzantines
- 1333–37 – Siege of Nicomedia – Fall of Nicomedia to the Ottomans
- 1354 – Fall of Gallipoli – Capture of Gallipoli by the Ottomans, first Ottoman stronghold in Europe
- 1366 – Reconquest of Gallipoli – Amadeus VII, Count of Savoy, recovers Gallipoli for the Byzantines
- 1390 – Fall of Philadelphia – Ottomans capture Philadelphia, the last Byzantine stronghold in Asia

== 15th century ==
- 1411 – Siege of Constantinople – Ottomans failed to besiege Constantinople
- 1422 – Siege of Constantinople – Ottomans failed to besiege Constantinople
- 1422–30 – Siege of Thessalonica – Ottomans besiege and capture Thessalonica (after 1423 held by Venice)
- 1427 – Battle of the Echinades - Last naval battle ( and battle in general ) Byzantine empire won.
- 1453 – Fall of Constantinople – Ottoman Sultan Mehmed II captures Constantinople, ending the Byzantine Empire
- 1461 – Siege of Trebizond – Sultan Mehmed II captures Trebizond, ending the Empire of Trebizond
