= Cretan expedition =

Cretan expedition may refer to:

- Cretan expedition (826)
- Cretan expedition (828)
- Cretan expedition (843)
- Cretan expedition (911–912)
- Cretan expedition (949)
