= Droungarios of the Fleet =

Commander of the Imperial Fleet of the Byzantine navy

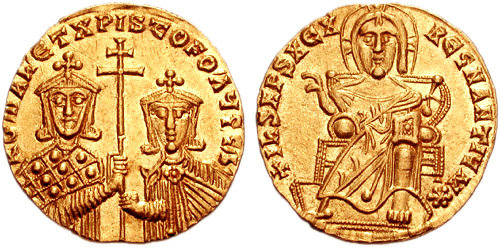
Gold solidus of Romanos I Lekapenos, who used his position as droungarios of the Fleet to become Emperor

The droungarios of the Fleet (Greek: δρουγγάριος τοῦ πλοΐμου/τῶν πλοΐμων, droungarios tou ploïmou/tōn ploïmōn; after the 11th century δρουγγάριος τοῦ στόλου, droungarios tou stolou), sometimes anglicized as Drungary of the Fleet, was the commander of the Imperial Fleet (βασιλικὸς στόλος, basilikos stolos, or βασιλικὸν πλόϊμον, basilikon ploïmon), the central division of the Byzantine navy stationed at the capital of Constantinople, as opposed to the provincial (thematic) fleets. From the late 11th century, when the Byzantine fleets were amalgamated into a single force under the megas doux, the post, now known as the Grand droungarios of the Fleet (μέγας δρουγγάριος τοῦ στόλου, megas droungarios tou stolou), became the second-in-command of the megas doux and continued in this role until the end of the Byzantine Empire.

== Background and history of the office ==
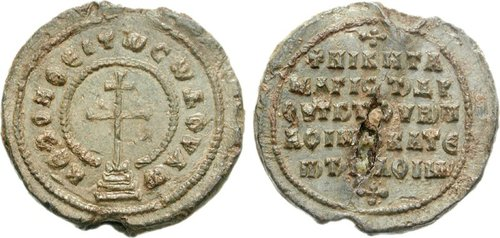
Seal of Niketas, magistros, droungarios tou basilikou ploïmou and katepanō tōn ploïmōn (late 9th/early 10th century)

In response to the Muslim conquests, some time in the latter half of the 7th century, the bulk of the Byzantine navy was formed into a single command, the great fleet of the Karabisianoi (Greek: Καραβισιάνοι, "the Ships' Men"), commanded, like the land themes that appeared around the same time, by a stratēgos (stratēgos tōn karabōn/karabisianōn, "general of the ships/ships' men"). The Karabisianoi, however, proved inadequate and were replaced in the early 8th century by a more complex system composed of three elements, which, with minor alterations, survived until the 11th century: a central fleet based at Constantinople; a few regional naval commands, namely the maritime Theme of the Cibyrrhaeots and a number of independent commands under a droungarios, which eventually evolved into the maritime themes of the Aegean Sea and of Samos in the course of the 9th century; and a greater number of local squadrons in the land themes, charged with purely defensive and police tasks and subordinate to the local thematic governors.

A fleet was based in Constantinople at least since the 7th century, and indeed played a central role in the repulsion of the two Arab sieges of Constantinople in 674–678 and 717–718, but the exact date of the establishment of the Imperial Fleet (βασιλικὸς στόλος, basilikos stolos, or βασιλικὸν πλόϊμον, basilikon ploïmon) as a distinct command is unclear. The Irish historian J. B. Bury, followed by the French Byzaninist Rodolphe Guilland, considered it "not improbable" that the Imperial Fleet existed as a subordinate command under the stratēgos tōn karabisianōn already in the 7th century. Certainly the droungarios of the Fleet first appears in the Taktikon Uspensky of c. 842/43; and as there is little evidence for major fleets operating from Constantinople during the 8th century, the Greek Byzantinist Hélène Ahrweiler dated the fleet's creation to the early 9th century. From that point on, the Imperial Fleet formed the main naval reserve force and provided the core of various expeditionary fleets.

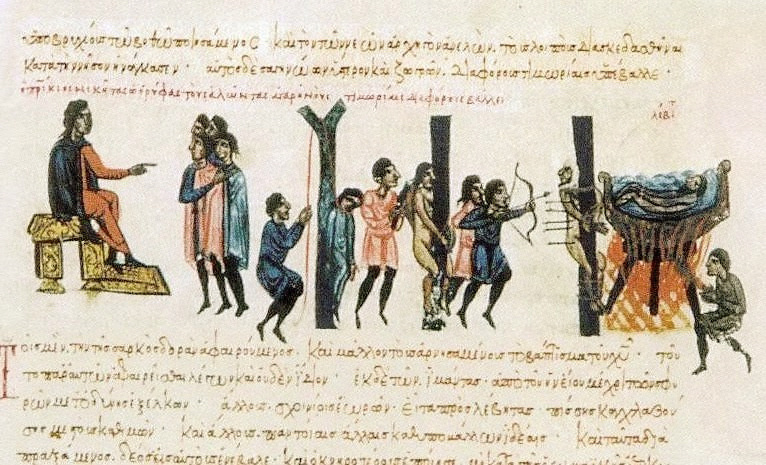
The droungarios of the Fleet Niketas Ooryphas punishes the Cretan Saracens, as depicted in the Madrid Skylitzes.

In the Taktikon Uspensky, the droungarios of the Fleet is positioned relatively lowly in the hierarchy, coming after all the senior military and civilian officials, placed between the prōtostratōr and the ek prosōpou of the themes. By the time of the 899 Klētorologion of Philotheos, however, he had risen considerably in importance, being placed variously either immediately before or after the logothetēs tou dromou and in the 35th or 38th position of the overall hierarchy, ahead of the domestikoi of the guard regiments (tagmata) of the Hikanatoi and the Noumeroi, as well as of the various chartoularioi (civil department heads). Indeed, he was not classed with the other military commanders, whether of the themes or of the tagmata, but in the special class of military officials, the stratarchai, where he is listed second, after the hetaireiarchēs, the commander of the imperial bodyguard. This rise coincided with the revival in the Byzantine navy's fortunes, begun under Michael III (r. 843–867) but carried to fruition under the first two emperors of the Macedonian dynasty, Basil I the Macedonian (r. 867–886) and Leo VI the Wise (r. 886–912).

The Klētorologion further lists his subordinate officials as comprising his deputy or topotērētēs (τοποτηρητής), the secretary or chartoularios (χαρτουλάριος), the head messenger or prōtomandatōr and the other messengers (μανδάτορες, mandatores), the commanders of squadrons or komētes (κόμητες; sing. κόμης, komēs), and the centurions of the individual ships (κένταρχοι, kentarchoi; sing. κένταρχος, kentarchos). In addition, there was a komēs tēs hetaireias (κόμης τῆς ἑταιρείας), whose function is disputed: according to Bury, he probably commanded the foreign mercenaries, especially Rus' or Scandinavians, who served as marines, but the Greek historian Nicolas Oikonomides considered him the head of the droungarios' personal guard. According to the De Ceremoniis of Emperor Constantine VII (r. 913–959), he also had a role in imperial ceremonies, often in association with the droungarios tēs viglēs. Typical dignities associated with the post where the senior ranks of prōtospatharios, patrikios, and anthypatos.

The office reached its heyday during the 10th century, when several important personages held it, most notably Emperor Romanos I Lekapenos (r. 920–944), who used it as a springboard to the throne. The office continued in the 11th century, but as the fleet was no longer very active, the droungarios chiefly commanded the Constantinopolitan fleet instead of leading expeditions; the title was now usually referred to as droungarios tou stolou (δρουγγάριος τοῦ στόλου). With the accession of Alexios I Komnenos (r. 1081–1118) a major reorganization of the navy took place. With the great naval themes having suffered a long decline as military formations, Alexios gathered the remnants of the provincial fleets and amalgamated them with the Imperial Fleet into a single force based in Constantinople, and placed it under the command of the megas doux.

The post of the droungarios of the Fleet remained in existence, now with the addition of the prefix megas ("grand"). According to the mid-14th century Book of Offices of Pseudo-Kodinos, he "has the same relation to the megas doux as the megas droungarios tēs viglēs had to the megas domestikos", i.e., he was the second in command. He was apparently in charge of subordinate droungarioi, who however were of very lowly rank and are rarely mentioned in the sources. Although reduced in significance in comparison to its heyday, the megas droungarios tou stolou remained important, ranking 32nd in the overall hierarchy in the Book of Offices. Pseudo-Kodinos gives his ceremonial costume at the time as follows: a gold-embroidered skiadion hat, a plain silk kabbadion kaftan, and a skaranikon (domed hat) covered in golden and lemon-yellow silk and decorated with gold wire and images of the emperor in front and rear, respectively depicted enthroned and on horseback. He bore no staff of office (dikanikion).

== List of known holders ==
Note: Uncertain entries are marked in italics.

Name	Tenure	Appointed by	Notes	Refs
Krateros	c. 820s	Michael II the Amorian	Titled exarchōn tou stolou ("leader of the fleet") by Zonaras, perhaps the first holder of the post.	
John	c. 859/67	Michael III	Addressee of a letter by Patriarch Photios; otherwise unknown.	
Niketas Ooryphas	c. 860–873 or 879 (?)	Michael III; Basil I the Macedonian	A very successful commander, he spearheaded Basil I's naval offensive, relieving the Arab siege of Ragusa, attacking the Emirate of Bari, and scoring two major victories over the Cretan Saracens at Kardia and the Gulf of Corinth.	
Elias	c. 862/67 – c. 869	Basil I the Macedonian	A prōtospatharios, he was charged by Basil with bringing the deposed Patriarch of Constantinople Ignatios to the capital in 867. Addressee of three letters by Patriarch Photios between c. 862 and 869.	
Adrianos	c. 877/78	Basil I the Macedonian	Former deputy of Ooryphas, he was sent by Basil I to assist Syracuse in Sicily during its final siege by the Aghlabids, but was delayed by contrary winds and failed to reach the city.	
Nasar	c. 879/80	Basil I the Macedonian	Inflicted two heavy defeats on the Aghlabids of Ifriqiya at Cephalonia and in southern Italy.	
Eustathios [Argyros]	c. 894–904	Leo VI the Wise	Participated in the Byzantine–Bulgarian war of 894–896, and was dismissed after failing to prevent the fall of Taormina in Sicily to the Aghlabids in 902. Restored to his post, he was again dismissed in 904 for failing to confront the Saracens under Leo of Tripoli. His possible identity with the contemporary general Eustathios Argyros is a matter of dispute.	
Himerios	904–912	Leo VI the Wise	Appointed to replace Eustathios, he failed to prevent the sack of Thessalonica, but scored a few successes against the Arabs. Dismissed after leading a failed expedition against Crete, and suffering a heavy defeat at the hands of Leo of Tripoli at Chios in 912.	
Romanos Lekapenos	c. 917–919	Zoe Karbonopsina	A career naval officer of lowly origin, he rose to senior commands, becoming eventually droungarios of the Fleet under the regime of Empress-regent Zoe Karbonopsina. Used his position to outmanoeuvre her and the general Leo Phokas the Elder, and assume the guardianship of Zoe's son Constantine VII, to whom he married his daughter. Became senior emperor in 920, and ruled until deposed by his own sons in 944.	
John Rhadenos	c. 921/22	Romanos I Lekapenos	Scored a decisive victory over Leo of Tripoli off Lemnos, in which Leo was killed.	
Alexios Mosele	c. 922	Romanos I Lekapenos	Killed at the Battle of Pegae against the Bulgarians in 922	
Lips	either c. 908/17 or c. 922/44 (?)	either Leo VI the Wise or Romanos I Lekapenos	The Patria of Constantinople record a patrikios and droungarios of the Fleet, who during the joint reign of Romanos Lekapenos and Constantine VII established a monastery and a guest house in Constantinople. He is usually identified with Constantine Lips, who founded the Lips Monastery in c. 908, but this identification is uncertain; Constantine Lips was active under Leo VI and killed at the Battle of Acheloos in 917.	
Constantine Gongyles	c. 944/45–949	Constantine VII	Eunuch active in the court since the regency of Zoe, he was appointed to the post immediately after Constantine VII became sole emperor, and led the failed expedition to recover Crete in 949.	
Constantine	unknown	Romanos I Lekapenos	A prōtospatharios and manglabitēs, he was sent to a diplomatic mission to Caucasian Iberia c. 923; in the sources he is also recorded by his (evidently later) titles of patrikios and droungarios of the Fleet, hence identified by some either with Constantine Lips or with Constantine Gongyles, but both are problematic.	
Joseph Bringas	950s	Constantine VII	Eunuch holding senior offices in the court since Romanos I's reign, Constantine VII appointed him droungarios of the Fleet as well; under Romanos II rose to paradynasteuōn and chief minister of the empire.	
Niketas Abalantes	c. 964	Nikephoros II Phokas	Leader of the great expedition to recover Sicily, after initial success the Byzantine fleet was decisively defeated by the Fatimids at the Battle of the Straits. Niketas was taken captive to Ifriqiya, where he remained until ransomed in 967.	
Leo Lekapenos	c. 971–976	John I Tzimiskes	Relative and close collaborator of the powerful parakoimōmenos Basil Lekapenos, he was appointed to the post as part of Tzimiskes's purge of Nikephoros Phokas' followers. He organized the dispatch of the fleet in the 971 expedition against the Rus', but himself remained in Constantinople, where he suppressed an abortive coup by Leo Phokas the Younger. He remained in the post until promoted (either already by Tzimiskes or by Basil II) to prōtovestiarios.	
Bardas Parsakoutenos	c. 977/78	Basil II	Leo the Deacon reports that he defeated a rebel fleet off Abydos during the first rebellion of Bardas Skleros. His title is unclear, but it is generally assumed that he commanded the Imperial Fleet.	
Theodore Karantenos	c. 977/78	Basil II	Termed nauarchos by John Skylitzes, defeated a rebel fleet under Michael Kourtikios off Phocaea during the first rebellion of Bardas Skleros. It is unclear whether he commanded the Imperial Fleet or a thematic squadron.	
Kyriakos	c. 989	Basil II	Mentioned only as defending Abydos against the rebel Bardas Phokas the Younger in spring 989.	
Stephen	c. 1038–1040	Michael IV the Paphlagonian	Brother-in-law of the emperor and patrikios, he was largely responsible for the failure of the attempt to recover Sicily through his dispute with George Maniakes. He is not explicitly called droungarios, however, but rather "master of the fleet" ([kat]archōn tou stolou).	
Nikephoros Komnenos	c. 1081	Alexios I Komnenos	Younger brother of Alexios I, made sebastos and megas droungarios tou stolou after the latter's accession. This was an honorific appointment rather than an active office, and Nikephoros does not appear to have exercised any command.	
Eustathios Kymineianos	c. 1101	Alexios I Komnenos	Confidante and one of the chief aides of Alexios, he held various fleet commands after 1087. He probably became megas droungarios in c. 1101/02, when he was sent to seize and refortify Korykos. In 1107 he governed Constantinople in Alexios' absence on campaign.	
Constantine Dalassenos	c. 1090	Alexios I Komnenos	Qualified as thalassokrator ("master of the sea") by Anna Komnene, he was likely a megas droungarios. He commanded the Byzantine fleet against the Turkish emir Tzachas.	
Demetrios Branas	c. 1141	Manuel I Komnenos	Admiral (nauarchos) during the campaign against Mesud I, Sultan of Rum.	
Constantine Komnenos	c. 1143–1147	Manuel I Komnenos	Attendant of Church councils in 1143 and 1147, qualified simply as sebastos and megas droungarios, possibly megas droungarios tēs viglas rather than of the Fleet.	
Nikephoros Dasiotes	c. 1147	Manuel I Komnenos	Admiral (nauarchos) of the fleet that conveyed Conrad III to Palestine.	
Maios	c. 1151	Manuel I Komnenos	Admiral (nauarchos) who signed the peace treaty with the Kingdom of Sicily	
John Makrembolites	c. 1140s/50s	Manuel I Komnenos	Makrembolites is known as a courtier of Manuel. A seal calling him megas droungarios survives, but it most likely refers to the post of megas droungarios tēs viglas rather than of the Fleet.	
Gabalas	c. 1241–1266/67	John III Vatatzes	The pansebastos and megas droungarios tou stolou Gabalas is attested in an act of the Nicaean emperor John Vatatzes. He was the father-in-law of a Michael Komnenos Branas. It is possible that it refers to either Leo Gabalas or his brother John Gabalas, the autonomous rulers of Rhodes.	
Stephen Mouzalon	until 1303	Andronikos II Palaiologos	Sent to mediate in a quarrel between the Genoese and the Catalan Company, he was killed in the clash.	
John Doukas Mouzalon	early 14th century	Andronikos II Palaiologos	Recipient of a number of poems composed for him by Manuel Philes.	
John Philanthropenos	c. 1324	Andronikos II Palaiologos	Oikeios of the Emperor, attested in the post in an act of July 1324.	
George Isaris	c. 1344	possibly John V Palaiologos	Megas droungarios tou stolou in 1344, he joined John Kantakouzenos in the next year. Advanced to megas primikērios before his death c. 1373/74.	
Loukas Notaras	c. 1441	Manuel II Palaiologos	Captained the ship that brought Constantine Palaiologos to Lesbos; called droungarios, he may have been megas droungarios tou stolou. He later became megas doux and was one of the chief ministers of the Empire up to the Fall of Constantinople.	

A number of holders are known only by their surviving seals of office, and can only approximately be dated:

Name	Period	Notes	Refs
Euphemianos	c. 750/c. 850	Known from a series of 14 seals that detail his career, from spatharios and droungarios of the Aegean Sea, to prōtospatharios and droungarios tou ploïmou, and eventually patrikios and stratēgos of Hellas.	
John	late 8th/early 9th century	Known from a single seal that names him as spatharios and droungarios tou ploïmou.	
Basil	second half of 9th century	Known from a single seal naming him as patrikios, imperial prōtospatharios and droungarios tou ploïmou.	
Barsakios	late 9th century	Evidently Armenian in origin, known from a single seal naming him as anthypatos, patrikios, imperial prōtospatharios and droungarios tou ploïmou.	
Niketas	10th century	Known only through his seal naming him as a magistros, droungarios tou ploïmou and katepanō tōn ploïmōn. Placed by Werner Seibt in the first third of the 10th century.	
Hilarion	10th century	Known from a single seal naming him as imperial prōtospatharios, droungarios tou ploïmou, primikērios and epi tou Chrysotriklinou.	
[Theodoros] Rhadinos	first half of 11th century	Known from a single seal naming him as anthypatos and patrikios, imperial prōtospatharios, and droungarios tou ploïmou. His first name is tentative.	
Andronikos	first half of 11th century	Known only through two seals naming him as a patrikios, droungarios tou ploïmou and pinkernēs.	
Constantine	11th century	Known only through a single seal naming him as a vestarchēs and droungarios tōn ploïmōn.	
Solomon	11th century	Known only through a single seal naming him as a droungarios tōn ploïmōn.	

== Sources ==
- Ahrweiler, Hélène (1966). Byzance et la mer: La marine de guerre, la politique et les institutions maritimes de Byzance aux VIIe–XVe siècles (in French). Paris: Presses universitaires de France.
- Bury, J. B.; Philotheus (1911). The Imperial Administrative System of the Ninth Century (With a Revised Text of the Kletorologion of Philotheos). London: Oxford University Press.
- Guilland, Rodolphe (1967). "Le Drongaire de la flotte, le Grand drongaire de la flotte, le Duc de la flotte, le Mégaduc". Recherches sur les institutions byzantines [Studies on the Byzantine Institutions]. Berliner byzantinische Arbeiten 35 (in French). Vol. I. Berlin and Amsterdam: Akademie-Verlag & Adolf M. Hakkert. pp. 535–562. OCLC 878894516.
- Haldon, John (1999). Warfare, State and Society in the Byzantine World, 565–1204. London: UCL Press. ISBN 1-85728-495-X.
- Holmes, Catherine (2005). Basil II and the Governance of Empire (976–1025). Oxford: Oxford University Press. ISBN 978-0-19-927968-5.
- Kazhdan, Alexander, ed. (1991). The Oxford Dictionary of Byzantium. Oxford and New York: Oxford University Press. ISBN 0-19-504652-8.
- Lilie, Ralph-Johannes; Ludwig, Claudia; Pratsch, Thomas; Zielke, Beate (2013). Prosopographie der mittelbyzantinischen Zeit Online. Berlin-Brandenburgische Akademie der Wissenschaften. Nach Vorarbeiten F. Winkelmanns erstellt (in German). Berlin and Boston: De Gruyter.
- Skoulatos, Basile (1980). Les personnages byzantins de l'Alexiade: Analyse prosopographique et synthèse [The Byzantine Personalities of the Alexiad: Prosopographical Analysis and Synthesis] (in French). Louvain-la-Neuve and Louvain: Bureau du Recueil Collège Érasme and Éditions Nauwelaerts.
- Trapp, Erich; Beyer, Hans-Veit; Walther, Rainer; Sturm-Schnabl, Katja; Kislinger, Ewald; Leontiadis, Ioannis; Kaplaneres, Sokrates (1976–1996). Prosopographisches Lexikon der Palaiologenzeit (in German). Vienna: Verlag der Österreichischen Akademie der Wissenschaften. ISBN 3-7001-3003-1.
- Verpeaux, Jean, ed. (1966). Pseudo-Kodinos, Traité des Offices (in French). Paris: Centre National de la Recherche Scientifique.
