= Cretan expedition (843) =

843 Byzantine invasion of Crete

- Part of the Arab–Byzantine wars
- Map of the Arab–Byzantine naval conflict in the Mediterranean, 7th–11th centuries
Date	18 March 843
Location	Crete
Result	Cretan victory

Belligerents
Byzantine Empire	Emirate of Crete

Commanders and leaders
Theoktistos; Sergios Niketiates #	Abu Hafs

Strength
Large	Unknown

The Cretan expedition occurred in early 843, when the Byzantine army invaded the island of Crete, which was held by the Arabs. The expedition was initially successful but ended in a fiasco later.

== Background ==
On 824 or 827, Andalusian fugitives were expelled from Alexandria and left for the island of Crete. The fugitive leader, Abu Hafs, occupied the island. He founded the city of Chandax, which became its capital. The Byzantines were aware of the danger Crete poses to them. Soon they dispatched an expedition led by Damianos and Photenious but were defeated. Another expedition was launched in 828. Led by Krateros, the Byzantines were defeated, and Krateros was killed.

== Expedition ==
In the year 843, another expedition was launched after the death of Emperor Theophilos. This expedition was launched by Theoktistos and Sergios Niketiates. This expedition involved a large number of troops and ships, which were possibly prepared at the time of Theophilos, despite there being no evidence for it. On Sunday, March 18, of the same year, the expedition left Constantinople. Details of this expedition are short. As soon as the Byzantines arrived on Crete, the Arabs, who could not resist and match their strength, were alarmed. The easy landing of the Byzantines showed that the island possibly wasn't in full control by the Arabs. Instead of resisting, the Arabs bribed some Byzantine officers to spread a rumor that Theodora was planning to depose Theoktisos, who was the co-regent of Michael III. This forced him to leave his troops and sail for Constantinople. Niketiates was left to lead the army but died, possibly by natural causes. The Byzantine troops, leaderless, were subsequently massacred by the Arabs.

== Aftermath ==
After his defeat, the Byzantines shifted their attention towards Sicily, which was being conquered by the Aghlabids for the next 70 years. This led them to remain inactive against the Cretan Arabs, fighting back against their raids but making no attempt to recapture the island.

== Sources ==
- Georgios Theotokis & Mamuka Tsurtsumia (2025), Nikephoros II Phokas and Warfare in the 10th-Century Byzantine World.
- Dimitrios Tsougarakis (1988), Byzantine Crete from the 5th century to the Venetian Conquest.
- John Bagnell Bury (1965), A History of the Eastern Roman Empire from the Fall of Irene to the Accession of Basil I. (A.D. 802–867).
