= Krateros (disambiguation) =

Krateros (Greek: Κρατερός) was a leading general of Alexander the Great.

Krateros may also refer to:

- Krateros (strategos of the Cibyrrhaeots), Byzantine admiral in the 820s
- Theodore Krateros, Byzantine general in the 830s, one of the 42 Martyrs of Amorium
