= Constantine Doukas (disambiguation) =

Constantine X Doukas (1006–1067) was emperor of the Byzantine Empire from 1059 to 1067.

Constantine Doukas or Constantine Ducas may also refer to:

- Constantine Doukas (usurper) (died 913), Byzantine general
- Constantine Doukas (co-emperor), Byzantine co-emperor, son of Emperor Michael VII Doukas
- Constantine Doukas (died 1179), Byzantine general and governor
- Constantine Makrodoukas (died 1185), Byzantine nobleman and general
- Constantine Angelos Doukas, Byzantine usurper against Isaac II Angelos in 1193
- Constantine Komnenos Doukas, ruler of Acarnania and Aetolia from 1215 to after 1242
- Constantine Doukas of Thessaly, ruler of Thessaly from 1289 to 1303
- Constantine Ducas (Moldavian ruler), prince of Moldavia in 1693–1695 and 1700–1703
