= Siege of Ragusa =

Siege of Ragusa may refer to:

- Siege of Ragusa (866–868), the unsuccessful Aghlabid siege of a Byzantine city
- Siege of Ragusa (1806), the unsuccessful Russo-Montenegrin siege of a French-held city
- Siege of Ragusa (1814), the successful Anglo-Austrian siege of a French-held city

== See also ==
- Siege of Dubrovnik (1991–1992)
