= Shu'ayb ibn Umar =

Second Emir of Crete from c. 855 to c. 880

Abu ʿAmr Shuʿayb ibn ʿUmar ibn ʿIsā al-Balluti, also Saet (Greek: Σαήτ) or Saïpes (Σαΐπης) in the Byzantine sources, was the second Emir of Crete, ruling c. 855 – c. 880.

The surviving records on the internal history and rulers of the Emirate of Crete are very fragmentary. Shu'ayb was the son of the conqueror of Crete and founder of the Emirate of Crete, Abu Hafs Umar. Following the studies of George C. Miles with the aid of numismatic evidence, his reign is tentatively placed from c. 855 to c. 880, although a gold dinar struck in his name is dated as late as 894/5. Shu'ayb is also commonly identified with the "Saet" or "Saïpes" of the Byzantine chroniclers, Theophanes Continuatus, John Skylitzes, and Genesios.

The Byzantine chroniclers report that in c. 872/3, he sent the renegade Photios to raid the Byzantine Empire, leading to the two heavy defeats of the Cretans at Kardia and the Gulf of Corinth at the hands of the Byzantine admiral Niketas Ooryphas. These Byzantine victories apparently led to a temporary truce, and it appears that Shu'ayb was obliged to pay tribute to Byzantium for about a decade. Two of Shu'ayb's sons, Umar and Muhammad, succeeded him.

== Sources ==
- Canard, M. (1971). "Iḳrīṭis̲h̲". In Lewis, B.; Ménage, V. L.; Pellat, Ch. & Schacht, J. (eds.). The Encyclopaedia of Islam, Second Edition. Volume III: H–Iram. Leiden: E. J. Brill. pp. 1082–1086. OCLC 495469525.
- Lilie, Ralph-Johannes; Ludwig, Claudia; Pratsch, Thomas; Zielke, Beate (2013). Prosopographie der mittelbyzantinischen Zeit Online. Berlin-Brandenburgische Akademie der Wissenschaften. Nach Vorarbeiten F. Winkelmanns erstellt (in German). Berlin and Boston: De Gruyter.
- Miles, George C. (1964). "Byzantium and the Arabs: Relations in Crete and the Aegean Area". Dumbarton Oaks Papers. 18: 1–32. doi:10.2307/1291204. JSTOR 1291204.
- Wortley, John, ed. (2010). John Skylitzes: A Synopsis of Byzantine History, 811–1057. Cambridge: Cambridge University Press. ISBN 978-0-521-76705-7.

Preceded by Abu Hafs Umar al-Iqritishi	Emir of Crete c. 855 – c. 880	Succeeded by Umar ibn Shu'ayb
