= Dalmatia (theme) =

Province of the Byzantine Empire

Coordinates: 43.8167°N 16.2167°E

Theme of Dalmatia Θέμα Δαλματίας
- Theme of the Byzantine Empire
- c. 870 – 1060s
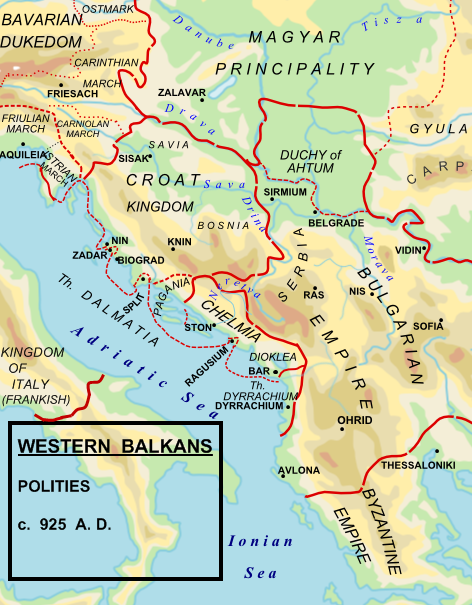
- Map of the Balkans in 925 AD
- Capital: Zadar
- Historical era: Middle Ages
  - Establishment as a theme.: c. 870
  - Collapse of Byzantine control.: 21 August 1060

The Theme of Dalmatia (Greek: θέμα Δαλματίας/Δελματίας, thema Dalmatias/Delmatias) was a Byzantine theme (a military-civilian province) on the eastern coast of the Adriatic Sea in Southeastern Europe, headquartered at Jadera (later called Zara, today's Zadar).

== Origins ==
After the fall of the Western Roman Empire, Dalmatia came under Byzantine control in the 530s, when the generals of Emperor Justinian I (r. 527–565) seized it from the Ostrogoths in the Gothic War. The invasions of the Avars and Slavs in the 7th century destroyed the main cities and overran much of the hinterland, with Byzantine control limited to the islands and certain new coastal cities -with local autonomy and called Dalmatian city-states- such as Spalatum (Split) and Ragusium (Dubrovnik), while Jadera (Zadar) became the local episcopal and administrative center, under an archon.

These coastal cities were the refuge of the autochthonous Dalmatian neolatins, who created the original eight Dalmatian city-states: (Vecla (now Krk), Crespa (now Cres), Arba (now Rab), Jadera, Tragurium (now Trogir), Spalatum, Ragusium and Cattaro (now Kotor)). Bishops of four Dalmatian cities (Kotor, Split, Rab, Osor) took part at the Seventh Ecumenical Council (787).

At the turn of the 8th to 9th century, Dalmatia was seized by Charlemagne (r. 768–814), but he returned it to the Byzantines in 812, after the so-called "Pax Nicephori". It is unclear whether the region was under actual rather than nominal Byzantine authority after that; the local Latin cities appear to have been virtually independent. Nevertheless, an archon of Dalmatia is mentioned in the 842/843 Taktikon Uspensky, and a seal of a "strategos of Dalmatia" dated to the first half of the century may indicate the existence of a Dalmatian theme, at least for a short time.

== History ==
The traditional date of the establishment of Dalmatia as a regular theme is placed in the early years of the reign of Emperor Basil I the Macedonian (r. 867–886), following the expeditions of Niketas Oryphas.

Byzantium, the Roman Pope and the Franks vied for the support of the Slavs in Dalmatia; in 878 AD, Zdeslav of Croatia was a noted Byzantine vassal, who deposed and was in turn deposed in a power struggle involving these powers. With the fall of the Carolingian Empire, the Franks ceased to be a major power in the Adriatic, while the Republic of Venice grew in power in Dalmatia, beginning with Doge Pietro Tradonico. Since the time of Duke Branimir of Croatia, Venetians had to pay taxes to Croatia and to the Narentines for their ships traveling along the eastern Adriatic coast, while the Dalmatian city-states paid 710 ducats of tribute to the Croatian ruler.

Around 923 AD, Tomislav of Croatia, the Byzantine emperor and the two church patriarchs were involved a deal that transferred the control of the Byzantine Dalmatian cities to the new Croatian kingdom. This started a series of similar maneuvers and the Croatian–Bulgarian Wars, during which the Byzantine emperors of the Macedonian dynasty maintained varying degrees of control over the Dalmatian cities. The Church also endured an analogous internal conflict between the rival dioceses of Spalatum and Nin. Between 986 and 990, due to active alliance against Samuil of Bulgaria who also attacked Dalmatia up to Jadera, king Stephen Držislav was compensated and awarded by Emperor Basil II the titles of patriarch and eparch, which gave him formal authority over the Theme of Dalmatia (but some historians believe not over the Dalmatian city-states). According to Thomas the Archdeacon, Stephen Držislav received royal insignia and the titles as an act of recognition from the Byzantine Emperor, becoming reges Dalmatie et Chroatie and his descendants having the same titles. The Venetian maritime power was obstructed by the Narentines and the Croats until Pietro II Orseolo who successfully intervened in 998 and 1000, and arranged two important royal marriages with both the Croats and the Byzantines. Under Domenico I Contarini, Venice retook Jadera.

Croatia again had a period of control over the theme and Dalmatian city-states under Peter Krešimir IV. By 1069 he expanded the kingdom on land and on sea calling the Dalmatian sea and islands as "ours", had the Byzantine Empire recognize him as supreme ruler of the theme, and consolidated his holdings as the regnum Dalmatiae et Chroatia. The 1074 invasion of the Normans partly shifted the balance of power as count Amico of Giovinazzo invaded Dalmatia from southern Italy, on behalf of the Dalmatian cities and Byzantines. Amico also besieged Rab for almost a month (late April to early May). He failed to take the island, but he manage to take island Cres and capture the Croatian king himself who died in Norman prison by November 1074. In February 1075 the Venetians banished the Normans and secured the Dalmatian cities for themselves. The doge Domenico Selvo self-titled himself as the doge of "Venice, Dalmatia and Croatia" (later only of "Dalmatia"), but did not have nominal power over Dalmatia and Croatia. In October 1075 was crowned Demetrius Zvonimir as the king of "Croatia and Dalmatia" by the Holy See and his power was felt even on the island of Krk and Cres. His death in 1089 caused succession crisis in Croatia and Dalmatia, but although doge Vitale I Michiel made with Coloman, King of Hungary agreement of 1098—the so-called Conventio Amicitiae—determined the spheres of interest of each party by allotting the coastal regions of Croatia to Hungary and Dalmatia to the Republic of Venice, Coloman in 1105 successfully conquered coastal cities of Dalmatia.

=== Southern Dalmatia ===
In the south of the Dalmatia Theme, the city of Ragusa, one of the main Dalmatian city-states but still under Byzantine control, started to grow in importance, and its Church diocese was elevated to an archbishopric in 998 AD.

In the early 11th century, Byzantine control over the eight Dalmatian city-states started to be contested by the Serb principality of Dioclea, whose ruler Jovan Vladimir took control of Bar, near the border with the Theme of Dyrrhachium. His feats were repeated and bested by Stefan Vojislav twenty years later, and in 1034 AD, the Bar diocese was elevated to an archdiocese, but a war with Theophilos Erotikos soon followed. Stefan Vojislav's son Mihailo obtained papal support following the East–West Schism of 1054, further weakening Byzantine influence in Dalmatia.

Except for Ragusium and the southern third of Dalmatia, Byzantine control collapsed in the 1060s. Constantine Bodin pledged his support for Pope Urban II, which confirmed Bar's status as an archdiocese in 1089 AD, and resulted in a temporary demotion of the Ragusan diocese. By the end of the 11th century, the Kingdom of Hungary took the Kingdom of Croatia's place in controlling the northern Dalmatian hinterland. Duklja remained largely under Byzantine control, with a series of internal conflicts weakening its leaders.

=== Later ===
Byzantine predominance was restored under Emperor Manuel I Komnenos (r. 1143–1180), but vanished after his death and was replaced by Venetian control. With the rise of Stefan Nemanja, the Nemanjić dynasty took control of the lands in the south of coastal Dalmatia, while nearly all the Dalmatian islands and coastal north-central Dalmatia was under full Venetian control since the 15th century and remained an area of the Venetian Stato da Mar until 1797 (see Venetian Dalmatia).

Byzantine governors of Dalmatia were styled as dukes (pl. of Byzantine Greek "δούξ", doux), a title derived from Latin dux. In the 1170s, the duke was Constantine Doukas.

== See also ==
- Dalmatian city-states
- Venetian Dalmatia
- De Administrando Imperio

== Sources ==
- Fine, John Van Antwerp Jr. (1991) [1983]. The Early Medieval Balkans: A Critical Survey from the Sixth to the Late Twelfth Century. Ann Arbor: University of Michigan Press.
- Kazhdan, Alexander, ed. (1991). The Oxford Dictionary of Byzantium. Oxford and New York: Oxford University Press. ISBN 0-19-504652-8.
- Komatina, Predrag (2017). "Dalmatian bishops at the Council of Nicaea in 787 and the status of the Dalmatian church in the eighth and ninth centuries". Imperial Spheres and the Adriatic: Byzantium, the Carolingians and the Treaty of Aachen (812). London; New York: Routledge. pp. 253–260.
- Moravcsik, Gyula, ed. (1967) [1949]. Constantine Porphyrogenitus: De Administrando Imperio (2nd revised ed.). Washington D.C.: Dumbarton Oaks Center for Byzantine Studies.
- Nesbitt, John; Oikonomides, Nicolas, eds. (1991). Catalogue of Byzantine Seals at Dumbarton Oaks and in the Fogg Museum of Art, Volume 1: Italy, North of the Balkans, North of the Black Sea. Vol. 1. Washington, DC: Dumbarton Oaks Research Library and Collection. ISBN 0-88402-194-7.
- Ostrogorsky, George (1956). History of the Byzantine State. Oxford: Basil Blackwell.
- Živković, Tibor (2008). Forging unity: The South Slavs between East and West 550-1150. Belgrade: The Institute of History, Čigoja štampa. ISBN 9788675585732.
- Živković, Tibor (2008). "Uspenskij's Taktikon and the Theme of Dalmatia". Byzantina Symmeikta. 17: 49–87. doi:10.12681/byzsym.918.
