= Battle of Kardia =

870s battle

- Part of the Arab–Byzantine wars
- Map of the Arab–Byzantine naval conflict in the Mediterranean, 7th–11th centuries
Date	c. 872/3
Location	off Kardia, in the Gulf of Saros (modern-day Turkey) 40.55°N 26.75°E
Result	Byzantine victory

Belligerents
Byzantine Empire	Emirate of Crete

Commanders and leaders
Niketas Ooryphas	Photios

Strength
Unknown	Over 50 vessels (27 koumbaria, many lighter galleys)

Casualties and losses
Unknown	20 vessels
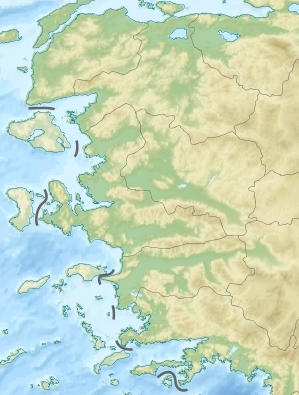
- Location within Western Turkey Battle of Kardia (Balkans)

The Battle of Kardia was a naval battle fought in c. 872/3 between the fleets of the Byzantine Empire and the Cretan Saracens off Kardia, in the Gulf of Saros. The battle was a major Byzantine victory.

According to the 10th-century chronicler Theophanes Continuatus—whose work was later reused almost without change by the 11th-century historian John Skylitzes—in the early years of the reign of the Emperor Basil I the Macedonian (r. 867–886), the Arab emir of Crete, Shu'ayb ("Saet" in Greek), son of the founder of the emirate, Abu Hafs, sent a Greek renegade called Photios, "a warlike and energetic fellow", on a major raiding expedition against the Byzantine Empire. The fleet led by Photios comprised over 50 vessels, including 27 heavy vessels (koumbaria) and many lighter galleys.

This fleet plundered the shores of the Aegean Sea, looting and taking prisoners to be sold as slaves, and even penetrated into the Propontis and reached Prokonnesos, in the vicinity of Constantinople; the first time since the Second Arab Siege of Constantinople in 717–718 that a Muslim fleet had come so close to the Byzantine capital. The Byzantine response was headed by the droungarios of the Fleet, Niketas Ooryphas, who met the Saracen fleet in battle off Kardia, in the Gulf of Saros. The battle was a major victory for the Byzantines, who destroyed twenty Saracen vessels through the use of Greek fire, and forced the rest to flee back to Crete.

Some time after this defeat, Photios led another raid against Greece, but Ooryphas once again caught up with him and destroyed his fleet, killing Photios. The dating of these events is unclear; Ekkehard Eickhoff (Seekrieg und Seepolitik zwischen Islam und Abendland, 1966) and Dimitris Tsoungarakis (Byzantine Crete: From the 5th Century to the Venetian Conquest, 1988) place the battle at Kardia in 872, while Warren Treadgold (A History of the Byzantine State and Society) and John Pryor and Elizabeth Jeffreys (The Age of the ΔΡΟΜΩΝ: The Byzantine Navy ca. 500–1204) place it in c. 873.

== Sources ==
- Canard, M. (1971). "Iḳrīṭis̲h̲". In Lewis, B.; Ménage, V. L.; Pellat, Ch. & Schacht, J. (eds.). The Encyclopaedia of Islam, Second Edition. Volume III: H–Iram. Leiden: E. J. Brill. pp. 1082–1086. OCLC 495469525.
- Lilie, Ralph-Johannes; Ludwig, Claudia; Pratsch, Thomas; Zielke, Beate (2013). Prosopographie der mittelbyzantinischen Zeit Online. Berlin-Brandenburgische Akademie der Wissenschaften. Nach Vorarbeiten F. Winkelmanns erstellt (in German). Berlin and Boston: De Gruyter.
- Pryor, John H.; Jeffreys, Elizabeth M. (2006). The Age of the ΔΡΟΜΩΝ: The Byzantine Navy ca. 500–1204. Leiden and Boston: Brill Academic Publishers. ISBN 978-90-04-15197-0.
- Treadgold, Warren (1997). A History of the Byzantine State and Society. Stanford, California: Stanford University Press. ISBN 0-8047-2630-2.
- Wortley, John, ed. (2010). John Skylitzes: A Synopsis of Byzantine History, 811–1057. Cambridge: Cambridge University Press. ISBN 978-0-521-76705-7.
