= Battle of Thasos =

829 battle

Battle of Thasos (829)
- Part of the Arab–Byzantine wars
- Map of the Arab–Byzantine naval conflict in the Mediterranean, 7th–11th centuries
Date	October 829
Location	Off Thasos
Result	Cretan victory

Belligerents
Byzantine Empire	Emirate of Crete

Strength
Uknown	Unknown

Casualties and losses
Almost all	Unknown

The Battle of Thasos was fought on October 829, between the fleets of the Byzantine Empire and the newly founded Emirate of Crete.

== Background ==
On 824 or 827, Andalusian fugitives were expelled from Alexandria and left for the island of Crete. The fugitive leader, Abu Hafs, occupied the island. He founded the city of Chandax, which became its capital. The Byzantines were aware of the danger Crete poses to them. Soon they dispatched two expeditions in 826 and 828 but were defeated.

In 829, after the death of the Byzantine emperor Michael II, the Arabs became a serious threat to Byzantium. They ravaged the coasts of Asia Minor, devastated the maritime part of the Thracian theme, and took the population captive. The Arabs even advanced as far as Mount Iatros, famous for its monasteries.

== Battle and Aftermath ==
In October of 829, a Byzantine imperial fleet during this time was returning from Sicily. They encountered the Cretan Arabs off the island of Thasos. The Cretan Arabs scored a major victory: Theophanes Continuatus records that almost the entire imperial fleet was lost. This success opened up the Aegean to the Saracens' raids. The Cyclades and other islands were pillaged, and Mount Athos was so devastated that it was deserted for a long time.

== Bibliography ==
- Treadgold, Warren (1988). The Byzantine revival, 780-842. Stanford University Press.
- Vasilev, Alexander (1935). Byzance et les Arabes. Bruxelles : Institut de philologie et d'histoire orientales.
- Bury, John (1965). A History of the Eastern Roman Empire from the Fall of Irene to the Accession of Basil I. (A.D. 802-867). Stanford University Press.
