= Photios (Emirate of Crete) =

Photios (Greek: Φώτιος, fl. c. 872/3) was a Byzantine renegade and convert to Islam who served the Emirate of Crete as a naval commander in the 870s.

Photios appears briefly in the narrative of the 10th-century chronicler Theophanes Continuatus, whose work was later reused almost without change by the 11th-century historian John Skylitzes. The Byzantine chroniclers call Photios "a warlike and energetic fellow", and report that he served the Arab emir of Crete, Shu'ayb ("Saet" in Greek). In c. 872 or 873, Shu'ayb sent Photios to command a major naval raiding expedition against the Byzantine Empire, ruled at the time by Emperor Basil I the Macedonian (r. 867–886). With over 50 vessels, Photios devastated the shores of the Aegean Sea, reaching even as far as Prokonnesos, in the vicinity of Constantinople— the first time since the Second Arab Siege of Constantinople in 717–718 that a Muslim fleet had come so close to the Byzantine capital—before it was met and heavily defeated at the battle of Kardia by the Byzantine admiral Niketas Ooryphas.

Photios with the remnants of his fleet survived to return to Crete, and some time shortly after—the exact date is unknown, with some scholars placing it as late as 879—launched another expedition, raiding the shores of western Greece. Ooryphas once again sailed to confront him, and managed to surprise and destroy the Cretan fleet at the Gulf of Corinth. Photios was killed, and many of the Saracens were captured and tortured to death.

== Sources ==
- Canard, M. (1971). "Iḳrīṭis̲h̲". In Lewis, B.; Ménage, V. L.; Pellat, Ch. & Schacht, J. (eds.). The Encyclopaedia of Islam, Second Edition. Volume III: H–Iram. Leiden: E. J. Brill. pp. 1082–1086. OCLC 495469525.
- Lilie, Ralph-Johannes; Ludwig, Claudia; Pratsch, Thomas; Zielke, Beate (2013). Prosopographie der mittelbyzantinischen Zeit Online. Berlin-Brandenburgische Akademie der Wissenschaften. Nach Vorarbeiten F. Winkelmanns erstellt (in German). Berlin and Boston: De Gruyter.
- Wortley, John, ed. (2010). John Skylitzes: A Synopsis of Byzantine History, 811–1057. Cambridge: Cambridge University Press. ISBN 978-0-521-76705-7.
