= Battle of the Gulf of Corinth =

Naval battle during the Arab–Byzantine wars

- Part of the Arab–Byzantine wars
- Map of the Arab–Byzantine naval conflict in the Mediterranean, 7th–11th centuries
Date	c. 873
Location	Gulf of Corinth, Greece
Result	Byzantine victory

Belligerents
Byzantine Empire	Emirate of Crete

Commanders and leaders
Niketas Ooryphas	Photios †

The Battle of the Gulf of Corinth was fought in c. 873 between the fleets of the Byzantine Empire and the Cretan Saracens in the Gulf of Corinth. The Byzantines under Niketas Ooryphas managed to surprise the Saracens, resulting in a major Byzantine victory.

According to the 10th-century chronicler Theophanes Continuatus—whose work was later reused almost without change by the 11th-century historian John Skylitzes—in the early years of the reign of the Emperor Basil I the Macedonian (r. 867–886) the Arab emir of Crete, Shu'ayb ("Saet" in Greek), son of the founder of the emirate, Abu Hafs, sent a Greek renegade called Photios, "a warlike and energetic fellow", on major raiding expeditions against the Byzantine Empire. The first raid was defeated by the droungarios of the Fleet, Niketas Ooryphas, at the Battle of Kardia (c. 872/3).

Photios with the remnants of his fleet survived to return to Crete, and some time shortly after—probably c. 873, although some scholars place it as late as 879—launched another expedition, raiding the shores of the Peloponnese. Ooryphas once again led a fleet to meet the Saracens. Aided by favourable wind, he arrived at the harbour of Kenchreai on the northeastern Peloponnese within a few days. There he learned that the Saracens had moved south and west around the Peloponnese, raiding Methone, Pylos, and Patras, and entered the Corinthian Gulf to raid the western approaches of Corinth. Following them by circumnavigating the Peloponnese would take time, and Ooryphas was unwilling to risk allowing them to escape. Thus, according to the Byzantine historians, he decided to haul his ships over the Isthmus of Corinth into the Corinthian Gulf. This was done, and the Byzantine fleet fell upon the Saracens, who were caught completely off guard. He destroyed many of their ships and killed many of the raiders, including Photios, while many others were captured and—especially the Christian renegades among them—tortured to death in various ways.

Historian David Pettegrew has cast doubt on the historicity of this event, pointing out that Ooryphas' portage of his fleet over the Isthmus is the first and only such recorded event after the 1st century BC, when the diolkos was still active. Given that the portage of entire fleets across the Isthmus was considered even in Antiquity an extraordinary feat, and was hardly possible to be carried out in such short time as to surprise a fleet anchored near Corinth, Pettegrew suggests that Ooryphas' portage and victory must be considered more a literary topos evoking Classical models, specifically Philip V of Macedon's similar action while campaigning against the Illyrians in 217 BC, rather than an actual event.

== Sources ==
- Lilie, Ralph-Johannes; Ludwig, Claudia; Pratsch, Thomas; Zielke, Beate (2013). Prosopographie der mittelbyzantinischen Zeit Online. Berlin-Brandenburgische Akademie der Wissenschaften. Nach Vorarbeiten F. Winkelmanns erstellt (in German). Berlin and Boston: De Gruyter.
- Pettegrew, David K. (2011), Basil's Thunderbolt: Niketas Ooryphas and the Portage of the Corinthian Isthmus, Paper presented at the 37th Byzantine Studies Conference, Chicago, Illinois
- Wortley, John, ed. (2010). John Skylitzes: A Synopsis of Byzantine History, 811–1057. Cambridge: Cambridge University Press. ISBN 978-0-521-76705-7.
