= Battle of Ophlimus =

Battle between Byzantine and Sasanian empire

- Part of the Byzantine–Sasanian War of 602–628 and the Heraclius' campaign of 622
| Date | August 622 |
| Location | Mount Ophlimus |
| Result | Byzantine victory |

Belligerents
| Byzantine Empire | Sasanian Empire |

Commanders and leaders
| Heraclius | Shahrbaraz |

Strength
| Unknown | Unknown |

The Battle of Ophlimus was a clash between the Byzantine army under Emperor Heraclius and the Sasanian army under Shahrbarāz, ending in victory for the Byzantines.

== Background ==
General Shahrbarāz, following his successful conquest of Egypt, assumed command of the Sasanian Persian forces, which were stationed not far from the Byzantine positions. While the exact size of his army remains unknown, Byzantine Emperor Heraclius feared a Persian advance before he could fully consolidate his troops. Heraclius' route has been the subject of historical debate; some scholars suggest that he first reached an unidentified location near Caesarea in Cappadocia, though it is more widely believed that he marched directly east towards Pontus. During his advance, Heraclius' forces encountered a small contingent of Arab allies of the Persians, capturing their leader and others. These captives, later freed by Heraclius, were incorporated into the Byzantine military, demonstrating Heraclius' strategy of encouraging defections from the Persian side as a means of weakening their forces without necessarily seeking open battle.

== Battle ==
Shahrbarāz sought to block Heraclius' advance into the eastern passes by positioning his forces near Hellenopontus, west of Euchaita. However, Heraclius managed to outmaneuver the Persians, positioning his troops behind their lines—a fact that went unnoticed by the Persian army for nearly two weeks. In response, the Persians looted and burned Euchaita, including its religious sites such as the martyrium of St. Theodore the Recruit. This tactical maneuver by Heraclius, described in poetic terms by the historian George of Pisidia, involved complex feints and reversals that caught the Persian forces off-guard. Shahrbarāz attempted a counter-maneuver to outflank the Byzantines, culminating in a failed night assault, hindered by limited visibility due to a waning moon. Despite the Persians' preference for fighting in rough terrain, Heraclius positioned his forces strategically on open ground, prompting a standoff.

Eventually, a defector from the Persian side, who later returned and was executed for desertion, underscored the fragility and internal challenges facing the Sasanian forces. The climactic battle, likely occurring in late autumn of 622, saw Heraclius employing a ruse to lure the Persians from their hidden positions. Feigning a retreat with a small force, Heraclius prompted the Persians to break cover and pursue, at which point his elite unit, the Optimates, launched a decisive assault, inflicting significant losses.

== Aftermath ==
Following their defeat, the Persians withdrew from the region, marking a temporary victory for the Byzantines. However, broader strategic challenges remained unchanged. Heraclius returned to Constantinople later that summer due to escalating threats from the west, particularly from the Avars in the Balkans. While these victories did not dramatically shift the overall strategic balance, they provided a crucial morale boost for Heraclius' troops and the Byzantine populace.
