= Constantine Doukas (sebastos) =

Byzantine general and provincial governor

The sebastos Constantine Doukas (Greek: Κωνσταντίνος Δούκας; died 8 April 1179) was a Byzantine general and provincial governor under Emperor Manuel I Komnenos. His relation with the prestigious Doukas family is unknown. What little is known of him comes from a short biographical notice in a manuscript (Par. gr. 1564, fol. 18r). According to it, in 1173 Emperor Manuel sent Constantine to help defend Ancona in Italy, a Byzantine ally, against a combined attack from Holy Roman Emperor Frederick I Barbarossa and the Republic of Venice. The siege lasted for seven months, but Constantine successfully defended the city from capture. Subsequently, he was sent as governor (doux) in Dalmatia and Dyrrhachium. He died of pleurisy at his home on 8 April 1179.

== Sources ==
- Polemis, Demetrios I. (1968). The Doukai: A Contribution to Byzantine Prosopography. London: The Athlone Press. OCLC 299868377.
