= Cretan expedition (828) =

828 Byzantine invasion of Crete

- Part of the Arab–Byzantine wars
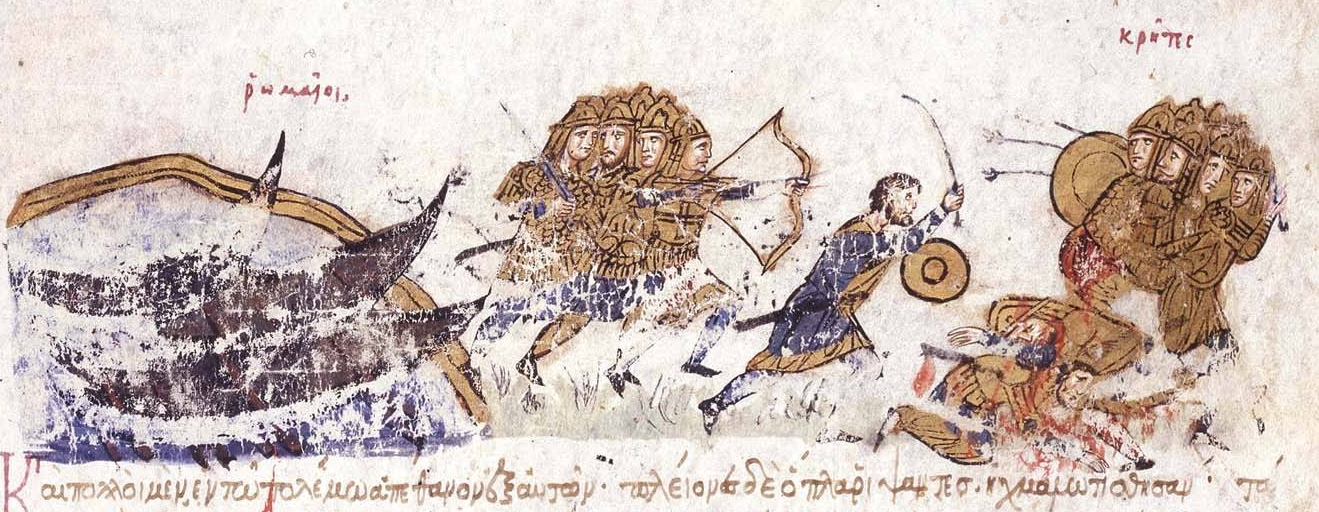
- The rout of the Cretans by the Byzantines
Date	Autumn 828
Location	Crete
Result	Cretan victory

Belligerents
Byzantine Empire	Emirate of Crete

Commanders and leaders
Craterus †	Abu Hafs

Strength
70 ships	Unknown

Casualties and losses
Heavy	Heavy

The Cretan expedition occurred in Autumn 828, where the Byzantine army invaded the island of Crete which was held by the Arabs. The expedition ended in fiasco for the Byzantine army.

== Background ==
On 824 or 827, Andalusian fugitives were expelled from Alexandria and left for the island of Crete. The fugitive leader, Abu Hafs occupied the island. He founded the city of Chandax which became its capital. The Byzantines were aware of the danger Crete poses to them. Soon they dispatched an expedition led by Damianos and Photenious but were defeated.

== Expedition ==
In Autumn of 828, the Byzantine emperor, Michael II, dispatched another fleet of 70 ships under the strategos of the Cibyrrhaeots, Craterus. The Byzantines landed at Amnisos where the Arabs were waiting for them. A bloody and fierce battle ensued on the coast where the Byzantines routed the Arabs, killing and taking many prisoners. Those who survived the battle escaped to Chandax. The Byzantines, instead of following up their success, chose to establish their camp and celebrate their victory. They neglected the defense of their camp. At the night, the Arabs launched a sortie against the sleeping Byzantines who were taken by surprise. The Byzantines were subsequently massacred and their ships were captured. Craterus escaped on a merchant ship. However; the Arabs chased him to the island of Kos where he was captured and crucified.

== Aftermath ==
It became clear after this victory that the Arabs had come to inhabit Crete. That year, 828, they had total control over the island. The battle changed the naval balance of power in the Eastern Mediterranean and the Arabs made frequent and destructive assaults against the coastlines of the Aegean Sea.

== Sources ==
- John Bagnell Bury (1965), A History of the Eastern Roman Empire from the Fall of Irene to the Accession of Basil I. (A.D. 802-867).
- The English Historical Review (1913), Volume 28.
- Josiah Burchett (1720), A Complete History of the Most Remarkable Transactions at Sea, from the Earliest Accounts of Time to the Conclusion of the Last War with France.
- Z. N. Brooke (1923), The Cambridge Medieval History: The Eastern Roman empire (717-1453).
