= Cretan expedition (949) =

Invasion of Crete by the Byzantine army 949

- Part of the Arab–Byzantine wars
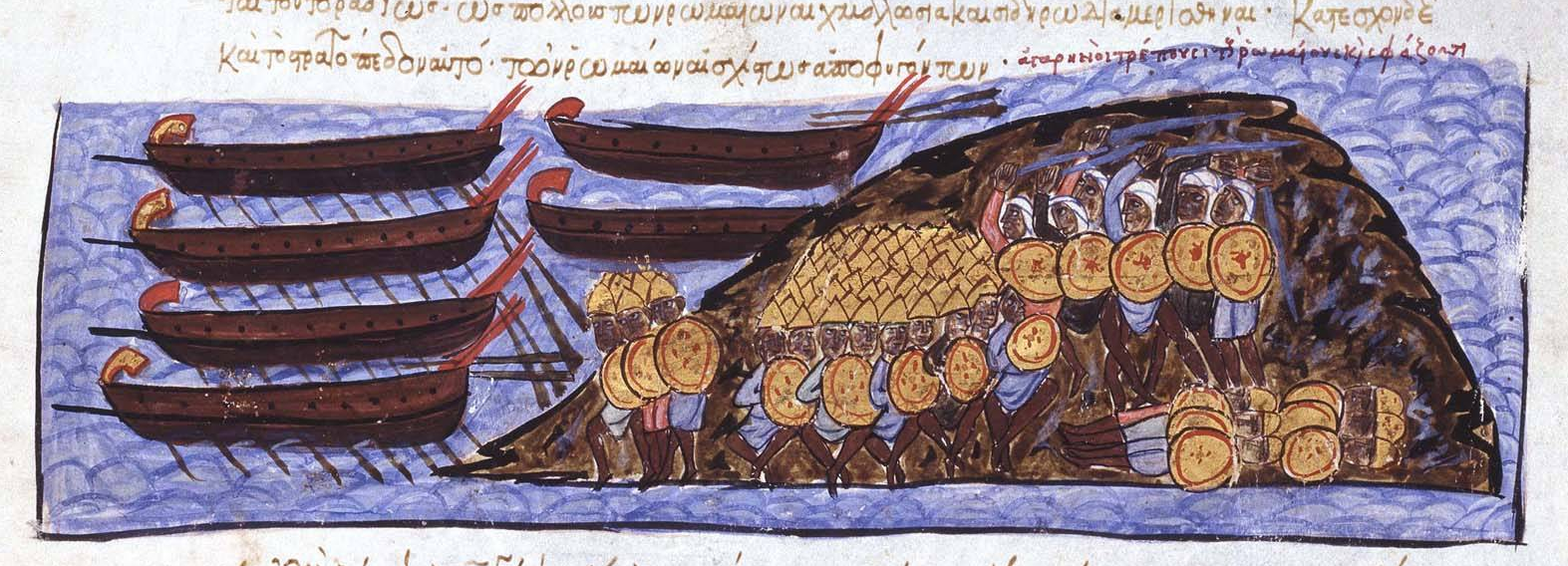
- The defeat of the Byzantines in 949
| Date | August 949 |
| Location | Crete |
| Result | Cretan victory |

Belligerents
| Byzantine Empire | Emirate of Crete |

Commanders and leaders
| Constantine Gongyles | Ali ibn Ahmad |

Strength
| 60 ships 15,700 men or 4,100 men | Unknown |

Casualties and losses
| Heavy | Unknown |

The Cretan expedition occurred in August 949, where the Byzantine army invaded the island of Crete which was held by the Arabs. The expedition ended in fiasco for the Byzantine army.

In 949, the Byzantine emperor, Constantine VII, planned a new campaign to reconquer Crete. Aware of the costly failure of 911 campaign, Constantine planned a minor, cheaper, and more cautious campaign. He deployed fleets to keep an eye over the Aegean and Mediterranean, reaching to Spain and north Africa. With so many ships on guard duty.

In Summer 949, the Byzantine dispatched a fleet of 60 ships consisting of 10,000 marines and 5,700 soldiers and mercenaries. Other source state that the Byzantines had only 4,100 men for the campaign. The expedition was led by the eunuch, Constantine Gongyles. The Byzantine landed on the island without opposition on August 949.

Gongyles failed to fortify his camp or scout the Arabs, which left him exposed. The Arabs launched a surprise counterattack, killing many of the soldiers and capturing the rest along their camp. Gongyles and a small part of his fleet managed to escape this disaster. The failure of the expedition was largely due to Gongyles incompetence.

== Sources ==
- Warren T. Treadgold (1997), A History of the Byzantine State and Society.
- Anthony Kaldellis (2024), The New Roman Empire, A History of Byzantium.
- Charles D. Stanton (2015), Medieval Maritime Warfare.
