= Cretan expedition (826) =

826 Byzantine invasion of Crete

- Part of the Arab–Byzantine wars
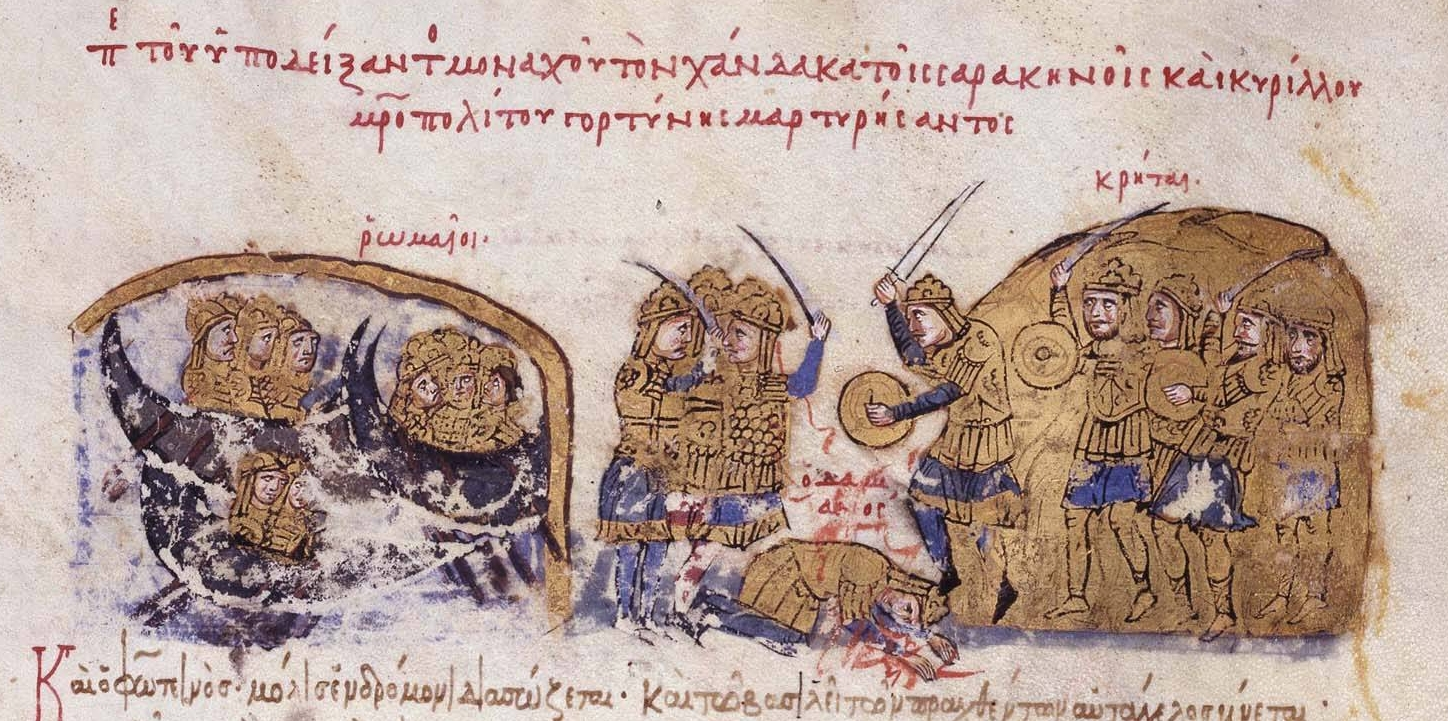
- The Cretan Arabs defeat the Byzantines under Photeinos and Damianos
Date	Early 826
Location	Heraklion, Crete
Result	Cretan victory

Belligerents
Byzantine Empire	Emirate of Crete

Commanders and leaders
Photeinos; Damianos †	Abu Hafs Umar al-Iqritishi

Strength
Unknown	Unknown

The Cretan expedition of 826 was the first of many Cretan expeditions launched by the Byzantine Empire to retake the island of Crete from the Andalusian fugitives. The expedition ended in failure.

== Background ==
An internal crisis in Al-Andalus forced some Arab fugitives numbering 10,000, led by Abu Hafs Umar al-Iqritishi, to escape Spain. They landed in Egypt in 813. However, they were later expelled. Finding nowhere to go, the fugitives set their course to the island of Crete. It's disputed when the Arabs landed in Crete, dates ranging from 823 to 828. Modern historiography argues the year 824 or 825 is the most plausible. The Arab conquest of the island was gradual. The Arabs also began establishing their new settlement. A new fort called Chandax (modern-day Heraklion) was built around a moat trench dug by the Arabs. From there the Arabs began their gradual conquest of Crete.

Hearing of the Arab settlement on the island, the Byzantine emperor appointed Photeinos, strategos of the Anatolic Theme, as the commander of the expedition to drive the Arabs out of Crete. Historians place the expedition in early 826.

== Expedition ==
When the Byzantines arrived on the island, Photeinos assessed the situation and reported to the emperor that the Arabs were in large numbers, requesting additional reinforcements for the mission. While the Byzantines did not know about the Muslim's intention, they must've quickly realized that they were not dealing with a raid but rather an attempted conquest. Since local forces were weak in dealing with the Arabs, the Byzantines had to intervene. The Byzantine emperor dispatched Damianos, the head of the imperial stables, with strong additional reinforcements.

After the arrival of Damianos, Photeinos believed he had enough force to confront the Arabs. The Byzantines then marched to attack the Arabs on land near Chandax, which was unfinished at the time. They launched their first assault on the Arabs. The battle was fierce but ended in favor of the Arabs. Damianos was killed, and the Byzantine army disintegrated and routed. Photeinos survived the battle by escaping on a boat off Chandax towards the island of Dia. The Arabs managed to capture the majority of the Byzantine ships.

== Sources ==
- Warren Treadgold (1988), The Byzantine revival, 780-842.
- Georgios Theotokis & Mamuka Tsurtsumia (2025), Nikephoros II Phokas and Warfare in the 10th-Century Byzantine World.
- John Bagnell Bury (1912), A History of the Eastern Roman Empire from the Fall of Irene to the Accession of Basil I. (A. D. 802-867).
- Theocharēs Eustratiou Detorakēs (1994), History of Crete.
- Juan Signes Codoñer (2016), The Emperor Theophilos and the East, 829–842, Court and Frontier in Byzantium During the Last Phase of Iconoclasm.
- Francis Dvornik (1893), The Legends of Constantine and Methodius Seen from Byzantium (In French).
