= Photeinos (strategos) =

9th-century Byzantine military governor

Photeinos (Greek: Φωτεινός) was a Byzantine commander and governor active in the 820s.

He is first mentioned following the Muslim conquest of the island of Crete in the mid-820s. At the time, he was military governor (strategos) of the Anatolic Theme, and was entrusted by Emperor Michael II the Amorian (reigned 820–829) with recovering the island. Upon his request, he was later reinforced with troops under the protospatharios Damian. Both were defeated by the Arabs, however: Damian fell, and Photeinos was barely able to escape with his life.

Despite this failure, he was soon entrusted with another important mission, being sent to Sicily as its strategos to counter the rebellion and defection of the local tourmarches Euphemius to the Aghlabids of Ifriqiya. He was probably the successor of the strategos Constantine Soudas, whom Euphemius had killed, but some scholars equate the two men. Greek historian Christos Makrypoulias on the other hand estimates that this is highly unlikely, and that he must have been appointed strategos in Sicily before the expedition to Crete. Nothing is known of him after his dispatch to the island.

Photeinos was also the great-grandfather of Zoe Karbonopsina, the fourth wife of Emperor Leo VI the Wise (r. 886–912).

== Sources ==
- Lilie, Ralph-Johannes; Ludwig, Claudia; Zielke, Beate; Pratsch, Thomas, eds. (2013). "Prosopographie der mittelbyzantinischen Zeit Online". Prosopographie der mittelbyzantinischen Zeit Online. Berlin-Brandenburgische Akademie der Wissenschaften. Nach Vorarbeiten F. Winkelmanns erstellt (in German). De Gruyter.
- Makrypoulias, Christos G. (2000). "Byzantine Expeditions against the Emirate of Crete c. 825–949". Graeco-Arabica. 7–8: 347–362.
