= Siege of Ragusa (866–868) =

- Part of the Arab–Byzantine wars
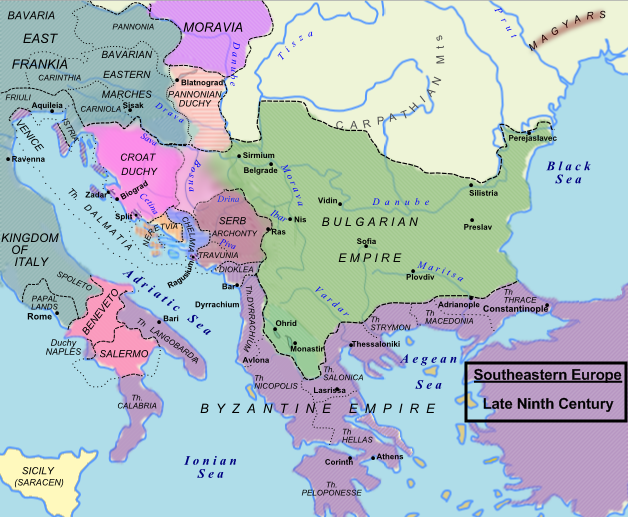
- Political map of the Balkans and southern Italy in the late 9th century
| Date | 866–868 |
| Location | Ragusa, Dalmatia 42°38′25″N 18°06′30″E |
| Result | Byzantine-Ragusan victory |
| Territorial changes | Restoration of Byzantine control over Dalmatia |

Belligerents
| Ragusa; Byzantine Empire | Aghlabid Emirate of Bari |

Commanders and leaders
| Niketas Ooryphas | Sawdan of Bari; Saba of Taranto; Kalfun the Berber |

Strength
| Unknown (Ragusa); 100 ships (Byzantines) | 36 ships |
- Location within Croatia Siege of Ragusa (866–868) (Mediterranean)

The siege of Ragusa (modern Dubrovnik in Croatia) by the Aghlabids of Ifriqiya lasted for fifteen months, beginning in 866 until the lifting of the siege upon the approach of a Byzantine fleet in 868. The failure of the siege and the re-appearance of the Byzantines in the region of Dalmatia signalled the beginning of new aggressive western policy by the new Byzantine emperor, Basil I. Its immediate effects were the re-establishment of Byzantine authority there in the form of the Theme of Dalmatia, and the beginning of the Christianization of the Slavs of the western Balkans, but within a few years it led to renewed Byzantine involvement and presence in southern Italy as well.

== Background ==
At the beginning of the reign of Basil I the Macedonian in 867, Byzantine authority over Sicily and southern Italy had been much diminished due to the expansion of the Aghlabids of Ifriqiya; likewise, in the western Balkans, the local Slavic tribes—the Croats, Serbs, Zachlouboi, Terbounites, Kanalites, Diocletians, and Rhentanoi—had thrown off Byzantine suzerainty and re-asserted their independence. As a result, the Adriatic Sea fell prey to both Slavic and Saracen pirates, the former operating from the shores of Dalmatia and the latter from their southern Italian bases at Bari, Taranto, and Brindisi.

== Siege and aftermath ==
According to Basil I's grandson, the 10th-century emperor Constantine VII Porphyrogennetos, in 866 the Aghlabids launched a major seaborne campaign against the coasts of Dalmatia, with 36 ships under the command of "Soldan" (Sawdan, the Aghlabid emir of Bari), Saba of Taranto, and Kalfun the Berber. The Aghlabid fleet plundered the cities of Boutova (Budva), Rhosa (Risan), and Dekatera (Kotor), before going on to lay siege to Ragusa (Dubrovnik). The Ragusans managed to resist the Aghlabid siege for fifteen months, but as their strength declined, they sent envoys to Constantinople to seek assistance. Emperor Basil agreed to help them, and equipped a fleet of reportedly 100 ships, under the command of the experienced and capable patrikios Niketas Ooryphas. On learning of his approach from some deserters, the Saracens abandoned the siege and returned to Bari.

This expedition was the first example of the new, assertive foreign policy that Basil favoured in the West. Ooryphas' "showing of the flag" had swift results, as the Slavic tribes sent envoys to the Emperor, once more acknowledging his suzerainty. Basil dispatched officials, agents and missionaries to the region, restoring Byzantine rule over the coastal cities and regions in the form of the new theme of Dalmatia, while leaving the Slavic tribal principalities of the hinterland largely autonomous under their own rulers; the Christianization of the Slavic tribes also began at this time.

To secure his Dalmatian possessions and control of the Adriatic, Basil realized that he had to neutralize the Saracen bases in Italy. To this end, in 869, Ooryphas led another fleet, including ships from Ragusa which ferried Slavic contingents, in a joint effort to capture Bari with Louis II of Italy. Although this attempt failed, two years later Bari fell to Louis. Finally, in 876 the city came under Byzantine control, forming the capital and nucleus of a new Byzantine province, the later theme of Longobardia. This began a more than decade-long Byzantine offensive that restored imperial control over most of southern Italy, that would last until the 11th century.

== Sources ==
- Kreutz, Barbara M. (1996). Before the Normans: Southern Italy in the Ninth and Tenth Centuries. Philadelphia: University of Pennsylvania Press. ISBN 0-8122-1587-7.
- Metcalfe, Alex (2009), The Muslims of medieval Italy, Edinburgh: Edinburgh University Press, ISBN 978-0-7486-2008-1
- Moravscik, Gyula; Jenkins, R.J.H., eds. (1967). Constantine Porphyrogenitus: De Administrando Imperio. Washington, DC: Dumbarton Oaks. ISBN 0-88402-021-5.
- Nicol, Donald M. (1988). Byzantium and Venice: A Study in Diplomatic and Cultural Relations. Cambridge: Cambridge University Press. ISBN 0-521-34157-4.
- Wortley, John, ed. (2010). John Skylitzes: A Synopsis of Byzantine History, 811–1057. Cambridge: Cambridge University Press. ISBN 978-0-521-76705-7.
