= Cretan expedition (911–912) =

Byzantine invasion of Crete (911–912)

- Part of the Arab–Byzantine wars
- Map of the Arab–Byzantine naval conflict in the Mediterranean, 7th–11th centuries
Date	October 911 – April 912
Location	Crete
Result	Cretan victory

Belligerents
Byzantine Empire	Emirate of Crete

Commanders and leaders
Himerios	Yusuf ibn Umar ibn Shu'ayb

Strength
177 ships 47,129 men	Unknown

Casualties and losses
Heavy	Unknown

The Cretan expedition occurred between 911 and 912, when the Byzantine army invaded the island of Crete to recapture it, which was held by the Arabs. The expedition ended in failure for the Byzantine army.

== Background ==
After Arabs from Andalusia took over Crete in 824, it developed into the Arab Emirate of Crete and a base for corsairs that pillaged Byzantium's coastline. Without success, the Empire attempted to retake Crete several times. Emperor Leo VI chose the patrician Himerios to lead a new campaign against Crete in the 910s. The Byzantine navy had 177 and consisted of 34,200 oarsmen, 7140 soldiers, 700 Rus, and 5089 Mardaite merecenaries.

== Expedition ==
The expedition set sail from Constantinople on October, 911. The Byzantine landed and besieged the city of Chandax, the capital of the Arabs in Crete. The Byzantines faced difficulties during the siege. The walls of Chandax were heavily fortified and large moat was established along with the stiff resistance by the garrison. In addition to supply problems due to the large number of soldiers in the campaign, the Byzantines were constantly harassed by the Arabs outside of Chandax. The siege lasted for six months.

News soon reached Himerios that the emperor's health was declining, prompting him to raise the siege and return to the capital. On April, 912, the fleet sailed home and arriving at the island of Chios, he was ambushed by an Arab navy led by Leo of Tripoli and Damian of Tarsus. The Cretans pursued the Byzantines and joined with their allies in destroying the Byzantine fleet. Himerios escaped the destruction.

== Sources ==
- Shaun Tougher (1997), The Reign of Leo VI (886–912): Politics and People.
- John Carr (2015), Fighting Emperors of Byzantium.
- John Julius Norwich (1998), A Short History of Byzantium.
- Romilly James Heald Jenkins (1970), Studies on Byzantine History of the 9th and 10th Centuries.
- Christos Makrypoulias (2000), Byzantine Expeditions against the Emirate of Crete c.825-949.
