= Krateros (strategos of the Cibyrrhaeots) =

9th-century Byzantine naval commander

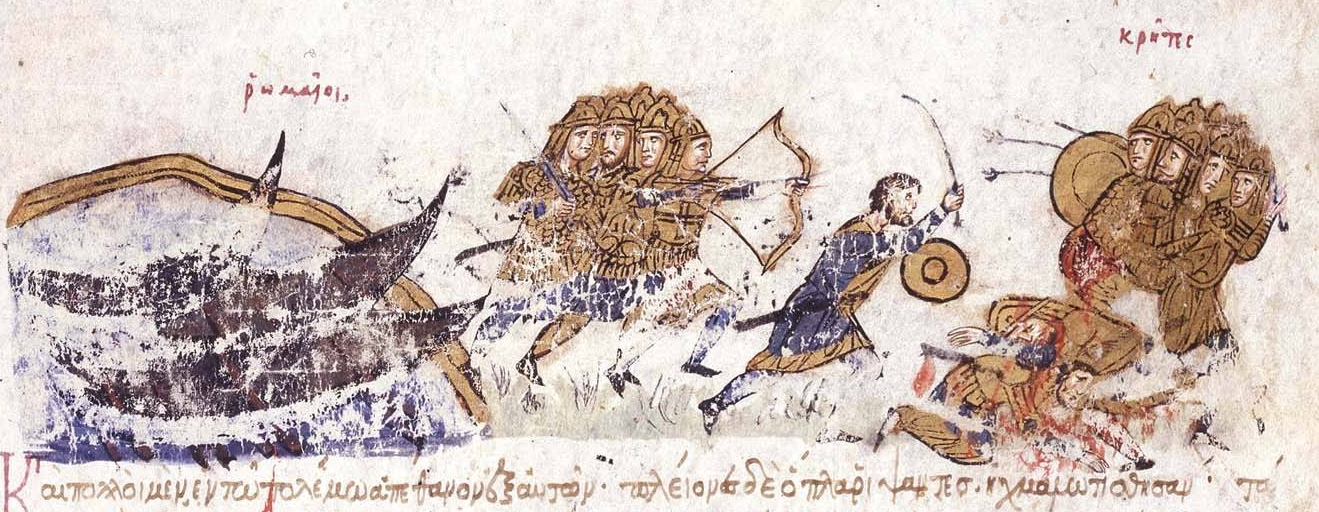
Krateros defeats the Cretan Saracens

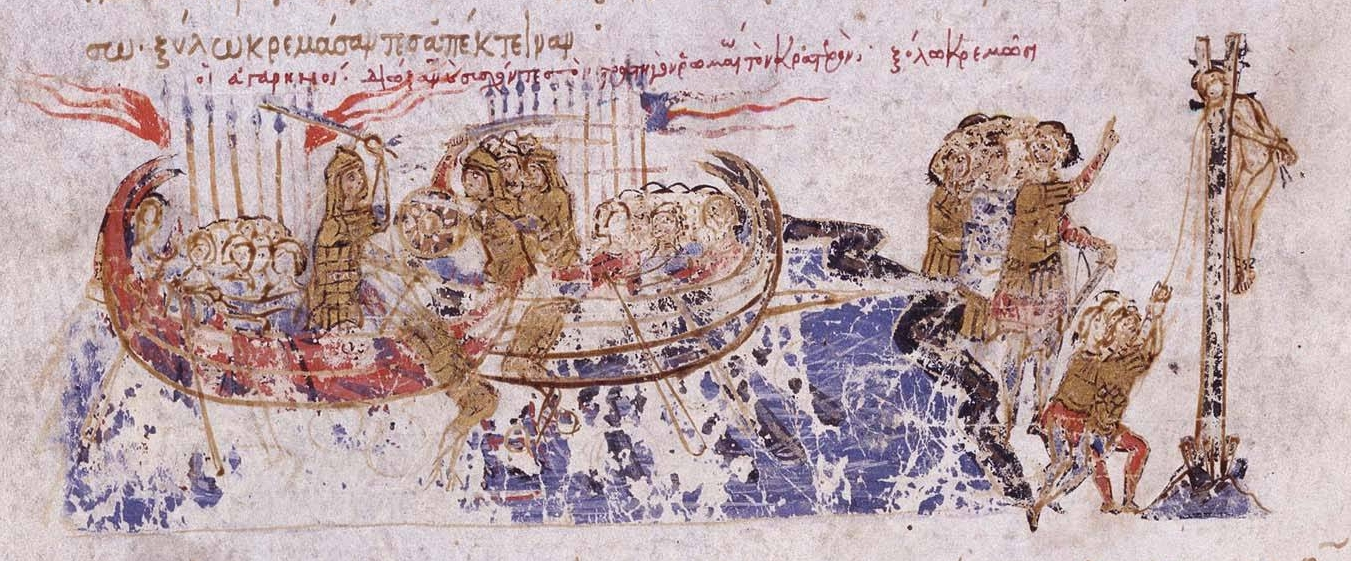
Cretan Saracens pursue Krateros and capture and hang him at Kos

Krateros (Greek: Κρατερός) was a Byzantine naval commander in the 820s.

Very little is known about him. Even his name is unclear, as "Krateros" may be his family name rather than his first name.

In the early 820s, he held the post of strategos (military governor) of the naval Cibyrrhaeot Theme. Following the failure of an expedition under the strategos of the Anatolic Theme Photeinos to recover the island of Crete from the Saracens, Emperor Michael II the Amorian entrusted Krateros with leading another expedition. The new expedition, launched c. 827/829 and numbering seventy ships, was initially victorious, but the overconfident Byzantines were then routed in a night attack. Krateros managed to flee to Kos, but there he was captured by the Arabs and crucified.

He may be identical to another Krateros, who was strategos of the Anatolic Theme in the 810s, but this would represent a demotion.

== Sources ==
- Lilie, Ralph-Johannes; Ludwig, Claudia; Pratsch, Thomas; Zielke, Beate (2013). Prosopographie der mittelbyzantinischen Zeit Online. Berlin-Brandenburgische Akademie der Wissenschaften. Nach Vorarbeiten F. Winkelmanns erstellt (in German). Berlin and Boston: De Gruyter.
- Makrypoulias, Christos G. (2000). "Byzantine Expeditions against the Emirate of Crete c. 825–949". Graeco-Arabica. 7–8: 347–362.
