= Niketas Ooryphas =

Byzantine admiral

Niketas Oöryphas
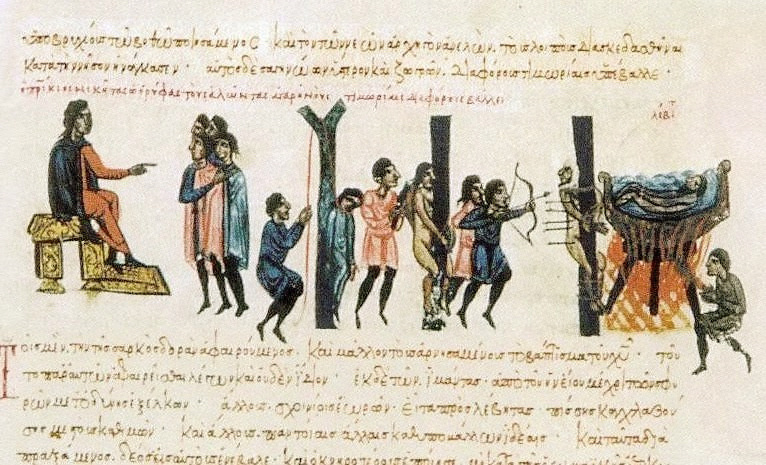
- Ooryphas punishing Saracen captives from Crete from the 12th century Madrid Skylitzes
- Military career
- Allegiance: Byzantine Empire
- Rank: droungarios tou ploïmou
- Conflicts: Byzantine–Arab Wars: Siege of Ragusa (866–868); Battle of Kardia; Battle of the Gulf of Corinth

Niketas Oryphas or Oöryphas (Ancient Greek: Νικήτας ὁ Ὀρύφας or Ὠορυφᾶς, fl. 860–873) was a distinguished Byzantine official, patrikios, and admiral under the Byzantine emperors Michael III (r. 842–867) and Basil I the Macedonian (r. 867–886), who achieved several naval victories against the Cretan Saracen raiders.

== Biography ==
=== Under Michael III ===
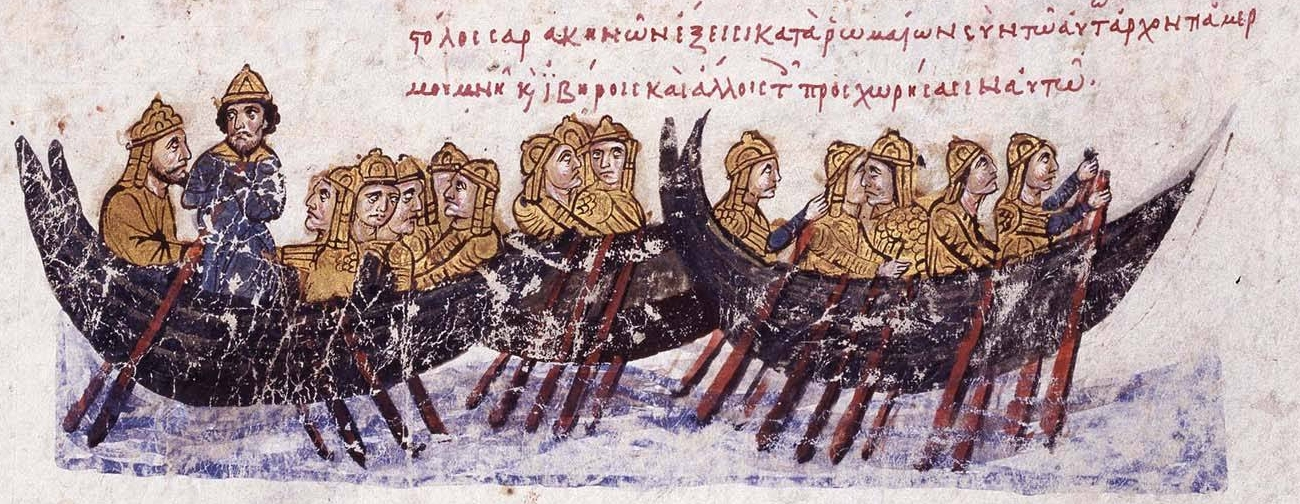
Saracen corsairs, from the Madrid Skylitzes manuscript.

Nothing is known of Niketas Ooryphas's early life. Several people surnamed Ooryphas are recorded in sources during the first half of the 9th century, all of them in high naval positions, but any family relation is conjectural.

Niketas Ooryphas first appears in our sources in 860, as urban prefect of Constantinople, when a Rus' fleet suddenly appeared in the entrance to the Bosporus and started pillaging the city's suburbs. In his capacity as urban prefect, Ooryphas made a report to Emperor Michael III, who was campaigning against the Arabs in Asia Minor. At a subsequent date, he was appointed in a position in the Byzantine navy, and in 867 he was in charge of the Imperial Fleet (droungarios tou ploïmou). As such he sailed with 100 ships in relief of Ragusa against an Arab siege which had already lasted 15 months, and restored the imperial suzerainty over the coasts of Dalmatia. It is, however, possible that Ooryphas already had naval experience, as he may be identifiable with one of the commanders of the 853 attack on Damietta.

=== Under Basil the Macedonian ===
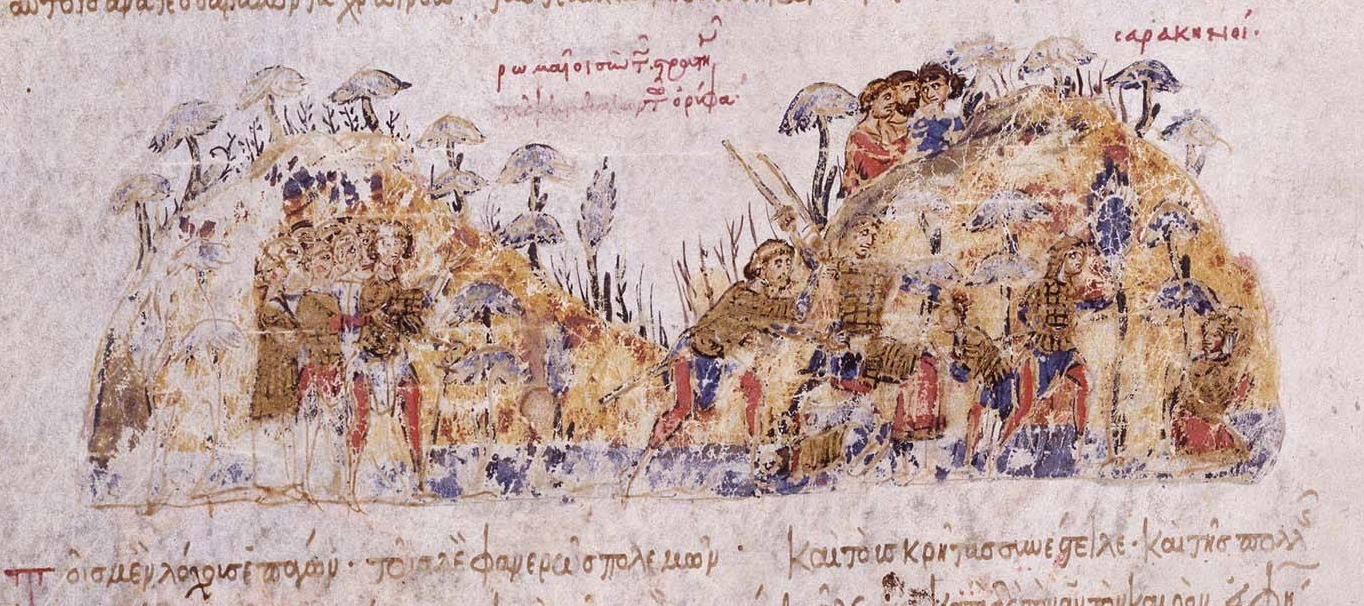
Byzantines under Ooryphas ambushes and defeats the Cretan Saracens.

Although he had risen to high rank under Michael III and had protested the usurpation of the Byzantine throne by Basil I the Macedonian in 867, Ooryphas was quickly won over and retained in office by the latter, and went on to become the perhaps most successful Byzantine admiral of his age.

In 869, Ooryphas led the Byzantine fleet that sailed in support of Louis II who was besieging Bari, but on arriving there, he found the Frankish army dispersed in winter quarters, and caused a diplomatic episode by referring to Louis, who claimed the title of Emperor of the Romans, merely as "king". As a result of the quarrel, the main part of the Byzantine force left, without participating in the siege of the city.

In c. 873, Ooryphas defeated the Cretan Saracens in the Gulf of Saros, and soon after followed this success with another: while the Saracens were campaigning off the western coasts of Greece, he had his men drag his ships overland across the Isthmus of Corinth, thereby surprising the Saracen fleet in the Corinthian Gulf and defeating them. Ooryphas subsequently disappears from the scene, although he may have led the Imperial Fleet in its actions for a few years before being replaced by the droungarios Nasar, including the recapture of Bari and, briefly, of Cyprus.

== Sources ==
- Constantine Porphyrogenitus; Bekkerus, Immanuel (1840). Constantinus Porphyrogenitus: De Thematibus et De Administrando Imperio. Accedit Hieroclis Synecdemus cum Bandurii et Wesselingii Commentariis. Bonn: Impensis Ed. Weberi.
- Jenkins, Romilly (1987). Byzantium: The Imperial Centuries, AD 610–1071. Toronto: University of Toronto Press. ISBN 0-8020-6667-4.
- Pryor, John H.; Jeffreys, Elizabeth M. (2006). The Age of the ΔΡΟΜΩΝ: The Byzantine Navy ca. 500–1204. Leiden and Boston: Brill Academic Publishers. ISBN 978-90-04-15197-0.
- Runciman, Steven (1988) [1929]. The Emperor Romanus Lecapenus and His Reign: A Study of Tenth-Century Byzantium. Cambridge: Cambridge University Press. ISBN 0-521-35722-5.
- Treadgold, Warren (1997). A History of the Byzantine State and Society. Stanford, California: Stanford University Press. ISBN 0-8047-2630-2.
- Lilie, Ralph-Johannes; Ludwig, Claudia; Pratsch, Thomas; Zielke, Beate (2000). "Niketas (#5503)". Prosopographie der mittelbyzantinischen Zeit: 1. Abteilung (641–867), Band 3: Leon (# 4271) – Placentius (# 6265) (in German). Berlin and Boston: De Gruyter. pp. 441–442. ISBN 978-3-11-016673-6.
