= Eustace =

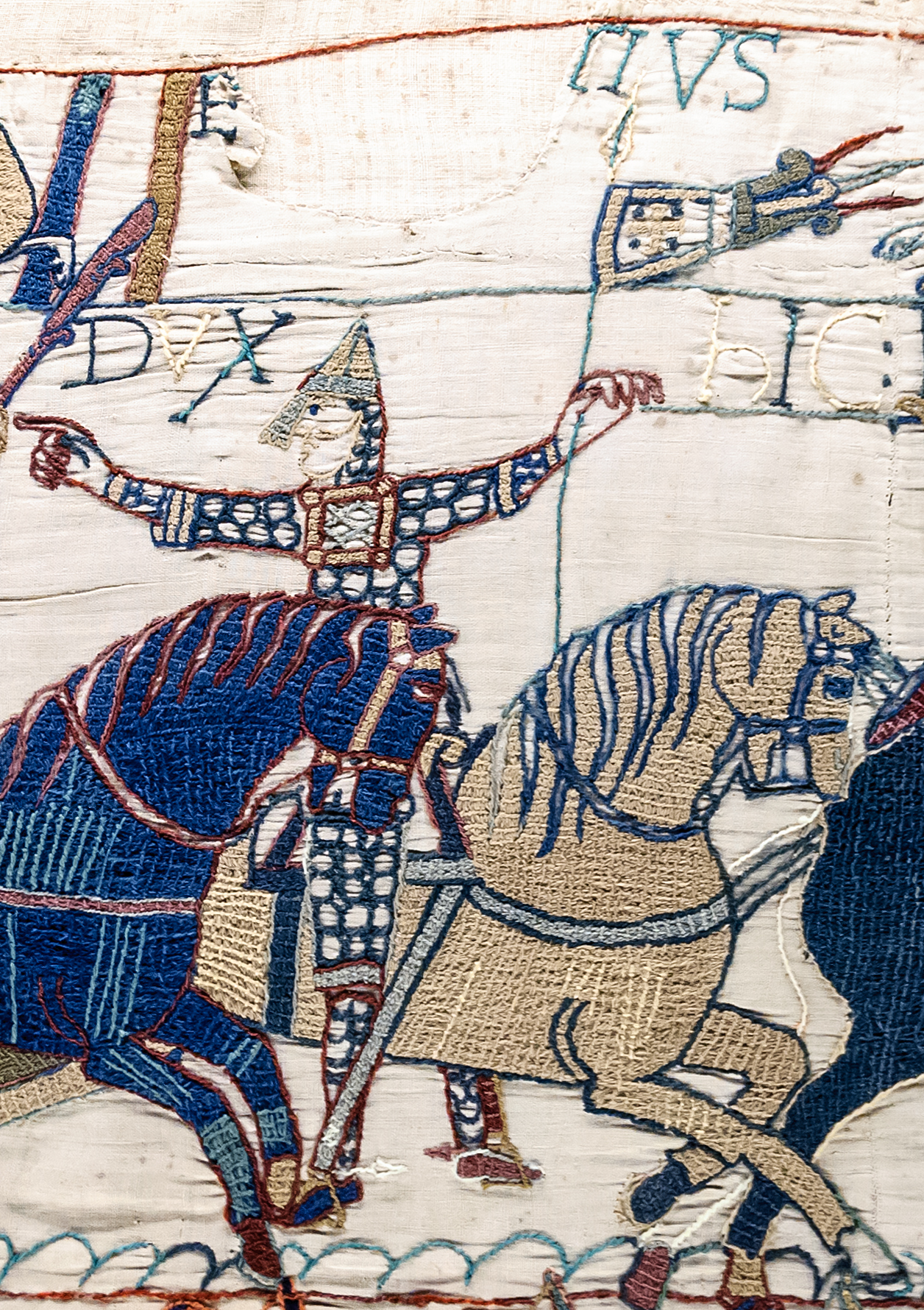
- Eustace II on the Bayeux Tapestry
- Gender: Male
- Languages: Greek, Latin

Origin
- Origin: Greek
- Meaning: English form of Eustachius
- Region of origin: Christianity

Other names
- Usage: English
- See also: Odo, Edward, William, Sigfred

Eustace (/ˈjuːstɪs/ YOOS-tis) is the rendition in English of two phonetically similar Greek given names:

- Εὔσταχυς (Eústachys) meaning "fruitful", "fecund"; literally "abundant in grain"; its Latin equivalents are Faecundus/Fecundus
- Εὐστάθιος (Eustáthios) meaning "steadfast", "stable"; literally "possessing good stability"; its exact Latin equivalents are Constans and its derivatives, Constantius and Constantinus.

Equivalents in other languages include Ostap (Ukrainian, Russian), Eustachy (Polish, Russian), Yevstaphiy (Russian), Eustachio (Italian), Eustache or Eustathe (French), Eustaquio (Spanish), Eustáquio (Portuguese), Eustaqui (Valencian), Ustes (Guyanese) and Eustice (English).

The Greek Eústachys is no longer used; Eustáthios/Ευστάθιος (usually transliterated Efstáthios) on the other hand is still popular and often used in the informal or diminutive Στάθης (Státhis).

Eustis is a variant spelling.

== Notable people with the name ==
=== Given name ===
==== Ancient era ====
- Saint Eustace (died 118), Christian martyr
- Eustathius of Mtskheta (died c. 550), Orthodox Christian saint
- Eustace of Luxeuil (Eustasius) (c. 560 – c. 629), saint and Abbot of Luxeuil

==== Medieval era ====
- Eustace I of Boulogne (died 1049), father of Eustace II
- Eustace II of Boulogne (c. 1015–1020 – c. 1087), companion of William the Conqueror, fought at the Battle of Hastings
- Eustace III of Boulogne (before 1060 – c. 1125), rebelled against King William II of England, son of Eustace II
- Eustace IV of Boulogne (c. 1129 – 1153), eldest son of King Stephen of England
- Eustace (bishop of Ely) (died 1215), Lord Chancellor of England
- Eustace de Balliol (died c. 1209), Lord of Balliol
- Eustace Chapuys (c. 1490/2 – 1556), Ambassador for the Holy Roman Empire in the English Court during the reign of Henry VIII
- Eustace of Fauconberg (died 1228), Bishop of London and Lord High Treasurer
- Eustace Folville (died 1346), English outlaw
- Eustace fitz John (died 1157), magnate in northern England
- Eustace Grenier (died 1123), crusader lord and Constable of the Kingdom of Jerusalem
- Eustace the Monk (c. 1170–1217), mercenary and pirate
- Eustace de Vesci (1169–1216), English lord of Alnwick Castle, leader of the First Baron's War against King John I of England
- Eustache le Peintre de Reims (fl. 1225–40), trouvère
- Eustache de Beaumarchais (died 1294), French soldier
- Eustache de Saint Pierre (fl. 1347), one of the burghers of Calais
- Eustace of Vilnius (died 1347), saint and martyr of the Russian Orthodox Church
- Eustathius of Ethiopia (1273-1352), Ethiopian saint who advocated for Sabbath observance
- Eustache Deschamps (1346–1406/7), French poet
- Eustache Marcadé (died 1440), French playwright

==== Modern era ====
- Eustace Akwei, Ghanaian doctor and politician
- Lord Eustace Cecil (1834–1921), British politician
- Eustace Conway, American naturalist
- Eustace John, Governor-General of Nevis
- Eustace Lycett (1914–2006), British special effects artist
- Eustache Manglé (born 1946), Ivorian footballer
- Eustace Miles (1868–1948), British real tennis player
- Eustace Mullins, American writer
- Eustace George Willis, British politician

=== Surname ===
Eustace is a Dalcassian surname.

- Adam Eustace (born 1979), English rugby union player
- Alan Eustace, American computer scientist, record holder for a Stratosphere Jump
- Arnhim Eustace (born 1944), Vincentian politician, Prime Minister of Saint Vincent and the Grenadines
- Arthur Eustace (1926–2018), New Zealand former sprinter, athletics coach and administrator
- Bartholomew J. Eustace (1887–1956), American Roman Catholic bishop
- Cristina Eustace (born 1979), Mexican singer
- Dudley Eustace, English businessman, director of Dutch companies
- Frank Eustace (1873–1932), American baseball player
- James Eustace, 3rd Viscount Baltinglass (1530–1585), Anglo-Irish Catholic noble rebel
- Jean Eustache (1938–1981), French filmmaker
- John Chetwode Eustace (c.1762–1815), Anglo-Irish Catholic priest and antiquary
- John Eustace (born 1979), English football player
- John Thomas Eustace (1825-1919), politician of the Cape Colony
- Sir Joseph Lambert Eustace (1908–1996), Vincentian educator, businessman and politician
- Katharine Eustace (born 1975), New Zealand skeleton racer
- Mary Jo Eustace (born 1962), Canadian actress, singer and sous chef
- Peter Eustace (born 1944), English football player
- Robert Eustace, pen name of Eustace Robert Barton (1854–1943), English doctor and author
- Rowland Eustace, 2nd Viscount Baltinglass (1505–1578), Anglo-Irish Catholic noble
- Scott Eustace (born 1975), English footballer
- Stuart Eustace (born 1979), English cricketer
- Thomas Eustace, 1st Viscount Baltinglass (c.1480–1549), Anglo-Irish Catholic noble loyalist
- Tim Eustace (born 1956), American chiropractor and politician

== Fictional characters ==
- Eustace Bagge, the farmer from the 1999 TV series Courage the Cowardly Dog
- Sir Eustace Brackenstall, The Adventure of the Abbey Grange by Arthur Conan Doyle
- Commissioner Eustace Dolan, The Spirit 1940s comic strip character
- Ethne Eustace, The Four Feathers
- Eustace Clarence Scrubb, from The Chronicles of Narnia
- Eustace Strytch, from The Adventures of Jimmy Neutron, Boy Genius
- Eustace Tilley, The New Yorker magazine character
- Eustace Wooster, cousin of Bertie Wooster, in P. G. Wodehouse's The Inimitable Jeeves
- Eustace Winner, from Ace Attorney Investigations 2: Prosecutor’s Gambit

== See also ==
- Eustice, a surname
- Maurice Eustace (disambiguation)
