= Eustachius =

Eustachius may refer to:

- Saint Eustace (died 118), latinized as Eustachius, ancient Roman general and Christian martyr
- Eustáquio van Lieshout (1890–1943), also Eustachius, Dutch missionary in Brazil
- Eustachius, religious name of Joseph Kugler (1867–1946), German beatified religious
- Saint Eustachius, bishop of Naples

== See also ==
- Sint Eustatius, Dutch island in the Caribbean
- Bartolomeo Eustachi (c. 1500–1510–1574), anatomist
- Eustasius of Bourges, 6th century Catholic saint, bishop, archbishop, deacon and archdeacon
- Eustathius (disambiguation)
- Eustochius, fifth bishop of Tours from 443 to 460
