= Eustathius =

Eustathius or Eustathios (Greek Εὐστάθιος) is a Greek masculine given name, in English rendered Eustace. It may refer to:

- Saint Eustace, martyr (d. 118)
- Eustathius of Antioch, Patriarch of Antioch (c. 320–c. 330)
- Eustathius of Sebaste, Bishop of Sebastia in Armenia (fl. 350)
- Eustathius of Cappadocia (4th century) Neoplatonist, orator, and diplomat
- Eustathius (consul), Roman consul in 421
- Eustathius of Mtskheta (died 551), Georgian saint
- Eustathius of Epiphania, sixth-century Byzantine historian
- Eustathios (governor of the Cibyrrhaeot Theme), Byzantine governor (fl. ca. 910)
- Eustathios Maleinos (fl. 960s–980s), Byzantine general and magnate
- Eustathios Rhomaios (c. 970–1030), Byzantine jurist
- Eustathios Daphnomeles (fl. early 11th century), Byzantine general
- Eustathius of Constantinople, Ecumenical Patriarch of Constantinople from 1019 to 1025
- Eustathios Palatinos (fl. mid-11th century), Byzantine Catepan of Italy
- Eustathios Kymineianos (1087–1107), Byzantine eunuch
- Eustathios Makrembolites (fl. late 12th century), Byzantine novelist
- Eustathius of Thessalonica (fl. late 12th century), bishop famous for his commentaries on Homer

== See also ==
- Sint Eustatius, a Dutch island in the Caribbean
- Ewostatewos, Ethiopian saint (c. 1273–c. 1352)
- Jevstatije I (fl. late 13th century), Serbian saint
- Jevstatije II (fl. c. 1300), Serbian saint
- Eustace
- Ostap
