= Eustace (disambiguation) =

Eustace is a given and family name.

Eustace may also refer to:

- Eustace, Texas, USA
  - Eustace Independent School District
- Eustace (narrowboat), a boat in the West Country Living Museum, England
- Bishop Eustace Preparatory School, New Jersey
- Eustace Hall, a campus building at Michigan State University
- Eustace, a main character in the animated series Courage the Cowardly Dog

== See also ==
- Eustis (disambiguation)
