= Constantine Diogenes (disambiguation) =

Constantine Diogenes (Greek: Κωνσταντῖνος Διογένης) was a prominent early 11th-century Byzantine general.

Constantine Diogenes may also refer to:

- Constantine Diogenes (son of Romanos IV) (died 1073), grandson of the general
- Constantine Diogenes (pretender), impostor pretender to the Byzantine throne
