= Maurice Eustace =

Maurice Eustace may refer to:

- Maurice Eustace (priest) (died 1581)
- Maurice Eustace (Lord Chancellor) (c. 1590–1665), previously MP for Athy and County Kildare
- Sir Maurice Eustace, 1st Baronet (died 1693), Jacobite MP for Blessington
- Maurice Eustace (Harristown MP) (1637–1703), MP for Knocktopher, and for Harristown

== See also ==
- Eustace (surname)
