= Corycus =

Archaeological site

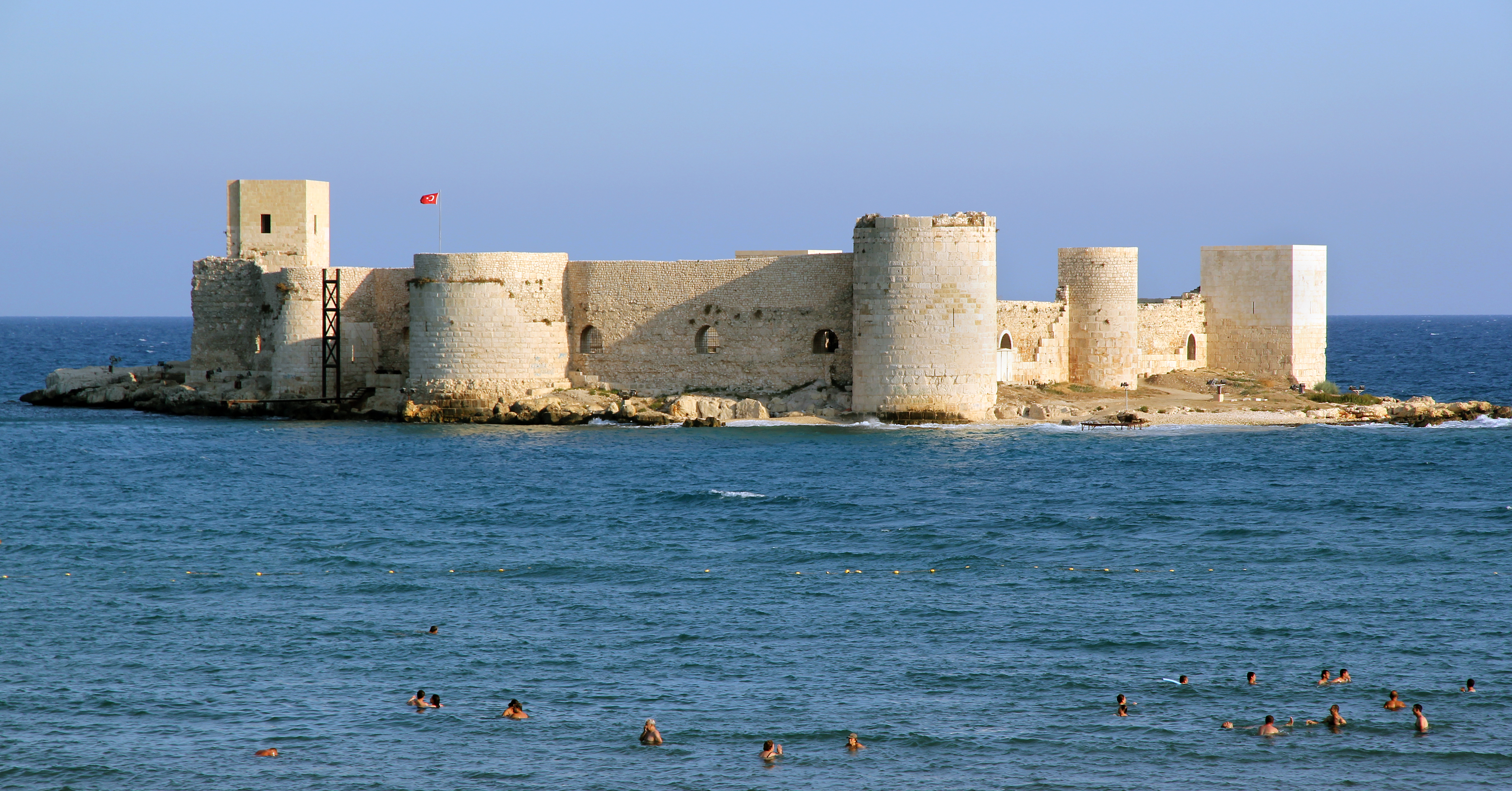
- Fortress of Corycus

- Location within Turkey
- 36°27′55″N 34°9′15″E
- Location: Mersin Province, Turkey

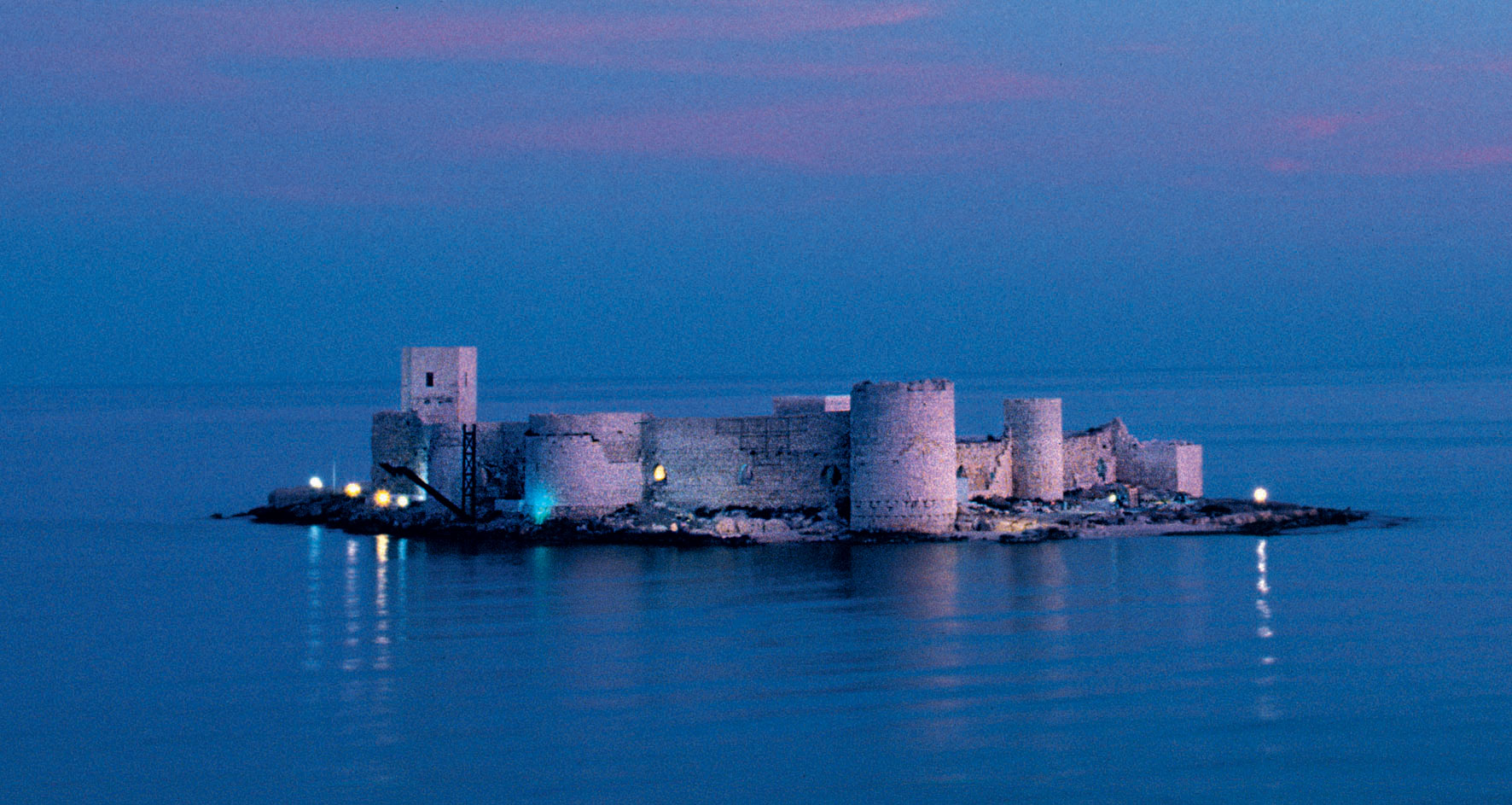
Fortress of Korikos built c. the thirteenth century.

Corycus (Greek: Κώρυκος; also transliterated Corycos or Korykos; Armenian: Կոռիկոս, romanized: Koṙikos; Turkish: Kız Kalesi, lit. "maiden castle") was an ancient city in Cilicia Trachaea, Anatolia, located at the mouth of the valley called Şeytan deresi; the site is now occupied by the town of Kızkalesi (formerly Ghorgos), Mersin Province, Turkey.

== The city ==
=== Antiquity ===
Strabo does not mention a town of Corycus, but reports a promontory so called at the location, but a town Corycus is mentioned by Livy (xxxiii. 20), and by Pliny (v. 27), and Pomponius Mela (i. 13), and Stephanus of Byzantium (s. v. Κώρυκος). In antiquity, Corycus was an important harbor and commercial town. It was the port of Seleucia, where, in 191 BCE, the fleet of Antiochus the Great was defeated by the Romans.

In the Roman times it preserved its ancient laws; the emperors usually kept a fleet there to watch over the pirates. Corycus was also a mint in antiquity and some of its coins survive.

Corycus was controlled by the Byzantine Empire. Justinian I restored the public baths and a hospital.

=== Middle Ages ===
The admiral Eustathios Kymineianos re-fortified the island on the orders of Alexios I Komnenos at the beginning of the 12th century, adding a supplementary castle on a small island. This castle was later called "maidens castle", because it was told that a king held his daughter here in captivity until she was killed by a venomous snake. It was prophesied she would die by a snake bite. So she was taken to the sea castle to protect her, but a serpent was taken by basket to the castle, she was bitten and died. Corycus was conquered by the Armenians soon after it was rebuilt by the Byzantines.

Until the mid-14th century the Armenians held both the mainland and island castles, which guarded this strategic port for the Armenian Kingdom of Cilicia. Simon, the Baron of Koŕikos, attended the coronation of King Levon I in 1198/99. Subsequent Armenian nobles maintained authority in the area (with a few brief interruptions) until 1360, when Peter I, the King of Cyprus, removed the Mamelukes and assumed suzerainty. In the late 14th century it was seized again by the Turks. From 1448 or 1454 it belonged alternately to the Karamanids, the Egyptians, the Karamanids a second time, and finally to the Ottoman Empire.

== Archaeological research ==
Archaeological surveys published in 1982 and 1987 found that the Armenians maintained (with occasional repairs) the mainland castle’s simple Byzantine plan with its rectangular double walls, square towers, and two chapels, all of which were built with masonry taken from the nearby late antique city. The only original Armenian construction is one small chapel. Kizkalesi on the island has the extensive remains of Armenian rebuilding. The island was once connected to the mainland fort by a breakwater.

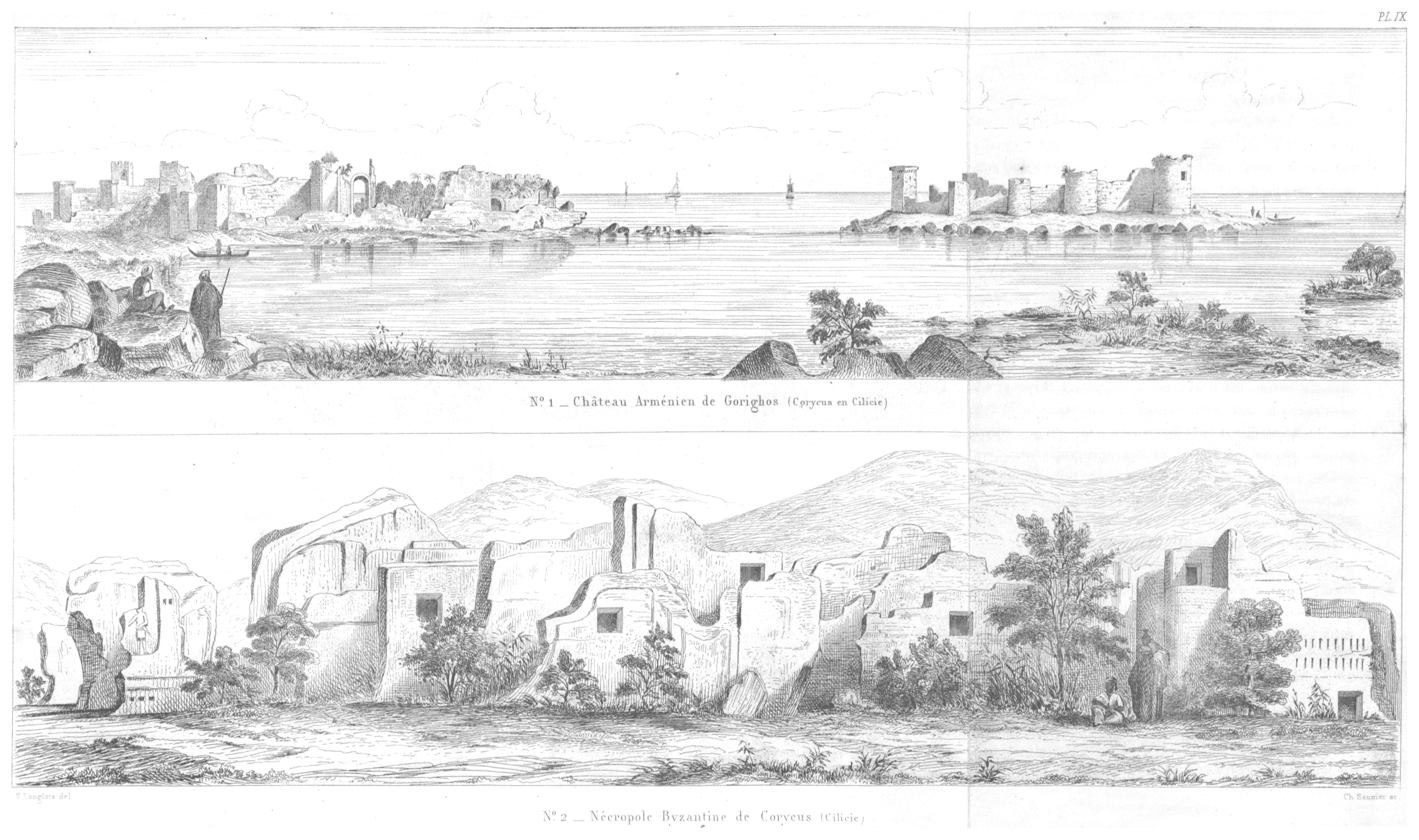
Views of the Fortress and ruins of the town (c. 1860)

The ruins of the city are extensive. Among them are a triumphal arch, a necropolis with a beautiful Christian tomb, sarcophagi, etc. The two medieval castles, one on the shore, the other in an islet, connected by a ruined pier, are partially preserved; the former was reputed impregnable. The walls of the castle on the mainland contain many pieces of columns; and a mole of great unhewn rocks projects from one angle of the fortress about a hundred yards across the bay. Three churches are also found, one decorated with frescoes. The walls of the ancient city may still be traced, and there appear to be sufficient remains to invite a careful examination of the spot.

== Bishopric ==
The city figures in the Synecdemus of Hierocles, and in a Notitia Episcopatuum of about 840. The bishopric of Corycus was a suffragan of Tarsus, the capital of the Roman province of Cilicia Prima, to which Corycus belonged. Of the bishops of the see, Germanus was at the First Council of Constantinople in 381; Sallustius took part in the Council of Ephesus in 431 and a synod held in Tarsus in 434, and was represented at the Council of Chalcedon by his metropolitan bishop Theodorus, who signed the acts of the council on his behalf; Archelaus went to a synod called by Patriarch Menas of Constantinople in 536; Cyprianus was at the Second Council of Constantinople in 553; and Ioannes participated in the Third Council of Constantinople in 680 and the Trullan Council in 692. During the crusades, Corycus was the seat of Latin Church bishops, one of whom, named Gerardus, took part in a council at Antioch in 1136. No longer a residential bishopric, Corycus is today listed by the Catholic Church as a titular see.

Two Armenian inscriptions that were discovered at the castles of Korykos were credited to its construction to Levon I and then to Hetum I.

== Corycian Cave ==
Strabo writes that the Corycian Cave (τὸ Κωρύκιον ἄντρον; now identified with Cennet ve Cehennem) was situated 20 stadia above the promontory of Corycus and was famous for producing the best crocus (saffron). He describes the cave as a great circular hollow surrounded on every side by a high rocky rim. On descending into it, one finds an uneven and mostly rocky floor covered with shrub-like trees, both evergreen and cultivated. Scattered among these are patches where crocus grows. There is also a cave within the hollow containing a large spring, which produces a river of pure and clear water. The river immediately disappears beneath the earth, flows invisibly underground, and eventually emerges into the sea. It is called Picrum Hydor (πικρὸν ὕδωρ; “Bitter Water”).

Stephanus of Byzantium calls it the Corycian Cave of the Nymphs (τὸ Κωρύκιον ἄντρον νυμφῶν) and describes it as a “wondrous marvel” (ἀξιάγαστον θαῦμα), stating that it had the same name as the Corycian Cave on Mount Parnassus. August Meineke proposed placing the words "wondrous marvel" after the reference to Parnassus, since the Corycian Cave on Parnassus was regarded as a natural wonder. Thus, Meineke suggested that the phrase "a wondrous marvel" might refer specifically to the Corycian Cave on Parnassus rather than necessarily describing the Cilician cave. However, modern researchers note that the Cilician cave was also well known, so the description given by Stephanus of Byzantium may indeed refer to the Cilician cave.

Pomponius Mela (i.13) has a long description of the same place apparently from the same authority that Strabo followed, but more embellished. This place is probably on the top of the mountain above Corycus.

This place is famed in Greek mythology. It is the Cilician cave of Pindar (Pythian Ode i. 31), and of Aeschylus (Prom. Vinct. 350), and it is the lair of Zeus' fiercest opponent, the monster Typhon or Typhoeus.

== See also ==
- Kızkalesi, Mersin (current settlement)
- List of Crusader castles

== Gallery ==
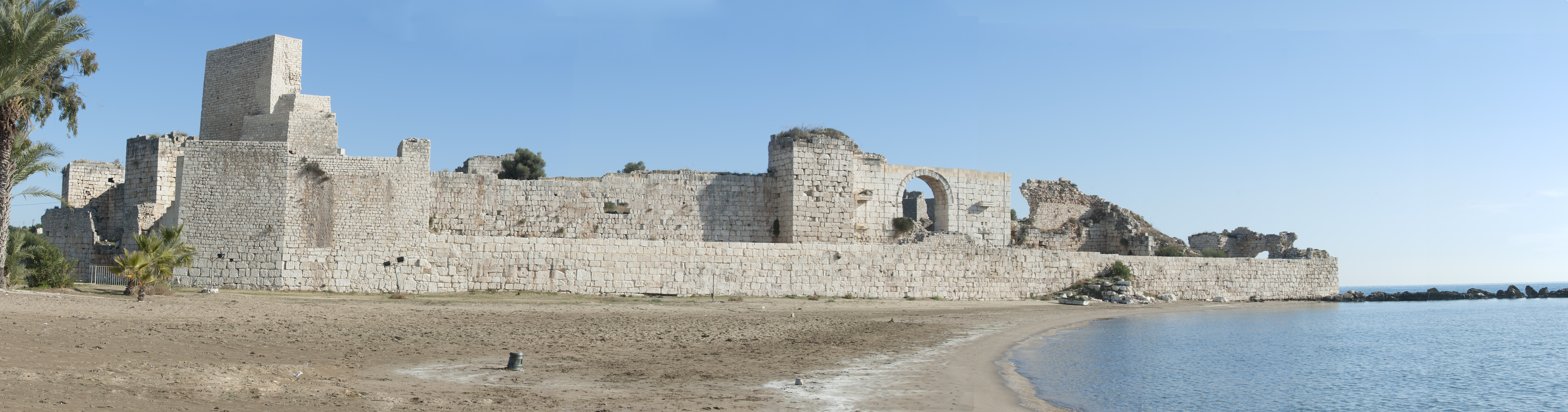
Land castle of Korykos Southwest front

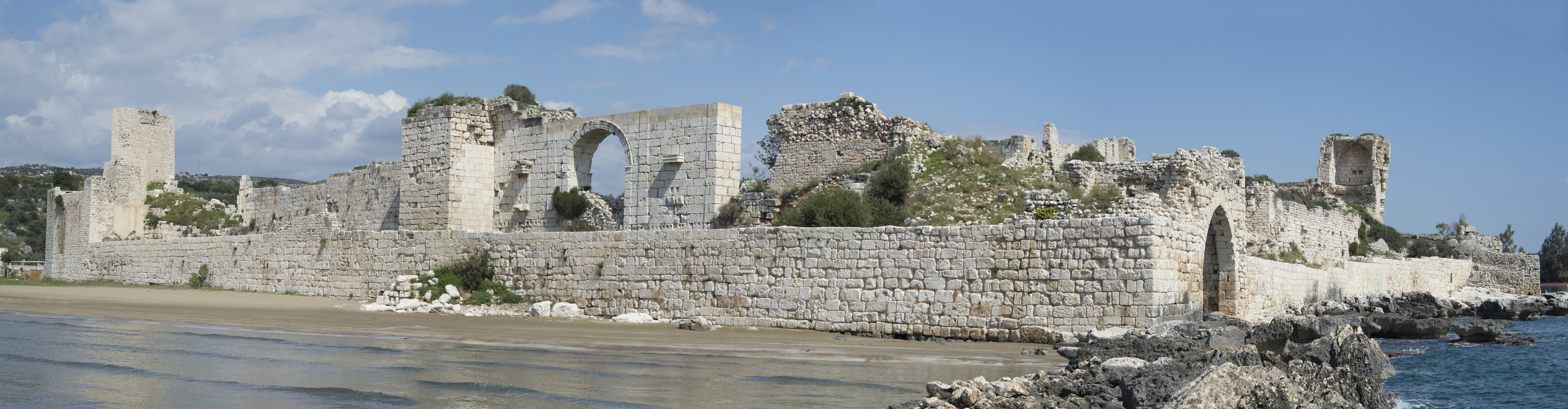
Land castle of Korykos Southwest and southeast front

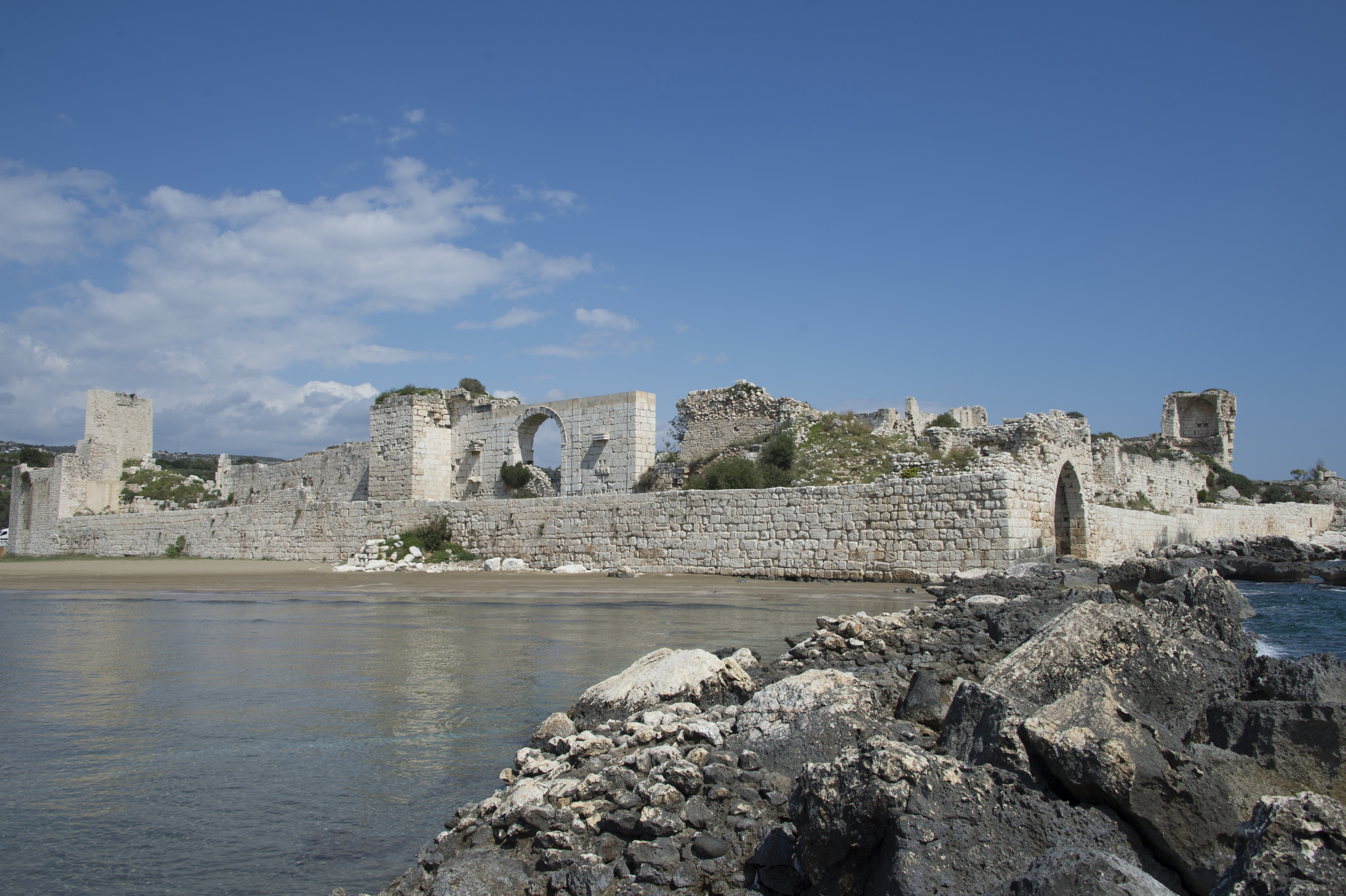
Land castle of Korykos Southwest and southeast front

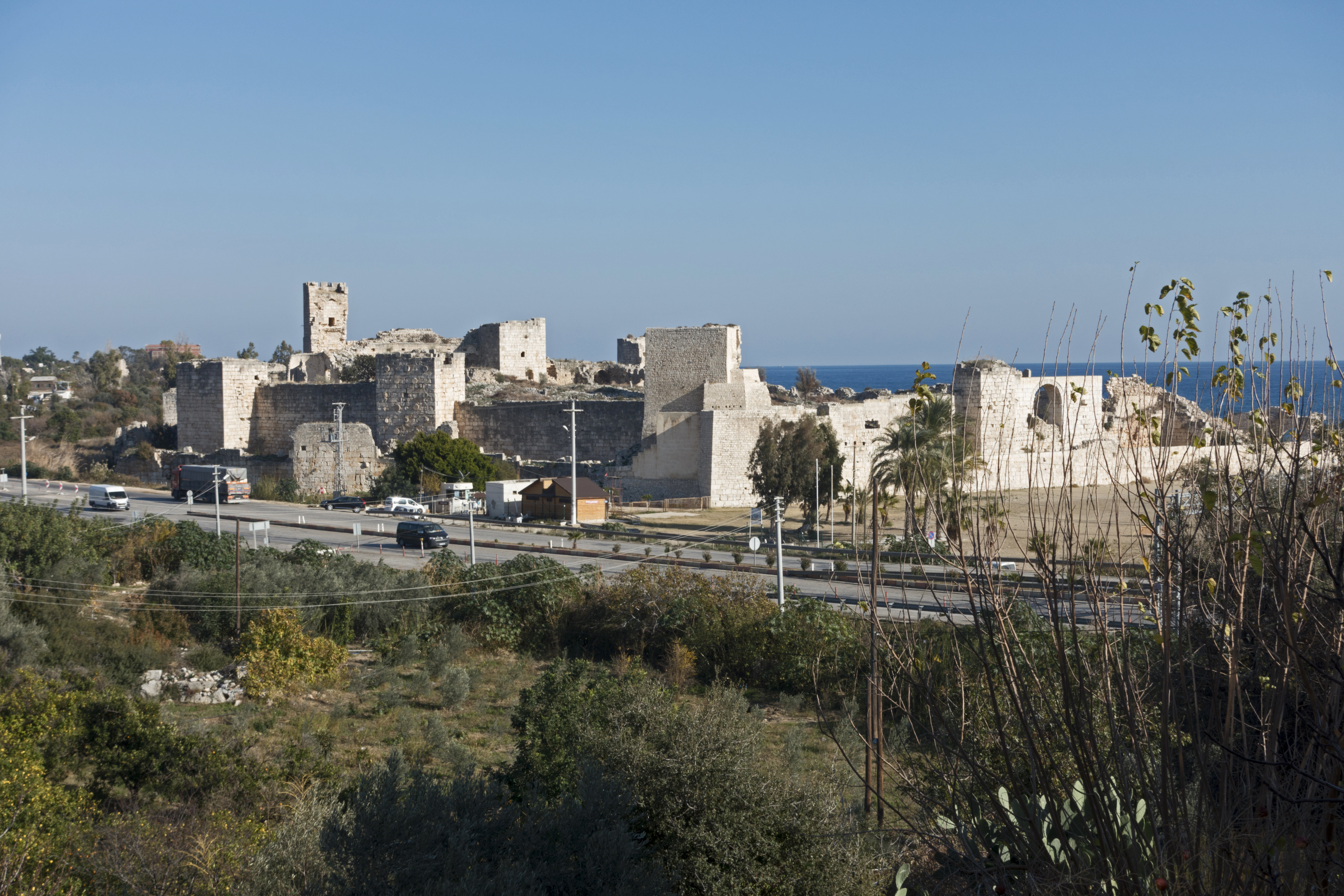
Land castle of Korykos View from necropolis across the road

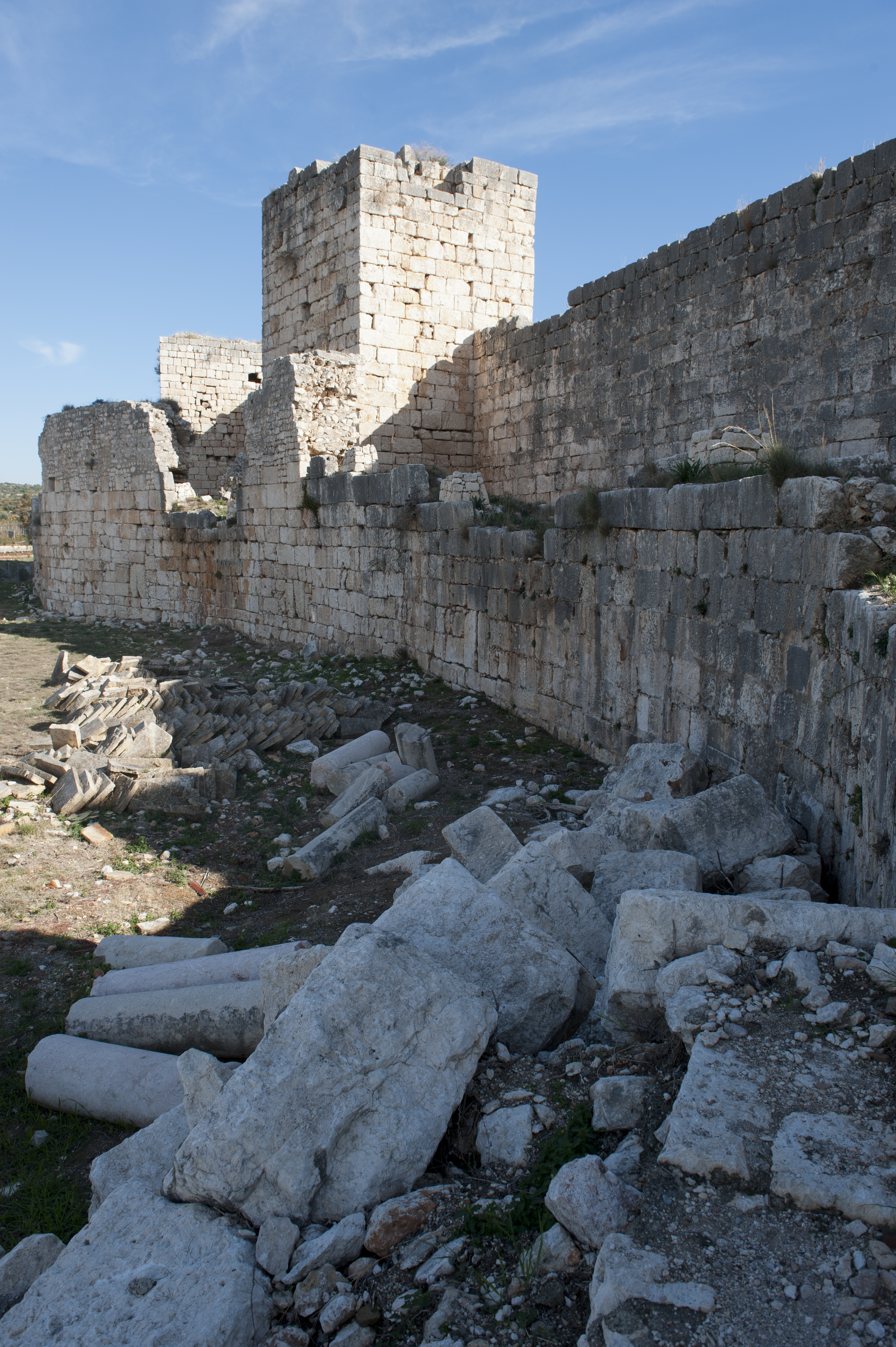
Land castle of Korykos Northwest front

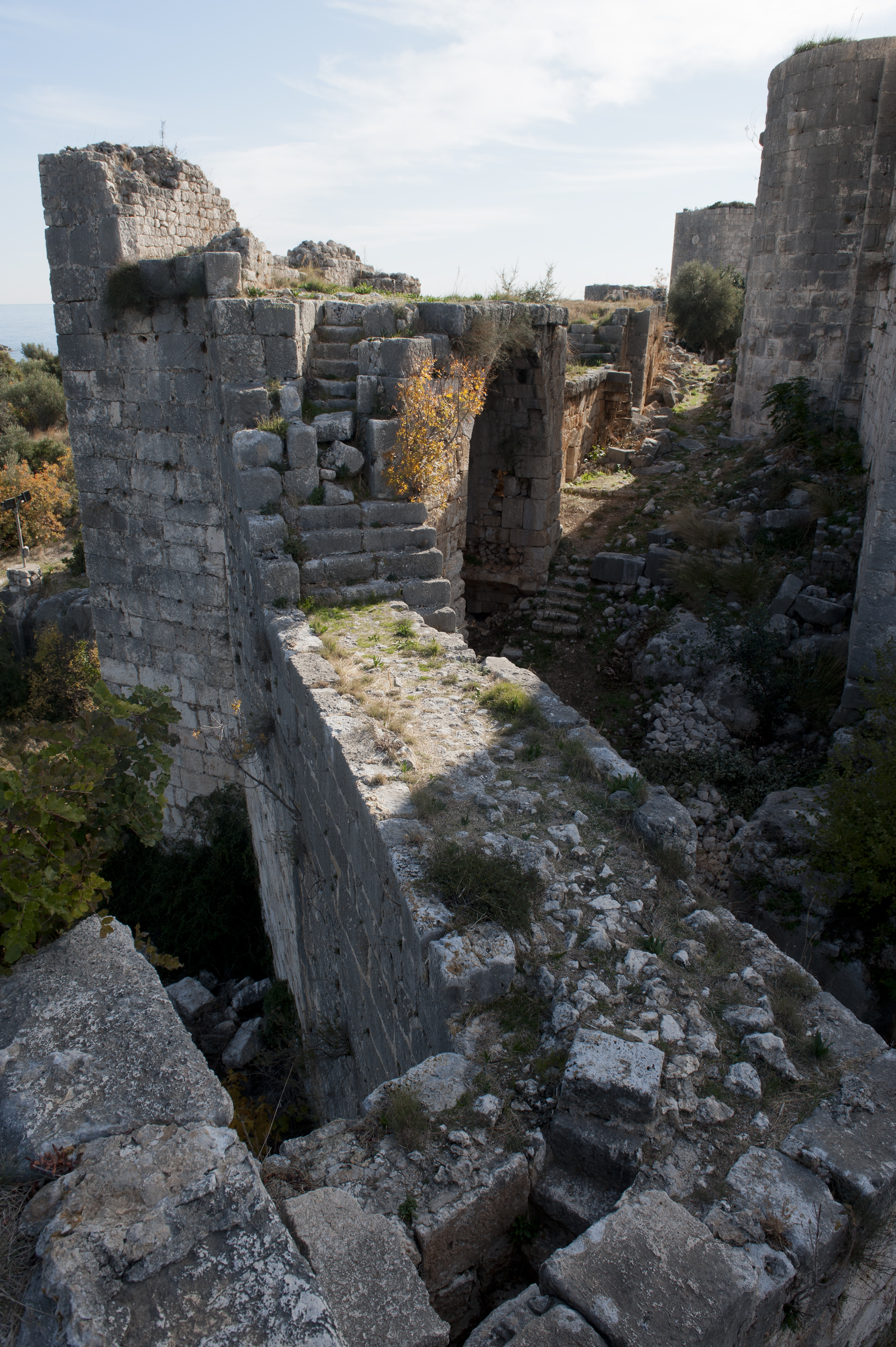
Land castle of Korykos Northeast side

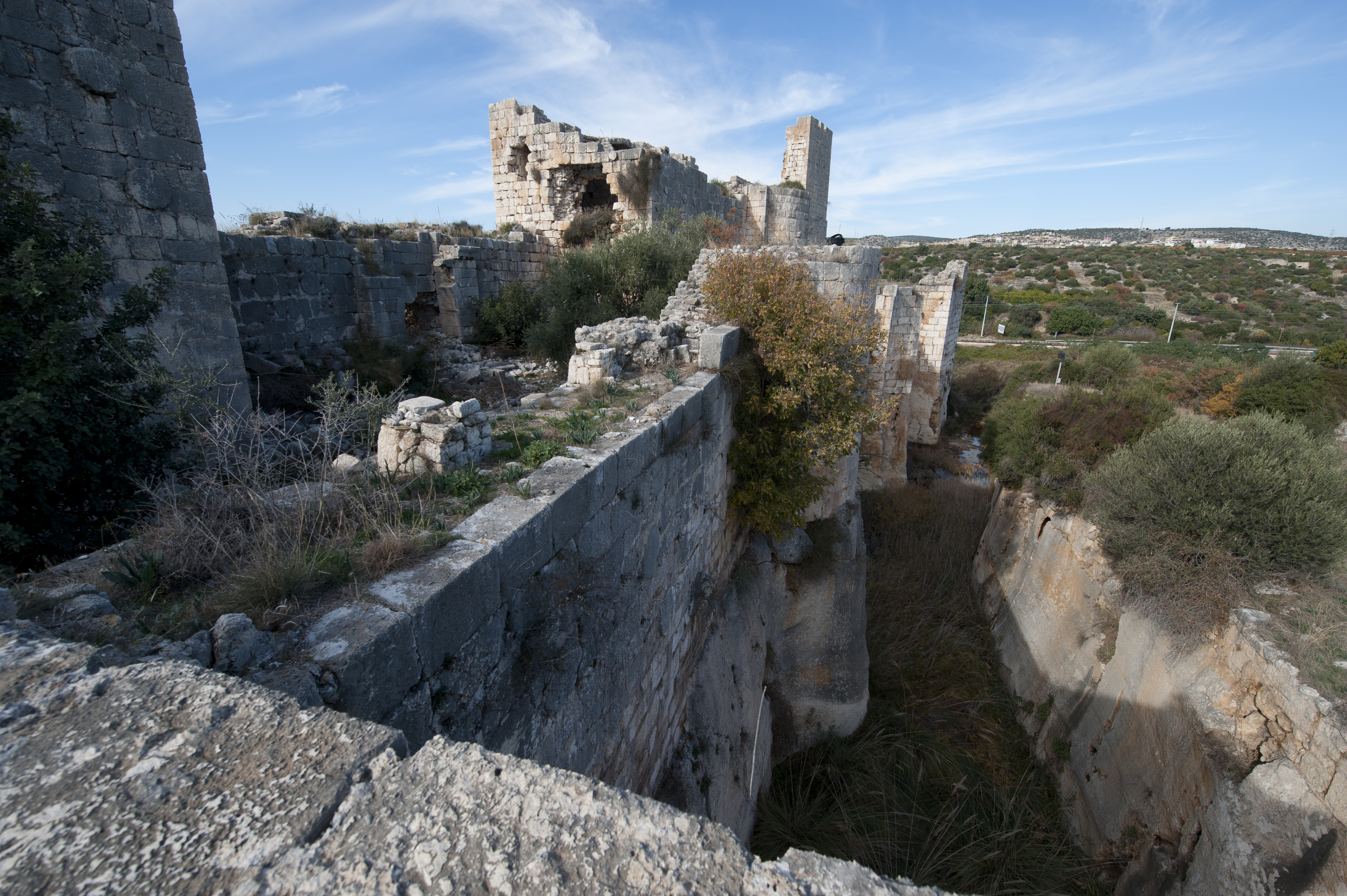
Land castle of Korykos Channel along Northeast side

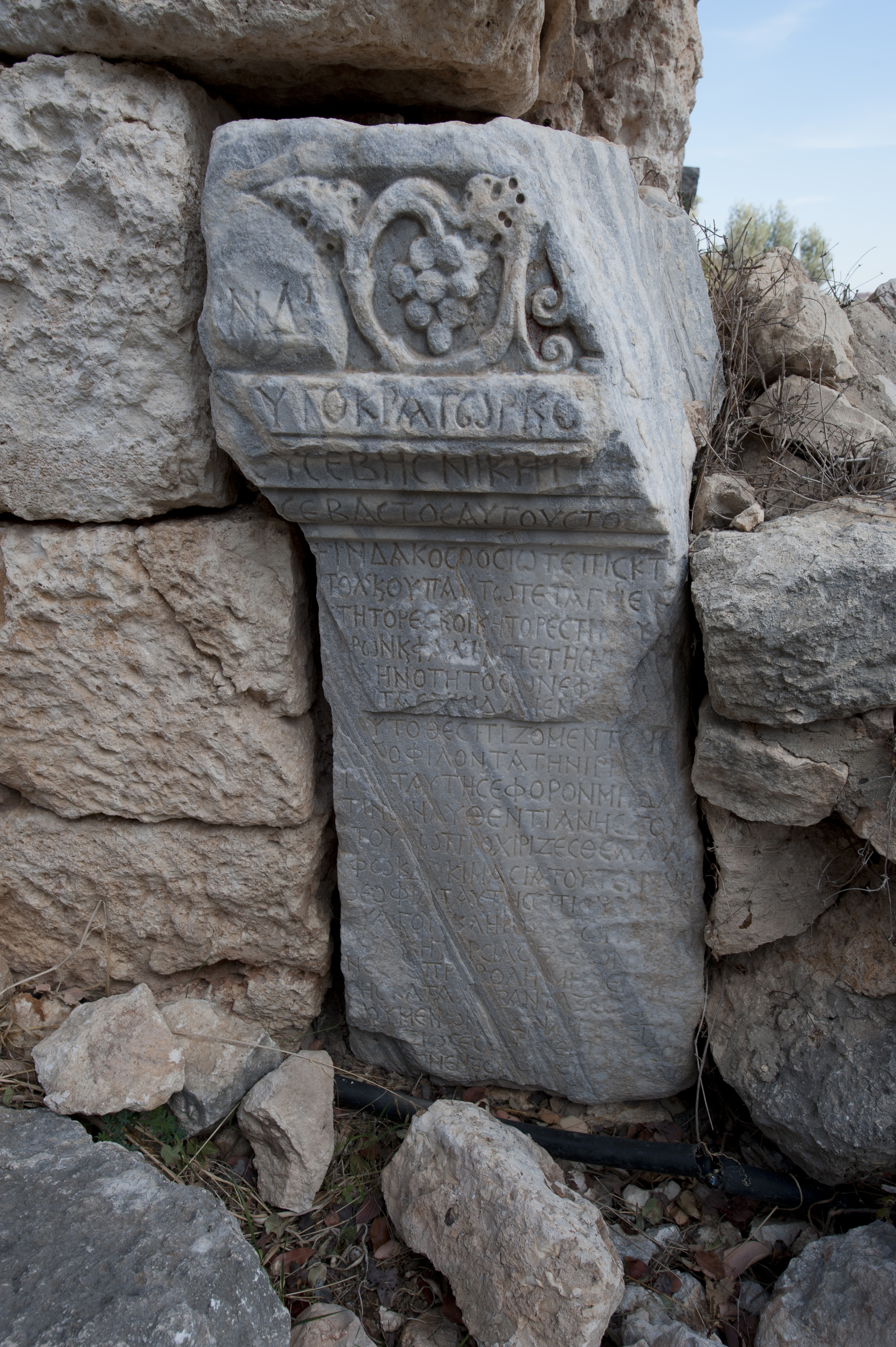
Land castle of Korykos Spolia

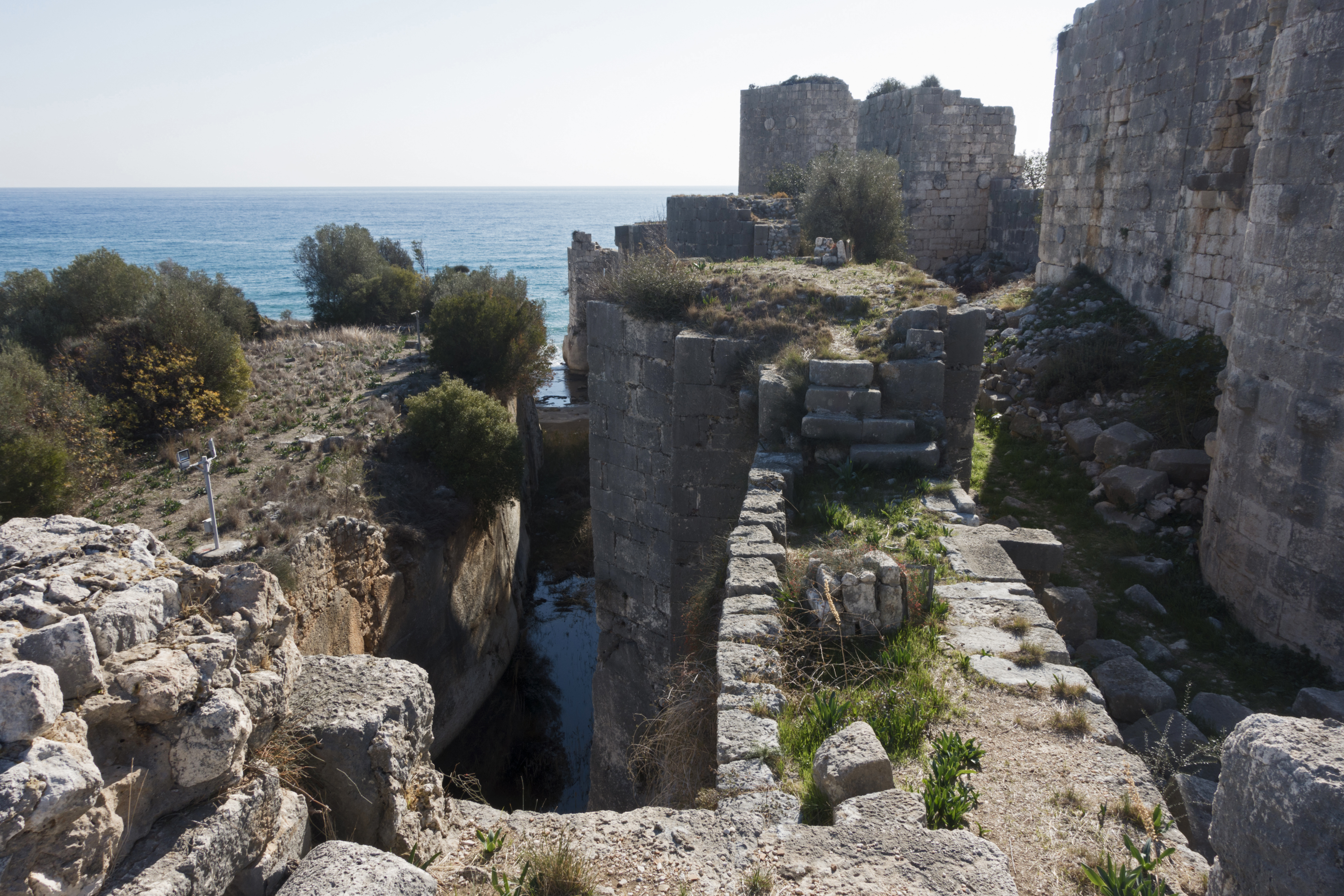
Land castle of Korykos View northeast with possible harbour entrance

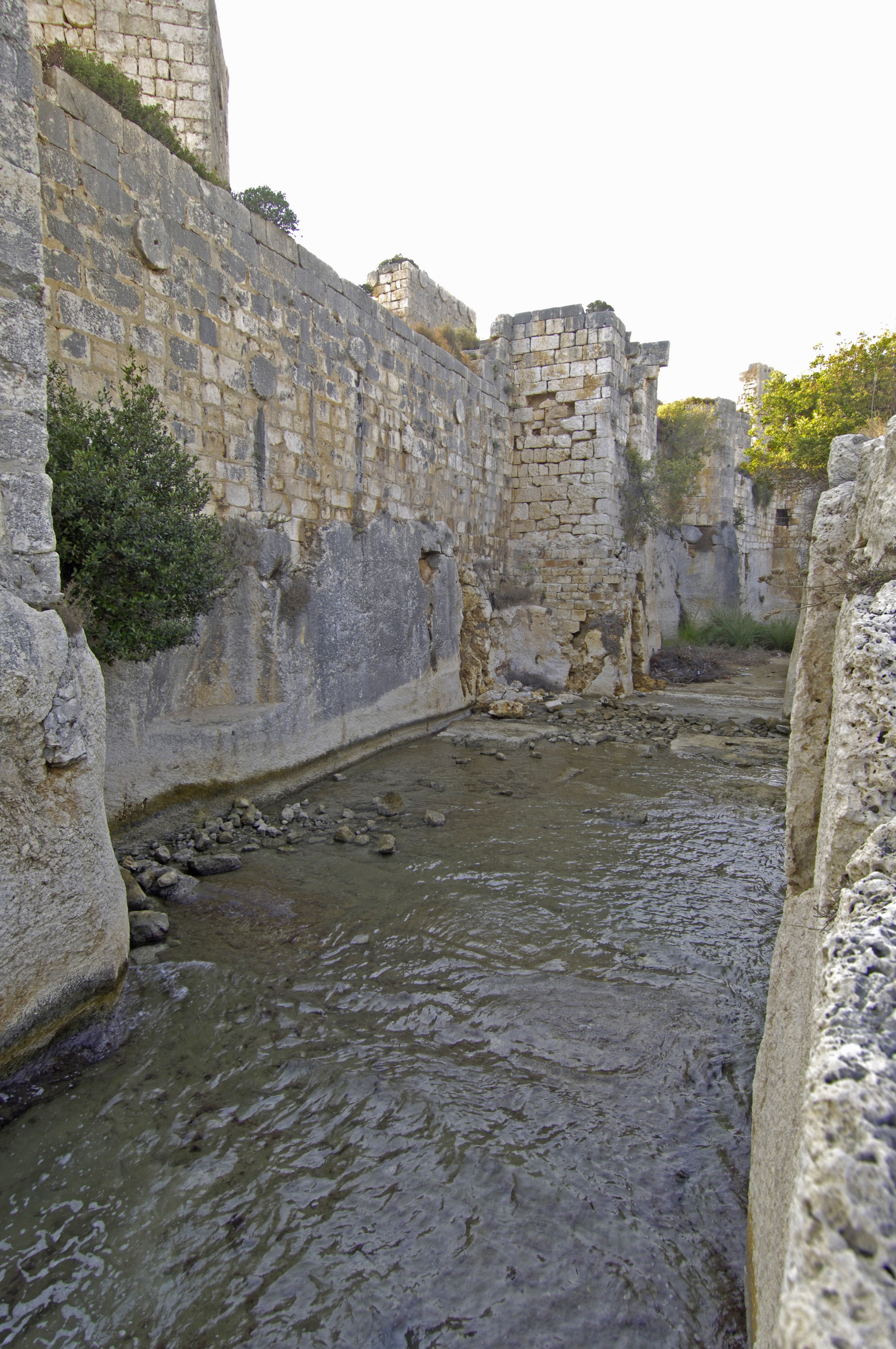
Land castle of Korykos Channel along Northeast side

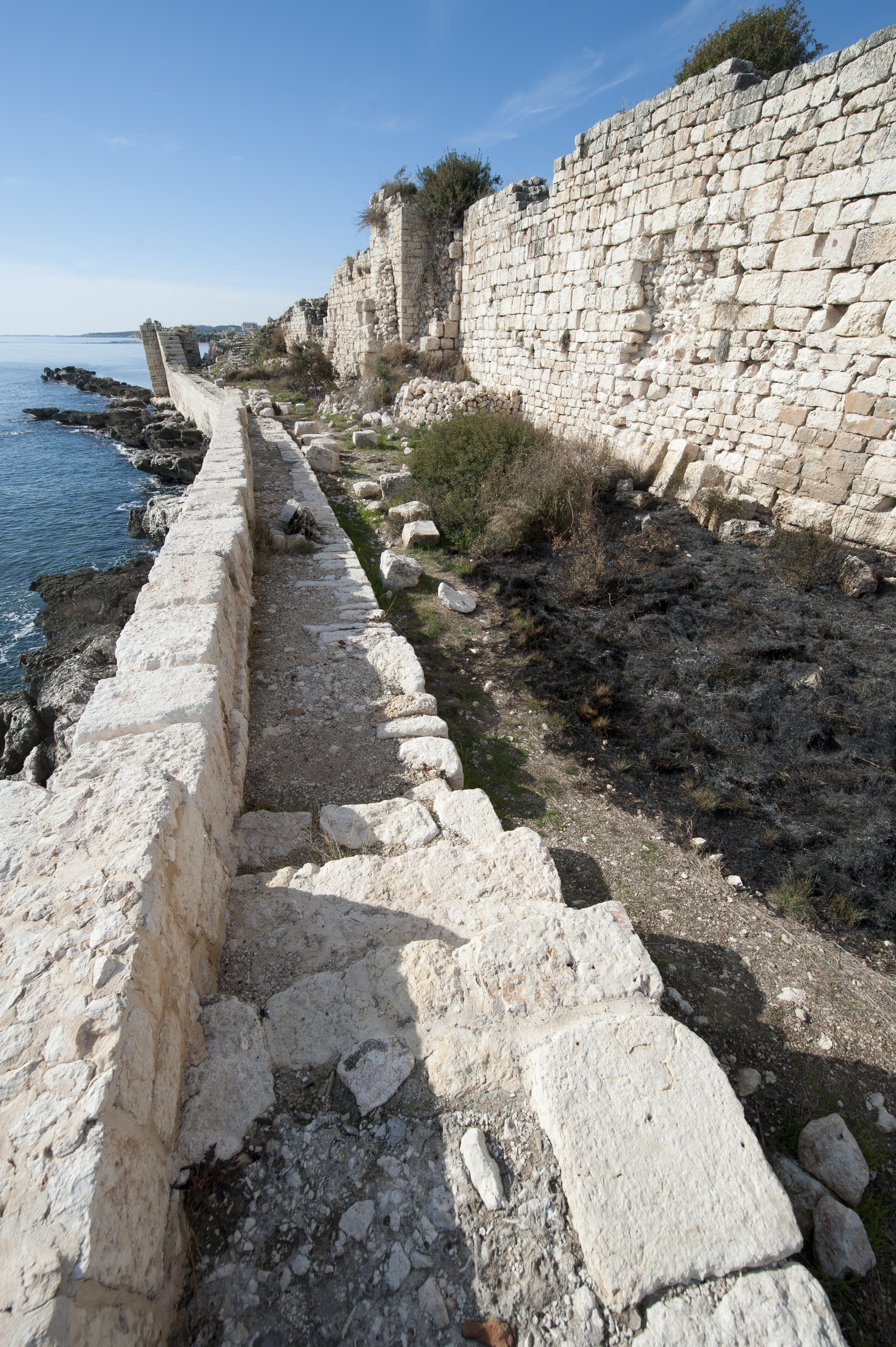
Land castle of Korykos Southeast side

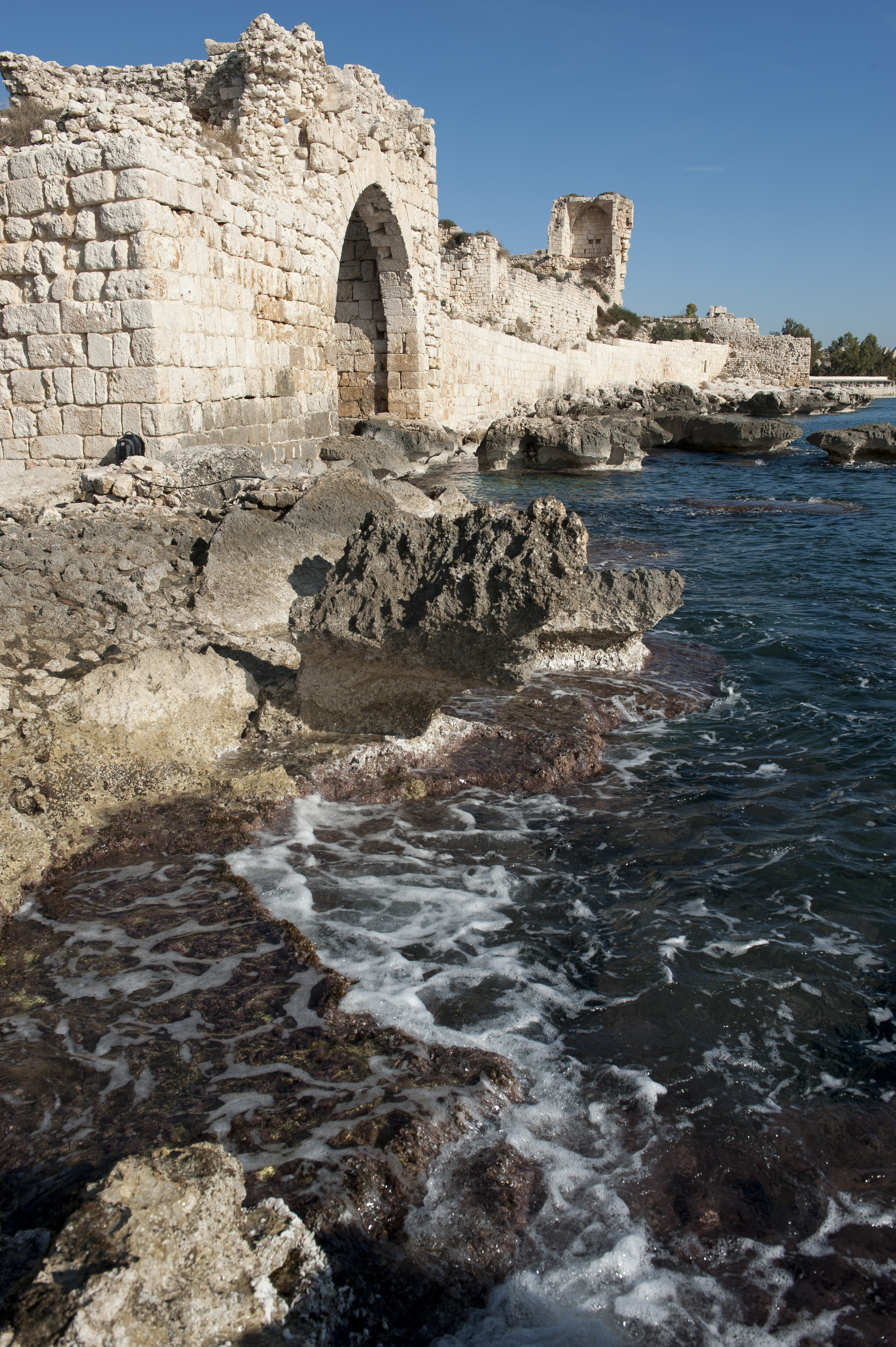
Land castle of Korykos Southeast front

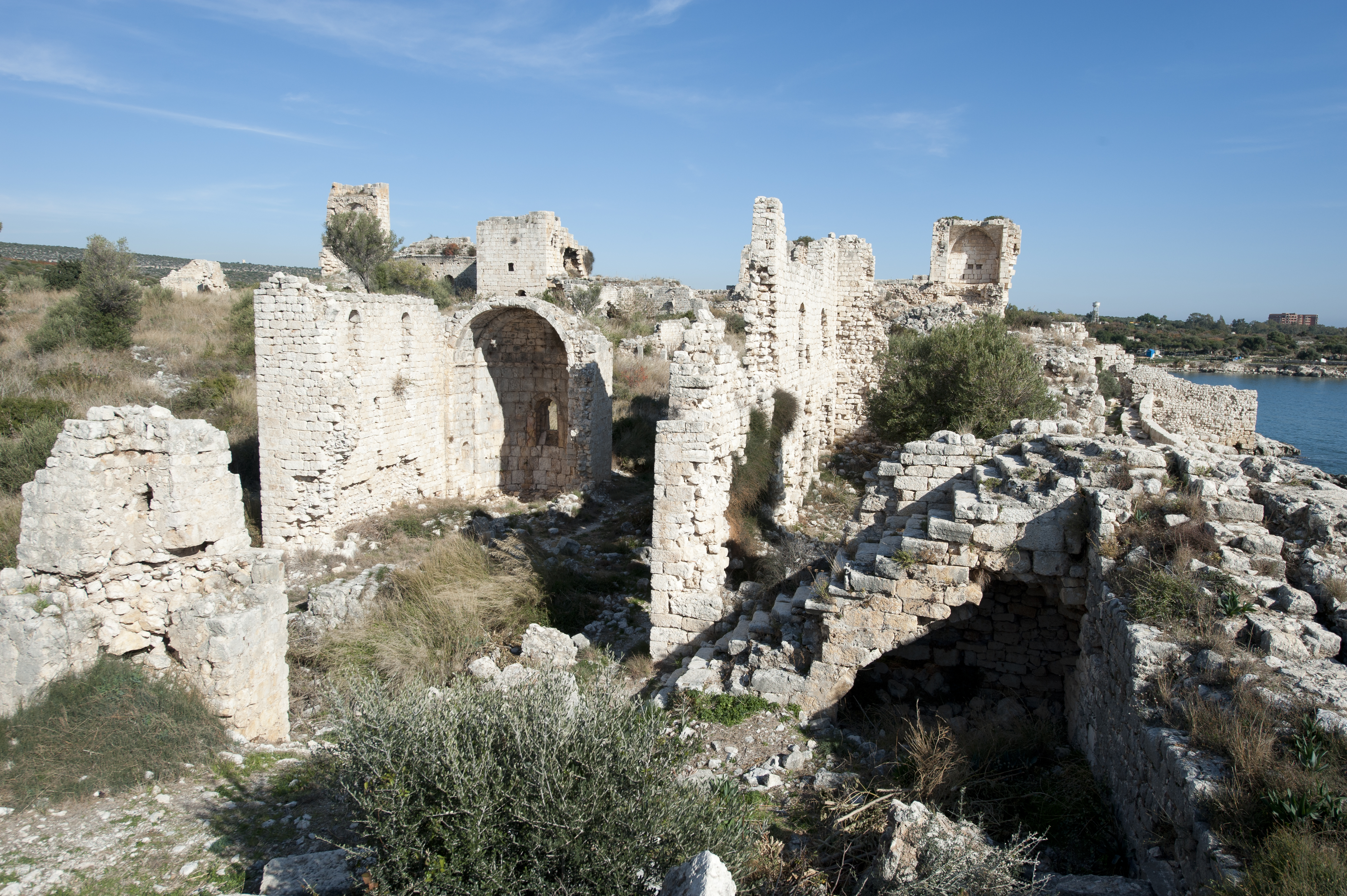
Land castle of Korykos Inside southeast walls

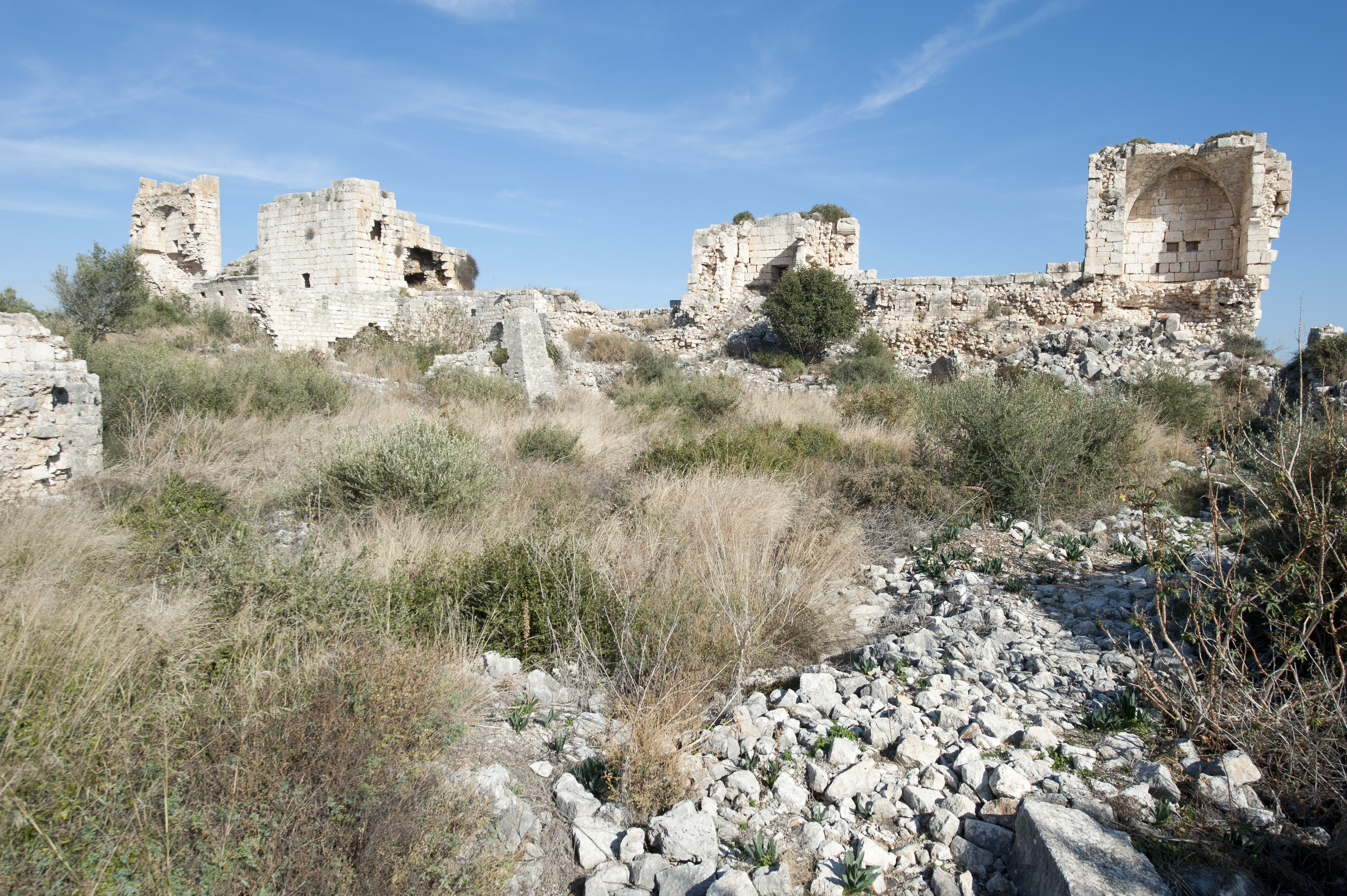
Land castle of Korykos Interior looking northeast

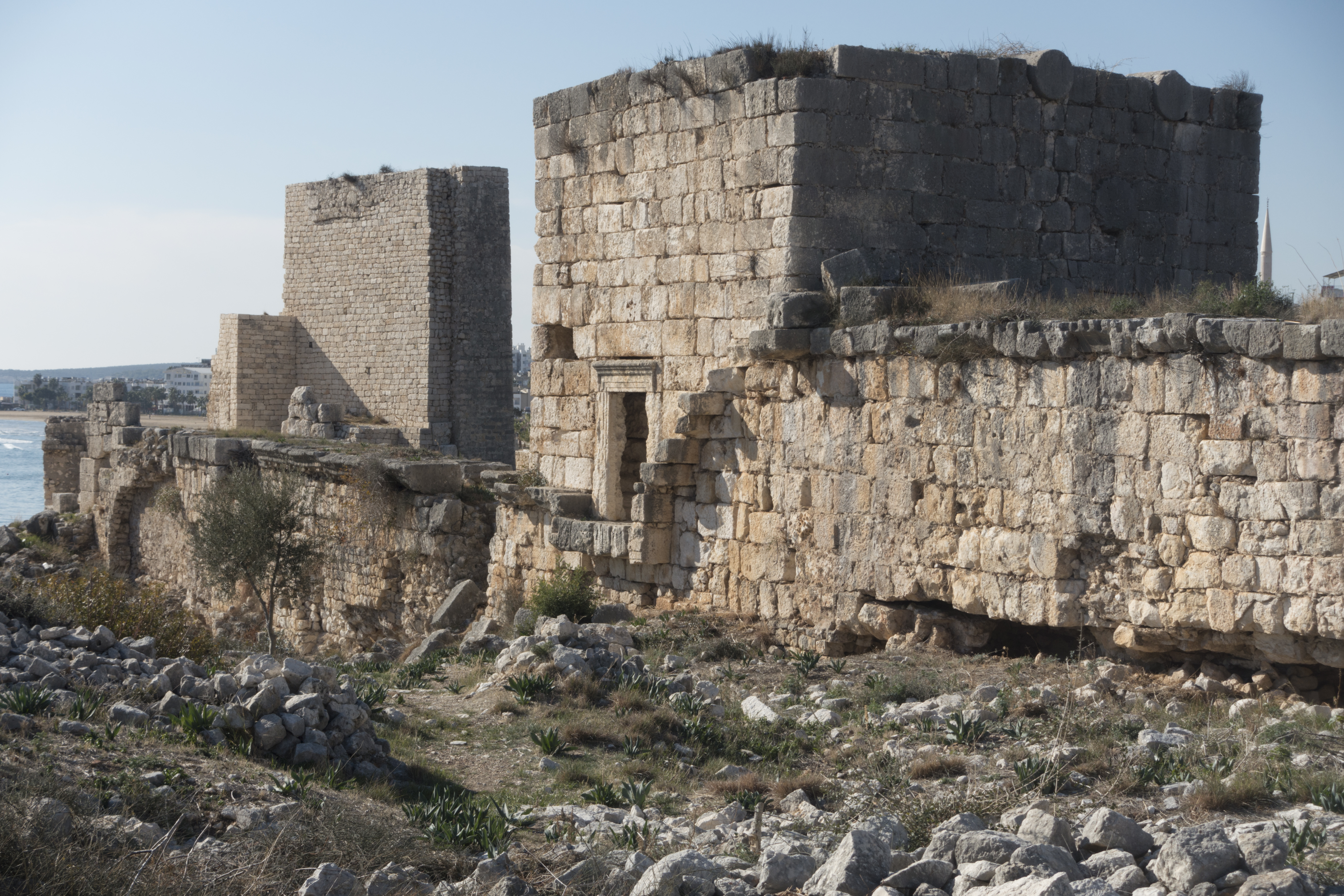
Land castle of Korykos Interior

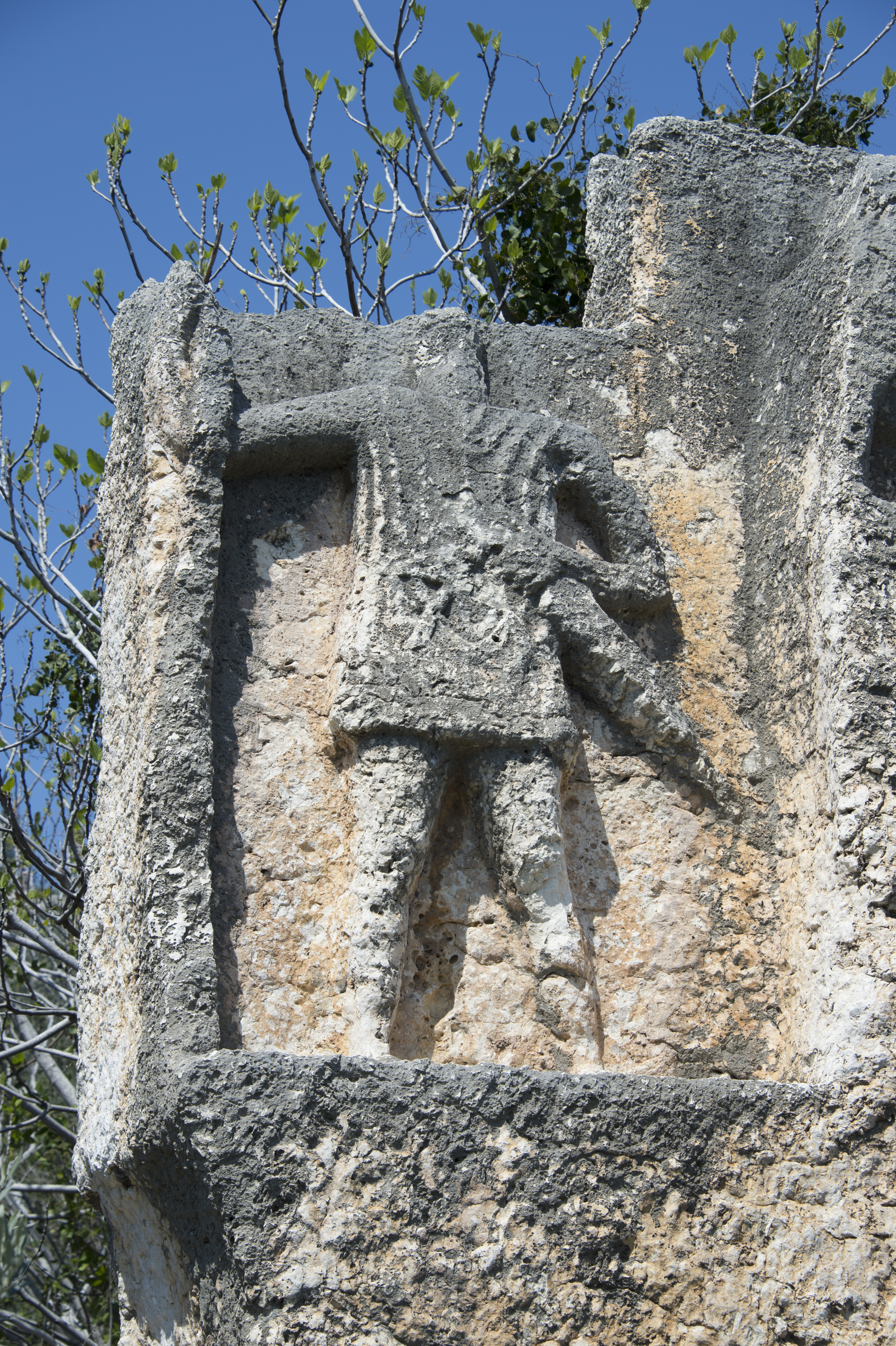
Korykon Soldier's grave

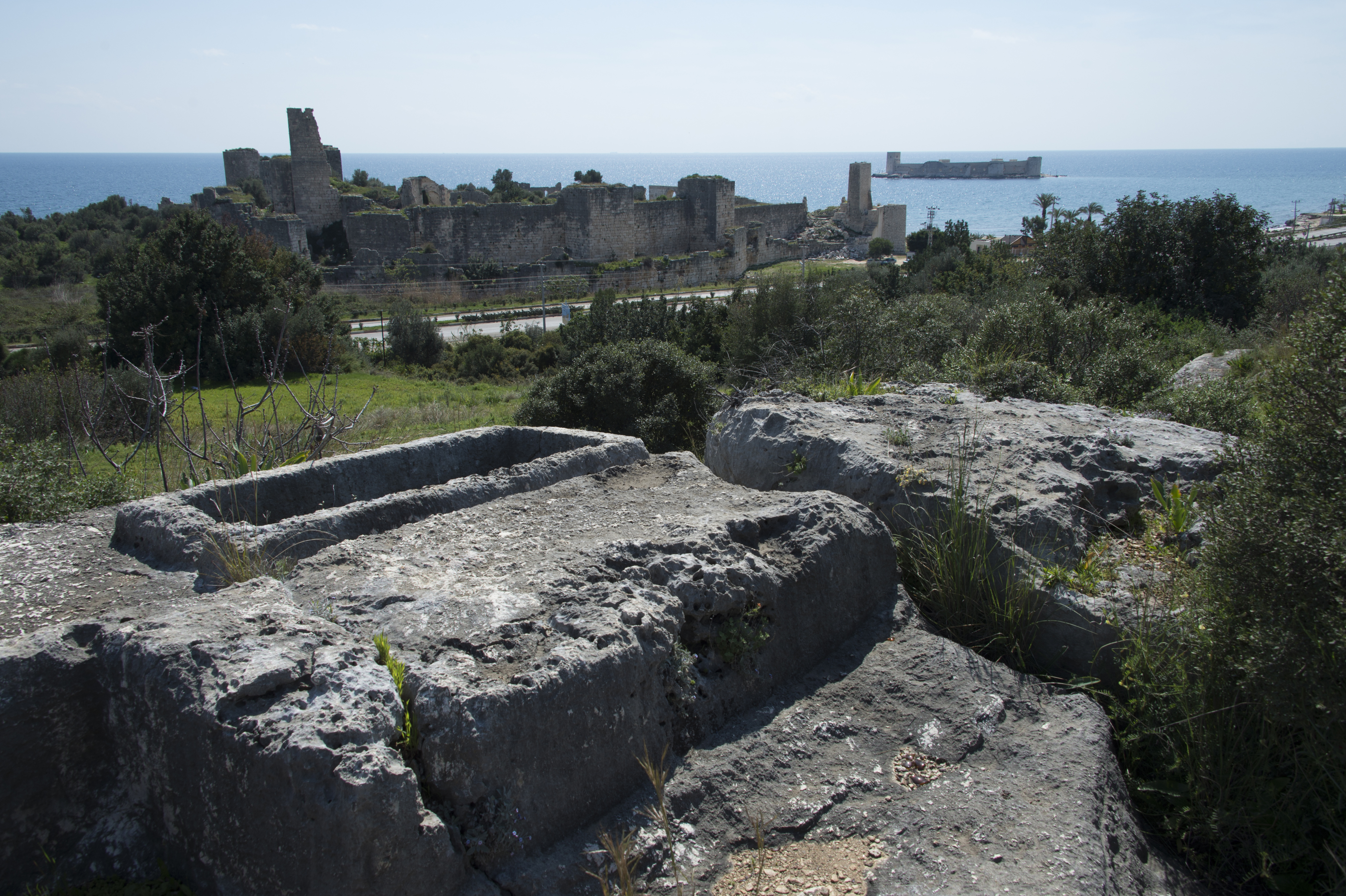
Korykon Necropolis and castles

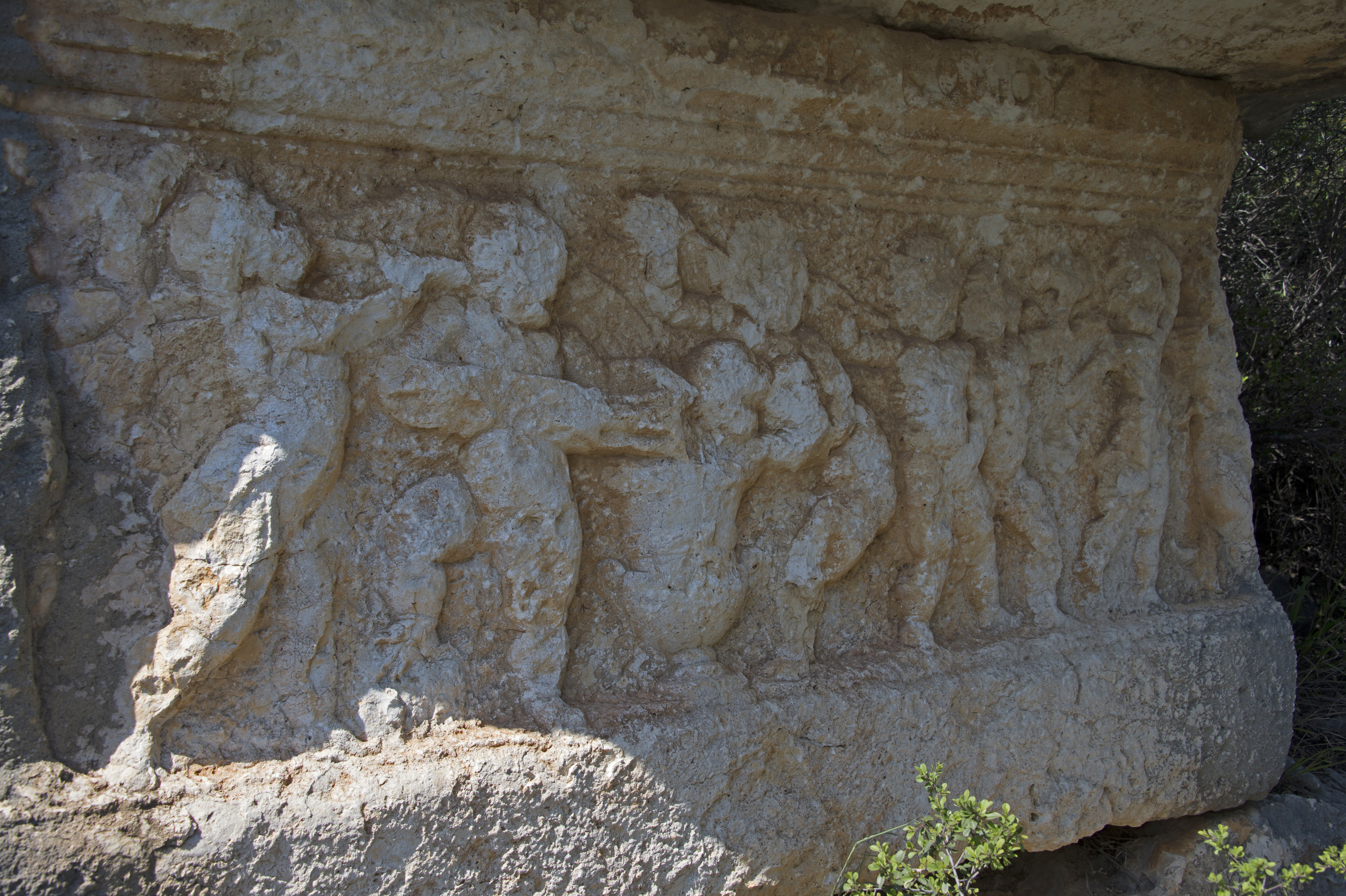
Korykon Sarcophagus

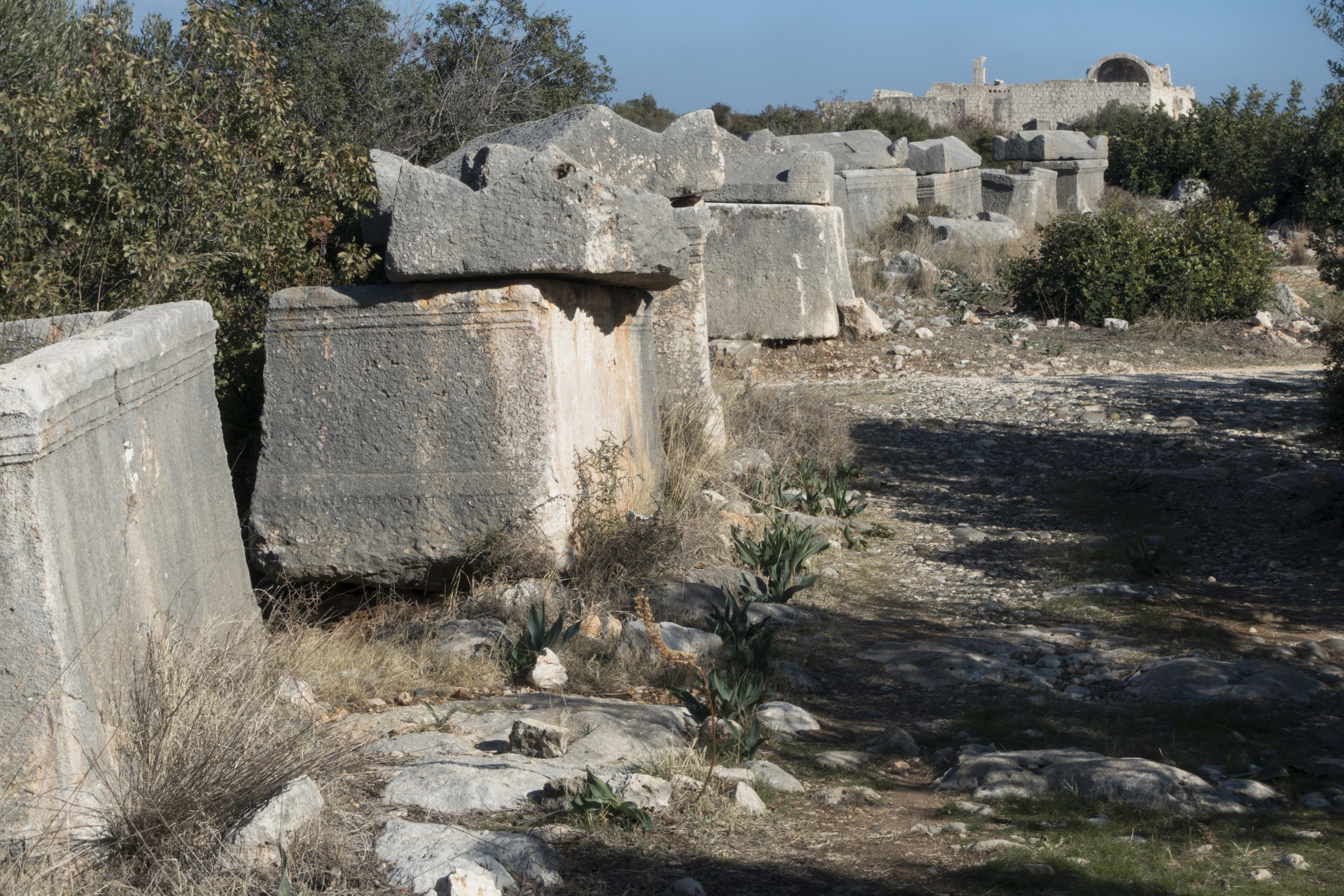
Korykon Sarcophagi and church

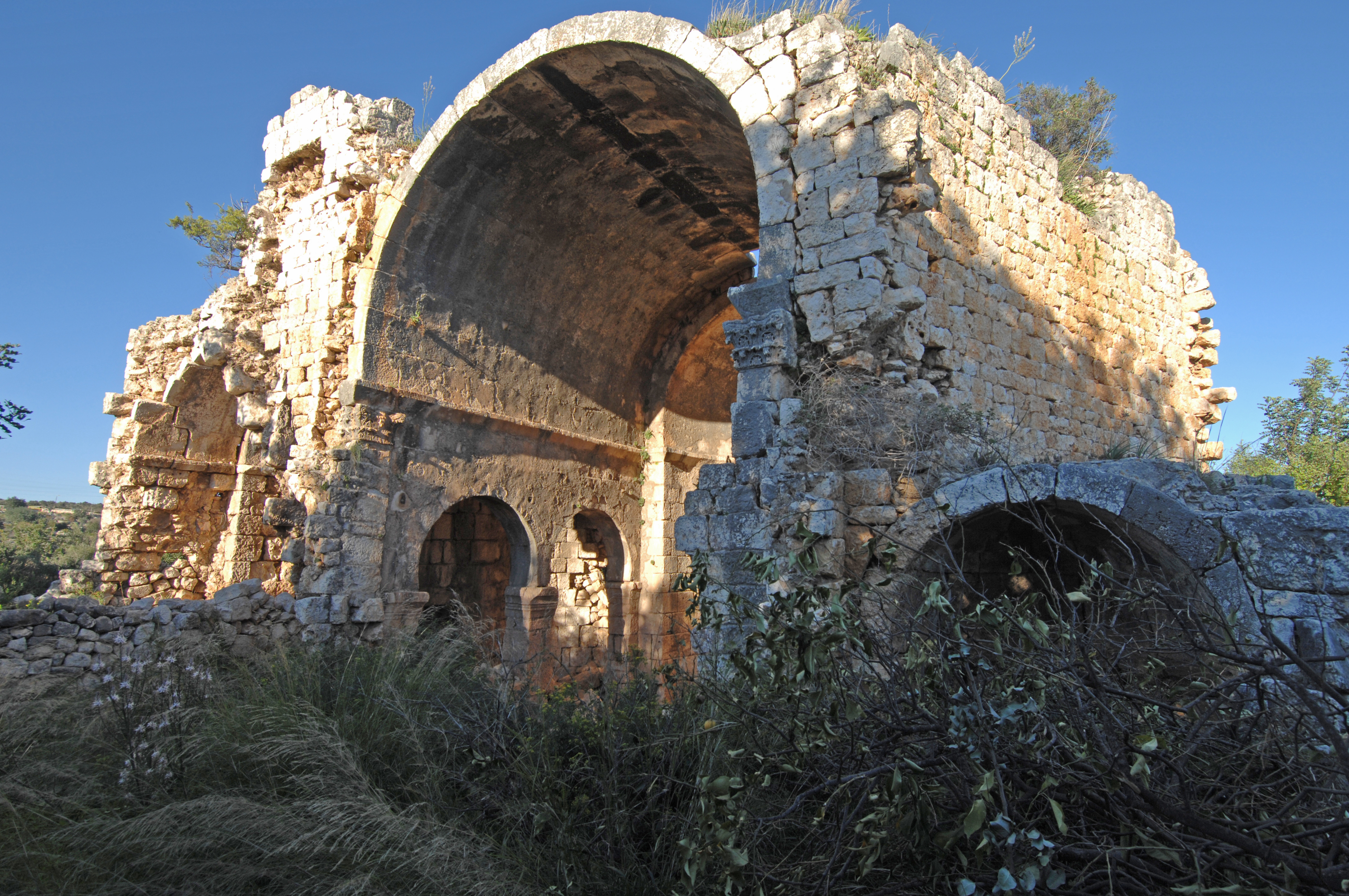
Korykon Church

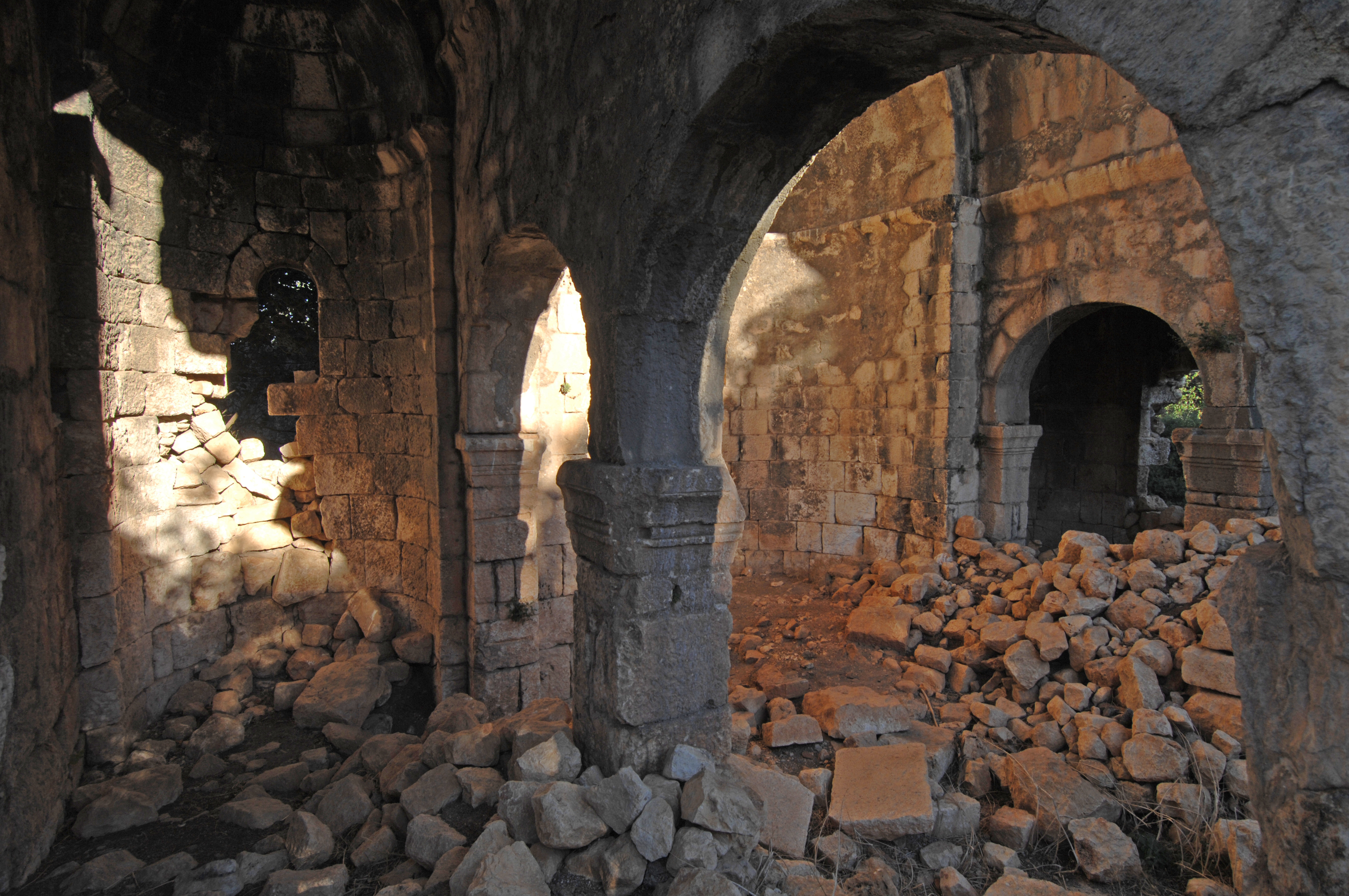
Korykon Church

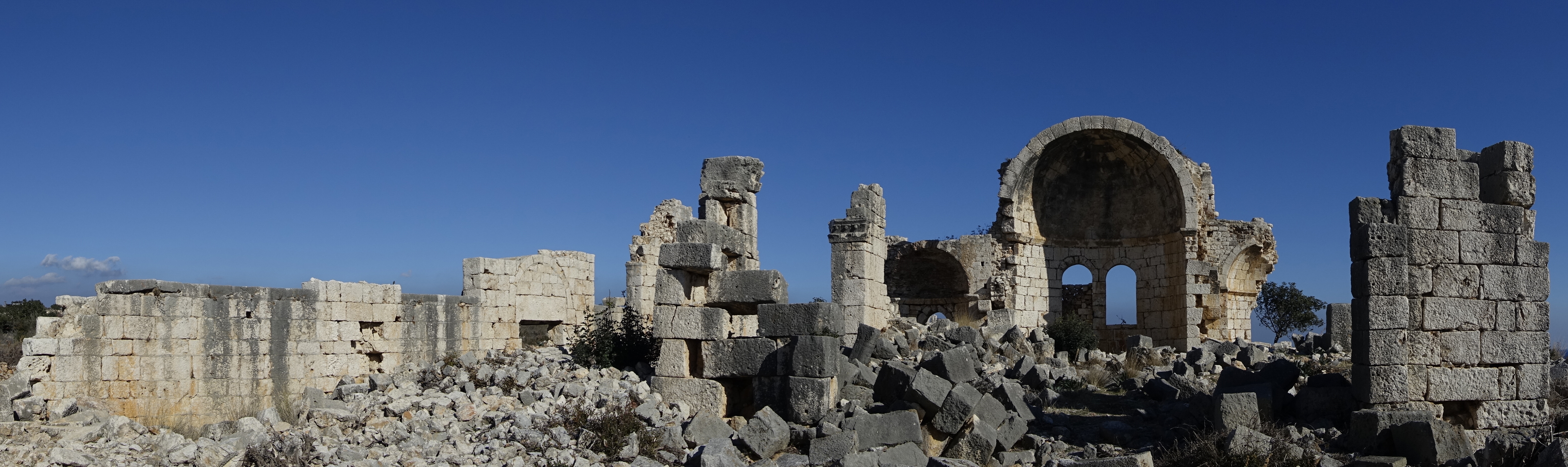
Korykon Church

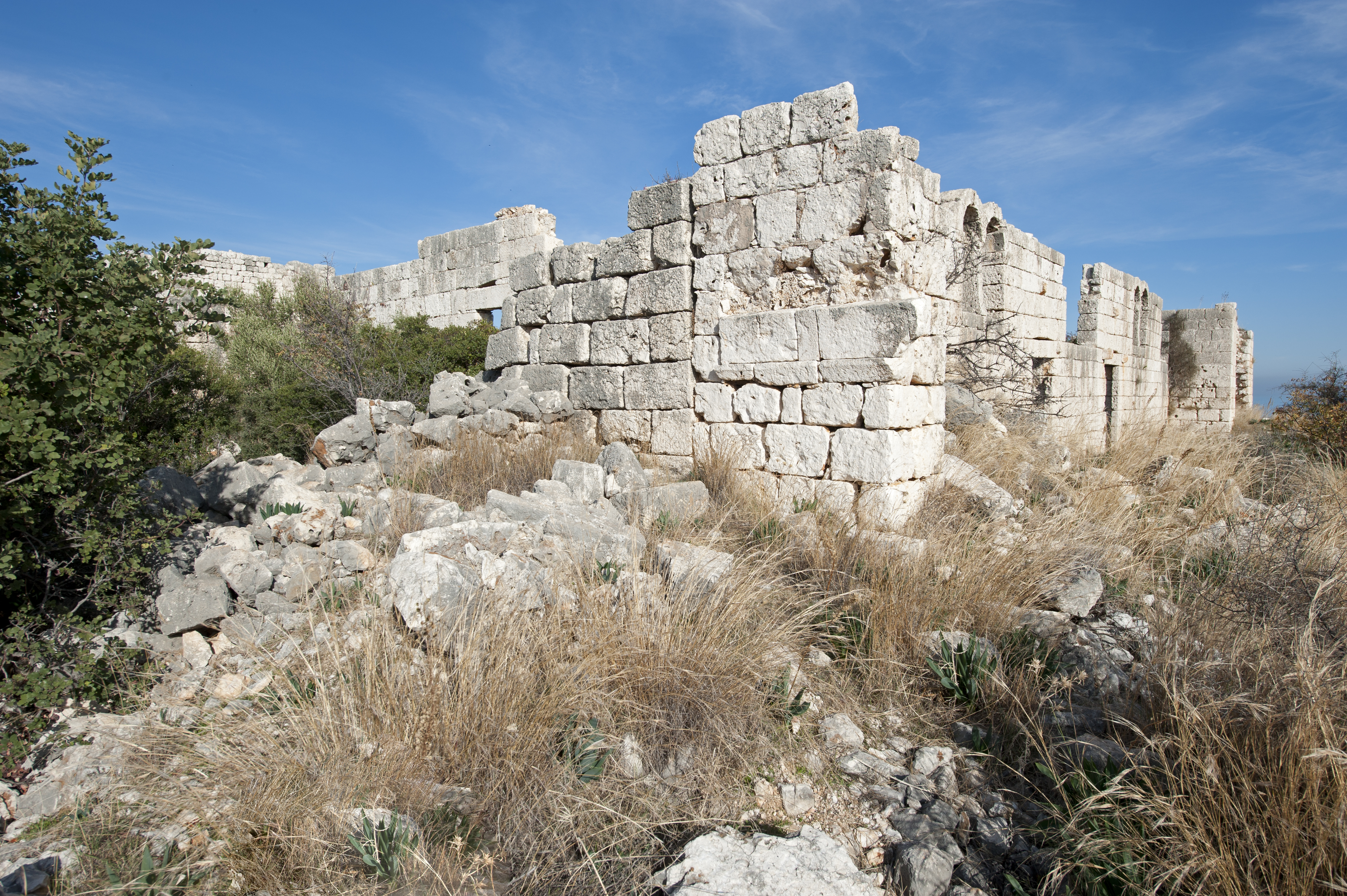
Korykon Church

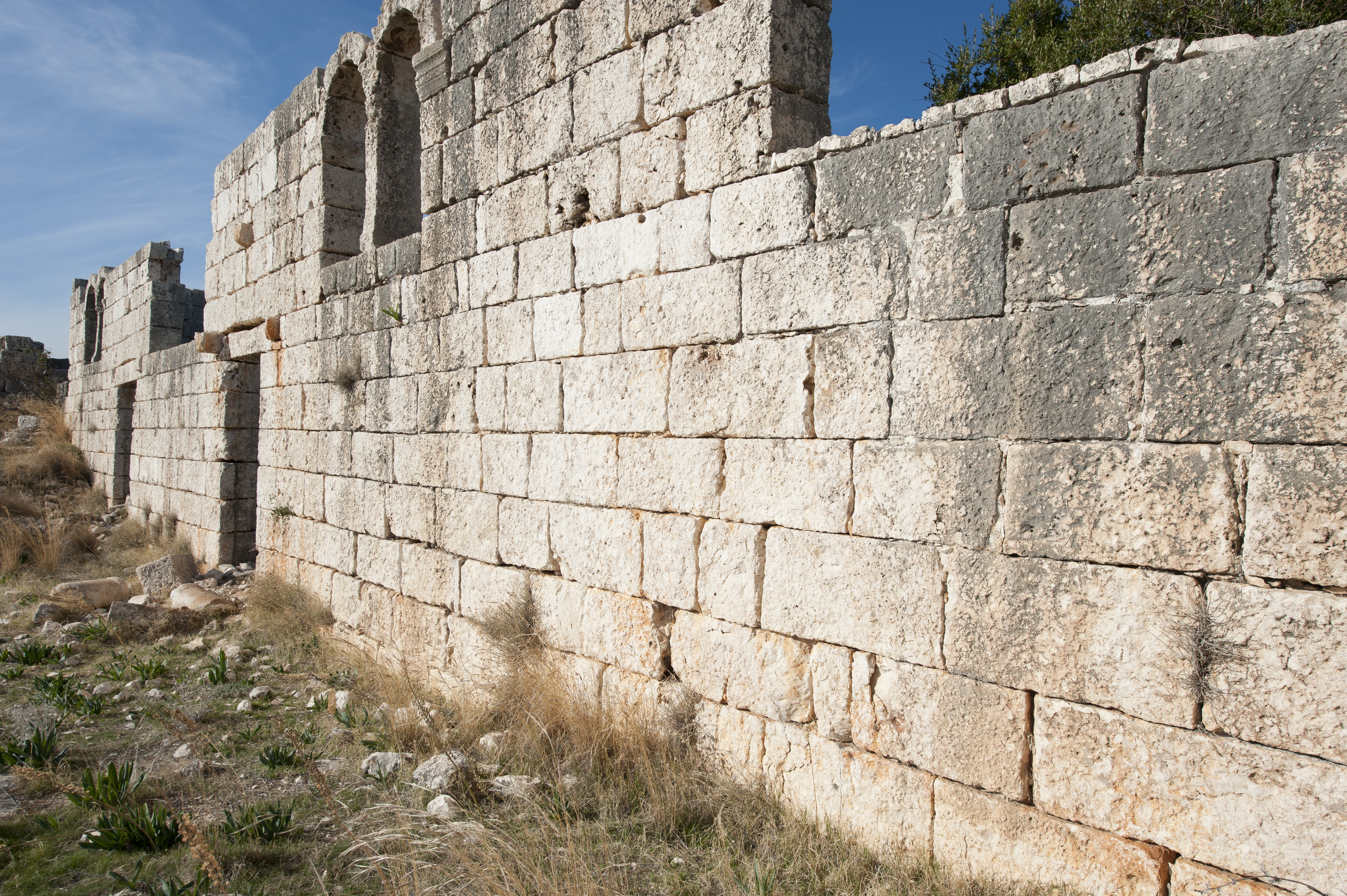
Korykon Church

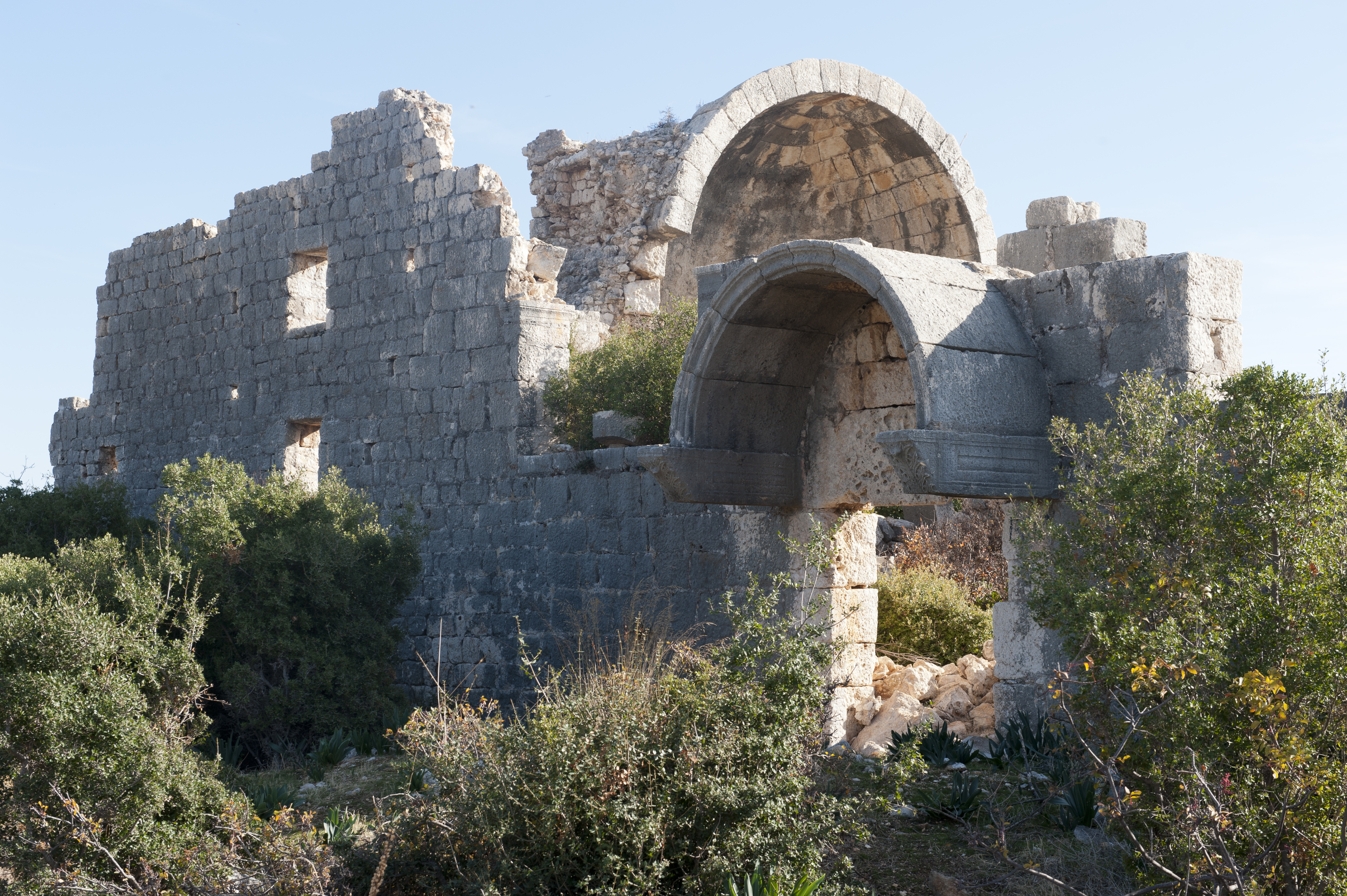
Korykon Church

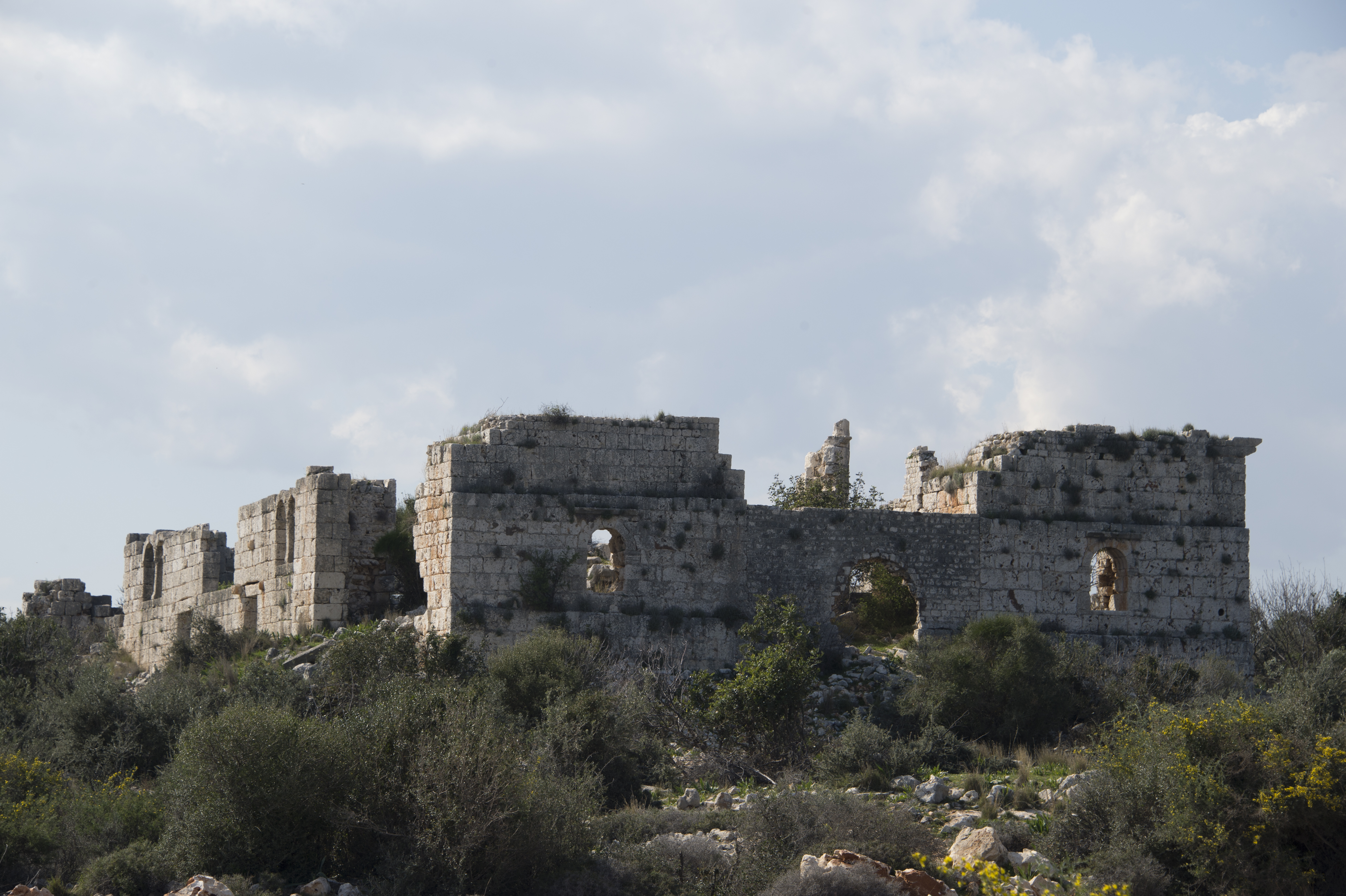
Korykon Church
