= Eustice =

Eustice may refer to:

- Ernest Eustice (1904–1958), South African boxer
- George Eustice (born 1971), British Conservative politician, elected MP for Camborne and Redruth in 2010
- Ken Eustice, a former Australian rules football player 1958–1970, also a club president and coach

== See also ==
- Eustace
