= Poutza =

Poutza (Ancient Greek: Ποῦτζα, genitive Πούτζης) was a Byzantine-era settlement near Adrianople in Thrace.

The settlement (qualified as πολίχνιον, "small town") first appears in the Alexiad as the place where the usurper Constantine Diogenes was captured in 1095. John of Poutza, who in c. 1146 served as finance minister of Manuel I Komnenos, probably hailed from this locality. Poutza is most likely to be identified with the district of pertinentia Pucis et Nicodimi, which was assigned to the Republic of Venice in the Partitio Romaniae of 1204, and may also be the chastel Peutaces that was still held by its Greek inhabitants and was attacked unsuccessfully by the Crusaders under Louis de Blois in 1205. Its exact location or present identification are unknown.

== Sources ==
- Soustal, Peter (1991). Tabula Imperii Byzantini, Band 6: Thrakien (Thrakē, Rodopē und Haimimontos) (in German). Vienna: Verlag der Österreichischen Akademie der Wissenschaften. ISBN 3-7001-1898-8.
