= Maurice Eustace (priest) =

Irish Roman Catholic priest and soldier

Maurice Eustace (executed November 1581) was an Irish soldier, secretly ordained a Roman Catholic priest, and hanged as a traitor.

== Life ==
He was the eldest son of Sir John Eustace of Castlemartin, County Kildare; they were an old Anglo-Irish family, a branch of the FitzEustace dynasty. Following the Desmond Rebellions, the family's loyalty to the Crown was suspect, as Viscount Baltinglass, the head of the family, was one of the principal rebels.

Maurice was sent to be educated at the Jesuit college at Bruges in Flanders. There, after the completion of his secular studies, he desired to enter the Society of Jesus. His father, however, wrote to the superiors of the college to send him home.

Maurice returned to Ireland. After a brief stay, during which he tried to dissuade his father from opposing his vocation, he went back to Flanders. His old masters, at the college of Bruges, advised him to return to Ireland and devote himself in the world to the service of religion.

Shortly after his arrival in Ireland, he got an appointment as captain of horse. He never abandoned the idea of becoming a priest, and secretly took holy orders. His servant, who was aware of the fact, told his father, who had his son immediately arrested and imprisoned in Dublin. A younger brother, desiring to inherit the family estates, also reported Maurice to be a priest, a Jesuit, and a friend of the Queen's enemies.

As a consequence, he was put on trial for high treason. During his imprisonment, Adam Loftus, Archbishop of Dublin, offered him his daughter in marriage and a large dowry if he would accept the reformed religion.

Eustace was sentenced to public execution and was hanged.
