= Eustis =

Eustis may refer to:

== People ==
- Abraham Eustis, American Army officer and lawyer
- Charles Eustis Bohlen (1904–1974), American ambassador
- Collin Eustis, American Cyber Security Expert
- Dorothy Harrison Eustis, dog breeder and philanthropist
- George Eustis Jr. (1828–1872), United States Representative from Louisiana
- Henry L. Eustis (1819–1885), Union army general
- James Biddle Eustis, United States Senator from Louisiana
- Oskar Eustis (1958-), United States theatre director
- William Eustis, (1753–1825), early American statesman
- William Corcoran Eustis (1862–1921), American Army captain
- William Henry Eustis (1845–1928), American mayor of Minneapolis

== Places ==
In the United States:

- Eustis, Florida
- Eustis, Maine
- Eustis, Nebraska
- Fort Eustis, United States military base located in Newport News, Virginia
- Lake Eustis, lake in Central Florida near the towns of Eustis and Tavares

== See also ==
- Eustace (disambiguation)
