= Ostap =

Ostap (Ukrainian: Остап) is a Ukrainian male given name. It derives from the Greek name Eustathius.

People with this name include:

- Ostap Bender, a fictional character from the Russian novel The Twelve Chairs
- Ostap Dashkevych (ca. 1495–1535), commander of the Ukrainian Cossacks
- Ostap Ortwin (1876–1942), Polish journalist
- Ostap Steckiw (1924–2001), Polish-born Canadian soccer player
- Ostap Veresai (1803–1890), Ukrainian minstrel
- Ostap Vyshnya (1889–1956), Ukrainian writer, satirist, and medical official
