= Stuart Eustace =

English cricketer (born 1979)

Stuart Malcolm Eustace (born 3 May 1979 in Birmingham) is an English cricketer. He is a left-handed batsman and a wicketkeeper who started playing Twenty20 cricket in 2005 for Warwickshire. He has also played Minor Counties cricket for Devon and has played in one first-class match for Warwickshire.
