= Eustache Marcadé =

Eustache Marcadé was born in Artois at an unknown date and died in 1440. He was responsible for one of the first mysteries. He was provost of Dampierre, official of the Abbey of Corbie from 1414 and dean of the "Faculté de Décret", the forerunner of the Faculty of laws. He was removed from office in 1427 and reinstated by a court in 1437.

== Passion of Arras ==
He is credited with "Le Mystère de la Passion", commonly known as the "Passion of Arras", which was performed at Arras by 1420-1430 and at Metz in 1437. This mystery has 24,944 octosyllables and takes place on four days. The prologue describes the "trial" of Paradise "where God hears the testimony of Justice and Mercy on the evils [of] Satan in the world." God decides to send his son to redeem mankind. The first three days are devoted to the life of Jesus on earth, from birth to the Passion. On the fourth day, he goes to heaven to report on his work of redemption. The manuscript of the Passion of Arras contains another mystery play, Mystère de la Vengeance de Nostre Seigneur Ihesu Crist (Mystery of The Vengeance of Our Lord Jesus Christ), also attributed to Eustache Marcadé. It is loosely based on the Vindicta Salvatoris.

Found by following the theme of the "trial of Paradise" in other mysteries such as The Mystery of the Passion of Arnulf Gréban.
