= Constantine Diogenes (pretender) =

Byzantine pretender

Pseudo-Constantine Diogenes or Pseudo-Leo Diogenes (died after 1095) was an unsuccessful pretender to the Byzantine throne against Emperor Alexios I Komnenos. Of lowly origin, he pretended to be a son of Emperor Romanos IV Diogenes. Exiled to Cherson, he escaped and took refuge among the Cumans. In 1095, he invaded the Byzantine Empire at the head of a Cuman host and advanced as far as Adrianople before being captured by a ruse and blinded by loyalist forces.

== Life ==
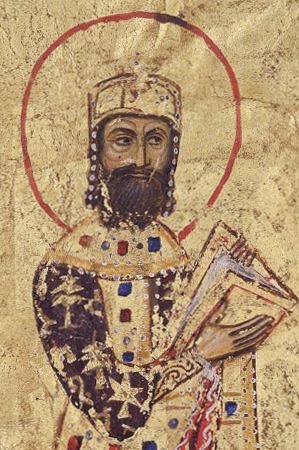
Portrait of Alexios I Komnenos (r. 1081-1118)

According to Anna Komnene's Alexiad, he was a man of obscure origin who pretended to be Leo Diogenes, son of emperor Romanos IV Diogenes (r. 1068–1071– ), and who had died near Antioch in 1073. Since the son of Romanos IV who died at Antioch was not Leo but rather Constantine Diogenes, the emperor's eldest son, scholars have traditionally emended Anna's reference accordingly. On the other hand, given the support provided by the Cumans to this pretender, the French scholar Jean-Claude Cheynet suggests that he did indeed claim to be Leo, who unlike his brother had been active on the Empire's Danube frontier and was known to the Cumans, dying in battle against them in 1087.

According to Anna's account, Pseudo-Diogenes came to Constantinople from the East, "poor and wearing a goat's skin". Nevertheless, he soon gathered a group of supporters among the populace, and openly claimed his intention to claim the throne from Alexios I Komnenos (r. 1081–1118). Alexios at first disregarded the pretender's agitations, but then his sister Theodora, the widow of the real Constantine Diogenes, who had retired to a monastery, protested the abuse of her husband's name, and the emperor had the pretender arrested and exiled to Cherson.

There, the pretender made contact with the Cumans who frequented the town. One night, he climbed over the walls and, escorted by Cumans, escaped his imprisonment. Seeking refuge among the Cumans, he soon gained their recognition as emperor and their support in his attempt to claim the throne, although, as Anna Komnene reports, this was more a pretext for raiding and plundering the Byzantine provinces. With Pseudo-Diogenes at their head, the Cumans crossed the Danube and invaded imperial territory in 1095. The Cumans swiftly occupied the province of Paristrion near the river, and Alexios moved out with his army to confront them, making Anchialos his base of operations. The emperor placed detachments to guard the passes over the Balkan Mountains, but using local Vlach guides the Cumans were able to bypass the Byzantine forces and descend onto the plains of Thrace.

The Diogenes name retained its attraction among members of the imperial army and the populace, as evidenced in the foiled plot in the previous year under Romanos IV's third and youngest son, Nikephoros Diogenes, or the use of another Diogenes pretender as a puppet during the Norman invasion of Bohemond I of Antioch a decade later. Thus the pretender's cause received a boost when the citizens of Goloe opened their gates and acclaimed him emperor, followed soon after by Diabolis and other towns. Encouraged, the Cumans moved against Alexios at Anchialos, but after three days of the two armies' massing against each other for battle, the Cumans departed, as the terrain did not favour their style of warfare, nor could the Byzantines be induced to attack them.

Route of the Cumans' invasion of 1095

The pretender now persuaded the Cumans to push further south on Adrianople, whose governor, Nikephoros Bryennios the Elder, was a relative of Romanos IV and of whom he expected that he would open the gates of the city to him. However, when the pretender and the Cumans appeared before the walls of Adrianople, and the pretender called upon his "uncle" to surrender, the blind Bryennios said that he did not recognize his voice. The Cumans then laid siege to the city. The garrison and the citizens resisted with valour, launching sallies against the besiegers, and after 48 days launched a general sortie which drove back the Cumans. During this sortie, Pseudo-Diogenes received a whip cut to the face by a young Byzantine warrior, Marianos Mavrokatakalon.

At this point, one of Alexios' commanders, Alakaseus, decided upon a ruse: he shaved and disfigured himself, and went to meet the pretender, claiming to have been mistreated by Alexios. Calling upon his old friendship Romanos IV and his sufferings to prove his loyalty, he induced the pretender to enter the fortress of Poutza, which he proposed to surrender to him. The pretender and his Cuman escorts were feted and dined at the governor's palace. After they fell asleep, however, the Byzantines killed the Cumans and took the pretender captive. At Tzouroulos, he was delivered to the droungarios Eustathios Kymineianos, and blinded by a Turkish servant. Following the capture of the pretender, Alexios defeated the Cumans and drove them back across the Danube.

The historian Basile Skoulatos remarks that the episode of Pseudo-Diogenes is a very peculiar one in Byzantine history. Anna Komnene denigrated him as base-born, wily and shameless man, prone to drink, but he nevertheless displayed extraordinary qualities: he was able to create a following within Constantinople itself, secure the support of the Cumans, and in his attempt to win over Bryennios, he displayed accurate knowledge of the dynastic ties uniting the various members of the Byzantine upper aristocracy.

By supporting Constantine Diogenes, Vladimir II Monomakh married off his daughter Maritsa (Maria) to him. She gave birth to Vasilko Leonovich. With the marriage, Vladimir II tried to take control at least over Byzantine towns along the Danube and weaken the Byzantine Empire. In 1116, Monomakh started the last Rus' campaign against Byzantinum, which he lost.

== Sources ==
- Cheynet, Jean-Claude (1996). Pouvoir et Contestations à Byzance (963–1210) (in French). Paris: Publications de la Sorbonne. ISBN 978-2-85944-168-5.
- Dawes, Elizabeth A., ed. (1928). The Alexiad. London: Routledge & Kegan Paul. Archived from the original on 2014-08-14.
- Skoulatos, Basile (1980). Les personnages byzantins de l'Alexiade: Analyse prosopographique et synthèse [The Byzantine Personalities of the Alexiad: Prosopographical Analysis and Synthesis] (in French). Louvain-la-Neuve and Louvain: Bureau du Recueil Collège Érasme and Éditions Nauwelaerts. OCLC 8468871.
