= Eustasius of Bourges =

6th-century priest and bishop of Bourges

Eustache also known as Eustace or Eustase of Bourges or Autun where he originated, was a 6th-century priest who became bishop of Bourges. He trained at the Abbey of Saint-Symphorien, Autun.

Eustache first became deacon and archdeacon of Autun, was elected archbishop of Bourges, after the death of Severe Sulpice on 29 January 591 and was the 20th to occupy the episcopal see, he left to his successor Apolinaire. In Bourges the Roman Catholic Church honoured him as a saint on 31 December.
