= Eustathios Kymineianos =

Eustathios Kymineianos (Greek: Εὐστάθιος Κυμινειανός; fl. 1087–1107) was a senior Byzantine eunuch official and admiral under Emperor Alexios I Komnenos (r. 1081–1118).

== Biography ==
Eustathios' life is known only through the Alexiad of Alexios I's daughter, Anna Komnene. He first appeared in 1087, when Alexios was hosting the Seljuq emir of Nicaea, Abu'l-Qasim in Constantinople. Despite the peace treaty between the two, Alexios decided to use the emir's absence to erect a new fortress to counter the Turks' recent conquest of Nicomedia. Eustathios was sent with a small fleet laden with materials and builders to construct it. To prevent the Turks from reacting, he treated them with every courtesy and claimed that Abu'l-Qasim himself was allowing this work to proceed, all the while impeding any ships to sail from the coasts of Bithynia and notify the emir. Through this ruse, Eustathios was successful in his task.

He next appeared in 1095 at Tzouroulos, when he took custody of the captured rebel who claimed to be a son of Romanos IV Diogenes (r. 1068–71), and had invaded Byzantium with the aid of the Cumans. Before leading him on to Constantinople, Eustathios had him blinded. A few years later, in 1101/2, during Alexios' war with Bohemond I of Antioch and his nephew Tancred, while Tancred was besieging Laodicea, Eustathios was sent with a fleet to seize and refortify the island of Korykos and the port of Seleucia on his rear. It is probably at this time, that he was raised from the post of kanikleios (keeper of the imperial inkpot, usually a confidante of the emperor) to that of admiral (megas droungarios tou ploïmou). Eustathios accomplished his task swiftly, and after leaving strong garrisons on both places, returned to Constantinople.

He appeared for the last time in 1107, when Alexios named him, along with Nikephoros Dekanos, governor of Constantinople while the emperor was on a campaign against Bohemond in the western Balkans.

== Sources ==
- Skoulatos, Basile (1980). Les personnages byzantins de l'Alexiade: Analyse prosopographique et synthèse [The Byzantine Personalities of the Alexiad: Prosopographical Analysis and Synthesis] (in French). Louvain-la-Neuve and Louvain: Bureau du Recueil Collège Érasme and Éditions Nauwelaerts.
