= List of municipalities in Tekirdağ Province =

This is the List of municipalities in Tekirdağ Province, Turkey as of October 2007.

== Municipalities ==
List is sorted alphabetically A-Z, as Districts->Municipalities.

District	Municipality
Çerkezköy	Çerkezköy
Çerkezköy	Kapaklı
Çerkezköy	Karaağaç
Çerkezköy	Kızılpınar
Çerkezköy	Veliköy
Çorlu	Çorlu
Çorlu	Marmaracık
Çorlu	Misinli
Çorlu	Ulaş
Çorlu	Velimeşe
Çorlu	Yenice
Hayrabolu	Çerkezmüsellim
Hayrabolu	Hayrabolu
Hayrabolu	Şalgamlı
Malkara	Balabancık
Malkara	Kozyörük
Malkara	Malkara
Malkara	Sağlamtaş
Marmara Ereğlisi	Marmara Ereğlisi
Marmara Ereğlisi	Sultanköy
Marmara Ereğlisi	Yeniçiftlik
Muratlı	Muratlı
Saray	Beyazköy
Saray	Büyükyoncalı
Saray	Saray
Şarköy	Hoşköy
Şarköy	Mürefte
Şarköy	Şarköy
Tekirdağ (Merkez)	Banarlı
Tekirdağ	Barbaros
Tekirdağ	Karacakılavuz
Tekirdağ	Kumbağ
Tekirdağ	Tekirdağ

== Changes in 2014 ==
According to Law act no 6360, belde (town) municipalities within provinces with more than 750000 population (so called Metropolitan municipalities in Turkey) were abolished as of 30 March 2014. 22 belde municipalities in the above list are now defunct. The list is kept for historical reference.
