= Istanbul–Kapıkule railway =

High-speed rail line in Turkey

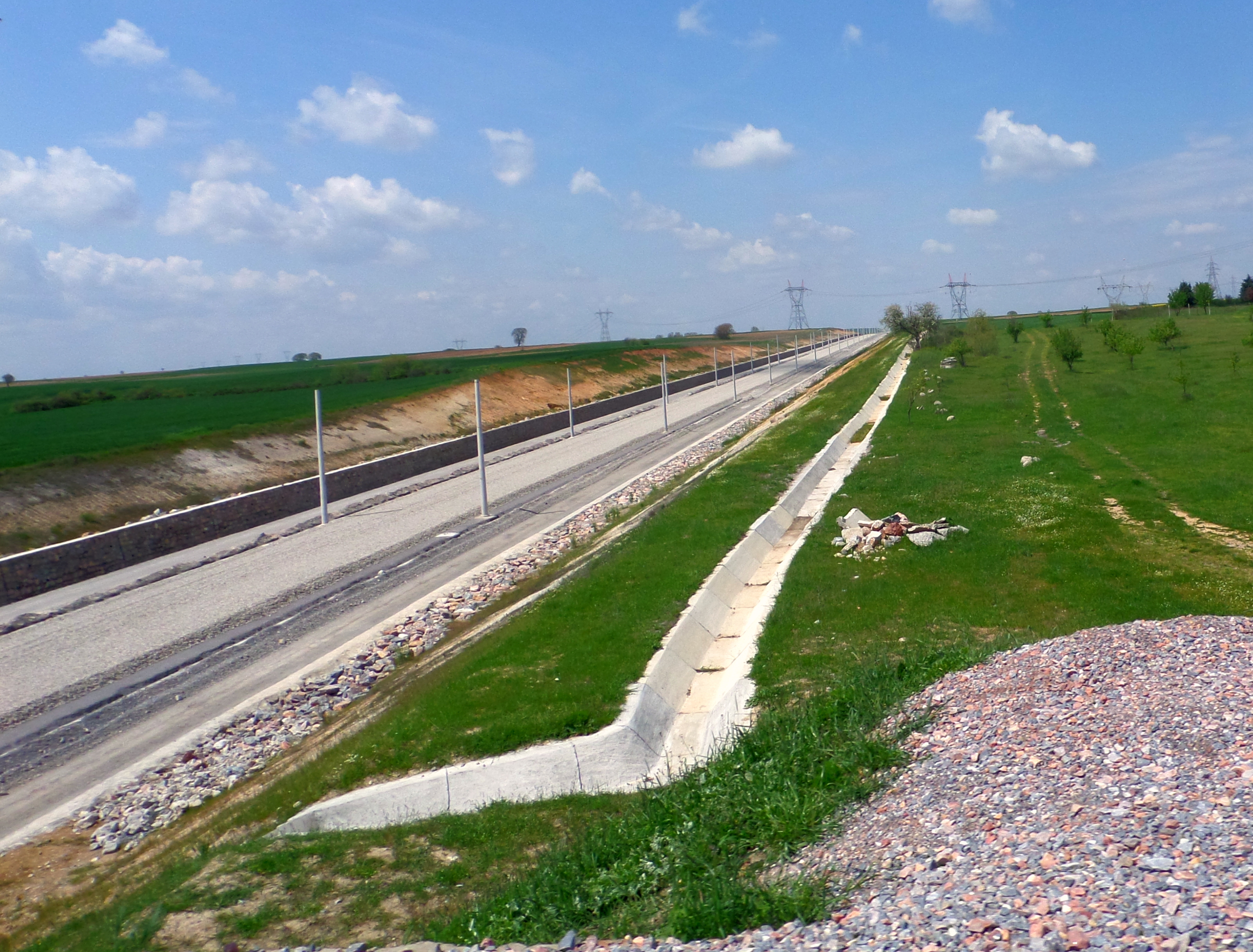

Overview
- Status: Operational
- Owner: Turkish State Railways
- Locale: East Thrace
- Termini: Halkalı, Turkey; Kapıkule, Turkey

Service
- Type: Heavy rail, High-speed rail
- System: TCDD
- Depot(s): Halkalı Yard, Edirne Yard, Kapıkule Yard

History
- Opened: 9 October 2026 (Çerkezköy-Kapıkule)

Technical
- Line length: 229 km (142 mi)
- Number of tracks: Double track
- Character: Mainline
- Track gauge: 1,435 mm (4 ft 8 1/2 in) standard gauge
- Electrification: 25 kV, 50 Hz AC overhead line
- Operating speed: 200 km/h (120 mph)

The Istanbul–Kapıkule railway is a 229 km (142 mi) long, partially operational high-speed rail line in Turkey. Once finished, this railway will provide a high-speed rail link between the Istanbul suburbs and the Bulgarian border, just west of Edirne. The rail line will be double tracked and electrified for its whole length, and is intended for use by both freight and passenger rail. The railway will allow for high-speed rail service between Edirne and Istanbul, and is intended to strengthen the rail transport link between Turkey and Europe. The first phase of the project, between Çerkezköy and Kapıkule opened on 9 October 2026.

== History ==
The construction is being partially financed with €275 million in EU IPA funds, of a total estimated cost of €1,000 million.

== Route ==
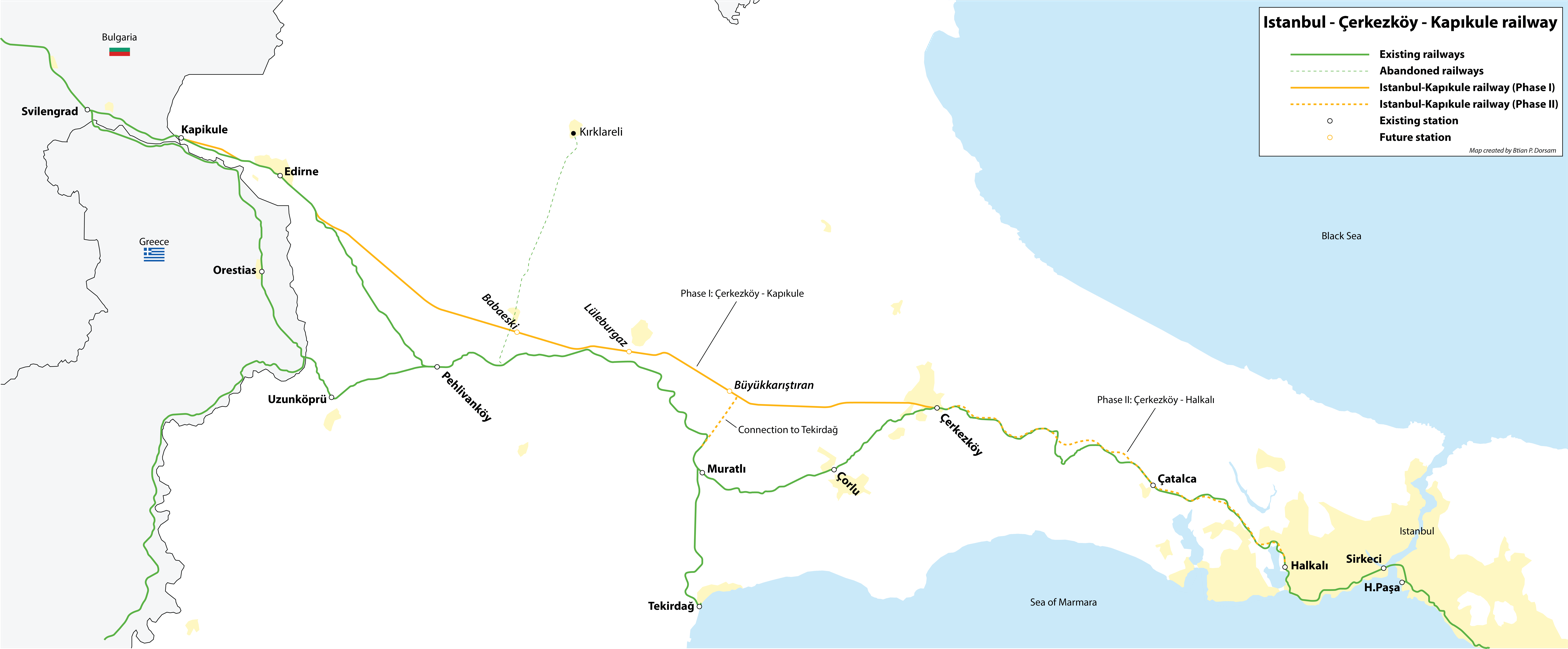
A map of the new railway and existing ones. (Click to expand)

The Istanbul-Kapikule railway will travel from Halkalı station in the Istanbul suburbs, to Kapikule station on the Bulgarian border. The line follows approximately the same corridor as line to Pythio until reaching Çerkezköy but with a smoother and shorter geometry. From Çerkezköy it gets south of the O-3 motorway and parallels it until Edirne. From Edirne onwards, it follows the same corridor as Pehlivanköy–Svilengrad until Kapıkule. The line will be passing through Lüleburgaz and Babaeski and short-cutting Çorlu and Pehlivanköy, both currently located on the main line. The Istanbul–Pythio and Pehlivanköy–Svilengrad lines will as a consequence be partly replaced (in sections where they overlap with the line), partly disused and partly become branch lines of this new main line.

== Consequences on freight transport ==
As part of environmental/logistical policies of EU and Turkey, there are continuous efforts in transferring freight transports from TIR to rail. In this logic and for cost effectiveness, it has been decided to upgrade/rebuild the old railways to allow freight train services instead of building a high-speed railway from scratch. This should also unclog the saturation of road freight transport at Kapıkule border checkpoint.

It is also planned to connect the line to the Muratlı–Tekirdağ railway with the construction of an extra new section between Büyükkarıştıran and Muratlı in order to allow freight trains to reach Tekirdağ port.
