= Kızılpınar Atatürk, Çerkezköy =

Neighborhood in Tekirdağ Province, Marmara, Turkey

Kızılpınar Atatürk
- Neighbourhood
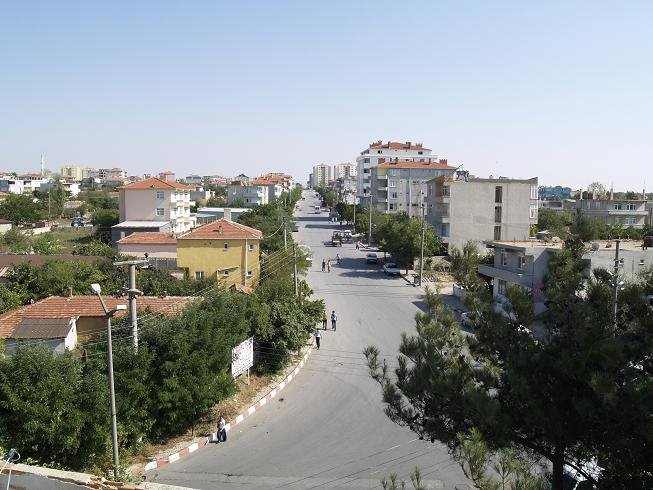
- Hürriyet Street (2009)

- Location within Çerkezköy District

- Location within Turkey Location within Marmara
- Coordinates: 41°16′06″N 27°58′00″E
- Country: Turkey
- Province: Tekirdağ
- District: Çerkezköy
- Elevation: 150 m (490 ft)
- Population (2022): 27,560
- Time zone: UTC+3 (TRT)
- Postal code: 59500
- Area code: 0282

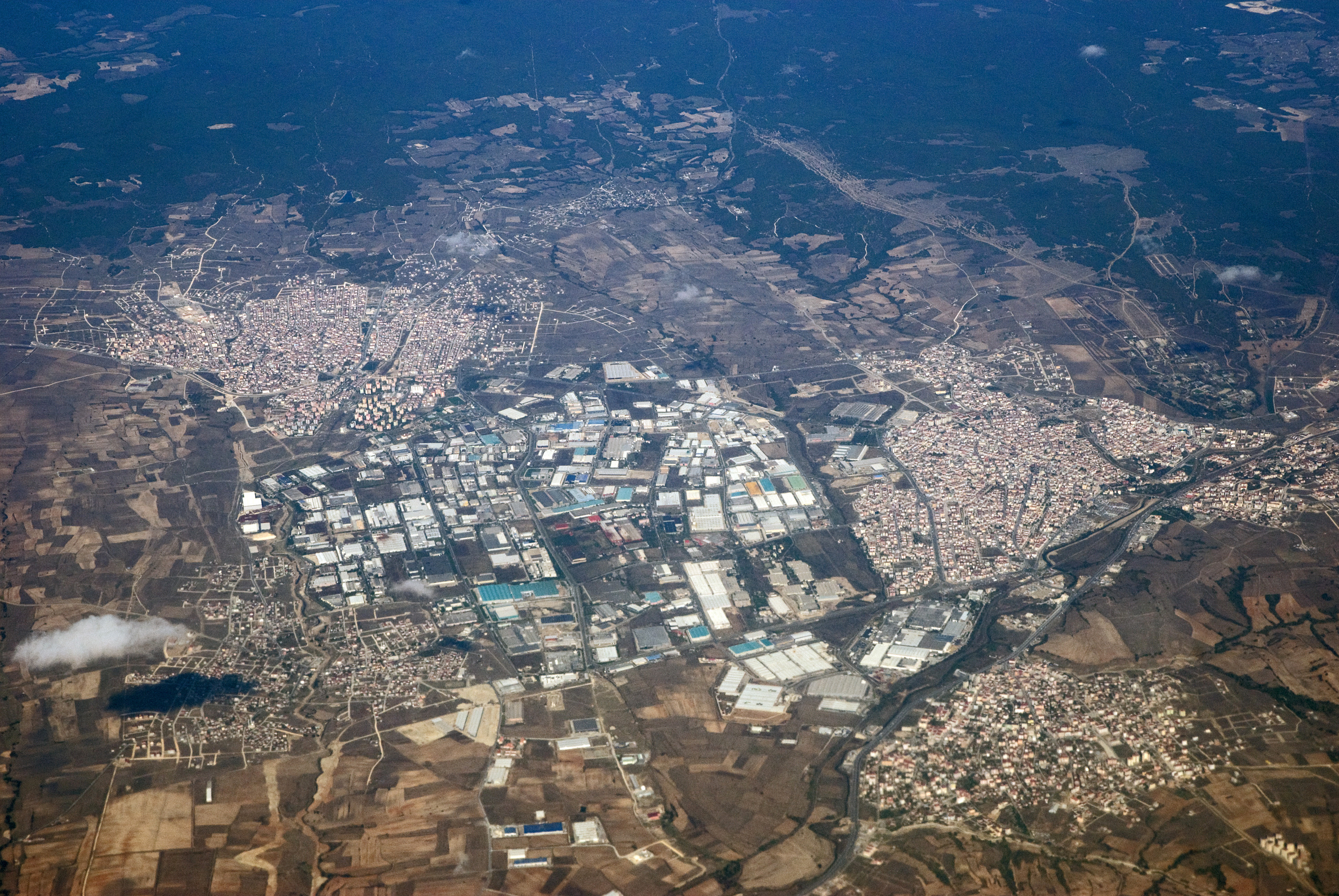
Aerial view of Çerkezköy District's industrial area between the towns of Kapaklı (upper left), Karaağaç (lower left), Çerkezköy (right), and Kızılpınar Atatürk (lower right) (October 2016)

Kızılpınar Atatürk is a neighbourhood of the municipality and district of Çerkezköy, Tekirdağ Province, Turkey. Its population is 27,560 (2022). It covers part of the former town Kızılpınar. Distance to Tekirdağ is about 55 kilometres (34 mi).
