= Gazi Osman Paşa, Çerkezköy =

Gazi Osman Paşa
- Neighbourhood
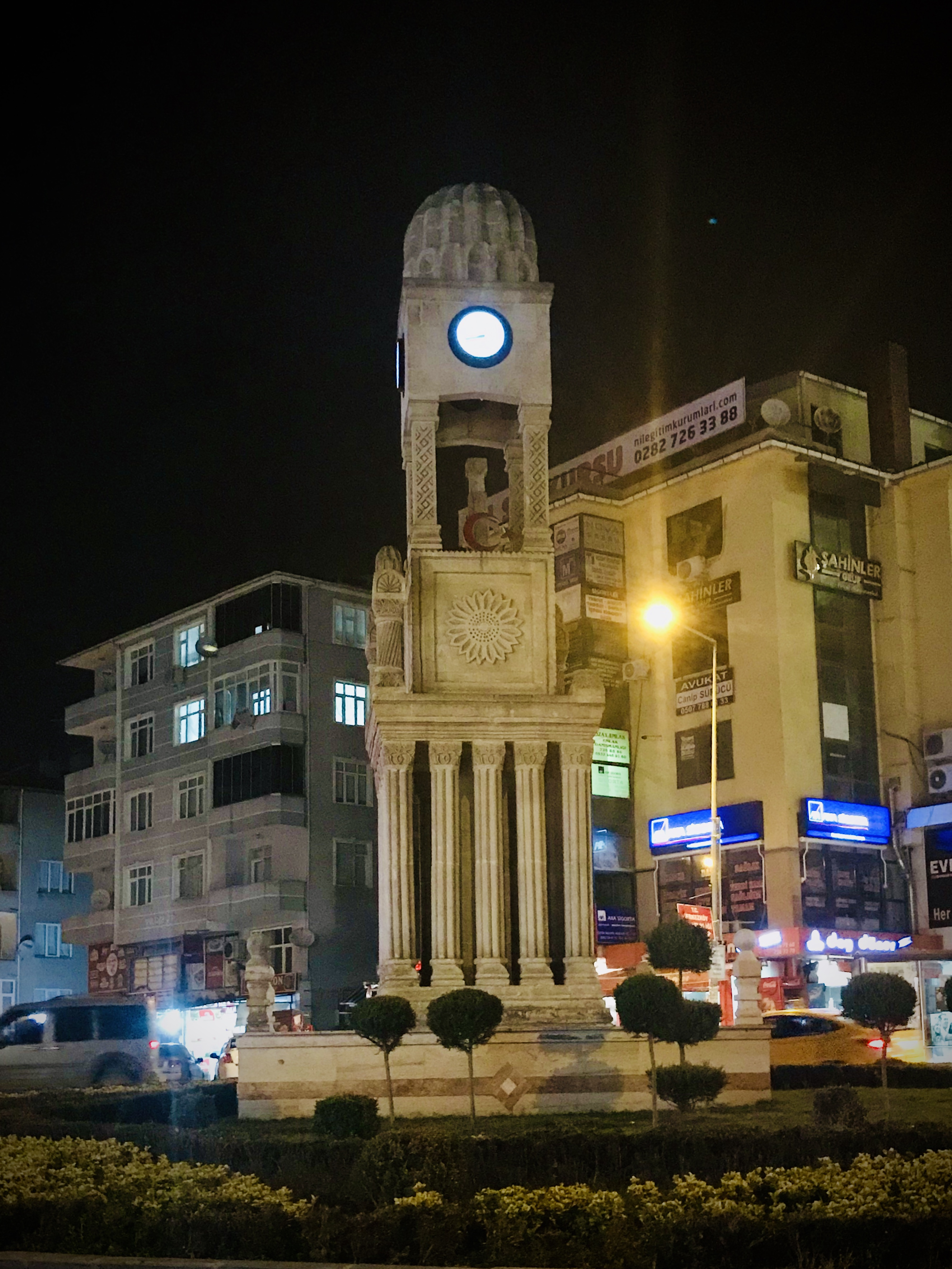
- Clock Tower in Gazi Osman Paşa (2020)

- Location within Çerkezköy District

- Location within Turkey Location within Marmara
- Coordinates: 41°17′17″N 27°59′47″E
- Country: Turkey
- Province: Tekirdağ
- District: Çerkezköy
- Elevation: 150 m (490 ft)
- Population (2022): 15,840
- Time zone: UTC+3 (TRT)
- Postal code: 59500
- Area code: 0282

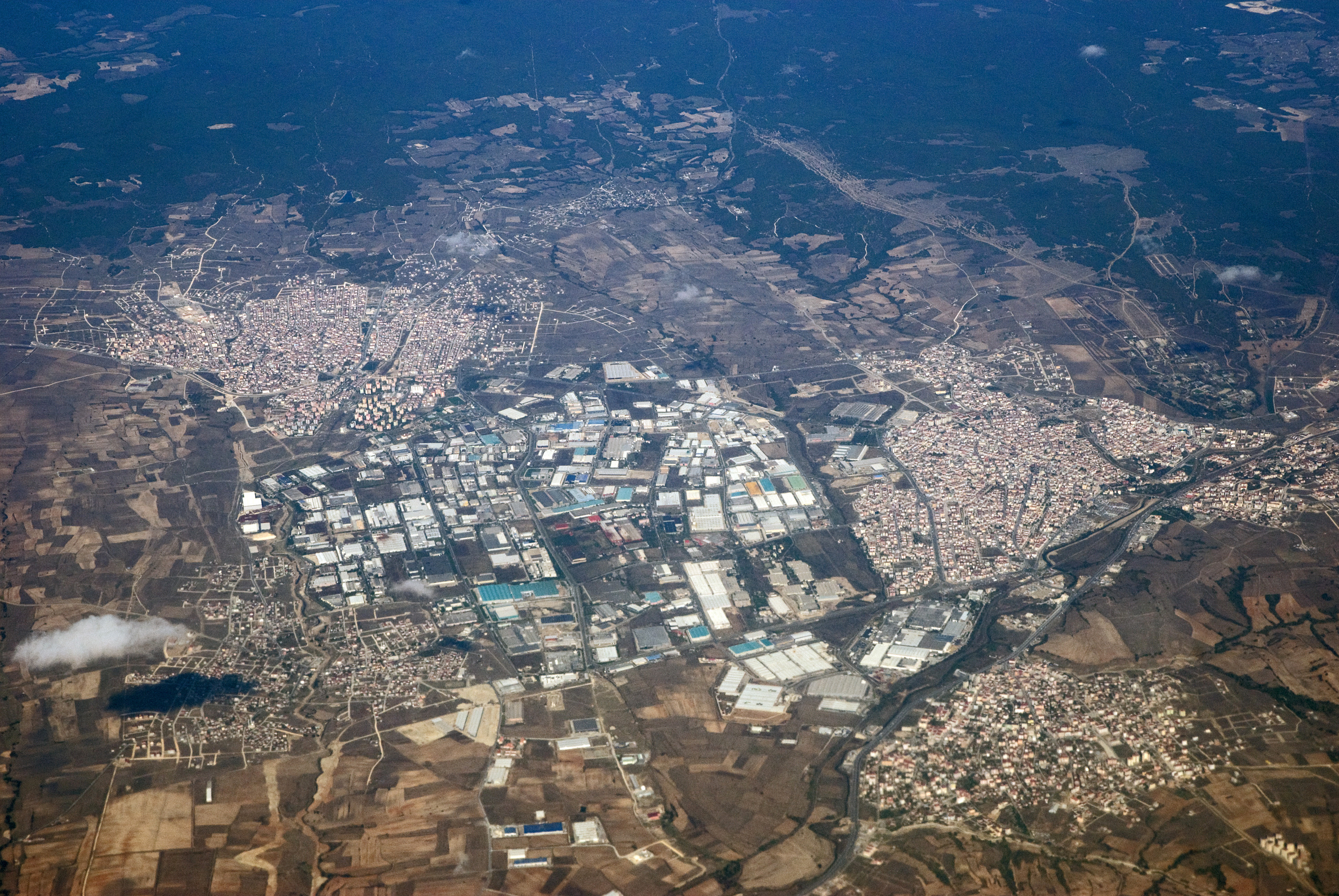
Aerial view of Çerkezköy District's industrial area between the towns of Kapaklı (upper left), Karaağaç (lower left), Çerkezköy (right) (October 2016)

Gazi Osman Paşa is a neighbourhood of the municipality and district of Çerkezköy, Tekirdağ Province, Turkey. Its population is 15,840 (2022). It covers part of the town centre of Çerkezköy. Distance to Tekirdağ is about 55 kilometres (34 mi).
