= Kızılpınar Namık Kemal, Çerkezköy =

Kızılpınar Namık Kemal
- Neighbourhood
- Location within Çerkezköy District

- Location in Turkey Kızılpınar Namık Kemal (Marmara)
- Coordinates: 41°15′41″N 27°58′07″E
- Country: Turkey
- Province: Tekirdağ
- District: Çerkezköy
- Elevation: 150 m (490 ft)
- Population (2022): 8,087
- Time zone: UTC+3 (TRT)
- Postal code: 59500
- Area code: 0282

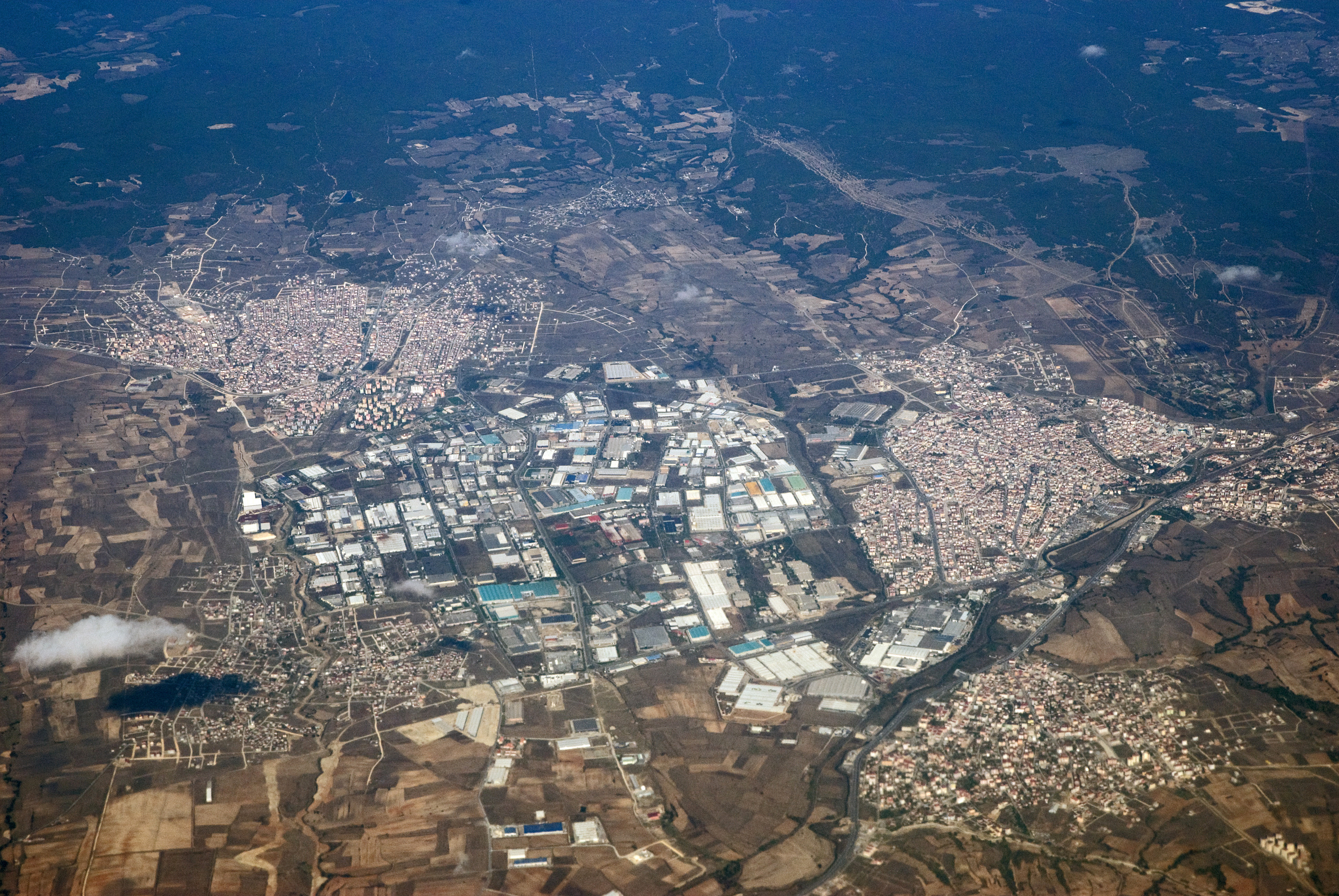
Aerial view of Çerkezköy District's industrial area between the towns of Kapaklı (upper left), Karaağaç (lower left), Çerkezköy (right), and Kızılpınar Namık Kemal (lower right) (October 2016)

Kızılpınar Namık Kemal is a neighbourhood of the municipality and district of Çerkezköy, Tekirdağ Province, Turkey. Its population is 8,087 (2022). It covers part of the former town Kızılpınar. Distance to Tekirdağ is about 55 kilometres (34 mi).
