= List of ice rinks in Turkey =

The following is a list of icerinks rinks in Turkey.

Venue	City	Opened	Capacity
Bahçelievler Ice Skating Palace	Çankaya, Ankara	1999	1,000
Kocaeli Olympic Ice Rink	İzmit Kocaeli	1999	3,600
Palandöken Ice Rink	Erzurum	2008	2,000
Erzurum GSIM Ice Rink 500	Yakutiye, Erzurum	2009	500
Erzurum GSIM Ice Rink 3,000	Yakutiye, Erzurum	2009	3,000
İBB Silivrikapı Ice Rink	Fatih, Istanbul	2009	900
İzmir Aşık Veysel Ice Rink	Bornova, İzmir	2010	1,751
Milli Piyango Curling Arena	Yakutiye, Erzurum	2010	1,000
Trabzon Curling Hall	Ortahisar, Trabzon	2017	
Samsun İlkadım Ice Rink	İlkadım, Samsun	2018	460
Tekirdağ Olympic Ice Skating Hall	Süleymanpaşa, Tekirdağ	2018	500
Zeytinburnu Ice Rink	Zeytinburnu, Istanbul	2022	2,756
Ümitköy Ice Rink	Çankaya, Ankara		
Bursa-Kestel Olympic Ice Rink	Kestel, Bursa		
Gebze Olympic Ice Rink	Gebze, Kocaeli		
