= Kızılpınar, Çerkezköy =

Kızılpınar
- Former town
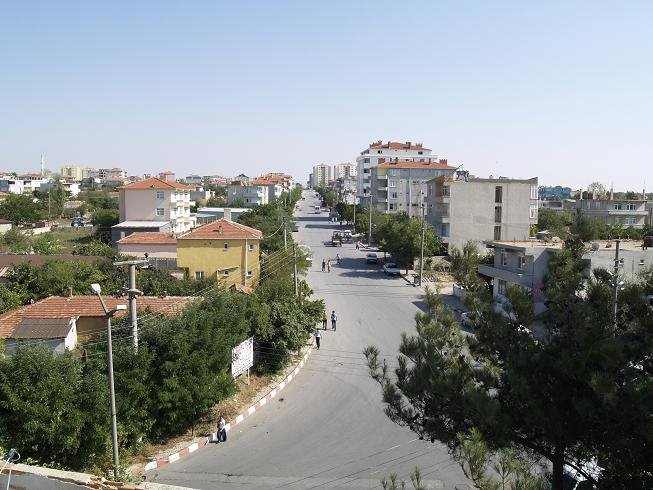
- Hürriyet Street (2009)

- Location in Turkey
- Coordinates: 41°16′N 27°58′E
- Country: Turkey
- Region: Marmara
- Province: Tekirdağ
- District: Çerkezköy
- Elevation: 150 m (490 ft)

Population (2022)
  - Total: 54,268
- Time zone: UTC+3 (TRT)
- Postal code: 59500
- Area code: 0282

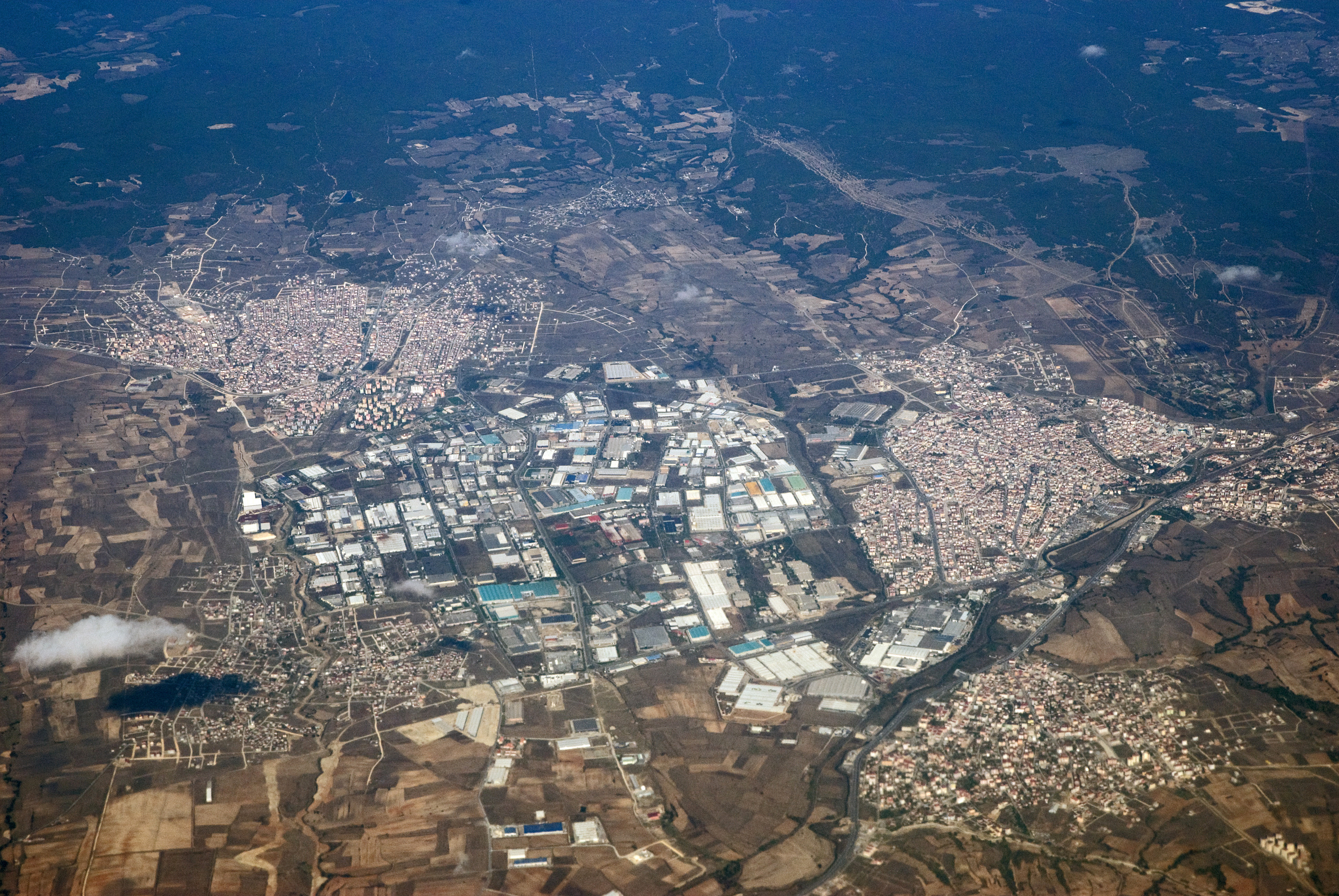
Aerial view of Çerkezköy District's industrial area between the towns of Kapaklı (upper left), Karaağaç (lower left), Çerkezköy (right), and Kızılpınar (lower right)

Kızılpınar is a former town in Çerkezköy district of Tekirdağ Province, Turkey. Before the 2013 reorganisation, it was a town (belde). It is subdivided into three mahalle: Atatürk, Gültepe and Namık Kemal. It lies directly to the southwest Çerkezköy. Distance to Tekirdağ is about 55 kilometres (34 mi). The population of Kızılpınar is 54,268 (2022). The town was founded by Muslim refugees from Bulgaria during the Russo-Turkish War (1877-1878). According to Mayor's page, some members of Malkoçoğlu Family of the Ottoman Empire were among these refugees.
