= Gazi Mustafa Kemal Paşa, Çerkezköy =

Gazi Mustafa Kemal Paşa
- Neighbourhood
- Location within Çerkezköy District

- Location in Turkey Gazi Mustafa Kemal Paşa (Marmara)
- Coordinates: 41°17′20″N 28°00′13″E
- Country: Turkey
- Province: Tekirdağ
- District: Çerkezköy
- Elevation: 150 m (490 ft)
- Population (2022): 21,297
- Time zone: UTC+3 (TRT)
- Postal code: 59500
- Area code: 0282

Gazi Mustafa Kemal Paşa is a neighbourhood of the municipality and district of Çerkezköy, Tekirdağ Province, Turkey. Its population is 21,297 (2022). It covers part of the town centre of Çerkezköy. Distance to Tekirdağ is about 55 kilometres (34 mi).
