= Mavi Jeans =

Turkish clothing company

- Company type: Public
- Traded as: BİST: MAVI
- Industry: Textile
- Founded: 1991; 35 years ago
- Founder: Sait Akarlılar
- Headquarters: Istanbul, Turkey
- Number of locations: New York City, Vancouver, Istanbul, Berlin, Frankfurt, Düsseldorf, Hamburg and Moscow
- Area served: Worldwide
- Key people: Sait Akarlılar, Founder; Cüneyt Yavuz, CEO
- Products: Denim; Accessories; Jeans
- Revenue: ▲US$1.11 billion (2024)
- Operating income: ▲US$140 million (2024)
- Net income: ▼US$77 million (2024)
- Total assets: ▲US$567 million (2024)
- Total equity: ▲US$302 million (2024)
- Number of employees: 6,201 (2023)
- Website: www.mavi.com

Mavi is a Turkish brand of denim and jeans founded in 1991 in Istanbul, Turkey. The company manufactures jeans for both women and men, targeting a younger age group. The global operation is headquartered in Turkey, with subsidiaries in the US, Canada, Germany, Netherlands, Russia and Australia.

Mavi is a Turkish word meaning "blue".

== Retail locations ==
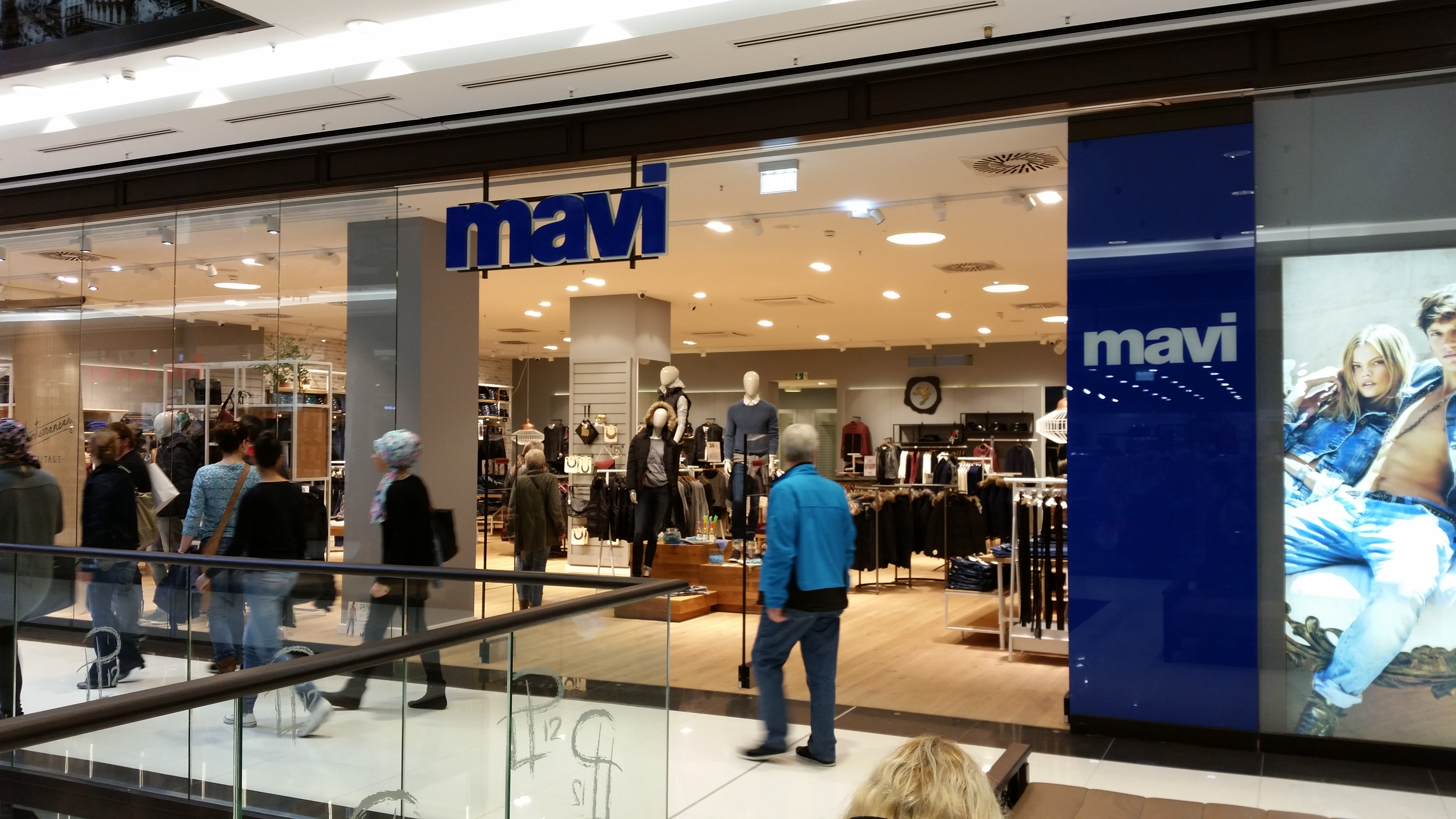
Mavi Jeans, Mall of Berlin

Mavi has flagship stores in New York City, Vancouver, Istanbul, Berlin, Frankfurt, Düsseldorf, Hamburg and Moscow.

== Marketing ==
Celebrities who wear Mavi include Kate Winslet and Chelsea Clinton. In 2012, Adriana Lima signed a contract with Mavi for a marketing campaign, and sales increased 50%.

== Production ==
The major factory of company is located in Çerkezköy, Tekirdağ Province.
