= Kumbağ =

- Neighbourhood
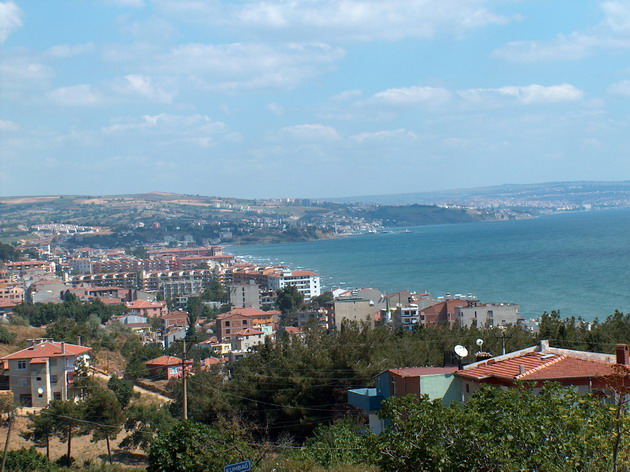

- Location within Turkey Location within Marmara
- Coordinates: 40°52′10″N 27°27′30″E
- Country: Turkey
- Province: Tekirdağ
- District: Süleymanpaşa
- Elevation: 5 m (16 ft)
- Population (2022): 2,965
- Time zone: UTC+3 (TRT)
- Postal code: 59060
- Area code: 0282

Kumbağ is a neighbourhood of the municipality and district of Süleymanpaşa, Tekirdağ Province, Turkey. Its population is 2,965 (2022). Before the 2013 reorganisation, it was a town (belde). It is situated in the Marmara Sea coast of East Thrace (the European part of Turkey), 13 kilometres (8.1 mi) to the south of Tekirdağ. The town was a Greek fishing village named Kumbos or Chrisampelos (Greek: Χρυσάμπελος) prior to Balkan Wars. After the Turkish War of Independence in 1920s, Greeks were replaced by the Turks from Greece and Bulgaria. In 1935s Turks from Romania also settled in Kumbağ. In 1993 it was declared a seat of township. With sandy beaches the main revenue of the town is tourism. Farming is another major sector.
