= Büyükyoncalı =

Büyükyoncalı Merkez Büyükmanika
- Neighbourhood
- Location in Turkey Büyükyoncalı Merkez (Marmara)
- Coordinates: 41°22′41″N 27°55′37″E
- Country: Turkey
- Province: Tekirdağ
- District: Saray
- Elevation: 130 m (430 ft)
- Population (2022): 1,988
- Time zone: UTC+3 (TRT)
- Postal code: 59600
- Area code: 0282

Büyükyoncalı Merkez is a neighbourhood of the municipality and district of Saray, Tekirdağ Province, Turkey. Its population is 1,988 (2022). Before the 2013 reorganisation, Büyükyoncalı was a town (belde). It is situated in the plains of Eastern Thrace. The distance to Saray is 8 kilometres (5.0 mi), and to Tekirdağ is 70 kilometres (43 mi).

The settlement was founded in 1861 by the Turks from Crimea who migrated to Turkey after the Crimean War. The settlement was briefly occupied by the Russians in the Russo-Turkish War (1877-1878), by the Bulgarians in the First Balkan War and by the Greeks after the First World War. Büyükyoncalı residents were banished to Milos island in the Aegean Sea. However it was returned to Turkey after the Turkish War of Independence on 1 November 1922. In 1989, Büyükyoncalı was declared a seat of township. Sunflower, corn and cereals are the main agricultural crops. Some residents also work in organized industrial sites.
