= Muratlı–Tekirdağ railway =

Muratlı-Tekirdağ railway

Overview
- Status: Operational
- Owner: Turkish State Railways
- Locale: East Thrace
- Termini: Muratlı; Tekirdağ
- Stations: 2

Service
- Type: Heavy rail
- System: TCDD Taşımacılık
- Operator(s): TCDD Taşımacılık

History
- Opened: 31 August 2010

Technical
- Line length: 31 km (19 mi)
- Number of tracks: Double track
- Track gauge: 1,435 mm (4 ft 8 1/2 in) standard gauge
- Electrification: 25 kV
- Operating speed: 100 km/h (62 mph)

The Muratlı-Tekirdağ railway (Turkish: Muratlı-Tekirdağ demiryolu) is a 31 km (19 mi) long electrified, double-track railway in East Thrace, Turkey. The railway connects the Istanbul-Pythio railway in Muratlı to the port city of Tekirdağ on the Sea of Marmara.

Construction of the railway began in 2007 and it was opened on 31 August 2010 by then-Minister of Transportation Binali Yıldırım as a single-track non-electrified railway. The route was later double-tracked and electrified in 2013.

Although passenger service was operated for a short period between 2010 and 2012, the route is primarily a freight railway - connecting the Port of Tekirdağ to the national railway network.
