= Samsun İlkadım Ice Sports Hall =

Ice sports venue in Samsun, Turkey

- Interactive map of Samsun İlkadım Ice Sports Hall
- Location: İlkadım, Samsun, Turkey
- Coordinates: 41°19′09″N 36°19′57″E
- Capacity: 460

Construction
- Groundbreaking: 2017
- Opened: 17 May 2018; 8 years ago
- Cost: ₺20 million (approx. US$4.2m)

Samsun İlkadım Ice Sports Hall (Turkish: Samsun İlkadım Buz Sporları Salonu) is an indoor ice rink for ice skating, ice hockey and curling in the İlkadım district of Samsun, northern Turkey.

The construction of the Samsun İlkadım Ice Sports Hall began before the 23rd Summer Deaflympics held in Samsun in July 2017. It was opened on 17 May 2018. Built by the Ministry of Youth and Sports, it cost ₺20 million (approx. US$4.2m). It is the first ice rink in the Black Sea region of Turkey.

Situated at Cedit Mah., Bafra Cad. 77 in İlkadım district of Samsun, the venue is home to ice skating, ice hockey and curling competitions. As of 2026 tickets for the 45 minute public ice skating sessions are only sold on the door, there is no website but times may be shown on https://en.wikivoyage.org/wiki/Samsun#Do.

The venue is home to the clubs İlkadım 55 GSK, Amisos Akademi GSK and Samsun GSK Derneği. One group of the Turkish Curling Second League matches are played in the ice rink.

== See also ==
- List of ice rinks in Turkey
