= Karacakılavuz =

- Neighbourhood
- Location in Turkey Karacakılavuz (Marmara)
- Coordinates: 41°08′N 27°21′E
- Country: Turkey
- Province: Tekirdağ
- District: Süleymanpaşa
- Elevation: 150 m (490 ft)
- Population (2022): 2,658
- Time zone: UTC+3 (TRT)
- Postal code: 59070
- Area code: 0282

Karacakılavuz is a neighbourhood of the municipality and district of Süleymanpaşa, Tekirdağ Province, Turkey. Its population is 2,658 (2022). Before the 2013 reorganisation, it was a town (belde). It is situated to the northwest of the artificial pond named after the town. The distance to Tekirdağ is 32 kilometres (20 mi).

According to a popular legend the settlement was named after a roe deer (Turkish: karaca) which acted as a guide (Turkish: kılavuz) to the pursuing hunters and directed them to the location of the settlement. However, former name of the settlement during the Ottoman Empire was Karacakuloğuz (Dark servant Oğuz) which diminishes the plausibility of the legend. The oldest tombstones in the graveyard of the settlement are dated 1730. In 1884-1885, Turks from Sevlievo (whom had recently fallen under Bulgaria) were settled in the settlement. In 1971 the settlement was declared a seat of township. The town economy depends on agriculture. The main crops produced are wheat, sun flower, canola and fodder.
