= Çerkezköy =

- District and municipality
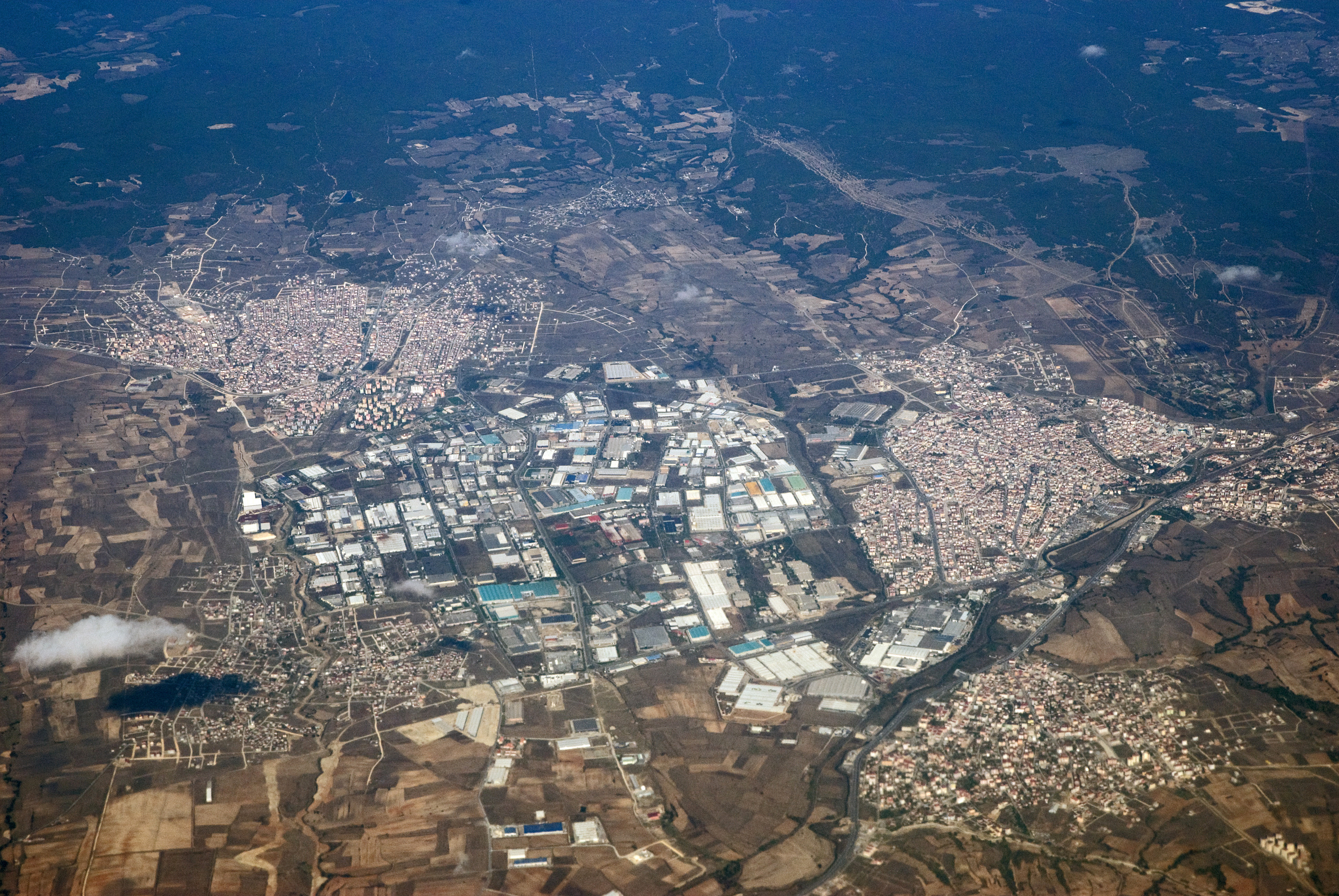
- Aerial view of Çerkezköy District's industrial area between the towns of Kapaklı (upper left), Karaağaç (lower left), Çerkezköy (right), and Kızılpınar (lower right)

- Logo

- Map showing Çerkezköy District in Tekirdağ Province

- Location within Turkey Location within Marmara
- Coordinates: 41°17′20″N 28°00′15″E
- Country: Turkey
- Province: Tekirdağ

Government
  - Mayor: Vahap Akay (Ind.)
- Area: 86 km^{2} (33 sq mi)
- Population (2022): 206,829
  - Density: 2,400/km^{2} (6,200/sq mi)
- Time zone: UTC+3 (TRT)
- Postal code: 59500
- Area code: 0282
- Website: www.cerkezkoy.bel.tr

Çerkezköy is a municipality and district of Tekirdağ Province, Turkey. Its area is 86 km^{2}, and its population is 206,829 (2022). Çerkezköy is located in inland Thrace just to the west of the outlying Istanbul districts of Çatalca and Silivri. Çerkezköy is an industrial area. It is 56 km (35 mi) from Tekirdağ and 110 km (68 mi) from Istanbul but in many ways has closer links to the bigger city. The mayor is Vahap Akay (Independent).

== History ==
Until the 1800s this was a village called 'Türbedere'. 'Türbe' is the Turkish for 'tomb' and the village took its name from the tomb of the eldest son of sultan Bayezid I, Süleyman Çelebi, who was murdered here in 1410 when fleeing from his brothers during the Ottoman Interregnum. The tomb was destroyed by Bulgarian troops when they occupied the town for nine months during the war for Bulgarian Independence in 1912.

Çerkezköy was founded as a settlement for refugees from the Caucasus following the Russo-Turkish War of 1877-1878 ('Çerkez' being the Turkish pronunciation of 'Circassian'). Soon after, following the independence of Bulgaria from the Ottoman Empire further waves of refugees from Bulgaria came to replace the Caucasians and Çerkezköy was designated as a municipality (Turkish: belediye) in 1911. It became a township of Saray district in 1922 and a district in 1958.

The land here is flat, watered by the River Çorlu and good soil for farming, so until the 1970s Çerkezköy was a pleasant small town in a rural setting. But it is also on the main highway from Istanbul to Europe and in 1971 was designated an area for industrial development. Grants were made available by the Turkish state for investors and a large industrial area was constructed on 4 km^{2} (1.5 sq mi) of land near the town.

At the 2013 Turkish local government reorganisation part of the district of Çerkezköy was detached to form the new district Kapaklı.

== Çerkezköy today ==
Today industrial development has spread beyond the originally designated industrial area and all kinds of goods are produced in the hundreds and hundreds of factories in Çerkezköy, including textiles, plastic and rubber goods, paints and chemicals. Prominent manufacturers include the large white goods manufacturers Arçelik or BSH, automotive parts producers, textile plant of Mavi or Sabancı Holding's woollen textile factory Yünsa.

Now only 15% of the people work in agriculture and Çerkezköy has a large industrial working class population, living in housing projects sprawled around the fringes of the town. The Caucasusian identity that gave the town its name no longer exists, it has been swamped by an influx of people from all over Turkey. There are jobs here and the town is easily reached by bus from Istanbul.

The town centre is a typical Turkish collection of rows of grey low-rise blocks containing public buildings, small supermarkets, banks, and kebab restaurants, with a square in the middle containing a statue of Mustafa Kemal Atatürk and nearby a large central mosque.

The military base in Çerkezköy is Turkey's biggest centre for basic training in military service. The town is well equipped with schools, hospitals and other infrastructure.

== Transportation ==
The D567 (İstanbul-Tekirdağ Road) passes along the eastern limits of the town while the İstanbul-Çerkezköy road passes through the town center. The European Highway is only 12.3 km (7.6 mi) away from the town.

The Turkish State Railways operates trains through the Çerkezköy railway station. There is a daily regional train operating to and from İstanbul as well as trains to Edirne and Uzunköprü.

Çerkezköy Railway Station gained importance after the closure of Halkali Terminal due to construction works. Almost all trains working between Turkey and Europe started to depart from here which used to have only 340 mt of ramp for loading/unloading. To prevent the congestion, TCDD constructed a new container storage area at the eastern side of terminal which allows 3 full trains to be loaded/unloaded at the same time.

The Çorlu Airport is located 17 km (11 mi) south of the town.

== Neighbourhoods ==
There are 12 neighbourhoods in Çerkezköy District:

- Bağlık
- Cumhuriyet
- Fatih
- Fevzi Paşa
- Gazi Mustafa Kemal Paşa
- Gazi Osman Paşa
- İstasyon
- Kızılpınar Atatürk
- Kızılpınar Gültepe
- Kızılpınar Namık Kemal
- Veliköy
- Yıldırım Beyazıt
