= Saray, Tekirdağ =

Saray
- District and municipality
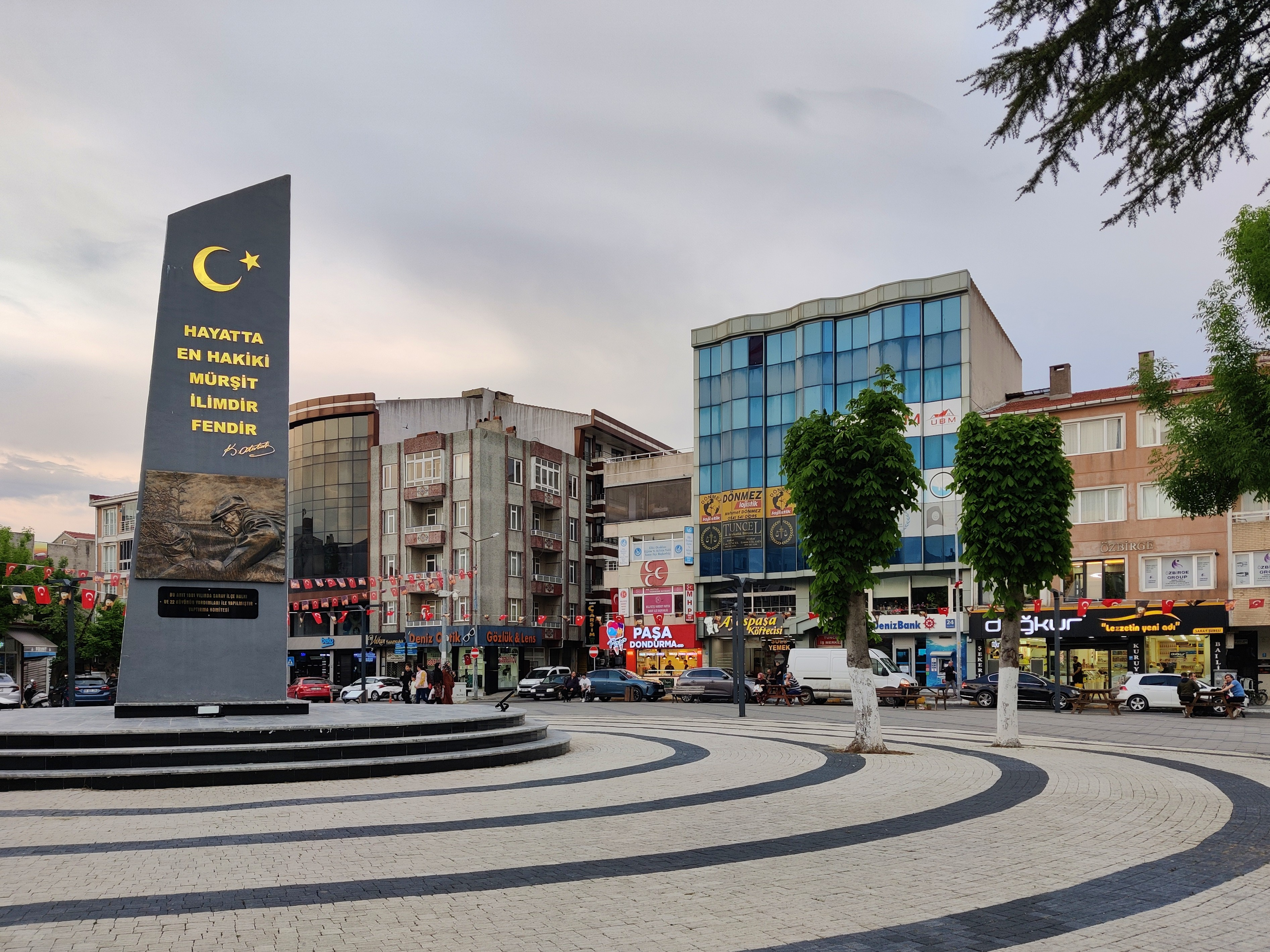
- The central square in Saray

- Map showing Saray District in Tekirdağ Province

- Location within Turkey Location within Marmara
- Coordinates: 41°26′28″N 27°55′18″E
- Country: Turkey
- Province: Tekirdağ

Government
  - Mayor: Abdül Taşyasan (CHP)
- Area: 620 km^{2} (240 sq mi)
- Elevation: 140 m (460 ft)
- Population (2022): 50,766
  - Density: 82/km^{2} (210/sq mi)
- Time zone: UTC+3 (TRT)
- Postal code: 59600
- Area code: 0282
- Website: www.saray.bel.tr

Saray is a municipality and district of Tekirdağ Province, Turkey. Its area is 620 km^{2}, and its population is 50,766 (2022). Its elevation is 140 m (460 ft). The district has cold wet winters and hot dry summers. The district governor (kaymakam) is Regaip Ahmet Özyiğit, and the mayor is Abdül Taşyasan (CHP).

Saray is situated on the junction of state roads D.020 and D.567. It is neighboured in the north by Vize, in the east by Çatalca, in the south by Kapaklı and in the west by Ergene.

== History ==
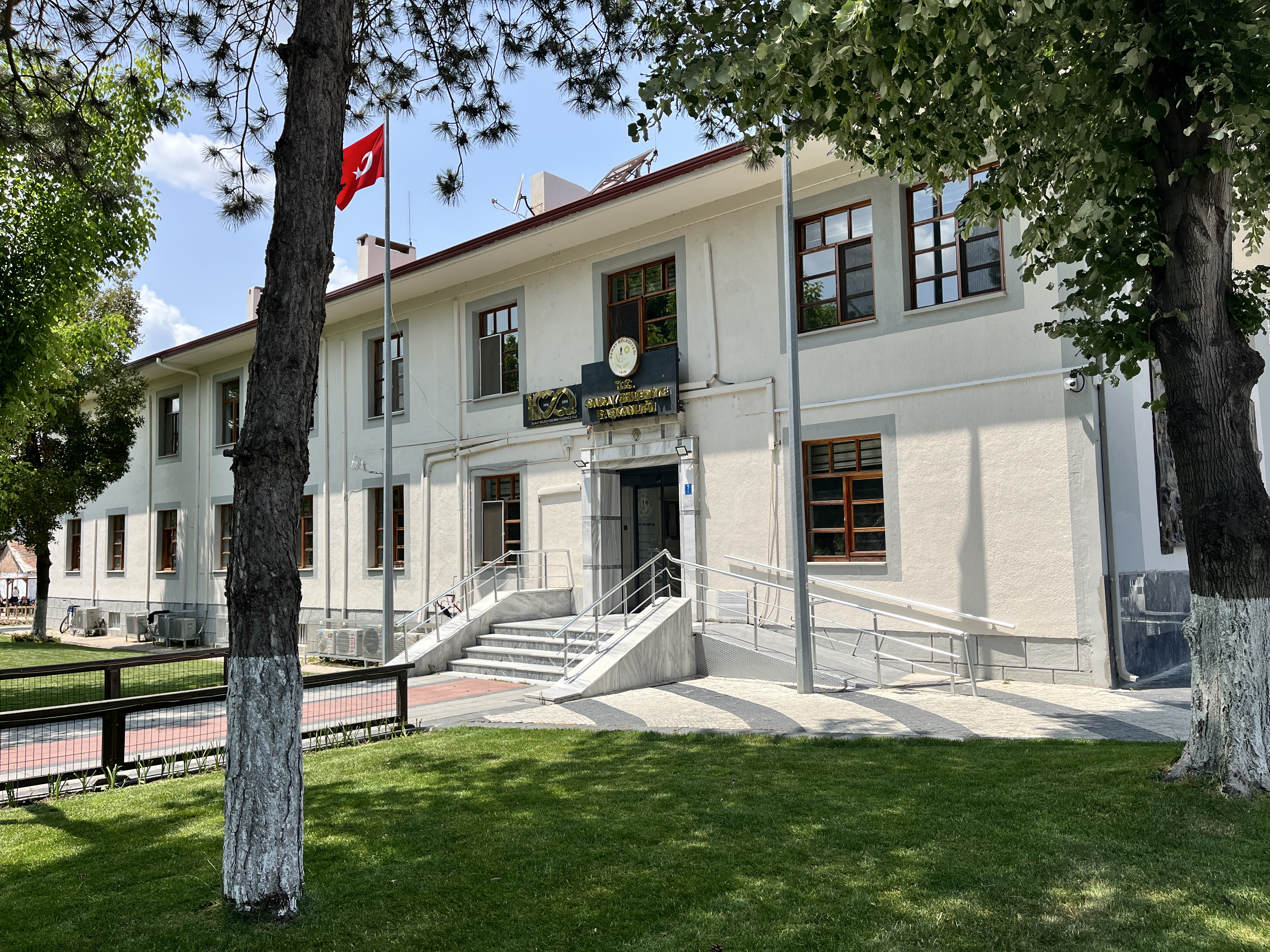
Saray Municipality building

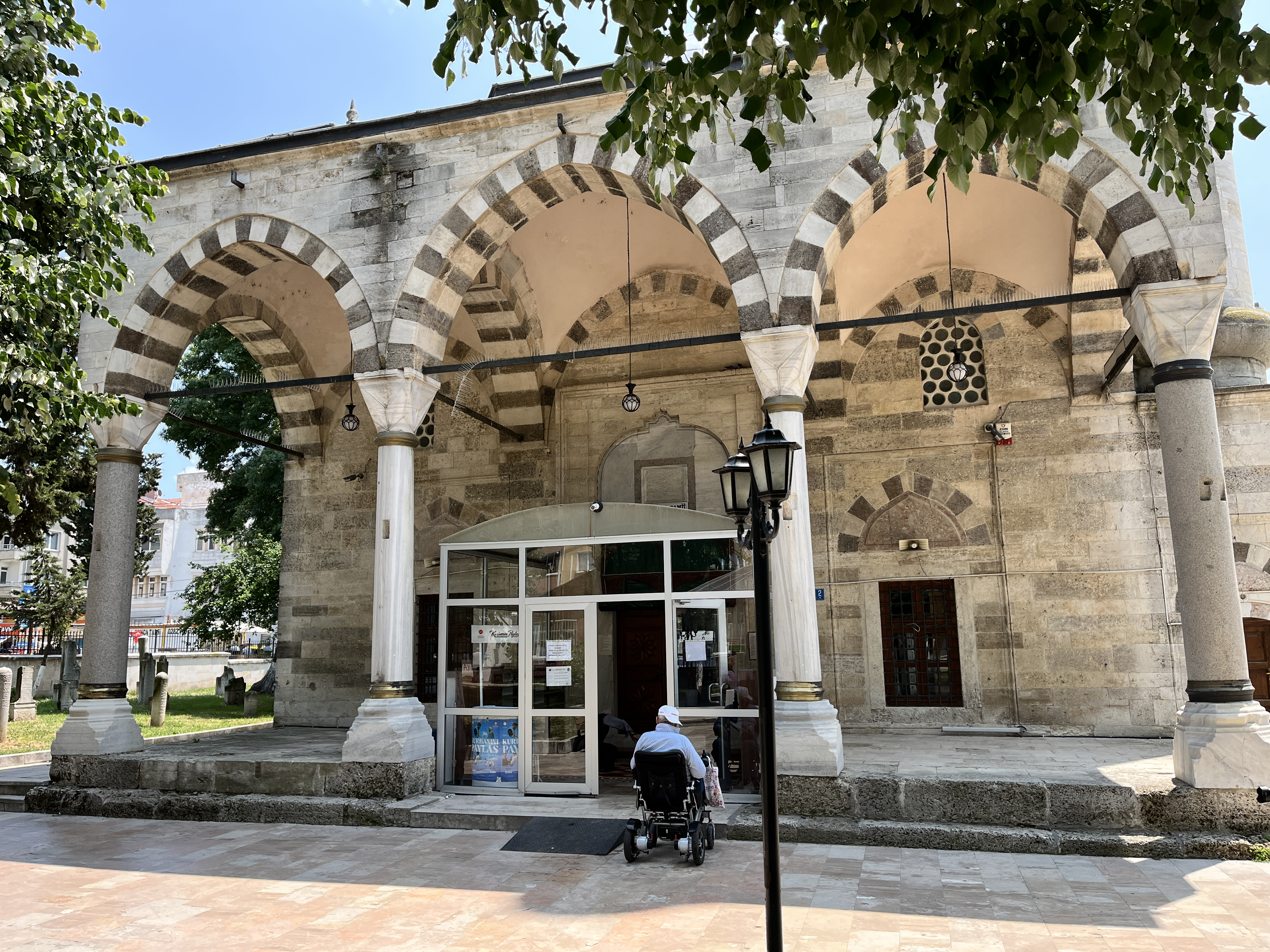
Ayas Paşa Mosque, Saray

Thrace has been settled for a long, long time and relics have been found in Saray from the stone-age and the copper-stone periods (5000 to 3000 BC), but up until the Ottoman period there were only small villages here. Then when the Ottomans established their capital in nearby Edirne, the town began to grow.

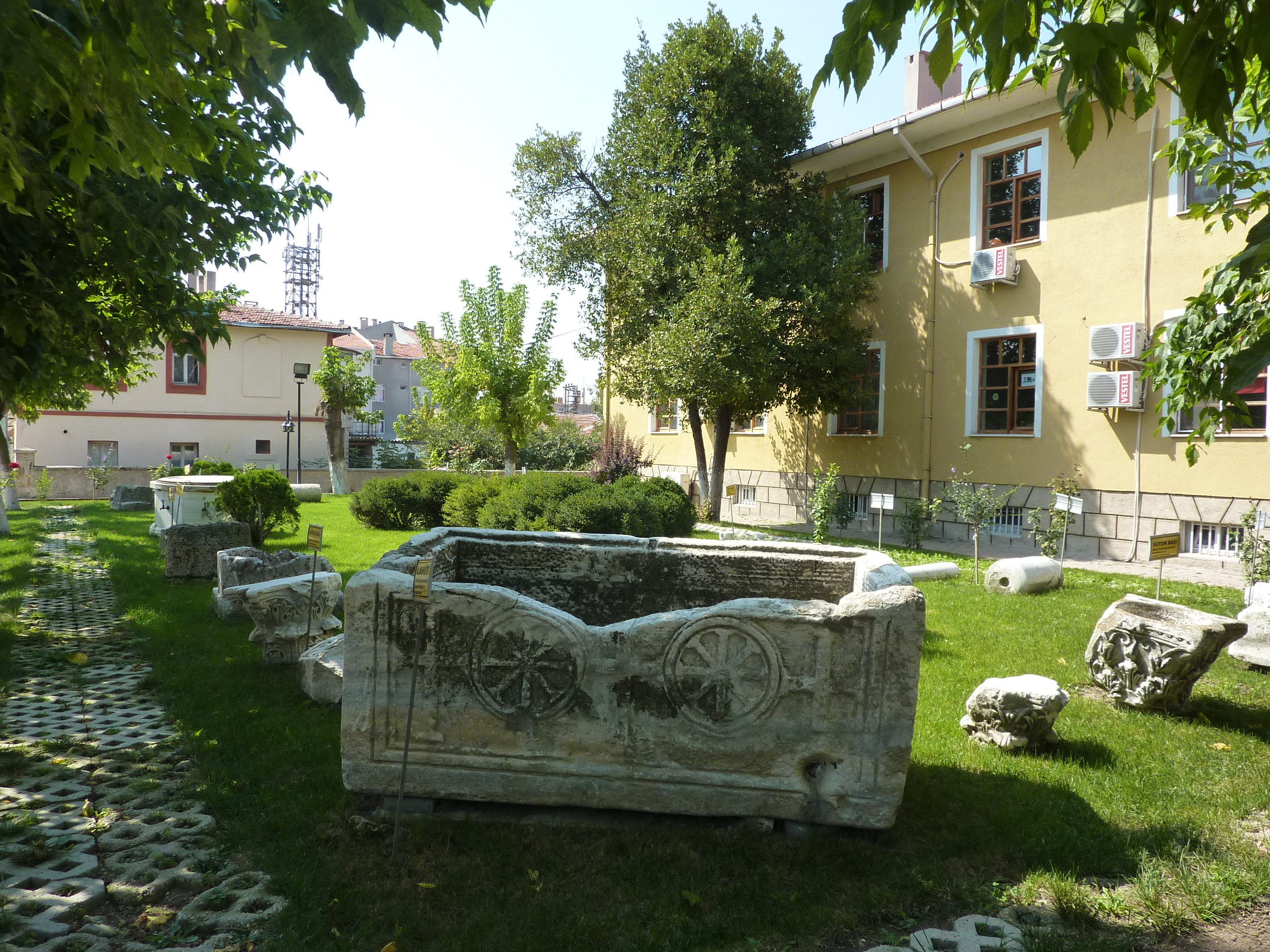
Byzantine relics in central square of Saray

In the 18th century when the Crimean Khanate fell to the Russians, the Giray family of the ruling Khans, descendants of Genghis Khan himself, were settled here by the Ottoman sultans. Many members of the dynasty are buried at the yard of Ayas Pasha Mosque in Saray. It was successively part of sanjaks of Vize, Tekfurdağı and Kırkkilise and was a nahiyah (subdivision) of Vize township in Kırkkilise sanjak before 1922.

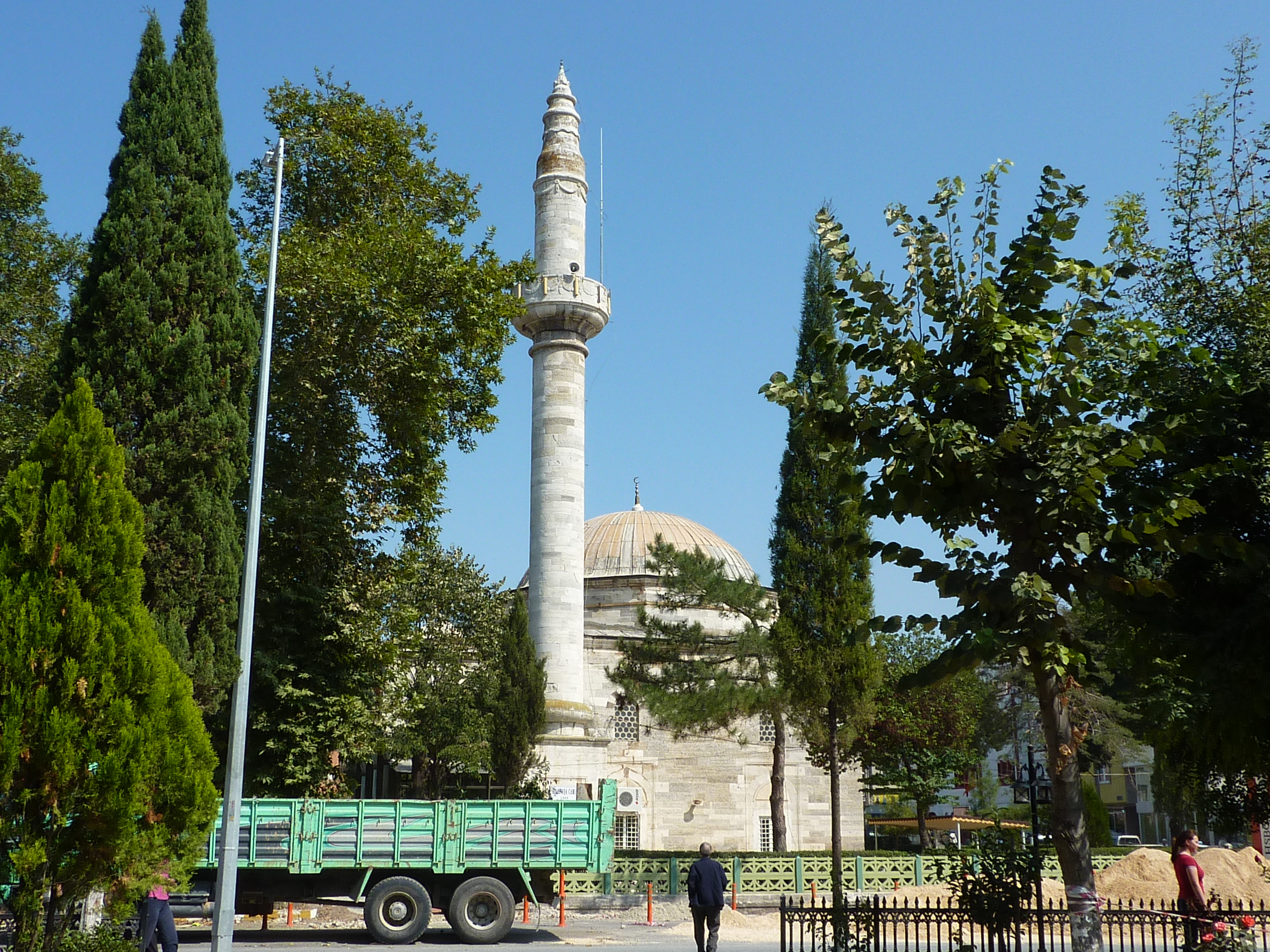
Ayas Paşa Mosque in central square of Saray

Saray was occupied by Greek troops for two years during the Turkish War of Independence between 1920 and 1922. Saray became a district in 1922 and bounded to Tekirdağ.

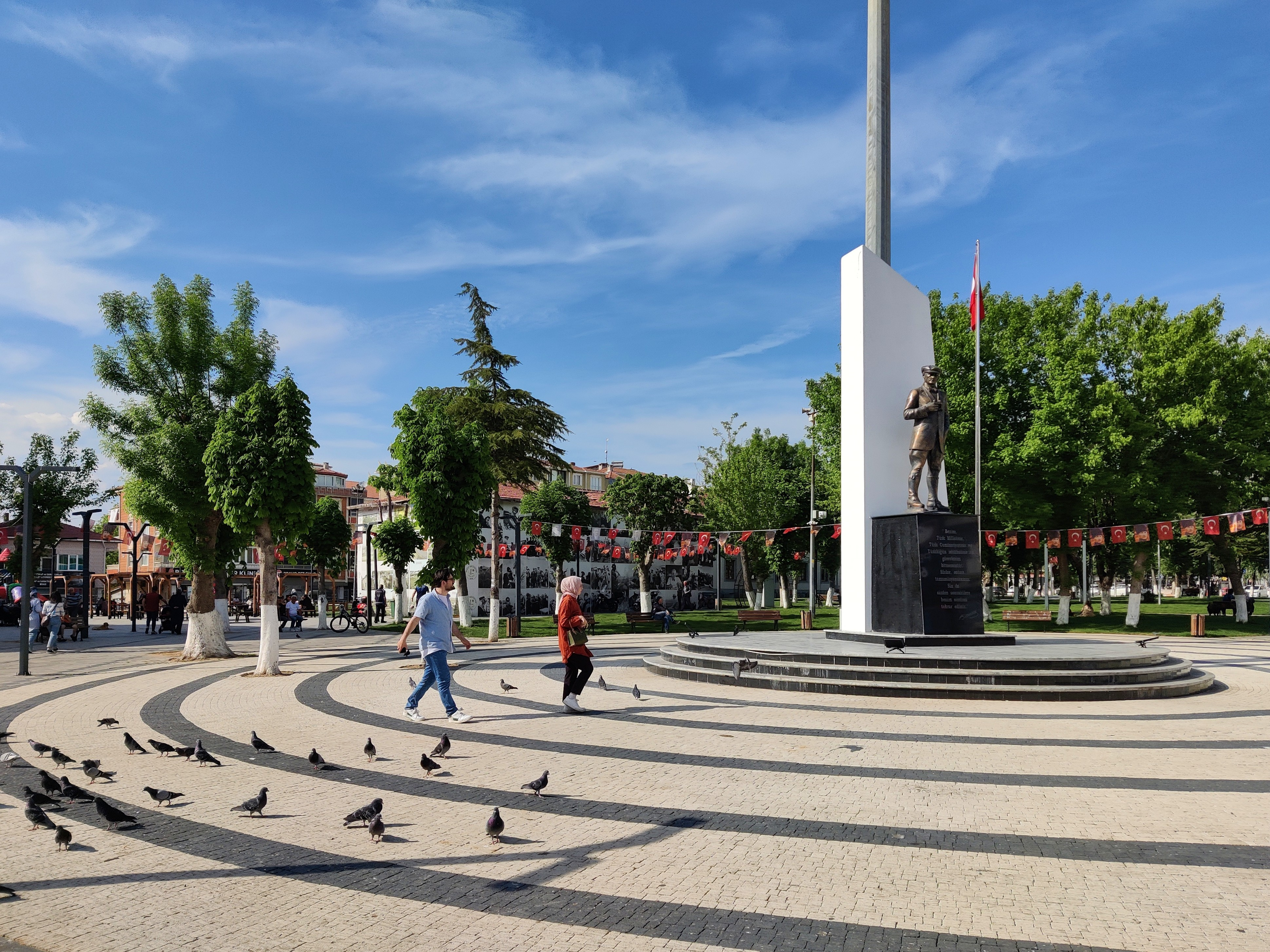
Central square in Saray

== Geography ==
Saray is 78 km (48 mi) north of the province seat Tekirdağ. The land is mostly flat and watered by the River Ergene. At the top north-east corner the land begins to rise to the Strandzha (Yıldız Dağları) range of hills. 50% of the land is farmed, 50% forest and meadow, including the only stands of Austrian Pine (pinus nigra) in Thrace, a protected area.

== Composition ==
There are 29 neighbourhoods in Saray District:

- Atatürk
- Ayaspaşa
- Ayvacık
- Aziziye
- Bahçedere
- Bahçeköy
- Beyazköy
- Bozoba
- Büyükyoncalı Merkez
- Çayla Köy
- Çukuryurt
- Cumhuriyet
- Demirler
- Edirköy
- Göçerler
- Güngörmez
- Kadıköy
- Karabürçek
- Kavacık
- Kemalpaşa
- Küçükyoncalı
- Kurtdere
- Osmanlı
- Pazarcık
- Safaalan
- Sinanlı
- Sofular
- Yeni
- Yuvalı

== Saray today ==
Unlike its neighbours Kapaklı and Ergene, Saray has not industrialised and remains a small town with high schools and other infrastructure, even some nightlife, serving the surrounding countryside. Market day is Wednesdays, and as well as fruit and vegetables, wines from Thrace and from Bulgaria can be found. However, Çorlu and Çerkezköy are only 30 minutes away, and as Saray is a much more green and pleasant environment, some people do commute to work in those industrial areas. The people are liberal and Saray is a stronghold of the centre-left CHP.

There is a military garrison here, and a prison.

== Notable natives ==
The professional football player Fatih Akyel (former Galatasaray player) was from Saray. He left playing football.

== Places of interest ==
- The caves of Güneşkaya and Güngörmez - where stone age relics have been uncovered.
- Byzantine waterworks - the remains of a system of aqueducts built to take water from the River Ergene all the way to Istanbul.
- Ayas Pasha Mosque and Hammam- mosque and Ottoman bathhouse built in 1539.
- The countryside, especially the hills to the north, leading up to the Black Sea coast are popular places for trekking at weekends.
- Çamlıkoy, formerly known as Kastro, is a small village on the Black Sea coast, popular for walking and picnics. There is a forested area of national park here too. There are a small number of holiday homes.
