= Süleymanpaşa =

- District and municipality
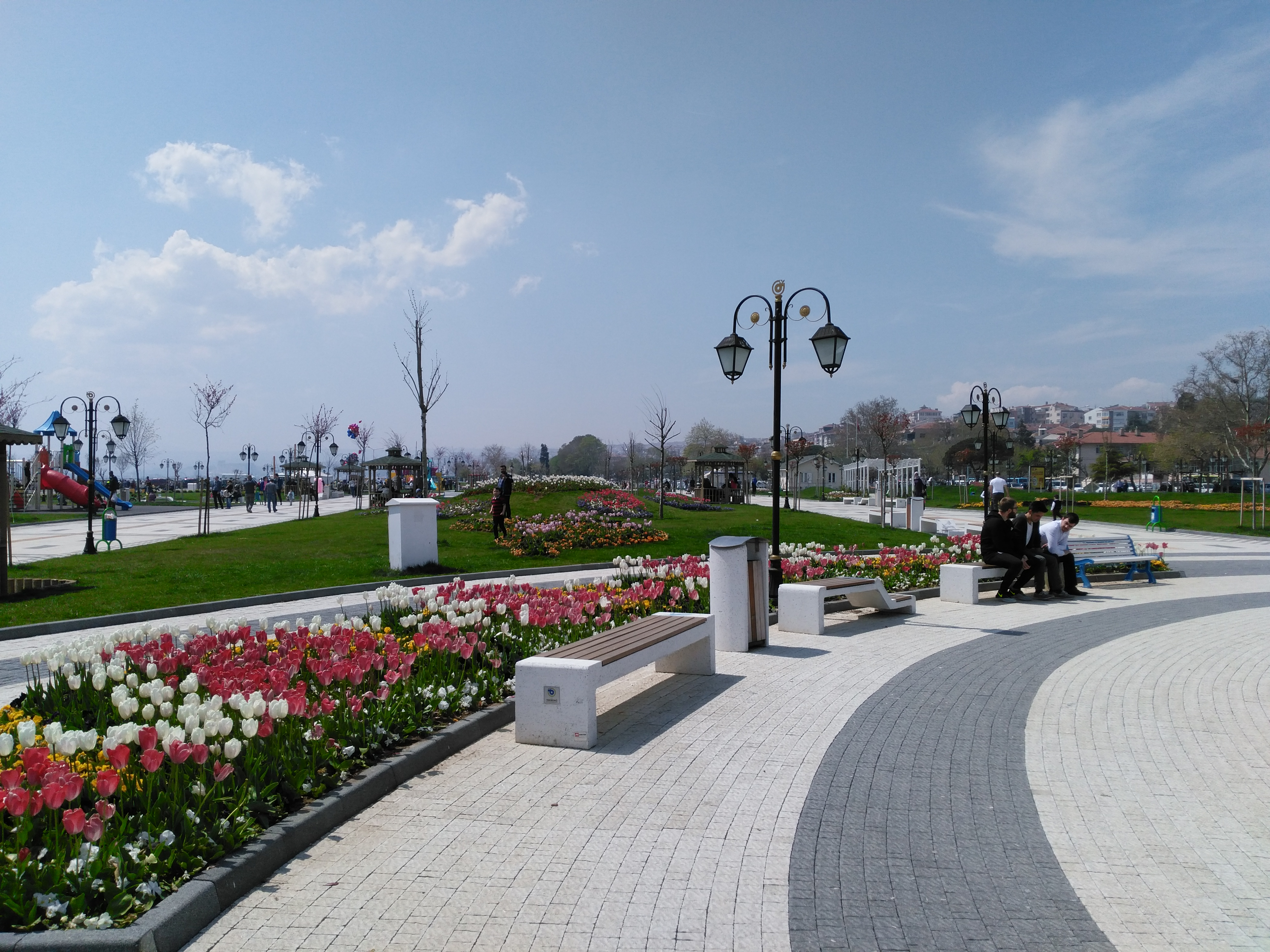
- Süleymanpaşa beach landscape

- Logo

- Map showing Süleymanpaşa District in Tekirdağ Province

- Location within Turkey Location within Marmara
- Coordinates: 40°59′N 27°31′E
- Country: Turkey
- Province: Tekirdağ

Government
  - Mayor: Volkan Nallar (CHP)
- Area: 1,053 km^{2} (407 sq mi)
- Elevation: 70 m (230 ft)
- Population (2022): 215,558
  - Density: 204.7/km^{2} (530.2/sq mi)
- Time zone: UTC+3 (TRT)
- Area code: 0282
- Website: www.suleymanpasa.bel.tr

Süleymanpaşa (Turkish: [sylejˈmanpaʃa]) is a municipality and district of Tekirdağ Province, Turkey. Its area is 1,053 km^{2}, and its population is 215,558 (2022). It covers the city of Tekirdağ and the surrounding countryside.

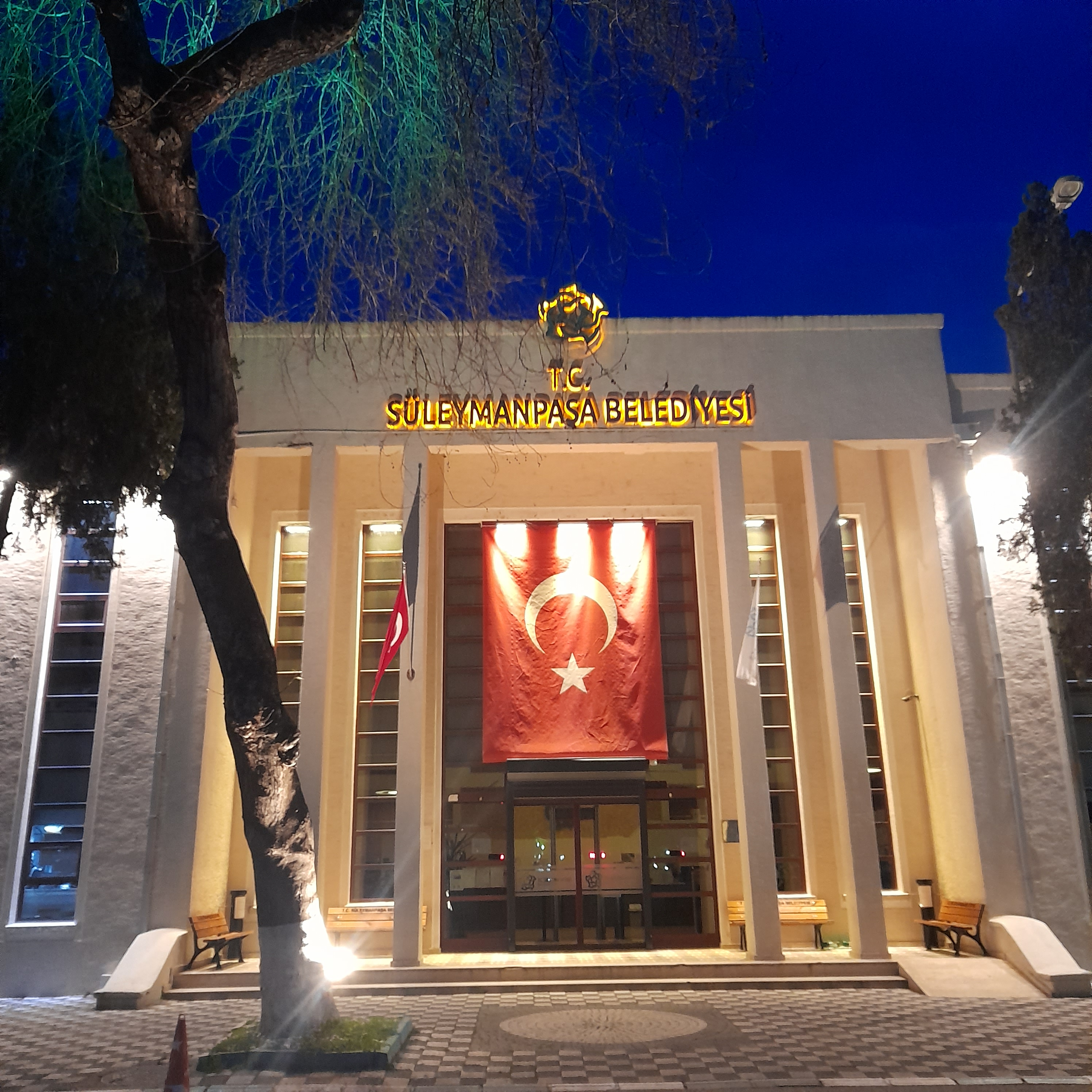
Süleymanpaşa Municipality Building

The district and municipality Süleymanpaşa was created at the 2013 Turkish local government reorganisation from the former central district of Tekirdağ. The name Süleymanpaşa refers to the Ottoman prince Süleyman, the first commander of Turkish troops in Thrace in the 14th century.

The Tekirdağ Olympic Ice Skating Hall was opened in 2018.

== Composition ==
There are 78 neighbourhoods in Süleymanpaşa District:

- 100.Yıl
- Ahmedikli
- Ahmetçe
- Akçahalil
- Altınova
- Araphacı
- Aşağıkılıçlı
- Atatürk
- Avşar
- Aydoğdu
- Bahçelievler
- Banarlı
- Barbaros
- Bıyıkali
- Çanakçı
- Çiftlikönü
- Çınarlı
- Cumhuriyet
- Dedecik
- Değirmenaltı
- Demirli
- Doğruk Karacamurat
- Ertuğrul
- Evciler
- Ferhadanlı
- Gazioğlu
- Generli
- Gündüzlü
- Güvençli
- Hacıköy
- Hürriyet
- Hüsünlü
- İnecik
- Işıklar
- İstiklal
- Karabezirgan
- Karacakılavuz
- Karaçalı
- Karadeniz
- Karaevli
- Karahalil
- Karahisarlı
- Karansıllı
- Kaşıkçı
- Kayı
- Kazandere
- Kılavuzlu
- Kınıklar
- Köseilyas
- Kumbağ
- Mahramlı
- Naip Köy
- Namık Kemal
- Nusratfakı
- Nusratlı
- Oğuzlu
- Ormanlı
- Ortaca
- Ortacami
- Oruçbeyli
- Osmanlı
- Otmanlı
- Selçuk
- Semetli
- Seymenli
- Taşumurca
- Tatarlı
- Topağaç
- Vatan
- Yağcı
- Yavuz
- Yayabaşı
- Yazır
- Yenice
- Yeniköy
- Yukarıkılıçlı
- Yuva
- Zafer

== Cherry Festival ==
The district municipality has been organizing "International Tekirdağ Cherry Festival" (Turkish: Uluslararası Tekirdağ Kiraz Festivali) each year four days long in the first or second week of June. Established under name "Cherry Jolly" ("Kiraz Cümbüşü") n 1962, the event was renamed to "Cherry Festivity" ("Kiraz Bayramı")in 1964. In later years, it included cultural and entertainment programs and became traditional. In 2020 and 2021, the event was cancelled due to the COVID-19 pandemic in Turkey. The festival features parades, illuminated processions, exhibitions, shows, night concerts, a cherry contest, a sailing contest, a festival beauty contest, picnics etc.
