= Tekirdağ Olympic Ice Skating Hall =

Ice sports venue in Tekirdağ, Turkey

- Interactive map of Tekirdağ Olympic Ice Skating Hall
- Location: Süleymanpaşa, Tekirdağ, Turkey
- Coordinates: 40.97930°N 27.48339°E
- Capacity: 500

Construction
- Groundbreaking: 2014
- Opened: 2018; 8 years ago
- Cost: ₺20 million (approx. US$3m)

Tekirdağ Olympic Ice Skating Hall (Turkish: Tekirdağ Olimpik Buz Pateni Salonu) is an indoor ice rink for ice skating, ice hockey and curling located in Süleymanpaşa district of Tekirdağ, Turkey.

The first ice rink in Tekirdağ was a temporary open-air venue established by the District Municipality of Süleymanpaşa, Tekirdağ on 7 February 2015. The temporary open-air ice rink has existed for three years until 2017 including.

The construction of the Tekirdağ Olympic İce Skating Hall began in 2014. Built by the Ministry of Youth and Sports, it was opened in 2018. It cost ₺20 million (approx. US$3m). The venue for ice skating, ice hockey and curling competitions has a seating capacity of 500.

The men's and women's teams of the Tekirdağ Curling S.K. compete in the Turkish Curling First League.
