= Muratlı =

- District and municipality
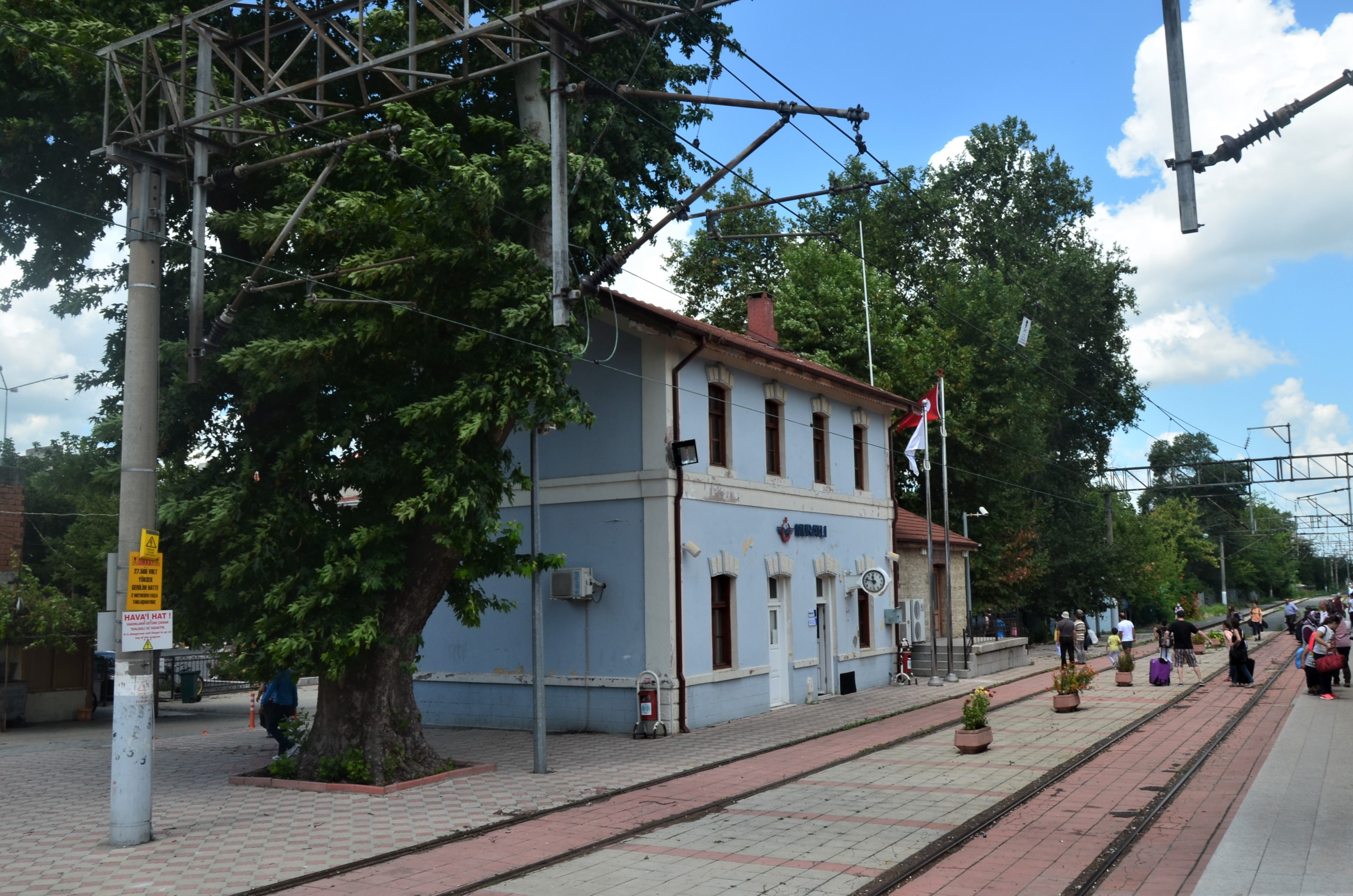
- Muratlı train station

- Map showing Muratlı District in Tekirdağ Province

- Location within Turkey Location within Marmara
- Coordinates: 41°10′27″N 27°30′31″E
- Country: Turkey
- Province: Tekirdağ

Government
  - Mayor: Varol Türel (CHP)
- Area: 388 km^{2} (150 sq mi)
- Elevation: 92 m (302 ft)
- Population (2022): 30,067
  - Density: 77.5/km^{2} (201/sq mi)
- Time zone: UTC+3 (TRT)
- Postal code: 59700
- Area code: 0282
- Website: www.muratli.bel.tr

Muratlı is a municipality and district of Tekirdağ Province, Turkey. Its area is 388 km^{2}, and its population is 30,067 (2022). It is located at 24 km north of the town of Tekirdağ and on the railway line from Istanbul to the Bulgarian border. The district has hot summers and cold winters. The mayor is Varol Türel (CHP).

== Composition ==
There are 20 neighbourhoods in Muratlı District:

- Arzulu
- Aşağısevindikli
- Aydınköy
- Balabanlı
- Ballıhoca
- Çevrimkaya
- Fatih
- Hanoğlu
- İnanlı
- İstiklal-Kurtpınar
- Kepenekli
- Kırkkepenekli
- Muradiye
- Müsellim
- Turan
- Yavaşça
- Yeşilsırt
- Yukarısevindikli
- Yukarısırt
- Yurtbekler

== Places of interest ==
- The railway station - built in 1870; the Orient Express passed through here between Istanbul and Europe.
- İnanlı Çeşmesi - a fountain built in 1914
- The house that Atatürk visited - in 1935 Atatürk ordered the construction of a settlement for Turkish refugees from Bulgaria and Romania. On 3 June 1936 he made a visit of inspection to one of the houses, commemorated by a plaque in the garden, which has "You lucky refugee don't forget 3rd of June, he became visitor to your house, he presented love to your all " written on it.
