= Karaağaç, Tekirdağ =

Karaağaç
- Neighbourhood
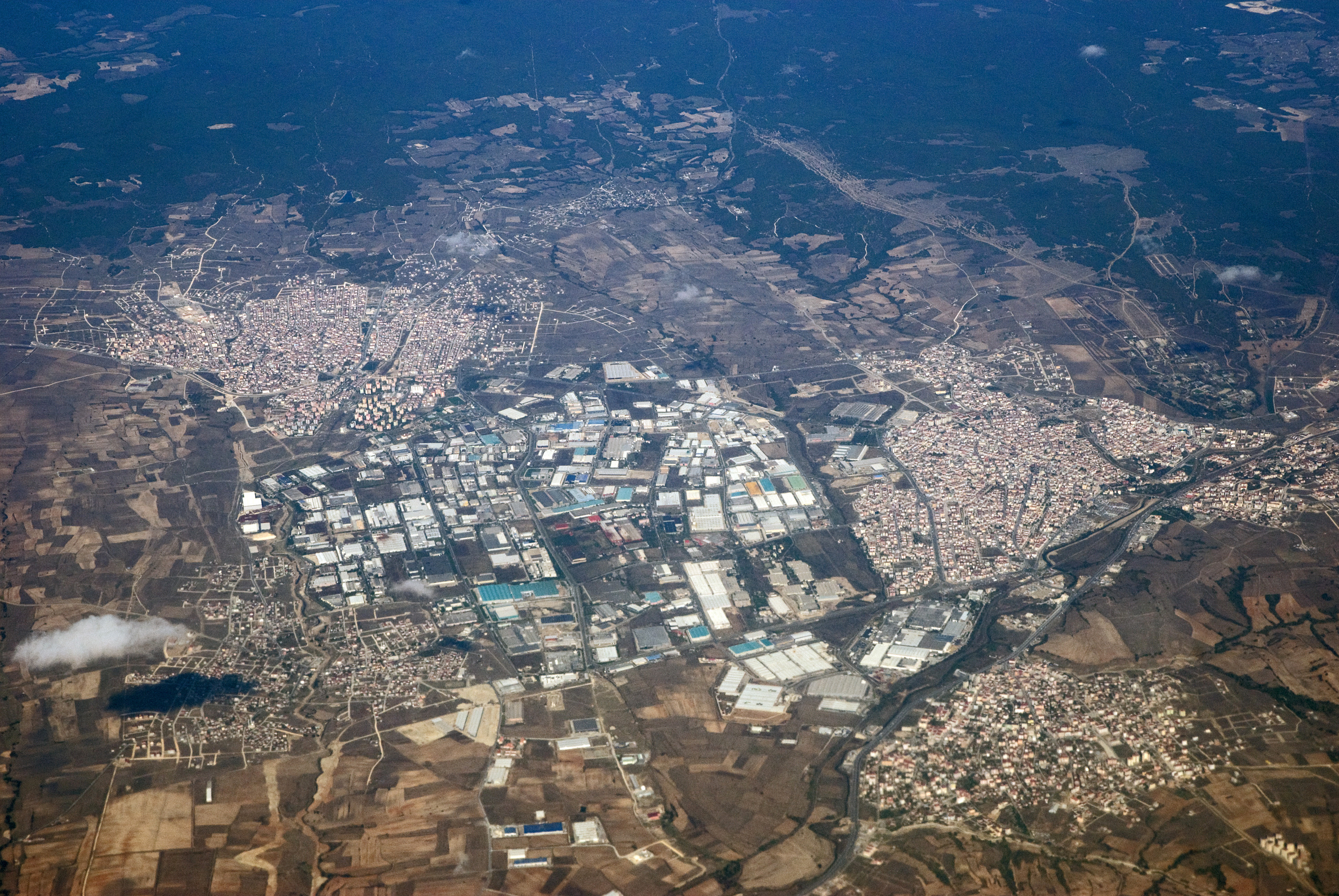
- Aerial view of the industrial area between the towns of Kapaklı (upper left), Karaağaç (lower left), Çerkezköy (right), and Kızılpınar (lower right)

- Location within Turkey Location within Marmara
- Coordinates: 41°18′N 27°57′E
- Country: Turkey
- Province: Tekirdağ
- District: Kapaklı
- Elevation: 160 m (520 ft)
- Population (2022): 5,435
- Time zone: UTC+3 (TRT)
- Postal code: 59510
- Area code: 0282

Karaağaç is a neighbourhood of the municipality and district of Kapaklı, Tekirdağ Province, Turkey. Its population is 5,435 (2022). Before the 2013 reorganisation, it was a town (belde) in the district of Çerkezköy. Karaağaç is 4 kilometres (2.5 mi) west of Çerkezköy. As it is true with other towns around, Karaağaç, formerly an agricultural town is now a settlement of industrial area.
