= Kapaklı =

- District and municipality
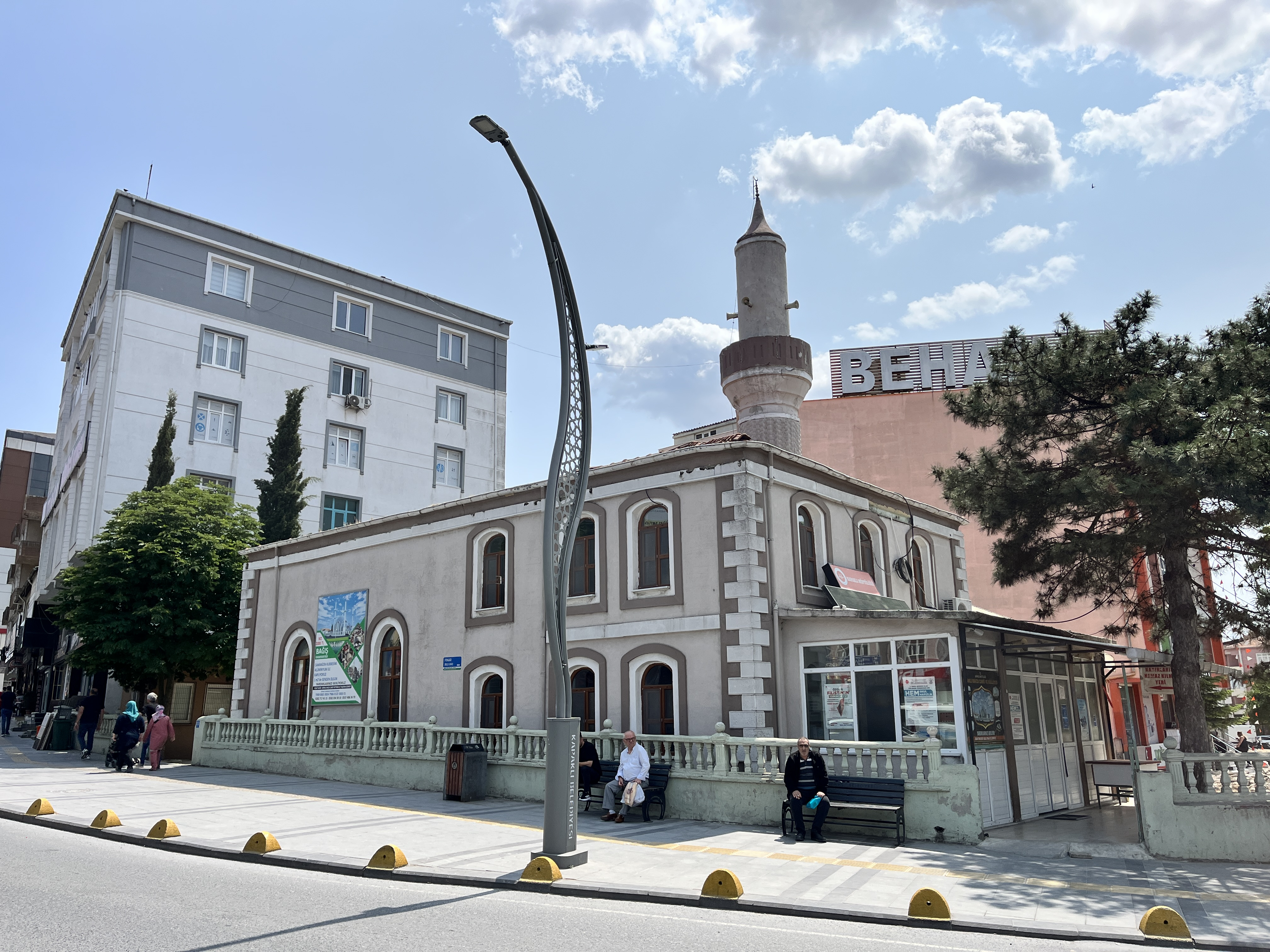
- Kapaklı Kabaklıpınar Mosque

- Logo

- Map showing Kapaklı District in Tekirdağ Province

- Location within Turkey Location within Marmara
- Coordinates: 41°20′N 27°58′E
- Country: Turkey
- Province: Tekirdağ

Government
  - Mayor: Mustafa Çetin (AKP)
- Area: 182 km^{2} (70 sq mi)
- Elevation: 185 m (607 ft)
- Population (2022): 137,514
  - Density: 756/km^{2} (1,960/sq mi)
- Time zone: UTC+3 (TRT)
- Postal code: 59510
- Area code: 0282
- Website: www.kapakli.bel.tr

Kapaklı (Turkish: [kaˈpakɫɯ]) is a municipality and district of Tekirdağ Province, Turkey. Its area is 182 km^{2}, and its population is 137,514 (2022). The district and municipality Kapaklı was created at the 2013 Turkish local government reorganisation from part of the district of Çerkezköy, including the former municipalities Kapaklı and Karaağaç.

It is situated in the plains of Eastern Thrace. The distance to Çerkezköy is merely 7 kilometres (4.3 mi) and to Tekirdağ is 60 kilometres (37 mi). The town is quite populated because of its vicinity to industrial sites and Istanbul.

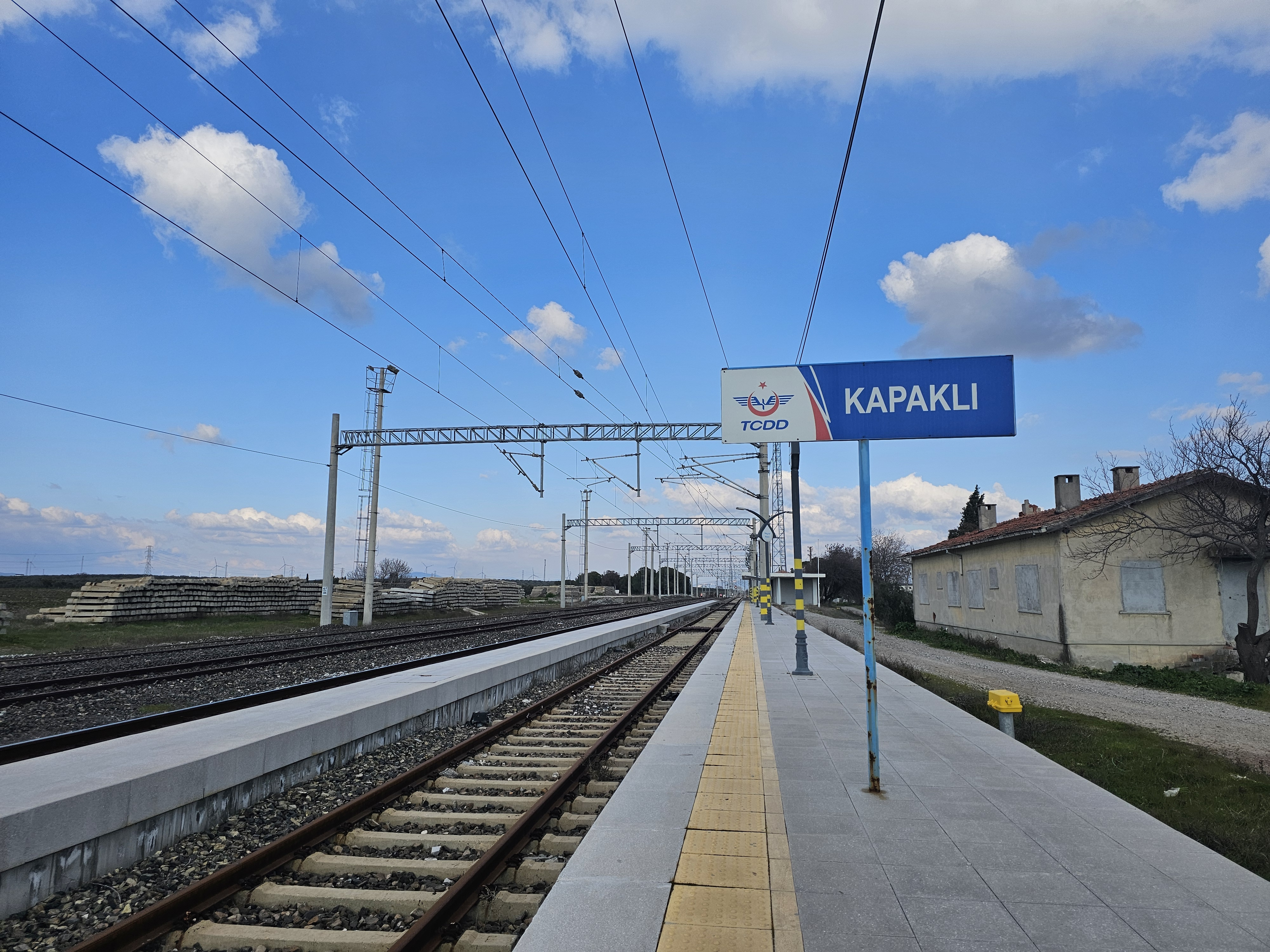
Kapaklı station.

== Composition ==
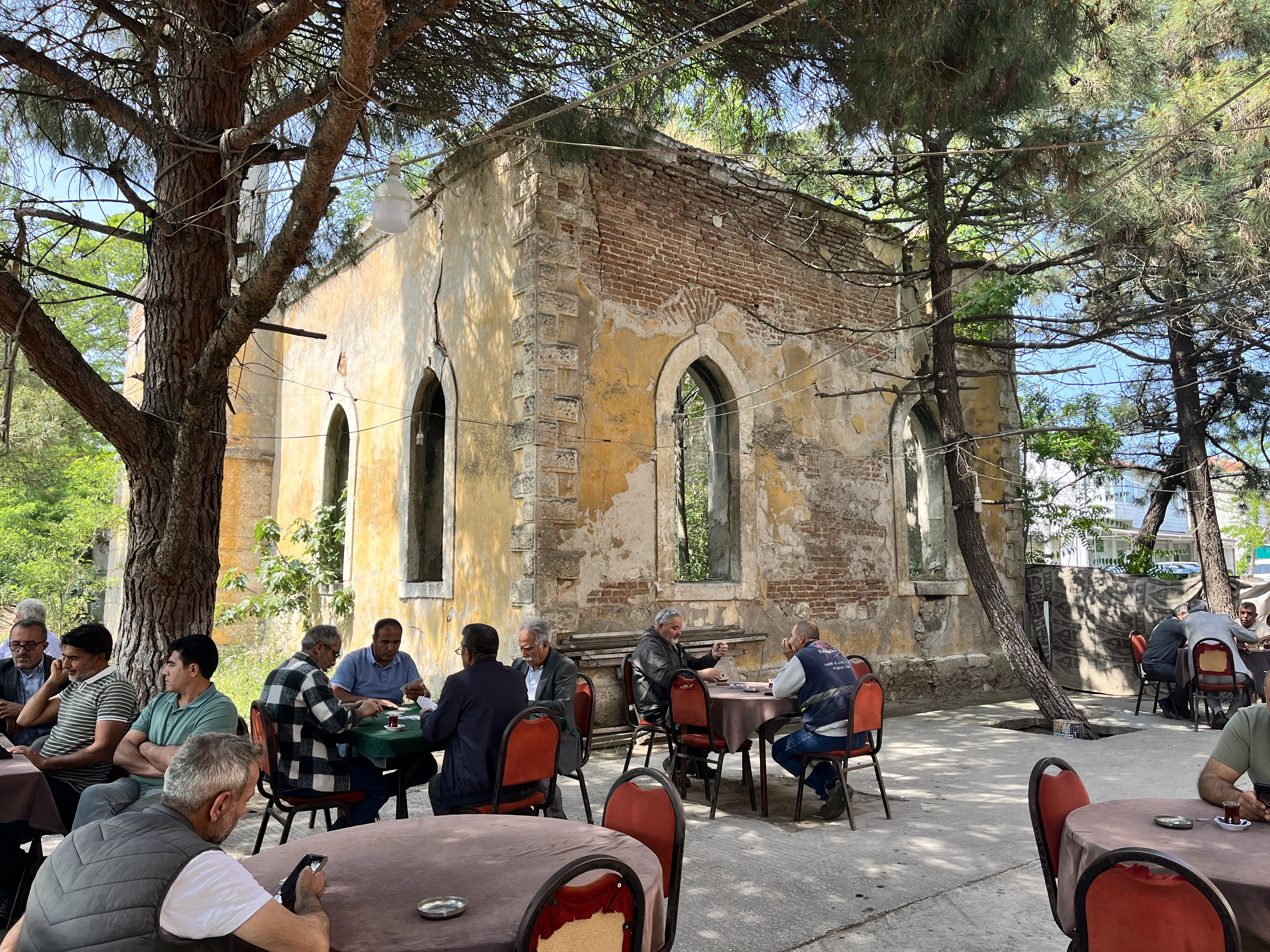
Kapaklı Karaağaç Village Mosque

There are 21 neighbourhoods in Kapaklı District:

- 19 Mayıs
- Adnan Menderes
- Atatürk
- Bahçeağıl
- Bahçelievler
- Cumhuriyet
- Fatih
- İnönü
- İsmetpaşa
- Karaağaç
- Karlı
- Kazım Karabekir
- Mevlana
- Mimar Sinan
- Ömer Halisdemir
- Pınarca
- Uzunhacı
- Vatan
- Yanıkağıl
- Yıldızkent
- Yunus Emre
