= Tekirdağ Province =

Province of Turkey

Tekirdağ Province Tekirdağ ili
- Province and metropolitan municipality
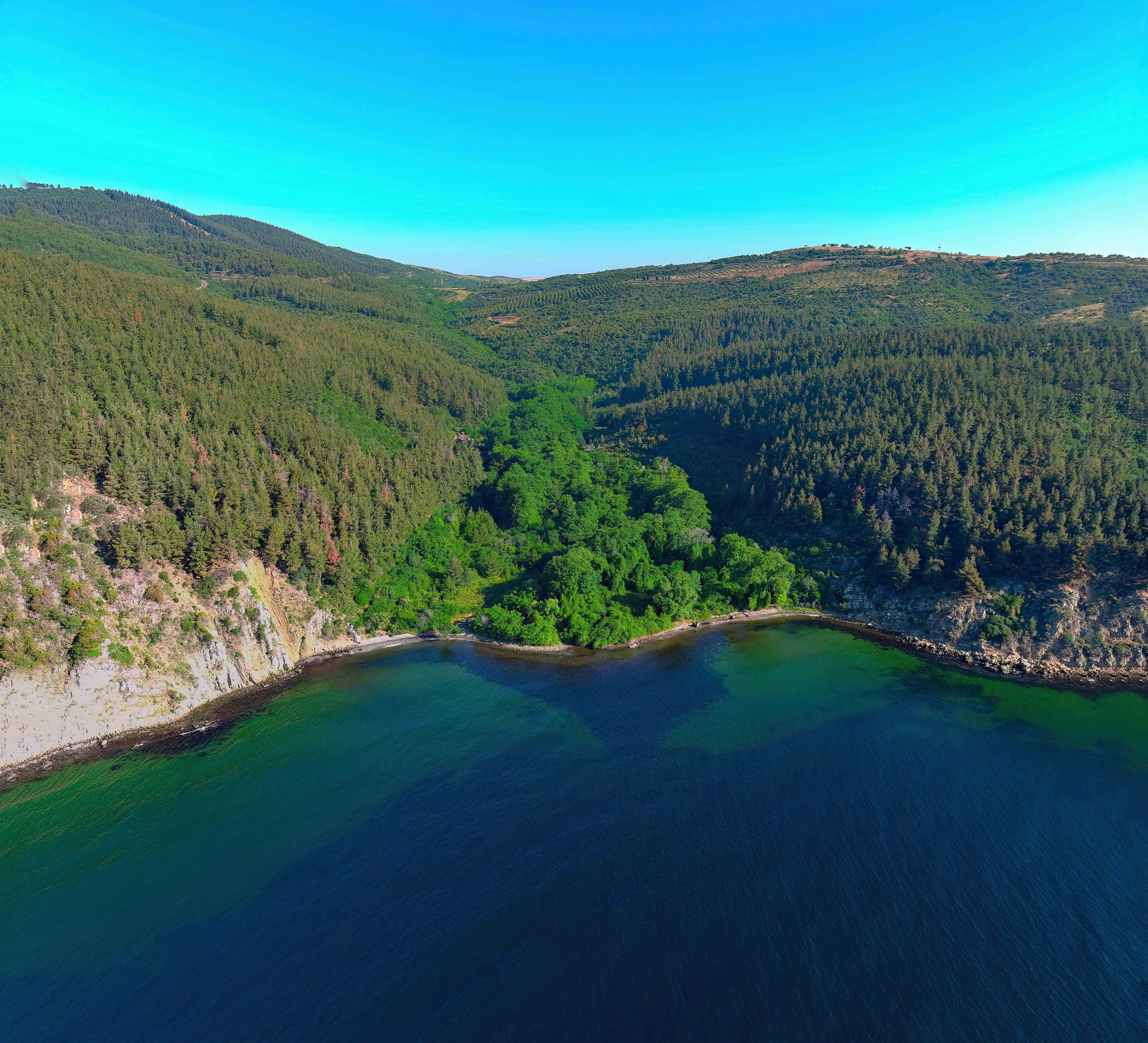
- Dut harbour Bay

- Logo

- Location of the province within Turkey
- Coordinates: 41°05′11″N 27°21′28″E
- Country: Turkey
- Seat: Tekirdağ

Government
  - Mayor: Dr. Candan Yüceer (CHP)
  - Vali: Recep Soytürk
- Area: 6,190 km^{2} (2,390 sq mi)
- Population (2025): 1,208,441
  - Density: 195/km^{2} (506/sq mi)
- Time zone: UTC+3 (TRT)
- Area code: 0282
- ISO 3166 code: TR-59
- Website: www.tekirdag.bel.tr www.tekirdag.gov.tr

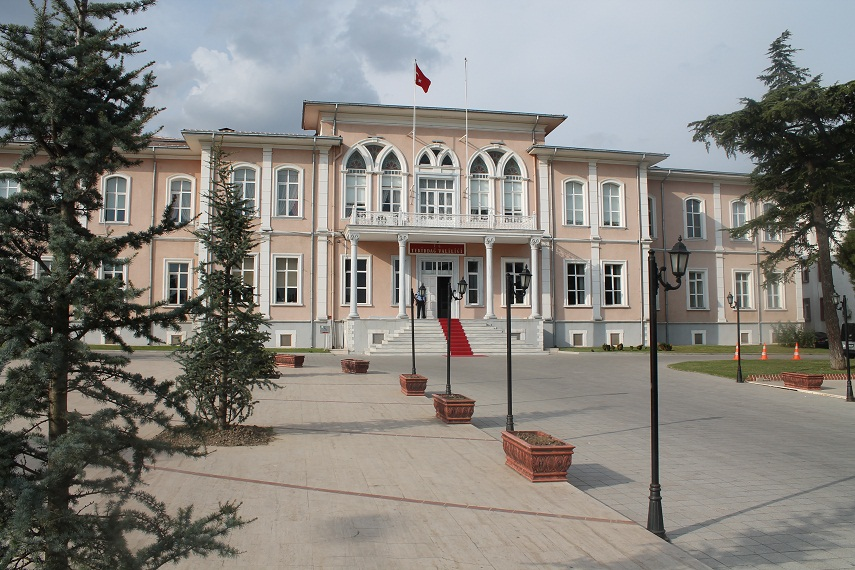
Tekirdağ Governorship

Tekirdağ Province (Turkish: Tekirdağ ili, pronounced [teˈciɾdaː]) is a province and metropolitan municipality of Turkey. Its area is 6,190 km^{2}, and its population is 1,142,451 (2022). It is located in the East Thrace region of the country, also known as European Turkey, one of only three provinces entirely within continental Europe. Tekirdağ Province is bordered by Istanbul Province to the east, Kırklareli Province to the north, Edirne Province to the west, and the Gallipoli peninsula of Çanakkale Province to the south. Tekirdağ is the capital of the province, and the third largest city in European Turkey after Istanbul and Çorlu.

== Geography ==
=== Districts ===
Districts of Tekirdağ Province

- Çerkezköy
- Çorlu
- Ergene
- Hayrabolu
- Kapaklı
- Malkara
- Marmara Ereğlisi
- Muratlı
- Saray
- Şarköy
- Süleymanpaşa

== Economy ==
=== Agriculture ===
The province of Tekirdağ is one of Turkey's the most important regions for viticulture and winemaking. The coastline between Tekirdağ and Şarköy, particularly Mürefte, are notable centers of wineyards. Twenty-two of the 27 villages of Şarköy grow grape and produce wine. There are well-known wine producers in the region, including "Doluca", "Gülor", "Kutman", "Bağcı" and "Latif Aral". Other wine producers of the region are "Melen" in Hoşköy and "Umurbey" in Tekirdağ.

== Places of interest ==
- Şahinköy Church
