= List of populated places in Tekirdağ Province =

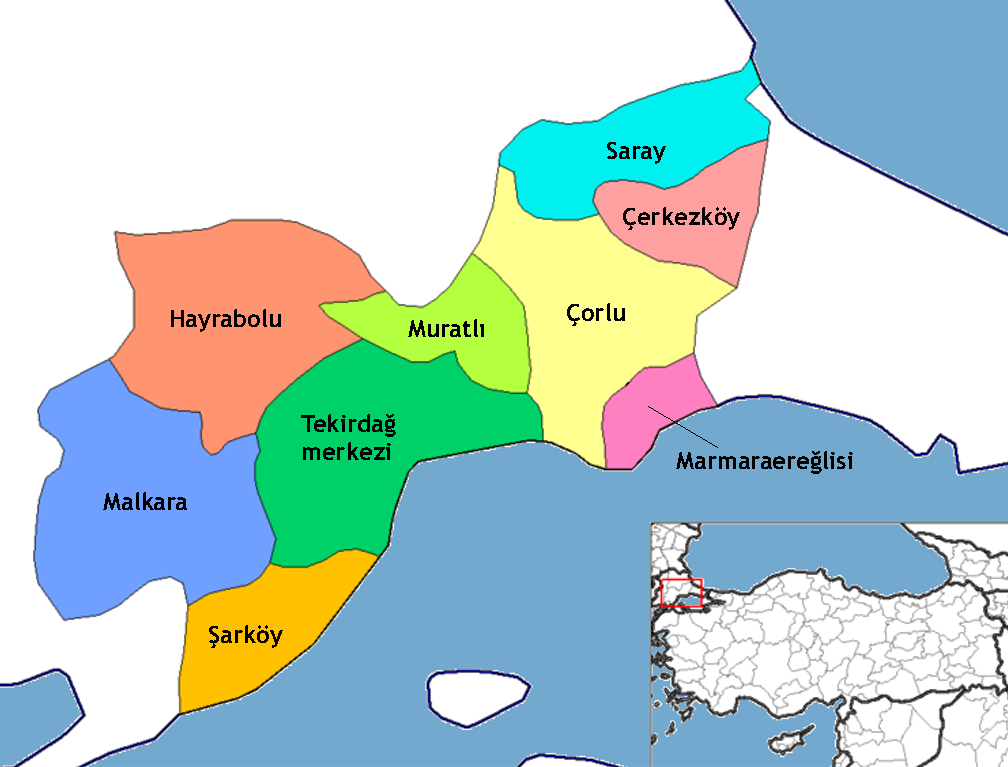
Tekirdağ Province

Below is the list of populated places in Tekirdağ Province, Turkey by the districts. In the following lists first place in each list is the administrative center of the district.

== Süleymanpaşa ==
- Süleymanpaşa
- Ahmedikli, Süleymanpaşa
- Ahmetçe, Süleymanpaşa
- Akçahalil, Süleymanpaşa
- Araphacı, Süleymanpaşa
- Aşağıkılıçlı, Süleymanpaşa
- Avşar, Süleymanpaşa
- Banarlı, Süleymanpaşa
- Barbaros, Süleymanpaşa
- Bıyıkali, Süleymanpaşa
- Çanakçı, Süleymanpaşa
- Dedecik, Süleymanpaşa
- Demirli, Süleymanpaşa
- Doğrukaracamurat, Süleymanpaşa
- Evciler, Süleymanpaşa
- Ferhadanlı, Süleymanpaşa
- Gazioğlu, Süleymanpaşa
- Generli, Süleymanpaşa
- Gündüzlü, Süleymanpaşa
- Güveçli, Süleymanpaşa
- Hacıköy, Süleymanpaşa
- Husunlu, Süleymanpaşa
- Işıklar, Süleymanpaşa
- İnecik, Süleymanpaşa
- Karabezirgan, Süleymanpaşa
- Karacakılavuz, Süleymanpaşa
- Karaçalı, Süleymanpaşa
- Karaevli, Süleymanpaşa
- Karahalil, Süleymanpaşa
- Karahisarlı, Süleymanpaşa
- Karansıllı, Süleymanpaşa
- Kaşıkçı, Süleymanpaşa
- Kayı, Süleymanpaşa
- Kazandere, Süleymanpaşa
- Kılavuzlu, Süleymanpaşa
- Kınıklar, Süleymanpaşa
- Köseilyas, Süleymanpaşa
- Kumbağ, Süleymanpaşa
- Mahramlı, Süleymanpaşa
- Naipköy, Süleymanpaşa
- Nusratfakı, Süleymanpaşa
- Nusratlı, Süleymanpaşa
- Oğuzlu, Süleymanpaşa
- Ormanlı, Süleymanpaşa
- Ortaca, Süleymanpaşa
- Oruçbeyli, Süleymanpaşa
- Osmanlı, Süleymanpaşa
- Otmanlı, Süleymanpaşa
- Selçuk, Süleymanpaşa
- Semetli, Süleymanpaşa
- Seymenli, Süleymanpaşa
- Taşumurca, Süleymanpaşa
- Tatarlı, Süleymanpaşa
- Yağcı, Süleymanpaşa
- Yayabaşı, Süleymanpaşa
- Yazır, Süleymanpaşa
- Yenice, Süleymanpaşa
- Yeniköy, Süleymanpaşa
- Yukarıkılıçlı, Süleymanpaşa
- Yuva, Süleymanpaşa

== Çerkezköy ==
- Çerkezköy
- Kızılpınar, Çerkezköy
- Veliköy, Çerkezköy

== Çorlu ==
- Çorlu
- Ahimehmet, Çorlu
- Bakırca, Çorlu
- Deregündüzlü, Çorlu
- Esenler, Çorlu
- İğneler, Çorlu
- Karamehmet, Çorlu
- Kırkgöz, Çorlu
- Maksutlu, Çorlu
- Marmaracık, Çorlu
- Misinli, Çorlu
- Önerler, Çorlu
- Paşaköy, Çorlu
- Pınarbaşı, Çorlu
- Sarılar, Çorlu
- Seymen, Çorlu
- Şahpaz, Çorlu
- Türkgücü, Çorlu
- Ulaş, Çorlu
- Vakıflar, Çorlu
- Velimeşe, Çorlu
- Yenice, Çorlu
- Yulaflı, Çorlu

== Ergene ==
- Ergene

== Hayrabolu ==
- Hayrabolu
- Ataköy, Hayrabolu
- Avluobası, Hayrabolu
- Aydınlar, Hayrabolu
- Bayramşah, Hayrabolu
- Buzağcı, Hayrabolu
- Büyükkarakarlı, Hayrabolu
- Cambazdere, Hayrabolu
- Canhıdır, Hayrabolu
- Çene, Hayrabolu
- Çerkezmüsellim, Hayrabolu
- Çıkrıkçı, Hayrabolu
- Dambaslar, Hayrabolu
- Danişment, Hayrabolu
- Delibedir, Hayrabolu
- Duğcalı, Hayrabolu
- Emiryakup, Hayrabolu
- Fahrioğlu, Hayrabolu
- Hacıllı, Hayrabolu
- Hasköy, Hayrabolu
- Hedeyli, Hayrabolu
- İsmailli, Hayrabolu
- Kabahöyük, Hayrabolu
- Kadriye, Hayrabolu
- Kandamış, Hayrabolu
- Karababa, Hayrabolu
- Karabürçek, Hayrabolu
- Karakavak, Hayrabolu
- Karayahşi, Hayrabolu
- Kemallar, Hayrabolu
- Kılıçlar, Hayrabolu
- Kurtdere, Hayrabolu
- Kutlugün, Hayrabolu
- Küçükkarakarlı, Hayrabolu
- Lahna, Hayrabolu
- Muzruplu, Hayrabolu
- Örey, Hayrabolu
- Övenler, Hayrabolu
- Parmaksız, Hayrabolu
- Soylu, Hayrabolu
- Subaşı, Hayrabolu
- Susuzmüsellim, Hayrabolu
- Şalgamlı, Hayrabolu
- Tatarlı, Hayrabolu
- Temrezli, Hayrabolu
- Umurbey, Hayrabolu
- Umurçu, Hayrabolu
- Yörgüç, Hayrabolu
- Yörükler, Hayrabolu

== Kapaklı ==
- Kapaklı
- Bahçeağıl, Kapaklı
- Karaağaç, Kapaklı
- Karlı, Kapaklı
- Pınarca, Kapaklı
- Uzunhacı, Kapaklı
- Yanıkağıl, Kapaklı

== Malkara ==
- Malkara
- Ahievren, Malkara
- Ahmetpaşa, Malkara
- Aksakal, Malkara
- Alaybey, Malkara
- Allıışık, Malkara
- Bağpınarı, Malkara
- Balabancık, Malkara
- Ballı, Malkara
- Ballısüle, Malkara
- Batkın, Malkara
- Bayramtepe, Malkara
- Çavuşköy, Malkara
- Çınaraltı, Malkara
- Çınarlıdere, Malkara
- Çimendere, Malkara
- Danişment, Malkara
- Davuteli, Malkara
- Deliller, Malkara
- Demircili, Malkara
- Dereköy, Malkara
- Deveci, Malkara
- Develi, Malkara
- Doğanköy, Malkara
- Dolu, Malkara
- Elmalı, Malkara
- Emirali, Malkara
- Esendik, Malkara
- Evrenbey, Malkara
- Gönence, Malkara
- Gözsüz, Malkara
- Güneşli, Malkara
- Hacısungur, Malkara
- Halıç, Malkara
- Hasköy, Malkara
- Hemit, Malkara
- Hereke, Malkara
- Izgar, Malkara
- İbribey, Malkara
- İbrice, Malkara
- İshakça, Malkara
- Kadıköy, Malkara
- Kalaycı, Malkara
- Karacagür, Malkara
- Karacahalil, Malkara
- Karaiğdemir, Malkara
- Karamurat, Malkara
- Kavakçeşme, Malkara
- Kermeyan, Malkara
- Kırıkali, Malkara
- Kiremitlik, Malkara
- Kozyörük, Malkara
- Kuyucu, Malkara
- Küçükhıdır, Malkara
- Kürtüllü, Malkara
- Mestanlar, Malkara
- Müstecep, Malkara
- Pirinççeşme, Malkara
- Sağlamtaş, Malkara
- Sarıpolat, Malkara
- Sarıyar, Malkara
- Sarnıç, Malkara
- Sırtbey, Malkara
- Şahin, Malkara
- Tekkeköy, Malkara
- Teteköy, Malkara
- Vakıfiğdemir, Malkara
- Yaylagöne, Malkara
- Yaylaköy, Malkara
- Yenice, Malkara
- Yenidibek, Malkara
- Yılanlı, Malkara
- Yörücek, Malkara
- Yürük, Malkara

== Marmaraereğlisi ==
- Marmara Ereğlisi
- Çeşmeli, Marmaraereğlisi
- Sultanköy, Marmaraereğlisi
- Türkmenli, Marmaraereğlisi
- Yakuplu, Marmaraereğlisi
- Yeniçiftlik, Marmaraereğlisi

== Muratlı ==
- Muratlı
- Arzulu, Muratlı
- Aşağısevindikli, Muratlı
- Aydınköy, Muratlı
- Balabanlı, Muratlı
- Ballıhoca, Muratlı
- Çevrimkaya, Muratlı
- Hanoğlu, Muratlı
- İnanlı, Muratlı
- Kepenekli, Muratlı
- Kırkkepenekli, Muratlı
- Müsellim, Muratlı
- Yavaşça, Muratlı
- Yeşilsırt, Muratlı
- Yukarısevindikli, Muratlı
- Yukarısırt, Muratlı
- Yurtbekler, Muratlı

== Saray ==
- Saray
- Ayvacık, Saray
- Bahçedere, Saray
- Bahçeköy, Saray
- Beyazköy, Saray
- Büyükyoncalı, Saray
- Çayla, Saray
- Çukuryurt, Saray
- Demirler, Saray
- Edirköy, Saray
- Göçerler, Saray
- Güngörmez, Saray
- Kadıköy, Saray
- Karabürçek, Saray
- Kavacık, Saray
- Kurtdere, Saray
- Küçükyoncalı, Saray
- Osmanlı, Saray
- Sefaalan, Saray
- Sinanlı, Saray
- Sofular, Saray
- Yuvalı, Saray

== Şarköy ==
- Şarköy
- Aşağıkalamış, Şarköy
- Beyoğlu, Şarköy
- Bulgur, Şarköy
- Çengelli, Şarköy
- Çınarlı, Şarköy
- Eriklice, Şarköy
- Gaziköy, Şarköy
- Gölcük, Şarköy
- Güzelköy, Şarköy
- Hoşköy, Şarköy
- İğdebağları, Şarköy
- İshaklı, Şarköy
- Kızılcaterzi, Şarköy
- Kirazlı, Şarköy
- Kocaali, Şarköy
- Mursallı, Şarköy
- Mürefte, Şarköy
- Palamut, Şarköy
- Sofuköy, Şarköy
- Şenköy, Şarköy
- Tepeköy, Şarköy
- Uçmakdere, Şarköy
- Ulaman, Şarköy
- Yayaağaç, Şarköy
- Yayaköy, Şarköy
- Yeniköy, Şarköy
- Yörgüç, Şarköy
- Yukarıkalamış, Şarköy

== Recent development ==
According to Law act no 6360, all Turkish provinces with a population more than 750 000, were renamed as metropolitan municipality. Furthermore, two new disreicts were established; Kapaklı and Ergene. All districts in those provinces became second level municipalities and all villages in those districts were renamed as a neighborhoods . Thus the villages listed above are officially neighborhoods of Tekirdağ.
