= Diocese of Chariopolis =

Orthodox and Catholic see

Chariopolis or Charioupolis (Greek: Χαριούπολις), modern Hayrabolu in European Turkey, was a residential bishopric of the Patriarchate of Constantinople during the Byzantine Empire (8th–14th centuries). Only a few of its bishops are known. After the Ottoman conquest in the 1350s, it became a titular see and disappeared entirely in the 15th century.

The Roman Catholic Church established it as a titular see in the 18th century, and continued awarding it until the 20th century.

== Residential Orthodox see ==
Chariopolis is first mentioned with the presence of Theophylact, Bishop of Chariopolis (ἐπίσκοπος Χαριουπόλεως), at the Second Council of Nicaea in 787, and of Bishop Kosmas at the Fourth Council of Constantinople in 879.

However, it only appears in the Notitiae Episcopatuum of the Patriarchate of Constantinople in the early 10th century, as a suffragan the metropolitan see of Heraclea.

In the 11th century, a bishop Michael is known through his seal; from the decoration it appears that he may have previously been a member of the clergy of the Hagia Sophia in Constantinople. In 1305 or 1306, an unnamed bishop of Chariopolis attended a synod called by Patriarch Athanasius I of Constantinople to condemn John Drimys. In 1347, the subordination of the bishopric of Chariopolis, which apparently had been vacant since the start of the Byzantine civil war of 1341–1347, to Heraclea was formally renewed by imperial prostagma. In 1351, the local bishop, whose name is not recorded, participated in a synod against Barlaam of Calabria under Patriarch Callistus I of Constantinople.

Chariopolis was conquered by the Ottoman prince Süleyman Pasha sometime between 1354 and 1362. As a result of the Ottoman conquest, by the end of the 14th century, the bishopric became a titular see, and vanishes completely in the 15th century.

== Titular Orthodox see ==
Since the 19th century, the title of Bishop of Chariopolis has been assigned to vicar bishops of the Patriarchate of Constantinople:

- Dorotheos (Prasinos) (December 3, 1855 - January 11, 1862)
- Gennadios (Sotiriadis) (October 1, 1867 - November 26, 1894)
- Germanos (Karavangelis) (25 February 1896 - 21 October 1900)
- Philotheos (Michaelidis) (February 15, 1903 - March 11, 1908)
- Kostantinos (Asimiadis) (6 April 1908 — 10 January 1912)
- Gennadios (Zasiadis) (11 April 1926 — 25 July 1939)
- Emilian (Lalousis) (November 6, 1960 — August 27, 1992)
- John (Renneteau) (March 15, 2015 - August 30, 2019)
- Bartholomew (Anastasiadis) (since November 21, 2021)

== Titular Catholic see ==
The Roman Catholic Church established "Chariopolis" (until 1925 "Cariopolis", in Italian: Cariopoli), as an episcopal titular see in the early 18th century, and still lists it as a titular see. The see has had eight incumbents:

- Bishop Silvester Jenks (1713.09.20 – 1714.12)
- Bishop Jan Chryzostom Kaczkowski (1781.06.25 – 1816.02.24)
- Bishop Raffaele Serena (1837.10.02 – 1858)
- Bishop Abraham Agabio Bsciai (1866.02.27 – 1887.02.20)
- Bishop Francesco Giampaolo (1888.06.01 – 1898.12.08)
- Bishop Joachim-Pierre Buléon, C.S.Sp. (1899.06.06 – 1900.06.13)
- Bishop Claude-Marie Chanrion, S.M. (1905.09.01 – 1941.10.17)
- Bishop Timoteo Giorgio Raymundos, O.F.M. Cap. (1945.05.04 – 1970.09.11)

== Sources ==
- Janin, Raymond (1959). "La hiérarchie ecclésiastique dans le diocèse de Thrace". Revue des études byzantines (in French). 17: 136–149. doi:10.3406/rebyz.1959.1202.
- Külzer, Andreas (2008). Tabula Imperii Byzantini, Band 12: Ostthrakien (Eurōpē) (in German). Vienna: Verlag der Österreichischen Akademie der Wissenschaften. ISBN 978-3-7001-3945-4.
