= Hayrabolu =

- District and municipality
- Logo

- Map showing Hayrabolu District in Tekirdağ Province

- Location within Turkey Location within Marmara
- Coordinates: 41°12′47″N 27°06′00″E
- Country: Turkey
- Province: Tekirdağ

Government
  - Mayor: Tuncer Başoğlu (Independent)
- Area: 1,009 km^{2} (390 sq mi)
- Elevation: 81 m (266 ft)
- Population (2022): 30,521
  - Density: 30.25/km^{2} (78.34/sq mi)
- Time zone: UTC+3 (TRT)
- Postal code: 59400
- Area code: 0282
- Website: www.hayrabolu.bel.tr

Hayrabolu is a municipality and district of Tekirdağ Province, Turkey. Its area is 1,009 km^{2}, and its population is 30,521 (2022).

== History ==
=== Byzantine period ===
Nothing is known about this city during antiquity. Chariopolis is first mentioned with the presence of Theophylact, Bishop of Chariopolis (ἐπίσκοπος Χαριουπόλεως), at the Second Council of Nicaea in 787, and of Bishop Kosmas at the Fourth Council of Constantinople in 879. Nevertheless, it first appears in the Notitiae Episcopatuum of the Patriarchate of Constantinople only in the early 10th century, as a suffragan the metropolitan see of Heraclea. Byzantine emperor and founder of the Macedonian dynasty, Basil I, was born to a peasant family in Chariopolis, possibly in 811.

In the 11th century, a bishop Michael is known through his seal; from the decoration it appears that he may have previously been a member of the clergy of the Hagia Sophia in Constantinople. The town is mentioned in the later 11th century as the site of military operations against invading nomadic tribes: the general Nikephoros Bryennios campaigned against the Pechenegs in 1051; in 1087 the town itself was sacked by a host of Pechenegs, Cumans, and Magyars; and in 1090 the Pechenegs defeated a Byzantine force in its vicinity.

On 15/16 April 1205 Geoffrey of Villehardouin spent the night there, after the disastrous Battle of Adrianople. In the aftermath of the battle, Chariopolis and other nearby towns were conquered by the Bulgarians under Tsar Kaloyan; a large part of the population was forcibly deported and resettled along the Danube.

In 1305 or 1306, an unnamed bishop of Chariopolis attended a synod called by Patriarch Athanasius I of Constantinople to condemn John Drimys. A priest named Garianos settled in the town shortly after, fleeing from the Bogomils in northern Thrace. In 1316 he was himself accused of Bogomilism, but was acquitted by a synod under Patriarch John XIII of Constantinople. In 1322, Emperor Andronikos III Palaiologos led his army to the town, where he dismissed up to a thousand of his men. In 1344, Emperor John VI Kantakouzenos briefly took up residence in the town. In 1347, the subordination of the bishopric of Chariopolis to Heraclea was formally renewed by imperial prostagma. In December 1349, Kantakouzenos awarded a metochion in the town to the Vatopedi Monastery on Mount Athos. In 1351, the local bishop, whose name is not recorded, participated in a synod against Barlaam of Calabria under Patriarch Callistus I of Constantinople.

=== Ottoman period ===
In the later 1350s, the Ottoman expansion into Thrace began, under the prince Süleyman Pasha. After Kantakouzenos' abdication in 1354, Süleyman conquered many cities "up to Chariopolis", establishing the first Ottoman province on European soil. If Chariopolis was not conquered in this first wave, then it definitely fell to Süleyman between 1359 and 1362. As a result of the Ottoman conquest, by the end of the 14th century, the bishopric became a titular see, and vanishes completely in the 15th century. The Catholic Church still lists Chariopolis as a titular see, with eight incumbents between 1713 and 1970.

The traveller Evliya Çelebi visited the town in the mid-17th century, describing it as prosperous, a "little Edirne", Orestias or Adrianopolis with much water and beautiful gardens. According to Evliya it was a favoured residence of Ottoman aristocrats. He also reports that the town was a centre of extensive animal husbandry, with large flocks, including camels.

A Greek community, 3,476 strong in 1922, survived in the town until the Greco-Turkish population exchange.

=== Modern period ===
Today Hayrabolu is a small market town serving the countryside around it.

== Monuments ==
No Byzantine-era structures survive, but in the early 20th century a local church, dedicated to St. Basil, may have been built on the site of a Byzantine predecessor, and a Byzantine capital was incorporated into the Local Pasha Mosque. At the entrance to the settlement is a 16th-century Ottoman bridge.

== Composition ==
There are 52 neighbourhoods in Hayrabolu District:

- Ataköy
- Avluobası
- Aydınevler
- Aydınlar
- Bayramşah
- Büyükkarakarlı
- Buzağcı
- Cambazdere
- Canhıdır
- Çeneköy
- Çerkezmüsellim
- Çıkrıkçı
- Dambaslar
- Danişment
- Delibedir
- Emiryakup
- Fahrioğlu
- Hacılı
- Hasköy
- Hedeyli
- Hisar
- İlyas
- İsmailli
- Kabahöyük
- Kadriye
- Kahya
- Kandamış
- Karababa
- Karabürçek
- Karakavak
- Karayahşi
- Kemaller
- Kılıçlar
- Küçükkarakarlı
- Kurtdere
- Kutlugün
- Lahana
- Muzruplu
- Öreyköy
- Övenler
- Parmaksız
- Şalgamlı
- Soylu
- Subaşı
- Susuzmüsellim
- Tatarlı
- Temrezli
- Tuğcalı
- Umurbey
- Umurcu
- Yörgüç
- Yörükler

== Sources ==
- Külzer, Andreas (2008). Tabula Imperii Byzantini: Band 12, Ostthrakien (Eurōpē) (in German). Vienna: Österreichische Akademie der Wissenschaften. ISBN 978-3-7001-3945-4.
