= Kutman Wine Museum =

- Kutman Şarap Müzesi
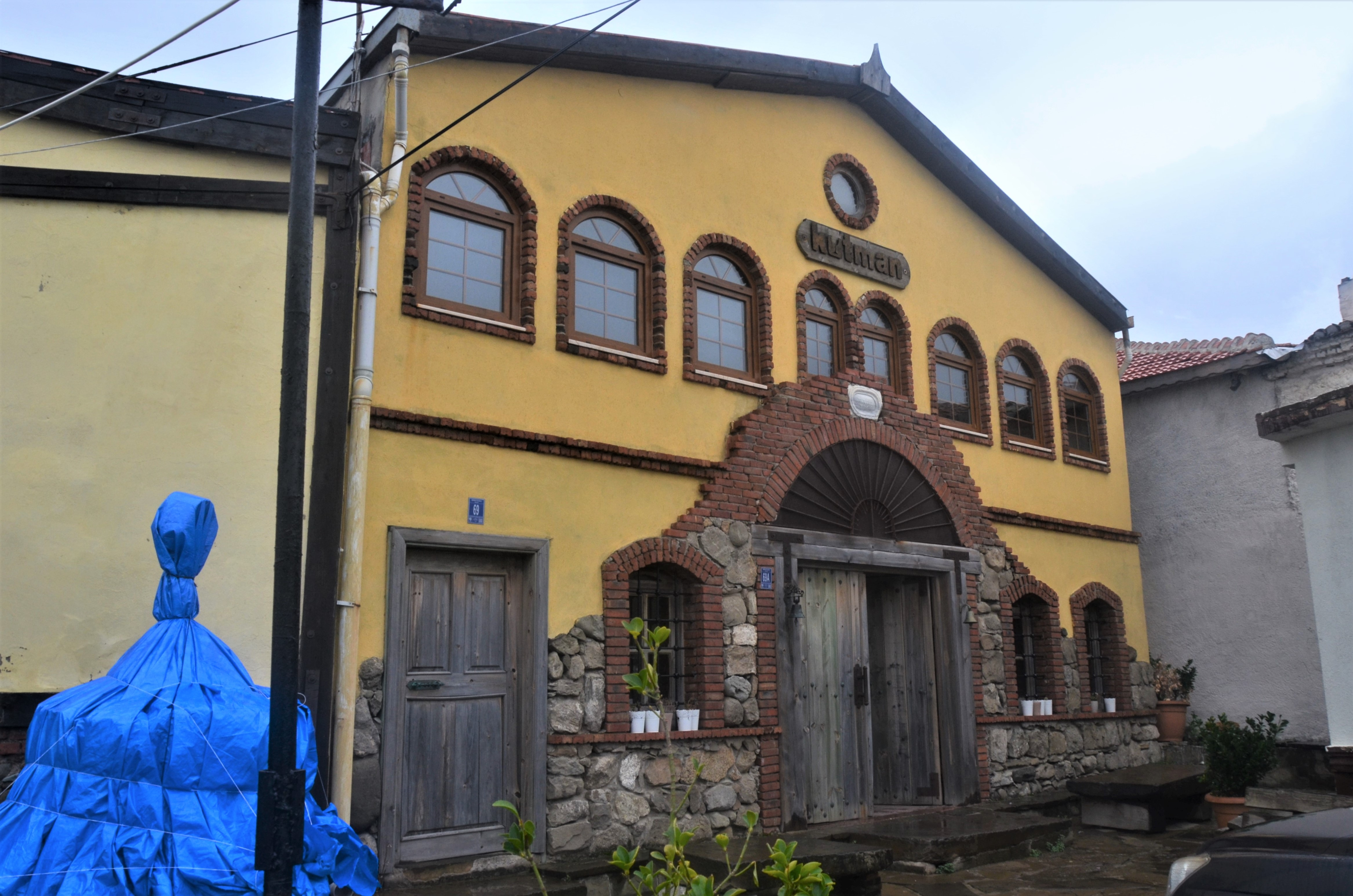
- Kutman Wine Museum

- Location of the museum in Turkey's Marmara region.
- Established: 2004; 22 years ago
- Location: Mürefte, Şarköy, Tekirdağ Province, Turkey
- Coordinates: 40°39′58″N 27°14′42″E
- Type: Wine museum
- Collections: Old mechanical winemaking devices and machinery, wooden wine barrels and old wine bottles
- Founder: Kutman Winery

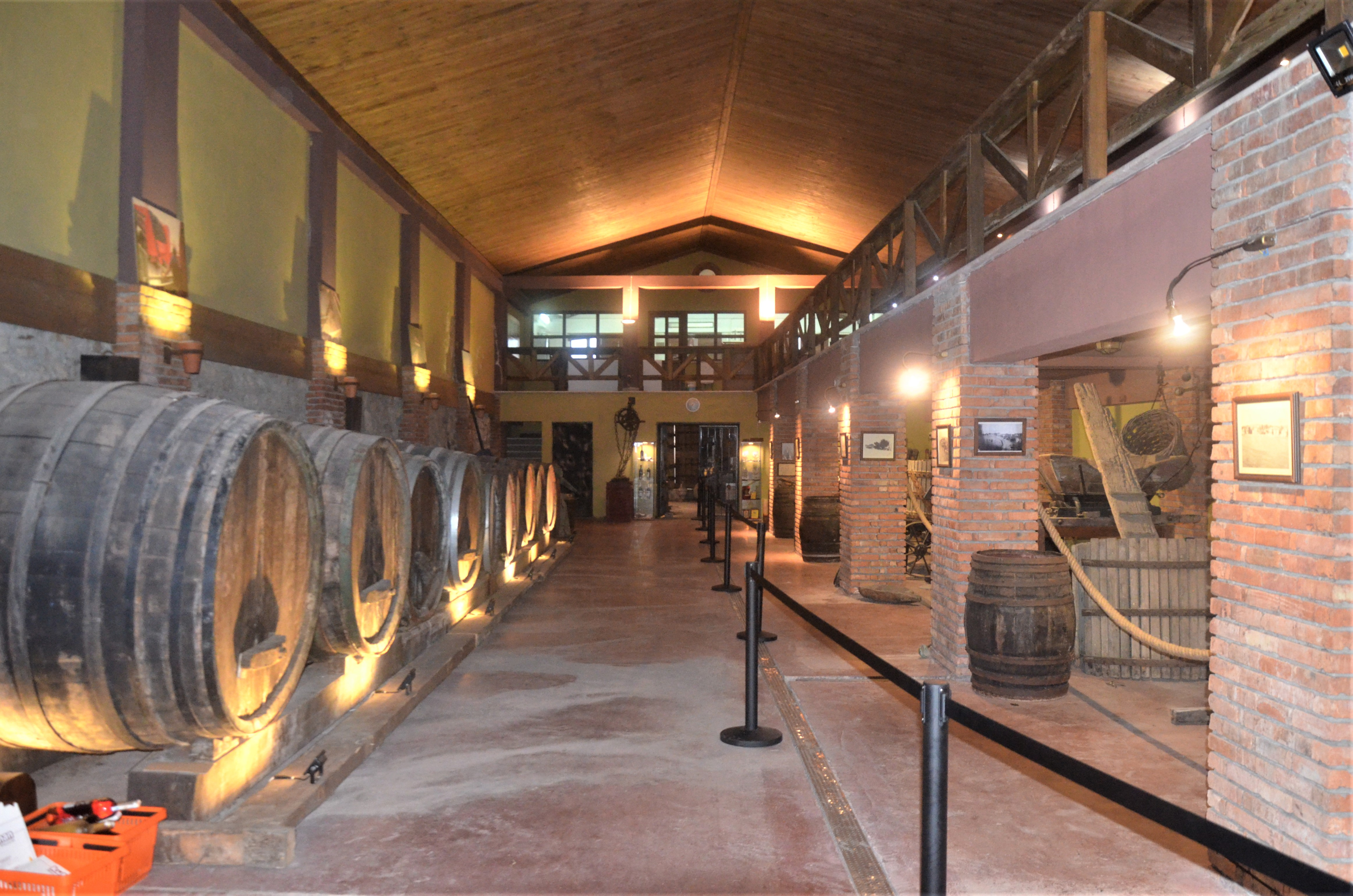
A view from the interior of Kutman Wine Museum

Kutman Wine Museum (Turkish: Kutman Şarap Müzesi) is a privately held museum devoted to winemaking, which was established in 2004 by the Kutman Winery at Mürefte, Şarköy of Tekirdağ Province, Turkey.

Kutman Wine Museum was founded in 2004 by the third-generation executives Adnan and Cahit Kutman of the Kutman Winery, which is one of the five wineries in Mürefte village of Şarköy, Tekirdağ. It is housed in a building next to the residence, where the family had lived between the early 1900s and 1976. The museum exhibits singed joists of the 1928-burnt old residence building, wine production records of the last eighty years, weighing scales from the Ottoman period, mechanical crusher, mechanical destemming machine, must pump, big wooden wine barrels, bottle corking machine and dusty wine bottles.
