= Georgios Vizyinos =

Greek writer and poet (1849–1896)

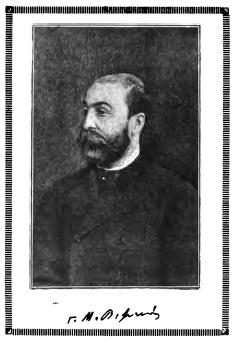
- Born: Georges Syrmas; March 8, 1849; Vize, Ottoman Empire
- Died: April 14, 1896 (aged 47); Psychiatric Hospital Dromokaition, Athens, Greece

Georgios Vizyinos (Greek: Γεώργιος Βιζυηνός [viziiˈnos]; born as "Georges Syrmas"; March 8, 1849, Vize – April 15, 1896, Athens) was a Greek short story writer and poet. His poems, which are considered influential in Greek literature, focus on ethnography and he was referred to as a "painter of souls". Most of his writings are self-narrative and self-investigative in nature.

After a rough childhood and unsuccessful attempts to marry a 14-year old student while he was in his 40s, Vizyinos tried to commit suicide and was admitted to a mental institution, where he died in 1896 at age 47, likely from syphilis.

== Biography ==
Vizyinos was born as Georges Syrmas in Vize, to the north-west of Constantinople. He was one of five children from a destitute family. His father, Michael Syrmas, worked in lime kilns and died of typhus when Vizyinos was five years old; two of his sisters died in early childhood, including Anna, who died from accidental suffocation by her mother, and one of his brothers, who died in mysterious circumstances.

In 1860, at age 10, he was sent to Constantinople to live with his uncle and learn tailoring. When he was 18, as a protégé of the Archbishop of Cyprus, Sophronios II, he moved to Cyprus. In 1872, he was admitted to the Halki seminary on the island of Halki, where he studied religion and literature under poet Ilias Tantalidis.

He was introduced to George Zarifis, who funded his studies of philology in Athens; in 1874 and 1875, he studied at the Athens School of Philosophy. He was awarded a doctorate in Leipzig, Germany, where he studied under Wilhelm Wundt. In 1881, he completed his dissertation paper, titled "The Relation of Psychology and Pedagogy with the Children’s Play". He returned to Athens, where he was met with disbelief and ridicule by literary circles. He moved to Paris in 1882 and then London, where he mingled with Greek authors and changed his focus from poems to short stories.

After Zarifis died in 1884, Vizyinos had to earn a living on his own. He became a secondary school teacher and, from 1890, a professor of rhythmics and drama at the Athens Conservatoire. There, he fell in love with a 14-year old student, Bettina Fravasili, but his love was unrequited. After proposing to her, he was rejected by the student's mother, which was said to have triggered his mental illness.

In 1892, Vizyinos was in such a state of delusion that he dressed up and prepared for a wedding. When it did not happen, he tried to commit suicide - he was saved by a friend.

Vizyinos was admitted to the psychiatric hospital Dromokaition in Athens in April 1892.

He died there four years later in 1896, aged 47, desolate, likely from syphilis. He received a public funeral with eulogies given by Aristotelis Kourtidis and Kostis Palamas. After his death, Vizyinos' mother was said to have cried so much that she went blind.

== Works ==
- To Ptochon tis Kyprou (Το πτωχόν της Κύπρου) (1867) - describes eating halloumi cheese in a village.
- Poetica Protoleia (Juvenile Poems) (1873) - won first prize in the Voutsinaios Literary Competition (1874)
- Diamanto (1875)
- Ares, Mares, Koukounares (renamed Vosporides Avra) (1876)
- Araps and his Camel (1879) - a children's story
- My Mother’s Sin (1883) - focuses on themes of forgiveness, guilt, and atonement; inspired by the accidental suffocation of his sister by his mother
- Between Piraeus and Naples (1883)
- Who was my Brother’s Murderer (1883)
- The Only Journey of His Life (1884)
- Intellectual Geniuses (1885)
- Moskov-Selim (published 1895) - published while he was institutionalized; set in Thrace, it contains ethnographic and psychobiographic elements, narrating the adventures of Moscov-Selim, a Turkish soldier who is persecuted and tantalized.
