= Tipaso =

Settlement and station (mutatio) of ancient Thrace

Coordinates: 41°14′25″N 27°41′36″E

Tipaso was a settlement and station (mutatio) of ancient Thrace which was inhabited during Byzantine times.

Its site is located northwest of Çorlu in European Turkey.
