= Kourtidis =

Kourtidis is a surname. Notable people with the surname include:

- Aristotelis Kourtidis
- Nikolaos Kourtidis
- Pavlos Kourtidis
- Efkleidis Kourtidis
