= Ilias Tantalidis =

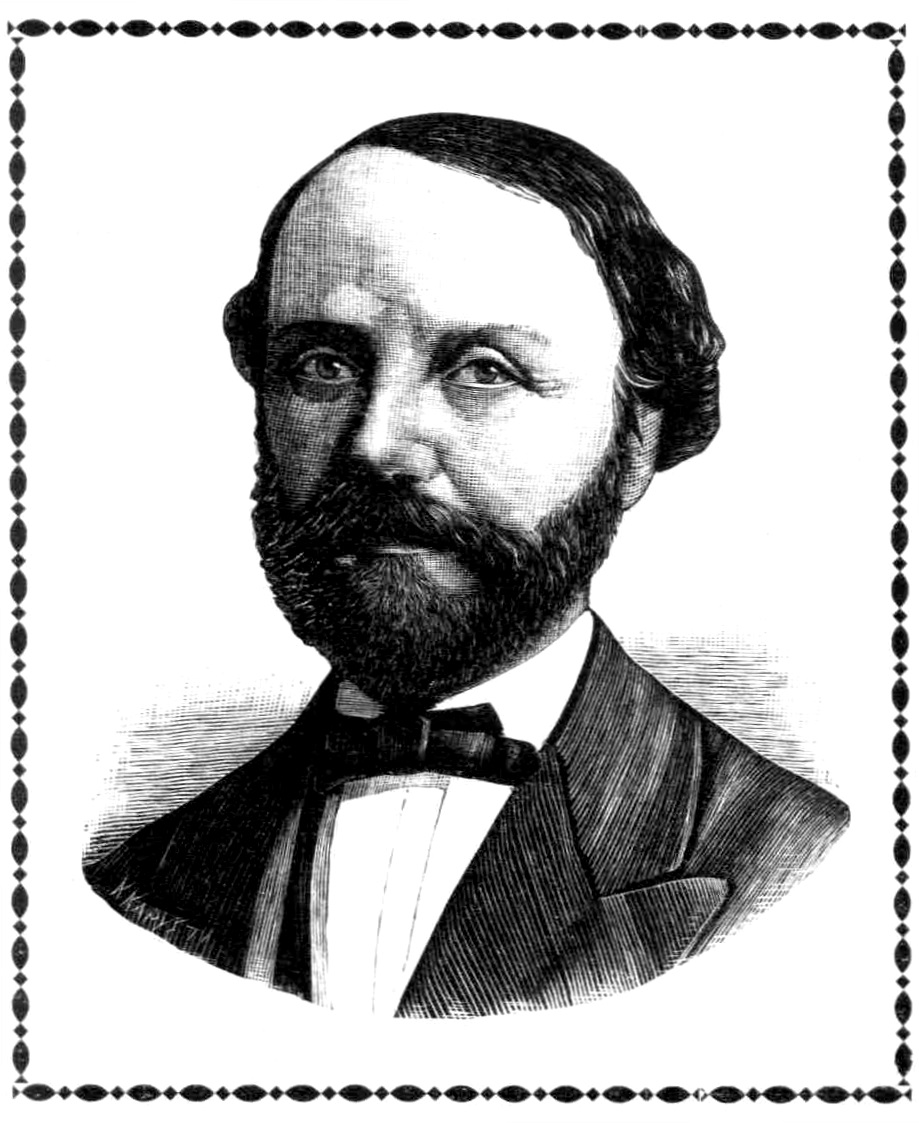
- Born: 1818; Constantinople, Ottoman Empire
- Died: 1876 (aged 57–58); Constantinople, Ottoman Empire
- Occupations: Poet, teacher
- Writing career
- Period: 19th century

Ilias Tantalidis (Greek: Ηλίας Τανταλίδης 1818–1876) was a Greek poet of the First Athenian School and an educator.

== Biography ==
He was born in Fener in 1818. His father was from Crete and their original family name was Trantalidakis. He studied in the Great School of the Nation in Kuruçeşme and in the Evangelical School of Smyrna. After finishing school he was hired by the rich Phanariot doctor and intellectual Stefanos Caratheodory as a teacher for his children. In 1840, with financial support from Caratheodory he enrolled in the Faculty of Philosophy in the University of Athens and finished in 1844. He returned to Constantinopole and was planning to publish an ecclesiastic journal but in 1845 lost his eyesight. Despite being blind, he became professor in the Halki seminary and was led by a servant to the classroom. Among his students was Georgios Vizyinos and Tantalidis became his mentor and encouraged him towards his literary career. He died in 1876 from peritonitis shortly after returning from Athens where he published his last poetry collection. He was buried behind the church of Holy Trinity in Halki.

== Literary work ==
As a poet, Tantalidis has been called the last Phanariot poet. His work is part of the romantic First Athenian School. He published his first poem when he was 16 years old and was studying in Smyrna. His first poetry collection was published in 1837 called Paignia (Games) which was dedicated to Loukia Caratheodory, and was very successful. He wrote poems both in Katharevousa and Demotic Greek. Although during his era, most poems were pompous and grandiose he managed to lower the tone and bring back the Phanariot grace and merriness. His satirical poems, especially the ones targeting Phanariot society were very successful. The poems and songs he wrote for children became quite popular and some of them were still used in textbooks for many decades after his death.

Along with his poetic work, Tantalidis was an important intellectual in the Greek community and was close to the Patriarchate. He also wrote many treatises, for topics like the Catholic Church and the schism with the Bulgarian Exarchate. For his contributions he was bestowed the title of Grand Rhetorician of the Great Church of Christ.
