= Sigillion =

Type of legal document publicly affirmed with a seal

A sigillion (Greek: σιγίλλιον, plural sigillia, σιγίλλια), was a type of legal document publicly affirmed with a seal, usually of lead.

== Origin and Byzantine usage ==
The term sigillion derives from the Latin sigillum 'seal', which quickly came to mean also the document to which the seal was affixed.

The first Byzantine sigillion is attested at the imperial chancery in 883. It was subsequently used by lower-level public officials, including tax collectors and judges, as well as by provincial governors. It is distinct from an imperial document bearing a golden seal, a chrysobull (chrysoboullon sigillion).

A distinguishing feature of the sigillion is the presence of the word sigillion in red ink. Imperial sigillia also contained the emperor's menologem. They were on the decline by the eleventh century, from which time only a few are preserved. The catepans of Italy continued to issue sigillia in the eleventh century, and this practice was continued under Norman rule. The Norman rulers followed the form of the Byzantine sigillion exactly in their Greek documents, using lead or wax seals. This began with a symbolic invocation (usually the Chrismon), followed by the ruler's intitulation and the name of the recipient and then a dating clause with the month and indiction written by the issuer's own hand, the so-called menologem. This was followed in some cases by an arenga and a narration of the events which brought about the issuing of the charter. Then came the disposition, which was the active and effective part of the document and was always written in the third person in a highly formulaic manner, followed by the sanction, which was usually a threat that any violator of the charter would feel the ruler's anger. The document ends with corroboration (witnesses), the name of the recipient a second time and a second dating clause.

In the thirteenth century, the terms sigillion and sigilliodes gramma came into use in the chancery of the Patriarchate of Constantinople. They replaced the term hypomnema for the most solemn patriarchal documents, those bearing the patriarch's full signature and usually either establishing a point of ecclesiastical law, often one passed by a synod, or granting a privilege to a diocese or monastery.

== Arabic and Ottoman usage ==
From Byzantine usage, the term was adopted in Arabic (سجل, sijill) via Aramaic, as a term for documents or scrolls. This usage is present already in the Quran. In Fatimid Egypt, the term was used for the official correspondence of the Fatimid court. In Mamluk Egypt, the term was used for judicial court registers, while in the Ottoman Empire, the term was generally applied to registers of all kinds, such as personnel files. The term is most notably applied to the court registers (kadi sijilleri or sher'iyye sijilleri).

== Sources ==
- Becker, Julia (2016) [2013]. "Charters and Chancery under Roger I and Roger II". In Stefan Burkhardt; Thomas Foerster (eds.). Norman Tradition and Transcultural Heritage: Exchange of Cultures in the 'Norman' Peripheries of Medieval Europe. Routledge. pp. 79–96.
- de Blois, F. C. (1997). "Sid̲j̲ill – 1. Ḳurʾānic and early Arabic usage". In Bosworth, C. E.; van Donzel, E.; Heinrichs, W. P. & Lecomte, G. (eds.). The Encyclopaedia of Islam, Second Edition. Volume IX: San–Sze. Leiden: E. J. Brill. p. 538. doi:10.1163/1573-3912_islam_COM_1069. ISBN 978-90-04-10422-8.
- Faroqhi, Suraiya (1997). "Sid̲j̲ill – 3. In Ottoman administrative usage". In Bosworth, C. E.; van Donzel, E.; Heinrichs, W. P. & Lecomte, G. (eds.). The Encyclopaedia of Islam, Second Edition. Volume IX: San–Sze. Leiden: E. J. Brill. pp. 539–545. doi:10.1163/1573-3912_islam_COM_1069. ISBN 978-90-04-10422-8.
- Little, D. P. (1997). "Sid̲j̲ill – 2. In Mamlūk usage". In Bosworth, C. E.; van Donzel, E.; Heinrichs, W. P. & Lecomte, G. (eds.). The Encyclopaedia of Islam, Second Edition. Volume IX: San–Sze. Leiden: E. J. Brill. pp. 538–539. doi:10.1163/1573-3912_islam_COM_1069. ISBN 978-90-04-10422-8.
- Oikonomides, Nicolas (1991). "Sigillion". In Kazhdan, Alexander (ed.). The Oxford Dictionary of Byzantium. Oxford and New York: Oxford University Press. pp. 1893–1894. ISBN 0-19-504652-8.
