= Menologem =

Dating clause in the Byzantine Empire

The menologem (Ancient Greek: μηνολόγημα, mēnológēma), menologium (Latin), or menologion (μηνολόγιον, mēnológion) was a dating clause used in certain types of official acts of the Byzantine Empire, such as the prostagma and sigillion. It recorded the month and the indiction (but not the day) and was always written by the issuer's own hand. It thus functioned as a signature. The emperor alone was allowed to write the menologem in red ink, while the Patriarch of Constantinople was permitted to use black. Until the late thirteenth century, only the senior emperor—if there was more than one bearing the title simultaneously—had the right to use red ink. In the fourteenth century, the Metropolitan of Thessalonike also used black.

The earliest use of the menologem dates from the reign of Constantine IV (654–85). It was discontinued by Manuel II in 1394, when he ordered the year of the world to be added to the date.

Under the Latin Empire of Frankokratia founded after the Fourth Crusade in 1204, a hybrid menologem was used in Latin documents. For example, on 5 August 1243 the Latin emperor Baldwin II authenticated a letter by writing a dating formula with his own hand in red ink, but he dropped the indiction and added to the day the year of the Lord, the place of signature (Constantinople), and his regnal year. Among the Byzantine successor states after 1204, the authentic red menologem of the emperors was kept alive only in the Empire of Nicaea.
