= Marmaracık =

- Neighbourhood
- Location in Turkey Marmaracık (Marmara)
- Coordinates: 41°12′25″N 27°45′11″E
- Country: Turkey
- Province: Tekirdağ
- District: Ergene
- Elevation: 155 m (509 ft)
- Population (2022): 4,167
- Time zone: UTC+3 (TRT)
- Postal code: 59930
- Area code: 0282

Marmaracık is a neighbourhood of the municipality and district of Ergene, Tekirdağ Province, Turkey. Its population is 4,167 (2022). Before the 2013 reorganisation, it was a town (belde) in the district of Çorlu. It is the centre of the district of Ergene, created in 2013.

== Geography ==
Marmaracık is situated in East Thrace, the European part of Turkey. It is on the Turkish state highway D.100 which connects Istanbul to Edirne and the Bulgarian border. The distance to Çorlu is only 4 kilometres (2.5 mi) and to Tekirdağ is 36 kilometres (22 mi).

== History ==
The population of the town is composed of Türkmen people which were settled in Dobrudja of Romania by the Ottoman Empire government during the early years of the empire. In 1920s, most of these people returned to Turkey and a part of them were settled in Marmaracık. In 1999 the settlement was declared a seat of township.

== Economy ==
Wheat and sunflower are the two main agricultural crops. Marmaracık is situated in a flourishing industrial area and there are industrial facilities and depo's around.
