= Ulaş, Tekirdağ =

Ulaş
- Neighbourhood
- Location within Turkey Location within Marmara
- Coordinates: 41°13′N 27°43′E
- Country: Turkey
- Province: Tekirdağ
- District: Ergene
- Elevation: 150 m (490 ft)
- Population (2022): 6,727
- Time zone: UTC+3 (TRT)
- Postal code: 59930
- Area code: 0282

Ulaş is a neighbourhood of the municipality and district of Ergene, Tekirdağ Province, Turkey. Its population is 6,727 (2022). Before the 2013 reorganisation, it was a town (belde) in the district of Çorlu. It is situated in the Rumeli region of the Balkan Peninsula (also known as Thrace in Turkey, the European part of Turkey) south of Turkish state highway D.535, which connects Istanbul to Edirne and the Bulgarian border. Its distance to Çorlu is 12 kilometres (7.5 mi); to Tekirdağ is 49 kilometres (30 mi).

Ulaş was founded in 1937 by Turkish refugees from Bulgaria. In 1992 it was declared the seat of its township. It is situated in a rapidly flourishing industrial area; there are about 60 factories or workshops in and around the town. Animal husbandry and agriculture are secondary economic sectors.
