= Velimeşe =

- Neighbourhood
- Flag

- Location within Turkey Location within Marmara
- Coordinates: 41°15′N 27°53′E
- Country: Turkey
- Province: Tekirdağ
- District: Ergene
- Elevation: 135 m (443 ft)
- Population: c. 20,000
- Time zone: UTC+3 (TRT)
- Postal code: 59930
- Area code: 0282

Velimeşe is a neighbourhood of the municipality and district of Ergene, Tekirdağ Province, Turkey. Its population is 11,420 (2022). Before the 2013 reorganisation, it was a town (belde) in the district of Çorlu.

== Geography ==
Velimeşe is situated in East Thrace (the European part of Turkey) to the north of Çorlu Creek (a tributary of the river Ergene) and O.3 motorway which connects Istanbul to Kapıkule at the Bulgarian border. The distance to Çorlu is 13 kilometres (8.1 mi) to Tekirdağ is 52 kilometres (32 mi) and to Istanbul is 110 kilometres (68 mi).

== History ==
In the 19th century, the town's location was occupied by a public farm used for military training. The name of the farm was Velipaşa, referring to an Ottoman pasha. After the Russo-Turkish War (1877-1878), Turkish refugees from Bulgaria and Serbia were settled on the farm, and the settlement was named Velimeşe. In the early 20th century, the settlement experienced two temporary occupations. In 1912, it was occupied by Bulgaria during the First Balkan War, but it was returned to Turkey during the Second Balkan War. Between 1920 and 1922, following the First World War, it was occupied by Greece. On 15 October 1922, Velimeşe was returned to Turkey. In 1974, the settlement was declared the seat of a township.

== Economy ==
Velimeşe is a flourishing town. Corn, sunflower and cereals are among the main crops. But the majority of town residents work in factories around the town.
