= Palamut, Tekirdağ =

Palamut
- Neighbourhood
- Location in Turkey Palamut (Marmara)
- Coordinates: 40°45′29″N 027°09′26″E
- Country: Turkey
- Province: Tekirdağ
- District: Şarköy
- Elevation: 350 m (1,150 ft)
- Population (2022): 30
- Time zone: UTC+3 (TRT)
- Postal code: 59800
- Area code: 0282

Palamut (Greek: Δρυϊνοχώρι Dryïnochṓri) is a neighbourhood of the municipality and district of Şarköy, Tekirdağ Province, Turkey. Its population is 30 (2022). It is thirty kilometres from the town of Şarköy.

The primarily occupation is as a farmer. The population of the village has been declining. In 1985 it was 113, in 1997 it was 65, and as of 2022, the population was 30.

Historical population
Year	Pop.	±% p.a.
1985	113	—
1990	93	−3.82%
1997	65	−4.99%
2007	51	−2.40%
2012	43	−3.35%
2017	46	+1.36%
2022	30	−8.19%
Source: 1985 census, 1990 census, 1997 census and TÜIK (2007-2022)
