= Hedeyli, Hayrabolu =

Hedeyli
- Neighbourhood
- Location in Turkey Hedeyli (Marmara)
- Coordinates: 41.3304°N 27.0269°E
- Country: Turkey
- Province: Tekirdağ
- District: Hayrabolu
- Elevation: 61 m (200 ft)
- Population (2022): 269
- Time zone: UTC+3 (TRT)
- Postal code: 59400
- Area code: 0282

Hedeyli is a neighbourhood of the municipality and district of Hayrabolu, Tekirdağ Province, Turkey. Its population is 269 (2022). It is situated in the eastern Trakya (Thrace) plains. The distance to Hayrabolu is 18 kilometres (11 mi). It was a Bulgarian village during the Ottoman Empire era. But after the Second Balkan War the Bulgarian population was forced to leave the settlement.
