= Ergene, Tekirdağ =

Ergene
- District and municipality
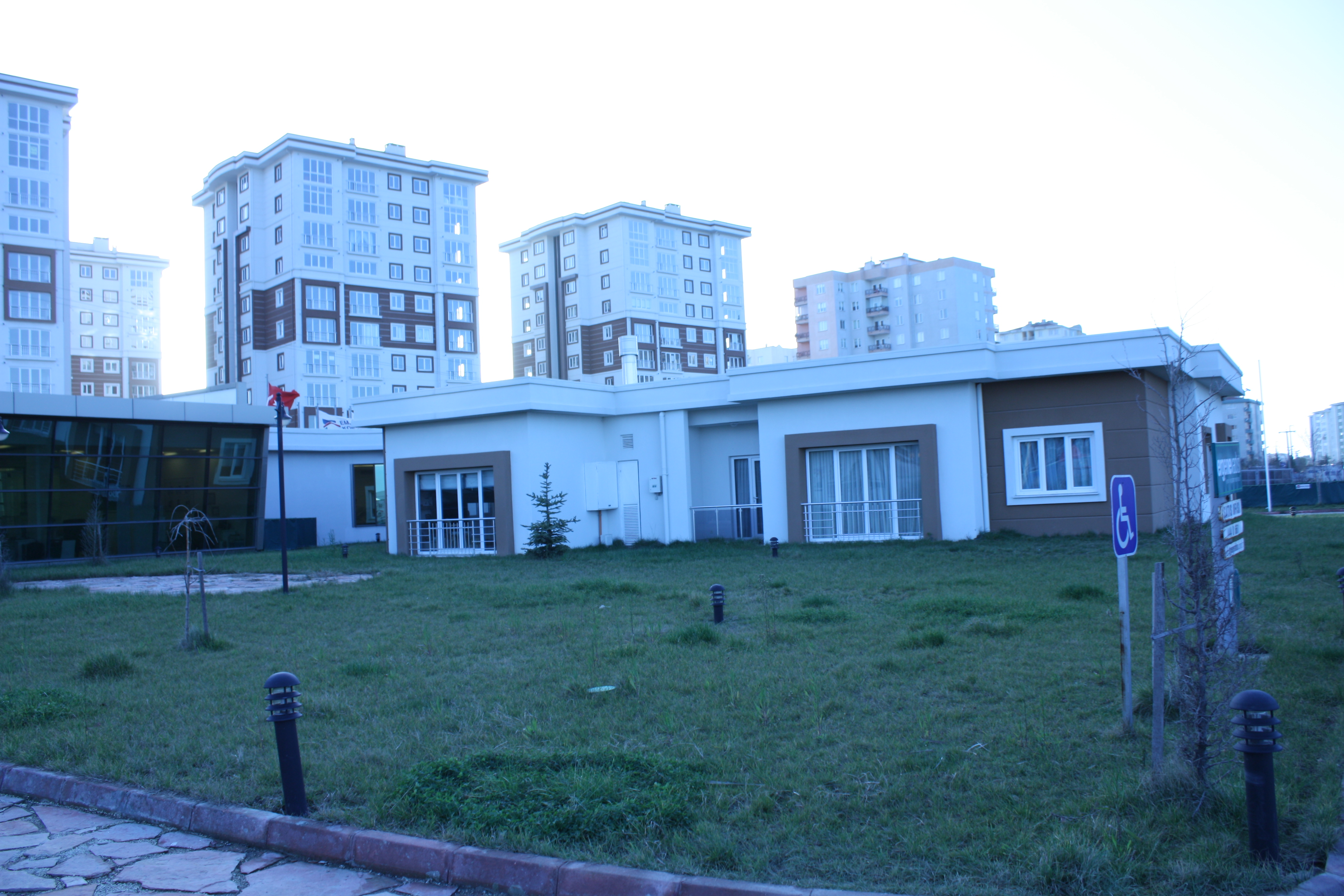

- Logo

- Map showing Ergene District in Tekirdağ Province

- Location within Turkey Location within Marmara
- Coordinates: 41°11′17″N 27°46′05″E
- Country: Turkey
- Province: Tekirdağ

Government
  - Mayor: Müge Yıldız Topak (AKP)
- Area: 418 km^{2} (161 sq mi)
- Population (2022): 67,038
  - Density: 160/km^{2} (415/sq mi)
- Time zone: UTC+3 (TRT)
- Postal code: 59930
- Area code: 0282
- Website: www.ergene.bel.tr

Ergene is a municipality and district of Tekirdağ Province, Turkey. Its area is 418 km^{2}, and its population is 67,038 (2022). The district and municipality Ergene was created at the 2013 Turkish local government reorganisation from part of the district of Çorlu, including the former municipalities Marmaracık, Ulaş, Misinli and Velimeşe. The name Ergene refers to the river Ergene, a tributary of the Maritsa (Meriç).

== Composition ==
There are 17 neighbourhoods in Ergene District:

- Ahimehmet
- Bakırca
- Cumhuriyet
- Esenler
- İğneler
- Karamehmet
- Kırkgöz
- Marmaracık
- Misinli
- Paşaköy
- Pınarbaşı
- Sağlık
- Ulaş
- Vakıflar
- Velimeşe
- Yeşiltepe
- Yulaflı
