= Sarıpolat, Malkara =

Sarıpolat
- Neighbourhood
- Location in Turkey Sarıpolat (Marmara)
- Coordinates: 40°50′38″N 26°46′19″E
- Country: Turkey
- Province: Tekirdağ
- District: Malkara
- Elevation: 156 m (512 ft)
- Population (2022): 195
- Time zone: UTC+3 (TRT)
- Postal code: 59300
- Area code: 0282

Sarıpolat is a neighbourhood of the municipality and district of Malkara, Tekirdağ Province, Turkey. Its population is 195 (2022). It is situated in the eastern Thrace plains. The distance to Malkara is 12 kilometres (7.5 mi). The old name of this village is Teslim. It was a Bulgarian village during the Ottoman Empire era. But after the Second Balkan War the Bulgarian population was forced to leave the settlement.
