= Yaylagöne, Malkara =

Yaylagöne
- Neighbourhood
- Location in Turkey Yaylagöne (Marmara)
- Coordinates: 40°54′04″N 26°45′22″E
- Country: Turkey
- Province: Tekirdağ
- District: Malkara
- Elevation: 207 m (679 ft)
- Population (2022): 501
- Time zone: UTC+3 (TRT)
- Postal code: 59300
- Area code: 0282

Yaylagöne is a neighbourhood of the municipality and district of Malkara, Tekirdağ Province, Turkey. Its population is 501 (2022). It is situated in the Eastern Thrace plains. The distance to Malkara is 14 kilometres (8.7 mi). It was a Bulgarian village during the Ottoman Empire era. But after the Second Balkan War the Bulgarian population was forced to leave the settlement.
