= Izgar, Malkara =

Izgar
- Neighbourhood
- Location in Turkey Izgar (Marmara)
- Coordinates: 40°51′36″N 26°48′18″E
- Country: Turkey
- Province: Tekirdağ
- District: Malkara
- Elevation: 166 m (545 ft)
- Population (2022): 357
- Time zone: UTC+3 (TRT)
- Postal code: 59300
- Area code: 0282

Izgar is a neighbourhood of the municipality and district of Malkara, Tekirdağ Province, Turkey. Its population is 357 (2022). It is situated in the eastern Trakya (Thrace) plains. The distance to Malkara is 9 kilometres (5.6 mi). It was a Bulgarian village during the Ottoman Empire era. But after the Second Balkan War the Bulgarian population was forced to leave the settlement.
