= Malkara =

- District and municipality
- Map showing Malkara District in Tekirdağ Province

- Location within Turkey Location within Marmara
- Coordinates: 40°53′36″N 26°54′15″E
- Country: Turkey
- Province: Tekirdağ

Government
  - Mayor: Nergiz Karaağaçlı Öztürk (Yeni Parti)
- Area: 1,243 km^{2} (480 sq mi)
- Population (2022): 50,988
  - Density: 41.02/km^{2} (106.2/sq mi)
- Time zone: UTC+3 (TRT)
- Postal code: 59300
- Area code: 0282
- Website: www.malkara.bel.tr

Malkara (Greek: Μάλγαρα, Malgara) is a municipality and district of Tekirdağ Province, Turkey. Its area is 1,243 km^{2} (the largest in Tekirdağ Province), and its population is 50,988 (2022). It is located at 55 km west of Tekirdağ and 190 km from Istanbul. The mayor is Nergiz Karaağaçlı Öztürk (CHP).

== Climate ==
Malkara experiences a hot-summer Mediterranean climate (Köppen: Csa), with hot, dry summers, and chilly, rainy, somewhat snowy winters.

Climate data for Malkara (1991–2020)
Month	Jan	Feb	Mar	Apr	May	Jun	Jul	Aug	Sep	Oct	Nov	Dec	Year
Mean daily maximum °C (°F)	7.6 (45.7)	9.1 (48.4)	12.4 (54.3)	17.5 (63.5)	23.1 (73.6)	27.9 (82.2)	30.4 (86.7)	30.8 (87.4)	26.2 (79.2)	20.0 (68.0)	14.3 (57.7)	9.1 (48.4)	19.1 (66.4)
Daily mean °C (°F)	3.8 (38.8)	4.8 (40.6)	7.6 (45.7)	12.0 (53.6)	17.2 (63.0)	21.7 (71.1)	24.1 (75.4)	24.3 (75.7)	20.0 (68.0)	14.8 (58.6)	9.9 (49.8)	5.4 (41.7)	13.8 (56.8)
Mean daily minimum °C (°F)	0.6 (33.1)	1.3 (34.3)	3.6 (38.5)	7.2 (45.0)	11.9 (53.4)	16.0 (60.8)	18.2 (64.8)	18.5 (65.3)	14.8 (58.6)	10.7 (51.3)	6.3 (43.3)	2.3 (36.1)	9.3 (48.7)
Average precipitation mm (inches)	74.73 (2.94)	72.53 (2.86)	72.05 (2.84)	47.68 (1.88)	46.41 (1.83)	49.35 (1.94)	25.48 (1.00)	12.69 (0.50)	46.42 (1.83)	76.56 (3.01)	82.38 (3.24)	100.85 (3.97)	707.13 (27.84)
Average precipitation days (≥ 1.0 mm)	8.0	7.9	7.5	6.4	5.7	5.2	2.8	2.2	4.1	5.5	6.3	9.2	70.8
Average relative humidity (%)	81.3	78.9	75.6	70.9	68.6	65.2	61.5	61.5	66.3	74.7	79.3	81.4	72.1
Source: NOAA

== History ==
In antiquity, Malkara was known as Syracellae. In the Byzantine period, the city was known in Greek as Megale Karya (Μεγάλη Καρύα), whence the Ottoman name Magalkara.

Once the area had been brought under Ottoman control it was settled with Turks from Anatolia and a Turkish town emerged which thrived supplying the Ottoman cavalry regiments. Malkara was then used as a place of exile for those out of favor in the Ottoman court including:

- Hacı Evhat – personal tutor to Suleiman the Magnificent, who exiled Evhat in 1524 when he did not like the lessons
- Koca Sinan Pasha – statesman and Grand Vizier, exiled for four years here after the failure of his campaign against Persia in 1580
- Melek Ahmed Pasha – Grand Vizier, 1650–51
- Boynuyaralı Mehmed Pasha – Grand Vizier, 1656
- Bekri Mustafa Pasha – Grand Vizier, 1688–89

The 17th-century Ottoman traveler Evliya Çelebi described Malkara as a tidy, hard-working town of 150 houses of tiled roofs noted for production of honey, cheese, and leather.

At the end of the 18th century Malkara was the scene of an uprising by the Janissary troops in protest against plans by Sultan Selim III to replace them with a new model army.

Malkara was occupied by Russian troops in the Russo-Turkish War of 1828-1829, again by the Russians in The Russo-Turkish War of 1877–1878 and by the Bulgarians for 8.5 months during the Balkan Wars of 1912–1913. In the aftermath of the 1913 Ottoman coup d'état, Malkara was reoccupied by Ottoman troops.

During World War II, the Greek part of Thrace was occupied by German and Bulgarian troops, and when Turkey was preparing for a possible entry into the war against the Axis powers, refugees from Greece were briefly housed in Malkara for their safety.

== Malkara today ==
Malkara is a small market town serving the countryside around it, which is mostly devoted to growing sunflowers for seeds and oil. There are also one or two coal mines. Many of the people of Malkara originate in the Balkans and are liberal- and secular-minded.

== Composition ==
There are 77 neighbourhoods in Malkara District:

- Ahievren
- Ahmetpaşa
- Aksakal
- Alaybey
- Allıışık
- Bağpınarı
- Balabancık
- Ballı
- Ballısüle
- Batkın
- Bayramtepe
- Camiatik
- Çavuş Köy
- Çimendere
- Çınaraltı
- Çınarlıdere
- Danişment
- Davuteli
- Deliller
- Demircili
- Dereköy
- Deveci
- Develi
- Doğan Köy
- Dolu
- Elmalı
- Emirali
- Esendik
- Evrenbey
- Gazibey
- Gönence
- Gözsüz
- Güneşli
- Hacıevlat
- Hacısungur
- Halıç
- Hasköy
- Hemit
- Hereke
- İbribey
- İbrice
- İshakça
- Izgar
- Kadiköy
- Kalaycı
- Karacagür
- Karacahalil
- Karaiğdemir
- Karamurat
- Kavakçeşme
- Kermeyan
- Kiremitlik
- Kırıkali
- Kozyürük
- Küçükhıdır
- Kürtüllü
- Kuyucu
- Mestanlar
- Müstecep
- Pirinççeşme
- Sağlamtaş
- Şahin
- Sarıpolat
- Sarıyar
- Sarnıçköy
- Sırtbey
- Tekke Köy
- Teteköy
- Vakıfiğdemir
- Yayla Köy
- Yaylagöne
- Yeni
- Yenice
- Yenidibek
- Yılanlı
- Yörücek
- Yörük

== Places of interest ==
The village of Yenidibek with its reservoir and ruined Byzantine castle is a popular picnic spot.

== Notable people ==
- Orhan Öztrak (1914–1995), politician
