= Yenidibek, Malkara =

Yenidibek
- Neighbourhood
- Location in Turkey Yenidibek (Marmara)
- Coordinates: 40°46′19″N 26°49′59″E
- Country: Turkey
- Province: Tekirdağ
- District: Malkara
- Elevation: 76 m (249 ft)
- Population (2022): 184
- Time zone: UTC+3 (TRT)
- Postal code: 59300
- Area code: 0282

Yenidibek is a neighbourhood of the municipality and district of Malkara, Tekirdağ Province, Turkey. Its population is 184 (2022). It is situated in the Eastern Thrace plains. The distance to Malkara is 16 kilometres (9.9 mi). The old name of this village is Pişman. It was a Bulgarian village during the Ottoman Empire era. But after the Second Balkan War the Bulgarian population was forced to leave the settlement.
