= Mürefte =

- Neighbourhood
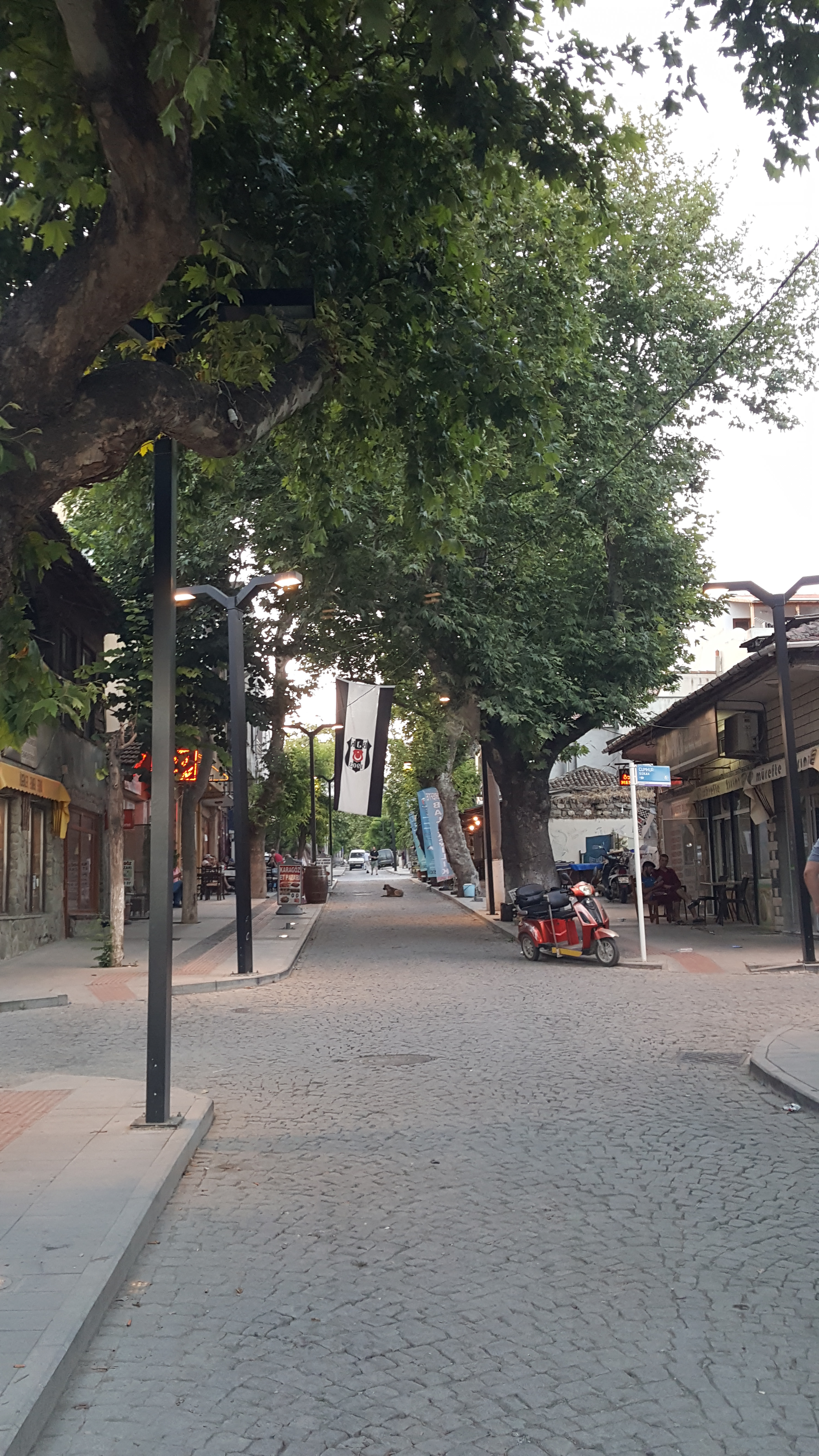
- Street of Mürefte

- Location within Turkey Location within Marmara
- Coordinates: 40°40′N 27°15′E
- Country: Turkey
- Province: Tekirdağ
- District: Şarköy
- Population (2022): 2,412
- Time zone: UTC+3 (TRT)

Mürefte is a neighbourhood of the municipality and district of Şarköy, Tekirdağ Province, Turkey. Its population is 2,412 (2022). Before the 2013 reorganisation, it was a town (belde). It is on the Sea of Marmara about 51 km southwest of Tekirdağ.

The early history of this town is not known. It is first mentioned in connection with an earthquake which destroyed it in the year 1063. It was visited by John Cantacuzene about 1350. After the population exchange some Megleno-Romanian families were settled.

== Ecclesiastical history ==
The original diocese was in Thracia Prima, a suffragan of Heraclea Perinthos.

A diocese of Peristasis (modern Şarköy) was established by 1170. The see was later transferred to Myriophyton, and renamed Peristasis and Myriophyton, mentioned first in a Notitia episcopatuum of the end of the fifteenth century. In the sixteenth century Myriophytum displaced Peristasis, and the diocese took the name of Myriophytum and Peristasis.

According to the Ottoman population statistics of 1914, the kaza of Mürefte had a population of 16,876 consisting of 14,146 Greeks (83.84%) and 2,730 Muslims (16.18%).

The Greek Orthodox diocese became in January 1909 an autocephalous metropolitan see, the Metropolitanate of Myriophyton and Peristasis. The Orthodox population of the metropolitanate was evacuated in October 1922, just before the Greco-Turkish population exchange, leaving no Orthodox population since then, but the church continues to appoint titular metropolitans to the see.

The last Roman Catholic holder of the titular see of Myriophytos or Miriofido died in 1932, and the see has been suppressed.

== Agriculture ==
The coastline between Tekirdağ and Şarköy, particularly Mürefte, are notable centers for viticulture and winemaking. A well-known wine producer, "Kutman", is located in the village, and maintains a wine museum also.

== Notable people ==
- Aristotelis Kourtidis (1858 – 1928), Greek educator and writer.
- Vasilis Logothetidis (1897 - 1960), Greek actor.

== Sources ==
- The entry cites:
- Drakos, Thrakika (in Greek, Athens, 1892), 72–93.
- Kiminas, Demetrius (2009). The Ecumenical Patriarchate: A History of Its Metropolitanates with Annotated Hierarch Catalogs. Wildside Press LLC. ISBN 9781434458766.
- Külzer, Andreas (2008). Tabula Imperii Byzantini: Band 12, Ostthrakien (Eurōpē) (in German). Vienna: Österreichische Akademie der Wissenschaften. p. 540. ISBN 978-3-7001-3945-4.
