= Şarköy =

- District and municipality
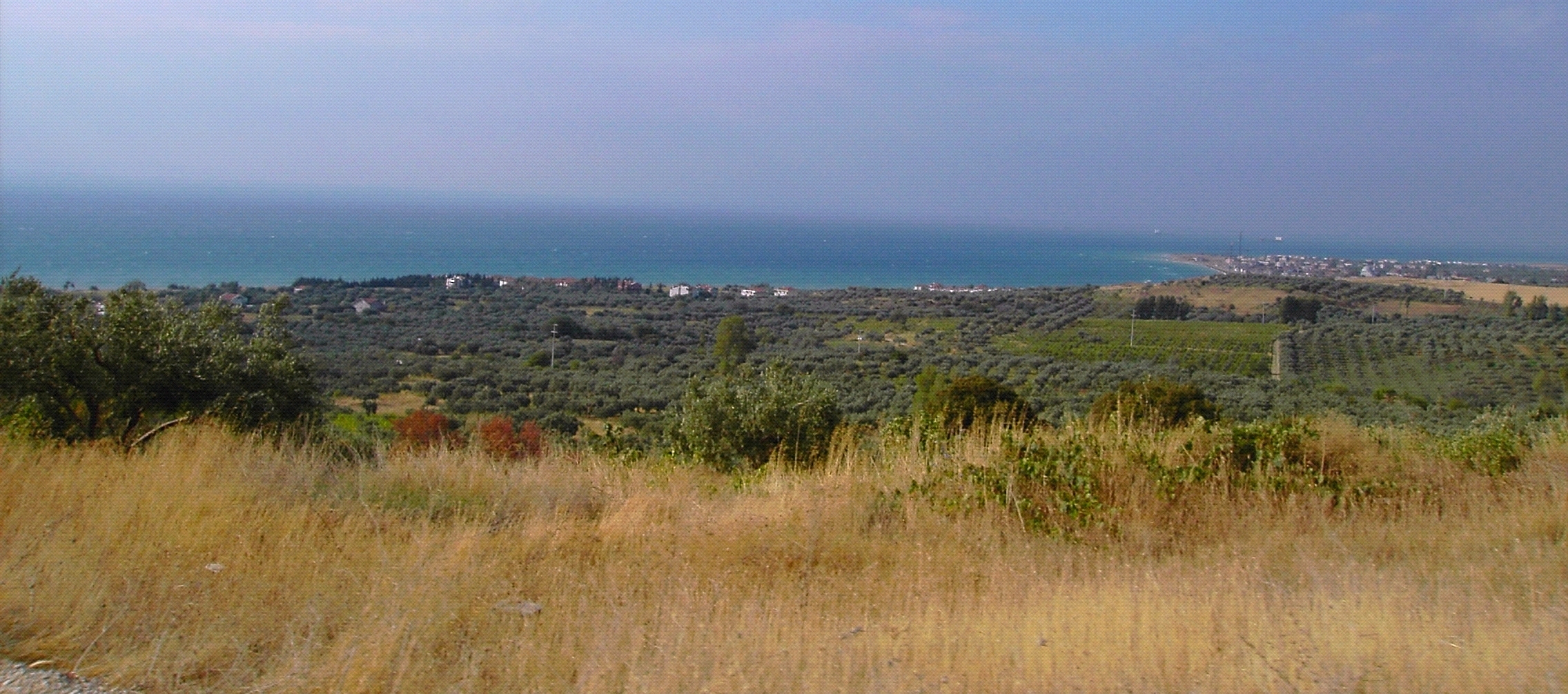
- A view of Şarköy from the heights

- Logo

- Map showing Şarköy District in Tekirdağ Province

- Location within Turkey Location within Marmara
- Coordinates: 40°36′14″N 27°06′23″E
- Country: Turkey
- Province: Tekirdağ

Government
  - Mayor: Alpay Var (New Party)
- Area: 487 km^{2} (188 sq mi)
- Elevation: 12 m (39 ft)
- Population (2022): 33,466
  - Density: 68.7/km^{2} (178/sq mi)
- Time zone: UTC+3 (TRT)
- Postal code: 59800
- Area code: 0282
- Website: www.sarkoy.bel.tr

Şarköy is a municipality and district of Tekirdağ Province, Turkey. Its area is 487 km^{2}, and its population is 33,466 (2022). It is a seaside town on the north coast of the Marmara Sea in East Thrace. Şarköy is 86 km west of the town of Tekirdağ, and can be reached either by the inland road or by the winding coast road, which goes on to Gallipoli. The mayor is Alpay Var (New Party).

== History ==
Stone-age weapons and implements have been found in the villages of Kızılca Terzi, Fener Karadutlar and Sofuköy. Bronze Age artefacts from 1200 BC have been found in İğde Bağları (Araplı), showing that mining took place here and also that there were trading links between Thrace and the Aegean coast.

Greek colonies were founded from 750 to 550 BC with the agreement of the local Thracians. The Greek villages of Heraklea (Eriklice) (Ancient Greek: Ηράκλεια), Chóra (Hoşköy) (Ancient Greek: Χώρα), Gános (Ganoz) (Ancient Greek: Γάνος), Panion (Barbaros) (Ancient Greek: Πανίον) later fell into the hands of the Romans. Then under Byzantine rule Thrace was subject to wave on wave of invaders coming via the Balkans; Huns, Slavs, Bulgars, the Crusaders. By this time the area was known as Tristatis (Ancient Greek: Τριστάτης), Peristasis (Ancient Greek: Περίστασις) and also Agorà (Ancient Greek: Αγορά).

Following the Ottoman invasion in 1362 the name of the city became 'Şehirköy' ('city-village') and later 'Şarköy'. The area was first invaded in 1356 by Süleyman Paşa, son of Orhangazi, the son of the founder of the Ottoman dynasty. It changed control a few times before coming under Ottoman control in 1362, and permanently after the fall of Constantinople, now Istanbul, in 1453.

In the Ottoman period this coastline thrived, growing produce to ship to Constantinople, wine production, and also making bricks and roof-tiles which were exported further afield.

Şarköy was a township (bucak) in Gelibolu sanjak and belonged to Kaptanpaşa vilayet at first. Gelibolu sanjak returning to Adrianople vilayet in 1864.

According to the Ottoman population statistics of 1914, the kaza of Şarköy had a total population of 16,613, consisting of 11,009 Greeks and 5,604 Muslims.

During the 20th century the Turkish authorities oppressed, persecuted and terrorized the Greek and other Christian population of the town and of the surrounding area and nearby towns, so as to compel them to flee. Towards the beginning of 1913, the authorities exacted from the inhabitants payment for the upkeep of the Turkish fleet. Also, imposed further contribution from the Christians for the construction of Government buildings, a Turkish school, telephonic communications, national defence, etc. At the same time the most rigorous boycott was exercised, for the purpose to bring famine the dispersion to the Christian Communities. In addition, the importation of provisions into the town was prohibited under the penalty of death and no communication between the town and the other communities was allowed, and as another precaution the boats were rendered useless by the removal of the oars.

The coast was occupied briefly by Bulgarian forces on December 22, 1912 during the Balkan Wars, and again in 1920–22 by Greek forces during the Greco-Turkish War, this time with the support of the local Greek and Armenian people. Şarköy was a district in Thrace province between 1922–1926 before returning to Tekirdağ province.

== The area today ==
Şarköy and Mürefte are small country towns providing the surrounding villages with amenities such as medical care and high schools. 90% of the land is cultivated, vineyards and olive groves near the coast, with sunflowers, wheat, barley and tobacco inland.

Şarköy has the longest beach in Turkey, the 12th longest in the world and in 2006 was awarded a blue flag. The district includes 60 km of coastline for tourism, fishing and prawn fishing. It is possible to take a motorboat from here to Avşa or Marmara Island.

The land behind the coast has a micro-climate suitable for vineyards and wine-making; Şarköy is known for its wine and holds a wine festival each autumn. Güler Sabancı has a winery here making a Cabernet Sauvignon called Gulor. The area also produces olives.

There is also an institute of Trakya University here.

== Composition ==
There are 31 neighbourhoods in Şarköy District:

- Aşağıkalamış
- Beyoğlu
- Bulgur
- Camikebir
- Çengelli
- Çınarlı
- Cumhuriyet
- Eriklice
- Gaziköy
- Gölcük
- Güzelköy
- Hoşköy
- İğdebağları
- İshaklı
- İstiklal
- Kirazlı
- Kızılcaterzi
- Kocaali
- Mürefte
- Mursallı
- Palamut
- Şenköy
- Sofuköy
- Tepeköy
- Uçmakdere
- Ulaman
- Yayaağaç
- Yayaköy
- Yeniköy
- Yörgüç
- Yukarıkalamış

== Agriculture ==
The coastline between Tekirdağ and Şarköy, particularly Uçmakdere and Mürefte, are important places for viticulture and winemaking. 22 of the 27 villages of Şarköy grow grape and produce wine. There are well-known wine producers in the region, including "Doluca", "Gülor", "Kutman", "Bağcı" and "Latif Aral". Other wine producers of the region is "Melen" in Hoşköy.

== Places of interest ==
- Great Mosque of Gazi Süleyman Pasha
- Uçmakdere - (formerly 'Avdim') 36 km from Şarköy, on a winding road along the cliffs from Tekirdağ. Uçmakdere is a lovely seaside village on a rocky coast with pretty wine-growing countryside behind. A wine making centre since the Byzantine period, Greek-built wineries still active today. Ruins of a Byzantine monastery, once silk was made here too. Partridge shooting on the steep hillside behind the village, and also great views.
- Gaziköy - 25 km from Şarköy, 2700 years of history including; fossils, ruined Byzantine houses and churches, the castle named 'Ganos'
- Hoşköy - (formerly 'Hora') 16 km from Şarköy, another village with vineyards ('Melen' and others) and a long history
- Eriklice - an old-established seaside fishing village with vineyards and olive groves
- Mürefte - (formerly 'Myrióphyton') - 13 km from Şarköy, an ancient tree-lined village on a lovely coastline, with views of Marmara Island across the sea. Wine-making and olive-growing. There are guest houses and restaurants for those looking for a weekend escape from Istanbul. Wine-making is a large-scale modern industry here now, well known grape varieties such as semillon and gamay are grown alongside the traditional local varieties for use in wineries including Kutman.
