= Prostagma =

Documents issued by the Byzantine Empire

A prostagma (Greek: πρόσταγμα) or prostaxis (πρόσταξις), both meaning "order, command", were documents issued by the Byzantine imperial chancery bearing an imperial decision or command, usually on administrative matters.

Prostaxis was the common term in the 11th–13th centuries, when it was replaced by prostagma. The earliest such document to survive dates to 1214, however. They were usually short documents, signed by the Byzantine emperor with the menologem in red ink, and usually with the emperor's wax seal. The prostagmata of the Emperors of Trebizond were signed with an abridged form of the imperial signature. Similar documents issued by the Despots were termed horismos, while those of the Patriarch of Constantinople or other state officials were variously termed [para]keleusis, entalma, grama, etc. Serbian rulers also issued prostagmata.

The prostagmata were used for "transmitting orders, [..] granting privileges, for legislating and for regulating, for attesting an oath taken by the emperor (horkomotikon prostagma)", as well as "for appointing individuals to administrative positions, or for granting honorific titles", replacing the probatoriae and codicilli inherited from late Roman practice and used until the 10th century.

== Sources ==
- Oikonomidès, Nicolas (1985). "La chancellerie impériale de Byzance du 13e au 15e siècle" [The Imperial Chancery of Byzantium from the 13th to the 15th Centuries]. Revue des études byzantines (in French). 43: 167–195. doi:10.3406/rebyz.1985.2171.
- Oikonomidès, Nicolas (1991). "Prostagma". In Kazhdan, Alexander (ed.). The Oxford Dictionary of Byzantium. New York and Oxford: Oxford University Press. p. 1740. ISBN 978-0-19-504652-6.
- Ostrogorsky, George (1968). "Prostagme srpskih vladara" [The Prostagmas of the Serbian Rulers]. Prilozi za književnost, jezik, istoriju i fołklor (in Serbo-Croatian). 34: 245–257.
