= John Drimys =

John Drimys (Greek: Ἰωάννης Δριμὺς) was a Byzantine priest who led a failed conspiracy against Emperor Andronikos II Palaiologos in 1305.

He came from the "west" (most likely Epirus or Thessaly) to Constantinople. Claiming that he was a descendant of the Laskaris family, which had ruled the Empire of Nicaea until it had been usurped by the Palaiologoi, he headed a conspiracy against Andronikos II Palaiologos. The monastery of Mosele served as their headquarters. The plot was discovered in the winter of 1305, and he was tried, condemned and defrocked by Patriarch Athanasius I of Constantinople.

As Donald Nicol comments, Drimys' plot was the last pro-Laskarid restoration attempt: the fall of Byzantine Asia Minor, a stronghold of pro-Laskarid sentiment, to the advancing Turks, as well as the resolution of the Arsenite Schism, which was also tied to the Palaiologan usurpation, deprived the cause of centres of support.

== Sources ==
- Nicol, Donald M. (1993). The Last Centuries of Byzantium, 1261–1453 (Second ed.). London: Rupert Hart-Davis Ltd. ISBN 0-246-10559-3.
- Trapp, Erich; Beyer, Hans-Veit; Walther, Rainer; Sturm-Schnabl, Katja; Kislinger, Ewald; Leontiadis, Ioannis; Kaplaneres, Sokrates (1976–1996). Prosopographisches Lexikon der Palaiologenzeit (in German). Vienna: Verlag der Österreichischen Akademie der Wissenschaften. ISBN 3-7001-3003-1.
