= Aristotelis Kourtidis =

Greek educator and writer

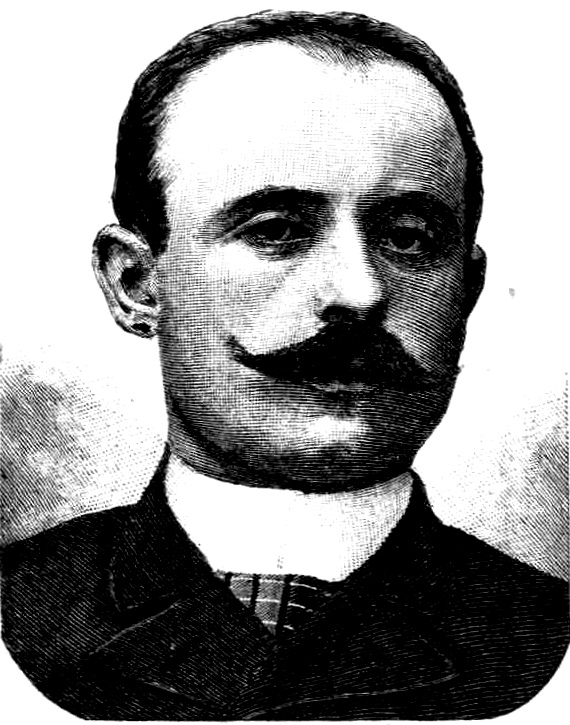
Aristotelis Kourtidis

Aristotelis Kourtidis (Greek: Αριστοτέλης Κουρτίδης; 1858 in Myriofyto – 1928 in Piraeus) was a distinguished Greek educator and writer.

He was born in Myriofyto of Eastern Thrace and lived the first years of his life in Istanbul, where he studied in the Great School of the Nation. In 1880 he went to Athens to study law at the University of Athens, but he did not complete his studies. Later he studied literature at the University of Athens and met the writer and historian, Dimitrios Kambouroglou through whom he came in contact with the director of the Diaplasis ton Paidon (Children's Edification) magazine, Nikolaos Papadopoulos –whose sister later he married– and worked in the magazine.

From 1880 until 1893 he was chief editor of the Diaplasis ton Paidon, and he was publishing original or adapted children's stories. At the same time he collaborated with several magazines and newspapers such as Evdomas, Hestia, Clio, Panathinaia, Asty, etc.

In 1889, he went to Germany where he studied pedagogy and philosophy. On his return to Greece, he was professor at various schools like Arsakeio, the Athens Conservatory, the School of Greek Women Association and the Girls High School in Piraeus, which he directed until his death. In 1882, he was one of the founding members of the Historical and Ethnological Society of Greece and later participated in the establishment of the Royal Dramatic School.

Kourtidis had strong social and educational activity; he was one of the promoters of the demotic language, he signed with other scholars the statute for the establishment of the Educational Association and in 1917 he wrote one of the textbooks of the educational reform of Eleftherios Venizelos and contributed to the effort to improve the educational level of Greek women. He also gave a series of lectures on psychology and participated in numerous charitable activities.

Aristotelis Kourtidis died in 1928 in Piraeus of dengue fever. According to the website of the Greek Masonic Lodge, Kourtidis was a member of the lodge Pythagoras.

== Bibliography ==
- Aikaterini Dermitzaki (2013). Το Εθνικό Ιστορικό Μουσείο της Ιστορικής και Εθνολογικής Εταιρείας της Ελλάδος: ίδρυση, συλλεκτική πολιτική και άλλες δράσεις (1882–1926). Athens: National and Kapodistrian University of Athens.
