= Çorlu =

- District and municipality
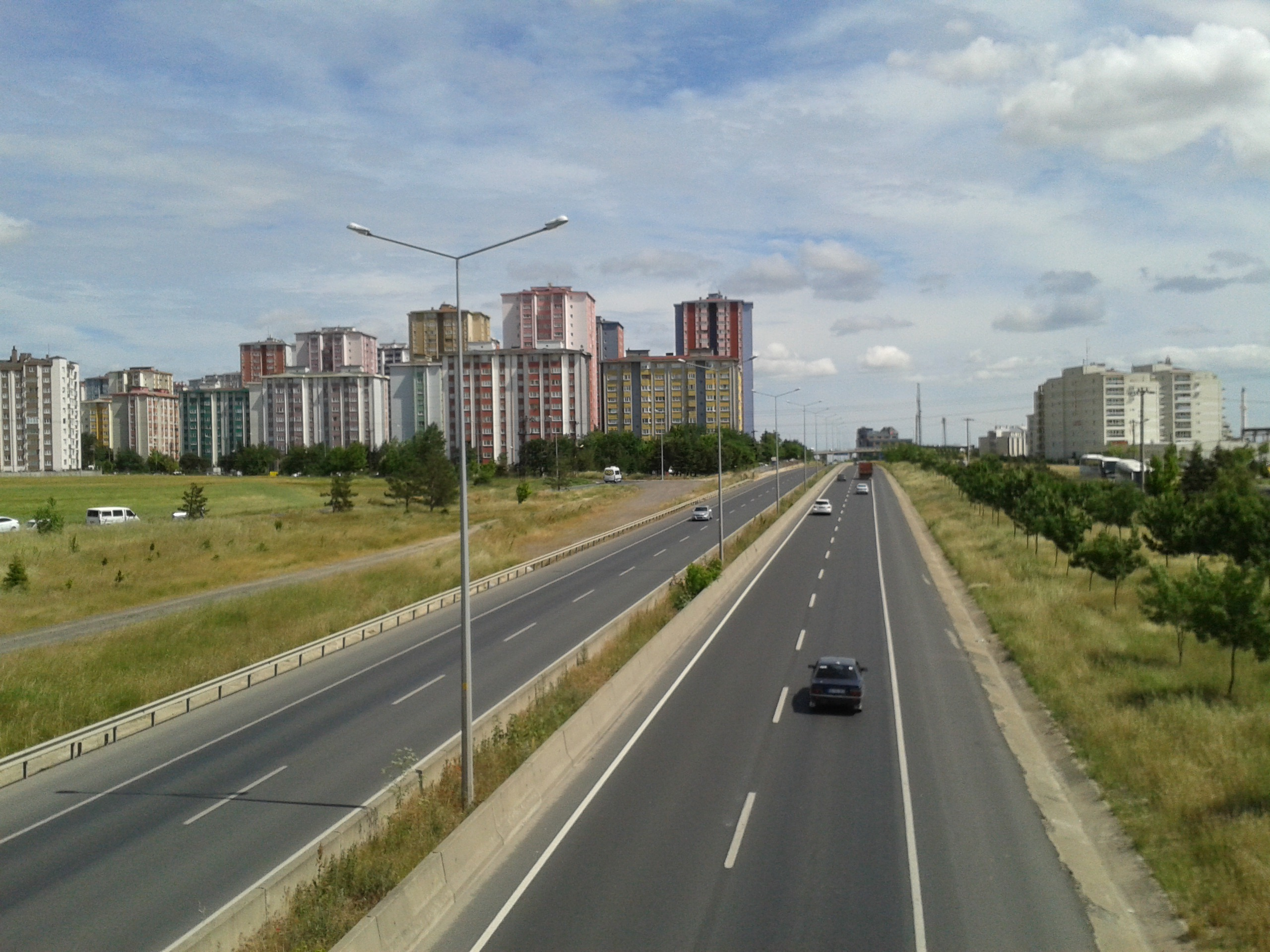
- Emlak Konutları towerblocks – a prominent site of the city

- Logo

- Map showing Çorlu District in Tekirdağ Province

- Location within Turkey Location within Marmara
- Coordinates: 41°09′N 27°48′E
- Country: Turkey
- Province: Tekirdağ

Government
  - Mayor: Ahmet Sarıkurt (New Party)
- Area: 531 km^{2} (205 sq mi)
- Elevation: 193 m (633 ft)
- Population (2025): 306,939
  - Density: 578/km^{2} (1,500/sq mi)
- Time zone: UTC+3 (TRT)
- Area code: 0282
- Website: www.corlu.bel.tr

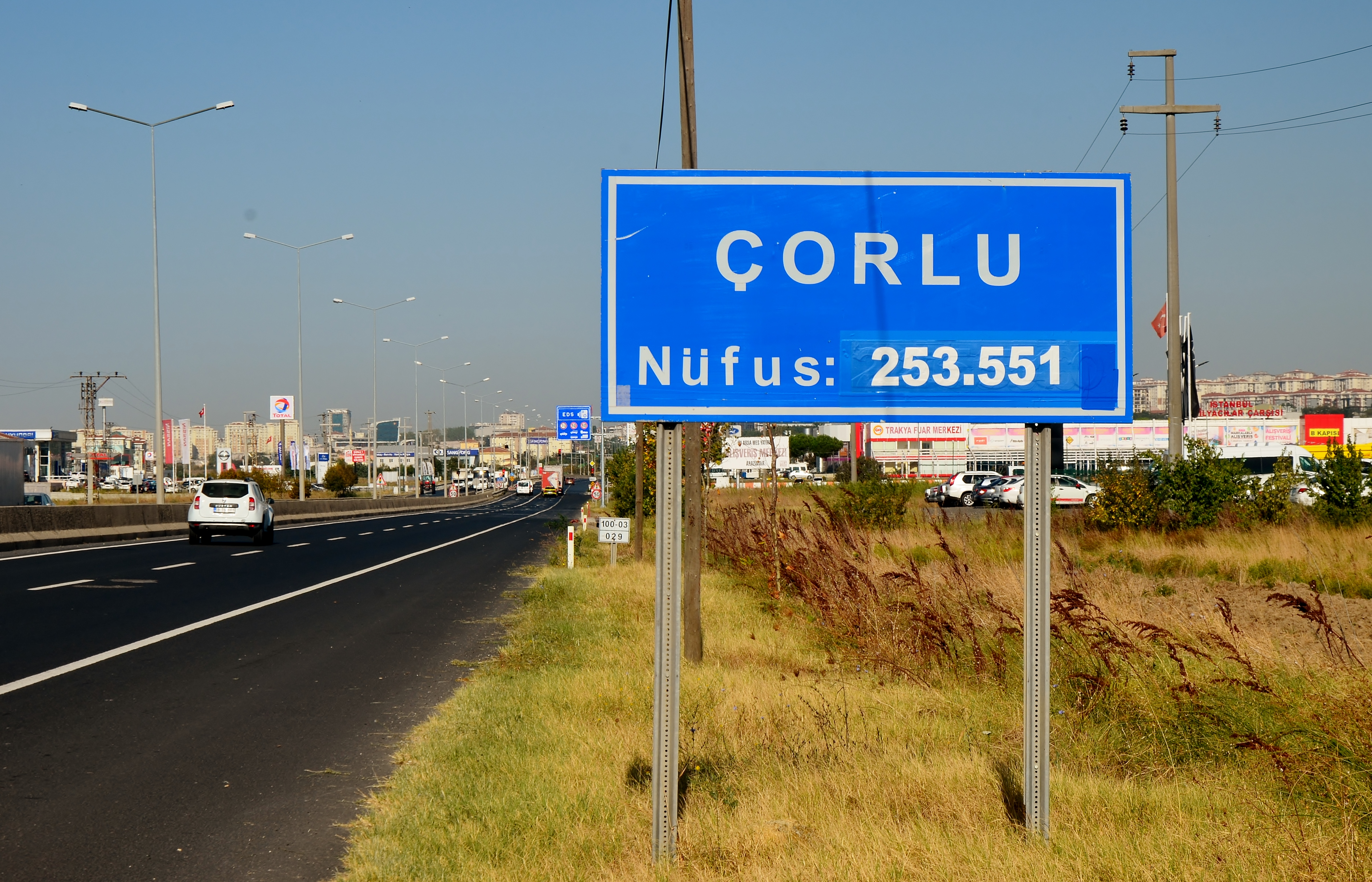
Çorlu place-name sign on the state road D.100 (2017).

Çorlu (Turkish: [ˈtʃoɾɫu]) is a municipality and district of Tekirdağ Province, northwestern Turkey. Its area is 531 km^{2}, and its population is 306,939 (2025). It is a rapidly growing industrial center built on flatland located on the motorway Otoyol 3 and off the highway D.100 between Istanbul and Turkey's border with Greece and Bulgaria. The nearest airport is Tekirdağ Çorlu Atatürk Airport (TEQ).

== History ==
Bronze Age relics have been found in various areas of Thrace including Çorlu and by 1000 BC, the area was a Phrygian-Greek colony. The area was subsequently controlled by the Greeks, Persians, Romans, and Byzantines.

During Roman and Byzantine times, the town was referred to as Tzouroulos, or Syrallo, and later became Tiroloi (Τυρολόη). The spelling Zorolus is used for the Latinised form of the name of the episcopal see identified with present-day Çorlu in the Catholic Church's list of titular sees. Some writers have identified the Roman town of Caenophrurium (the stronghold of the Caeni and the place where Emperor Aurelian was murdered in 275) with Çorlu, but this seems unlikely as the Antonine Itinerary lists Cenofrurium as two stages and 36 Roman miles (53 kilometre) closer to Byzantium than Tzirallum, and the Tabula Peutingeriana shows the locations separately. There were important Roman and Byzantine fortifications at Caenophrurium, which was a base for controlling large areas of Thrace.

=== Ottoman era onwards ===
Following a tumultuous early history, Çorlu was brought under Ottoman control by Sultan Murad I, who immediately ordered the destruction of the Roman walls as part of a policy of opening up the town under the Pax Ottomana. In the Ottoman period, the town remained an important staging post on the road from Constantinople to Greece.

The nearby village of Uğraşdere was the site of the battle in which Sultan Beyazid II defeated his son Selim I in August 1511; a year later Beyazid II was defeated by Selim, becoming the first Ottoman father to be overthrown by his son. Beyazid II died in Çorlu on his way to exile in Dimetoka. Coincidentally, Selim himself died in Çorlu nine years into his reign. Both father and son are buried in Istanbul.

In the late 18th century, when the Ottoman Empire began to decline in both military and economic power, the city found itself at the crossroads of numerous conflicts. Turkish refugees were settled in the city when the Ottomans lost control of Crimea to the Russians. The grandchildren of these refugees met the Russians themselves when Çorlu was briefly occupied by Russian troops during the Russo-Turkish War of 1877-1878. During the Balkan Wars of 1912–1913, Çorlu served as the command post for the Ottoman army, but was taken by Bulgarian troops in December 1912.; it was recaptured by Turkish forces during the Second Balkan War in July 1913. Çorlu was then occupied by Greek troops from 1920 to 1922 during the Turkish War of Independence, but was eventually ceded by Britain in accordance with the armistice of Mudanya. The Greeks of Çorlu (Tiroloi) then resettled in Ptolemaida after the population exchange.

The city became a part of the Republic of Turkey following its foundation in 1923. It continues to be an important garrison for the Turkish army as the home of the 189th Infantry Regiment. At the 2013 Turkish local government reorganisation part of the district of Çorlu was detached to form the new district Ergene.

=== 2018 train derailment ===
On 8 July 2018, a passenger train operated by Turkish State Railways derailed near Sarılar in the Çorlu district. Twenty-five people were killed and more than 300 were injured. In April 2024, the Çorlu 1st High Criminal Court sentenced nine railway officials to prison terms in connection with the disaster.

== Çorlu today ==
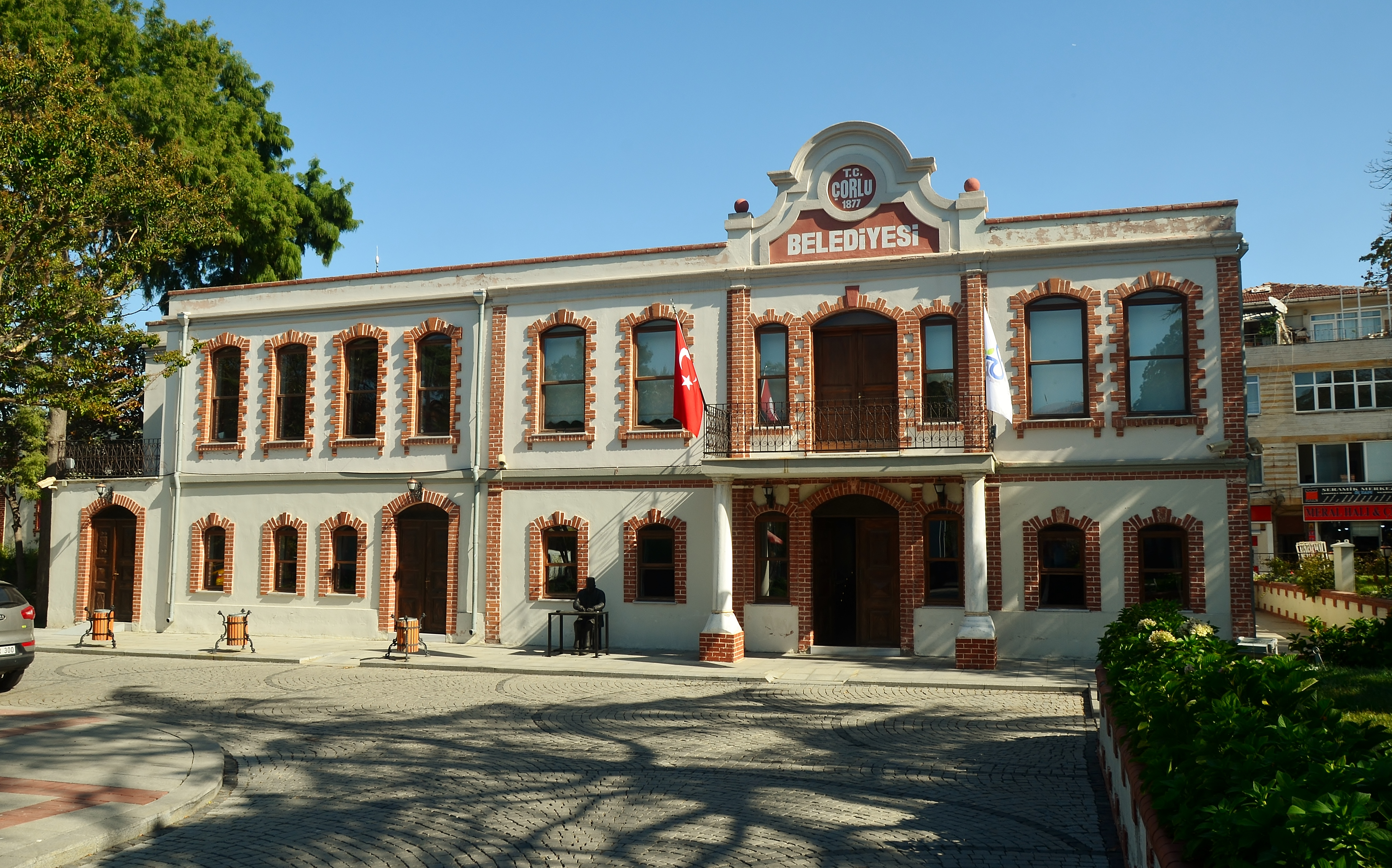
Historical municipal building of the city.

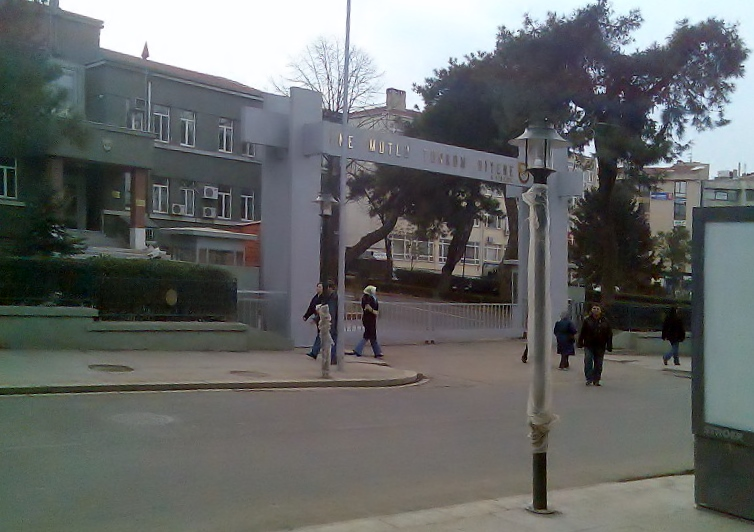
5th Army Corps

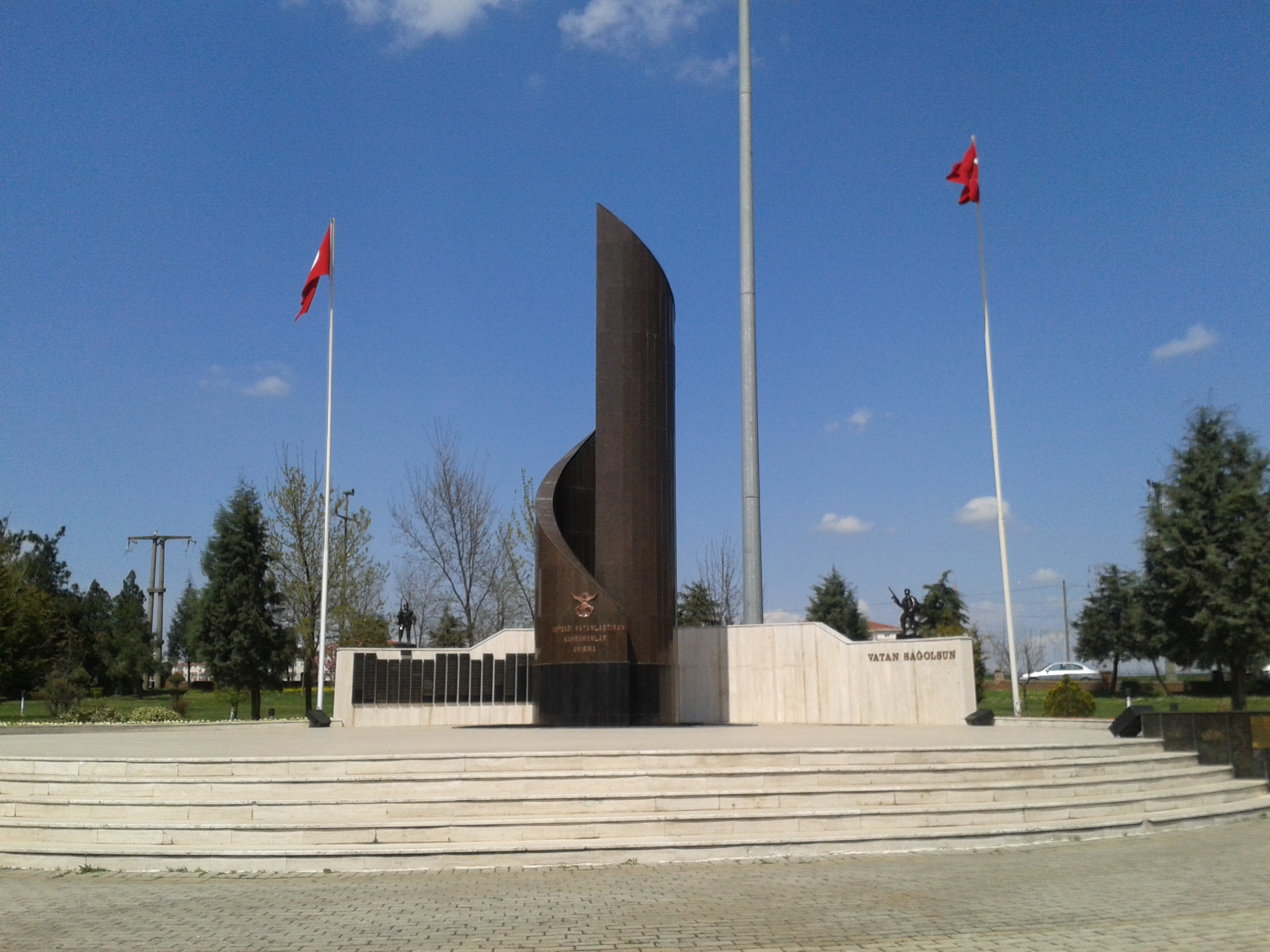
Çorlu war memorial

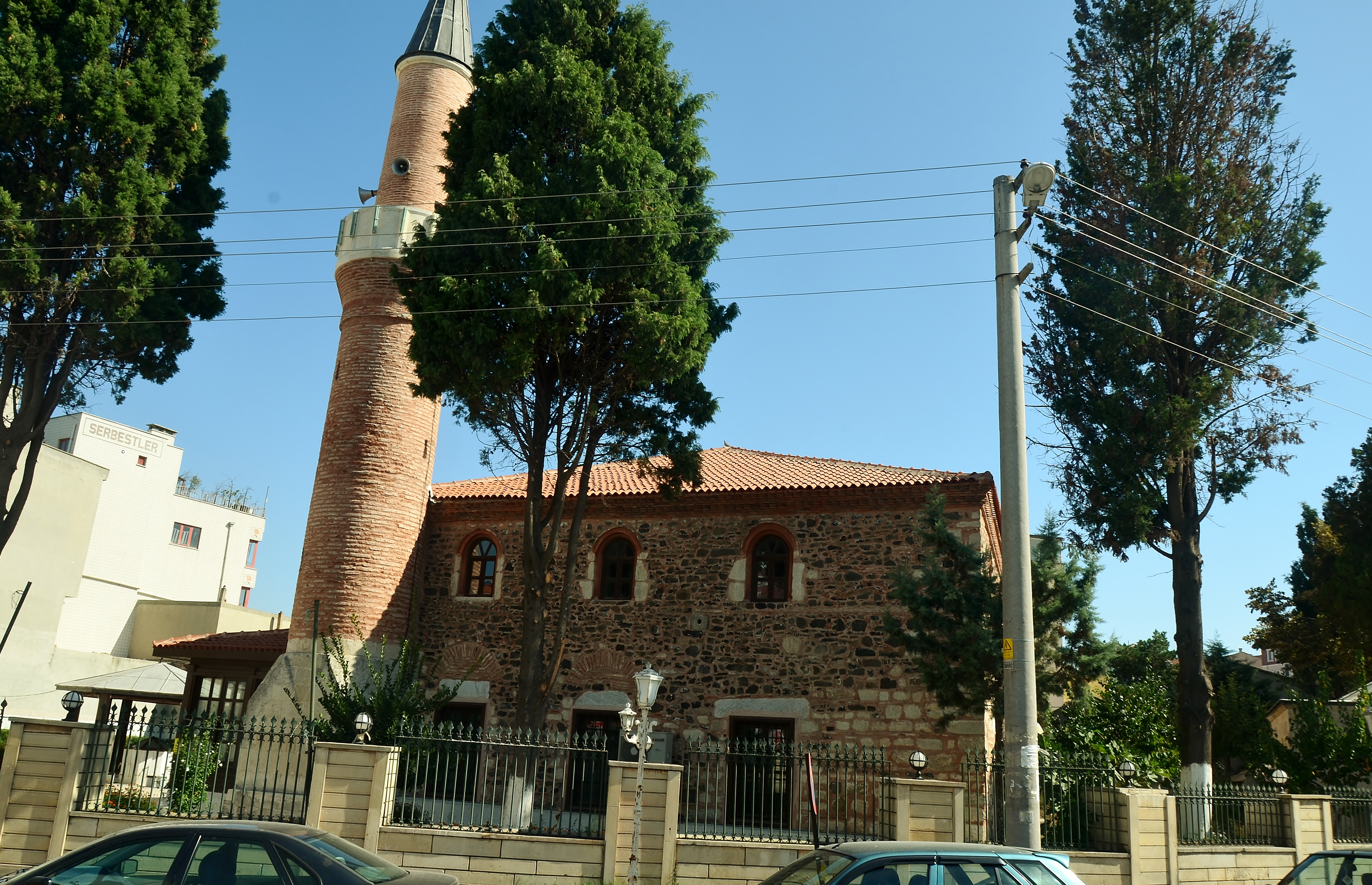
Fatih Mosque (1453)

The city today is more populous than the provincial capital of Tekirdağ, owing to a population spurt initially caused by the 1989 expulsion of Turks from Bulgaria who complemented the traditional left-leaning, industrial working-class of Çorlu; a second wave of migrants from rural Anatolia came to work in the factories in the 1990s and they now make up much of the conservative populace of the city. There are also small Romani and Jewish communities. For a while the city also had a population of ethnic Albanians and Bosnians flown in during the Kosovo conflict as part of Turkey and North Macedonia's efforts to aid the populations of former Yugoslavia by offering them temporary asylum.

The town centre consists of a mixture of traditional structures and modern concrete apartment blocks providing public housing, as well as amenities such as basic shopping and fast-food restaurants, and essential infrastructure. However, there is little in the way of culture beyond cinemas and wedding-party venues. The road through the city center is often congested, as it isn't adequate for the needs of a city of a quarter million people. Local shopping facilities have recently been enhanced by the 25 km^{2} Orion Mall. There is little to no nightlife but, since Çorlu is close to Istanbul, locals can and often do easily go to "the city" for the weekend.

Çorlu today is a typical Turkish boomtown. The population grew rapidly without proper infrastructure being developed to cope. The city center has remained almost the same size since the early 1990s when the population started to rise. The prison, the 5th Army Corps, a gas station etc. used to be outside the town before the "boom" but are not part of the city center. Since around year 2000, the eastern side of the city has been filling up with tower blocks which constitute a satellite area. Alongside Omurtak Boulevard on the east side, many facilities appeared (banks, restaurants, malls, police station etc.), creating a second "center" and reducing the need to travel to the actual center.

=== Attractions ===
Çorlu has very little to show for its past although the simple Fatih Mosque does date back to 1453 and the Süleymaniye Mosque to 1521. In 1970, the town's one synagogue was converted into the Yeni Camii (New Mosque). It was restored in accordance with the original design and without changing the ceiling decorations or column capitals.

== Climate ==
Çorlu experiences a hot-summer Mediterranean climate (Köppen: Csa), with very warm, moderately dry summers, and cool, rainy, occasionally snowy winters.

Climate data for Çorlu (1991–2020)
Month	Jan	Feb	Mar	Apr	May	Jun	Jul	Aug	Sep	Oct	Nov	Dec	Year
Mean daily maximum °C (°F)	7.2 (45.0)	8.7 (47.7)	12.1 (53.8)	17.2 (63.0)	22.6 (72.7)	27.4 (81.3)	29.7 (85.5)	29.7 (85.5)	25.4 (77.7)	19.8 (67.6)	14.1 (57.4)	9.0 (48.2)	18.6 (65.5)
Daily mean °C (°F)	3.8 (38.8)	4.6 (40.3)	7.3 (45.1)	11.6 (52.9)	16.7 (62.1)	21.3 (70.3)	23.5 (74.3)	23.5 (74.3)	19.5 (67.1)	14.8 (58.6)	10.0 (50.0)	5.5 (41.9)	13.6 (56.5)
Mean daily minimum °C (°F)	0.8 (33.4)	1.4 (34.5)	3.4 (38.1)	6.9 (44.4)	11.6 (52.9)	15.7 (60.3)	17.7 (63.9)	18.0 (64.4)	14.5 (58.1)	10.8 (51.4)	6.5 (43.7)	2.6 (36.7)	9.2 (48.6)
Average precipitation mm (inches)	53.88 (2.12)	55.57 (2.19)	51.0 (2.01)	44.87 (1.77)	48.68 (1.92)	46.41 (1.83)	29.76 (1.17)	18.1 (0.71)	41.9 (1.65)	69.62 (2.74)	62.77 (2.47)	69.62 (2.74)	592.18 (23.31)
Average precipitation days (≥ 1.0 mm)	8.1	7.1	7.2	6.2	5.9	5.4	3.3	2.5	4.4	5.7	6.3	8.8	70.9
Average relative humidity (%)	86.0	83.2	79.2	74.6	73.1	70.8	68.8	71.4	73.7	79.8	83.6	85.7	77.5
Source: NOAA

== Economy ==
With more than 300 factories, Çorlu is a major textile-producing town, with Levi's and Mavi Jeans being among the companies that have factories here as well as large outlet centers intended to attract consumers from all over Thrace and Istanbul (Levi's closed its Çorlu factory in August 2014).

Çorlu also produces foodstuffs and soft drinks like Coca-Cola, and Unilever products like Algida ice-cream and Calvé condiments. As of 2009, Hewlett-Packard and Foxconn Group have formed a joint venture to build a large factory and production complex that will enable the two companies to use Çorlu, and Turkey in general, as the hub of their production activities for Eastern Europe and the Middle East.

== Education ==
Tekirdağ Namık Kemal University operates the Çorlu Faculty of Engineering and Çorlu Vocational School in the district.

The Çorlu Faculty of Engineering was established in 1992 as part of Trakya University and began admitting students in the 1993–94 academic year. It later became part of Namık Kemal University following the university's establishment in 2006. The faculty includes departments in fields such as computer, biomedical, environmental, electrical and electronics, industrial, civil, mechanical and textile engineering.

Çorlu Vocational School was established in 1987 under Trakya University and became affiliated with Namık Kemal University in 2006. It offers vocational programs in areas including environmental technologies, electronics, food technology, machinery, automotive technology, accounting, marketing, textile technology, civil aviation management and business administration.

== Composition ==
There are 26 neighbourhoods in Çorlu District:

- Alipaşa
- Cemaliye
- Çobançeşme
- Cumhuriyet
- Deregündüzlü
- Esentepe
- Hatip
- Havuzlar
- Hıdırağa
- Hürriyet
- Kazımiye
- Kemalettin
- Maksutlu
- Muhittin
- Nusratiye
- Önerler
- Reşadiye
- Rumeli
- Şahpaz
- Sarılar
- Şeyhsinan
- Seymen
- Silahtarağa
- Türkgücü
- Yenice
- Zafer

== International relations ==
Çorlu is twinned with:

- Kardzhali, Bulgaria
- Babruysk, Belarus
- Bugojno, Bosnia and Herzegovina
- Tutrakan, Bulgaria
- Kumanovo, North Macedonia
- Putian, China
- Krushari, Bulgaria
- Dulovo, Bulgaria
