= Partitio terrarum imperii Romaniae =

1204 treaty dividing the Byzantine Empire

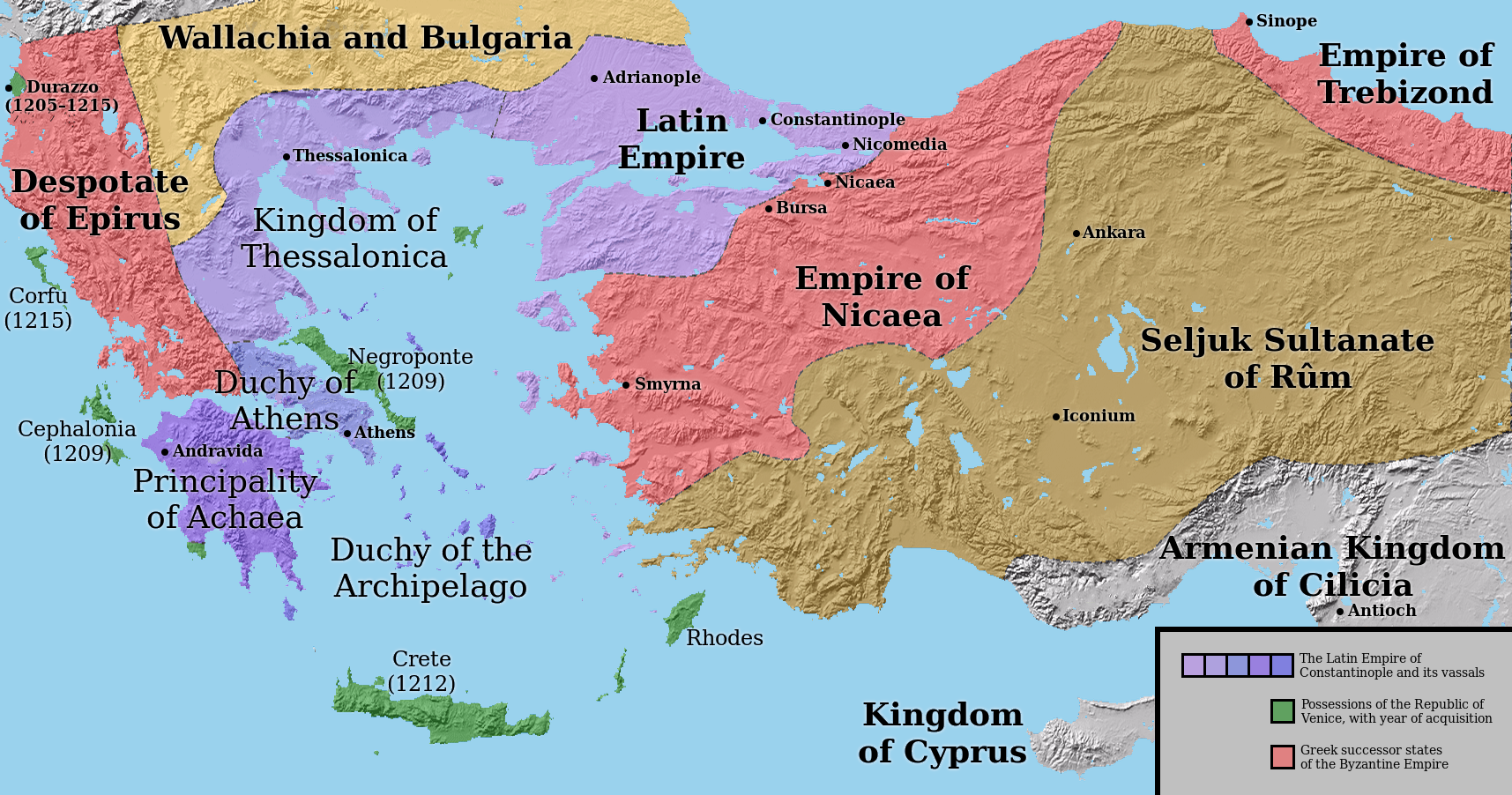
- The actual partition of the Byzantine Empire after the Fourth Crusade
- Context: Sack of Constantinople during the Fourth Crusade
- Signed: 1204
- Location: Constantinople, Latin Empire (now Istanbul, Turkey)
- Signatories: Latin Empire; Republic of Venice

The Partitio terrarum imperii Romaniae (Latin for "Partition of the lands of the empire of Romania (Note: Romanía (Greek: Ῥωμανία) meaning "Land of the Romans," see Kaldellis, Anthony. (2019). "Romanland: Ethnicity and Empire in Byzantium". Harvard University Press: 84.) [i.e., the Eastern Roman or Byzantine Empire]), or Partitio regni Graeci ("Partition of the kingdom of the Greeks"), was a treaty signed among the crusaders after the sack of the Byzantine capital, Constantinople, by the Fourth Crusade in 1204. It established the Latin Empire and arranged the nominal partition of the Byzantine territory among the participants of the Crusade, with the Republic of Venice being the greatest titular beneficiary. However, because the crusaders did not in fact control most of the Empire, local Byzantine Greek nobles established a number of Byzantine successor kingdoms (Empire of Nicaea, Empire of Trebizond, Despotate of Epirus). As a result, much of the crusaders' declared division of the Empire amongst themselves could never be implemented. The Latin Empire established by the treaty would last until 1261, when the Empire of Nicaea reconquered Constantinople, re-establishing the Byzantine Empire. The various crusader principalities in southern Greece and the Aegean archipelago would last much longer, until they were conquered by the Ottomans in the 14th and 15th centuries.

== Background ==
=== Preliminary agreement of March 1204 ===
In March 1204, shortly before the sack of Constantinople in April, the Crusaders made a preliminary arrangement on the partition of the Byzantine territories between themselves. This text, concluded between the principal leaders of the Crusade, the Doge of Venice Enrico Dandolo, Marquess Boniface I of Montferrat, Count Baldwin IX of Flanders, and Count Louis I of Blois, has been preserved among the letters of Pope Innocent III.

According to its stipulations, the Venetians would retain their previous privileges granted by the Byzantine emperors, and a common committee, composed in equal numbers of six Venetians and six Crusaders, would elect an emperor for the Latin Empire to be established after the conquest of the city. The new Latin Emperor, whether Venetian or 'Frank' (i.e., one of the Crusader barons) would receive one quarter of all territories, as well as the imperial palaces of Blachernae and Boukoleon and one quarter of the city. The losing party would receive the Hagia Sophia and the right to nominate the Latin Patriarch of Constantinople. The remaining three quarters of the city and the other Byzantine territories would be divided equally between Venice and the other Crusaders.

=== Election of Baldwin of Flanders ===
On 9 May, Baldwin of Flanders was elected Latin Emperor, in place of the previous leader of the Crusade, Boniface of Montferrat. According to the Crusader and chronicler Geoffrey of Villehardouin, by previous agreement, Boniface should receive the territories lying beyond the Bosporus and Marmara Sea, "towards Turkey", as well as "the isle of Greece". However, to placate Boniface, Baldwin agreed to assign to him the Kingdom of Thessalonica instead.

== Treaty ==
The agreement was likely promulgated either in late September or early October 1204 (Note: Nikolaos Oikonomides proposed a dating to immediately after the sack in April–May 1204, but this has been criticized and generally rejected.) and was drafted by a 24-man committee consisting of 12 Venetians and 12 representatives of the other Crusader leaders. The Venetians played a major role in the proceedings, as they had first-hand knowledge of the area, and many of the final text's provisions can be traced to the imperial chrysobull granted to Venice in 1198 by Alexios III Angelos. It gave the Latin Emperor direct control of one fourth of the former Byzantine territory, to Venice three eighths, and the remaining three eighths were apportioned among the other Crusader chiefs. As far as Constantinople itself is concerned, in the event, the Crusader portion of the city was absorbed into the Emperor's. According to the historian David Jacoby, this division was likely formalized in another agreement that has not survived, and that may have occurred even before the sack itself.

The treaty survives in a number of manuscripts, all from Venice: the Liber Albus (fols. 34ff.), the Liber Pactorum (Vol. I, fols. 246ff. and Vol. II, fols. 261ff.), the Codex Sancti Marci 284, folio 3, and the Muratorii codices Ambrosiani I and II. The first critical edition of the treaty was published in the collection of Venetian diplomatic documents compiled by Gottlieb Tafel and Georg Thomas for the Imperial Academy of Sciences in Vienna in 1856, while A. Carile published an up-to-date edition with full commentary in 1965.

=== Territorial provisions ===
According to the treaty's provisions, the territories were divided in the portion of the "Lord Doge and Commune of Venice" (pars domini Ducis et communis Venetiae), the portion of the Latin Emperor (pars domini Imperatoris), and the remainder as the portion of the Crusaders, or "pilgrims" (pars Peregrinorum).

Latin text	Translation	Portion	Region	Comments
Civitas (Note: The equivalent Byzantine administrative terms would be polis ("city") or kastron ("fortress").) Archadiopoli. Missini. Bulgarofigo. (Pertinentia (Note: The Latin term pertinentia is an equivalent to the Byzantine fiscal district of episkepsis, usually pertaining to imperial, monastic, or private estates.) Archadiopoli).	the cities of Arcadiopolis, Mesene, Bulgarophygon, forming part of the episkepsis of Arcadiopolis	Venice	Eastern Thrace	The same areas are mentioned in the chrysobull of 1198 as part of the episkepsis of Messene, Arcadiopolis, and Bulgarophygon.
Pertinentia Putis/Pucis et Nicodimi	the episkepsis of Poutza and "Nicodimi"	Venice	Eastern Thrace	"Nicodimi" remains unidentified; Carile suggested an identification with the town and bishopric of Nike.
Civitas Heraclee/Yraclee.	the city of Heraclea Perinthus	Venice	Eastern Thrace	
Pertinentia Chalkidos, cum civitate Rodosto et Panido, cum omnibus, que sub ipsis.	the episkepsis of Chalcis with the cities of Raidestos and Panidos with all their dependencies	Venice	Eastern Thrace	
Civitas Adrianopoli cum omnibus, que sub ipsa.	the city of Adrianople with its dependencies	Venice	Eastern Thrace	
Pertinentia Gani.	the episkepsis of Ganos	Venice	Eastern Thrace	
Casale (Note: The term casale could be equated either with chorion ("village") or proasteion ("landed estate").) Chortocop[l]i. Casalia Chotriki, Kerasea, Miriofitum.	the settlements of Chortokopeion, Chortriki, Kerasia, and Myriophyton	Venice	Eastern Thrace	Chortokopeion (Χορτοκόπειον) is known from a document from Mount Athos dating to the mid-11th century, but its exact location remains unknown. It was probably located east of Apros, on a crossing of the roads leading from Gallipoli to Adrianople and from Kypsela to Raidestos. Chotriki (Χοτρικί) otherwise unattested, possibly identical with Chora.
Pertinentia Peristasi.	the episkepsis of Peristasis	Venice	Eastern Thrace	
Pertinentia Brachioli.	the episkepsis of Branchialion	Venice	Eastern Thrace	Location not certain, but close to modern İnceburun. Attested in the 1198 chrysobull, a Catalan portolan from c. 1200, and in later Byzantine sources.
Casalia de Raulatis et Examilii. Emporium Sagudai.	the settlements of Raulaton, Hexamilion, and Sagoudaous	Venice	Thracian Chersonese	Location of Raulaton (χωρίον τῶν Ῥαουλάτων) not certain, probably close to Hexamilion at the base of the Thracian Chersonese (Gallipoli peninsula). Its name likely refers to the Raoul family. The location of the settlement (emporion) of Sagoudaous (Σαγουδάους) or Sagoude (Σαγούδη) is attested as a port and warehouse in 1152. Its location is not clear, but must have lain in the northern part of the Gallipoli Peninsula, or near Ainos.
Pertinentia Gallipoli	the episkepsis of Kallipolis	Venice	Thracian Chersonese	
Lazu et Lactu	Lazou and Laktou	Venice	Eastern Thrace	Both Lazou (Λάζου) and Laktou (Λάκτου) are otherwise unattested; from their location in the text they must have been in the neighbourhood of Kallipolis.
Pertinentia de Muntimanis et Sigopotamo, cum omnibus, que sub ipsis.	the episkepsis of Mountimanoi and the Sigos River with their dependencies	Venice	Thracian Chersonese	The ἐπίσκεψις τῶν Μουντιμάνων is not elsewhere attested, but was probably located in the south of the Thracian Chersonese. The Sigos River is likely to be identified with the modern Kavakaltı Dere or, less likely, the Çeşme Dere, in the southern Gallipoli Peninsula.
Provintia Lakedemonie, micra et megali episkepsis, i.e. parva et magna providentia. Kalabrita.	the province of Lacedaemonia and the minor and major episkepseis therein, and the town of Kalavryta	Venice	Peloponnese	The province of Lacedaemonia is not otherwise known, but is evidently equivalent to the region of Laconia.
Ostrovos.	the town of Ostrovos	Venice	Western Macedonia	Most likely the namesake town in Macedonia, but also possibly an unknown location of the same name in the Peloponnese.
Oreos. Caristos.	the towns of Oreos and Karystos	Venice	Euboea	Karystos is already mentioned in the 1198 chrysobull, but Oreos, other than being a bishop's seat, was undistinguished at the time.
Andrus.	the island of Andros	Venice	Cyclades	
Egina et Culuris.	the islands of Aegina and Salamis	Venice	Saronic Gulf	The islands of Aegina and Salamis were greatly impoverished and havens for pirates.
Zachintos et Kefalinia.	the islands of Zakynthos and Cephalonia	Venice	Ionian Islands	Cephalonia and Zakynthos had been captured already during the last Norman invasion in 1185, and are usually held to have since then formed a county palatine, initially under Margaritus of Brindisi, and ruled in 1204 by Matthew Orsini. However, Orsini's rule is not based on documentary evidence, but on Karl Hopf's conjectures, and A. Kiesewetter proposes that Maio di Monopoli (alias Matthew Orsini) may have taken control of the islands in 1206 from the Byzantines, who had recovered them since Margaritus's demise in 1294.
Provintia Colonie Conchilari. Canisia.	the province of Koloneia, Kjari or Chlerenon, and Konitsa or Kanina	Venice	Albania, Epirus	Tafel and Thomas proposed a series of emendations and identifications to "Colonie cum Cycladibus. Nisia.", with "Colonie" possibly a reference to the Temple of Poseidon at Sounion (after which Cape Sounion was known as Capo Colonne), "Cycladibus" a reference to the Cyclades, and "Nisia" identified as Naxos island. This was rejected by Th. Menke and Jean Longnon, who emended the text to read "Provintia Colonie cum Chilari, Canisia.", i.e. Koloneia in Epirus, Kjari, and Konitsa, while Dionysios Zakythinos proposed identifying "Chilari" with Chlerenon, and "Canisia" with Kanina.
Pertinentia Lopadi.	the episkepsis of "Lopadi"	Venice	Aegean Islands or Northern Asia Minor (?)	Tafel and Thomas proposed identifying Lopadi as the island of Levitha, but according to Zakythinos it is equally likely to refer to Lopadion in Mysia, which is attested as an episkepsis in the 1198 chrysobull, since portions of the text have evidently been moved around so that they no longer correspond to their original arrangement by geographic proximity. Carile finds the identification with Lopadion less likely, however.
Orium Patron et Methonis, cum omnibus suis, scilicet pertinentiis de Brana. Pertinentia de Cantacuzino, et cum villis Kyreherinis, filie Imperatoris Kyrialexii, cum villis de Molineti, de Pantocratora, et de ceteris monasteriorum, sive quibusdam villis, que sunt in ipsis, scilicet de micra et megali episkepsi, i.e. parva et magna pertinentia.	the horion (Note: A type of subdivision of a theme that appears in the late 12th century exclusively in southern Greece.) of Patras and Methone with its dependencies, namely the estates of the Branas and Kantakouzenos families, the estates of kyra Irene, daughter of Emperor kyr Alexios III, and the estates of "Molineti", of "Pantokrator" and other monasteries	Venice	Peloponnese	The horion of Patras and Methone probably occupied the entire western half of the Peloponnese. The name "Molineti" is evidently associated with windmills; two medieval locations correspond to this, both of them in modern Pylia. The location or identity of "Pantokrator" are unknown.
Nicopolla, cum pertinentia de Arta, de Achello, de Anatolico, de Lesianis, et de ceteris archondorum et monasteriorum.	Nicopolis with the episkepseis of Arta and Achelous, of Anatoliko, Lesiana, "and of other archons and monasteries"	Venice	Epirus	The "other archons" are probably those mentioned in the 1198 chrysobull, namely members of the imperial dynasty: the "most fortunate" sebastokratores and Caesars, the daughters of the Emperor and the Augusta (Euphrosyne Doukaina Kamatera, wife of Alexios III).
Provintia Dirachii et Arbani, cum chartolaratis de Glavinitza, de Bagenetia.	the province of Dyrrhachium and Arbanon, with the chartoularata (Note: A chartoularaton was a special type of fiscal and administrative district, placed under a chartoularios, apparently corresponding with areas of Slavic settlement.) of Glavinitsa and Vagenetia	Venice	Albania	Dyrrhachium was occupied by Venice in 1205 and became the centre of the short-lived "Duchy of Durazzo".
Provintia de Gianina. Provintia Drinopoli.	the provinces of Ioannina and Dryinopolis	Venice	Epirus	
Provintia Achridi.	the province of Ohrid	Venice	Western Macedonia	
Leukas et Coripho.	the islands of Lefkada and Corfu	Venice	Ionian Islands	
A Porta aurea et Blachernali et occidentali Steno usque ad Midiam et Agathopoli. Similiter et ab ipsa civitate Vizoi usque ad Zurlo et Theodoropoli	from the Golden Gate and Blachernae and the western shore of the Bosporus, up to Mideia and Agathopolis on the Black Sea coast. Likewise from Bizye to Tzurulon and Theodoropolis on the Sea of Marmara	Emperor	Eastern Thrace	The points mentioned in the beginning define the circumference of Constantinople, from the main ceremonial gate in the southwestern part of the land walls to the northwestern quarter of Blachernae on the shore of the Golden Horn, and the "Narrows" (Stenon) of the Bosporus.
Provintia Optimati.	the province of Optimatoi	Emperor	Northern Asia Minor	The theme of the Optimatoi encompassed the parts of Asia Minor closest to Constantinople, with Nicomedia as its capital. Its mention apart from Nicomedia in 1204 may be the result of a confusion by the Latin writers, but both the rest of the Partitio and the 1198 chrysobull indicate a breaking up of the province sometime in the 12th century into smaller districts. In 1198, a separate "province of Mesothynia" is mentioned along with the "province of Nicomedia", which is absent in 1204.
Provintia Nicomidie.	the province of Nicomedia	Emperor	Northern Asia Minor	The theme of the Optimatoi encompassed the parts of Asia Minor closest to Constantinople, with Nicomedia as its capital. Its mention apart from Nicomedia in 1204 may be the result of a confusion by the Latin writers, but both the rest of the Partitio and the 1198 chrysobull indicate a breaking up of the province sometime in the 12th century into smaller districts. In 1198, a separate "province of Mesothynia" is mentioned along with the "province of Nicomedia", which is absent in 1204.
Provintia Tharsie, Plusiade, et Metavolis cum Servochoriis, et cum omnibus, que sub ipsis.	the province of Tarsia, Plousias, and Metabole, along with Servochoria and all their dependencies	Emperor	Northern Asia Minor	Tarsia, on the eastern bank of the Sangarios, and Metabole, probably south of Lake Sapanca, historically belonged to the Optimatoi, whereas Plousias to the Bucellarian Theme. The "Servochoria" (Σερβοχώρια) is the area where Emperor John II Komnenos settled the Serbs in 1129/30.
Provintia Paflagonie et Vucellarii.	the province of Paphlagonia and the Bucellarians	Emperor	Northern Asia Minor	The Bucellarian Theme was established c. 768, and Paphlagonia was created as a distinct theme from it sometime in the early 9th century. It is likely that the themes of the Bucellarians and Paphlagonia had been administratively unified—unclear when or for how long—for defensive purposes, a recurrent practice in Byzantine history.
Provintia Oenoei et Sinopii et Pabrei.	Oenoe and Sinope and Pavrae	Emperor	Northern Asia Minor	Formerly part of the Armeniac Theme, these three important coastal cities are often mentioned in conjunction with Turkish raids during the 12th century.
Mitilini.	the island of Lesbos	Emperor	Aegean Islands	
Limni cum Skiro, et que sunt infra Avidum insule, scilicet Priconiso et cetera, cum Strovilo.	the islands of Lemnos and Skyros, and the islands this side of Abydos (i.e., in the Sea of Marmara), namely Proconnesus and the others, with Strobilos	Emperor	Aegean Islands and Sea of Marmara	
Samos et Tinos cum Samandrakio.	the islands of Samos and Tinos with Samothrace	Emperor	Aegean Islands	
Provintia de Pilon, de Pithion, de Keramon.	the province of Pylae, Pythia, and Kerama	Emperor	Asia Minor	In the 1198 chrysobull, the episkepsis of Pylae and Pythia is mentioned, formerly part of the theme of the Optimatoi. The identity and location of Kerama is unknown, unless it is a misspelling for Germia, attested as a toponym in the area of Mysia.
Provintia Malagini.	the province of Malagina	Emperor	Northern Asia Minor	Malagina was the first army assembly point and camp (aplekton) for imperial expeditions in Asia Minor, and the site of major imperial horse farms. It was raised to a distinct administrative unit under the Komnenian emperors, due to its importance and exposure to Turkish raids.
Provintia Achirai.	the province of Achyraous	Emperor	Western Asia Minor	The province is only mentioned in the 1198 chrysobull and Partitio, and probably encompassed the northern part of the Thracesian Theme.
Provintia Adramitii, de Chilariis et de Pergamis.	the province of Adramyttium, Chliara, and Pergamon	Emperor	Western Asia Minor	According to Niketas Choniates, the theme of Neokastra originally encompassed the cities of Adramyttium, Chliara, and Pergamon, after they were refortified by Manuel I Komnenos. However, these cities are mentioned separately from the province both in the 1198 chrysobull and in the Partitio. Helene Ahrweiler interpreted the evidence to suggest that Neokastra did indeed originally encompass the three cities, but that in 1198 Adramyttion may have formed a separate district, and that the separation between the cities and the province evidenced in the Partitio was the result of a copyist's error.
Provintia Neocastron.	the province of Neokastra	Emperor	Western Asia Minor	
Provintia Milasi et Melanudi.	the province of Mylasa and Melanoudion	Emperor	Western Asia Minor	
Provintia Laodikie et Meandri, cum pertinentia Sampson et Samakii, cum Contostephanatis, cum Camizatis et ceteris atque Chio.	the province of Laodicea and the Maeander, with the district of Sampson and Samakion, with the estates of the Kontostephanos and the Kamytzes families and other places, as well as Chios	Emperor	Western Asia Minor and Aegean Islands	Some scholars, including Carile, emend "Samakii" to "ta Malachii", identifying it with the Byzantine village of Malachiou (possibly modern Atburgazı) near Mycale, but as Peter Thonemann points out, the locality of Samakion is mentioned in the Life of St. Lazaros of Galesion.
Provintia micra et megali Brissi.	the province of Little and Great Brysis	Crusaders	Eastern Thrace	
Pertinentia Gehenna.	the episkepsis of Gehenna	Crusaders	Eastern Thrace	
Civitas Panfili, cum omnibus, que sub ipsa.	the city of Pamphylos with all its dependencies	Crusaders	Eastern Thrace	
Pertinentia Culi.	the episkepsis of Koule	Crusaders	Eastern Thrace	The settlement of Koule (Κούλη) is mentioned by Anna Komnene as lying to the east of Pamphylos.
Civitas Apri, cum omnibus, que sub ipsa.	the city of Apros with all its dependencies	Crusaders	Eastern Thrace	
Didimochium, cum omnibus, que sub ipsa.	the city of Didymoteichon with all its dependencies	Crusaders	Eastern Thrace	
Pertinentia de Kipsali/Cypsellam.	the episkepsis of Kypsela	Crusaders	Eastern Thrace	
Pertinentia de Garelli.	the episkepsis of Garella	Crusaders	Eastern Thrace	
Pertinentia de Lebuecho/Lebucto.	the episkepsis of Kedouktos	Crusaders	Eastern Thrace	Tafel and Thomas proposed the emendation to "Ceducto", i.e., the plain of Kedouktos.
Pertinentia de Bira.	the episkepsis of Bera	Crusaders	Eastern Thrace	Bera was chiefly notable for the Theotokos Kosmosoteira Monastery established by the sebastokrator Isaac Komnenos; in the 1150s it was still described as void of people or dwellings.
Pertinentia Macri et Traianopoli, cum casali de Brachon.	the episkepsis of Makri and Trajanopolis, with the settlement of Brachon	Crusaders	Eastern Thrace	The area traditionally belonged to the theme of Macedonia, with Makri lying at the boundary with the theme of Boleron to the west. Brachon is otherwise unknown; as a misreading of "Blachon", it may refer to the Monastery of the Saviour "of Blachon" near Ainos).
Pertinentia Scifis et Pagadi, cum omnibus, que sub ipsa.	the episkepsis of "Scifis" and "Pagadi" with its dependencies	Crusaders	Eastern Thrace	The identification of Scifis and Pagadi (probably from πηγάδι, "well") is disputed. Tafel and others equated Scifis with Tzympe, which then would locate Pagadi between Tzympe and Madytos, while others suggest locating both on the eastern bank of the lower Maritsa river near Ainos. Zakythinos proposed an identification of Scifis with the "village of Sophous" attested in the typikon of the Theotokos Kosmosoteira Monastery.
Pertinentia Maditi, cum omnibus, que sub ipsa.	the episkepsis of Madytos with its dependencies	Crusaders	Thracian Chersonese	
Icalotichas, cum omnibus, que sub ipsa, i.e. Anafartus, Tinsaccos, Iplagia, Potamia et Aacros/Aatios, cum omnibus, que sub ipsa.	Koila Teichos with its dependencies: Anaphartos, Tinsakkos, Plagia, Potamia, and Aatios or Aacros	Crusaders	Thracian Chersonese	Koila Teichos is most likely identifiable with the Long Wall running at the base of the Thracian Chersonese at Agora. Zakythinos proposed an identification with the Anastasian Wall, but this does not fit the geography. The exact identity or locations of Tinsakkos, Potamia, and Aacros/Aatios are unknown, but lay on the Chersonese, just as the remaining locations.
Pertinentia de Phitoto/Plit[h]oto.	the episkepsis of "P[l]ithoto"	Crusaders	Eastern Thrace	Exact location unknown, possibly identical with Polyboton near modern Keşan.
Pertinentia de Galanatom.	the episkepsis of Galataria	Crusaders	Thracian Chersonese?	Exact location unknown, possibly a bishopric and town near Kallipolis.
Molinoto/Moliboton.	the town of Molinoto/Moliboton	Crusaders	Thracian Chersonese?	Exact location unknown, probably on the Thracian Chersonese; earlier suggestions identified it with Polyboton or the small monastery of St. Nicholas near the Golden Gate, but do not fit the context.
Pertinentia de Jalocastelli/Hyalo Castelli.	the episkepsis of Hyelokastellion	Crusaders	Thracian Chersonese?	The name Ὑελοκαστέλλιον means "glass castle". Its exact location is unknown, but is attested as a coastal site during the revolt of Andronikos Lapardas in 1183. Likely on the Thracian Chersonese.
Pertinentia Sirolefki/Sitoleuchi.	the episkepsis of "Sirolefki"	Crusaders	Eastern Thrace	Tafel and Thomas suggested an identification with Silta near Selymbria, but this does not fit the geographical context, which suggests proximity to Ainos.
Catepanikium de Eno, cum apothikis.	the katepanikion of Ainos, along with its warehouses	Crusaders	Eastern Thrace	The warehouses denoted the public warehouses (analogous to the old Roman horrea), managed by the fisc.
Catepanikium de Russa, cum omnibus, que sub ipsa.	the katepanikion of Rusion, with its dependencies	Crusaders	Eastern Thrace	
Pertinentia de Ag[r]iovivario.	the episkepsis of Hagios Bibarios	Crusaders	Eastern Thrace	The name probably derives from agrion bibarion, "wild fish-lake", indicating a location at or near the modern Lake Gala National Park.
Provintia Vardarii.	the province of the Vardar River	Crusaders	Western Macedonia	The province is otherwise unattested. According to Zakythinos, it appears to be related to the Vardariotes, a group of Turkic people, mostly Magyars, settled in the area in previous centuries.
Provintia Verye, cum cartularatis tam Dobrochubisti, quam et Sthlanitza.	the province of Veroia with the chartoularata of Dobrochoubista and Sthlanitsa	Crusaders	Western Macedonia	Tafel and Thomas suggested emending Dobrochubista to Drogubitia, and were followed by some other scholars, but the district is well attested elsewhere, including in the 1198 chrysobull. Sthlanitsa is likewise attested by Anna Komnene and Theophylact of Ohrid.
Pertinentia Girocomion.	the episkepsis allotted to the upkeep of the old-age care homes	Crusaders	Western Macedonia	
Pertinentia Platamonos.	the episkepsis of Platamon	Crusaders	Western Macedonia/Thessaly	
Pertinentia Moliscu et Moglenon.	the episkepsis of Moliskos and Moglena	Crusaders	Western Macedonia	
Pertinentia Prilapi et Pelagonie cum Stano.	the province of Prilapos and Pelagonia with Stanos	Crusaders	Western Macedonia	Stanos as a toponym is well attested and mentioned frequently along with Pelagonia, Prilapos, Soskos, and Moliskos.
Presepe et Dodecanisos.	the province of Prespes and the Cyclades	Crusaders	Western Macedonia and Aegean Islands	The term "Dodekanesos" ("Twelve Islands") first appears in Byzantine sources in the 8th century as a naval command encompassing the southern Aegean Sea. The term remained in use throughout the medieval period for the Cyclades, and only in the 19th/20th centuries became transferred to the modern Dodecanese. Its placement in the text is unusual, lying between areas of continental Greece; perhaps the result of a scribal error or, according to Jean Longnon, a result of a trade, whereby Ostrovos, originally claimed by the Crusaders, and the Cyclades, claimed by Venice, were exchanged (apart from Andros and Tinos), thus explaining the unexpected placement of both entries in the text of the treaty.
Orion Larisse.	the horion of Larissa	Crusaders	Thessaly	
Provintia Blachie cum personalibus et monasterialibus in eis existentibus.	the province of Vlachia with the private and monastic properties existing in it	Crusaders	Thessaly	
Provintia Servion.	the province of Servia	Crusaders	Western Macedonia	
Provintia Castorie et provintia Deavoleos.	the province of Kastoria and the province of Deabolis	Crusaders	Western Macedonia	
Pertinentia Imperatricis, scilicet Vesna, Fersala, Domocos, Revenica, duo Almiri, cum Demetriadi.	the episkepsis of the Empress, namely Vesaina, Pharsala, Domokos, Grebenika or Rebenika, the two Halmyroi, with Demetrias	Crusaders	Thessaly	The Empress is probably Euphrosyne Doukaina Kamatera, wife of Alexios III. Grebenika or Rebenika is probably a location at or near the river Rebenikos, originating in the Cynoscephalae Hills in northern Thessaly.)
Pertinentia Neopatron.	the episkepsis of Neopatras	Crusaders	Thessaly	Not previously mentioned as an administrative unit.
Provintia Velechative/Velicati.	the province of Velechativa	Crusaders	Thessaly	Mentioned in the 1198 chrysobull, tentatively equated with the area of settlement of the Belegezites near Demetrias and Phthiotic Thebes. Zakythinos proposes an additional identification with the toponym of "Levachata", attested in 1289 near Halmyros. The Greek scholar Alkmini Stavridou-Zafraka rejects this identification and proposes an identification with 'Little Vlachia', a Vlach-inhabited region in Aetolia.
Pertinentia Petritoniclis/Petrion Vietts/videlicet. Dipotamon. Cala[n]con/Talantum.	the episkepsis of Petrai, namely Dipotamon and Atalanti?	Crusaders	Thessaly	Tafel and Thomas emend the beginning to read "Petrion. Kelliae.", identifying the former with the Nea Petra Monastery and the latter with the area in Mount Ossa mentioned by Anna Komnene. Zakythinos rejected this reading in favour of the videlicet ("namely") of the Ambrosianus I manuscript. The location of Petrai (plural) is unknown. "Dipotamon" (Διπόταμον, "Two Rivers") may be located between the rivers Pineios and Rabenikos in northern Thessaly, and perhaps to be identified with the kleisoura (defile) of Libotanion, known from the time of Alexios I Komnenos. Tafel and Thomas identify Calacon as the genitive of Galaza, a suffragan of the Metropolis of Neopatras, while Zakythinos suggests either the reading Kalamos, or, from the variant "Talantum" in the Codex Sancti Marci, Atalanti.
Pazi/Pazima et Radovisidon, et orium Athenarum, cum pertinentia Megarum.	Pazi/Pazima and Radobisdion, and the horion of Athens, with the episkepsis of Megara	Crusaders	Thessaly and Attica	The identity and location of Pazi/Pazima are unknown. Tafel and Thomas suggest the town and bishopric of Stagoi in Thessaly, while Carile suggested the bishopric of Patzouna, known only as a suffragan of the Metropolis of Larissa.

=== Observations ===
Based on the forms of the names, the source material for the compilation of the treaty was in Greek, while the prevalence of fiscal terms like episkepsis points to the use of the cadastral and tax registers of the central Byzantine administration.

Several areas are left out of the Partitio. In Europe, the lands of Macedonia and Western Thrace, between the Maritsa and Vardar rivers, as well as the northeastern Peloponnese, Boeotia, and central Euboea, are absent. These were lands assigned to Boniface of Montferrat, and thus evidently excluded from the general partition. This fact also helps to assign the terminus post quem for the treaty, namely the agreement of 16 May 1204 between Boniface and Baldwin of Flanders that established the Kingdom of Thessalonica.

As Zakythinos points out, the territorial division shown in the Partitio and in the 1198 chrysobull for Asia Minor is much more conservative, and reflects far closer the "traditional" thematic structure than in the European provinces. On the other hand, the two documents differ considerably in the extent of territory they mention: the 1198 chrysobull contains the central and northern portions of western Asia Minor, but also the southern shore with Attaleia, Cilicia, and even Antioch, whereas in the Partitio, includes the Black Sea shore from Paphlagonia up to Pavrae.

== Impact ==
=== Fragmentation of the Greek world ===
The Partitio Romaniae initiated the period of the history of Greece known as Frankokratia or Latinokratia ("Frankish/Latin rule"), where Catholic West European nobles, mostly from France and Italy, established states on former Byzantine territory and ruled over the mostly Orthodox native Byzantine Greeks. The provisions of the Partitio Romaniae were not fully carried out; much of the Byzantine realm fell into the hands not of the crusaders who had sacked the capital but of the local Byzantine Greek nobles, who established the Byzantine successor states of the Despotate of Epirus, the Empire of Nicaea and the Empire of Trebizond, while the Crusaders also squabbled among themselves. The Latin Empire itself, consisting of the area surrounding Constantinople, Thrace, and the Sea of Marmara was also drawn into a disastrous conflict with the powerful Second Bulgarian Empire. Latin rule became most firmly established and lasted longest in southern Greece (the Principality of Achaea and the Duchy of Athens), as well as the Aegean islands, which came largely under the control of Venice.

=== Venice ===
Through the treaty of partition and the constitutional agreements that accompanied it, Venice became the chief power in Latin Romania, and the effective power behind the Latin Empire: placed in a position of parity with the Emperor and involved in the Empire's governance, it was at the same time able to pursue its own interests as a sovereign power irrespective of the Emperor. While the Crusader barons received their fiefs from the Latin Emperor and were thus bound to provide him fealty and assistance, no such restriction was placed on the Venetian portions of the Empire. This was clearly illustrated by the lofty title that the Doge of Venice acquired, beginning with Dandolo's successor, Pietro Ziani: Dominator quartae et dimidiae partis totius Romaniae ("Lord of a quarter and a half quarter of all of Romania"), while Venice's local proconsul, the Podestà of Constantinople, used the quasi-imperial Byzantine title of despotes to emphasize his near-equality with the Latin Emperor.

== Importance as a historical source ==
As the division was based on now lost documents and tax registers from the Byzantine imperial chancery, along with Alexios III's 1198 chrysobull, the Partitio Romaniae is a crucial document for the administrative divisions of the Byzantine Empire and the estates of the various Byzantine magnate families c. 1203, as well as the areas still controlled by the Byzantine central government at the time.

== Sources ==
- Brand, C. M. (1991). "Partitio Romaniae". In Kazhdan, Alexander (ed.). The Oxford Dictionary of Byzantium. Oxford and New York: Oxford University Press. pp. 1591–1592. ISBN 0-19-504652-8.
- Carile, A. (1965). "Partitio terrarum imperii Romanie". Studi Veneziani. 7: 125–305.
- Hendrickx, Benjamin (2015). "Les duchés de l'Empire latin de Constantinople après 1204: origine, structures et statuts" [The Duchies of the Latin Empire of Constantinople after 1204. Origin, Structures and Statutes]. Revue belge de philologie et d'histoire (in French). 93 (2): 303–328. doi:10.3406/rbph.2015.8837.
- Jacoby, David (2006). "The Venetian Government and Administration in Latin Constantinople, 1204–1261: A State within a State". In Gherardo Ortalli; Giorgio Ravegnani; Peter Schreiner (eds.). Quarta Crociata. Venezia - Bisanzio - Impero latino. Atti delle giornate di studio. Venezia, 4-8 maggio 2004. Venice: Istituto veneto di scienze, lettere ed arti. pp. 19–79. ISBN 978-8-8881-4374-3.
- Kiesewetter, Andreas (2006). "Preludio alla Quarta Crociata? Megareites di Brindisi, Maio di Cefalonia e la signoria sulle isole ionie (1185-1250)". In Gherardo Ortalli; Giorgio Ravegnani; Peter Schreiner (eds.). Quarta Crociata. Venezia - Bisanzio - Impero latino. Atti delle giornate di studio. Venezia, 4-8 maggio 2004 (in Italian). Venice: Istituto veneto di scienze, lettere ed arti. pp. 317–358. ISBN 978-8-8881-4374-3.
- Koder, Johannes; Hild, Friedrich (1976). Tabula Imperii Byzantini, Band 1: Hellas und Thessalia (in German). Vienna: Verlag der Österreichischen Akademie der Wissenschaften. ISBN 978-3-7001-0182-6.
- Külzer, Andreas (2008). Tabula Imperii Byzantini, Band 12: Ostthrakien (Eurōpē) (in German). Vienna: Verlag der Österreichischen Akademie der Wissenschaften. ISBN 978-3-7001-3945-4.
- Madden, Thomas F. (2003). Enrico Dandolo and the Rise of Venice. Baltimore: Johns Hopkins University Press. ISBN 0-8018-7317-7.
- Maksimović, Ljubomir (1988). The Byzantine Provincial Administration under the Palaiologoi. Amsterdam: Adolf M. Hakkert. ISBN 978-90-256-0968-9.
- Nicol, Donald M. (1988). Byzantium and Venice: A Study in Diplomatic and Cultural Relations. Cambridge: Cambridge University Press. ISBN 0-521-34157-4.
- Oikonomidès, Nicolas (1992) [1976]. "La décomposition de l'empire byzantin à la veille de 1204 et les origines de l'empire de Nicée : à propos de la « Partitio Romaniae »". Byzantium from the Ninth Century to the Fourth Crusade: Studies, Texts, Monuments (in French). Aldershot. pp. 3–28. ISBN 978-0860783213.
- Marin, Şerban (2004). "Dominus quartae partis et dimidiae totius imperii Romaniae: The Fourth Crusade and the Dogal Title in the Venetian Chronicles' Representation". Quaderni della Casa Romena di Venezia. 3: 119–150.
- Soustal, Peter; Koder, Johannes (1981). Tabula Imperii Byzantini, Band 3: Nikopolis und Kephallēnia (in German). Vienna: Verlag der Österreichischen Akademie der Wissenschaften. ISBN 978-3-7001-0399-8.
- Soustal, Peter (1991). Tabula Imperii Byzantini, Band 6: Thrakien (Thrakē, Rodopē und Haimimontos) (in German). Vienna: Verlag der Österreichischen Akademie der Wissenschaften. ISBN 978-3-7001-1898-5.
- Tafel, Gottlieb Lukas Friedrich; Thomas, Georg Martin (1856). Urkunden zur älteren Handels- und Staatsgeschichte der Republik Venedig, mit besonderer Beziehung auf Byzanz und die Levante: Vom neunten bis zum Ausgang des fünfzehnten Jahrhunderts. 1. Theil (814–1205). Vienna: Kaiserlich-Königliche Hof- und Staatsdruckerei.
- Thonemann, Peter (2011). The Maeander Valley: A Historical Geography from Antiquity to Byzantium. Cambridge: Cambridge University Press. ISBN 978-1-107-00688-1.
- Zakythinos, Dionysios (1941). "Μελέται περὶ τῆς διοικητικῆς διαιρέσεως καὶ τῆς ἐπαρχιακῆς διοικήσεως ἐν τῷ Βυζαντινῷ κράτει" [Studies on the administrative division and provincial administration in the Byzantine state]. Ἐπετηρίς Ἐταιρείας Βυζαντινῶν Σπουδῶν (in Greek). 17: 208–274. hdl:11615/19494.
- Zakythinos, Dionysios (1948). "Μελέται περὶ τῆς διοικητικῆς διαιρέσεως καὶ τῆς ἐπαρχιακῆς διοικήσεως ἐν τῷ Βυζαντινῷ κράτει" [Studies on the administrative division and provincial administration in the Byzantine state]. Ἐπετηρίς Ἐταιρείας Βυζαντινῶν Σπουδῶν (in Greek). 18: 42–62. hdl:11615/16537.
- Zakythinos, Dionysios (1949). "Μελέται περὶ τῆς διοικητικῆς διαιρέσεως καὶ τῆς ἐπαρχιακῆς διοικήσεως ἐν τῷ Βυζαντινῷ κράτει" [Studies on the administrative division and provincial administration in the Byzantine state]. Ἐπετηρίς Ἐταιρείας Βυζαντινῶν Σπουδῶν (in Greek). 19: 3–25. hdl:11615/20690.
- Zakythinos, Dionysios (1951). "Μελέται περὶ τῆς διοικητικῆς διαιρέσεως καὶ τῆς ἐπαρχιακῆς διοικήσεως ἐν τῷ Βυζαντινῷ κράτει" [Studies on the administrative division and provincial administration in the Byzantine state]. Ἐπετηρίς Ἐταιρείας Βυζαντινῶν Σπουδῶν (in Greek). 21: 179–209. hdl:11615/15383.
- Zakythinos, Dionysios (1952). "Μελέται περὶ τῆς διοικητικῆς διαιρέσεως καὶ τῆς ἐπαρχιακῆς διοικήσεως ἐν τῷ Βυζαντινῷ κράτει" [Studies on the administrative division and provincial administration in the Byzantine state]. Ἐπετηρίς Ἐταιρείας Βυζαντινῶν Σπουδῶν (in Greek). 22: 159–182.
- Zakythinos, Dionysios (1955). "Μελέται περὶ τῆς διοικητικῆς διαιρέσεως καὶ τῆς ἐπαρχιακῆς διοικήσεως ἐν τῷ Βυζαντινῷ κράτει" [Studies on the administrative division and provincial administration in the Byzantine state]. Ἐπετηρίς Ἐταιρείας Βυζαντινῶν Σπουδῶν (in Greek). 25: 127–157.
