= Panium =

Panium, an ancient name in honour of the god Pan, may refer to:

- Banias, an ancient site in the Israeli-occupied Golan Heights
- Panion, a city in Eastern Thrace, modern Barbaros
- Battle of Panium, a conflict in 200 BC

== See also ==
- Paneion (disambiguation)
