= Panion =

Ancient town on the Sea of Marmara

Coordinates: 40°54′26″N 27°28′01″E

Panion (Greek: Πάνιον) or Panias (Πανιάς), in early Byzantine times known as Theodosiopolis (Θεοδοσιούπολις) and in later Byzantine and Ottoman times Panidos (Greek: Πάνιδος, Turkish: Banıdoz), was a town in Eastern Thrace on the coast of the Marmara Sea, on the site of the modern settlement of Barbaros in Tekirdağ Province, Turkey.

== History ==
The settlement dates to antiquity, perhaps founded by the Thracians. Known as Panion, Panias, or Panis ("place dedicated to Pan") in antiquity.

=== Early and middle Byzantine periods ===
The city walls were restored sometime between 383 and 403, and shortly after, in c. 410–420, the historian Priscus was born in the city. At around the same time the city was officially renamed to Theodosiopolis, and the name was used in tandem with Panion for some time thereafter. The "bishop of new Theodosiopolis" (episcopus novae Theodosiopolis) Babylas addressed a letter to Emperor Leo I the Thracian (r. 457–474) on the saint Proterius of Alexandria. In the 6th-century Synecdemus, Panion is listed as one of the cities of the Roman province of Europa. In the 536 Synod of Constantinople, Andreas, the "bishop of the Paniots, that is the Theodosiopolitans", took part. The name of Theodosiopolis apparently survived until the middle Byzantine period, as a—now lost—border marker with the inscription kastron Theodospolis is known from the 8th/10th century.

A bishop Justin is known from an inscription of the 6th/7th centuries, Reginus participated in the Third Council of Constantinople in 680, and John in the Second Council of Nicaea in 787. In 813, the town was one of the few settlements that were able to successfully resist the invasion of the Bulgarian ruler Krum, due to its strong and well-maintained fortifications and the numerous inhabitants, who assisted in the defence. During the subsequent rebellion of Thomas the Slav in 820, the city sided with the rebel, and along with neighbouring Heraclea continued resisting the forces of Emperor Michael II the Amorian even after Thomas' death in October 823. Only after the city walls were damaged by an earthquake in February 824, did the inhabitants of the two cities surrender. Repairs to the city on Imperial orders are attested in an inscription variously dated to 824/829 or 842/856. Another inscription, dated to the 9th century but possibly earlier, mentions repairs undertaken by the bishop Theodore.

A number of lead seals from the 9th–12th centuries attest to the existence of a bishop Acindynus (9th/10th century), an archpriest Michael (10th/11th century), an unnamed archon of the town (10th century), the bishops John and Paul (11th century), the oikonomos Leo (11th/12th century), and the bishop Constantine Manasses, possibly the historian of the same name. A gravestone dated 27 February 965 mentions a Basil Diakonos, who founded a church dedicated to the Holy Unmercenaries, probably in the town. A great earthquake in September 1063 damaged the city. In 1096, the First Crusade passed by the city on its way across the Balkans to Constantinople. A few years later, the town was visited by the English pilgrim Sæwulf, on his return from the Holy Land. In 1136, two estates in the town, owned by the Triakontaphyllos family, belonged to the Pantokrator Monastery. The 12th-century traveller and geographer al-Idrisi visited the city of (Banedhos) in the middle of the century, and praised its spacious streets and its shops.

=== Latin rule, late Byzantine period and the Ottoman conquest ===
In the Partitio Romaniae of 1204, Panion is recorded as belonging to the episkepsis of Chalcis, and came under Venetian control. However, the town tried to oppose the Latins, and the Venetians launched a punitive expedition that plundered the city in 1205. In the next year, the city was entirely destroyed by the Bulgarian ruler Kaloyan, who resettled many of its inhabitants on the banks of the Danube. It is unknown when the city was resettled. Under Latin rule, a Roman Catholic bishop resided in Panion (Panadensem), attested since 1208.

With the decline and conquest of the Latin Empire by the Empire of Nicaea, Panion came again under Byzantine control and the see was restored to Greek Orthodox control. The town was probably occupied by the Catalan Company in 1306–1307, and its bishop was accused by Patriarch Athanasius I of Constantinople of collaborating with them. Bishop Ignatius is attested in 1351–1368, during which time the area fell to the Ottoman Turks; Panion itself was occupied without resistance by the future sultan Murad I in 1359. In 1382, Emperor John V Palaiologos ceded the town, along with Heraclea, Rhaidestos, and Selymbria, to his son Andronikos IV Palaiologos and his grandson John VII Palaiologos. It is unclear whether the Byzantines had retaken it in the meantime, as this is not mentioned in the sources, and it is possible that this deed represented a nominal transfer of territories not actually under Byzantine control at the time. The town was returned to Byzantine control in the 1403 Treaty of Gallipoli, but some Turkish troops may have remained garrisoned there. At any rate, the town was quickly lost again, perhaps as early as the 1410s. The town is most frequently mentioned during this time as a place of shipment of grain, particularly for supplying Constantinople.

The settlement remained predominantly Greek-populated under Ottoman rule, numbering 1,748 Greek inhabitants as late as 1922.

=== Notable people ===
- Priscus, historian

== Sources ==
- Külzer, Andreas (2008). Tabula Imperii Byzantini: Band 12, Ostthrakien (Eurōpē) (in German). Vienna: Österreichische Akademie der Wissenschaften. ISBN 978-3-7001-3945-4.
- Treadgold, Warren T. (1988). The Byzantine Revival, 780–842. Stanford, California: Stanford University Press. ISBN 0-8047-1462-2.
