= Kedouktos =

Byzantine-era plain in Turkey

Kedouktos (Greek: Κηδούκτος) or Kedoktos (Κηδόκτος), also Akedoukton (Ἀκεδοῦκτον) and ta Kidoktou (τὰ Κιδόκτου), was a plain near Herakleia Perinthos in Byzantine times.

The location of Kedouktos has not been identified with any certainty, but it lay near the river Halmyros (modern Kalivri Dere), and between the towns of Daneion (modern Kınalıköprü) and Herakleia (modern Marmara Ereğlisi). The name is evidently a hellenization of the Latin aquaeductus and refers to a local aqueduct; despite its vicinity with it, it was probably not part of the great system that supplied the Byzantine capital, Constantinople.

The site is first mentioned in 813 as Akedoukton or ta Kidoktou, when Michael I Rhangabe campaigned against the Bulgars, and was escorted by his wife Prokopia. Her presence was unwelcome to the troops, who rioted. In October or November 822, the plain was the site of the decisive battle in the rebellion of Thomas the Slav, between the rebel forces and the Bulgars under Omurtag, who was allied to Emperor Michael II the Amorian. The battle was costly for both sides and resulted in no clear winner, but weakened Thomas, leading to the collapse of his rebellion in spring 823.

The site appears again during the rebellion of Nikephoros Bryennios the Elder against Nikephoros III Botaneiates in 1078. Shortly before the Battle of Kalavrye, where Bryennios was defeated by Botaneiates' general Alexios Komnenos, the rebel army had camped at Kedouktos. In a praktikon of 1104, it is listed among the possessions of the Iviron Monastery on Mount Athos. At the turn of the 13th century it formed an imperial episkepsis, and was recorded in the Partitio Romaniae ("pertinentia Cedocti") as one of the areas allotted to the individual Crusader knights.

== Sources ==
- Külzer, Andreas (2008). Tabula Imperii Byzantini, Band 12: Ostthrakien (Eurōpē) (in German). Vienna: Verlag der Österreichischen Akademie der Wissenschaften. ISBN 978-3-7001-3945-4.
- Treadgold, Warren T. (1988). The Byzantine Revival, 780–842. Stanford, California: Stanford University Press. ISBN 0-8047-1462-2.
