= Scylla (Thrace) =

Town of ancient Thrace

Coordinates: 41°38′14″N 28°05′28″E

Scylla or Scyllae was a town of ancient Thrace, on the Euxine, where the long wall, erected by the emperor Anastasius I Dicorus for the defence of Constantinople, terminated. This wall commenced at Selymbria, on the Propontis, and was carried across the narrow part of Thrace, at the distance of about 40 miles (64 km) from Constantinople, its length being 2 days' journey.

Its site is located near Podima, Yalıköy in European Turkey.
