= Gothograecia =

Historical region in northwestern Asia Minor

Gothograecia (Greek: Γοτθογραικία, romanized: Gotthograikia) or Gothia (Greek: Γοτθία, romanized: Gotthia) was a region in northwestern Asia Minor on the south side of the Sea of Marmara from at least the late 7th century until the mid-10th. It was part of the province of Opsikion in the Byzantine Empire. Its inhabitants, the Greek-speaking descendants of a group of Goths, were known as Gothograeci (Γοτθογραίκοι, Gotthograikoi), whose exact origin is disputed.

== Origins ==
There is only one reference to the settlement of Goths in Asia Minor. The Greuthungian Goths under King Odotheus, defeated by the Romans along the lower Danube in 386, were subsequently settled in Phrygia, where they rapidly intermarried with the Phrygians. The Phrygian Goths and Thracian Goths appear to have played a small part in the factional fighting between Arians and Eunomians in and around Constantinople in the 380s. Selenas, bishop of the Goths on the Danube, had a Gothic father and Phrygian mother. In the past the Phrygian Goths were often linked to the later Gothograeci, but this theory is not widely held today.

The elite unit of the Optimates, first attested in the late 6th century under the Emperor Maurice, is sometimes thought to have its origins in the Goths of Radagaisus defeated by Stilicho in 406. According to Olympiodorus, Stilicho recruited a large number, called Optimates, to serve in the Roman army. These Gothic Optimates are thought to have been settled in Asia Minor, giving their name to Gothograecia and the later thema (province) of Optimaton. This is unlikely, however, since it requires soldiers recruited in the west to have settled far to the east, and there is a gap in the records of the Gothic Optimates of well over a hundred years.

The Byzantinist John Haldon argues that, while the original Maurician Optimates were predominantly recruited mainly from among the Goths and to a lesser extent Lombards in Italy and the Balkans, they and their families were only settled in Mysia in the early 7th century under Emperor Tiberius Constantine and are unrelated to the Goths of Radagaisus of two centuries earlier. Thus, Optimates and Gothograeci are originally synonyms. They were Arian Christians and had an Arian church in Constantinople under Tiberius. Popular opposition to their presence in the capital probably hastened their resettlement in Mysia. They may only have been permanently re-settled in the second half of the 7th century. By the time the term Gothograeci appears in the sources, the ethnic Gothic element among the population may have been "diluted to the extent that only the name had any connection" to the Goths of old. This thesis is considered as "very uncertain" by historian Klaus Belke.

In the 8th century, the Gothograeci were the leading element of the thematic army of Opsikion, although they may have still belonged to the Optimaton until the reorganization of Constantine V (r. 741–775). Moving the Gothograeci, still renowned for the martial skill, from the Optimaton to the Opsikion may be responsible for the downgrading of the former to a logistical rather than fighting unit. It was probably punitive also for the Gothograeci, who lost prestige when incorporated into a thema that already included other elite units. This was probably because they were regarded as a threat to the capital owing to their proximity and their participation in a rebellion in 715. It is also probably only with Constantine V's reform that the Optimates' presence in Constantinople is brought to an end (and hence that of the Gothograeci as well).

== Attestations ==
Writing in the final years of the seventh or first half of the eighth century, Cosmas of Jerusalem provides the earliest evidence of a region called Gothia in Asia Minor. In passage describing the portage of boats across the Thracian Chersonese, he locates the land of Gothia opposite Thrace along the southern shore of the Sea of Marmara and the Dardanelles, near the city of Lampsacus. Its inhabitants he calls Goths:

For there is a place next to Thrace, dry land six miles wide standing between [two] seas. From there, Thrace is easily accessible to the Goths and Gothia to the Thracians. And the Goths get on their ships—they are made from a single trunk (μονόξυλοι, monoxyloi)–and cross to Thrace, while the Thracians often drag their ships through there towards Gothia overland.

The language of this passage suggests that the Gothic ethnic identity of the Gothograeci was still current in the 670s or even into the 8th century. The next source to mention the Goths of Asia Minor is Theophanes the Confessor, writing around 815. He says some soldiers of the Opsikion thema launched a rebellion on Rhodes in 715 and then, crossing to Adramyttion, were joined by the rest of the army of Opsikion and the Gothograeci. The rebels, including the Gothograeci, entered Constantinople, where they did much damage to life and property. This account is consistent with that of Cosmas in placing Gothograecia on the northern coast of Opsikion. The Patriarch Nikephoros I, in describing the same rebellion, does not mention the Gothograeci. If the rebels' choice of emperor, Theodosios III, was the son of the deposed Tiberios III, as has been argued, that fact may explain the participation of the Gothograeci in the revolt, since Tiberios' birth name was Apsimar, a possibly Gothic (but more probably Turkic) name.

There is a surviving early 8th-century lead seal of a certain Theodore, described as holding the court rank of silentiarios and the post of dioiketes (fiscal supervisor) of the Gothograeci. This shows that the Gothograeci constituted a fiscal unit as well as a military one around the time of the rebellion.

In 844 or 845, Archbishop George of Mytilene is said to have spent two stormy days and nights at sea sailing from Lesbos to Gothograecia. This account is found in the Life of George and his saintly brothers David the Monk and Symeon the Stylite, which was probably compiled in the 11th century. The location of Gothograecia is not entirely clear from the text. On a certain reading of the text, Gothograecia is on or near Lesbos. On the other hand, it may be read as saying that George sailed to Lesbos to attend to a friend who hailed from Gothograecia. On any reading, Gothograecia is not far from Lesbos.

The next reference to the Gothograeci is of little historical value except as an attestation of the existence of a people of this name. In the early 10th century, Arethas of Caesarea wrote a commentary on the Book of Revelation in which he identifies Gog and Magog with the Scythian peoples, who are constantly warring among themselves and fleeing for refuge to the Roman Empire. He seeks to identify various places and peoples within the empire as the product of Scythian refugees, among them Scythopolis in Palestine, a division of Goths that settled in Asia and their military formation, the Thaifali and the Gothograeci. The last two groups, he says, are also called Huns. Arethas distinguishes between the Goths and the Gothograeci, but since he is collecting references from literary sources it is not clear what significance should be attached to this. The reference to the Taifals, some of whom were settled in Phrygia late in the 4th century, led Gustav Anrich to suggest that they were the original Gothograeci.

A reference to the Gothograeci occurs in Constantine VII's De Thematibus (c. 950). In its description of the thema of Opsikion, a people called Graikoi (Γραικοί) are said to inhabit the coast near Cyzicus. Their name is said to be derived from the river Granicus. This apparent corruption of the name Gothograeci demonstrates that by this date it held no ethnic significance. Constantine's place called the Dagotthenon (τῶν Δαγοτθηνῶν) north of Prusa is probably not Goth-related, but reflects the conflation of the name of the region of Dagouta with that of Gothograecia. A late reference that preserves the name can be found in Anna Comnena's Alexiad (c. 1148), where she locates a placed called the Kotoiraikias (τῆς Κοτοιραικίας) in the Lentiana, a district to the south of Cyzicus. This name is clearly derived from Gothograecia.

On the basis of all the evidence, Constantin Zuckerman suggests that the most likely location for Gothograecia was between Lampsacus and Cyzicus, a view followed by Belke in the Tabula Imperii Byzantini volume on Bithynia. John Haldon identifies it simply as Mysia, littoral Bithynia and a part of Phyrgia.

== Bibliography ==
- Abrahamse, Dorothy; Domingo-Forasté, Douglas (1998). "Life of Sts. David, Symeon, and George of Lesbos". In Alice-Mary Talbot (ed.). Byzantine Defenders of Images: Eight Saints' Lives in English Translation. Washington, DC: Dumbarton Oaks Research Library and Collection. pp. 143–242.
- Belke, Klaus (2020). Tabula Imperii Byzantini, Band 13: Bithynia und Hellespontos (in German). Vienna: Verlag der Österreichischen Akademie der Wissenschaften. ISBN 978-3-7001-8329-7.
- Brubaker, Leslie; Haldon, John F. (2011). Byzantium in the Iconoclast Era, c. 680–850: A History. Cambridge University Press.
- Haldon, John F. (1984). Byzantine Praetorians: An Administrative, Institutional and Social Survey of the Opsikion and Tagmata, c. 580–900. Bonn: Dr. Rudolf Habelt GmbH.
- Haldon, John F. (1995). "Kosmas of Jerusalem and the Gotthograikoi". Byzantinoslavica. 56 (1): 45–54.
- Haldon, John F.; Kennedy, Hugh (2012). "Regional Identities and Military Power: Byzantium and Islam, ca. 600–750". In Walter Pohl; Clemens Gantner; Richard Payne (eds.). Visions of Community in the Post-Roman World: The West, Byzantium and the Islamic World, 300–1100. Ashgate. pp. 317–353.
- Hasluck, F. W. (1910). Cyzicus. Cambridge University Press.
- Zuckerman, Constantin (1995). "A Gothia in the Hellespont in the Early Eighth Century". Byzantine and Modern Greek Studies. 19 (1): 234–241. doi:10.1179/030701395790836649. S2CID 162205022.
