= Beodizo =

Settlement and station (mutatio) of ancient Thrace

Coordinates: 41°05′13″N 27°49′29″E

Beodizo was a settlement and station (mutatio) of ancient Thrace, inhabited during Byzantine times.

Its site is located 9 miles (14 km) northwest of Perinthus in European Turkey.
