= Aetolofos, Larissa =

Aetolofos Αετόλοφος
- Community
- Location within Greece
- Coordinates: 39°41.2′N 22°43.5′E
- Country: Greece
- Administrative region: Thessaly
- Regional unit: Larissa
- Municipality: Agia
- Municipal unit: Agia

Area
  - Community: 13.534 km^{2} (5.226 sq mi)
- Elevation: 100 m (330 ft)

Population (2021)
  - Community: 253
  - Density: 18.7/km^{2} (48.4/sq mi)
- Time zone: UTC+2 (EET)
  - Summer (DST): UTC+3 (EEST)
- Postal code: 400 03
- Area code: +30-2494
- Vehicle registration: PI
- Website: www.aetolofos.gr

Aetolofos (Greek: Αετόλοφος, Greek pronunciation: [ae'tolofos]) is a village and a community of the Agia municipality. Before the 2011 local government reform it was a part of the municipality of Agia. The community of Aetolofos covers an area of 13.534 km^{2}.

== History ==
In the Middle Ages, the settlement was known as Vesaina (Βέσαινα), which in the corrupted form Desiani (Δέσιανη) continued until the early 20th century. Vesaina is first attested in the 11th century, as a bishopric and in an inscription found in Agia of a certain Euthymios, "protospatharios of Vesaina". A letter of Michael Psellos mentions the bishopric as being very poor.

In the late 12th century, the traveller Benjamin of Tudela encountered a hundred-strong Jewish community in the town (Bissena). In the imperial chrysobull granted to Venice in 1198 by Alexios III Angelos, Vesaina is listed as a distinct fiscal district or episkepsis, while in the Partitio Romaniae of 1204, it is listed as belonging to the episkepsis of the Empress Euphrosyne Doukaina Kamatera (pertinentia Imperatricis). This pertinentia Imperatricis was awarded to Boniface of Montferrat's widow, Margaret of Hungary, by the Latin Emperor Henry of Flanders, an act confirmed by Pope Innocent III in 1210. When the Metropolitan of Larissa visited the place in 1222, he described it as "well-watered and full of all goods".

About 1.5 km from the modern village lies the abandoned village of Vathyrema, where there are also traces of a Byzantine-era settlement, and a church dedicated to St. Nicholas.

The Swedish orientalist and traveller Jakob Jonas Björnståhl visited the village in 1779, reporting that the "Greek village of Dessen, in Turkish Büyükköy", had a hundred houses and four churches. In 1791, the Greek scholar Grigorios Konstantas, in his landmark Geographia Neoteriki, mentioned "Dessen" (Δεσσέν) as a Christian-inhabited village with 150 houses, located on the plain, south of Agia. Almost all the inhabitants are peasants (zeugitai), with a few weavers (yfantades). Primary products were wheat, sheep, and a little silk. At about that time, the powerful Ali Pasha of Ioannina, who was put in charge of security in the area as derven-agha, made the previously free village over to his son Veli Pasha as a chiflik. The English traveller William Martin Leake, who visited the area in 1809, describes the mansion erected in the village by Veli Pasha, who preferred to reside there rather than his official seat at Larissa, where the climate was not to his liking. Veli's rule lasted until 1819, when Ali Pasha was deposed by the Sublime Porte and his properties and those of his children confiscated.

The area became part of Greece with the rest of Thessaly in 1881, leading to the departure of the Ottoman great landholders and their replacement by Greek ones. In the early 20th century, Greek refugees from Eastern Rumelia were resettled in the area and received land.

== Episcopal see ==
The Greek Orthodox bishopric of Vesaina is attested in the Notitiae Episcopatuum of the Patriarchate of Constantinople from the 11th to the 15th century, as a suffragan of the Metropolitan see of Larissa, ranking 18th among the sees subject to it. After the Frankish conquest, a Roman Catholic prelate was briefly established in the see (Vessinensis episcopus).

The current Church of the Dormition of the Theotokos lies on the ruins of an early Christian or Byzantine basilica. Several Byzantine spolia are incorporated in the present structure, along with the synthronon of the old episcopal cathedral, which permitted the secure identification of Aetolofos as Vesaina.

== Population ==
Historical population
Year	Pop.	±%
2001	378	—
2011	323	−14.6%
2021	253	−21.7%

== See also ==
- List of settlements in the Larissa regional unit
