= İnecik, Tekirdağ =

İnecik
- Neighbourhood
- Location in Turkey İnecik (Marmara)
- Coordinates: 40°56′07″N 27°16′52″E
- Country: Turkey
- Province: Tekirdağ
- District: Süleymanpaşa
- Population (2022): 586
- Time zone: UTC+3 (TRT)
- Postal code: 59070
- Area code: 0282

İnecik is a neighbourhood of the municipality and district of Süleymanpaşa, Tekirdağ Province, Turkey. Its population is 586 (2022). Its Ottoman-era name was Aynadjik, and its Byzantine-era name was Chalcis (Greek: Χαλκίς).

== History ==
On account of its location, it is possible that the town is to be identified with the way-station (mutatio) of Bedizum, listed in the late Roman Itinerarium Burdigalense, and/or the station Bitenas.

Chalcis is first attested as a bishopric in the Second Council of Nicaea in 787, which was attended by its iconophile bishop, Sissinios. Another bishop, named Demetrios, is attested through a lead seal dating to the 8th or 9th centuries, and in the 9th century a droungarios named Staurakios or Theophylact. However, the see does not appear in the Notitiae Episcopatuum of the Patriarchate of Constantinople until the reign of Leo VI the Wise (r. 886–912).

In 1051, a Pecheneg invasion was defeated near the town. In the Partitio Romaniae, the town is listed as part of an episkepsis along with Rhaidestos and Panion.

In Ottoman times, the settlement was named Aynadjik (Αϊναρτζίκ for the local Greek population), and was visited by the traveller Evliya Çelebi, who described it as lying in a wide and fruitful plain with tile-roofed houses. Kara Piri Pasha made several donations there. In c. 1839, the local agriculture is reported as following a two-year cycle of cultivation followed by pasture. The village remained predominantly Greek-populated until the population exchange between Greece and Turkey in 1923; on its eve, in 1922, there were 1,092 Greeks.

== Monuments ==
The town's old mosque (Eski Camii) features four Byzantine-era columns, and its forecourt and garden feature other early and middle Byzantine-era architectural fragments.

== Titular see ==
The diocese of Chalcis was nominally restored in 1933 as a titular see (Chalcis in Europa) by the Roman Catholic Church, but has remained vacant since.

== Sources ==
- Külzer, Andreas (2008). Tabula Imperii Byzantini: Band 12, Ostthrakien (Eurōpē) (in German). Vienna: Österreichische Akademie der Wissenschaften. ISBN 978-3-7001-3945-4.
