= Bitenas =

Settlement and station (mutatio) of ancient Thrace

Coordinates: 40°56′12″N 27°16′51″E

Bitenas was a settlement and station (mutatio) of ancient Thrace, inhabited during Byzantine times.

Its site is located near İnecik in European Turkey.
