= Paphlagonia (theme) =

Province of the Byzantine Empire

Theme of Paphlagonia Παφλαγονία, θέμα Παφλαγονίας
- Theme of the Byzantine Empire
- c. 820–1071 c. 1130s–1380
- The Asian themes of the Byzantine Empire c. 842
- Capital: Gangra; Kastamon
- Historical era: Middle Ages
  - Established: c. 820
  - Fall to the Seljuks: c. 1078
  - Byzantine recovery: 1130s
  - Fall to the Turks.: c. 1380
- Today part of: Turkey

The Theme of Paphlagonia (Greek: θέμα Παφλαγονίας) was a military-civilian province (thema or theme) of the Byzantine Empire in the namesake region along the northern coast of Anatolia, in modern Turkey.

== History ==
The theme of Paphlagonia and its governing strategos are first mentioned in November 826, and the theme seems to have been established c. 820. The territory of the theme corresponds roughly to the late antique province of Paphlagonia, which had been subsumed in the themes of Opsikion and Boukellarion. Its administrative and ecclesiastical capital, as during Antiquity, was Gangra. Warren Treadgold – who notably believes that Paphlagonia belonged to the Armeniakon, and not the Boukellarion – suggested that its re-emergence as a separate province was linked with the new threat of Rus' naval activity in the Black Sea. According to the Arab geographers Ibn Khordadbeh and Ibn al-Faqih, the province numbered 5,000 troops and five fortified places. A notable exception to the usual thematic hierarchy is the existence of a katepano, in charge of a naval squadron, with his seat at Amastris.

After the Battle of Manzikert in 1071, most of the region was lost to the Seljuk Turks; the campaigns of John II Komnenos in the 1130s managed to recover firm control of the coast. The interior became disputed territory, John II took Kastamon and Gangra but the latter soon returned to Turkish hands. After the Fourth Crusade, Paphlagonia came under the control of David Komnenos, but in 1214 the Nicaean emperor Theodore I Laskaris seized the western parts up to Amastris. These remained in Byzantine hands until the late 14th century, when they were taken over by the Turks or the Genoese.

== Sources ==
- Kazhdan, Alexander, ed. (1991). The Oxford Dictionary of Byzantium. Oxford and New York: Oxford University Press. ISBN 0-19-504652-8.
- McGeer, Eric; Nesbitt, John; Oikonomides, Nicolas, eds. (2001). Catalogue of Byzantine Seals at Dumbarton Oaks and in the Fogg Museum of Art, Volume 4: The East. Vol. 4. Washington, DC: Dumbarton Oaks Research Library and Collection. ISBN 0-88402-282-X.
- Oikonomides, Nicolas (1972). Les listes de préséance byzantines des IXe et Xe siècles (in French). Paris: Editions du Centre National de la Recherche Scientifique.
- Pertusi, A. (1952). Constantino Porfirogenito: De Thematibus (in Italian). Rome: Biblioteca Apostolica Vaticana.
- Treadgold, Warren T. (1995). Byzantium and Its Army, 284–1081. Stanford, California: Stanford University Press. ISBN 0-8047-3163-2.
