= Siege of Perinthus =

Military investment of the city of Perinthus by Philip II of Macedon

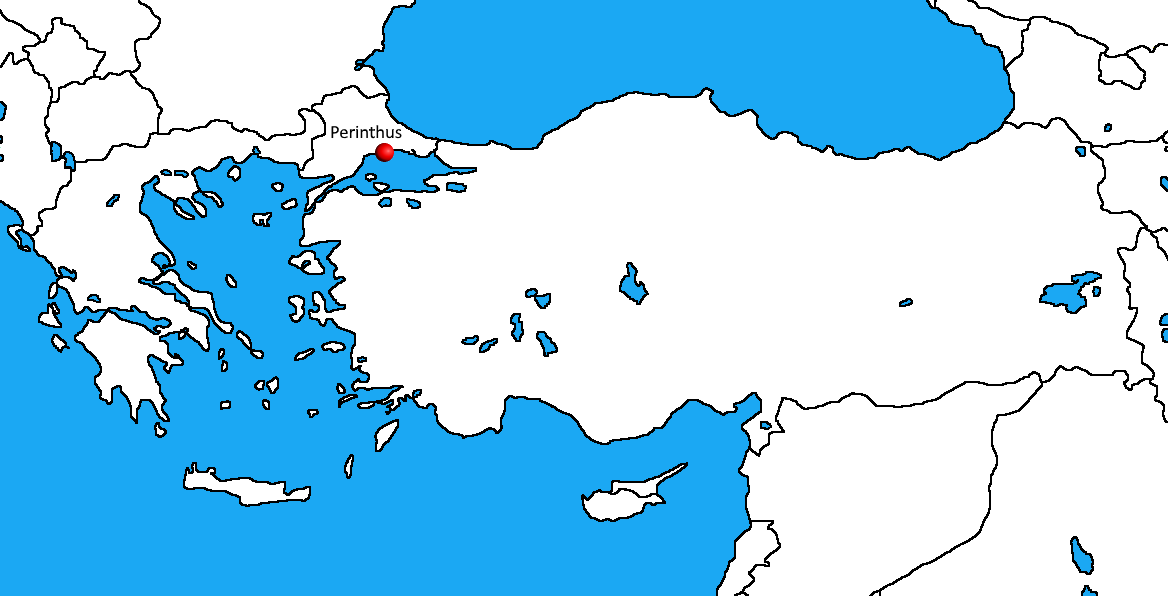
- Where the city of Perinthus was. The location of the city of Perinthus in Thrace.
Date	340–339 BC
Location	City of Perinthus, or Modern day Marmara Ereğlisi
Result	Macedonian defeat

Belligerents
Macedonia	Achaemenid Empire; Athens

Commanders and leaders
Philip II of Macedon	Artaxerxes III; Chares of Athens

The siege of Perinthus (340 BC) was an unsuccessful attempt by Philip II of Macedon to defeat the Athenian forces at Perinthus, and take the city. The siege was conducted alongside an unsuccessful siege of Byzantium. Both sieges took place in the period just before the Fourth Sacred War.

== Macedonia under Philip II ==
In 358 BC, Philip II of Macedon marched against the Illyrians, and defeated them at the Battle of Erigon Valley, killing about 7,000 Illyrians. Later that year, Macedonia and Athens came to an agreement, that Macedonia would give Athens Amphipolis and, in return, Athens would give Macedonia Pydna. Philip broke his promise by keeping both cities. This led to Athens declaring war on Macedonia. Many other campaigns were conducted against Athens.

In 356 BC, Philip conquered the town of Crenides and changed its name to Philippi.

In 349 BC, Philip started the siege of Olynthus. Olynthus was formerly allied with Macedonia but then had later switched their allegiance to Athens.

In 345 BC, Philip conducted another campaign against the Ardiaei, under their King Pleuratus I, during which Philip was seriously wounded in the lower right leg by an Ardian soldier.

In 342 BC, Philip led a great military expedition north against the Scythians, conquering the Thracian fortified settlement of Eumolpia which he renamed after himself, Philippopolis (modern-day Plovdiv).

== Siege of Perinthus ==
In 340 BC, Perinthos refused to participate in the Macedonian king Philip II’s military campaign against Athens in the Chersonese.Philip started his campaign to besiege Perinthus. The city stood on a peninsula, connected to the land by a 200 yard wide heavily fortified isthmus. The coast was protected by cliffs, making any naval attack nearly impossible.

The defenders of the cities were supported by Byzantium, as well as the Achaemenid Empire. The Athenian navy, under the control of Chares of Athens, kept the Macedonians out of the seas and helped maintain naval superiority. Reinforcements and supplies reached the city from its allies, and the Macedonian fleet was unable to stop the reinforcements from reaching the city.

After several weeks laying siege to the city, the Macedonians finally broke through the outer wall. But to their dismay, they reached a new wall inside the city that the defenders had built between the houses. This new wall was much more solid and stronger than the previous one. Philip's army was more numerous and had siege engines. However, since Perinthus was receiving constant aid from Byzantium and the Achaemenids, the siege was difficult to maintain. Eventually, Philip had found the challenges of successfully besieging the city too much, and so withdrew.

== Aftermath ==
After the failed siege of Perinthus, Philip focused most of his attention on Byzantium. In the late summer of 340 BC, he led half of his army to Byzantium, but the city refused to surrender to him and prepared to resist. Most of the Byzantian army was still at Perinthus, but the defenders who remained at Byzantium managed to survive the initial attack. The Byzantines received aid in the form of weaponry and men from their allies at Chios, Cos, and Rhodes. After several weeks of laying siege to Byzantium, Philip decided to launch one last surprise assault on the walls, using nothing but moonlight to aid the night attack. However, the barking of dogs was said to have betrayed the attack, and Philip decided once again, to give up and withdraw.

The summer of 338 BC, Philip successfully defeated Athens and Thebes at the Battle of Chaeronea (338 BC). After Philip's death, Philip's son, Alexander, later defeated the Achaemenids on several occasions and conquered the entirety of the Achaemenid Empire, greatly expanding the Macedonian Empire.
