= Barasbakourios =

Barasbakourios (Greek: Βαρισβακούριος; died 711) was a Byzantine dignitary in the service of Emperor Justinian II (r. 685–695, 705–711), whose downfall occasioned his own death at the hands of the agents of Emperor Philippicus (r. 711–713).

Barasbakourios was a resident of Chersonesus—and probably of Iberian descent, as suggested by his name—when he befriended the exiled emperor Justinian II around 695. Around 704, Barasbakourios accompanied Justinian to the Bulgars on a mission to rally support for his cause. In the closing years of Justinian's second reign (705–711), Barasbakourios was protopatrikios and komes of the Opsikion, a theme in northwestern Asia Minor and Justinian's major power-base. Barasbakourios's name appears on two seals, both dateable to the 8th century, as patrikios and komes of the "god-guarded imperial Opsikion", and—perhaps later—as patrikios, komes of the Opsikion and strategos of an unidentifiable theme.

When a rebel army under Philippicus took Constantinople and overthrew Justinian in 711, Barasbakourios fled, but was apprehended by Mauros and John, Philippicus's lieutenants, and put to death together with Justinian's other loyalists.
