= Agathonicus =

Saint Agathonicus
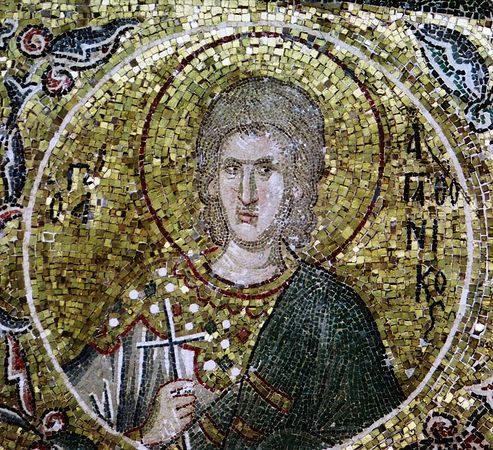
- Residence: Nicomedia, Roman Empire (modern-day İzmit, Turkey)
- Venerated in: Catholic Church; Eastern Orthodox Church
- Feast: August 21/22

Saint Agathonicus (Greek: Αγαθόνικος) was a 3rd-century citizen of Nicomedia. While living in Greece, he taught the Greeks about Christianity. Meanwhile, the imperial governor began persecuting Christians, following the orders of Emperor Maximian. In this persecution, Agathonicus' companion Zoticus was seized in Carpe, and his followers were crucified. He was sent to Nicomedia, where Agathonicus and his companions Princeps, Theoprepius, Acyndinus, Severian, Zeno, along with many others, were then taken to Byzantium. On this journey, many of the companions died from exhaustion and abuse, and the others were killed in Chalcedon. The survivors were taken to Thrace in Selymbria, where, after being tortured in front of the Greek Emperor, were beheaded.

Their feast day is August 21 in the Catholic and August 22 Eastern Orthodox Churches.
