= Garella =

Byzantine town and fortress

Coordinates: 41°04′N 26°34′E

Garella (Greek: Γάρελλα) was a Byzantine town and fortress, best known from its history as an episcopal see. Its site is occupied by the modern village of Altınyazı, in Edirne Province of Turkey.

== History ==
Historical references to the town are mostly connected to the local episcopal see. Thus the town first appears in the Second Council of Nicea in 787, where Bishop Sisinnius took part as a suffragan of the Metropolis of Adrianople. In summer 813, during his invasion of Thrace, the Bulgarian ruler Krum captured the town, and partially destroyed it. A boundary marker from the 8th/10th centuries with the inscription kastr[on] Gariala[s] is displayed in the museum at Pliska.

By the time of the Council of Constantinople of 869/870, the see had been raised to an archbishopric. Archbishop Hypatios participated in that council, and was followed by Archbishop Basil, who attended the Council of Constantinople of 879/880. The town and its see remained relatively unimportant and is rarely mentioned during the next few centuries. This is reflected by the relatively low place it held in the various Notitiae Episcopatuum, although it managed to rise from 21st place among 28 archbishoprics in the 10th century to 15th among 44 archbishoprics in the 13th century. Only the existence of lead seals attests to the existence of archbishops Leo (10th/11th century), Theodore (mid-11th century), and Niketas (3rd quarter of 11th century), while an unnamed archbishop of Garella took part in two synods in Constantinople in 1066 and 1067.

An imperial chrysobull, issued by Alexios I Komnenos in 1104, attests to the possession of the estate Barzachanion at Garella by the Great Lavra monastery; it was exchanged with imperial property near Thessalonica. Following the fall of Constantinople to the Fourth Crusade in 1204, the Partitio Romaniae mentions the pertinentia de Garelli as one of the domains to be apportioned among the common Crusaders. The Hospital of Sampson in Constantinople was granted estates at Garella by Pope Innocent III in 1210, a deed re-confirmed in 1244.

After the recapture of Constantinople by the Byzantines in 1261, the town and the bishopric are better known. In 1274, the unnamed Archbishop of Garella agreed to the Union of the Churches. In 1310, the Archbishop (again unnamed) participated in a synod in Constantinople against the selling of offices, and an Archbishop Paul is attested in a couple of synodal acts in July 1315. At the start the Byzantine civil war of 1321–1328, the town was occupied by the forces of Syrgiannes Palaiologos, who shortly after switched sides to support Andronikos III Palaiologos. A synodal act of September 1324 records the dues owed by the archbishopric to the Patriarchate of Constantinople as 24 hyperpyra.

Sometime around 1329/1331, the see of Garella was awarded jointly with that of Lopadion (in Bithynia, vacant due to the Ottoman conquest of the area). In June 1341, the archbishopric was raised to the status of a full metropolitan see. Metropolitan Ioannikios was appointed to the see in or shortly after May 1347, and remained in office until 1355/1356. He is the last known incumbent; as the area was devastated by Turkish raiders and the subsequent Ottoman conquest, the see was probably abolished soon after.

The village remained populated by Greeks until the Greco-Turkish population exchange in 1923. On the eve of the exchange, the village numbered 569 Greek inhabitants.

== Fortress ==
The castle of Garella was situated on an isolated hill to the east of the modern village. The ruins preserve remains of three towers (east, southeast, and west), as well as parts of the curtain wall. Based on the architectural characteristics, and the presence of large amounts of pottery shards from the middle Byzantine period, the castle is probably to be dated in the 12th century.

== Catholic titular see ==
Garella (Latin: Archidioecesis Garellensis) is listed as one of the titular sees of the Roman Catholic Church. Known incumbents are:

- Antonio Bonaventura Jeglič (May 17, 1930 – July 10, 1937)
- Eduardo Tonna (December 2, 1937 – April 15, 1939)
- Gabriel-Joseph-Elie Breynat (December 11, 1939 – March 10, 1954)
- Francisco Javier Nuño y Guerrero (18 December 1954 – March 25, 1972)

== Sources ==
- Darrouzès, Jean (1975). "Listes épiscopales du concile de Nicée (787)". Revue des études byzantines. 33: 5–76. doi:10.3406/rebyz.1975.2026.
- Külzer, Andreas (2008). Tabula Imperii Byzantini: Band 12, Ostthrakien (Eurōpē) (in German). Vienna: Österreichische Akademie der Wissenschaften. ISBN 978-3-7001-3945-4.
