= Edith Schönert-Geiß =

German numismatist (1933–2012)

Dr Edith Schönert-Geiß
- Born: 7 August 1933; Dresden, Germany
- Died: 12 June 2012 (aged 78); Berlin
- Occupation: Numismatist

Academic background
- Education: Humboldt University
- Thesis: Provinzialprägung der Stadt Perinthos (1960)

Edith Schönert-Geiß (7 August 1933, Dresden – 12 June 2012, Berlin) was a German numismatist, who specialised in the classical coinage of Thrace and was instrumental in the post-war re-establishment of the Corpus Nummorum.

== Biography ==
Edith Schönert was born on 7 August 1933 in Dresden. After she graduated from secondary school there, Schönert moved to Berlin to study History at Humboldt University. She began work on 1 September 1956, aged 23, at the Academy of Sciences of the GDR (Central Institute for Ancient History and Archaeology); her first project was on the mints of Greece - the study of which was to continue throughout her career. She became instrumental in the post-war continuation of the Corpus Nummorum, established by Theodor Mommsen.

In 1960, Schönert-Geiß was awarded a doctorate from Humboldt University for research on the provincial coinage of Perinthus. In addition to her research and publications on ancient Thrace, Schönert-Geiß studied Roman coins found in forts along the Danube. Her early work on the mint of Selymbria was reviewed as particularly useful, placing it in the context of its larger neighbouring mints.

Schönert-Geiß taught at both the Free University and at Humboldt University. At her retirement from the Academy of Sciences on 31 August 1998, she was honoured with a Festschrift which commemorated her meticulous scholarship. One of her last publications was a comprehensive bibliography of Thracian coinage, which was monumental in its scope, with 9350 references.

== Personal life ==
After her marriage, she took the name Geiß for personal matters, but published her academic work under the name Schönert-Geiß. In her spare time she enjoyed needlework and embroidery.

Schönert-Geiß died on the 12 June 2012. Her funeral was attended by colleagues and the taxi driver who she employed on a daily basis.

== Honours ==
For her services to research into Greek coinage, she was made an honorary member of the Romanian Numismatic Society in 1963 and an honorary member of the Numismatic Society of Stara Zagora in Bulgaria in 1987. The city of Stara Zagora granted her honorary citizenship for her services to numismatics. She was also an honorary member of the International Numismatic Council.

== Selected publications ==
- The Coinage of Perinthus (Berlin, 1965)
- The Coinage of Byzantion: Volumes 1 & 2 (Berlin/Amsterdam 1972)
- The Coinage of Bisanthe - Dikaia - Selymbria (Berlin, 1972)
- with Karl Matthiae: Münzen aus der urchristlichen Umwelt (Berlin, 1981)
- The Coinage of Maroneia (Berlin, 1987)
- Ancient coins. Collection HAS (= from the collections of the Winckelmann Society in Stendal. Volume 1). Stendal 1989.
- The Coinage of Augusta Traiana and Traianopolis (Berlin, 1991)
- Bibliography on Ancient Numismatics of Thrace and Moesia (Berlin, 1999)
