= Bucellarian Theme =

Theme of the Byzantine Empire

Theme of the Bucellarians Βουκελλάριον θέμα, θέμα Βουκελλαρίων
- Theme of the Byzantine Empire
- mid-8th century–1070s
- The Byzantine themes of Asia Minor in c. 780, after the split of the Opsikion.
- Capital: Ancyra; Claudiopolis
- Area
  - Coordinates: 40.79°N 32.72°E
- Historical era: Middle Ages
  - Established: 743–767
  - Fall to the Normans: 1073
- Today part of: Turkey

The Bucellarian Theme (Greek: Βουκελλάριον θέμα, Boukellarion thema), more properly known as the Theme of the Bucellarians (Greek: θέμα Βουκελλαρίων, thema Boukellariōn) was a Byzantine theme (a military-civilian province) in northern Asia Minor (modern Turkey). It was created around the middle of the 8th century, comprising the Bithynia region, the ancient region of Paphlagonia and parts of Galatia and Phrygia.

== History ==
The theme was established sometime after 743 and before 767 by the Emperor Constantine V (r. 741–775), following the suppression of the revolt of Artabasdos, the Count of the Opsikion. The new theme, along with that of the Optimatoi was split off from the Opsikion as formed part of the Emperor's policy to reduce the latter's power. The name of the theme derives from the late Roman Bucellarii, elite cavalry troops of Gothic or Roman origin, often found as privately recruited bodyguard troops. By the early 7th century, they formed an elite division in the Opsikion field force, coming under a domestikos before their elevation to a full theme. The strategos of the Bucellarians is attested for the first time in 767, providing a terminus ante quem for its creation. His headquarters were at Ancyra, the former capital of Opsikion, and he belonged to the second tier of strategoi with an annual salary of 30 pounds of gold. According to Arab geographers, he commanded some 8,000 troops. The court ranks of the Bucellarian strategoi ranged from the mid-level spatharios to the higher protospatharios, with a single occurrence of the more exalted patrikios in the 10th century. Claudiopolis is the only attested base of one of the theme's tourmai. Despite it being originally a cavalry theme (thema kaballarikon), the Bucellarians, as well as the later Paphlagonian theme, also included a small fleet, active in the Black Sea. The "katepano of the Bucellarians and the Paphlagonians", whose seal is attested in the 10th century, was the commander of this naval contingent. However, evidence points to the fact that the 10th-century fleet was composed of merchantmen and transport ships, not warships.

Initially, the theme stretched from the Black Sea coast to the central Anatolian plateau, bordering the Optimatoi and the rump of the Opsikion in the west, the Anatolic theme in the south, and the Armeniac theme in the east. In the 9th century, however, probably c. 820, the northeastern half of the theme was detached and formed, perhaps with some territory from the Armeniac theme, the new theme of Paphlagonia. Its extent was further reduced under Emperor Leo VI the Wise (r. 886–912), when eight southern and southeastern banda were removed to form part of the new themes of Cappadocia (around Lake Tatta) and Charsianon (east of the Halys River). In the 9th century, it comprised two towns and thirteen fortresses, while five towns are recorded in the 10th century. Following the Battle of Manzikert, the Norman rebel Roussel de Bailleul set up a splinter state in 1073. Ruling from Ancyra, he continued to expand in central Anatolia, until he was toppled by Alexios Komnenos and the land was ceded to the Seljuks in 1075. During the Komnenian restoration, the northern parts of the former theme were retaken but the theme itself wasn't reestablished. The name Boukellariōn, however, survived as a geographical designation in Byzantine sources up until 1263.

== Sources ==
- Gyftopoulou, Sofia; Velentzas, Georgios (May 24, 2005). "Theme of Boukellarion (Βουκελλαρίων Θέμα)". Encyclopedia of the Hellenic World, Asia Minor. Foundation of the Hellenic World.
- Kazhdan, Alexander, ed. (1991). The Oxford Dictionary of Byzantium. Oxford and New York: Oxford University Press. ISBN 0-19-504652-8.
- Lounghis, T. C. (1996). "The Decline of the Opsikian Domesticates and the Rise of the Domesticate of the Scholae". Byzantine Symmeikta. 10 (10): 27–36. doi:10.12681/byzsym.804. ISSN 1105-1639.
- Treadgold, Warren T. (1995). Byzantium and Its Army, 284–1081. Stanford, California: Stanford University Press. ISBN 0-8047-3163-2.
