= Paneion =

Paneion may refer to:

- temple of Pan (god)
- Banias, a location in the Golan Heights
- Paneion, a synonym of Poa, a genus of grass
- Serapeum, an ancient temple
- Mount Paneion, a hill range in Attica, Greece
