= Optimatoi =

Byzantine administrative unit (theme)

Theme of the Optimatoi Ὀπτιμάτοι, θέμα Ὀπτιμάτων
- Theme of the Byzantine Empire
- 740s–1204 1240–15th century
- Map of the administrative structure of the Byzantine Empire c. 780. The thema of the Optimatoi is located in the peninsula directly across the Bosporus, opposite Constantinople.
- Capital: Nicomedia (modern-day İzmit, Kocaeli, Turkey)
- Historical era: Middle Ages
  - Established: 744/745
  - Latin conquest: ca. 1204
  - Byzantine recovery: 1240
  - Conquest by Ottomans: 15th century

The Optimatoi (Greek: Ὀπτιμάτοι, from Latin: Optimates, "the Best Men") were initially formed as an elite Byzantine military unit. In the mid-8th century, however, they were downgraded to a supply and logistics corps and assigned a province (thema) in north-western Asia Minor, which was named after them. As an administrative unit, the Theme of the Optimatoi (θέμα Ὀπτιμάτων, thema Optimatōn) survived until the Ottoman conquest in the first decades of the 14th century.

== History ==
The Optimates were first set up in the late 6th century (c. 575), by Emperor Tiberius II Constantine (r. 574–582). According to the Strategikon of Emperor Maurice, the Optimates were an elite regiment of Foederati, most likely of Gothic origin. They were a cavalry corps, somewhere between one and five thousand strong, and formed part of the central reserve army, their commander bearing the then unique title of taxiarchēs. The presence of descendants of these men, called Gothograeci (Γοτθογραίκοι) by the chronicler Theophanes the Confessor, is attested in northern Bithynia as late as the early 8th century. At that time, Warren Treadgold estimates that the corps numbered 2,000 men, a figure that possibly corresponds to its original size as well.

In the mid-8th century, under the rule of Emperor Constantine V (r. 741–775), and as part of his measures to reduce the power of the thematic generals following the revolt of Artabasdos, the Count of the Opsician Theme, the corps was downgraded. Split off from the Opsician Theme, the region where the Optimates had settled, including the peninsula opposite Constantinople, both shores of the Gulf of Nicomedia and stretching to the shores of the river Sangarius, was then constituted as the separate thema of the Optimatoi (θέμα Ὀπτιμάτων) with Nicomedia as its capital. The first mention of the Optimatoi as a separate thema in the sources occurs only in 774/5, but it is clear that its creation must have come in the years after the suppression of Artabasdos's revolt. The same period also saw the further dismemberment and weakening of the once powerful Opsician Theme with the creation of the Bucellarian Theme.

Henceforth, unlike the other themata, the Optimatoi no longer provided armed troops, but formed a corps of 4,000 mule-drivers with their animals, which provided the baggage train (touldon) of the imperial tagmata in Constantinople. The unique role of the Optimatoi set it apart from all other themata: given their non-combatant functions, the Optimatoi were not divided into intermediate-level commands (tourmai or droungoi), a fact pointed out by Emperor Constantine VII Porphyrogennetos (r. 913–959) as a sign of inferior status. Consequently, their commanding domestikos held the lowest rank of all provincial stratēgoi in the imperial hierarchy. As with the other themata, for the administration of his duties as governor of the province, the domestikos was assisted by a deputy (topotērētēs), a chief financial official (chartoularios) and a secretariat headed by a prōtokankellarios.

The rural districts of the thema were raided by Seljuk Turks after the Battle of Manzikert, but Nicomedia was retained, and the area secured again under Emperor Alexios I Komnenos (r. 1081–1118) with the help of the First Crusade. The area was occupied by the Latins after the dissolution of the Empire by the Fourth Crusade in 1204, but the thema was re-established by John III Vatatzes when he retook the region in 1240, and survived until the area was gradually conquered by the rising Ottoman beylik in the first half of the 14th century.

== Sources ==
- Haldon, John F. (1984). Byzantine Praetorians: An Αdministrative, Ιnstitutional and Social Survey of the Opsikion and the Tagmata, c. 580-900. Vol. 3. Bonn: R. Habelt. ISBN 3-7749-2004-4.
- Haldon, John F. (1999). Warfare, State and Society in the Byzantine World, 565-1204. London: University College London Press (Taylor & Francis Group). ISBN 1-85728-495-X.
- Kazhdan, Alexander, ed. (1991). The Oxford Dictionary of Byzantium. Oxford and New York: Oxford University Press. ISBN 0-19-504652-8.
- Lounghis, T. C. (1996). "The Decline of the Opsikian Domesticates and the Rise of the Domesticate of the Scholae". Byzantine Symmeikta. 10 (10): 27–36. doi:10.12681/byzsym.804. ISSN 1105-1639.
- Turtledove, Harry, ed. (1982). The Chronicle of Theophanes: Anni mundi 6095-6305 (A.D. 602-813). Philadelphia, Pennsylvania: University of Pennsylvania Press. ISBN 978-0-8122-1128-3.
- Treadgold, Warren T. (1995). Byzantium and Its Army, 284–1081. Stanford, California: Stanford University Press. ISBN 0-8047-3163-2.
