= Opsikion =

Province of the Byzantine Empire

Theme of Opsikion Ὀψίκιον, θέμα Ὀψικίου
- Theme of the Byzantine Empire
- 640s/660s–1230s
- The Asian themes of the Byzantine Empire in c. 780
- Capital: Ancyra, then Nicaea
- Historical era: Middle Ages
  - Established: 640s/660s
  - Fall to the Latins: 1234
- Today part of: Turkey

The Opsician Theme (Greek: θέμα Ὀψικίου, thema Opsikiou) or simply Opsikion (Greek: [θέμα] Ὀψίκιον, from Latin: Obsequium) was a Byzantine theme (a military-civilian province) located in northwestern Asia Minor (modern Turkey). Created from the imperial retinue army, the Opsikion was the largest and most prestigious of the early themes, being located closest to Constantinople. Involved in several revolts in the 8th century, it was split in three after c. 750, and lost its former pre-eminence. It survived as a middle-tier theme until after the Fourth Crusade.

== History ==
The Opsician theme was one of the first four themes, and has its origin in the praesental armies of the East Roman army. (Note: The praesental armies were the forces commanded by the two magistri militum praesentalis, the "masters of the soldiers in the presence [of the emperor]". They were stationed around Constantinople in Thrace and Bithynia, and formed the core of the various imperial expeditions in the 6th and early 7th centuries.) The term Opsikion derives from the Latin term Obsequium ("retinue"), which by the early 7th century came to refer to the units escorting the emperor on campaign. It is possible that at an early stage, the Opsikion was garrisoned inside Constantinople itself. In the 640s, however, following the disastrous defeats suffered during the first wave of the Muslim conquests, the remains of the field armies were withdrawn to Asia Minor and settled into large districts, called "themes" (themata). Thus the Opsician theme was the area where the imperial Opsikion was settled, which encompassed all of north-western Asia Minor (Mysia, Bithynia, parts of Galatia, Lydia and Paphlagonia) from the Dardanelles to the Halys River, with Ancyra as its capital. The exact date of the theme's establishment is unknown; the earliest reference points to a creation as early as 626, but the first confirmed occurrence is in 680. It is possible that it also initially included the area of Thrace, which seems to have been administered jointly with the Opsikion in the late 7th and early 8th centuries.

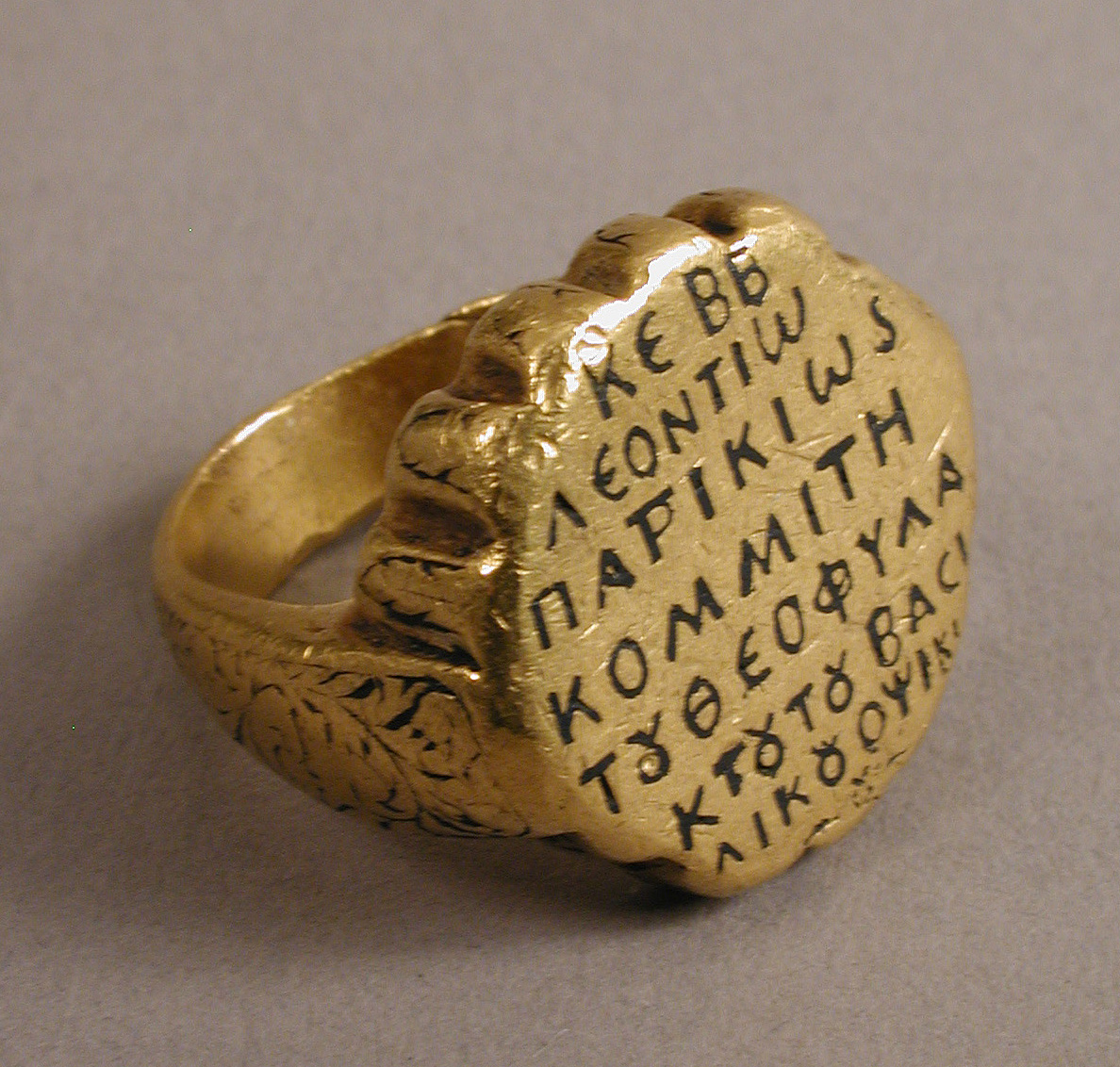
Signet ring of Leontios, patrikios and Count of the God-guarded imperial Opsikion

The unique origin of the Opsikion was reflected in several aspects of the theme's organization. Thus the title of its commander was not stratēgos (στρατηγός, "general") as with the other themes, but komēs (κόμης, "count"), in full komēs tou basilikou Opsikiou (κόμης τοῦ βασιλικοῦ Ὀψικίου, "Count of the imperial Opsikion"). Furthermore, it was not divided into tourmai, but into domesticates formed from the elite corps of the old army, such as the Optimatoi and Boukellarioi, both terms dating back to the recruitment of Gothic foederati in the 4th–6th centuries. Its prestige is further illustrated by the seals of its commanders, where it is called the "God-guarded imperial Opsikion" (θεοφύλακτον βασιλικόν ὀψίκιον; Latin: a Deo conservandum imperiale Obsequium).

Since the counts of the Opsikion were in command of a pre-eminent theme, and since that theme was located closest to the imperial capital Constantinople, these counts often challenged the authority of their emperors. Already in 668, on the death of Emperor Constans II in Sicily, the count Mezezius had staged an abortive coup. Under the patrikios Barasbakourios, the Opsikion was the main power-base of Emperor Justinian II (r. 685–695 and 705–711). Having captured many Slavs in Thrace, Justinian II settled them in the Opsikion to boost its military strength (see Asia Minor Slavs). However, most of these transplanted soldiers deserted to the Arabs during their first battle. In 713, the Opsikian army rose up against Philippikos Bardanes (r. 711–713), the man who had overthrown and murdered Justinian, and enthroned Anastasios II (r. 713–715), only to overthrow him too in 715 and install Theodosios III (r. 715–717) in his place. In 717, the Opsicians supported the rise of Leo III the Isaurian (r. 717–740) to the throne, but in 718, their count, the patrikios Isoes, rose up unsuccessfully against him. In 741–742, the kouropalatēs Artabasdos used the theme as a base for his brief usurpation of Emperor Constantine V (r. 741–775). In 766, another count was blinded after a failed mutiny against the same emperor. The revolts of the Opsician theme against the Isaurian emperors were not only the result of its counts' ambition: the Opsicians were staunchly iconodule, and opposed to the iconoclast policies of the Isaurian dynasty. As a result, Emperor Constantine V set out to weaken the theme's power by splitting off the new themes of the Boukellarioi and the Optimatoi. At the same time, the emperor recruited a new set of elite and staunchly iconoclast guard regiments, the tagmata.

Consequently, the reduced Opsikion was downgraded from a guard formation to an ordinary cavalry theme: its forces were divided into tourmai, and its count fell to the sixth place in the hierarchy of thematic governors and was even renamed to the "ordinary" title of stratēgos by the end of the 9th century. In the 9th century, he is recorded as receiving an annual salary of 30 pounds of gold, and of commanding 6,000 men (down from an estimated 18,000 of the old Opsikion). The thematic capital was moved to Nicaea. The 10th-century emperor Constantine Porphyrogennetos, in his De Thematibus, mentions further nine cities in the theme: Cotyaeum, Dorylaeum, Midaion, Apamea Myrlea, Lampsacus, Parion, Cyzicus and Abydus.

In the great revolt of Thomas the Slav in the early 820s, the Opsikion remained loyal to Emperor Michael II (r. 820–829). In 866, the Opsician stratēgos, George Peganes, rose up along with the Thracesian Theme against Basil I the Macedonian (r. 867–886), then the junior co-emperor of Michael III (r. 842–867), and in c. 930, Basil Chalkocheir revolted against Emperor Romanos I Lekapenos (r. 920–944). Both revolts, however, were easily quelled, and are a far cry from the emperor-making revolts of the 8th century. The theme existed through the Komnenian period, and was united with the Aegean theme sometime in the 12th century. It apparently also survived after the Fourth Crusade into the Empire of Nicaea. George Akropolites records that in 1234, the Opsician theme fell under the "Italians" (Latin Empire).

== Military governors ==
- Barasbakourios, komes of Opsikion (700s)
- Isoes, komes of Opsikion (718)
- Artabasdos, komes of Opsikion (741)
- George Peganes, strategos of Opsikion (866)
- Manuel Boutoumites, doux of Nicaea (1097)
- Eustathios Kamytzes, doux of Nicaea (1113)

== Sources ==
- Ahrweiler, Hélène (1966). Byzance et la mer: La marine de guerre, la politique et les institutions maritimes de Byzance aux VIIe–XVe siècles (in French). Paris: Presses universitaires de France.
- Haldon, John F. (1984). Byzantine Praetorians: An Αdministrative, Ιnstitutional and Social Survey of the Opsikion and the Tagmata, c. 580-900. Vol. 3. Bonn, Germany: R. Habelt. ISBN 3-7749-2004-4.
- Haldon, John F. (1997). Byzantium in the Seventh Century: The Transformation of a Culture. Cambridge: Cambridge University Press. ISBN 978-0-521-31917-1.
- Haldon, John (1999). Warfare, State and Society in the Byzantine World, 565–1204. London: UCL Press. ISBN 1-85728-495-X.
- Kazhdan, Alexander, ed. (1991). The Oxford Dictionary of Byzantium. Oxford and New York: Oxford University Press. ISBN 0-19-504652-8.
- Lampakis, Stylianos; Andriopoulou, Vera (October 17, 2003). "Theme of Opsikion (Οψικίου Θέμα)". Encyclopedia of the Hellenic World: Asia Minor (in Greek). Athens, Greece: Foundation of the Hellenic World.
- Lounghis, T. C. (1996). "The Decline of the Opsikian Domesticates and the Rise of the Domesticate of the Scholae". Byzantine Symmeikta. 10 (10): 27–36. doi:10.12681/byzsym.804. ISSN 1105-1639. S2CID 161402524.
- Treadgold, Warren T. (1995). Byzantium and Its Army, 284–1081. Stanford, California: Stanford University Press. ISBN 0-8047-3163-2.
