= Selymbria =

Town of ancient Thrace

Coordinates: 41°04′49″N 28°16′06″E

Selymbria (Greek: Σηλυμβρία), or Selybria (Σηλυβρία), or Selybrie (Σηλυβρίη), was a town of ancient Thrace on the Propontis, 22 Roman miles east from Perinthus, and 44 Roman miles west from Constantinople, near the southern end of the wall built by Anastasius I Dicorus for the protection of his capital. Its site is located at Silivri in European Turkey.

== History ==
According to Strabo, its name signifies "the town of Selys;" from which it has been inferred that Selys was the name of its founder, or of the leader of the colony from Megara, which founded it at an earlier period than the establishment of Byzantium, another colony of the same Greek city-state. In honour of Eudoxia, the wife of the emperor Arcadius, its name was changed to Eudoxiopolis or Eudoxioupolis (Εὐδοξιούπολις), which it bore for a considerable time. It was still its official name in the seventh century, but the modern name shows that it subsequently resumed its original designation.

Respecting the history of Selymbria, only detached and fragmentary notices occur in the Greek writers. In Latin authors, it is merely named; although Pliny the Elder reports that it was said to have been the birthplace of Prodicus, a disciple of Hippocrates. It was here that Xenophon met Medosades, the envoy of Seuthes II, whose forces afterwards encamped in its neighbourhood. When Alcibiades was commanding for the Athenians in the Propontis (410 BC), the people of Selymbria refused to admit his army into the town, but gave him money, probably in order to induce him to abstain from forcing an entrance. Some time after this, however, he gained possession of the place through the treachery of some of the townspeople, and, having levied a contribution upon its inhabitants, left a garrison in it. Selymbria is mentioned by Demosthenes in 351 BC, as in alliance with the Athenians; and it was no doubt at that time a member of the Byzantine confederacy. According to a letter of Philip II of Macedon, quoted in the oration de Corona, it was blockaded by him about 343 BC; but others consider that this mention of Selymbria is one of the numerous proofs that the documents inserted in that speech are not authentic.

Polyidos (Πολύιδος) of Selymbria won with a dithyramb a contest at Athens.

Athenaeus in the Deipnosophistae wrote that Cleisophus (Κλείσοφος) of Selymbria fell in love with a statue of Parian marble while he was at Samos.

Works of Favorinus includes the "Letters of Selymbrians" (Σηλυμβρίων ἐπιστολαί).

Selymbria had a small, but significant mint, researched by Edith Schönert-Geiß.

== Ecclesiastical history ==
In Christian times, Selymbria was the seat of a bishop. In the tenth century, it became an autocephalous archbishopric and under Marcus Comnenus a metropolis without suffragan sees. The oldest known bishop is Theophilus, transferred from Apamea. Other known bishops include:

- Romanus (fl. 448–451)
- Sergius (fl. 680)
- George (fl. 692)
- Epiphanius, author of a lost work against the Iconoclasts
- Simeon, assisted in 879 at the Fourth Council of Constantinople
- John (fl. 1151–1156), bishop during the controversy over Soterichos Panteugenos

Under the Emperor Michael VIII Palaiologos, the metropolitan of Selymbria, whose name is unknown, was one of the prelates who signed a letter to the pope on the union of the churches. In 1347, Methodius was one of the signatories at the Fifth Council of Constantinople which deposed the patriarch John XIV, the adversary of the Palamites. In 1356 Selymbria assumed the administration of the metropolis of Nicomedia, due to the latter's decline after its fall to the Ottomans. Philotheus, who lived about 1365, was the author of the panegyric on Saint Agathonicus, a martyr who suffered at Selymbria under Maximian, and of the panegyric on Saint Macarius, a monk of Constantinople towards the end of the thirteenth century. John Chortasmenos, who took the name Ignatius, served from 1431 to 1439.

No longer a residential see, it remains a titular see of the Roman Catholic Church.

== Autonomous rulers ==
The list of the autonomous rulers of Selymbria in the Byzantine Empire under the Palaiologos dynasty:

- Andronikos IV Palaiologos (1381–1385), as emperor
- John VII Palaiologos (1385–1403), as emperor
- Theodore II Palaiologos (1443–1448), as despot
