= Perinthus =

Ancient Greek city in Marmara Ereğlisi, Turkey

- Πέρινθος (Ancient Greek)
- Heraclea (Ἡράκλεια)
- Location within Marmara Location within Turkey Location within Balkans
- 40°58′17″N 27°57′11″E
- Type: Settlement
- Location: Marmara Ereğlisi, Tekirdağ, Turkey

History
- Built: 602 BC

Site notes
- Condition: Ruined
- Public access: Yes

Perinthus (Ancient Greek: Πέρινθος, romanized: Périnthos), also known as Heraclea (Ἡράκλεια, Hērákleia), was an ancient city located in what is now Marmara Ereğlisi, Turkey. It was a great and flourishing town of ancient Thrace, situated on the Propontis. According to John Tzetzes, it bore at an early period the name of Mygdonia (Μυγδονία). It lay 35 kilometres (22 mi) west of Selymbria and 90 kilometres (56 mi) west of Byzantium, on a small peninsula of the bay which bears its name, and was built like an amphitheatre, on the declivity of a hill. Its site is near modern Marmara Ereğlisi, in Turkey.

== History ==
Perinthus was founded by colonists from the island of Samos in 602 BC. It was particularly renowned for its obstinate defence against Philip II of Macedon. At that time it appears to have been a more important and flourishing town even than Byzantium and being both a harbour and a point at which several main roads met, it was the seat of extensive commerce. This circumstance explains the reason why so many of its coins are still extant from which we learn that large and celebrated festivals were held here. Perinthus was renamed to Heraclea in 286 AD during the reign of the Roman emperor Diocletian. It was sometimes called Heraclea Thraciae and Heraclea Perinthus.

Septimius Severus (r. 193–211) twice granted the city the prestigious title of neokoros and gave it permission to hold crown festivals in his honor, in recognition of its support during his conflict with Pescennius Niger, a rival claimant to the Roman throne.

Justinian restored the old imperial palace, and the aqueducts of the city. Coins of Perinthus have also survived, which were studied by Edith Schönert-Geiß. The inscriptions from Perinthus and the literary testimonia on the city have been collected by Mustafa Hamdi Sayar.

== Cityscape ==
The peninsula and acropolis were complemented by the landward lower city and its walls, some remains of which have been found.

Other notable places include the 5th-century basilica which in its architecture seems to be closely linked to the church designs of Constantinople. The floor mosaics are particularly well made and preserved.

Stone from the basilica seems to have been used in the construction of a tower meant to guard a 1.9m wide secondary gate, from which may be deduced that the basilica must have been destroyed some time prior, though the date for that is not certain. Archaeologists and historians from the Tekirdağ Museum, the University of Istanbul and the University of Heidelberg think the church might have stood for no more than perhaps 150 years. It was never rebuilt and instead replaced with a small chapel.

== See also ==
- List of ancient Greek cities
