= Episkepsis =

An episkepsis (Greek: ἐπίσκεψις lit. 'inspection', pl. episkepseis, ἐπισκέψεις) was a fiscal district in the middle Byzantine Empire (10th–13th centuries). In its strict technical sense, it refers to a domain or other property, in some cases including entire villages or towns, allocated for the support of individuals of the imperial family (basilike episkepsis), noble houses or churches and monasteries. As the historian Paul Magdalino shows, these episkepseis were overwhelmingly situated in the coastlands around the Aegean Sea, which comprised the Empire's best arable land, or in fertile inland areas such as Thrace and Thessaly. In the 12th century, the term refers also to the fiscal divisions of the themes.

As an institution, the episkepsis existed as early as the ninth century, with regards citing episketites - the position overseeing such territory - as a function of the oikeiakon, a sekreton created by Basil II. It is noted that an episkepsis is designated as an imperial holding throughout its existence in the Byzantine history. These holdings or estates were classified into three: imperial, personal, and ecclesiastical. Some of the examples of these territories include Macedonia, Miletos, and Alopekai. An episkepsis may be transformed into a kouratoria in the event of stability and expanded revenue. For instance, Seleukia was an episkepsis during the tenth century but later constituted the grand kouratoria of Tarsos.

== Sources ==
- Kazhdan, Alexander, ed. (1991). The Oxford Dictionary of Byzantium. Oxford and New York: Oxford University Press. p. 717. ISBN 0-19-504652-8.
- Magdalino, Paul (2002). The Empire of Manuel I Komnenos, 1143–1180. Cambridge University Press. pp. 164–168, 234–235. ISBN 0-521-52653-1.
